= 2007–08 PFC CSKA Sofia season =

CSKA Sofia
2007–08 season
- Chairman: Aleksandar Tomov
- Manager: Stoycho Mladenov
- A Group: Champions
- Bulgarian Cup: Second Round
- UEFA Cup: First Round
- Top goalscorer: League: Nei (14); All: Nei (17)
Home colours	Away colours

The 2007–08 season was PFC CSKA Sofia's 60th consecutive season in A Group. This article shows player statistics and all matches (official and friendly) that the club have and will play during the 2007–08 season.

== Players ==
=== Squad information ===
Appearances for competitive matches only

No.	Pos	Nat	Player	Total		A Group		Bulgarian Cup		UEFA Cup	
No.	Pos	Nat	Player	Apps	Goals	Apps	Goals	Apps	Goals	Apps	Goals
2	DF	(Serbia) SRB	Nenad Nastić	7	0	4+3	0	0	0	0	0
3	DF	(Bulgaria) BUL	Aleksandar Tunchev	30	3	26	3	1	0	3	0
5	MF	(Bulgaria) BUL	Todor Yanchev	33	2	26+2	2	1	0	4	0
6	DF	(Bulgaria) BUL	Kiril Kotev	18	0	16+2	0	0	0	0	0
7	FW	(Bulgaria) BUL	Ivaylo Dimitrov	1	0	0+1	0	0	0	0	0
8	MF	(Bulgaria) BUL	Velizar Dimitrov	29	4	21+3	4	1	0	4	0
9	FW	(Panama) PAN	José Garcés	19	3	5+9	3	0+1	0	0+4	0
10	MF	(Bulgaria) BUL	Georgi Iliev	17	1	8+8	1	0	0	0+1	0
11	MF	(Bulgaria) BUL	Emil Gargorov	13	0	11+2	0	0	0	0	0
12	GK	(Bulgaria) BUL	Ivaylo Petrov	33	0	28	0	1	0	4	0
13	MF	(Montenegro) MNE	Nikola Vujadinović	22	1	16+1	1	1	0	4	0
15	DF	(North Macedonia) MKD	Robert Petrov	0	0	0	0	0	0	0	0
17	MF	(Portugal) POR	Zé Rui	13	1	7+6	1	0	0	0	0
18	MF	(Romania) ROU	Florentin Petre	27	11	24	11	1	0	2	0
19	FW	(Bulgaria) BUL	Evgeni Yordanov	7	1	3+4	1	0	0	0	0
20	FW	(Bulgaria) BUL	Yordan Yurukov	7	1	3+4	1	0	0	0	0
21	MF	(Nigeria) NGR	Shikoze Udoji	27	1	17+6	1	0	0	2+2	0
22	GK	(Bulgaria) BUL	Ilko Pirgov	2	0	2	0	0	0	0	0
24	MF	(Bulgaria) BUL	Aleksandar Tonev	2	0	0+2	0	0	0	0	0
25	GK	(Cameroon) CMR	Daniel Bekono	0	0	0	0	0	0	0	0
27	DF	(Netherlands) NED	Quido Lanzaat	14	0	7+3	0	0	0	3+1	0
28	MF	(Brazil) BRA	Marquinhos	27	1	19+5	1	1	0	2	0
30	MF	(Bulgaria) BUL	Yordan Todorov	31	1	24+2	1	1	0	4	0
84	DF	(Brazil) BRA	Filipe Machado	15	2	13+2	2	0	0	0	0
99	FW	(Brazil) BRA	Nei	33	17	23+5	14	1	0	4	3
Players sold or loaned out after the start of the season:
11	FW	(Nigeria) NGR	Kevin Amuneke	14	2	5+5	2	0+1	0	2+1	0
14	DF	(Bulgaria) BUL	Valentin Iliev	18	1	14	1	1	0	3	0
19	FW	(Bulgaria) BUL	Georgi Chilikov	14	4	4+8	3	0+1	0	0+1	1
23	MF	(Morocco) MAR	Abderrahman Kabous	13	0	5+3	0	1	0	3+1	0

As of game played start of season

== Players in/out ==
=== Summer transfers ===
In: Note: Flags indicate national team as defined under FIFA eligibility rules; some limited exceptions apply. Players may hold more than one non-FIFA nationality.

No.	Pos.	Nation	Player
5	MF	BUL	Todor Yanchev (free from Randers)
9	FW	PAN	José Garcés (from Club Nacional)
11	FW	NGR	Kevin Amuneke (from Vitória Setúbal)
13	DF	MNE	Nikola Vujadinović (free from Radnički Pirot)
17	MF	POR	Zé Rui (from Nacional Madeira)
19	FW	BUL	Georgi Chilikov (on loan from Nacional Madeira)
27	DF	NED	Quido Lanzaat (free from Duisburg)
28	MF	BRA	Marquinhos (from Belasitsa Petrich)
84	DF	BRA	Filipe Machado (on loan from União Leiria)
99	FW	BRA	Nei (from Naval)

Out: Note: Flags indicate national team as defined under FIFA eligibility rules; some limited exceptions apply. Players may hold more than one non-FIFA nationality.

No.	Pos.	Nation	Player
1	GK	SRB	Oliver Kovačević (to AEL Limassol)
4	MF	BRA	Daniel Morales (to Lokomotiv Plovdiv)
7	FW	BUL	Stoyko Sakaliev (on loan to Lokomotiv Plovdiv)
11	FW	CIV	Guillaume Dah Zadi (on loan to Changchun Yatai)
16	DF	BUL	Aleksandar Branekov (on loan to Lokomotiv Plovdiv)
17	FW	BUL	Evgeni Yordanov (to Marek Dupnitsa)
19	FW	ROU	Eugen Trică (to CFR Cluj)
24	MF	BUL	Mihail Aleksandrov (to Borussia Dortmund II)
25	DF	BUL	Ivan Ivanov (on loan to Lokomotiv Plovdiv)
26	MF	BUL	Nikolay Chipev (on loan to Beroe Stara Zagora)
27	DF	BRA	Tiago Silva (to Genk)
28	FW	ROU	Alexandru Piţurcă (to Pandurii Târgu Jiu)
77	FW	POR	José Furtado (to Paços de Ferreira)
—	GK	BUL	Ivan Karadzhov (on loan to Rilski sportist Samokov)

=== Winter transfers ===
In: Note: Flags indicate national team as defined under FIFA eligibility rules; some limited exceptions apply. Players may hold more than one non-FIFA nationality.

No.	Pos.	Nation	Player
2	DF	SRB	Nenad Nastić (free from Vojvodina Novi Sad)
11	MF	BUL	Emil Gargorov (on loan to RC Strasbourg)
19	FW	BUL	Evgeni Yordanov (from Marek Dupnitsa)
25	GK	CMR	Daniel Bekono (free from Beroe Stara Zagora)
84	DF	BRA	Filipe Machado (from União Leiria)

Out: Note: Flags indicate national team as defined under FIFA eligibility rules; some limited exceptions apply. Players may hold more than one non-FIFA nationality.

No.	Pos.	Nation	Player
2	DF	BUL	Pavel Vidanov (on loan to Vihren Sandanski)
11	FW	NGR	Kevin Amuneke (to Norrköping)
14	DF	BUL	Valentin Iliev (to Terek Grozny)
19	FW	BUL	Georgi Chilikov (to Dalian Shide)
23	MF	MAR	Abderrahman Kabous (to Real Murcia)
35	DF	BUL	Krum Lovkov (on loan to Vihren Sandanski, previously on loan at Rilski sportist Samokov)
—	MF	BUL	Stoyan Abrashev (on loan to Spartak Varna)
—	FW	BUL	Stanko Yovchev (on loan to Rilski sportist Samokov)
—	FW	BUL	Yulian Kurtelov (on loan to Bansko)
—	FW	CIV	Guillaume Dah Zadi (to Changchun Yatai)

== Pre-season and friendlies ==
Win Draw Loss Fixtures

=== Pre-season ===
11 July 2007 Friendly	Rislki Sportist	2–6	CSKA	Samokov
11:00 EET	Boychev 16'; Marinov 33'; Kouame Fidel (yellow card) 39'; Mamadou Koutara (yellow card) 43'	(Report)	Chilikov 2'; Todorov 8', 13'; Sakaliev 48'; Zé Rui 49'; V. Iliev 64'; Sakaliev (yellow card) 86'	Stadium: Iskar; Attendance: 500; Referee: Petar Tonchev

14 July 2007 Friendly	CSKA	3–1	Minyor Pernik	Pancharevo
11:00 EET	Garcés 25'; V. Iliev 55'; Sakaliev 84' (pen.)	(Report)	P. Petrov 6'; Spahiev (yellow card) 33'	Stadium: CSKA Training Stadium; Attendance: 2,000; Referee: Angel Angelov

18 July 2007 Friendly	Cambuur (Netherlands)	0–1	(Bulgaria) CSKA	Oosterbeek, Netherlands
19:00 EET		(Report)	Chilikov 32'	Attendance: 150

20 July 2007 Friendly	Hapoel Kfar Saba (Israel)	0–4	(Bulgaria) CSKA	Oosterbeek, Netherlands
19:00 EET	Yadin (red card) 12'; Shen (red card) 21'	(Report)	Marquinhos 35'; Chilikov 70', 89', 90'	Attendance: 30

24 July 2007 Friendly	Konyaspor (Turkey)	0–2	(Bulgaria) CSKA	Elten, Germany
19:00 EET	Özsaraç (yellow card) 20'	(Report)	Marquinhos 8', 56'	Attendance: 30

28 July 2007 Friendly	CSKA (Bulgaria)	1–1	(Turkey) Bursaspor	Oosterbeek, Netherlands
19:00 EET	Amuneke 41'	(Report)	Pancu 26' (pen.); Bekiroğlu (yellow card) 14'

2 August 2007 PlayStation Cup; Semi-final	CSKA (Bulgaria)	1–0	(Serbia) Borac Čačak	Sofia
20:30 EET	Dimitrov 58'; Yanchev (yellow card) 39'	(Report)	Simić (yellow card) 82'	Stadium: Balgarska Armiya; Attendance: 6,000; Referee: Anton Genov

4 August 2007 PlayStation Cup; Final	CSKA (Bulgaria)	4–1	(Greece) Apollon Kalamarias	Sofia
20:15 EET	V. Iliev 32'; Nei 37'; Udoji 56'; Zé Rui 58'; Kabous (yellow card) 89'	(Report)	Brito 44'; Bushi (yellow card) 10'; Sarakatsanos (yellow card) 35'	Stadium: Balgarska Armiya; Attendance: 2,000; Referee: Valeri Petrovski

=== On-season (autumn) ===
22 August 2007 Friendly	CSKA	3–0	Rilski Sportist Samokov	Pancharevo
18:00 EET	Nei 2'; Garcés 66', 79'	(Report)	Kouame Fidel (yellow card) 26'	Stadium: CSKA Training Stadium

8 September 2007 Friendly	Skoda Xanthi (Greece)	0–0	(Bulgaria) CSKA	Xanthi, Greece
19:00 EET	Quintana (yellow card)	(Report)	Marquinhos (yellow card) 61'; Kabous (yellow card) 66'	Stadium: Skoda Xanthi Arena

14 October 2007 Friendly	Vardar Skopje (North Macedonia)	1–2	(Bulgaria) CSKA	Skopje, Macedonia
15:00 EET	Emurlaj 63' (pen.); Perendiha (yellow card) 30'; Fotev (yellow card) 28' (yellow-red card) 42'; Emurlaj (yellow card) 45+1'	(Report)	Petre 38'; G. Iliev 41'; Uzunov (yellow card) 45+3'; Nei (yellow card) 45+4'	Stadium: Philip II Arena; Attendance: 200; Referee: Vlatko Kiriakovski

23 October 2007 Friendly	CSKA	5–1	Rilski Sportist Samokov	Pancharevo
16:00 EET	Udoji 27'; Amuneke 44'; Chilikov 45'; I.Dimitrov 69'; Petre 80'; Zé Rui (yellow card); Vidanov (yellow card); Vujadinović (red card) 73'	(Report)	Kouame Fidel 21'	Stadium: CSKA Training Stadium; Attendance: 100

17 November 2007 Friendly	Veria (Greece)	2–2	(Bulgaria) CSKA	Veria, Greece
17:00 EET	Bukovski 47'; Julinho 52'	(Report)	G. Iliev 20' (pen.); Chilikov 78'	Stadium: Veria

12 December 2007 Friendly	Svetkavitsa Targovishte	1–0	CSKA	Targovishte
14:00 EET	Velikov 59'	(Report)		Stadium: Dimitar Burkov; Attendance: 1,500; Referee: Sevdim Adem

=== Mid-season ===
26 January 2008 Friendly	CSKA (Bulgaria)	2–0	(Poland) Wisła Kraków	Pego, Spain
17:00 EET	G. Iliev 52'; Udoji 86'	(Report)		Stadium: Olivas; Attendance: 1,500; Referee: Kanama

28 January 2008 IFC Pego Cup; 1/2-Final	CSKA (Bulgaria)	2–1	(Romania) Unirea Urziceni	Pego, Spain
14:00 EET	Yurukov 38'; Garcés 48'; Udoji (yellow card) 21'; Machado (yellow card) 39'; Yanchev (yellow card) 83'; Gueye (yellow card) 88'	(Report)	Mara 42'; Munteanu (penalty missed); Bordeanu (yellow card) 38'; Aldea (yellow card) 85'; Bălan (yellow card) 86'	Stadium: Olivas; Attendance: 100; Referee: Francisco Roman

31 January 2008 IFC Pego Cup; Final	CSKA (Bulgaria)	0–0 (3–2 p)	(Russia) Lokomotiv Moscow	Pego, Spain
16:30 EET	Nastić (yellow card) 49'	(Report)	Denisov (yellow card) 29'	Stadium: Olivas; Attendance: 100
	Penalties
	Marquinhos (penalty scored); Petre (penalty scored); G. Iliev (penalty missed); Garcés (penalty scored)		(penalty missed) Bilyaletdinov; (penalty scored) Rodolfo; (penalty scored) Cociş; (penalty missed) Sychev

4 February 2008 Punta Umbría Cup; Leg 1	CSKA (Bulgaria)	2–2	(Russia) Khimki	Punta Umbría, Spain
19:00 EET	Yurukov 42'; Cássio 83'; Lanzaat (yellow card) 21'; Yurukov (yellow card) 39'; Nastić (yellow card) 58'	(Report)	Blatnjak 52' (pen.); Trivunović 74'; Pylypchuk (yellow card) 58'; Drozdov (yellow card) 60'; Nizamutdinov (red card) 72'	Stadium: Punta Umbría; Attendance: 50; Referee: Fernandes Chia

6 February 2008 Punta Umbría Cup; Leg 2	CSKA (Bulgaria)	0–0	(Slovenia) Interblock Ljubljana	Punta Umbría, Spain
18:30 EET	Sandanski (yellow card) 30'	(Report)		Stadium: Punta Umbría

9 February 2008 Friendly	CSKA (Bulgaria)	0–0	(Poland) Wisła Kraków	Cartaya, Spain
16:30 EET	Lanzaat (yellow card) 45+2'	(Report)	Głowacki (yellow card) 45+4'	Stadium: Rodriges Slavador

19 February 2008 Friendly	Pirin Blagoevgrad	0–3	CSKA	Blagoevgrad
15:00 EET	Koemdzhiev (yellow card) 25'; Georgiev (yellow card) 45'; Bodurov (yellow card) 50'; Kostadinov (yellow card) 86'	(Report)	Petre 18'; Tunchev 37'; Zé Rui 82'	Stadium: Hristo Botev; Attendance: 1,500; Referee: Ivaylo Stoyanov

23 February 2008 Friendly	CSKA	4–1	Minyor Pernik	Pancharevo
11:00 EET	Yordanov 15'; Gargorov 22'; Marquinhos 34' (pen.); Karam 88'	(Report)	Dyakov 38'; Dinkov (yellow card) 32'; Ashimov (yellow card) 32'	Stadium: CSKA Training Stadium; Attendance: 1,000

=== On-season (spring) ===
15 April 2008 Friendly	CSKA	7–2	Akademik Sofia	Pancharevo
17:00 EET	Yordan Yurukov 4'; Garcés 9'; Zé Rui 22'; I. Dimitrov 24', 27'; Tayanan 45'; Sandanski 74'	(Report)	Bozhov 64'; Veselinov 81'	Stadium: CSKA Training Stadium; Referee: Ivan Angelov

14 May 2008 Friendly	CSKA	3–2	Lokomotiv Mezdra	Pancharevo
15:00 EET	Vujadinović 14'; Gargorov 68'; Garcés 86'	(Report)	Pažin 21' (pen.); Fausto 56'	Stadium: CSKA Training Stadium; Referee: Ivan Angelov

== Competitions ==
=== A Group ===
==== Table ====
Pos	Team	Pld	W	D	L	GF	GA	GD	Pts	Qualification or relegation
1	CSKA Sofia (C)	30	24	6	0	53	11	+42	78	Did not obtain a license for European competitions (Note: CSKA failed to get a license for the competition due to unpaid debts)
2	Levski Sofia	30	19	5	6	56	19	+37	62	Qualification for Champions League third qualifying round
3	Lokomotiv Sofia	30	16	9	5	47	28	+19	57	Qualification for UEFA Cup second qualifying round (Note: Litex qualify via 2007–08 Bulgarian Cup)
4	Litex Lovech	30	16	8	6	51	26	+25	56	Qualification for UEFA Cup second qualifying round
5	Cherno More	30	13	9	8	39	28	+11	48	Qualification for UEFA Cup first qualifying round

Source: A PFG (in Bulgarian)
Rules for classification: 1st points; 2nd head-to-head points; 3rd head-to-head goal difference; 4th head-to-head goals scored; 5th head-to-head away goals scored; 6th goal difference; 7th goals scored
(C) Champions

==== Results summary ====
Overall								Home						Away					
Pld	W	D	L	GF	GA	GD	Pts	W	D	L	GF	GA	GD	W	D	L	GF	GA	GD
30	24	6	0	53	11	+42	78	13	2	0	31	5	+26	11	4	0	22	6	+16

Last updated: 17 May 2008.
Source: Soccerway

==== Results by round ====
Round	1	2	3	4	5	6	7	8	9	10	11	12	13	14	15	16	17	18	19	20	21	22	23	24	25	26	27	28	29	30
Ground	A	H	A	H	A	H	A	H	A	H	A	H	A	A	H	H	A	H	A	H	A	H	A	H	A	H	A	H	H	A
Result	D	W	W	W	W	W	W	W	W	W	W	W	D	W	W	D	W	W	D	W	D	W	W	W	W	W	W	W	D	W
Position	9	5	4	2	1	1	1	1	1	1	1	1	1	1	1	1	1	1	1	1	1	1	1	1	1	1	1	1	1	1

Source: CSKA Sofia league results
A = Away; H = Home; W = Win; D = Draw; L = Loss

==== Fixtures and results ====
11 August 2007 1	Litex	1–1	CSKA	Lovech
20:45 EET	Tom 75'; Sandrinho (red card) 45'; Popov (yellow card) 45'; Manolev (yellow card)	(Report)	Chilikov 81'; Tunchev (red card) 58'; Yanchev (red card) 80'; I. Petrov (yellow card); Dimitrov (yellow card); V. Iliev (yellow card); Vujadinović (yellow card); Udoji (yellow card); Marquinhos (yellow card)	Stadium: Gradski; Attendance: 6,500; Referee: Tsvetan Georgiev

19 August 2007 2	CSKA	2–0	Belasitsa	Sofia
19:30 EET	Garcés 28'; Chilikov 55'; Vujadinović (yellow card) 69'	(Report)	Marques (yellow card) 57'; Lichkov (yellow card) 62'; Gadzhev (yellow card) 72'	Stadium: Balgarska Armiya; Attendance: 0 Referee: Stoyan Aleksiev

25 August 2007 3	Spartak Varna	0–2	CSKA	Varna
18:00 EET	Palavestrić (yellow card) 41'; B. Iliev (yellow card) 46'; Zhekov (yellow card) 59'; S. Petrov (yellow card) 81'	(Report)	Vujadinović 39'; Petre 45'; Yanchev (yellow card) 31'; Vujadinović (yellow card) 36'; Zé Rui (yellow card) 54'; G. Iliev (yellow card)	Stadium: Spartak; Attendance: 6,000; Referee: Ahmed Ahmed

2 September 2007 4	CSKA	3–1	Vidima-Rakovski	Sofia
19:00 EET	Nei 10', 31'; Chilikov 38'; Marquinhos (yellow card) 58'	(Report)	Chalakov 28'; Lahchev (yellow card) 36'; Tsvetkov (yellow card) 49'	Stadium: Balgarska Armiya; Attendance: 1,800; Referee: Petar Tonchev

15 September 2007 5	Pirin	0–1	CSKA	Blagoevgrad
16:00 EET	Koemdzhiev (yellow card)	(Report)	Garcés 75'; Udoji (yellow card); Amuneke (yellow card)	Stadium: Hristo Botev; Attendance: 6,000; Referee: Kolyo Danev

23 September 2007 6	CSKA	3–1	Lokomotiv Sofia	Sofia
18:00 EET	Nei 12', 45+3', 51' (pen.); Nei (yellow card) 38'; Garcés (red card) 45'; Yanchev (yellow card) 65'; Udoji (yellow card); Kabous (yellow card)	(Report)	Atanasov 17'; Orachev (yellow card) 17'; Markov (yellow card) 38'; Dobrev (yellow card) 40'; Ivanov (yellow card) 43'; Lino (red card) 89'	Stadium: Balgarska Armiya; Attendance: 7,000; Referee: Anton Genov

29 September 2007 7	Slavia	0–1	CSKA	Sofia
16:30 EET	I.Iliev (yellow card) 45+1'; Dyakov (yellow card) 78'	(Report)	Amuneke 24'; Todorov (yellow card) 60'	Stadium: Ovcha Kupel; Attendance: 3,000; Referee: Stanislav Todorov

7 October 2007 8	CSKA	1–0	Beroe	Sofia
18:00 EET	G. Iliev 3'; Lanzaat (yellow card) 32' (yellow-red card)	(Report)	Vergilov (yellow card) (yellow-red card) 42'	Stadium: Balgarska Armiya; Attendance: 1,200; Referee: Stoyan Aleksiev

20 October 2007 9	Lokomotiv Plovdiv	0–1	CSKA	Plovdiv
15:30 EET	Anev (yellow card) 13'; Miliev (yellow card); Yoshev (yellow card)	(Report)	Nei 14' (pen.); Kotev (yellow card) 9' Marquinhos (yellow card) 42'; Zé Rui (yellow card) 63'; Petrov (yellow card) 87'; Petre (red card) 90+4'	Stadium: Lauta; Attendance: 4,000; Referee: Stefan Spasov

27 October 2007 10	CSKA	1–0	Cherno More	Sofia
14:30 EET	Amuneke 20'; Amuneke (yellow card)	(Report)	Peris (yellow card); Bachev (yellow card) 81'	Stadium: Balgarska Armiya; Attendance: 900; Referee: Anton Genov

3 November 2007 11	Marek	1–3	CSKA	Dupnitsa
14:00 EET	Krastovchev 27'; Z. Krastev (yellow card) 14'; Kyuchukov (yellow card) 35' (yellow-red card); Tasković (yellow card) 59'	(Report)	Tunchev 8'; Yanchev 12'; Machado 69'; V. Iliev (yellow card) 36'; Udoji (yellow card) 70'	Stadium: Marek; Attendance: 1,600; Referee: Aleksandar Kostadinov

11 November 2007 12	CSKA	2–0	Botev Plovdiv	Sofia
15:00 EET	Dimitrov 9'; Yanchev 37'	(Report)	Manchev (yellow card) 62'; Gadzhalov (yellow card) 73'	Stadium: Balgarska Armiya; Attendance: 500; Referee: Kolyo Danev

24 November 2007 13	Chernomorets	1–1	CSKA	Burgas
16:30 EET	Todorov 65'; Trajanov (yellow card); Tsankov (yellow card); Todorov (yellow card)	(Report)	Dimitrov 19'; G. Iliev (yellow card); Yanchev (yellow card)	Stadium: Lazur; Attendance: 10,000; Referee: Hristo Ristoskov

2 December 2007 14	Levski	0–1	CSKA	Sofia
15:30 EET	Minev (yellow card) 33'; Telkiyski (yellow card) 40'; Tasevski (yellow card) 76'; Borimirov (yellow card) 77'	(Report)	Filipe Machado 13'; Yanchev (yellow card) 22'; Dimitrov (yellow card) 45'; Amuneke (yellow card) 65'; Vujadinović (yellow card) 82'; Machado (yellow card) 90+2'	Stadium: Vasil Levski; Attendance: 17,000; Referee: Anton Genov

9 December 2007 15	CSKA	1–0	Vihren	Sofia
14:30 EET	V. Iliev 90'; Lanzaat (yellow card) 43'; Machado (yellow card) 46'; Zé Rui (yellow card) 90+2'	(Report)	Eriverton (yellow card) 45+1'; Velichkov (yellow card) 52'; Santos (yellow card) 71'; Sheytanov (yellow card) 88'; Reis (yellow card) 88'	Stadium: Balgarska Armiya; Attendance: 3,000; Referee: Asen Nikolov

1 March 2008 16	CSKA	0–0	Litex	Sofia
16:00 EET	Nei (yellow card) 70'; Yanchev (yellow card) 70'	(Report)	Jelenković (yellow card) 14'; Angelov (yellow card) 51'; Cambon (red card) 81'	Stadium: Balgarska Armiya; Attendance: 9,000; Referee: Anton Genov

8 March 2008 17	Belasitsa	1–3	CSKA	Petrich
15:30 EET	Trifonov 73'; Dyulgerov (yellow card) 50'; Gospodinov (yellow card) 54'	(Report)	Petre 28', 34'; Marquinhos 65' (pen.); Marquinhos (yellow card) 60'; Vujadinović (yellow card) 90+3'	Stadium: Tsar Samuil; Attendance: 7,000; Referee: Tsvetan Georgiev

14 March 2008 18	CSKA	3–2	Spartak Varna	Sofia
17:30 EET	Marinov 10' (o.g.); Dimitrov 22' (pen.); Yordanov 54'; Nei (yellow card); Yordanov (yellow card)	(Report)	Naydenov 44'; Ivanović 65'; Đukić (yellow card) 63'; B. Iliev (yellow card) 78'; Gerogiev (yellow card)	Stadium: Balgarska Armiya; Attendance: 3,000; Referee: Stefan Spasov

19 March 2008 19	Vidima-Rakovski	0–0	CSKA	Sevlievo
15:30 EET	Borisov (yellow card) 29'; Trifonov (yellow card) 45+2'; Stoychev (yellow card) 74'; Ivanov (yellow card) 90'	(Report)	Marquinhos (yellow card) 73'	Stadium: Rakovski; Attendance: 2,000; Referee: Aleksandar Kostadinov

23 March 2008 20	CSKA	3–0	Pirin	Sofia
17:00 EET	Petre 2'; Tunchev 57'; Nei 90+2' (pen.); Yanchev (yellow card) 23'	(Report)	Bodurov (yellow card) 12'; Rizov (yellow card) 17'; Kostadinov (yellow card); Vitanov (yellow card)	Stadium: Balgarska Armiya; Attendance: 3,000; Referee: Stanislav Todorov

29 March 2008 21	Lokomotiv Sofia	0–0	CSKA	Sofia
15:30 EET	Ivanov (yellow card) 24'; Donchev (yellow card) 31'; Markov (yellow card) 52'; Bandalovski (yellow card) 83'; Paskov (yellow card) 89'; Baldovaliev (yellow card)	(Report)	Marquinhos (yellow card) 26'; Dimitrov (yellow card) 45'	Stadium: Lokomotiv; Attendance: 5,000; Referee: Nikolay Yordanov

5 April 2008 22	CSKA	2–0	Slavia	Sofia
18:00 EET	Petre 16' (pen.); Tunchev 39'; Udoji (yellow card) 54'; Kotev (yellow card) 72'	(Report)	Gospodinov (yellow card) 15'; Simonović (red card) 27'; Petkov (yellow card) 52'	Stadium: Balgarska Armiya; Attendance: 3,000; Referee: Angel Bekyarov

9 April 2008 23	Beroe	0–1	CSKA	Stara Zagora
17:00 EET	Tanev (yellow card) 45+1'; Kolev (yellow card) 83'	(Report)	Petre 88'	Stadium: Beroe; Attendance: 10,000; Referee: Kolyo Danev

12 April 2008 24	CSKA	2–0	Lokomotiv Plovdiv	Sofia
19:00 EET	Udoji 57'; Todorov 62'; Nei (penalty missed); Machado (yellow card) 19'	(Report)	Dakson (yellow card) 12'; Sechkov (yellow card) 54'	Stadium: Balgarska Armiya; Attendance: 3,000; Referee: Asen Nikolov

20 April 2008 25	Cherno More	0–2	CSKA	Varna
16:00 EET	Manolov (yellow card) 25'; Stoyanov (yellow card) 64'; Aleks (yellow card) 72'; Sprećaković (yellow card)	(Report)	Nei 9', 13'; Marquinhos (yellow card) 22'	Stadium: Ticha; Attendance: 11,500; Referee: Anton Genov

25 April 2008 26	CSKA	4–0	Marek	Sofia
19:00 EET	Petre 14'; Nei 19', 51'; Yurukov 72'	(Report)	Sokolov (yellow card); Mladenov (yellow card)	Stadium: Balgarska Armiya; Attendance: 3,000; Referee: Vladimir Valkov

30 April 2008 27	Botev Plovdiv	1–3	CSKA	Plovdiv
17:00 EET	Hristov 32' (pen.); Arsov (yellow card) 3'; Kakalov (yellow card) 27'; Avramov (yellow card) 47'; Dimitrov (yellow card) 60'	(Report)	Nei 25', 44' (pen.); Petre 85'; Udoji (yellow card) 38'; Marquinhos (yellow card) 49'	Stadium: Hristo Botev; Attendance: 0 Referee: Stefan Spasov

4 May 2008 28	CSKA	3–0	Chernomorets	Sofia
18:00 EET	Petre 17', 27', 51'	(Report)		Stadium: Balgarska Armiya; Attendance: 5,000; Referee: Stanislav Stavrov

10 May 2008 29	CSKA	1–1	Levski	Sofia
18:00 EET	Dimitrov 56' (pen.); Tunchev (yellow card) 59'; Marquinhos (yellow card) 75'	(Report)	Krastovchev 43'; Tasevski (yellow card) 54'; Milanov (yellow card) 55'	Stadium: Balgarska Armiya; Attendance: 17,500; Referee: Anton Genov

17 May 2008 30	Vihren	1–2	CSKA	Sandanski
18:00 EET	Lukács 85'	(Report)	Nei 81'; Garcés 90+5'	Stadium: Gradski; Attendance: 2,500; Referee: Radostin Stanev

=== Bulgarian Cup ===
31 October 2007 Second Round	Lokomotiv Plovdiv	1–0	CSKA	Plovdiv
14:00 EET	Kamburov 61'; Miliev (yellow card) 38'; Dani Kiki (yellow card) 85'	(Report)	Todorov (yellow card) 6'; Garcés (yellow card) 72'	Stadium: Lauta; Attendance: 1,500; Referee: Nikolay Yordanov

=== UEFA Cup ===
==== Second qualifying round ====
16 August 2007 First leg	Omonia (Cyprus)	1–1	(Bulgaria) CSKA	Nicosia, Cyprus
20:00 EET	Kaiafas 14'; Ismail Ba (yellow card) 35'; Kaseke (yellow card) 70'; Kaiafas (yellow card) 86'; Dobrasinović (yellow card); Kakoyiannis (yellow card)	Report	Nei 1'; V. Iliev (yellow card) 49' (yellow-red card) 66'; Tunchev (yellow card) 53'; I. Petrov (yellow card) 85'; Kabous (yellow card) 90+1'	Stadium: GSP; Attendance: 16,000; Referee: Martin Atkinson (England)

30 August 2007 Second leg	CSKA (Bulgaria)	2–1 (3–2 agg.)	(Cyprus) Omonia	Sofia, Bulgaria
20:30 EET	Nei 17'; Chilikov 89'; Marquinhos (yellow card)	Report	Kakoyiannis 8'; Ismail Ba (red card) 78'; Veiga (red card) 90+1'; Magno (yellow card); Weisheimer (yellow card)	Stadium: Balgarska Armiya; Attendance: 20,000; Referee: Serge Gumienny (Belgium)

==== First round ====
20 September 2007 First leg	Toulouse (France)	0–0	(Bulgaria) CSKA	Toulouse, France
21:30 EET	Fofana (yellow card) 8'	Report	Yanchev (yellow card) 38'; Udoji (yellow card) 61'; Marquinhos (yellow card)	Stadium: Municipal; Attendance: 14,201; Referee: Nicolai Vollquartz (Denmark)

4 October 2007 Second leg	CSKA (Bulgaria)	1–1 (1–1(a) agg.)	(France) Toulouse	Sofia, Bulgaria
20:00 EET	Nei 65' (pen.); Dimitrov (yellow card) 56'; Nei (yellow card) 67'; Udoji (yellow card) 78' (yellow-red card) 85'; Petrov (yellow card) 90+3'	Report	Gignac 90+6'; Dieuze (yellow card) 43'; Ebondo (yellow card) 47'; Mansaré (yellow card) 67'; Sirieix (yellow card) 77'	Stadium: Balgarska Armiya; Attendance: 22,200; Referee: Bernhard Brüger (Austria)

== See also ==
- List of unbeaten football club seasons
