= 2006–07 PFC CSKA Sofia season =

CSKA Sofia
2006–07 season
- Chairman: Aleksandar Tomov
- Manager: Plamen Markov (until 12 March 2007); Stoycho Mladenov
- A Group: Second place
- Bulgarian Cup: Quarter-final
- Bulgarian Supercup: Winner
- UEFA Cup: First Round
- Top goalscorer: League: Eugen Trică (16); All: Eugen Trică (20)
- Highest home attendance: 17,000 vs Levski Sofia (7 April 2007)
- Lowest home attendance: 180 vs Rodopa Smolyan (20 May 2007)
| Home colours | Away colours |

The 2006–07 season was PFC CSKA Sofia's 59th consecutive season in A Group. This article shows player statistics and all matches (official and friendly) that the club have and will play during the 2006–07 season.

== Club ==
=== Coaching staff ===
| Position | Staff |
|---|---|
| Manager | (Bulgaria) Plamen Markov (until 12 March 2007) (Bulgaria) Stoycho Mladenov |
| Assistant First Team Coach | (Bulgaria) Angel Chervenkov (until 12 March 2007) (Bulgaria) Plamen Lipenski |
| Assistant First Team Coach | (Bulgaria) Anatoli Nankov |
| Goalkeeper Coach | (Bulgaria) Veselin Yanevski (until 12 2007) (Bulgaria) Stoyan Yordanov |
| Assistant First Team Fitness Coach | (Brazil) Renato Shmid |
| Match Analyst | (Bulgaria) Biser Tsolov |

=== Team kits ===
The team kits for the 2006–07 season are produced by Uhlsport and sponsored by Vivatel.

== Squad ==
As of 31 December 2006 Note: Flags indicate national team as defined under FIFA eligibility rules; some limited exceptions apply. Players may hold more than one non-FIFA nationality.

| No. | Pos. | Nation | Player |
|---|---|---|---|
| 1 | GK | SRB | Oliver Kovačević |
| 3 | DF | BUL | Aleksander Tunchev |
| 4 | DF | BRA | Daniel Morales |
| 5 | DF | BUL | Kiril Kotev |
| 7 | FW | BUL | Stoyko Sakaliev |
| 8 | FW | BUL | Velizar Dimitrov |
| 10 | MF | BUL | Georgi Iliev |
| 11 | FW | CIV | Guillaume Dah Zadi |
| 12 | GK | BUL | Ivaylo Petrov |
| 13 | FW | BUL | Miroslav Manolov |
| 14 | DF | BUL | Valentin Iliev |
| 15 | DF | MKD | Robert Petrov |
| 16 | DF | BUL | Aleksandar Branekov |
| 19 | FW | BUL | Evgeni Yordanov |

| No. | Pos. | Nation | Player |
|---|---|---|---|
| 18 | MF | ROU | Florentin Petre |
| 21 | MF | ROU | Eugen Trică |
| 20 | MF | BUL | Yordan Yurukov |
| 21 | MF | NGR | Shikoze Udoji |
| 22 | GK | BUL | Ilko Pirgov |
| 23 | MF | MAR | Abderrahman Kabous |
| 6 | MF | BIH | Sergej Jakirović |
| 25 | DF | BUL | Ivan Ivanov |
| 26 | MF | BUL | Nikolay Chipev |
| 27 | MF | BRA | Tiago Silva |
| 28 | FW | ROU | Alexandru Piţurcă |
| 30 | MF | BUL | Yordan Todorov |
| 77 | FW | POR | José Emilio Furtado |

== Competitions ==
=== A Group ===
==== Table ====
| Pos | Team | Pld | W | D | L | GF | GA | GD | Pts | Qualification or relegation |
|---|---|---|---|---|---|---|---|---|---|---|
| 1 | Levski Sofia (C) | 30 | 24 | 5 | 1 | 96 | 13 | +83 | 77 | Qualification for Champions League second qualifying round |
| 2 | CSKA Sofia | 30 | 23 | 3 | 4 | 68 | 13 | +55 | 72 (Note: CSKA Sofia ahead of Lokomotiv Sofia on head-to-head record; Lokomotiv Sofia–CSKA Sofia 1–1, CSKA Sofia–Lokomotiv Sofia 4–1.) | Qualification for UEFA Cup second qualifying round |
| 3 | Lokomotiv Sofia | 30 | 23 | 3 | 4 | 70 | 28 | +42 | 72 | Qualification for UEFA Cup second qualifying round |
| 4 | Litex Lovech | 30 | 19 | 5 | 6 | 65 | 29 | +36 | 62 | Qualification for UEFA Cup first qualifying round |
| 5 | Slavia Sofia | 30 | 14 | 7 | 9 | 47 | 75 | −28 | 49 | |

Source: A PFG (in Bulgarian)
Rules for classification: 1st points; 2nd head-to-head points; 3rd head-to-head goal difference; 4th head-to-head goals scored; 5th head-to-head away goals scored; 6th goal difference; 7th goals scored; 8th "sportsmanship" (R & Y cards); 9th draw
(C) Champions

==== Results summary ====
| Overall | | | | | | | | Home | | | | | | Away | | | | | |
| Pld | W | D | L | GF | GA | GD | Pts | W | D | L | GF | GA | GD | W | D | L | GF | GA | GD |
|---|---|---|---|---|---|---|---|---|---|---|---|---|---|---|---|---|---|---|---|
| 30 | 23 | 3 | 4 | 68 | 13 | +55 | 72 | 13 | 1 | 1 | 42 | 4 | +38 | 10 | 2 | 3 | 26 | 9 | +17 |

Last updated: 17 May 2007.
Source: Soccerway

==== Results by round ====
| Round | 1 | 2 | 3 | 4 | 5 | 6 | 7 | 8 | 9 | 10 | 11 | 12 | 13 | 14 | 15 | 16 | 17 | 18 | 19 | 20 | 21 | 22 | 23 | 24 | 25 | 26 | 27 | 28 | 29 | 30 |
|---|---|---|---|---|---|---|---|---|---|---|---|---|---|---|---|---|---|---|---|---|---|---|---|---|---|---|---|---|---|---|
| Ground | A | H | A | H | A | A | H | A | H | A | H | A | H | A | H | H | A | H | A | H | H | A | H | A | H | A | H | A | H | A |
| Result | W | W | W | W | W | L | W | L | W | D | W | W | W | W | W | D | D | W | W | W | L | W | W | W | W | W | W | L | W | W |
| Position | 4 | 2 | 1 | 1 | 1 | 3 | 2 | 3 | 3 | 3 | 3 | 3 | 2 | 2 | 2 | 2 | 2 | 2 | 2 | 2 | 3 | 3 | 3 | 3 | 2 | 2 | 2 | 3 | 2 | 2 |

Source: CSKA Sofia league results
W = Win; D = Draw; L = Loss

==== Fixtures and results ====
| 5 August 2006 1 | Cherno More | 0–2 | CSKA | Varna |
| 18:00 | | | Iliev 16'; Tunchev 29' | Stadium: Ticha Stadium; Attendance: 11,000; Referee: Tsvetan Georgiev |

| 13 August 2006 2 | CSKA | 3–0 | Lokomotiv Plovdiv | Sofia |
| 20:30 | Dimitrov 40'; Tunchev 41'; Jakirović 47' | | | Stadium: Bulgarska Armiya Stadium; Attendance: 3,500; Referee: Aleksandar Kostadinov |

| 19 August 2006 3 | Litex | 0–1 | CSKA | Lovech |
| 20:30 | | | Tiago Silva 20' | Stadium: Lovech Stadium; Attendance: 5,000; Referee: Hristo Ristoskov |

| 27 August 2006 4 | CSKA | 4–0 | Spartak Varna | Sofia |
| 20:00 | Tunchev 45+1'; Trică 63' 69'; Manolov 74' | | | Stadium: Bulgarska Armiya Stadium; Attendance: 1,000; Referee: Marin Bogdev |

| 9 September 2006 5 | Rilski Sportist | 1–3 | CSKA | Samokov |
| 17:00 | Gemedjiev 52' | | Petre 21'; Dimitrov 25' (pen.); Trica 31' | Stadium: Iskar Stadium; Attendance: 3,500; Referee: Stefan Spasov |

| 17 September 2006 6 | Levski | 1–0 | CSKA | Sofia |
| 20:00 | Bardon 49' (pen.) | | | Stadium: Vasil Levski National Stadium; Attendance: 11,442; Referee: Hristo Ristoskov |

| 23 September 2006 7 | CSKA | 6–1 | Slavia | Sofia |
| 18:00 | Dimitrov 12' (pen.); Kotev 20'; Petre 31' 85'; Dah Zadi 65'; Petrov 83' (pen.) | | Kolev 35' | Stadium: Bulgarska Armiya Stadium; Attendance: 1,500; Referee: Momchil Vraykov |

| 1 October 2006 8 | Botev Plovdiv | 1–0 | CSKA | Plovdiv |
| 15:30 | Kakalov 13' | | | Stadium: Hristo Botev Stadium; Attendance: 4,500; Referee: Stanislav Todorov |

| 15 October 2006 9 | CSKA | 2–0 | Beroe | Sofia |
| 18:00 | Trică 43'; Dah Zadi 81' | | | Stadium: Bulgarska Armiya Stadium; Attendance: 1,500; Referee: Nikolay Yordanov |

| 23 October 2006 10 | Lokomotiv Sofia | 1–1 | CSKA | Sofia |
| 16:00 | Genkov 6' (pen.) | | Trică 40' | Stadium: Lokomotiv Stadium; Attendance: 2,500; Referee: Angel Bekyarov |

| 28 October 2006 11 | CSKA | 6–0 | Chernomorets BS | Sofia |
| 16:00 | Trică 5' (pen.) 48'; Petre 32'; Tiago Silva 41'; Piţurcă 68' 87' | | | Stadium: Vasil Levski National Stadium; Attendance: 700; Referee: Martin Bogdev |

| 5 November 2006 12 | Vihren | 0–2 | CSKA | Sandanski |
| 14:00 | | | Tunchev 45'; Trică 60' | Stadium: Sandanski Stadium; Attendance: 2,000; Referee: Nikolay Yordanov |

| 12 November 2006 13 | CSKA | 2–0 | Marek | Sofia |
| 16:00 | Dimitrov 35'; Trică 52' (pen.) | | | Stadium: Bulgarska Armiya Stadium; Attendance: 1,500; Referee: Stanislav Todorov |

| 18 November 2006 14 | Rodopa | 1–2 | CSKA | Smolyan |
| 14:30 | Todorov 89' | | Trică 17'; Yurukov 73' | Stadium: Septemvri Stadium; Attendance: 3,000; Referee: Tsvetan Georgiev |

| 26 November 2006 15 | CSKA | 2–1 | Belasitsa | Sofia |
| 14:30 | Dah Zadi 50'; Trică 70' (pen.) | | Du Bala 31' | Stadium: Bulgarska Armiya Stadium; Attendance: 1,200; Referee: Ivaylo Bozev |

| 4 March 2007 16 | CSKA | 0–0 | Cherno More | Sofia |
| 15:00 | | | | Stadium: Bulgarska Armiya Stadium; Attendance: 7,500; Referee: Angel Angelov |

| 10 March 2007 17 | Lokomotiv Plovdiv | 1–1 | CSKA | Plovdiv |
| 14:30 | Halimi 37' | | Petre 77' | Stadium: Lokomotiv Stadium; Attendance: 6,500; Referee: Hristo Ristoskov |

| 18 March 2007 18 | CSKA | 2–0 | Litex | Sofia |
| 15:00 | Trică 41'; Yordanov 79' | | | Stadium: Bulgarska Armiya Stadium; Attendance: 13,000; Referee: Mateo Trefeloni (Italy) |

| 21 March 2007 19 | Spartak Varna | 1–3 | CSKA | Varna |
| 15:30 | Kunchev 86' | | Yordanov 53'; Trică 62'; Tunchev 82' | Stadium: Spartak Stadium; Attendance: 4,000; Referee: Anton Genov |

| 1 April 2007 20 | CSKA | 3–0 | Rilski Sportist | Sofia |
| 17:00 | Petre 20'; Yordanov 60'; Udoji 81' | | | Stadium: Bulgarska Armiya Stadium; Attendance: 5,000; Referee: Kolyo Danev |

| 7 April 2007 21 | CSKA | 0–1 | Levski | Sofia |
| 15:00 | | | Yovov 20' | Stadium: Vasil Levski National Stadium; Attendance: 17,000; Referee: Helmut Fischer (Germany) |

| 14 April 2007 22 | Slavia | 0–1 | CSKA | Sofia |
| 15:00 | | | Yurukov 54' | Stadium: Slavia Stadium; Attendance: 2,000; Referee: Anton Genov |

| 18 April 2007 23 | CSKA | 2–0 | Botev Plovdiv | Sofia |
| 19:00 | Petre 30'; Iliev 44' | | | Stadium: Bulgarska Armiya Stadium; Attendance: 1,500; Referee: Ivaylo Petrov |

| 22 April 2007 24 | Beroe | 0–1 | CSKA | Stara Zagora |
| 15:00 | | | Yurukov 66' | Stadium: Beroe Stadium; Referee: Nikolay Yordanov |

| 29 April 2007 25 | CSKA | 4–1 | Lokomotiv Sofia | Sofia |
| 17:30 | Trică 15'; Todorov 20'; Petrov 44'; Udoji 81' | | Genkov 78' | Stadium: Bulgarska Armiya Stadium; Attendance: 2,500; Referee: Ľuboš Micheľ (Slovakia) |

| 4 May 2007 26 | Chernomorets BS | 0–6 | CSKA | Sofia |
| 18:00 | | | Todorov 11'; Iliev 27'; Trică 33' (pen.) 65'; Kabous 37'; Tunchev 90+2' | Stadium: Bulgarska Armiya Stadium; Attendance: 2,000; Referee: Petar Tonchev |

| 12 May 2007 27 | CSKA | 5–0 | Vihren | Sofia |
| 18:00 | Kotev 27'; Yordanov 40'; Petre 65' 69'; Todorov 90' | | | Stadium: Bulgarska Armiya Stadium; Attendance: 1,500; Referee: Angel Angelov |

| 16 May 2007 28 | Marek | 1–0 | CSKA | Dupnitsa |
| 17:30 | Krastovchev 81' | | | Stadium: Bonchuk Stadium; Attendance: 1,200; Referee: Stanislav Todorov |

| 20 May 2007 29 | CSKA | 1–0 | Rodopa | Sofia |
| 16:30 | Tunchev 10' | | | Stadium: Bulgarska Armiya Stadium; Attendance: 180; Referee: Ventsislav Koznichki |

| 27 May 2007 30 | Belasitsa | 1–3 | CSKA | Petrich |
| 17:30 | Kabranov 42' | | Petre 48'; Sakaliev 56'; Morales 73' | Stadium: Tsar Samuil Stadium; Attendance: 2,500; Referee: Anton Genov |

=== Bulgarian Cup ===
| 8 November 2006 Second Round | Chavdar B.S. | 0–3 | CSKA | Byala Slatina |
| | | | Dah Zadi 36'; Piţurcă 71', 81' | Stadium: Chavdar Stadium; Attendance: 3,000; Referee: Stanislav Stavrov |

| 30 November 2006 Third Round | Montana | 1–2 | CSKA | Montana |
| | Antonov 86' (pen.) | | Yurukov 57'; Trică 80' | Stadium: Ogosta Stadium; Attendance: 5,000; Referee: Ventsislav Koznichki |

| 11 April 2007 Quarter-final | Beroe | 1–0 (a.e.t.) | CSKA | Stara Zagora |
| | Lopes 120' | | | Stadium: Beroe Stadium; Attendance: 3,500; Referee: Paulo Paraty (Portugal) |

=== Bulgarian Super Cup ===
| 30 July 2006 Final | Levski | 0–0 (a.e.t.) (0–3 p) | CSKA | Sofia |
| 20:00 | | | | Stadium: Vasil Levski National Stadium; Attendance: 9,751; Referee: Momchil Vraykov |
| | Penalties |
| | Topuzakov (penalty missed); Domovchiyski (penalty missed); Borimirov (penalty missed) | | (penalty scored) Trică; (penalty scored) Todorov; (penalty scored) Petre |

=== UEFA Cup ===
==== First qualifying round ====
| 13 July 2006 First leg | Dinamo Tirana (Albania) | 0–1 | (Bulgaria) CSKA | Tirana, Albania |
| 18:30 | | Report | Trică 86' | Stadium: Selman Stërmasi Stadium; Attendance: 1,000; Referee: Haim Jakov (Israel) |

| 27 July 2006 Second leg | CSKA (Bulgaria) | 4–1 (5–1 agg.) | (Albania) Dinamo Tirana | Sofia, Bulgaria |
| 20:00 | Trică 36' 53'; Furtado 49'; Petre 75' | Report | Kastel 12' | Stadium: Bulgarska Armiya Stadium; Attendance: 4,321; Referee: János Megyebíró (Hungary) |

==== Second qualifying round ====
| 10 August 2006 First leg | CSKA (Bulgaria) | 0–0 | (Serbia) Hajduk Kula | Sofia, Bulgaria |
| 19:30 | | Report | | Stadium: Bulgarska Armiya Stadium; Attendance: 3,128; Referee: Ian Stokes (Ireland) |

| 24 August 2006 Second leg | Hajduk Kula (Serbia) | 1–1 (a.e.t.) (1–1(a) agg.) | (Bulgaria) CSKA | Belgrade, Serbia |
| 21:30 | Stančić 100' | Report | Tunchev 119' | Stadium: Stadion FK Crvena Zvezda; Attendance: 584; Referee: Ihor Ishchenko (Ukraine) |

==== First round ====
| 14 September 2006 First leg | Beşiktaş (Turkey) | 2–0 | (Bulgaria) CSKA | Istanbul, Turkey |
| 19:45 | Kléberson 82'; Güleç 92' | Report | | Stadium: İnönü Stadium; Attendance: 22,602; Referee: Bruno Paixão (Portugal) |

| 28 September 2006 Second leg | CSKA (Bulgaria) | 2–2 (a.e.t.) (2–4 agg.) | (Turkey) Beşiktaş | Sofia, Bulgaria |
| 19:30 | Iliev 60'; Tunchev 69' | Report | Nobre 93'; Bobô 103' | Stadium: Bulgarska Armiya Stadium; Attendance: 12,000; Referee: Dick van Egmond (Netherlands) |

== UEFA Club Rankings ==
This is the current UEFA Club Rankings, including season 2005–06.

| Rank | Team | Points | Mvmnt |
|---|---|---|---|
| 108 | (Scotland) Heart of Midlothian | 21.064 | ▲ (+9) |
| 109 | (France) Stade Rennais | 20.706 | ▲ (+10) |
| 110 | (Germany) Eintracht Frankfurt | 20.640 | New |
| 111 | (Bulgaria) CSKA Sofia | 20.112 | ▲ (+1) |
| 112 | (Netherlands) FC Utrecht | 19.995 | ▼ (-15) |
| 113 | (Switzerland) Grasshopper Club | 19.869 | ▼ (-11) |
| 114 | (France) FC Lorient | 19.706 | ▲ (+12) |
