= 2007–08 A Group =

60th completed season of top-tier football league in Bulgaria

A Group
- Season: 2007–08
- Dates: 11 August 2007 – 17 May 2008
- Champions: CSKA Sofia (31st title)
- Relegated: Beroe; Vidima-Rakovski; Marek
- Champions League: Levski Sofia
- UEFA Cup: Lokomotiv Sofia; Litex; Cherno More
- Intertoto Cup: Chernomorets
- Matches: 240
- Goals: 558 (2.33 per match)
- Top goalscorer: Georgi Hristov (19 goals)
- Biggest home win: Cherno More 7–0 Vidima-Rakovski
- Biggest away win: Belasitsa 1–6 Chernomorets
- Highest scoring: Levski 6–2 Botev (8 goals)

The 2007–08 A Group was the 60th season of the Bulgarian A Football Group since its establishment in 1948 and the 84th of a Bulgarian national top football division. The season began on 11 August 2007 and ended on 17 May 2008. CSKA Sofia won their 31st record league title. Last time they scooped the title was in 2004–05 season. CSKA won the league without a single defeat, 16 points ahead of their archrival Levski Sofia.

Despite the convincing results during the season, CSKA failed to get a UEFA license to participate in the Champions League due to unpaid debts. The guilt for the disaster in the club was taken by their chairman Aleksandar Tomov.

== Teams ==
=== Team changes ===
At the end of the last season, Conegliano German, Rodopa Smolyan, and Rilski Sportist Samokov were relegated after finishing in the bottom three places of the 2006–07 season. Conegliano and Rilski Sportist survived only one season in the elite, while Rodopa ended a four-year stint in the A Group.

The relegated teams were replaced by three teams from the 2006–07 B Group, including the winners of the East and West B Groups, as well as the playoff winner decided between the runner-ups of the two B Groups. Chernomorets Burgas and Pirin Blagoevgrad were promoted directly, while Vidima-Rakovski Sevlievo defeated Naftex Burgas to gain the last promotion spot. Chernomorets made its debut in the top tier of Bulgarian football, Pirin return after a one-year absence, while Vidima-Rakovski return after a two-year absence.

=== Stadia and locations ===
Location of teams in 2007–08 A Group
Sofia 2007–08 A Group football clubs

Team	Location	Stadium	Capacity
Belasitsa	Petrich	Tsar Samuil Stadium	9,500
Beroe	Stara Zagora	Beroe Stadium	13,512
Botev	Plovdiv	Hristo Botev Stadium	22,000
Cherno More	Varna	Ticha Stadium	8,250
Chernomorets	Burgas	Lazur Stadium	18,037
CSKA	Sofia	Balgarska Armiya Stadium	22,015
Levski	Sofia	Georgi Asparuhov Stadium	29,200
Litex	Lovech	Lovech Stadium	7,050
Lokomotiv	Plovdiv	Lokomotiv	13,800
Lokomotiv	Sofia	Lokomotiv Sofia	22,000
Marek	Dupnitsa	Bonchuk Stadium	16,050
Pirin	Blagoevgrad	Hristo Botev Stadium^{1}	11,000
Slavia	Sofia	Ovcha Kupel Stadium	18,000
Spartak	Varna	Spartak Stadium	7,500
Vidima-Rakovski	Sevlievo	Rakovski Stadium	8,816
Vihren	Sandanski	Sandanski Stadium	6,000

^{1^. Stadiums of Botev Plovdiv and Pirin Blagoevgrad have the same names, but they are placed in different cities.}

== League table ==
Pos	Team	Pld	W	D	L	GF	GA	GD	Pts	Qualification or relegation
1	CSKA Sofia (C)	30	24	6	0	53	11	+42	78	Did not obtain a license for European competitions (Note: CSKA failed to get a license for the competition due to unpaid debts)
2	Levski Sofia	30	19	5	6	56	19	+37	62	Qualification for Champions League third qualifying round
3	Lokomotiv Sofia	30	16	9	5	47	28	+19	57	Qualification for UEFA Cup second qualifying round (Note: Litex qualify via 2007–08 Bulgarian Cup)
4	Litex Lovech	30	16	8	6	51	26	+25	56	Qualification for UEFA Cup second qualifying round
5	Cherno More	30	13	9	8	39	28	+11	48	Qualification for UEFA Cup first qualifying round
6	Chernomorets Burgas	30	13	8	9	39	32	+7	47	Qualification for Intertoto Cup second round
7	Slavia Sofia	30	13	8	9	38	28	+10	47	
8	Pirin Blagoevgrad	30	13	7	10	33	29	+4	46	
9	Lokomotiv Plovdiv	30	12	7	11	37	28	+9	43	
10	Vihren	30	9	6	15	26	29	−3	33	
11	Spartak Varna	30	8	7	15	21	34	−13	31	
12	Botev Plovdiv	30	8	6	16	36	54	−18	30	
13	Belasitsa Petrich	30	7	5	18	23	43	−20	26	
14	Beroe (R)	30	6	8	16	23	39	−16	26	Relegation to 2008–09 B Group
15	Vidima-Rakovski (R)	30	4	6	20	17	61	−44	18	Relegation to 2008–09 B Group
16	Marek (R)	30	5	3	22	16	66	−50	18	Relegation to 2008–09 B Group

Source: A PFG (in Bulgarian)
Rules for classification: 1st points; 2nd head-to-head points; 3rd head-to-head goal difference; 4th head-to-head goals scored; 5th head-to-head away goals scored; 6th goal difference; 7th goals scored
(C) Champions; (R) Relegated

== Results ==
Home \ Away	BEL	BSZ	BOT	CHM	CHB	CSK	LEV	LIT	LPL	LSO	MAR	PIR	SLA	SPV	VRA	VIH
Belasitsa Petrich		3–1	3–1	1–1	1–6	1–3	0–0	1–2	0–0	0–1	1–0	0–1	1–2	2–1	1–0	1–0
Beroe	2–1		3–1	0–0	2–1	0–1	0–1	2–2	0–0	1–3	1–1	2–2	2–2	0–0	2–0	2–0
Botev Plovdiv	2–0	1–0		1–1	0–0	1–3	0–3	1–2	1–2	2–2	4–0	0–0	3–0	2–0	5–0	1–0
Cherno More	1–1	1–0	2–0		2–1	0–2	0–1	2–1	2–1	1–1	0–0	1–0	1–0	0–0	7–0	1–0
Chernomorets Burgas	0–0	2–0	3–1	0–1		1–1	2–1	2–0	1–0	1–1	1–0	1–4	2–0	1–0	1–0	1–0
CSKA Sofia	2–0	1–0	2–0	1–0	3–0		1–1	0–0	2–0	3–1	4–0	3–0	2–0	3–2	3–1	1–0
Levski Sofia	4–0	1–0	6–2	4–0	2–1	0–1		0–1	3–1	0–1	4–2	4–0	2–1	3–0	3–0	1–0
Litex Lovech	2–0	1–1	6–0	1–1	2–1	1–1	2–1		3–1	1–1	4–0	1–0	1–1	1–0	4–1	2–0
Lokomotiv Plovdiv	1–0	2–0	4–0	2–1	1–1	0–1	1–0	1–0		1–2	0–0	0–0	1–1	1–0	6–1	2–1
Lokomotiv Sofia	1–0	3–0	2–2	4–3	4–0	0–0	0–0	1–2	2–1		2–0	0–3	1–2	1–0	2–0	3–2
Marek	0–3	0–1	1–0	1–4	1–4	1–3	0–4	0–3	2–1	1–4		0–2	1–0	1–0	2–1	0–3
Pirin Blagoevgrad	2–1	1–0	1–0	1–0	1–0	0–1	1–1	1–3	1–1	1–3	4–0		1–0	1–2	3–1	0–0
Slavia Sofia	3–1	2–0	4–2	3–1	1–1	0–1	0–0	1–0	1–0	0–0	2–1	1–0		5–0	2–0	0–0
Spartak Varna	1–0	1–0	2–2	0–1	1–1	0–2	1–2	0–0	2–1	0–1	2–0	2–0	2–1		0–0	0–1
Vidima-Rakovski	1–0	3–1	0–1	0–3	1–1	0–0	1–3	3–2	0–3	0–0	1–0	0–1	0–2	1–1		0–1
Vihren	2–0	2–0	2–0	1–1	1–2	1–2	0–1	2–1	0–2	1–0	3–1	1–1	1–1	0–1	1–1	

Source: A PFG (in Bulgarian)
Legend: Blue = home team win; Yellow = draw; Red = away team win.

== Champions ==
CSKA Sofia

Goalkeepers
1	(Cameroon) Daniel Bekono	0	(0)
12	(Bulgaria) Ivaylo Petrov	28	(0)
22	(Bulgaria) Ilko Pirgov	2	(0)

Defenders
2	(Serbia) Nenad Nastić	7	(0)
3	(Bulgaria) Aleksandar Tunchev	26	(3)
6	(Bulgaria) Kiril Kotev	18	(0)
13	(Montenegro) Nikola Vujadinović	24	(1)
14	(Bulgaria) Valentin Iliev*	14	(1)
15	(North Macedonia) Robert Petrov	0	(0)
27	(Netherlands) Quido Lanzaat	8	(0)
30	(Bulgaria) Yordan Todorov	26	(1)
84	(Brazil) Filipe Machado	15	(2)

Midfielders
5	(Bulgaria) Todor Yanchev	28	(2)
10	(Bulgaria) Georgi Iliev	16	(1)
11	(Bulgaria) Emil Gargorov	13	(0)
16	(Bulgaria) Ivaylo Dimitrov	1	(0)
17	(Cape Verde) Zé Rui	13	(0)
18	(Romania) Florentin Petre	24	(11)
20	(Bulgaria) Yordan Yurukov	8	(1)
21	(Nigeria) Chigozie Udoji	23	(1)
23	(Morocco) Abderrahman Kabous*	8	(0)
24	(Bulgaria) Aleksandar Tonev	2	(0)
28	(Bulgaria) Marquinhos	25	(1)

Forwards
8	(Bulgaria) Velizar Dimitrov	24	(4)
9	(Panama) José Luis Garcés	14	(3)
19	(Bulgaria) Evgeni Yordanov	8	(1)
99	(Brazil) Nei	29	(14)
	(Nigeria) Kevin Amuneke*	10	(2)
	(Bulgaria) Georgi Chilikov*	12	(3)

Manager
(Bulgaria) Stoycho Mladenov

- Iliev, Kabous, Amuneke and Chilikov left the club during a season.

== Top scorers ==
Rank	Scorer	Club	Goals
1	(Bulgaria) Georgi Hristov	Botev Plovdiv	19
2	(Brazil) Nei	CSKA Sofia	14
3	(Bulgaria) Marcho Dafchev	Lokomotiv Sofia	13
3	(North Macedonia) Zoran Baldovaliev	Lokomotiv Sofia	13
5	(Bulgaria) Aleksandar Aleksandrov	Cherno More Varna	12
6	(Bulgaria) Plamen Krumov	Chernomorets Burgas	11
6	(Romania) Florentin Petre	CSKA Sofia	11
6	(Bulgaria) Ivelin Popov	Litex Lovech	11
9	(Argentina) Germán Pietrobon	Pirin Blagoevgrad	10
10	(Bulgaria) Anatoli Todorov	Lokomotiv Plovdiv	9
10	(Bulgaria) Miroslav Manolov	Cherno More Varna	9
10	(Bulgaria) Ivan Naydenov	Spartak Varna	9

== Attendances ==
#	Club	Average
1	CSKA Sofia	5,313
2	Botev	5,000
3	Beroe	4,967
4	Levski	4,940
5	Cherno More	4,533
6	Chernomorets	2,953
7	Lokomotiv Plovdiv	2,833
8	Pirin	2,627
9	Vihren	2,227
10	Varna	2,097
11	Lokomotiv Sofia	1,947
12	Belasitsa	1,940
13	Lovech	1,687
14	Slavia Sofia	1,291
15	Vidima-Rakovski	1,147
16	Marek	748
