= 2006 Bulgarian Supercup =

Levski Sofia	CSKA Sofia
A Group	A Group
0	0
- CSKA Sofia won 3–0 on penalties
- Date: 30 July 2006
- Venue: Vasil Levski National Stadium, Sofia, Bulgaria
- Referee: Momchil Vraykov (Pleven)
- Attendance: 9,751

The 2006 Bulgarian Supercup was the fourth Bulgarian Supercup match, a football match which was contested between the "A" professional football group champion, Levski Sofia, and the winner of Bulgarian Cup, CSKA Sofia. The match was held on 30 July 2006 at the Vasil Levski National Stadium in Sofia, Bulgaria. CSKA beat Levski 3–0 (after penalties) to win their second Bulgarian Supercup.

== Match details ==
30 July 2006
20:00

Levski Sofia	0–0 (a.e.t.)	CSKA Sofia
Penalties
Topuzakov (penalty missed); Domovchiyski (penalty missed); Borimirov (penalty missed)	0–3	(penalty scored) Trică; (penalty scored) Todorov; (penalty scored) Petre

Vasil Levski National Stadium, Sofia
Attendance: 9,751
Referee: Momchil Vraykov (Pleven)

Levski Sofia	CSKA Sofia

Levski:
GK	1	(Bulgaria) Georgi Petkov
DF	20	(Bulgaria) Stanislav Angelov
DF	11	(Bulgaria) Elin Topuzakov (c)
DF	4	(Croatia) Igor Tomašić (substituted off) 43'
DF	25	(Brazil) Lúcio Wagner (yellow card) 90'
MF	6	(Nigeria) Richard Eromoigbe (yellow card) 61' (yellow-red card) 114'
MF	7	(Bulgaria) Daniel Borimirov (yellow card) 13'
MF	21	(Bulgaria) Dimitar Telkiyski (yellow card) 90+1'
MF	10	(Bulgaria) Hristo Yovov (substituted off) 53'
FW	27	(France) Cédric Bardon (red card) 88'
FW	28	(Bulgaria) Emil Angelov (substituted off) 98'
Substitutes:
GK	88	(Bulgaria) Nikolay Mihaylov
DF	3	(Bulgaria) Zhivko Milanov (substituted on) 43'
DF	14	(Bulgaria) Veselin Minev
FW	17	(Bulgaria) Valeri Domovchiyski (substituted on) 98'
MF	18	(Bulgaria) Miroslav Ivanov
MF	19	(Bulgaria) Atanas Bornosuzov
FW	77	(Bulgaria) Milan Koprivarov (substituted on) 53'
Manager:
(Bulgaria) Stanimir Stoilov

CSKA:
GK	12	(Bulgaria) Ivaylo Petrov
DF	30	(Bulgaria) Yordan Todorov (yellow card) 71'
DF	3	(Bulgaria) Aleksandar Tunchev
DF	15	(North Macedonia) Robert Petrov
DF	14	(Bulgaria) Valentin Iliev (c) (substituted off) 71'
MF	6	(Bosnia and Herzegovina) Sergej Jakirović (yellow card) 15'
MF	27	(Brazil) Tiago Silva (yellow card) 87' (substituted off) 115'
MF	10	(Bulgaria) Georgi Iliev (yellow card) 69'
MF	18	(Romania) Florentin Petre (yellow card) 96'
FW	19	(Romania) Eugen Trică (yellow card) 64'
FW	77	(Portugal) Jose Furtado (substituted off) 39'
Substitutes:
GK	22	(Bulgaria) Ilko Pirgov
DF	5	(Bulgaria) Kiril Kotev (substituted on) 71'
FW	11	(Ivory Coast) Guillaume Dah Zadi (substituted on) 39' (yellow card) 85'
MF	20	(Bulgaria) Yordan Yurukov (substituted on) 115' (yellow card) 116'
DF	25	(Bulgaria) Ivan Ivanov
FW	31	(Bulgaria) Miroslav Manolov
MF	34	(Bulgaria) Daniel Georgiev
Manager:
(Bulgaria) Plamen Markov
