= Abrashev =

Abrashev is a Bulgarian family name and it may refer to:

- Peter Abrashev (1866–1930) - Bulgarian lawyer, scientist and politician;
- George Abrashev (born 1924) - Bulgarian choreographer;
- Bozhidar Abrashev (1936–2006) - Bulgarian composer and Minister of Culture;
- Stoyan Abrashev (born 1988) - Bulgarian footballer
