= Stanislav Petrov (footballer) =

Bulgarian footballer

Personal information
- Full name: Stanislav Marinov Petrov
- Date of birth: 14 August 1979 (age 47)
- Place of birth: Bulgaria
- Height: 1.83 m (6 ft 0 in)
- Position: Defender

Senior career*
Years	Team	Apps	(Gls)
2004–2006	Spartak Varna	52	(0)
2006–2007	Naftex Burgas	24	(0)
2007–2009	Spartak Varna	44	(1)
2010	Dobrudzha Dobrich	8	(0)
2010–2011	Dorostol Silistra	25	(0)
2013	Oborishte	13	(0)
- * Club domestic league appearances and goals as of 1 August 2013

Stanislav Petrov (Bulgarian: Станислав Петров) is a former Bulgarian footballer, who played as a defender. He played for clubs including FC Spartak Varna and FC Dorostol Silistra.
