= Nikita Denisov =

Russian footballer

Personal information
- Full name: Nikita Olegovich Denisov
- Date of birth: 7 April 1986 (age 40)
- Height: 1.92 m (6 ft 4 in)
- Position: Defender

Youth career
- DYuSSh Smena Kaluga

Senior career*
Years	Team	Apps	(Gls)
2004	FC Lokomotiv Kaluga	14	(3)
2005–2010	FC Lokomotiv Moscow	0	(0)
2007	→ FC Zvezda Irkutsk (loan)	18	(1)
2008	→ FC Rostov (loan)	17	(0)
2009	→ FC Vityaz Podolsk (loan)	9	(1)
2011	FC Vityaz Podolsk	1	(0)

International career
2008	Russia U21	1	(1)
- * Club domestic league appearances and goals

Nikita Olegovich Denisov (Russian: Никита Олегович Денисов; born 7 April 1986) is a former Russian professional football player.

== Club career ==
He made his debut for FC Lokomotiv Moscow on 12 November 2005 in a Russian Cup game against FC Metallurg-Kuzbass Novokuznetsk.

He played 3 seasons in the Russian Football National League for FC Zvezda Irkutsk, FC Rostov and FC Vityaz Podolsk.
