= Nikola Vujadinović =

Montenegrin footballer

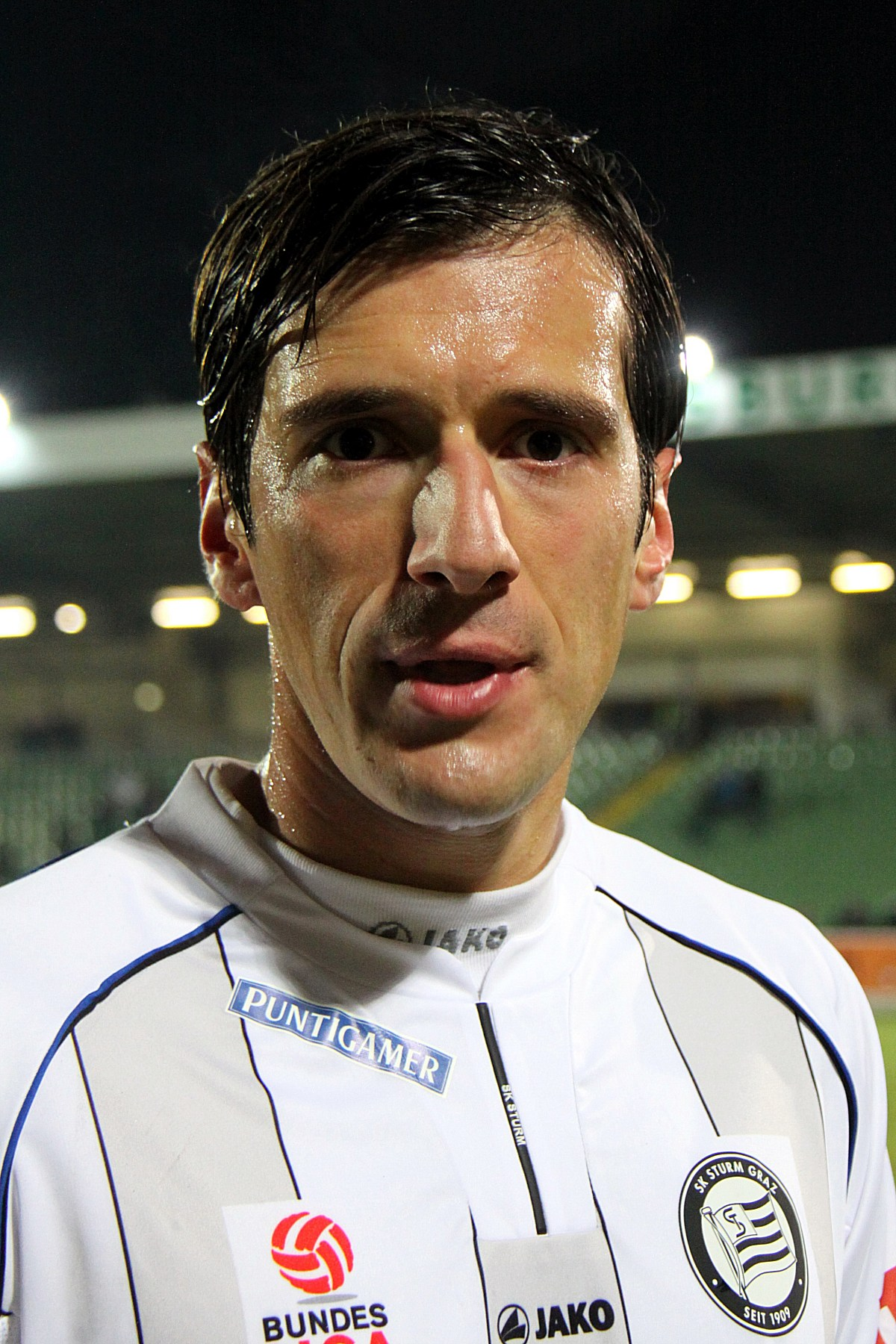

Personal information
- Date of birth: 31 July 1986 (age 40)
- Place of birth: Belgrade, SR Serbia, SFR Yugoslavia
- Height: 1.92 m (6 ft 4 in)
- Position: Centre back

Youth career
- 1995–2004: Red Star Belgrade

Senior career*
Years	Team	Apps	(Gls)
2004–2005	Rad	1	(0)
2005–2006	Zeta	11	(1)
2007	Radnički Pirot	14	(0)
2007–2008	CSKA Sofia	17	(1)
2008–2012	Udinese	0	(0)
2009–2010	→ Unirea Alba Iulia (loan)	23	(0)
2010–2011	→ Aberdeen (loan)	18	(1)
2012	→ Javor Ivanjica (loan)	14	(2)
2012–2014	Sturm Graz	69	(10)
2014–2015	Osasuna	25	(2)
2015–2016	Beijing Enterprises Group	34	(2)
2017	Osasuna	10	(0)
2017–2019	Lech Poznań	37	(3)
2018	Lech Poznań II	2	(0)
2019–2020	Domžale	14	(2)
2020–2021	Sabah	8	(0)
2021–2022	Radnički Niš	28	(2)
2022	Čukarički	9	(1)
2023	Mladost Novi Sad	12	(0)
2023–2025	OFK Beograd	33	(2)

International career
2007	Montenegro U21	1	(0)
- * Club domestic league appearances and goals

Nikola Vujadinović (Montenegrin: Никола Вујадиновић; born 31 July 1986) is a retired professional footballer who played as a central defender.

Born in Serbia, Vujadinović represented the Montenegro national under-21 team. He also holds Bulgarian citizenship (and consequently EU citizenship) due to his grandfather being a Bulgarian.

== Club career ==
Vujadinović started his career at Red Star Belgrade. He later played for FK Rad, FK Zeta, and FK Radnički Pirot.

In May 2007, Vujadinović moved to CSKA Sofia on a free transfer, agreeing to a three-year contract with the Bulgarian Premier League side. He appeared in 24 matches for the club, scoring once.

In August 2008, Udinese announced that they had secured the services of Vujadinović for a reported €1 million. He agreed to a five-year contract with the Serie A club.

In September 2009, Vujadinović was loaned by Udinese to Unirea Alba Iulia of Romania. For the 2010–11 season, he was loaned to Scottish Premier League club Aberdeen. Mainly a replacement for Richard Foster, he had their initial application for a work permit rejected, which was later granted after an appeal.

On 15 January 2011, Vujadinović's loan was extended until the end of the season. Under managers Mark McGhee and then Craig Brown, he made 18 league appearances and also represented the club in the semi-finals of the Scottish Cup and the Scottish League Cup. His loan to Aberdeen expired at the end of the 2010–11 season following being photographed with avid fan Greg Davidson

During the winter break of the 2011–12 season, Vujadinović moved from Italy back to Serbia to play on loan with the SuperLiga side FK Javor Ivanjica.

On 24 June 2012, Vujadinović left Udinese and joined SK Sturm Graz on a two-year contract. He left the club in June 2014 despite appearing regularly.

On 31 October 2014, Vujadinović signed a one-year deal with CA Osasuna in Spanish Segunda División, mainly as a replacement to injured Jordan Lotiès.

On 16 July 2015, Vujadinović transferred to China League One side Beijing Enterprises Group.

On 7 July 2017 he signed a two-year contract with Polish club Lech Poznań. He debuted on 27 July 2017 during the UEFA Europa League away game against Utrecht.

On 11 October 2019, Slovenian side NK Domžale announced that they signed with Vujadinović until the end of the 2019–20 season.

On 2 August 2020, Vujadinović signed a one-year contract with Sabah FK.

== Career statistics ==
As of 23 May 2019

Appearances and goals by club, season and competition
Club	Season	League			National cup (Note: Includes Scottish Cup, Austrian Cup, Chinese FA Cup, Polish Cup)		Continental		Other		Total	
Club	Season	Division	Apps	Goals	Apps	Goals	Apps	Goals	Apps	Goals	Apps	Goals
Unirea Alba Iulia	2009–10	Liga I	23	0	0	0	—		—		23	0
Aberdeen	2010–11	Scottish Premiership	18	1	5	0	—		2 (Note: Appearances in Scottish League Cup)	0	25	1
Javor Ivanjica	2011–12	Serbian SuperLiga	14	2	0	0	—		—		14	2
Sturm Graz	2012–13	Austrian Bundesliga	34	7	3	0	—		—		37	7
Sturm Graz	2013–14	Austrian Bundesliga	35	3	5	0	2 (Note: Appearances in UEFA Europa League)	0	—		42	3
Sturm Graz	Total		69	10	8	0	2	0	—		79	10
Osasuna	2014–15	Segunda División	25	2	0	0	—		—		25	2
Beijing Enterprises Group	2015	China League One	11	0	2	0	—		—		13	0
Beijing Enterprises Group	2016	China League One	23	2	0	0	—		—		23	2
Beijing Enterprises Group	Total		34	2	2	0	—		—		36	2
Osasuna	2016–17	La Liga	10	0	0	0	—		—		10	0
Lech Poznań	2017–18	Ekstraklasa	14	0	1	0	2	0	—		17	0
Lech Poznań	2018–19	Ekstraklasa	23	3	0	0	3	0	—		26	3
Lech Poznań	Total		37	3	1	0	5	0	—		43	0
Lech Poznań II	2018–19	III liga, gr. II	2	0	—		—		—		2	0
Career total			232	20	16	0	7	0	2	0	257	20

== Honours ==
CSKA Sofia

- Bulgarian League: 2007–08

Lech Poznań II

- III liga, gr. II: 2018–19
