= Dimitar Koemdzhiev =

Bulgarian footballer

Personal information
- Full name: Dimitar Atanasov Koemdzhiev
- Date of birth: 28 September 1978 (age 48)
- Place of birth: Satovcha, Bulgaria
- Height: 1.79 m (5 ft 10 1/2 in)
- Position: Defender

Senior career*
Years	Team	Apps	(Gls)
1998–2001	Pirin Blagoevgrad	39	(3)
2001–2002	Spartak Pleven	31	(1)
2002–2006	Marek Dupnitsa	87	(2)
2006–2009	Pirin Blagoevgrad	55	(0)
2009–2010	Vihren Sandanski	17	(0)
2011	Pirin Blagoevgrad	13	(0)
2011	Montana	11	(0)
2012	Septemvri Simitli	11	(0)
2016–2017	Brantford Galaxy		
2018	SC Real Mississauga		

International career
- Bulgaria U21
- * Club domestic league appearances and goals

Dimitar Koemdzhiev (Bulgarian: Димитър Коемджиев; born 28 September 1978) is a Bulgarian footballer.

== Playing career ==
Koemdzhiev began playing in 1999 in the Bulgarian A Football Group with Pirin Blagoevgrad. After the relegation of Pirin he signed with Spartak-Pleven in 2001. In 2002, he played with FC Marek Dupnitsa, and featured in the 2003 UEFA Intertoto Cup against Videoton FC. He returned to Blagoevgrad in 2006 to play in the Bulgarian B Football Group, and secured promotion within the same season. He later had stints with Vihren Sandanski, and a third term with Blagoevgrad in 2011.

In 2011, he played with FC Montana, and subsequently with FC Septemvri Simitli in 2012. In 2016, he played abroad in the Canadian Soccer League with Brantford Galaxy. After two seasons in Brantford he was traded to Real Mississauga SC in 2018.
