= Ivaylo Tsvetkov =

Bulgarian footballer

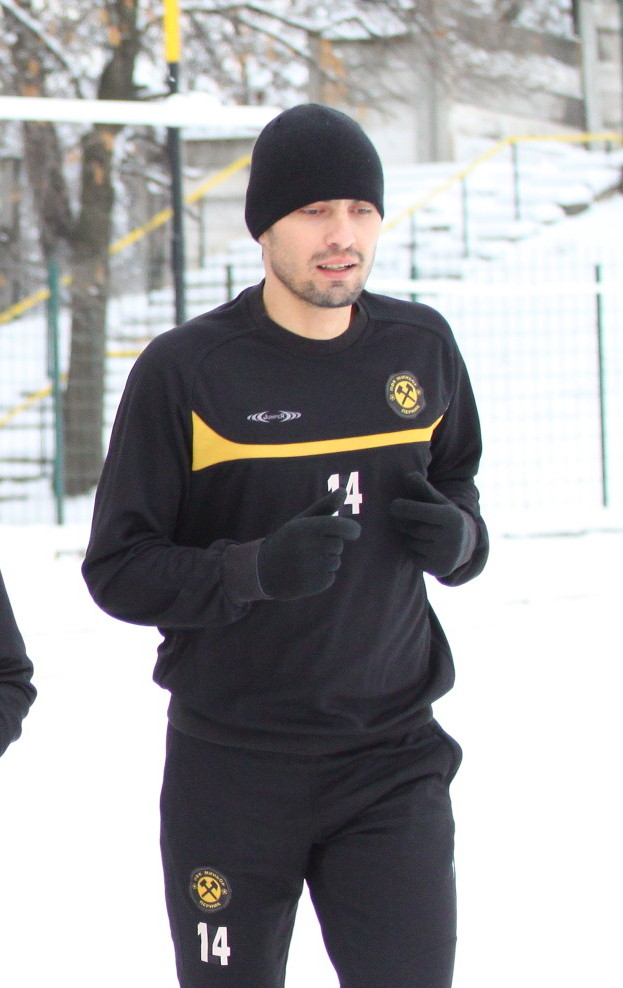

Personal information
- Full name: Ivaylo Danchov Tsvetkov
- Date of birth: 28 August 1979 (age 47)
- Place of birth: Samokov, Bulgaria
- Height: 1.86 m (6 ft 1 in)
- Position: Defensive midfielder

Senior career*
Years	Team	Apps	(Gls)
2000–2001	Lokomotiv 101		
2001–2003	Rilski Sportist	44	(2)
2003–2006	Lokomotiv Sofia	39	(0)
2007	Rilski Sportist	11	(1)
2007–2008	Vidima-Rakovski	13	(0)
2008–2013	Minyor Pernik	79	(4)
- * Club domestic league appearances and goals

Ivaylo Danchov Tsvetkov (Bulgarian: Ивайло Данчов Цветков; born 28 August 1979) is a Bulgarian former footballer who played as a midfielder.
