= Nenad Nastić =

Serbian footballer

Personal information
- Date of birth: 8 May 1981 (age 45)
- Place of birth: Srbobran, SFR Yugoslavia
- Height: 1.82 m (6 ft 0 in)
- Position: Defender

Senior career*
Years	Team	Apps	(Gls)
1999–2000	Elan Srbobran	8	(0)
2000–2002	Zvezdara	25	(0)
2002–2005	Železnik	66	(4)
2005–2007	Vojvodina	48	(4)
2008	CSKA Sofia	7	(0)
2009	Khimki	11	(0)
2010–2011	Jagodina	16	(0)
2012	Leotar	0	(0)
2013	Timok	0	(0)
2014	Modriča	2	(0)
2014–2015	Proleter Novi Sad	4	(0)
2015–2016	TSC Bačka Topola		
2016–2017	Elan Srbobran		
- * Club domestic league appearances and goals

Nenad Nastić (Serbian Cyrillic: Ненад Настић; born 8 May 1981) is a Serbian former footballer.

He started playing in a minor club, FK Elan Srbobran, before starting to play with Serbian top league clubs such as FK Zvezdara, FK Železnik and, his most notable years, with FK Vojvodina. He also had spells abroad with Bulgarian CSKA Sofia and Russian FC Khimki before returning to Serbia to play with FK Jagodina.

== Honours ==
CSKA Sofia

- Bulgarian League: 2007–08
