= Krum Lovkov =

Bulgarian footballer

Personal information
- Full name: Krum Angelov Lovkov
- Date of birth: 19 December 1988 (age 37)
- Place of birth: Satovcha, Bulgaria
- Height: 1.77 m (5 ft 10 in)
- Position: Midfielder

Team information
- Current team: Brestnik 1948
- Number: 6

Youth career
- 1998–2006: CSKA Sofia

Senior career*
Years	Team	Apps	(Gls)
2006–2009	CSKA Sofia	1	(0)
2007	→ Rilski Sportist (loan)	2	(0)
2008	→ Vihren Sandanski (loan)	0	(0)
2009–	Brestnik 1948	20	(0)
- * Club domestic league appearances and goals as of 17 July 2010

Krum Lovkov (Bulgarian: Крум Ловков) (born on 19 December 1988) is a Bulgarian footballer currently playing for Brestnik 1948. Lovkov is a defensive midfielder.

== 2006 and later years ==
On 2006 the youth academy midfielder Krum Lovkov agreed to the conditions of his first professional contract with CSKA Sofia which was to be effective for three years. He has also played for Rilski Sportist and Vihren Sandanski.
