= Marko Palavestrić =

Serbian footballer

Personal information
- Full name: Marko Palavestrić
- Date of birth: August 12, 1982 (age 44)
- Place of birth: Belgrade, SFR Yugoslavia

Senior career*
Years	Team	Apps	(Gls)
2001–2004	Red Star Belgrade	0	(0)
2001–2002	→ Jedinstvo Ub (loan)	23	(0)
2002–2004	→ Mladenovac (loan)		
2004–2005	Spartak Varna	12	(0)
2005–2006	Brașov		
2006–2007	Mladenovac		
- * Club domestic league appearances and goals

Marko Palavestrić (Serbian Cyrillic: Марко Палавестрић; born August 12, 1982) is a Serbian retired footballer.

He had previously played in FK Jedinstvo Ub and OFK Mladenovac as loaned Red Star Belgrade, but also in Bulgarian FC Spartak Varna and Romanian FC Brașov.
