= Florentin Petre =

Romanian footballer

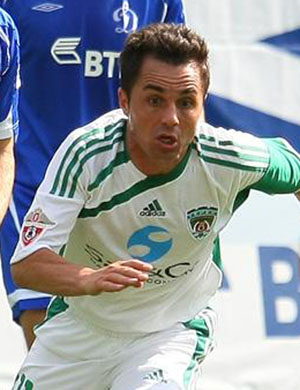
- Petre playing for Terek Grozny in 2009

Personal information
- Date of birth: 15 January 1976 (age 50)
- Place of birth: Bucharest, Romania
- Height: 1.67 m (5 ft 6 in)
- Position: Winger

Youth career
- –1988: Popești-Leordeni
- 1988–1990: Victoria București
- 1990–1994: Dinamo București

Senior career*
Years	Team	Apps	(Gls)
1994–2006	Dinamo București	259	(43)
1995	→ UTA Arad (loan)	9	(3)
2006–2008	CSKA Sofia	50	(21)
2008–2009	Terek Grozny	36	(5)
2010	CSKA Sofia	8	(1)
2010–2011	Victoria Brănești	10	(0)
Total		372	(73)

International career
1994–1998	Romania U21	19	(3)
1996	Romania Olympic	3	(1)
1998–2009	Romania	54	(6)

Managerial career
- 2015: Dinamo II București
- 2017–2018: Foresta Suceava
- 2018–2021: Dacia Unirea Brăila
- 2022: Ceahlăul Piatra Neamț
- 2023–2024: Unirea Ungheni
- * Club domestic league appearances and goals

Florentin Petre (born 15 January 1976) is a Romanian professional football manager and former player who was most recently the assistant coach of Ekstraklasa club Wieczysta Kraków.

== Club career ==
=== Youth career ===
Petre was born on 15 January 1976 in Bucharest, Romania. He grew up and began playing football in the town of Popești-Leordeni, then in 1988 he moved to the youth center of Victoria București. After the 1989 Romanian Revolution, Victoria was dissolved, and Petre was taken by coach Ionuț Chirilă to the youth center of Dinamo București.

=== Dinamo București and UTA Arad ===
Petre started his senior career at Dinamo, playing his first Divizia A match on 15 October 1994 under coach Ion Moldovan in a 2–0 victory over Universitatea Cluj where he opened the score in the third minute. He was loaned to UTA Arad in the second half of that season, playing eight league matches in which he scored one goal.

Subsequently, Petre came back to Dinamo, where over the years he would become the team's captain and won three Divizia A titles. The first championship was won in the 1999–2000 season, being used by coach Cornel Dinu in 22 league matches in which he scored seven goals. One of these goals was netted in a 3–2 derby win against Steaua București that mathematically secured the title. In 2000, Petre contracted hepatitis C, and in 2001, he had an accident while fishing in the Danube Delta when he touched an electricity wire with his fishing rod and almost lost his life. These events put him on the sideline for almost two seasons, but he still managed to help win the 2001–02 title by scoring one goal in 10 appearances under coaches Dinu and Marin Ion. His hepatitis problem also made Spanish club Alavés give up on his transfer even though he had a precontract signed with them. He won his third title with Dinamo in the 2003–04 season, playing 24 games and scoring four goals under coach Ioan Andone, including a hat-trick in a 7–3 win over FCM Bacău. His performances in 2004 earned him the fifth place in the Romanian Footballer of the Year award, tied with Tiberiu Ghioane.

During these years, Petre also helped the club win five Cupa României, playing in four of the finals. In 2005, he captained the team under coach Andone for the full 90 minutes in the 3–2 victory against rivals Steaua which helped the club earn its first Supercupa României. Petre also represented The Red Dogs in European competitions, playing 32 games in which he scored six goals (including three appearances with two goals in the Intertoto Cup). In the 2003–04 UEFA Cup, he helped the team get past Liepājas Metalurgs against whom he scored a double and Shakhtar Donetsk. In the 2005–06 edition of the same competition, they eliminated Everton with a historical 5–2 victory on aggregate in which he scored a goal, reaching the group stage.

=== CSKA Sofia ===
Petre left Dinamo in July 2006 and signed a three-year contract with Bulgarian club CSKA Sofia. In his first season spent in Bulgaria, Petre played alongside fellow Romanians Eugen Trică and Alexandru Pițurcă. His first performance was playing the entire match under coach Plamen Markov in the conquest of the 2006 Bulgarian Supercup, following a penalty shoot-out victory against rivals Levski Sofia in which Petre netted the final spot kick. He made his debut in the Bulgarian league on 5 August 2006 in a 2–0 away victory against Cherno More Varna. He scored his first goal in the competition on 9 September when he opened the score in a 3–1 away win over Rilski Sportist Samokov.

In the following season, Petre played 24 games and scored 11 goals under coach Stoycho Mladenov, helping CSKA win undefeated the 31st title in the club's history. With these goals, he was the team's second top-scorer, having two fewer than Nei, and in the last round he netted a hat-trick in the 3–0 win against Chernomorets Burgas.

=== Terek Grozny ===
In 2008, Petre joined compatriots Daniel Pancu and Andrei Mărgăritescu in Russia at Terek Grozny, which paid €300,000 for his transfer. He made his Russian Premier League debut on 13 July 2008 when coach Vyacheslav Hroznyi used him the entire match in a 0–0 draw against FC Moscow. He scored his first goal on 23 August in a 2–1 home win over Lokomotiv Moscow. On 9 November he netted a brace in a 3–1 away win over champions Rubin Kazan. In the next season, Petre scored two goals in victories against Dynamo Moscow and Tom Tomsk. He played a total of 36 matches and scored five goals in the Russian league.

=== Return to CSKA Sofia ===
In January 2010, Petre returned to CSKA Sofia for half a year, alongside Romanians Daniel Pancu and coach Ioan Andone. His only league goal scored during this second spell was in a 4–1 home victory against Sportist Svoge. In both periods spent with The Reds, Petre scored a total of 22 goals in 58 Bulgarian league matches and played eight matches with one goal in European competitions.

=== Victoria Brănești ===
In November 2010, Petre returned to Romania, signing with Victoria Brănești. He made his last Divizia A appearance on 21 May 2011 in a 2–0 victory against Gloria Bistrița, totaling 278 matches with 46 goals in the competition.

== International career ==
Between 1994 and 1998, Petre made several appearances for Romania's under-21 and under-23 teams. During his time with the under-21 side, he was part of the team that managed a first-ever qualification to a European Championship in 1998, which Romania subsequently hosted. In the final tournament that was composed of eight teams, coach Victor Pițurcă used him in all three games which were losses to Netherlands, Germany and Russia, as they finished in last place.

Petre played 54 matches and scored six goals for Romania, making his debut under coach Pițurcă on 19 August 1998 in a 0–0 friendly draw against Norway. He played eight games and scored one goal in a 2–1 victory against Greece in the successful Euro 2000 qualifiers. He was selected by Emerich Jenei to be part of the final tournament squad. In the group stage, Petre played only one game when he replaced Dan Petrescu in the 64th minute of the 1–0 loss to Portugal. In the quarter-finals he played the entire match in the 2–0 loss to Italy.

Petre played one game during the 2002 World Cup qualifiers and nine games in which he scored one goal in a 2–1 victory against Finland in the 2006 World Cup qualifiers. Subsequently, he played seven matches and scored once in a 2–0 victory against Luxembourg in the successful Euro 2008 qualifiers. He was used by coach Victor Pițurcă in two games in the eventual group stage exit in the final tournament. His first appearance was in a 1–1 draw against Italy, where he started and played until the 59th minute before being replaced by Bănel Nicoliță. In his second appearance, he replaced Nicoliță in the 82nd minute during the 2–0 loss to the Netherlands. Petre played one game and scored one goal in a 2–2 draw against France during the 2010 World Cup qualifiers. He made his last appearance for the national team in a friendly which ended with a 2–1 loss to Croatia.

On 25 March 2008, he was decorated by the president of Romania, Traian Băsescu, for his performance in the Euro 2008 qualifiers, where Romania managed to obtain the qualification to the final tournament. He received Medalia "Meritul Sportiv" – ("The Sportive Merit" Medal) class III.

== Managerial career ==
Petre started his managerial career in February 2012 as Marin Ion's assistant coach at Dinamo II București. In the second half of the 2012–13 Liga I season, he became Cornel Țălnar's assistant at Dinamo's first team. He had his first experience as head coach in 2015 at Dinamo II. He reunited with Țălnar in 2017, working as his assistant at Brașov and Luceafărul Oradea, after which he had a spell as head coach at Foresta Suceava. From August 2018 until December 2021, Petre coached Dacia Unirea Brăila, finishing with the team in the last place of the 2018–19 Liga II season, thus being relegated to Liga III. There, he managed to gain promotion back to the second league in the 2020–21 season. However, after the first half of the 2021–22 season in which the team finished last with only two points, he and the club ended their collaboration.

In January 2022, Petre was named coach at third league side Ceahlăul Piatra Neamț, but left the team in November. About one year later he went to coach in the third league at Unirea Ungheni where he earned a promotion to the second league at the end of the 2023–24 season. Shortly afterwards, he became the assistant coach of Željko Kopić at Dinamo. In August 2026, he joined Polish club Wieczysta Kraków's staff as an assistant under Kopić. He left the club on 7 November upon Kopić's sacking.

== Rallying ==
Petre was also passionate about motorsport, competing in the national rallying championships of Romania and Bulgaria. He became rally champion of Bulgaria in 2010 and competed in the 2012 rally championship of Romania, obtaining a third place at the end of one race.

== Personal life ==
Petre was ranked 84th in the 2006 nationwide poll of the 100 Greatest Romanians.

Petre's son, Patrick, is also a footballer who started his career at Dinamo București, currently playing for Liga II club FC Bacău.

== Career statistics ==
=== Club ===
Appearances and goals by club, season and competition
Club	Season	League			National cup (Note: Includes Cupa României, Bulgarian Cup, Russian Cup)		Europe		Other		Total	
Club	Season	Division	Apps	Goals	Apps	Goals	Apps	Goals	Apps	Goals	Apps	Goals
Dinamo București	1994–95	Divizia A	7	1	—		0	0	—		7	1
Dinamo București	1995–96	Divizia A	30	3	3	1	1 (Note: Appearances in UEFA Cup)	0	—		34	4
Dinamo București	1996–97	Divizia A	29	5	4	0	3 (Note: Appearances in UEFA Intertoto Cup)	2	—		36	7
Dinamo București	1997–98	Divizia A	29	8	3	1	2	0	—		34	9
Dinamo București	1998–99	Divizia A	29	8	6	3	—		—		35	11
Dinamo București	1999–00	Divizia A	22	7	6	2	4	1	—		32	10
Dinamo București	2000–01	Divizia A	4	0	0	0	2 (Note: Appearances in UEFA Champions League)	0	—		6	0
Dinamo București	2001–02	Divizia A	10	1	3	1	0	0	0	0	6	0
Dinamo București	2002–03	Divizia A	25	2	6	1	1	0	1 (Note: Appearance in Supercupa României)	0	33	3
Dinamo București	2003–04	Divizia A	24	4	3	0	5	2	1	0	33	6
Dinamo București	2004–05	Divizia A	24	2	7	1	6 (Note: Four appearances in UEFA Champions League, two appearances in UEFA Cup)	0	—		37	3
Dinamo București	2005–06	Divizia A	26	2	0	0	8	1	1	0	35	3
Dinamo București	Total		259	43	41	10	32	6	3	0	335	59
UTA Arad (loan)	1994–95	Divizia A	9	3	3	0	—		—		12	3
CSKA Sofia	2006–07	A Group	26	10	1	0	6	1	1 (Note: Appearance in Bulgarian Supercup)	0	34	11
CSKA Sofia	2007–08	A Group	24	11	1	0	2	0	–		27	11
CSKA Sofia	Total		50	21	2	0	8	1	1	0	61	2
Terek Grozny	2008	Russian Premier League	17	3	2	0	—		—		19	3
Terek Grozny	2009	Russian Premier League	19	2	1	0	—		—		20	2
Terek Grozny	Total		36	5	3	0	—		—		39	5
CSKA Sofia	2009–10	A Group	8	1	0	0	—		—		0	0
Victoria Brănești	2010–11	Liga I	10	0	—		—		—		14	0
Career total			372	73	49	10	40	7	4	0	465	90

=== International ===
Appearances and goals by national team and year
National team	Year	Apps	Goals
Romania	1998	5	0
Romania	1999	7	1
Romania	2000	9	1
Romania	2004	6	1
Romania	2005	8	1
Romania	2006	6	0
Romania	2007	6	1
Romania	2008	6	1
Romania	2009	1	0
Total		54	6

Scores and results list Romania's goal tally first, score column indicates score after each Petre goal.

List of international goals scored by Florentin Petre
No.	Date	Venue	Opponent	Score	Result	Competition
1	31 March 1999	Tofik Bakhramov Stadium, Baku, Azerbaijan	Azerbaijan	1–0	1–0	UEFA Euro 2000 qualifying
2	3 June 2000	Stadionul Steaua, Bucharest, Romania	Greece	2–0	2–1	Friendly
3	18 August 2004	Stadionul Valentin Stănescu, Bucharest, Romania	Finland	2–0	2–1	2006 FIFA World Cup qualification
4	16 November 2005	Stadionul Steaua, Bucharest, Romania	Nigeria	2–0	3–0	Friendly
5	17 October 2007	Stade Josy Barthel, Luxembourg, Luxembourg	Luxembourg	1–0	2–0	UEFA Euro 2008 qualifying
6	11 October 2008	Stadionul Farul, Constanța, Romania	France	1–0	2–2	2010 FIFA World Cup qualification

== Managerial statistics ==
As of 5 June 2024

Managerial record by team and tenure
Team	From	To	Record							
Team	From	To	G	W	D	L	GF	GA	GD	Win %
(Romania) Dinamo II București	17 June 2015	14 November 2015	10	2	3	5	13	16	−3	20.00
(Romania) Foresta Suceava	23 October 2017	30 June 2018	25	8	2	15	29	54	−25	32.00
(Romania) Dacia Unirea Brăila	27 August 2018	16 December 2021	98	26	13	59	130	232	−102	26.53
(Romania) Ceahlăul Piatra Neamț	17 January 2022	7 November 2022	25	15	6	4	48	18	+30	60.00
(Romania) Unirea Ungheni	23 October 2023	10 June 2024	22	12	5	5	39	21	+18	54.55
Total			180	63	29	88	259	341	−82	35.00

== Honours ==
Dinamo București

- Divizia A: 1999–2000, 2001–02, 2003–04
- Cupa României: 1999–2000, 2000–01, 2002–03, 2003–04, 2004–05
- Supercupa României: 2005

CSKA Sofia

- A Group: 2007–08
- Bulgarian Supercup: 2006

Individual

- Romanian Footballer of the Year (fifth place): 2004
