= Daniel Dyulgerov =

Bulgarian footballer

Personal information
- Date of birth: 19 September 1988 (age 38)
- Place of birth: Petrich, Bulgaria
- Height: 1.83 m (6 ft 0 in)
- Position: Midfielder

Team information
- Current team: Septemvri Simitli

Youth career
- Belasitsa Petrich

Senior career*
| Years | Team | Apps | (Gls) |
| 2006–2009 | Belasitsa Petrich | 45 | (1) |
| 2009–2011 | Septemvri Simitli | 13 | (1) |
| 2012 | Chernomorets Pomorie | 8 | (0) |
| 2013– | Septemvri Simitli | 11 | (1) |

International career
| 2007–2009 | Bulgaria U21 | ? | (?) |
- * Club domestic league appearances and goals as of 1 June 2013

Daniel Dyulgerov (Bulgarian: Даниел Дюлгеров; born 19 September 1988 in Petrich) is a Bulgarian footballer. He currently plays as a forward for Septemvri Simitli.

== Career ==
Born in Petrich Daniel Dyulgerov started to play football in local team Belasitsa.

=== 2006 ===
In 2006 the Youth Academy defender Daniel Dyulgerov agreed the conditions of his first professional contract with the club which was to be effective for four years.

=== 2007 ===
Dyulgerov has made his official debut for Belasitsa in Bulgarian first division in a match against Chernomorets Burgas on 12 August 2007 as a 61st-minute substitute. The result of the match was a 1:6 loss for the team from Petrich. During season 2007/2008 Daniel played in 21 matches for Belasitsa.

In October 2007 the Bulgarian national under-21 coach Aleksandar Stankov called up Dyulgerov for Bulgaria national under-21 football team for a match with Portugal U21. The result of the match was a 1:0 win for Bulgaria, but Daniel didn't play.
