= Quido Lanzaat =

Dutch footballer (born 1979)

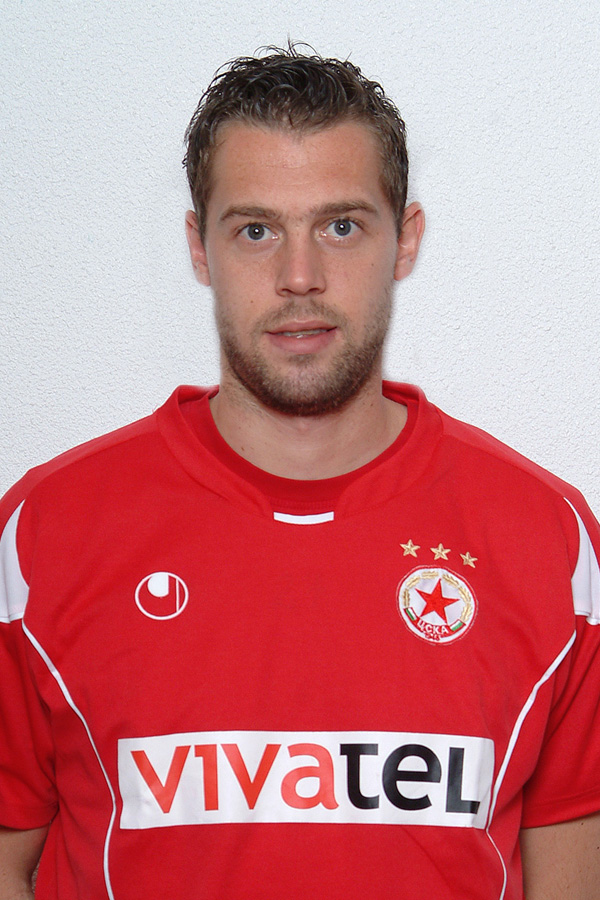

Personal information
- Full name: Quido Lanzaat
- Date of birth: 30 September 1979 (age 47)
- Place of birth: Amsterdam, Netherlands
- Height: 1.86 m (6 ft 1 in)
- Position: Defender

Youth career
- Ajax

Senior career*
| Years | Team | Apps | (Gls) |
| 1998–1999 | Ajax | 1 | (0) |
| 2000–2002 | Borussia Mönchengladbach | 11 | (0) |
| 2000–2002 | Borussia Mönchengladbach II | 35 | (4) |
| 2002–2004 | Alemannia Aachen | 47 | (4) |
| 2004–2006 | 1860 Munich | 30 | (0) |
| 2006–2007 | MSV Duisburg | 7 | (0) |
| 2007–2008 | CSKA Sofia | 8 | (0) |
| 2009–2010 | Carl Zeiss Jena | 21 | (0) |
| 2010–2012 | Wehen Wiesbaden | 57 | (2) |
| Total | | 217 | (10) |
- * Club domestic league appearances and goals

Quido Lanzaat (born 30 September 1979) is a Dutch former footballer who played as a defender.

== Career ==
A product of the Ajax football academy, Lanzaat played in the UEFA Cup and the UEFA Champions League with Ajax.

In early 2000, he moved to Germany to play for Borussia Mönchengladbach. In 2002, he transferred to Alemannia Aachen, with whom he reached the final of the DFB-Pokal in 2004. The same year he was signed by 1860 Munich. In the 2006–07 season he played for MSV Duisburg. In the summer of 2007, he moved to Bulgaria joining CSKA Sofia on a free transfer.

After being released at CSKA Sofia in 2008, Lanzaat went on trial with Aberdeen in the Scottish Premier League and was close to joining Coventry City in the Coca-Cola Championship after impressing on trial.

On 8 July 2009, he returned to Germany signing a contract with Carl Zeiss Jena. Having made just 26 appearances for the club, he agreed to terminate his contract with Jena on 25 June 2010.

On the same day of Lanzaat's release from Carl Zeiss Jena, Wehen Wiesbaden announced the signing of the player on a two-year contract.

== Personal life ==
On 11 July 2014, Lanzaat was declared missing. Five days later, he was reported as being alive.

== Honours ==
CSKA Sofia

- Bulgarian League: 2007–08
