= José Luis Garcés =

Panamanian footballer (born 1981)

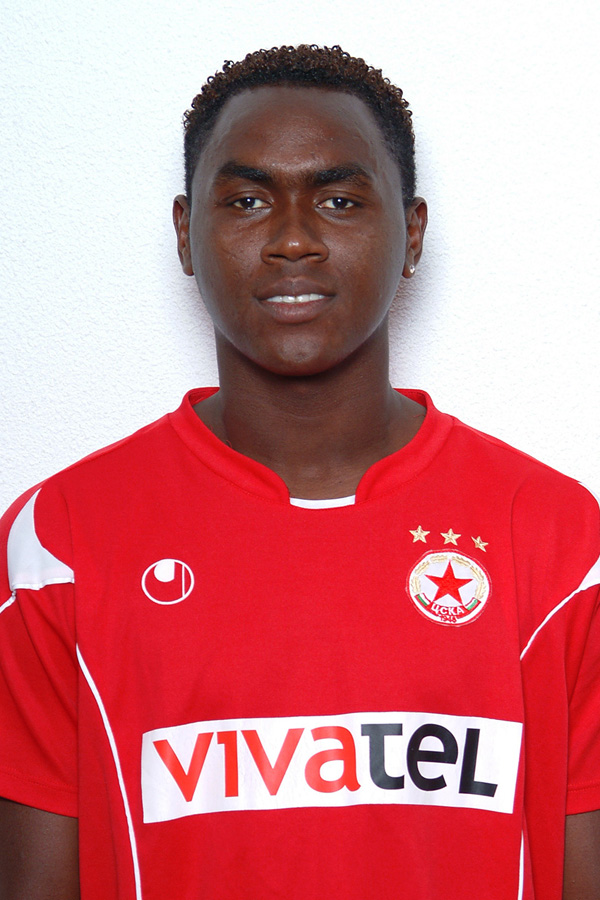

Personal information
- Full name: José Luis Garcés Rivera
- Date of birth: May 9, 1981 (age 45)
- Place of birth: La Chorrera, Panama
- Height: 1.81 m (5 ft 11 in)
- Position: Forward

Team information
- Current team: San Francisco

Youth career
- 1991–1998: Independiente La Chorrera

Senior career*
Years	Team	Apps	(Gls)
1999–2000	Independiente La Chorrera	25	(8)
2001	Sporting '89	12	(4)
2002–2003	Árabe Unido	29	(9)
2003–2005	San Francisco	67	(24)
2004	Grêmio	?	(?)
2005–2006	→ Nacional (loan)	15	(1)
2006–2007	→ Belenenses (loan)	12	(4)
2007–2008	CSKA Sofia	14	(3)
2008–2009	Académica	10	(1)
2009	→ Al-Ittifaq (loan)	1	(0)
2010	Árabe Unido	?	(?)
2011–2014	San Francisco	57	(12)
2014–2015	Tauro	24	(4)
2015–2016	Plaza Amador	18	(3)
2016	San Francisco	16	(3)
2016–2017	Sport West FC	?	(?)
2017	CA Independiente	?	(?)
2017	Azuero FC	?	(?)
2018–2019	Costa del Este	?	(?)
2020	Atlético Chiriquí	?	(?)
2020	San Francisco	?	(?)

International career
2000–2009	Panama	32	(9)
- * Club domestic league appearances and goals

José Luis Garcés Rivera (born 9 May 1981) is a Panamanian footballer who currently plays for Liga Panameña de Fútbol side San Francisco.

== Club career ==
At club level, Garcés plays in the striker position. Nicknamed el Pistolero, he played for clubs in Brazil, Uruguay, Bulgaria, and Portugal before he returned to Panama because he was not being paid in his club Académica de Coimbra.

=== Criminal charges ===
He later signed a loan deal with Arabian club Al-Ittifaq but later returned to Panama to play for Árabe Unido, where he got arrested a couple of times and in April 2011 spent time in jail. He was later released in July 2011 and signed with San Francisco, making his return to football during the CONCACAF Champions League match against Seattle Sounders FC.

In July 2012 Garcés was again sentenced to serve time in jail on appeal for the alleged assault in 2011 on a woman who subsequently lost her baby, but in November 2012 he was again released after spending 5 months in prison. In March 2013 he was reportedly targeted by armed men in Puerto Caimito but came out unharmed.

In June 2014, Garcés joined Tauro, who released him in June 2015. He subsequently moved to Plaza Amador.

== International career ==
Garcés made his international debut for the Panama national football team in 2000 in a match against Canada and has earned a total of 32 caps, scoring 9 goals. He represented his country in 10 FIFA World Cup qualifiers matches and played at the 2007 and 2009 CONCACAF Gold Cups.

His final international was a July 2009 CONCACAF Gold Cup match against the United States.

=== International goals ===
Scores and results list Panama's goal tally first.

#	Date	Venue	Opponent	Score	Result	Competition
1	27 June 2003	Estadio Rommel Fernández, Panama City, Panama	Cuba	2–0	2–0	Friendly
2	28 January 2004	Estadio Cuscatlán, San Salvador, El Salvador	El Salvador	1–0	1–1	Friendly
3	17 November 2004	Estadio Rommel Fernández, Panama City, Panama	El Salvador	3–0	3–0	2006 FIFA World Cup qualification
4	26 March 2007	National Stadium, Kingston, Jamaica	Jamaica	1–0	1–1	Friendly
5	8 June 2007	Giants Stadium, East Rutherford, United States	Honduras	3–1	3–2	2007 CONCACAF Gold Cup
6	10 June 2007	Giants Stadium, East Rutherford, United States	Cuba	1–0	2–2	2007 CONCACAF Gold Cup
7	1 June 2008	Lockhart Stadium, Fort Lauderdale, United States	Guatemala	1–0	1–0	Friendly
8	4 June 2008	Lockhart Stadium, Fort Lauderdale, United States	Canada	2–1	2–2	Friendly
9	22 June 2008	Estadio Cuscatlán, San Salvador, El Salvador	El Salvador	1–0	1–3	2010 FIFA World Cup qualification

== Honors ==
Nacional

- Uruguayan Primera División (1): 2005–06

CSKA Sofia

- Bulgarian A Professional Football Group (1): 2007–08

National team

- Gold Cup runner-Up (1): 2005
- UNCAF Nations Cup runner-Up (1): 2007
