= Zé Rui =

Portuguese footballer

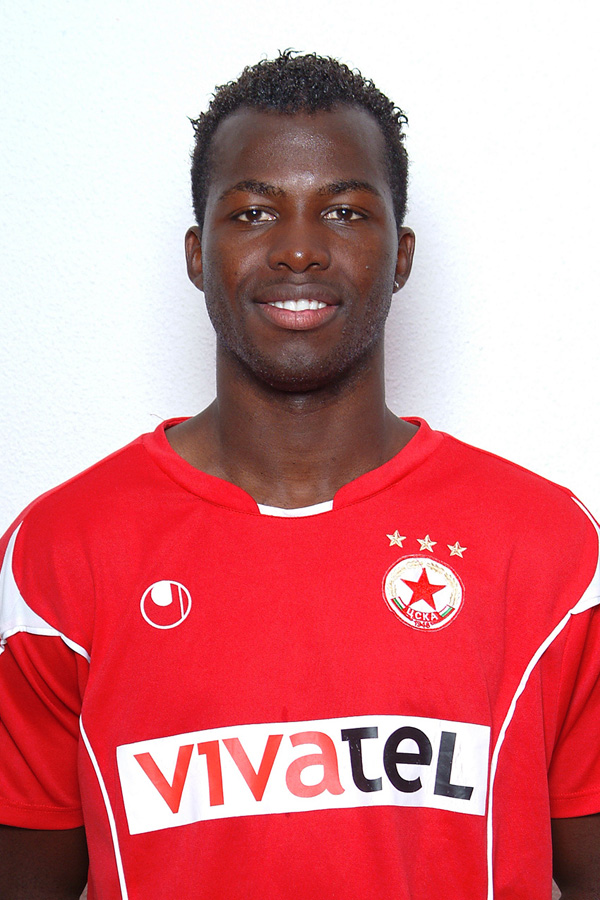

Personal information
- Full name: José Rui Tavares da Veiga
- Date of birth: 16 September 1982 (age 44)
- Place of birth: Póvoa de Santa Iria, Portugal
- Height: 1.81 m (5 ft 11 in)
- Position: Winger

Team information
- Current team: Paivense

Youth career
- 1996–2001: Alverca

Senior career*
Years	Team	Apps	(Gls)
2001–2002	Lourinhanense	10	(3)
2002–2004	Alverca	35	(2)
2004–2005	Vitória Setúbal	24	(3)
2005–2006	Penafiel	24	(1)
2006–2007	Nacional	7	(0)
2007–2009	CSKA Sofia	21	(1)
2009–2010	Gloria Bistriţa	17	(0)
2011–2012	Naval	19	(0)
2012–2014	Académico Viseu	61	(7)
2014–2016	Lusitano Vildemoinhos	49	(2)
2016–2018	Sátão		
2018–2019	Vila Silgueiros	22	(1)
2019–	Paivense	33	(1)

International career
2005	Cape Verde	4	(0)
- * Club domestic league appearances and goals as of 23 December 2018

José Rui Tavares da Veiga (born 16 September 1982), commonly known as Zé Rui, is a Cape Verdean professional footballer who plays for Paivense as a left winger.

== Honours ==
Vitória Setúbal

- Taça de Portugal: 2004–05

CSKA Sofia

- First Professional Football League (Bulgaria): 2007–08
