= Petar Trifonov (footballer) =

Bulgarian footballer

Personal information
- Full name: Petar Georgiev Trifonov
- Date of birth: 14 March 1984 (age 42)
- Place of birth: Pleven city,Pleven, Bulgaria
- Height: 1.85 m (6 ft 1 in)
- Position: Defender

Senior career*
Years	Team	Apps	(Gls)
- FC Iztrebitel
2007–2010	Belasitsa Petrich	41	(2)
2011	Dunav Ruse		
2011	Bdin VIdin	13	(0)
2012	Svetkavitsa	12	(1)
- * Club domestic league appearances and goals as of 30 June 2012

Petar Trifonov (Bulgarian: Петър Трифонов: born 14 March 1984, in Pleven) is a Bulgarian footballer who last played as a defender for Svetkavitsa.
