= Evgeni Yordanov (footballer) =

Bulgarian footballer

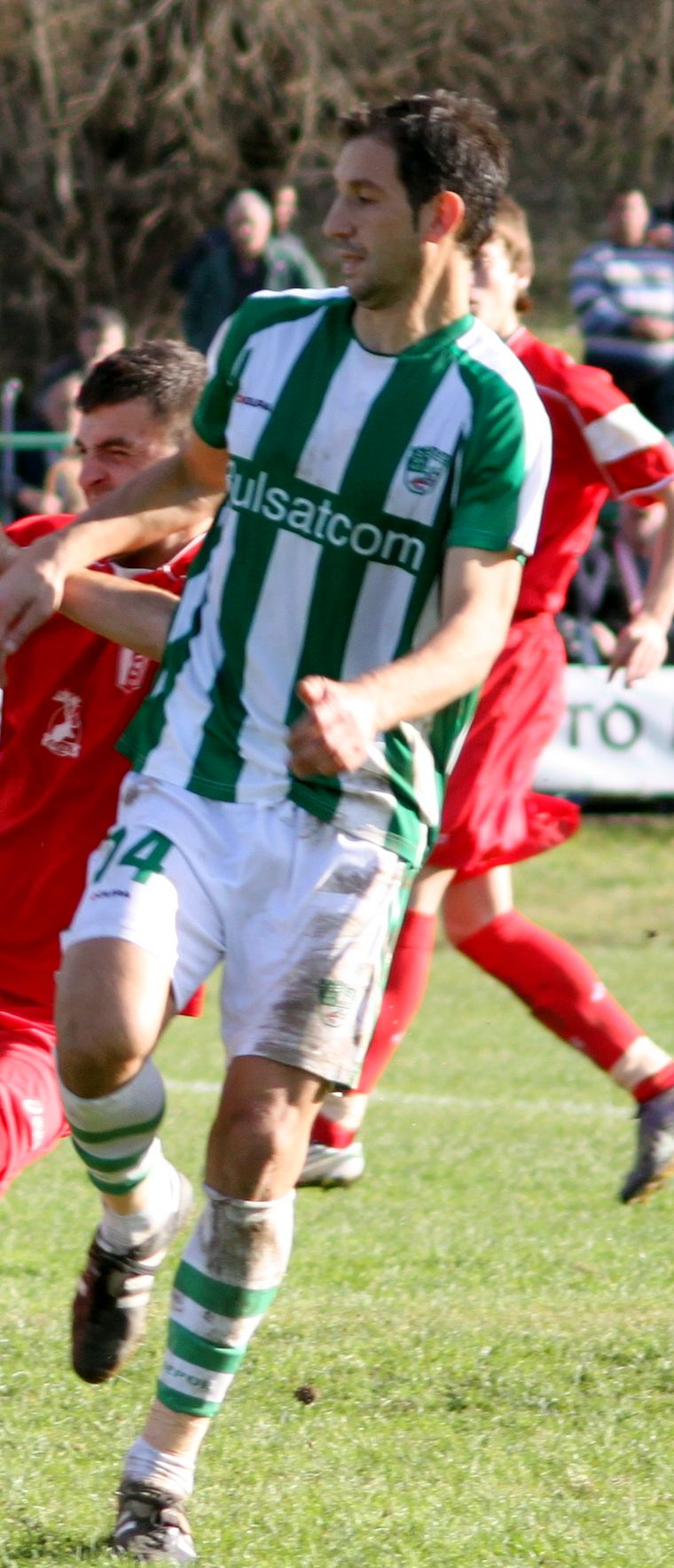

Personal information
- Full name: Evgeni Stanoykov Yordanov
- Date of birth: 4 February 1978 (age 48)
- Place of birth: Kyustendil, Bulgaria
- Height: 1.88 m (6 ft 2 in)
- Position: Forward

Youth career
- Velbazhd Kyustendil

Senior career*
Years	Team	Apps	(Gls)
1996–2001	Velbazhd Kyustendil	24	(2)
1998	→ Vihar (loan)		
1999	→ Spartak Varna (loan)	6	(0)
2001–2002	Pirin Blagoevgrad	18	(4)
2002–2003	Makedonska Slava	27	(18)
2003–2005	CSKA Sofia	49	(16)
2005–2007	Amkar Perm	9	(0)
2007	→ CSKA Sofia (loan)	13	(4)
2007	Marek Dupnitsa	10	(1)
2008–2009	CSKA Sofia	21	(3)
2009–2010	Vihren Sandanski	14	(9)
2010–2011	Beroe Stara Zagora	32	(4)
- * Club domestic league appearances and goals

Evgeni Yordanov (Bulgarian: Евгени Йорданов; born 4 February 1978) is a Bulgarian former professional footballer who played as a forward.

== Honours ==
CSKA Sofia

- A Group: 2004–05, 2007–08
- Bulgarian Supercup: 2008
