= Stoyan Abrashev =

Bulgarian footballer (born 1988)

Personal information
- Full name: Stoyan Abrashev
- Date of birth: 12 January 1988 (age 38)
- Place of birth: Bulgaria
- Height: 1.76 m (5 ft 9 1/2 in)
- Position: Midfielder

Team information
- Current team: FC Sportist Svoge
- Number: 11

Senior career*
Years	Team	Apps	(Gls)
2005–2006	CSKA Sofia		
2006	Marek		
2006–2007	Dunav		
2007	Minyor Pernik		
2007–2008	CSKA Sofia		
2008–2009	Sportist Svoge		
2009–2010	Kaliakra		
2010–2011	Sportist Svoge		
- * Club domestic league appearances and goals as of July 2009 ‡ National team caps and goals as of December 2009

Stoyan Abrashev (Bulgarian: Стоян Абрашев; born 12 January 1988) is a retired Bulgarian footballer. Before his retirement on January 18, 2011, Abrashev played for FC Sportist Svoge as a left wing midfielder. In 2009 he tried to play for Lokomotiv Plovdiv. He began his professional career with PFC CSKA Sofia, where he was part of the squad that won the Bulgarian Cup in 2006 and the Bulgarian league title in 2008, but he made a limited number of on field appearances. In April 2025, he was arrested by Bulgarian authorities for operating a large-scale marijuana cultivation and processing.
