= Ivaylo Petrov (footballer, born 1973) =

Bulgarian footballer

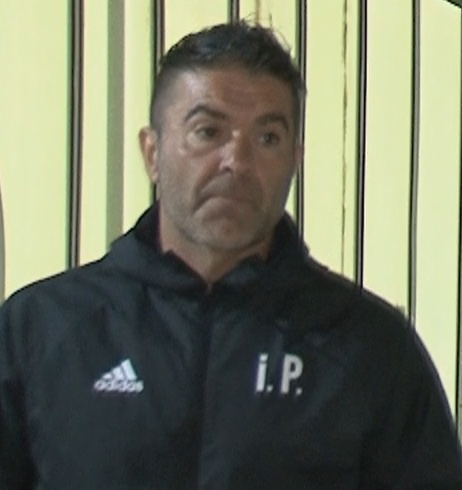

Personal information
- Full name: Ivaylo Petrov Ivanov
- Date of birth: 3 May 1973 (age 53)
- Place of birth: Sofia, Bulgaria
- Height: 1.82 m (6 ft 0 in)
- Position: Goalkeeper

Youth career
- 1985–1991: Levski Sofia

Senior career*
Years	Team	Apps	(Gls)
1992–1998	Olimpik Teteven	0	(0)
1998–1999	Akademik Svishtov	10	(0)
1999–2000	Beroe Stara Zagora	13	(0)
2001–2006	Cherno More	70	(0)
2006–2008	CSKA Sofia	58	(1)
2008–2009	AEK Larnaca	4	(0)
2009–2010	CSKA Sofia	15	(0)

Managerial career
- 2015: Minyor Pernik (goalkeeping coach)
- 2015–2016: CSKA Sofia (goalkeeping coach)
- 2016–2017: Neftochimic (goalkeeping coach)
- 2018–2020: CSKA Sofia (goalkeeping coach)
- 2021: CSKA Sofia (goalkeeping coach)
- * Club domestic league appearances and goals

Ivaylo Petrov Ivanov is a Bulgarian former professional footballer who played as a goalkeeper.

== Honours ==
CSKA Sofia

- Bulgarian League: 2007–08
- Bulgarian Supercup: 2006
