= Nei (footballer, born 1980) =

Brazilian footballer

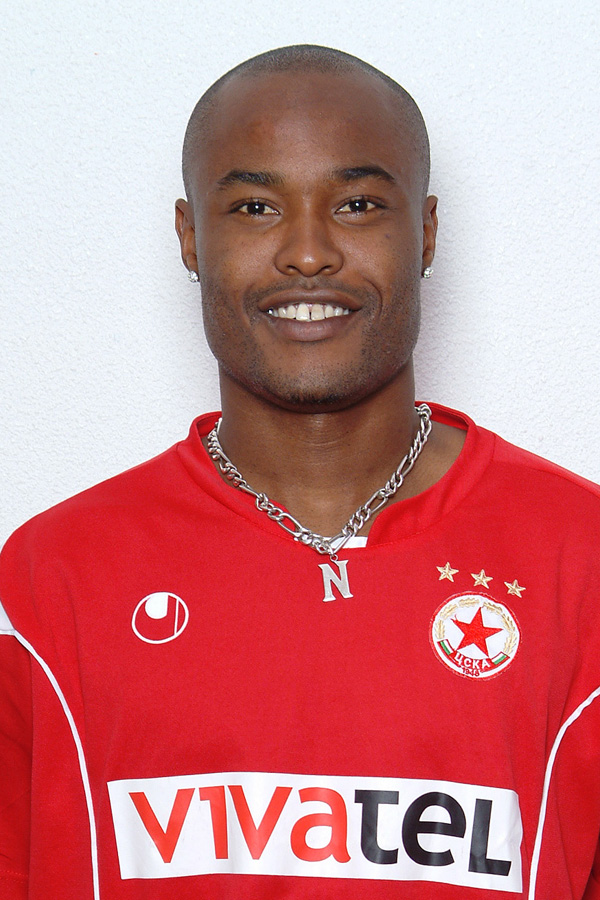

Personal information
- Full name: Claudinei Alexandre Aparecido
- Date of birth: 2 May 1980 (age 46)
- Place of birth: Avaré, Brazil
- Height: 1.87 m (6 ft 2 in)
- Position: Striker

Senior career*
| Years | Team | Apps | (Gls) |
| 2000–2001 | Guarani | | |
| 2001–2004 | Ovarense | 88 | (22) |
| 2005–2006 | Moreirense | 42 | (15) |
| 2006–2007 | Naval | 28 | (6) |
| 2007–2008 | CSKA Sofia | 28 | (14) |
| 2008–2009 | Al-Shabab | 9 | (4) |
| 2009–2010 | → CFR Cluj (loan) | 20 | (5) |
| 2010–2011 | Changchun Yatai | 40 | (11) |
| 2012 | Chongqing Lifan | 11 | (4) |
| 2013 | Grémio Anápolis | 12 | (6) |
| 2013 | → Boa (loan) | 1 | (0) |
| 2013 | Chongqing | 13 | (10) |
| 2014–2015 | Tianjin Songjiang | 28 | (11) |
| 2016 | Trindade | 4 | (0) |
Medal record
CFR Cluj
| Winner | Romanian Cup | 2010 |
- * Club domestic league appearances and goals as of 28 May 2017

Claudinei Alexandre Aparecido (born 2 May 1980 in Avaré, São Paulo), known as Nei, is a Brazilian former professional footballer who last played for Trindade Atlético Clube as a striker.

== Football career ==
After solid performances in Portugal for A.D. Ovarense in the second division (he arrived in the country at the age of 21 from Guarani Futebol Clube), Nei moved in the January 2005 transfer window to Moreirense F.C. in the Primeira Liga, making his debut on the 9th in a 1–0 home win against Académica de Coimbra and scoring four goals in the season's last three games – including one in a 1–1 home draw against FC Porto – as his team eventually suffered relegation.

Nei played one more year in Portugal in 2006–07, with Associação Naval 1º de Maio, his ten league goals being good enough for joint-fifth in the scorers' list, as the Figueira da Foz team finished 11th and retained their top level status. He then moved to Bulgaria with PFC CSKA Sofia, for €500.000: in his only season he netted a career-best 14 goals, also helping the side to the First Professional Football League championship.

Nei signed a two-year deal with Al-Shabab FC (Riyadh) of Saudi Arabia, being loaned to CFR Cluj in Romania in his second year and being a relatively important attacking unit as the team won the double. In July 2010, he was sold to Changchun Yatai F.C. from China.

On 11 January 2014, after having represented four clubs in quick succession, Nei returned to the Asian country, transferring to China League One's Tianjin Songjiang FC.

== Honours ==
CSKA Sofia

- Bulgarian League: 2007–08
- Bulgarian Supercup: 2008

CFR Cluj

- Liga I: 2009–10
- Cupa României: 2009–10
