= Aleksandar Tunchev =

Bulgarian former footballer (born 1981)

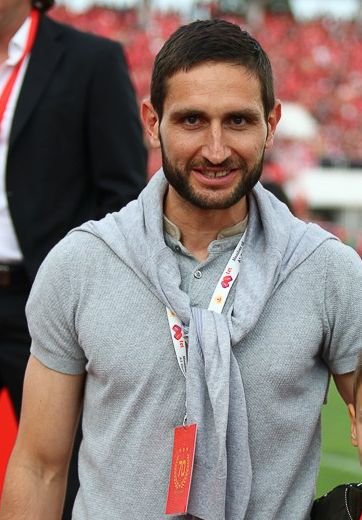
- Tunchev in 2018

Personal information
- Full name: Aleksandar Blagov Tunchev
- Date of birth: 10 July 1981 (age 45)
- Place of birth: Pazardzhik, Bulgaria
- Height: 1.88 m (6 ft 2 in)
- Position: Centre-back

Team information
- Current team: Arda Kardzhali (manager)

Youth career
- Hebar Pazardzhik

Senior career*
Years	Team	Apps	(Gls)
1998–2001	Hebar Pazardzhik	38	(5)
2000	→ Iskar Sofia (loan)	15	(1)
2001–2002	Belasitsa Petrich	30	(3)
2002–2005	Lokomotiv Plovdiv	65	(4)
2006–2008	CSKA Sofia	63	(11)
2008–2012	Leicester City	26	(1)
2011	→ Crystal Palace (loan)	9	(0)
2012–2013	Zagłębie Lubin	19	(1)
2013–2014	Lokomotiv Plovdiv	29	(1)
2014–2015	CSKA Sofia	28	(4)
2015–2017	Lokomotiv Plovdiv	31	(0)
Total		353	(31)

International career
2004–2009	Bulgaria	26	(1)

Managerial career
- 2016–2020: Lokomotiv Plovdiv (assistant)
- 2020–2022: Lokomotiv Plovdiv
- 2022–2024: Arda Kardzhali
- 2024–: Arda Kardzhali
- * Club domestic league appearances and goals

Aleksandar Blagov Tunchev (Bulgarian: Александър Тунчев; born 10 July 1981) is a Bulgarian professional football manager and former player who played as a centre-back. He is currently in charge of Arda Kardzhali.

== Club career ==
=== Bulgaria ===
Tunchev started his career in his hometown of Pazardzhik with local team Hebar. After that he played for Belasitsa Petrich, later joining Lokomotiv Plovdiv in June 2002. With Lokomotiv they became Champions of Bulgaria in 2004 and also won the Bulgarian Super Cup that same year. In 2006, he signed for CSKA Sofia. In 2007, he was appointed captain after Valentin Iliev was stripped of the CSKA captaincy. They were crowned champions in 2008, and also won the Bulgarian Cup and Supercup in 2006. In June 2008, CSKA was in a deep financial crisis and were forced to sell their key players, including Tunchev.

=== Leicester City ===
==== 2008–09 season ====
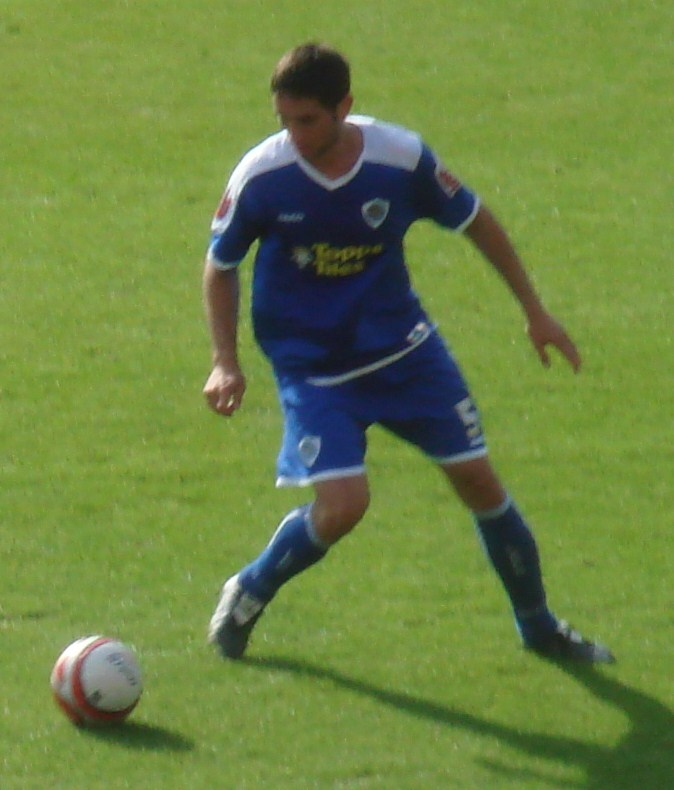
Tunchev playing for Leicester City in September 2008

Tunchev joined Leicester City on 5 July 2008 for a fee of £375,000, signing a three-year contract. He made his debut in a 2–0 home win over MK Dons on 9 August 2008, scoring his first league goal in a 2–2 home draw against Walsall on 21 October. Tunchev was peerless as he guided the club's defence through the first half of the 2008–09 season, losing just two league games.

==== Knee injury ====
His season was cut short when he suffered a partial tear of his anterior cruciate ligament in his right knee during a 2–1 FA Cup replay defeat to Crystal Palace on 14 January 2009. It was Tunchev's "first big injury", his previous being a pulled hamstring. Nonetheless, he was awarded a medal after Leicester finished the season as League One champions, winning promotion to the Championship.

On 20 July 2009, Tunchev was back in full training after recovering from injury. He played his first game a day later as a substitute in a pre-season friendly against Mansfield Town. He made his first competitive appearance in a 2–1 League Cup defeat to Preston North End on 25 August. However, he suffered an injury to his left knee in a 2–1 defeat to Preston on 26 September. Tunchev had managed two league games before undergoing another operation on his right knee on 30 September. Restricted to crutches ever since, he returned to the training ground in early October for his rehabilitation. It was thought that Tunchev could return to training in November. Then-manager Nigel Pearson however, refused to rush him back into the first team, instead wanting him to be "absolutely spot on" before returning. Suffering several setbacks during rehabilitation, Tunchev flew to Barcelona, Spain in early February 2010 to see the specialist who originally treated his injury problem. He returned to England after undergoing the last of a series of injections to his knee in the hope of avoiding another operation. On 4 February 2010, Pearson said it was unlikely Tunchev would play again in the 2009–10 season. He was ruled out for six months after undergoing another knee operation on 2 March 2010.

==== Return to fitness ====
Tunchev made his return against San Jose Earthquakes in a behind-closed-doors friendly on 24 February 2011 at Belvoir Drive. He played for 65 minutes before being substituted. He finally played his first competitive game since September 2009 in a 4–2 win over Watford on 25 April 2011, albeit as a substitute during stoppage time. On 7 May 2011, Tunchev came on as a 30th-minute substitute in a 4–2 win over Ipswich Town, the final game of the 2010–11 season as Leicester finished in 10th place. By this time, he had played only five games in two seasons as a result of his two knee injuries.

==== Loan to Crystal Palace ====
After a successful pre-season with Leicester City, on 5 August 2011 Tunchev signed a one-year contract extension which was set to expire in 2012 and was sent originally on a month's loan to Crystal Palace, though this was later extended to a 3-month loan. Tunchev made 10 appearances in total in his brief stint at Palace.

==== Return to Leicester ====
Tunchev returned to Leicester after his loan spell at Crystal Palace had come to an end, with Nigel Pearson, who originally brought him to England having returned to manage the Foxes. After a couple of months of trying to prove his fitness following a further groin injury, Pearson recalled Tunchev to the first team on 2 January 2012 to face the Crystal Palace side he had been on loan with earlier in the season. Leicester won the game 2–1. Tunchev was released by the club on 19 May 2012 after failing to do enough to earn an extension to his contract.

=== Zagłębie Lubin ===
In the summer of 2012, Tunchev was also on trial with Ludogorets Razgrad, catching the eye of then manager Ivaylo Petev, but the Razgrad team eventually decided against offering him a contract. In September 2012, Tunchev joined Polish Ekstraklasa side Zagłębie Lubin as defensive cover, following injuries to other players. He signed for an initial one-year period, with the option of a second year.

=== Return to Bulgaria ===
==== Loko Plovdiv ====
In June 2013, Tunchev once again became part of the Loko Plovdiv team.

==== CSKA Sofia ====
In May 2014, Tunchev rejoined CSKA Sofia for a period of one year, becoming the team's first summer signing.

==== Loko Plovdiv ====
In June 2016, Tunchev announced his retirement but was restored as a player by Lokomotiv Plovdiv's manager Eduard Eranosyan in February 2017. He finally retired in June 2017.

== International career ==
Tunchev used to be part of the Bulgaria national side. He made his debut in a 3–1 win over Turkey on 18 August 2005, playing for six minutes. The defender was a regular for the Bulgarian team since making his official debut against Romania in a UEFA Euro 2008 qualifying match. On 11 October 2006, Tunchev scored his first international goal in a 1–0 away win over Luxembourg during a UEFA Euro 2008 qualifying match. In November 2014, he was recalled to the national side for a Euro 2016 qualifier against Malta after a long absence from international duty, but remained on the bench.

== Career statistics ==
#	Date	Location	Opponent	Score	Result	Competition
1	11 October 2006	Luxembourg City, Luxembourg	Luxembourg	1–0	1–0	UEFA Euro 2008 qualifying

== Honours ==
=== Player ===
Lokomotiv Plovdiv

- A Group: 2003–04
- Bulgarian Supercup: 2004

CSKA Sofia

- A Group: 2007–08
- Bulgarian Cup: 2005–06
- Bulgarian Supercup: 2006

Leicester City

- Football League One: 2008–09

=== Manager ===
Lokomotiv Plovdiv

- A Group runner-up: 2020–21
