= Abderrahman Kabous =

Moroccan footballer (born 1983)

Personal information
- Full name: Abderrahman Kabous
- Date of birth: April 24, 1983 (age 43)
- Place of birth: Meaux, France
- Height: 1.85 m (6 ft 1 in)
- Position: Midfielder

Team information
- Current team: MC Oujda

Youth career
- 1996–2002: RC Lens

Senior career*
Years	Team	Apps	(Gls)
2003–2004	FC Sochaux-Montbéliard	8	(0)
2004–2005	Ittihad Khemisset	19	(2)
2005	IFK Norrköping	23	(1)
2006	Degerfors IF	7	(0)
2007–2008	CSKA Sofia	21	(1)
2008–2009	Real Murcia	12	(0)
2010	Silkeborg IF	0	(0)
2011–2012	Wydad Casablanca	9	(3)
2012–2013	Luzenac AP	16	(1)
2013–2015	Khaitan SC		
2015–2016	MC Oujda		

International career^{‡}
2007–2009	Morocco	9	(0)
- * Club domestic league appearances and goals as of November 26, 2011 ‡ National team caps and goals as of March 30, 2010

Abderrahman Kabous (Arabic: عبد الرحمن قابوس; born 24 April 1983) is a former footballer who played as a midfielder. Born in France, he represented Morocco at the international level.

== Career ==
Murcia acquired Kabous from the Bulgarian club PFC CSKA Sofia on 31 January 2008. He has previously also played in Morocco, France and Sweden. In October 2009, he became a free agent, having been released by the Spanish club Real Murcia. On 30 March 2010, the Danish Superliga side Silkeborg IF signed the midfielder on a free transfer.

== International career ==
Born in Meaux, France, Kabous holds Moroccan and French nationalities and represents Morocco internationally. He received his first call-up to Morocco's senior side in 2007.
