= Robert Petrov =

Macedonian footballer (born 1978)

Personal information
- Full name: Robert Petrov; Роберт Петров
- Date of birth: 2 June 1978 (age 48)
- Place of birth: Sveti Nikole, SFR Yugoslavia
- Height: 5 ft 11 in (1.80 m)
- Position: Left back

Youth career
- Ovče Pole

Senior career*
Years	Team	Apps	(Gls)
1997–1999	FK Ergelija		
1999–2002	Pobeda	52	(1)
2002–2006	Lokomotiv Plovdiv	81	(2)
2006–2008	CSKA Sofia	26	(1)
2008	Panserraikos	1	(0)
2009–2010	Slavia Sofia	31	(0)
2010–2012	AZAL Baku	55	(1)
2013–2014	Conegliano German		
2015	Spartak Pleven	5	(0)
2016	Bdin Vidin	7	(0)
2017	Lokomotiv Plovdiv	2	(0)
2017	Chepinets Velingrad	14	(2)
2018–2019	Germanea	0	(0)

International career
2000–2011	Macedonia	31	(0)

Managerial career
- 2015–2016: Spartak Pleven
- 2016: Bdin Vidin (player-manager)
- * Club domestic league appearances and goals

Robert Petrov (Macedonian: Роберт Петров; born 2 June 1978) is a Macedonian footballer who last played as a defender for Germanea Sapareva Banya.

== Club career ==
Robert Petrov began his career in the Macedonian club FK Ovče Pole. In 1999, he signed a contract with FK Pobeda, with whom he won the 2002 Macedonian Football Cup. In June 2002 he signed for Bulgarian club Lokomotiv Plovdiv, who were the Bulgarian champions in 2004. In 2006 Petrov transferred to CSKA Sofia for a fee of €150,000. During the 2006/07 season, he earned 28 appearances playing in the A PFG, scored one goal and won Bulgarian Supercup. In next season Petrov do not plays football for sake bruise.

After spending six years of his career in Bulgaria, Robert Petrov relocated to Greece in June 2008, signing a contract with Panserraikos. After only six months in the Greek club he returned in Bulgaria and on 19 February signed with Slavia Sofia.

=== Club statistics (incomplete) ===
As of 4 December 2012

Club performance			League		Cup		Continental		Total	
Season	Club	League	Apps	Goals	Apps	Goals	Apps	Goals	Apps	Goals
Azerbaijan			League		Azerbaijan Cup		Europe		Total	
2010–11	AZAL	Azerbaijan Premier League	31	1	4	0	—		35	1
2011–12	AZAL	Azerbaijan Premier League	24	0	3	0	2	0	29	0
Total	Azerbaijan		55	1	7	0	2	0	64	1
Career total			55	1	7	0	2	0	64	1

== International career ==
He made his senior debut for Macedonia in a February 2000 friendly match against FR Yugoslavia and has earned a total of 31 caps, scoring no goals. His final international was an October 2011 European Championship qualification match against Slovakia.

== Awards ==
- Macedonian Football Cup 2002 (with FK Pobeda)
- Champion of Bulgaria 2004 (with Lokomotiv Plovdiv)
- Bulgarian Supercup 2006 (with CSKA Sofia)
