= Yordan Yurukov =

Bulgarian footballer

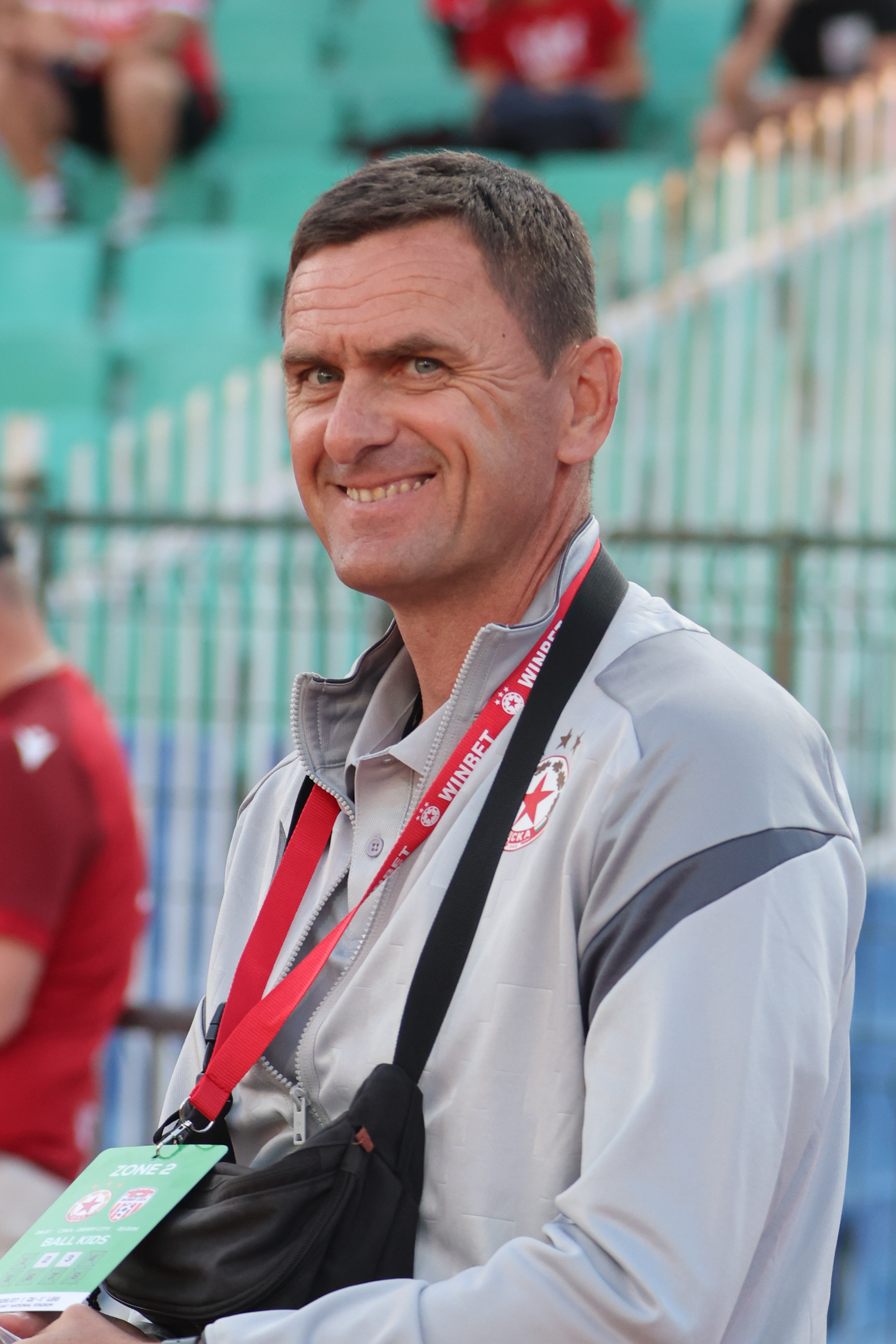

Personal information
- Full name: Yordan Ivanov Yurukov
- Date of birth: 2 October 1983 (age 43)
- Place of birth: Razlog, Bulgaria
- Height: 1.81 m (5 ft 11 in)
- Position: Midfielder

Youth career
- 1990–1996: Pirin Razlog
- 1996–2002: Lokomotiv 101

Senior career*
Years	Team	Apps	(Gls)
2002–2004	Pirin 1922	26	(9)
2005–2008	CSKA Sofia	52	(7)
2008–2010	Cherno More	52	(15)
2011–2012	Slavia Sofia	26	(2)
2012	Minyor Pernik	11	(1)
2013	Lokomotiv Plovdiv	5	(1)
2014–2016	Pirin Razlog	45	(6)
2016	Bansko	2	(0)
Total		219	(41)

International career
- Bulgaria U21

Managerial career
- 2016–2018: CSKA 1948 (assistant)
- 2018–2019: Ludogorets Razgrad U17
- 2019–2020: CSKA 1948
- 2020: CSKA 1948 (assistant)
- 2020: CSKA 1948
- 2026–: CSKA Sofia III
- * Club domestic league appearances and goals

Yordan Ivanov Yurukov (Bulgarian: Йордан Юруков; born 2 October 1983) is a Bulgarian former professional footballer who played as a midfielder.

== Club career ==
=== Pirin and CSKA ===
Born in Razlog, Yurukov started his professional career at Pirin 1922. On 13 November 2004, he scored three goals against Dorostol Silistra in a match from Bulgarian second division.

In January 2005, Dancho signed with CSKA Sofia. On 23 August 2005, he assisted Valentin Iliev who headed in a goal to secure a prestigious 1:0 away win for CSKA Sofia against Liverpool F.C. in a Champions League qualifying match. Whilst at the club, his team became the champion of the Bulgarian A Professional Football Group in the 2005 and 2008 seasons. With CSKA he won the Bulgarian Cup in 2006.

=== Cherno More ===
In June 2008, Yurukov was transferred to Cherno More Varna. He has been given the No. 77 shirt.

Yurukov made his official debut for the Sailors in the match against UE Sant Julià in the UEFA Cup on 17 July 2008. The result of the match was a 4:0 win for Cherno More. On 31 July 2008 he scored his first goals for Cherno More in the second leg against UE Sant Julià on Estadi Communal in Aixovall. The two goals were scored in the 22nd and 39th minute. The result of the match was a 5:0 win for Cherno More. On 2 October 2008, on his birthday, Dancho scored the opening goal in the UEFA Cup match against the German powerhouse VfB Stuttgart, but the match ended in a 2:2 draw and the sailors were eliminated after an aggregate score of 3:4. On 20 October 2008 Yordan scored two goals against Lokomotiv Mezdra in a match from the Bulgarian A PFG. On 16 May 2009, Yurukov scored the winning goal for Cherno More to help the team from Varna secure a 1:0 win against his former club CSKA Sofia. In his first season in Cherno More, Yurukov earned 29 appearances the A PFG and scored eleven goals. In the Bulgarian Cup, he played one match, and in the UEFA Cup, he played 6 matches and scored three goals.

In the first round of the 2009–10 season Yurukov received a heavy injury in the match against Chernomorets Burgas. He was diagnosed with damaged torn knee ligaments and because of that he missed the first part of the season. On 28 March 2010, he played his first game after returning from the long-term injury in the 0:1 away loss to Minyor Pernik.

On 23 October 2010, Yurukov made his 50th appearance for the team in A PFG in a 0–4 loss against Montana.

== International career ==
Yurukov was capped for the Bulgaria U21.

== Coaching career ==
=== CSKA 1948 ===
In August 2016, Yurukov was invited by Valentin Iliev, the manager of the newly formed CSKA 1948. His contract with Bansko was cancelled and he joined CSKA 1948 as assistant manager. Until leaving the team on 22 September 2020, Yurukov served at different times as head coach and assistant at the club.

== Playing statistics ==
Appearances and goals by club, season and competition
Club	Season	League		Cup		Europe		Total	
Club	Season	Apps	Goals	Apps	Goals	Apps	Goals	Apps	Goals
Pirin 1922	2003–04	13	4	0	0	0	0	13	4
Pirin 1922	2004–05	13	5	3	4	0	0	16	9
CSKA Sofia	2004–05	10	0	3	0	0	0	13	0
CSKA Sofia	2005–06	21	3	4	0	8	0	33	3
CSKA Sofia	2006–07	13	3	3	1	3	0	19	4
CSKA Sofia	2007–08	8	1	0	0	0	0	8	1
Cherno More	2008–09	29	11	1	0	6	2	36	13
Cherno More	2009–10	10	2	1	0	4	0	15	2
Cherno More	2010–11	13	2	0	0	0	0	13	2
Slavia Sofia	2010–11	6	0	0	0	0	0	6	0

== Honours ==
- Champion of Bulgaria – 2 times 2005, 2008 (with CSKA Sofia)
- Bulgarian Cup 2006 (with CSKA Sofia)
