= List of Bulgarian football transfers summer 2009 =

This is a list of Bulgarian football transfers in the summer transfer window of 2009, sorted by club. Only transfers of the A PFG clubs are listed.

== Levski Sofia ==
In: Note: Flags indicate national team as defined under FIFA eligibility rules; some limited exceptions apply. Players may hold more than one non-FIFA nationality.

No.	Pos.	Nation	Player
11	DF	BUL	Elin Topuzakov (free-agent)
16	MF	BUL	Mariyan Ognyanov (loan return from Belasitsa)
17	FW	NGA	Deniran Ortega (on loan from Slavia Sofia)
27	MF	FRA	Cédric Bardon (from Anorthosis Famagusta)
70	MF	SRB	Saša Simonović (from Loko Mezdra)

Out: Note: Flags indicate national team as defined under FIFA eligibility rules; some limited exceptions apply. Players may hold more than one non-FIFA nationality.

No.	Pos.	Nation	Player
4	MF	BUL	Georgi Chakarov (on loan to Sportist)
9	FW	BUL	Georgi Ivanov (was not indexed because of an injury)
17	MF	BUL	Georgi Nedyalkov (on loan to Sportist)
18	MF	BUL	Miroslav Ivanov (to Montana)
19	FW	BUL	Ivan Tsachev (on loan to Pirin)
23	DF	CZE	David Bystroň (on loan to FC Viktoria Plzeň)
26	DF	BUL	Martin Dimov (on loan to Sportist)
29	FW	BUL	Ismail Isa (on loan to Lokomotiv Mezdra)
34	DF	BUL	Dimitar Dimitrov (on loan to Spartak Plovdiv)
52	DF	BUL	Stefan Stanchev (on loan to Pirin)
70	MF	POR	Filipe da Costa (to C.D. Nacional)
—	MF	BUL	Dzuneit Yashar (to Slavia)
—	MF	BUL	Ivo Mikhailov (to Chavdar Etropole)
—	DF	BUL	Todor Stoev (to Chavdar Etropole)

== CSKA Sofia ==
In: Note: Flags indicate national team as defined under FIFA eligibility rules; some limited exceptions apply. Players may hold more than one non-FIFA nationality.

No.	Pos.	Nation	Player
1	GK	BUL	Zdravko Chavdarov (from Sliven)
4	DF	BUL	Kostadin Stoyanov (from Sliven)
8	MF	BUL	Todor Timonov (from Botev Plovdiv)
11	FW	BUL	Orlin Orlinov (from Slavia)
14	MF	BUL	Svetoslav Petrov (Free)
19	DF	BUL	Apostol Popov (from Botev Plovdiv)
20	MF	BUL	Nikolay Manchev (from Botev Plovdiv)
21	MF	BUL	Kosta Yanev (from Sliven)
22	FW	BRA	Michel Platini (from Chernomorets)
24	DF	PAR	Hugo Báez (from Sportivo Iteño)
26	MF	PAR	Jonathan Gómez (from Sportivo Trinidense)
73	FW	BUL	Ivan Stoyanov (from Sliven)
77	FW	BUL	Spas Delev (on loan from Pirin)

Out: Note: Flags indicate national team as defined under FIFA eligibility rules; some limited exceptions apply. Players may hold more than one non-FIFA nationality.

No.	Pos.	Nation	Player
1	GK	BUL	Ventsislav Velinov (to Botev Plovdiv)
2	DF	BUL	Pavel Kovachev (to Beroe)
8	FW	BUL	Martin Toshev (to Chernomorets)
10	MF	BUL	Nikolay Chipev (on loan to Sportist)
11	FW	BUL	Zdravko Lazarov (to Cherno More)
18	MF	BUL	Aleksandar Sabev (on loan to Sportist)
21	MF	NGA	Shikoze Udoji (to Asteras Tripolis)
22	DF	BRA	Eli Marques (to Cherno More)
24	MF	BUL	Aleksandar Tonev (on loan to Sliven)
84	DF	BRA	Filipe Machado (to Salernitana)
99	FW	BUL	Dormushali Saidhodzha (on loan to Litex)
--	FW	ARG	Germán Pietrobon (to Sportist)

== Cherno More Varna ==
In: Note: Flags indicate national team as defined under FIFA eligibility rules; some limited exceptions apply. Players may hold more than one non-FIFA nationality.

No.	Pos.	Nation	Player
3	DF	BRA	Ademar Junior (from ABC)
11	FW	BUL	Zdravko Lazarov (from CSKA Sofia)
17	MF	BUL	Martin Kerchev (from Slavia)
19	FW	BUL	Gerasim Zakov (from Lokomotiv Plovdiv)
28	DF	BRA	Eli Marques (from CSKA Sofia)

Out: Note: Flags indicate national team as defined under FIFA eligibility rules; some limited exceptions apply. Players may hold more than one non-FIFA nationality.

No.	Pos.	Nation	Player
2	DF	LVA	Stanislavs Pihockis (to FK Riga)
3	DF	URU	Sebastián Flores (to Botev Plovdiv)
16	FW	BUL	Teodor Atanasov (released)
--	FW	BUL	Georgi Andonov (to Beroe)

== Litex Lovech ==
In: Note: Flags indicate national team as defined under FIFA eligibility rules; some limited exceptions apply. Players may hold more than one non-FIFA nationality.

No.	Pos.	Nation	Player
7	MF	BUL	Hristo Yanev (from Grenoble Foot 38)
9	FW	BUL	Svetoslav Todorov (from Charlton Athletic F.C.)
23	MF	SRB	Nebojša Jelenković (from Spartak Trnava)
24	FW	BRA	Adriano Miranda (loan return from Spartak Varna)
33	DF	BUL	Nikolay Bodurov (from Pirin)
99	FW	BUL	Dormushali Saidhodzha (on loan from CSKA Sofia)

Out: Note: Flags indicate national team as defined under FIFA eligibility rules; some limited exceptions apply. Players may hold more than one non-FIFA nationality.

No.	Pos.	Nation	Player
7	FW	BUL	Strahil Popov (on loan to Lokomotiv Mezdra)
16	DF	BUL	Stanislav Manolev (to PSV)
18	FW	BUL	Krum Bibishkov (to Steaua)

== Lokomotiv Sofia ==
In: Note: Flags indicate national team as defined under FIFA eligibility rules; some limited exceptions apply. Players may hold more than one non-FIFA nationality.

No.	Pos.	Nation	Player
2	DF	BUL	Ilian Garov (from Botev Plovdiv)
9	FW	GHA	Derek Asamoah (from Hamilton Academical)
21	GK	BUL	Yulian Levashki (from Lokomotiv Mezdra)
31	DF	SRB	Zvonimir Stanković (from FK Renova)

Out: Note: Flags indicate national team as defined under FIFA eligibility rules; some limited exceptions apply. Players may hold more than one non-FIFA nationality.

No.	Pos.	Nation	Player
1	GK	SRB	Igor Bondžulić (to Javor)
16	MF	BUL	Hristo Koilov (retired)
20	DF	GNB	Adelino Lopes (contract expired)

== Lokomotiv Plovdiv ==
In: Note: Flags indicate national team as defined under FIFA eligibility rules; some limited exceptions apply. Players may hold more than one non-FIFA nationality.

No.	Pos.	Nation	Player
3	DF	BRA	Thiago Soares (from Treviso)
9	FW	BUL	Georgi Bozhilov (on loan from Chernomorets)
15	MF	BRA	Rafael Sciani (from Foligno Calcio)
17	MF	SVN	Dejan Komljenović (from Kastoria)
18	MF	BUL	Krasen Trifonov (from Spartak Plovdiv)
21	FW	BUL	Emil Stoev (from Spartak Plovdiv)

Out: Note: Flags indicate national team as defined under FIFA eligibility rules; some limited exceptions apply. Players may hold more than one non-FIFA nationality.

No.	Pos.	Nation	Player
9	FW	SRB	Pavle Delibašić (contract expired)
18	FW	BUL	Iskren Pisarov (on loan to Beroe)

== Chernomorets Burgas ==
In: Note: Flags indicate national team as defined under FIFA eligibility rules; some limited exceptions apply. Players may hold more than one non-FIFA nationality.

No.	Pos.	Nation	Player
4	DF	TUN	Enis Hajri (from VfR Mannheim)
7	MF	CPV	Nilton Fernandes (from NK Maribor)
13	FW	BUL	Martin Toshev (from CSKA Sofia)
17	FW	BUL	Georgi Chilikov (from FC Tobol)
18	DF	GER	Jochen Seitz (from Alemannia Aachen)
20	MF	VEN	Héctor Gonzalez (from AEK Larnaca)
21	FW	GER	Matthias Morys (from Kickers Offenbach)

Out: Note: Flags indicate national team as defined under FIFA eligibility rules; some limited exceptions apply. Players may hold more than one non-FIFA nationality.

No.	Pos.	Nation	Player
7	MF	BUL	Stefan Traykov (retired)
13	DF	BUL	Nikolay Nikolov (to Montana)
15	MF	MKD	Vančo Trajanov (contract expired)
23	FW	BRA	Michel Platini (to CSKA Sofia)

== Lokomotiv Mezdra ==
In: Note: Flags indicate national team as defined under FIFA eligibility rules; some limited exceptions apply. Players may hold more than one non-FIFA nationality.

No.	Pos.	Nation	Player
8	MF	BUL	Viktor Sofroniev (from Belasitsa)
10	FW	BUL	Tzvetomir Matev (from Svilengrad)
11	FW	BUL	Borislav Hazurov (from Pirin)
12	GK	BUL	Hristo Ivanov (from Vidima-Rakovski)
14	DF	BUL	Zdravko Stankov (from Botev Plovdiv)
15	DF	BUL	Martin Dechev (from CSKA Sofia)
16	MF	BUL	Dimitar Petkov (on loan from CSKA Sofia)
19	FW	BUL	Ismail Isa (on loan from Levski)
22	MF	BRA	Daniel Morales (from Spartak Varna)
27	FW	BRA	Marco Tulio (from Ethnikos Piraeus)
33	GK	BUL	Yordan Linkov (free-agent)
77	MF	BUL	Strahil Popov (on loan from Litex)

Out: Note: Flags indicate national team as defined under FIFA eligibility rules; some limited exceptions apply. Players may hold more than one non-FIFA nationality.

No.	Pos.	Nation	Player
2	DF	POL	Damian Rączka (released)
3	DF	POR	Hugo Simoes (released)
8	MF	BUL	Radoslav Anev (to Pirin)
9	FW	POR	Tozé Marreco (to Servette)
10	MF	POR	Nuno Fonseca (released)
15	MF	SRB	Saša Simonović (to Levski)
18	MF	GRE	Aristeidis Lottas (released)
19	FW	BUL	Atanas Nikolov (to Minyor)
20	DF	BUL	Filip Filipov (to Sliven)
21	GK	BUL	Yulian Levashki (to Loko Sofia)
25	DF	BUL	Tihomir Trifonov (to Montana)

== Slavia Sofia ==
In: Note: Flags indicate national team as defined under FIFA eligibility rules; some limited exceptions apply. Players may hold more than one non-FIFA nationality.

No.	Pos.	Nation	Player
4	MF	BUL	Nikolay Petrov (loan return from Spartak Varna)
8	DF	BUL	Borislav Georgiev (from Levadiakos)
9	FW	BUL	Todor Kolev (loan return from Kiryat Shmona)
11	DF	FRA	Steeve Reinette (from Astra Ploiești)
14	DF	BUL	Stoyan Georgiev (loan return from Spartak Varna)
17	MF	BUL	Dzuneit Yashar (from Levski Sofia)
19	FW	BRA	Jose Junior (from Duque de Caxias)
24	MF	ESP	Didi González (from Atlético Madrid B)
29	MF	POL	Tomasz Sajdak (from Alki Larnaca)
55	MF	BUL	Nikolay Dyulgerov (loan return from Minyor)

Out: Note: Flags indicate national team as defined under FIFA eligibility rules; some limited exceptions apply. Players may hold more than one non-FIFA nationality.

No.	Pos.	Nation	Player
2	DF	BUL	Vladimir Ivanov (retired)
11	FW	NGA	Deniran Ortega (on loan to Levski)
14	DF	NGA	Victor Deniran (to Sportist)
17	MF	BUL	Martin Kerchev (to Cherno More)
18	DF	SVN	Mitja Mörec (to Panetolikos)
22	MF	BRA	Antônio Carlos Heleno (released)
44	MF	SRB	Bratislav Ristić (to FK Rad)

== Pirin Blagoevgrad ==
In: Note: Flags indicate national team as defined under FIFA eligibility rules; some limited exceptions apply. Players may hold more than one non-FIFA nationality.

No.	Pos.	Nation	Player
2	DF	BUL	Georgi Samokishev (from Slavia)
5	DF	BUL	Stefan Stanchev (on loan from Levski)
7	FW	MKD	Zoran Zlatkovski (from Vihren)
9	FW	BUL	Ivan Tsachev (on loan from Levski)
11	MF	BUL	Radoslav Anev (from Loko Mezdra)
23	DF	BUL	Dian Moldovanov (from Dorostol 2003)

Out: Note: Flags indicate national team as defined under FIFA eligibility rules; some limited exceptions apply. Players may hold more than one non-FIFA nationality.

No.	Pos.	Nation	Player
4	DF	BUL	Nikolay Bodurov (to Litex)
7	FW	BUL	Spas Delev (on loan to CSKA Sofia)
9	FW	BUL	Borislav Hazurov (to Loko Mezdra)
14	MF	BUL	Lyubomir Vitanov (to Minyor)

== Minyor Pernik ==
In: Note: Flags indicate national team as defined under FIFA eligibility rules; some limited exceptions apply. Players may hold more than one non-FIFA nationality.

No.	Pos.	Nation	Player
11	FW	BUL	Anton Evtimov (from Strumska slava)
17	FW	BUL	Atanas Nikolov (from Lokomotiv Mezdra)
24	MF	BUL	Lyubomir Vitanov (from Pirin Blagoevgrad)
28	MF	SRB	Velimir Ivanović (from Spartak Varna)
88	FW	BUL	Kiril Mihaylov (from Birkirkara)

Out: Note: Flags indicate national team as defined under FIFA eligibility rules; some limited exceptions apply. Players may hold more than one non-FIFA nationality.

No.	Pos.	Nation	Player
6	MF	BUL	Nikolay Dyulgerov (end of loan)
39	FW	BUL	Borislav Dichev (released)

== OFC Sliven 2000 ==
In: Note: Flags indicate national team as defined under FIFA eligibility rules; some limited exceptions apply. Players may hold more than one non-FIFA nationality.

No.	Pos.	Nation	Player
2	DF	BUL	Borislav Stoychev (from Naftex)
11	MF	BUL	Atanas Apostolov (from Beroe)
12	GK	BUL	Ivan Georgiev (from Chavdar Etropole)
14	FW	BUL	Deyan Hristov (from Naftex)
15	MF	BUL	Aleksandar Tonev (on loan from CSKA Sofia)
16	DF	BUL	Martin Kovachev (from Naftex)
19	MF	BUL	Evgeni Ignatov (from Chavdar Etropole)
24	DF	BUL	Filip Filipov (from Loko Mezdra)

Out: Note: Flags indicate national team as defined under FIFA eligibility rules; some limited exceptions apply. Players may hold more than one non-FIFA nationality.

No.	Pos.	Nation	Player
2	DF	BUL	Kostadin Stoyanov (to CSKA Sofia)
10	FW	BUL	Ivan Stoyanov (to CSKA Sofia)
12	GK	BUL	Zdravko Chavdarov (to CSKA Sofia)
23	MF	BUL	Kosta Yanev (to CSKA Sofia)

== Botev Plovdiv ==
In: Note: Flags indicate national team as defined under FIFA eligibility rules; some limited exceptions apply. Players may hold more than one non-FIFA nationality.

No.	Pos.	Nation	Player
3	DF	ITA	Ciro Sirignano (from Sambenedettese)
5	DF	CMR	Gustave Bahoken (from Bradford)
6	DF	ITA	Marco D'Argenio (from A.C.D. Torgiano)
9	MF	BUL	Hristo Stalev (from Svilengrad)
10	MF	ITA	Emanuele Morini (from Sambenedettese)
11	FW	ITA	Alan Carlet (from Torres)
15	MF	ITA	Gilberto Zanoletti (from Cremonese)
17	DF	ITA	Fabio Tinazzi (from Sambenedettese)
18	MF	BUL	Boris Blagoev (from Brestnik 1948)
21	FW	ITA	Alberto Rebecca (from Venezia)
22	GK	BUL	Ventsislav Velinov (from CSKA Sofia)
23	MF	ITA	Massimiliano Brizzi (from Novara Calcio)
24	DF	URU	Sebastián Flores (from Cherno More)
25	DF	NGA	Daniel Ola (from A.C. Cesena)
28	DF	BUL	Anton Vergilov (from Marek)
69	GK	ITA	Luca Brignoli (from Ravenna Calcio)
99	FW	HON	Luis López (from Alacranes de Durango)

Out: Note: Flags indicate national team as defined under FIFA eligibility rules; some limited exceptions apply. Players may hold more than one non-FIFA nationality.

No.	Pos.	Nation	Player
3	DF	BUL	Daniel Bozhkov (to Widzew Łódź)
8	MF	BUL	Todor Timonov (to CSKA Sofia)
11	FW	BUL	Georgi Andonov (end of loan)
14	DF	BUL	Nikolay Harizanov (to Sportist)
15	DF	BUL	Apostol Popov (to CSKA Sofia)
18	MF	BUL	Georgi Avramov (to Spartak Plovdiv)
20	MF	BUL	Nikolay Manchev (to CSKA Sofia)
21	MF	CMR	Alfred Mapoka (to FC Pinggau/Friedberg)
23	DF	BUL	Zdravko Stankov (to Lokomotiv Mezdra)
24	DF	BUL	Ilian Garov (to Lokomotiv Sofia)
36	GK	BUL	Lilcho Arsov (retired)
99	FW	BUL	Georgi Semerdzhiev (to Sportist)

== PFC Montana ==
In: Note: Flags indicate national team as defined under FIFA eligibility rules; some limited exceptions apply. Players may hold more than one non-FIFA nationality.

No.	Pos.	Nation	Player
1	GK	BUL	Tsvetomir Tsankov (from Spartak Varna)
3	MF	BRA	Júlio César (from Kocaelispor)
5	DF	BUL	Nikolay Nikolov (from Chernomorets)
6	DF	BUL	Tihomir Trifonov (from Lokomotiv Mezdra)
11	FW	BUL	Atanas Chipilov (on loan from Dinamo Kyiv)
16	MF	BUL	Veselin Michev (from Vidima-Rakovski)
19	MF	BRA	Beto (from Slavia)
20	MF	BUL	Miroslav Ivanov (from Levski Sofia)

Out: Note: Flags indicate national team as defined under FIFA eligibility rules; some limited exceptions apply. Players may hold more than one non-FIFA nationality.

No.	Pos.	Nation	Player
—	DF	BUL	Vladimir Arnaudov (to Botev Krivodol)

== Beroe Stara Zagora ==
In: Note: Flags indicate national team as defined under FIFA eligibility rules; some limited exceptions apply. Players may hold more than one non-FIFA nationality.

No.	Pos.	Nation	Player
17	FW	BUL	Iskren Pisarov (on loan from Lokomotiv Plovdiv)
19	MF	SRB	Igor Tasković (from Marek)
22	GK	BUL	Boyan Peykov (from Minyor Radnevo)
27	MF	SRB	Dragan Nikolić (from A.D. Camacha)
30	DF	BUL	Pavel Kovachev (from CSKA Sofia)
33	GK	BUL	Teodor Skorchev (from Maritsa)
77	FW	BUL	Georgi Andonov (from Cherno More)

Out: Note: Flags indicate national team as defined under FIFA eligibility rules; some limited exceptions apply. Players may hold more than one non-FIFA nationality.

No.	Pos.	Nation	Player
—	MF	BUL	Atanas Apostolov (to Sliven)

== Sportist Svoge ==
In: Note: Flags indicate national team as defined under FIFA eligibility rules; some limited exceptions apply. Players may hold more than one non-FIFA nationality.

No.	Pos.	Nation	Player
2	DF	BUL	Danail Bachkov (from Rodopa)
3	DF	BUL	Diyan Donchev (from Spartak Varna)
4	DF	BUL	Borislav Iliev (from Dunav)
15	DF	NGA	Victor Deniran (from Slavia)
18	MF	BUL	Aleksandar Sabev (on loan from CSKA Sofia)
20	MF	BUL	Nikolay Chipev (on loan from CSKA Sofia)
23	DF	BUL	Nikolay Harizanov (from Botev Plovdiv)
25	FW	ARG	Germán Pietrobon (from CSKA Sofia)
30	MF	BUL	Georgi Korudzhiev (from Spartak Plovdiv)
32	MF	BUL	Stoycho Mladenov (from Akademik)
33	DF	BUL	Martin Dimov (on loan from Levski)
77	MF	BUL	Georgi Chakarov (on loan from Levski)
90	FW	BUL	Petar Shopov (from Anagennisi Karditsa)
99	FW	BUL	Georgi Semerdzhiev (from Botev Plovdiv)

Out: Note: Flags indicate national team as defined under FIFA eligibility rules; some limited exceptions apply. Players may hold more than one non-FIFA nationality.

No.	Pos.	Nation	Player
4	DF	BUL	Cvyatko Ivanov (released)
18	DF	BUL	Stefan Cvetkov (released)
21	MF	BUL	Ivan Pavlov (to Spartak Varna)
22	MF	BUL	Ivan Terziyski (released)
27	FW	BUL	Martin Stefanov (to Nesebar)
33	GK	BUL	Martin Kochev (released)
