= 2009–10 PFC Botev Plovdiv season =

Botev Plovdiv
2009–10 season
- Chairman: Dimitar Hristolov
- Manager: Enrico Piccioni
- A PFG: -
- Bulgarian Cup: First round
- Top goalscorer: League: Morini (5); All: Morini (5)
- Highest home attendance: 6,500 (vs Lokomotiv Plovdiv)

For the 2009-10 season, Botev Plovdiv will be competing in the A PFG.

== Transfers ==
=== Summer Transfers ===
In: Note: Flags indicate national team as defined under FIFA eligibility rules; some limited exceptions apply. Players may hold more than one non-FIFA nationality.

No.	Pos.	Nation	Player
3	DF	ITA	Ciro Sirignano (from Sambenedettese)
5	DF	CMR	Gustave Bahoken (from Bradford)
6	DF	ITA	Marco D'Argenio (from A.C.D. Torgiano)
9	MF	BUL	Hristo Stalev (from Svilengrad)
10	MF	ITA	Emanuele Morini (from Sambenedettese)
11	FW	ITA	Alan Carlet (from Torres)
15	MF	ITA	Gilberto Zanoletti (from Cremonese)
17	DF	ITA	Fabio Tinazzi (from Sambenedettese)
18	MF	BUL	Boris Blagoev (from Brestnik 1948)
21	FW	ITA	Alberto Rebecca (from Venezia)
22	GK	BUL	Ventsislav Velinov (from CSKA Sofia)
23	MF	ITA	Massimiliano Brizzi (from Novara Calcio)
24	DF	URU	Sebastián Flores (from Cherno More)
25	DF	NGR	Daniel Ola (from A.C. Cesena)
28	DF	BUL	Anton Vergilov (from Marek)
69	GK	ITA	Luca Brignoli (from Ravenna Calcio)
99	FW	HON	Luis López (from Alacranes de Durango)

Out: Note: Flags indicate national team as defined under FIFA eligibility rules; some limited exceptions apply. Players may hold more than one non-FIFA nationality.

No.	Pos.	Nation	Player
3	DF	BUL	Daniel Bozhkov (to Widzew Łódź)
8	MF	BUL	Todor Timonov (to CSKA Sofia)
11	FW	BUL	Georgi Andonov (end of loan)
14	DF	BUL	Nikolay Harizanov (to Sportist)
15	DF	BUL	Apostol Popov (to CSKA Sofia)
18	MF	BUL	Georgi Avramov (to Spartak Plovdiv)
20	MF	BUL	Nikolay Manchev (to CSKA Sofia)
21	MF	CMR	Alfred Mapoka (to FC Pinggau/Friedberg)
23	DF	BUL	Zdravko Stankov (to Lokomotiv Mezdra)
24	DF	BUL	Ilian Garov (to Lokomotiv Sofia)
36	GK	BUL	Lilcho Arsov (retired)
99	FW	BUL	Georgi Semerdzhiev (to Sportist)

=== Winter Transfers ===
In: Note: Flags indicate national team as defined under FIFA eligibility rules; some limited exceptions apply. Players may hold more than one non-FIFA nationality.

No.	Pos.	Nation	Player

Out: Note: Flags indicate national team as defined under FIFA eligibility rules; some limited exceptions apply. Players may hold more than one non-FIFA nationality.

No.	Pos.	Nation	Player
1	GK	BUL	Ventsislav Velinov (Released)
2	DF	BUL	Vasil Vasilev (Released)
3	MF	ITA	Ciro Sirignano (Released)
4	MF	ITA	Marco Di Paolo (Released)
6	DF	ITA	Marco D'Argenio (Released)
9	MF	BUL	Hristo Stalev (Released)
10	MF	ITA	Emanuele Morini (Released)
11	MF	BUL	Ivan Karamanov (Released)
13	MF	BUL	Chudomir Grigorov (Released)
15	MF	ITA	Gilberto Zanoletti (Released)
16	FW	ITA	Alberto Rebecca (Released)
17	DF	ITA	Fabio Tinazzi (Released)
17	MF	BUL	Todor Todorov (Released)
18	DF	BUL	Asen Popov (Released)
18	MF	BUL	Stoyan Grancharski (Released)
20	MF	BUL	Vasil Kochev (Released)
21	MF	CMR	Alfred Mapoka (Released)
23	MF	ITA	Massimiliano Brizzi (Released)
26	FW	BUL	Yordan Etov (Released)
29	DF	NGR	Daniel Ola (Released)
32	FW	ITA	Alan Carlet (Released)
69	GK	ITA	Luca Brignoli (Released)
77	FW	BUL	Ilian Yordanov (Released)

== Players ==
=== Appearances and goals ===
Appearance and goalscoring records for all the players who are in the Botev Plovdiv first team squad during the 2009–10 season.

No.	Pos	Nat	Player	Total		A Group		Bulgarian Cup	
No.	Pos	Nat	Player	Apps	Goals	Apps	Goals	Apps	Goals
4	MF	(Bulgaria) BUL	Svetoslav Iliev	5	0	5	0	0	0
5	DF	(Bulgaria) BUL	Stoyan Angelov	4	0	4	0	0	0
5	DF	(Bulgaria) BUL	Anton Vergilov	4	0	4	0	0	0
7	MF	(Bulgaria) BUL	Boris Blagoev	7	0	7	0	0	0
8	FW	(Ghana) GHA	Erick Kabu	8	0	8	0	0	0
15	MF	(Bulgaria) BUL	Lyubomir Aleksandrov	1	0	1	0	0	0
17	DF	(Bulgaria) BUL	Tomi Tomev	1	0	1	0	0	0
17	MF	(Bulgaria) BUL	Tsvetelin Tonev	1	0	1	0	0	0
20	DF	(Bulgaria) BUL	Deyan Bekyarov	3	0	3	0	0	0
22	FW	(Bulgaria) BUL	Petko Vasilev	4	0	3	0	1	0
27	DF	(Cameroon) CMR	Gustave Bahoken	5	0	4	0	1	0
30	GK	(Bulgaria) BUL	Rumen Popov	2	0	2	0	0	0
80	FW	(Brazil) BRA	Alexandre Serdeira	1	0	1	0	0	0
90	DF	(Italy) ITA	Ilario Lana	0	0	0	0	0	0
99	FW	(Honduras) HON	Luis López	0	0	0	0	0	0
Players not a part of the club after the start of the season:
1	GK	(Bulgaria) BUL	Ventsislav Velinov	6	0	6	0	0	0
2	DF	(Bulgaria) BUL	Vasil Vasilev	8	0	8	0	0	0
3	MF	(Italy) ITA	Ciro Sirignano	11	0	10	0	1	0
4	MF	(Italy) ITA	Marco Di Paolo	4	0	3	0	1	0
6	DF	(Italy) ITA	Marco D'Argenio	5	0	5	0	0	0
9	MF	(Bulgaria) BUL	Hristo Stalev	6	0	6	0	0	0
10	MF	(Italy) ITA	Emanuele Morini	10	6	10	6	0	0
11	MF	(Bulgaria) BUL	Ivan Karamanov	9	2	8	2	1	0
13	DF	(Bulgaria) BUL	Chudomir Grigorov	13	0	12	0	1	0
15	MF	(Italy) ITA	Gilberto Zanoletti	9	1	9	1	0	0
16	FW	(Italy) ITA	Alberto Rebecca	7	0	6	0	1	0
17	DF	(Italy) ITA	Fabio Tinazzi	10	0	9	0	1	0
17	MF	(Bulgaria) BUL	Todor Todorov	1	0	1	0	0	0
18	DF	(Bulgaria) BUL	Asen Popov	1	0	1	0	0	0
18	MF	(Bulgaria) BUL	Stoyan Grancharski	1	0	0	0	1	0
19	DF	(Bulgaria) BUL	Dimitar Vitanov	11	0	11	0	0	0
20	MF	(Bulgaria) BUL	Vasil Kochev	13	1	12	1	1	0
21	MF	(Cameroon) CMR	Alfred Mapoka	4	0	3	0	1	0
23	MF	(Italy) ITA	Massimiliano Brizzi	10	0	9	0	1	0
24	DF	(Uruguay) URU	Sebastián Flores	2	0	2	0	0	0
26	MF	(Bulgaria) BUL	Yordan Etov	5	1	5	1	0	0
29	DF	(Nigeria) NGR	Daniel Ola	6	0	6	0	0	0
32	FW	(Italy) ITA	Alan Carlet	7	0	7	0	0	0
69	GK	(Italy) ITA	Luca Brignoli	8	0	7	0	1	0
77	MF	(Bulgaria) BUL	Ilian Yordanov	10	2	9	1	1	1

== TBI A Football Group ==
=== League table ===
Pos	Team	Pld	W	D	L	GF	GA	GD	Pts	Qualification or relegation
12	Lokomotiv Plovdiv	30	9	6	15	36	52	−16	33	
13	Sliven	30	9	5	16	29	40	−11	32	
14	Lokomotiv Mezdra (R)	30	7	6	17	30	48	−18	27	Relegation to 2010–11 B Group
15	Sportist Svoge (R)	30	5	4	21	23	59	−36	19	Relegation to 2010–11 B Group
16	Botev Plovdiv (Note: Botev Plovdiv were expelled from the league during the winter break because they were unable to meet the criteria required to continue the season, and deducted six points for administrative irregularities. All of their remaining matches have been scratched and will be counted as a 3–0 win for their opponents.) (R)	30	1	4	25	12	78	−66	1	Relegation to 2010–11 B Group

Source: A PFG (in Bulgarian)
Rules for classification: 1st points; 2nd head-to-head points; 3rd head-to-head goal difference; 4th head-to-head goals scored; 5th head-to-head away goals scored; 6th goal difference; 7th goals scored
(R) Relegated

=== Results ===
Win Draw Loss

Note: Results are given with Botev Plovdiv score listed first.

Game	Date	Venue	Opponent	Result F–A	Attendance	Botev Plovdiv Goalscorers
1	8 August 2009	A	Levski Sofia	0-5	1,270
2	15 August 2009	H	Montana	2-3	220	Etov 19', Kochev 22'
3	22 August 2009	A	Sliven	0-3	2,130
4	30 August 2009	A	Cherno more	0-3	2,350
5	14 September 2009	H	Minyor Pernik	0-3	150
6	20 September 2009	A	Litex Lovech	1-2	620	Morini 75'
7	26 September 2009	H	Slavia Sofia	0-1	3,080
8	3 October 2009	A	Lokomotiv Sofia	2-2	800	Karamanov 17', Morini 51'
9	17 October 2009	H	CSKA Sofia	0-1	6,440
10	24 October 2009	A	Chernomorets	0-2	750
11	31 October 2009	H	Lokomotiv Plovdiv	1-0	6,500	Morini 86'
12	7 November 2009	A	Beroe	1-3	6,650	Zanoletti 8'
13	21 November 2009	H	Sportist	1-1	380	Morini 24'
14	28 November 2009	A	Lokomotiv Mezdra	2-2	300	Karamanov 54', Yordanov 79'
15	5 December 2009	H	Pirin	2-2	550	Morini (2) 26', 80'

== Bulgarian Cup ==
=== Results ===
Win Draw Loss

Note: Results are given with Botev Plovdiv score listed first.

Round	Date	Venue	Opponent	Result F–A	Attendance	Botev Plovdiv Goalscorers
1	25 November 2009	A	Lokomotiv Sofia	1-2	500	Yordanov 5'
