= List of Bulgarian football transfers winter 2009–10 =

This is a list of Bulgarian football transfers in the winter transfer window 2010 by club. Only transfers of the A PFG clubs are listed.

== Litex ==
In:

No.	Pos.	Nation	Player
31	GK	BRA	Rodrigo Galatto (on loan from Atlético Paranaense)

Out:

No.	Pos.	Nation	Player
12	GK	BUL	Todor Todorov (on loan to OFC Sliven 2000)
24	MF	BRA	Adriano Miranda (on loan to OFC Sliven 2000)
99	FW	BUL	Dormushali Saidhodzha (loan return to CSKA Sofia)

== CSKA Sofia ==
In:

No.	Pos.	Nation	Player
8	MF	BUL	Rumen Trifonov (from Minyor Pernik)
9	FW	BUL	Dimitar Iliev (from Lokomotiv Plovdiv)
17	MF	ROU	Florentin Petre (from Terek Grozny)
18	MF	BUL	Boris Galchev (from Pirin Blagoevgrad)
23	MF	ROU	Daniel Pancu (from Terek Grozny)
29	DF	MKD	Igor Mitreski (from Energie Cottbus)
88	MF	FRA	Elliot Grandin (from Olympique de Marseille)
99	FW	BUL	Dormushali Saidhodzha (loan return from Litex Lovech)

Out:

No.	Pos.	Nation	Player
3	MF	POR	David Silva (on loan to CD Castellón)
6	DF	BUL	Kiril Kotev (to Lokomotiv Plovdiv)
8	MF	BUL	Todor Timonov (to Anzhi Makhachkala)
9	FW	BUL	Dimitar Iliev (on loan to Minyor Pernik)
15	DF	BUL	Ivan Ivanov (to Alania Vladikavkaz)
18	MF	BUL	Atanas Zehirov (on loan to OFC Sliven 2000)
30	MF	BUL	Yordan Todorov (to Lokomotiv Plovdiv)
36	MF	BUL	Yanko Sandanski (to Pirin)
73	FW	BUL	Ivan Stoyanov (to Alania Vladikavkaz)

== Chernomorets ==
In:

No.	Pos.	Nation	Player
12	GK	BUL	Stoyan Kolev (from Oţelul Galaţi)
17	MF	ROU	Cristian Muscalu (from FK Baku)
14	MF	POR	Ricardo André (from Cherno More)
28	FW	BUL	Branimir Kostadinov (from Chernomorets Pomorie)
23	MF	POR	Pedrinha (from Paços de Ferreira)
11	FW	BRA	Dalmo (from 1. FC Brno)
29	DF	BUL	Emil Koparanov (from Etar Veliko Tarnovo)
30	DF	BUL	Velin Damyanov (from Chernomorets Pomorie)
31	DF	BRA	Gabriel Atz (from Rubin Kazan)

Out:

No.	Pos.	Nation	Player
1	GK	BUL	Vladislav Stoyanov (to Sheriff Tiraspol)
11	FW	BRA	Dudu (to FC Thun)
12	GK	BUL	Plamen Kolev (on loan to Chernomorets Pomorie)
14	FW	BUL	Georgi Bozhilov (to Cherno More)
15	MF	SRB	Aleksandar Stoimirović (to Čukarički)
16	MF	BUL	Svetlin Simeonov (to Dunav Rousse)
17	FW	BUL	Georgi Chilikov (to Lokomotiv Plovdiv)

== Lokomotiv Sofia ==
In:

No.	Pos.	Nation	Player
9	FW	BUL	Tsvetan Genkov (on loan from Dinamo Moscow)

Out:

No.	Pos.	Nation	Player
28	FW	MKD	Zoran Baldovaliev (to Hapoel Kiryat Shmona)

== Levski Sofia ==
In:

No.	Pos.	Nation	Player
4	DF	BUL	Stefan Stanchev (loan return from Pirin)
6	MF	GHA	Michael Tawiah (from Lokomotiv Mezdra)
7	MF	BUL	Aleksandar Aleksandrov (from Cherno More)
19	FW	BUL	Miroslav Antonov (from Sportist)
21	DF	SVK	Peter Petráš (from Slovan Bratislava)
—	FW	BUL	Ivan Tsachev (loan return from Pirin)

Out:

No.	Pos.	Nation	Player
3	DF	BUL	Zhivko Milanov (to Vaslui)
5	DF	MAR	Youssef Rabeh (to Anzhi Makhachkala)
17	FW	NGA	Deniran Ortega (loan return to Slavia Sofia)
21	MF	BRA	Zé Soares (to Metalurh Donetsk)
28	FW	BUL	Aleksandar Kirov (on loan to Lokomotiv Mezdra)
43	FW	BUL	Boyan Tabakov (on loan to Lokomotiv Mezdra)
44	MF	BUL	Borislav Baldzhiyski (on loan to Lokomotiv Mezdra)
50	DF	BUL	Simeon Ivanov (to Rayo Vallecano)
99	FW	BUL	Georgi Hristov (on loan to Wisła Kraków)

== Minyor ==
In:

No.	Pos.	Nation	Player
7	MF	BUL	Mladen Stoev (from Vihren Sandanski)
8	DF	BUL	Nikolay Harizanov (from Sportist Svoge)
22	DF	BUL	Yuri Ivanov (from Spartak Varna)
31	FW	SRB	Pavle Delibašić (from FK Zemun)
41	FW	BUL	Dimitar Iliev (on loan from CSKA Sofia)

Out:

No.	Pos.	Nation	Player
5	DF	BUL	Ventsislav Vasilev (to Aris Limassol)
8	MF	BUL	Rumen Trifonov (to CSKA Sofia)
20	MF	BUL	Nikolay Stankov (to Beroe)

== Slavia ==
In:

No.	Pos.	Nation	Player
1	GK	BUL	Stefano Kunchev (from Lokomotiv Mezdra)
5	MF	BRA	Francisco Alberoni (from Duque de Caxias)
7	MF	BUL	Iliya Iliev (from Sliven)
8	FW	BUL	Petar Dimitrov (from Beroe)
28	DF	BUL	Aleksandar Tomash (from FK Baku)
77	MF	BUL	Daniel Peev (from Pirin)

Out:

No.	Pos.	Nation	Player
5	DF	BUL	Martin Kavdanski (on loan to Lokomotiv Mezdra)
10	MF	BUL	Asen Nikolov (to Le Pontet)
11	FW	NGA	Deniran Ortega (on loan to Banants)
23	GK	BUL	Yordan Gospodinov (on loan to Lokomotiv Mezdra)
28	FW	BRA	Eduardo Du Bala (to Banants)
44	DF	BUL	Simeon Mechev (on loan to Montana)
77	FW	BUL	Milan Koprivarov (on loan to Lokomotiv Mezdra)

== Beroe ==
In:

No.	Pos.	Nation	Player
8	MF	BUL	Ivan Kanev (from Botev Galabovo)
9	FW	BUL	Ivan Chergev (from Botev Galabovo)
20	MF	BUL	Nikolay Stankov (from Minyor Pernik)
21	MF	BUL	Milen Tanev (from Chernomorets Balchik)
27	FW	BUL	Atanas Apostolov (from OFC Sliven 2000)
29	MF	BUL	Simeon Minchev (from Volov Shumen)

Out:

No.	Pos.	Nation	Player
8	FW	BUL	Petar Dimitrov (to Slavia Sofia)
10	MF	BUL	Kostadin Vidolov (retired)
19	MF	SRB	Igor Tasković (to Montana)
20	MF	BUL	Ahmed Hikmet (to Montana)
25	DF	BUL	Aleksandar Aleksandrov (to Cherno More)

== Pirin ==
In:

No.	Pos.	Nation	Player
11	FW	BUL	Dimitar Vodenicharov (from Spartak Varna)
14	MF	BUL	Yanko Sandanski (from CSKA Sofia)
15	FW	BUL	Todor Simov (from Sportist)
21	MF	BUL	Nikolay Demirov (loan return from Septemvri Simitli)

Out:

No.	Pos.	Nation	Player
5	DF	BUL	Stefan Stanchev (loan return to Levski)
9	FW	BUL	Ivan Tsachev (loan return to Levski)
14	DF	BUL	Georgi Samokishev (to Pirin Gotse Delchev)
18	MF	BUL	Boris Galchev (to CSKA Sofia)
28	MF	BUL	Daniel Peev (to Slavia Sofia)

== Cherno More ==
In:

No.	Pos.	Nation	Player
14	FW	BUL	Georgi Bozhilov (from Chernomorets Burgas)
18	MF	BUL	Georgi Avramov (from Spartak Plovdiv)
25	DF	BUL	Aleksandar Aleksandrov (from Beroe)
27	MF	EST	Daniil Ratnikov (from Trans Narva)

Out:

No.	Pos.	Nation	Player
9	FW	BUL	Georgi Kakalov (loan return to Dinamo Minsk)
10	MF	BUL	Alex (to Levski Sofia)
11	FW	BUL	Zdravko Lazarov (to Lokomotiv Plovdiv)
17	MF	BUL	Martin Kerchev (to Lokomotiv Mezdra)

== Montana ==
In:

No.	Pos.	Nation	Player
1	GK	BUL	Hristo Ivanov (from Lokomotiv Mezdra)
4	MF	BUL	Ahmed Hikmet (from Beroe)
18	DF	BUL	Stanislav Zhekov (from Spartak Varna)
19	MF	SRB	Igor Tasković (from Beroe)
22	DF	BUL	Simeon Mechev (on loan from Slavia Sofia)
28	FW	BUL	Aleksandar Kirov (on loan from Levski Sofia)

Out:

No.	Pos.	Nation	Player
1	GK	BUL	Tsvetomir Tsankov (to Banants)
3	DF	BRA	Júlio César (to Metalurh Donetsk)
5	DF	BUL	Nikolay Nikolov (to Banants)
19	MF	BRA	Beto (to Banants)

== Lokomotiv Mezdra ==
In:

No.	Pos.	Nation	Player
2	DF	BUL	Martin Kavdanski (on loan from Slavia Sofia)
3	DF	BUL	Kiril Djorov (from Vihren Sandanski)
11	MF	BUL	Borislav Baldzhiyski (on loan from Levski Sofia)
17	MF	BUL	Martin Kerchev (from Cherno More)
21	FW	BUL	Boyan Tabakov (on loan from Levski Sofia)
22	FW	BUL	Desislav Rusev (from Vihren Sandanski)
23	GK	BUL	Yordan Gospodinov (on loan from Slavia Sofia)
77	MF	BUL	Milan Koprivarov (on loan from Slavia Sofia)

Out:

No.	Pos.	Nation	Player
1	GK	BUL	Hristo Ivanov (to Montana)
18	MF	GHA	Michael Tawiah (to Levski Sofia)
22	GK	BUL	Stefano Kunchev (to Slavia Sofia)

== Sportist ==
In:

No.	Pos.	Nation	Player
8	FW	BUL	Georgi Bizhev (from Spartak Varna)
12	GK	TUR	Deniz Özlem (from Bursaspor)
19	FW	BUL	Evgeni Ignatov (on loan from OFC Sliven 2000)
23	MF	BUL	Svetoslav Petrov (from Vihren Sandanski)
77	MF	BUL	Marin Petrov (free agent)
90	DF	BUL	Dimitar Nakov (from Irtysh Pavlodar)

Out:

No.	Pos.	Nation	Player
9	FW	BUL	Miroslav Antonov (to Levski Sofia)
18	MF	BUL	Aleksandar Sabev (to Kaliakra Kavarna)
19	FW	BUL	Todor Simov (to Pirin Blagoevgrad)
20	MF	BUL	Nikolay Chipev (to Lokomotiv Plovdiv)
23	DF	BUL	Nikolay Harizanov (to Minyor Pernik)
77	MF	BUL	Georgi Chakarov (loan return to Levski Sofia)
90	FW	BUL	Petar Shopov (to Septemvri Simitli)

== Sliven ==
In:

No.	Pos.	Nation	Player
1	GK	BUL	Todor Todorov (on loan from Litex Lovech)
2	DF	BUL	Kristian Mitev (from Stambolovo)
9	FW	SRB	Saša Popin (from Metalac Novi Sad)
18	MF	BUL	Atanas Zehirov (on loan from CSKA Sofia)
32	MF	BRA	Adriano Miranda (on loan from Litex Lovech)

Out:

No.	Pos.	Nation	Player
11	FW	BUL	Atanas Apostolov (to Beroe)
15	MF	BUL	Iliya Iliev (to Slavia Sofia)
19	FW	BUL	Evgeni Ignatov (on loan to Sportist)

== Lokomotiv Plovdiv ==
In:

No.	Pos.	Nation	Player
3	DF	BUL	Valeri Georgiev (from Vihren)
5	DF	FRA	Youness Bengelloun (from Olympiakos Nicosia)
7	MF	BUL	Yordan Todorov (from CSKA Sofia)
10	FW	BUL	Rangel Abushev (from Vihren)
14	DF	BUL	Kostadin Gadzhalov (from Botev Plovdiv)
15	DF	BUL	Boyan Iliev (from Spartak Varna)
16	MF	BUL	Nikolay Chipev (from Sportist)
29	FW	BUL	Georgi Chilikov (from Chernomorets Burgas)
39	FW	FRA	Garra Dembélé (from Pierikos)
55	DF	BUL	Kiril Kotev (from CSKA Sofia)
77	FW	BUL	Zdravko Lazarov (from Cherno More)
80	MF	HUN	Erős Gábor (from Pyrsos Grevena)

Out:

No.	Pos.	Nation	Player
7	MF	BUL	Hristian Popov (on loan to Septemvri Simitli)
9	FW	BUL	Georgi Bozhilov (loan return to Chernomorets)
14	FW	BUL	Dimitar Iliev (to CSKA Sofia)
17	FW	BUL	Veselin Marchev (on loan to Septemvri Simitli)
30	DF	BEN	Félicien Singbo (released)

== Botev Plovdiv ==
In:

No.	Pos.	Nation	Player

Out:

No.	Pos.	Nation	Player
2	DF	BUL	Vasil Vasilev (released)
3	DF	ITA	Ciro Sirignano (to Pescina)
4	MF	ITA	Marco Di Paolo (to Ostiamare Lido Calcio)
6	DF	ITA	Marco D'Argenio (to Pro Vasto)
9	MF	BUL	Hristo Stalev (to Svetkavitsa)
10	FW	ITA	Emanuele Morini (to Foggia)
13	DF	BUL	Chudomir Grigorov (to Spartak Plovdiv)
15	MF	ITA	Gilberto Zanoletti (to Pizzighettone)
17	DF	ITA	Fabio Tinazzi (to Sporting Terni)
20	MF	BUL	Vasil Kochev (to Chernomorets Balchik)
21	MF	CMR	Alfred Mapoka (to Ahly Tripoli)
23	MF	ITA	Massimiliano Brizzi (released)
25	DF	URU	Sebastián Flores (to Aris Limassol)
26	MF	BUL	Yordan Etov (to Brestnik 1948)
29	DF	NGA	Daniel Ola (to Persebaya Surabaya)
31	DF	BUL	Kostadin Gadzhalov (to Lokomotiv Plovdiv)
32	FW	ITA	Alan Carlet (to Sporting Terni)
69	GK	ITA	Luca Brignoli (to Albate Calcio)
99	FW	ITA	Alberto Rebecca (to Carpenedolo)
