= Adeniran =

Adéníran
- Gender: Unsex
- Language: Yoruba

Origin
- Origin: Yorubaland
- Meaning: The royal family has a known ancestry; The king (or head) has a vision; or My lineage has royalty.
- Region of origin: Yorubaland [Nigeria, Benin, Togo]

pronunciation

Adéníran audio is a male given name and surname of Yoruba origin. It means "The royal family has a known ancestry; The king (or head) has a vision; or My lineage has royalty.". The name Adéníran is a unique and culturally significant name and primarily used among the royal families or royal lineage. The diminutive forms are Déníran and Niran with the same meaning but in shorter forms.

== Notable people with this name include ==
- Adeniran Ogunsanya (1918–1996), Nigerian lawyer and politician
- Daniel Ajayi-Adeniran, Pentecostal pastor from Nigeria
- Dennis Adeniran (born 1999), English professional footballer
- Mo Adeniran (born 1995), English singer
- Sade Adeniran, Nigerian novelist
- Samuel Adeniran (born 1998), American professional soccer player
- Tunde Adeniran (born 1945), Nigerian scholar, politician and diplomat
