= Marco Taccucci =

Italian footballer

Personal information
- Date of birth: 2 February 1977 (age 49)
- Place of birth: Perugia, Italy
- Height: 1.80 m (5 ft 11 in)
- Position: Defender

Senior career*
| Years | Team | Apps | (Gls) |
| 1995–1996 | Arezzo | 20 | (?) |
| 1996–2001 | Nestor Marsciano | ? | (?) |
| 2001–2005 | Sambenedettese | 85 | (3) |
| 2005–2006 | Juve Stabia | 33 | (0) |
| 2006–2007 | Venezia | 31 | (3) |
| 2007–2009 | Monza | 38 | (1) |
| 2009–2011 | Perugia | 42 | (2) |
| 2011–2015 | Sporting Terni | | |
| 2015–2016 | Subasio | | |
| 2016–2018 | Angelana | | |
| 2018–2020 | Castel del Piano | | |
| 2020–2021 | Angelana | | |
| 2021–2022 | San Sisto | | |
- * Club domestic league appearances and goals

Marco Taccucci (born 2 February 1977) is an Italian former footballer.

Taccucci spent most of his career at Italian Lega Pro, the third and fourth highest level of the pyramid.

== Biography ==
In 2001, he played a pre-season friendly for Sambenedettese, against Perugia. He then trailed in Perugia and played in pre-season. However, he returned to Samb and remained for 4 seasons. Since winning 2001–02 Serie C2 promotion playoffs, he played in Serie C1 (later called Prima Divisione) from 2002 until 2010. He joined Juve Stabia in 2005 and for Venezia in 2006. In July 2007 he was signed by Monza.

He returned to Perugia in 2009, which the team knew as "Perugia Calcio" at that time. Despite finished as the 11th, the team bankrupted. A new team, ASD Perugia Calcio, was admitted to Serie D. He followed the new team, winning Group E and promoted. He then left for another Umbria team Sporting Terni.
