= Stalev =

Stalev (Bulgarian: Сталев) is a Slavic masculine surname, its feminine counterpart is Staleva. It may refer to

- Evgeny Stalev (born 1979), Russian billiards player
- Hristo Stalev (born 1985), Bulgarian football player
- Stoyan Stalev (born 1952), Bulgarian politician; Minister of Foreign Affairs of Bulgaria (1997)
