= Grigorov =

Grigorov (Bulgarian: Григоров) is a Bulgarian masculine surname; its feminine counterpart is Grigorova. It may refer to

- Anri Grigorov (born 1964), Bulgarian sprinter
- Antoniya Grigorova (born 1986), Bulgarian cross-country skier
- Bozhidar Grigorov (born 1945), Bulgarian football player
- Chudomir Grigorov (born 1989), Bulgarian football defender
- Kristiyan Grigorov (born 1990), Bulgarian football centre-back
- Mario Grigorov, Bulgarian composer and concert pianist
- Mariya Grigorova (born 1996), Kazakhstani alpine skier
- Rayna Grigorova (born 1931), Bulgarian artistic gymnast
- Stamen Grigorov (1878–1945), Bulgarian physician and microbiologist
  - Grigorov Glacier in Antarctica named after Stamen
- Stanislav Grigorov (born 1968), Bulgarian wrestler
- Viktoriya Grigorova (born 1990), Bulgarian volleyball player
- Vyachaslaw Hryharaw (born 1982), Belarusian football coach and former player
