= Kochev =

Kochev (Bulgarian: Кочев; also appearing in the transliteration variants Kočev, Kocheff, Kotcheff or Kotschew) – with its female form Kocheva (Bulgarian: Кочева) – is a Bulgarian and Macedonian surname which is derived from the male given name Kocho (Bulgarian: Кочо), a shortened version of the Bulgarian given name Nikolai/Nikolay (Bulgarian: Николай) that stems from the Greek name Nicholas (Greek: Νικόλαος), meaning "victor of the people."

Notable people with the name Kochev/Kotcheff include:

- Krasimir Kochev (1974–2025), Bulgarian freestyle wrestler
- Mariya Kocheva (born 1974), retired Bulgarian backstroke swimmer
- Ted Kotcheff (born 1931), Bulgarian-Canadian film and television director and producer
- Vasil Kochev (born 1988), Bulgarian footballer
