= Zanoletti =

Zanoletti is an Italian surname. Notable people with the surname include:

- Costanza Zanoletti (born 1980), Italian skeleton racer
- Gilberto Zanoletti (born 1980), Italian footballer
