= Vergilov =

Vergilov may refer to:

- Anton Vergilov (born 1985), Bulgarian footballer
- Vergilov Rocks, rock formation in Antarctica
