= Terziyski =

Terziyski (Bulgarian: Терзийски) is a Bulgarian surname. The feminine form of the name is Terziyska (Bulgarian: Терзийска). Notable people with the surname include:

- Ivan Terziyski (born 1980), Bulgarian footballer
- Julia Terziyska (born 1996), Bulgarian inactive tennis player
- Kalin Terziyski (1970–2026), Bulgarian poet and writer
- Neno Terziyski (born 1964), Bulgarian weightlifter
- Rayna Kirilova Terziyska (born 1981), known as Rayna (singer), Bulgarian pop-folk singer and singer of traditional music
