= Tsvetomir Matev =

Bulgarian footballer

Personal information
- Full name: Tsvetomir Todorov Matev
- Date of birth: 22 June 1986 (age 40)
- Place of birth: Haskovo, Bulgaria
- Height: 1.81 m (5 ft 11 in)
- Position: Forward

Team information
- Current team: Haskovo
- Number: 13

Youth career
- Haskovo

Senior career*
Years	Team	Apps	(Gls)
2005–2007	Haskovo	58	(11)
2008–2009	Sliven 2000	12	(2)
2008–2009	→ Svilengrad 1921 (loan)	21	(2)
2009	Lokomotiv Mezdra	1	(0)
2010–2011	Lyubimets 2007	33	(10)
2011–2012	Neftochimic 1986	10	(3)
2012–2013	Dimitrovgrad	?	(13)
2013–	Haskovo	7	(0)
- * Club domestic league appearances and goals as of November 13, 2013

Tsvetomir Matev (Bulgarian: Цветомир Матев; born 22 June 1986) is a Bulgarian footballer who currently plays for Haskovo as a forward.

== Career ==
Just for one transfer window, Matev has changed two teams. Firstly on 3 January 2008 he was bought from FC Haskovo to Levski Sofia. Then on 20 February 2008 he was sold to OFC Sliven 2000. In June 2008 he was loaned out for one year to FC Svilengrad 1921. On 13 July 2009 Lokomotiv Mezdra signed Matev for a two-year deal.
