= Berkut Stadium =

Football stadium in Bulgaria

Coordinates: 42°03′30″N 24°45′28″E

- Berkut Stadium
- Interactive map of Berkut Stadium
- Location: Brestnik, Plovdiv Province, Bulgaria
- Owner: K-I Invest Holding AD
- Operator: Brestnik 1948
- Capacity: 3,000
- Surface: Grass
- Field size: 105 X 68

Construction
- Groundbreaking: December 12, 2007
- Built: 2007 - 2009
- Opened: June 21, 2010
- Cost: € 750,000
- Architect: Ivan Vasilev

Tenant
- Brestnik 1948 (2010-present)

Berkut Stadium (Bulgarian: Стадион Беркут) is a football stadium, located in the small village of Brestnik, in the Plovdiv Province, Bulgaria. The stadium is currently used for football matches and it is the new home ground of the second division Bulgarian football club Brestnik 1948. The new venue was completed in December, 2009 and was opened on June 21, 2010. The construction cost for the stadium was around 750,000 euros and it has a capacity for 3,000 spectators. The pitch's dimensions are 105 to 68 meters. The venue also has electric lightning and it is a part of a modern sports complex, which also includes two tennis courts.

After a number of several delays of the construction, the stadium was officially opened on June 21, 2010.
