= Alek Manolov =

Bulgarian footballer (born 1986)

- Born: Alek Manolov; 29 May 1986 (age 40); German, Bulgaria
- Occupations: Footballer, TV personality
- Television: The Farm Bulgaria
Association football career
- Position: Midfielder
Team information
- Current team: Rilski Sportist
- Number: 10
Youth career
- Conegliano German
- CSKA Sofia
Senior career*
Years	Team	Apps	(Gls)
2006–2007	Chernomorets Burgas Sofia	5	(0)
2007–2008	Velbazhd Kyustendil	?	(?)
2008–2009	Chepinets Velingrad	?	(?)
2009	Chavdar Byala Slatina	?	(0)
2010	Vitosha Bistritsa	?	(?)
2010–2011	Botev Krivodol	27	(4)
2011–2012	Akademik Sofia	24	(4)
2012	Dobrudzha Dobrich	?	(1)
2013	Oborishte	?	(4)
2013–2014	Vidima-Rakovski	?	(4)
2014–2016	Chepinets Velingrad	?	(13)
2016–2018	Germanea Sapareva Banya	10	(5)
2018	Rilski Sportist	12	(2)
2019	Nadezhda Dobroslavtsi	3	(0)
2020–2021	Granit Vladaya	2	(0)
2021–	Rilski Sportist	35	(6)
- * Club domestic league appearances and goals as of 20:27, 22 November 2023 (UTC) ‡ National team caps and goals as of 22:52, 5 September 2015 (UTC)

Alek Manolov (Bulgarian: Алек Манолов; born 29 May 1986) is a Bulgarian footballer. He plays for Rilski Sportist.

== Football career ==
Manolov was a youth player of CSKA Sofia. He began his football career in his local Conegliano German, rebranded as Chernomorets Burgas Sofia in 2006.

== Post-retirement ==
In 2017, he entered the Bulgarian version of The Farm.
