= Boris Blagoev =

Bulgarian football player

Personal information
- Date of birth: 23 June 1985 (age 41)
- Place of birth: Plovdiv, Bulgaria
- Height: 1.80 m (5 ft 11 in)
- Position: Midfielder

Senior career*
| Years | Team | Apps | (Gls) |
| 2003–2006 | Botev Plovdiv | 15 | (0) |
| 2006–2007 | Elegant | ? | (?) |
| 2007–2009 | Brestnik 1948 | 38 | (11) |
| 2009 | Botev Plovdiv | | |
- * Club domestic league appearances and goals as of 22 June 2009

Boris Blagoev (Bulgarian: Борис Благоев; born 23 June 1985 in Plovdiv) is a Bulgarian football player.
