= Yordan Etov =

Bulgarian footballer

Personal information
- Full name: Yordan Borisov Etov
- Date of birth: 10 February 1989 (age 37)
- Place of birth: Kostandovo, Bulgaria
- Height: 1.90 m (6 ft 3 in)
- Positions: Midfielder; forward

Youth career
- Hebar Pazardzhik

Senior career*
Years	Team	Apps	(Gls)
2007–2009	Botev Plovdiv	26	(1)
2010–2011	Brestnik 1948	4	(0)
2011	Chepinets Velingrad	14	(13)
2012–2013	Chavdar Etropole	36	(7)
2013–2014	Doxa Drama	18	(1)
2014–2015	Panargiakos	0	(0)
2015	A.E. Farkadona	?	(5)
2016	Panargiakos	?	(4)
2016–2017	Mandraikos	?	(21)
2017–2018	Irodotos	0	(0)
- * Club domestic league appearances and goals as of 1 July 2014

Yordan Etov (Bulgarian: Йордан Етов; born 10 February 1989) is a Bulgarian footballer who currently plays as a forward.

== Career ==
Etov comes directly from Botev`s Youth Academy and still plays mainly for the youth team. On 2007 the Youth Academy forward Yordan Etov agreed the conditions of his first professional contract with the club which will be effective for three years. Etov made his official debut for Botev in a match against Vihren Sandanski on 24 November 2007. He played for 33 minutes. The result of the match was 1:0 with win for Botev.
