= Ivan Karamanov =

Bulgarian footballer

Personal information
- Full name: Ivan Atanasov Karamanov
- Date of birth: 23 April 1981 (age 45)
- Place of birth: Plovdiv, Bulgaria
- Height: 1.75 m (5 ft 9 in)
- Position: Midfielder

Senior career*
Years	Team	Apps	(Gls)
1999–2002	Lokomotiv Plovdiv	42	(5)
2002–2004	Botev Plovdiv	37	(6)
2004–2005	FK Qarabağ	19	
2005	Rodopa Smolyan	16	(1)
2006	FC Irtysh	–	(–)
2006–2007	Spartak Plovdiv	20	(8)
2007	FK Riga	17	(0)
2008	Beroe Stara Zagora	16	(0)
2008–2009	Lokomotiv Plovdiv	24	(0)
2009–2010	Botev Plovdiv	16	(2)
2011	Spartak Plovdiv	15	(5)
2012	Rakovski	17	(3)
2012–2013	New Radiant Sports Club	18	(2)
2013–2014	Magway	–	(–)
2015	Oborishte	8	(1)
- * Club domestic league appearances and goals as of 7 June 2015

Ivan Karamanov (Bulgarian: Иван Караманов) (born 23 April 1981 in Plovdiv) is a Bulgarian football player, currently playing as a midfielder.

== Career ==
Ivan Karamanov began his professional career during the 1999–2000 season with Lokomotiv Plovdiv. He made his official debut on 24 October 1999, in a match against Septemvri Sofia. In his career Karamanov also played for Rodopa Smolyan, Spartak Plovdiv, Beroe Stara Zagora, Azerbaijani FK Qarabağ, Kazakhstani FC Irtysh Pavlodar and Latvian FK Riga.

In September 2009, he was released from the team and a week later he joined the city rivals Botev Plovdiv. On 23 September, Karamanov signed a one-year contract with the Canaries. A few days later, he was given the vice-captain's armband. He made his re-debut for Botev on 26 September 2009 against Slavia Sofia in the seventh round of the A PFG but left when the club went bankrupt in the early 2010.

Third place with FC Riga Latvia 2007, winner-Champion with New Radiant -Maldives 2012, President cup with New Radiant-Maldives 2012
