= Erick Kabu =

Ghanaian footballer

Eric Cabo
Personal information
- Full name: Erick Kabu
- Date of birth: 21 December 1989 (age 36)
- Place of birth: Accra, Ghana
- Position: Forward

Youth career
- –2006: Accra Hearts of Oak

Senior career*
Years	Team	Apps	(Gls)
2007–2008	Accra Hearts of Oak		
2008–2010	Botev Plovdiv	21	(1)
- * Club domestic league appearances and goals as of 07 December 2008

Erick Kabu (born 21 December 1989 in Accra) is a Ghanaian football (soccer) striker who played in the Bulgarian A PFG for Botev Plovdiv.

== Career ==
Kabu began his career in the youth from Accra Hearts of Oak SC and joined than in summer 2008 to Botev Plovdiv, here played his first professional game in the TBI A Football Group on 4 October 2008 against OFC Sliven 2000.

Kabu left Botev Plovdiv on 26 January 2010 as the club went bankrupt.
