= Tunde Adeniran =

Nigerian Minister of Education

Professor

Minister of Education.
- In office June 1999 – January 2001

Ambassador of Nigeria to Germany.
- In office 2004–2007

Personal details
- Born: 29 September 1945 (age 80) Orin-Ekiti, Ido-Osi LGA, Ekiti State, Nigeria
- Party: Social Democratic Party (SDP)

Tunde Adeniran (born 29 September 1945) is a Nigerian scholar, politician, diplomat, and former minister of education. Before entering politics in 1998, he was a staff of the United Nations and a political science lecturer at the University of Ibadan, after years of lecturing in Nigeria and America. He is the author of several books and journal articles.

== Education ==
Adeniran is a graduate of University of Ibadan, Nigeria and Columbia University, USA.

== Political career ==
From 2004 to 2007, Adeniran served as Nigeria's ambassador to Germany. From October to December 1985, Adeniran was a member of Nigerian delegation to the 40th session of the United Nations General Assembly. He was director of the Directorate for Social Mobilization (MAMSER) from 1987 to 1992 and chairman from January to August 1993. He was a member of the Committee on Nigerian National Defence Policy for the year 2000. He was a member of the Advisory Committee on Foreign Affairs from 1983 to 1985. Adeniran was also a member of the Political Bureau from January 1986 to March 1987. Prior to that, he was a member of the Ondo State Economic Advisory Council from 1980 to 1983. In 1982, Adeniran was a member of Ondo State Local Government Review and Reorganization Committee (Justice Akintan Panel). At party level, Adeniran was a member of the Board of Trustees (BoT) of the Peoples Democratic Party (PDP) until his defection to the Social Democratic Party in 2018.

=== Achievements ===
During his time as the head of the Nigerian mission to Germany, Adeniran worked to improve the image of Nigeria and restore German investors' confidence in the Nigerian economy. Adeniran established exchange programmes meant to deepen collaboration between Nigerian and German institutions in the areas of health, environment and education. As education minister, Adeniran introduced a number of reforms to aid the development of the Nigerian education sector.

=== Awards and honours ===
Adeniran has received several awards and honours. He was awarded the American Medal of Honour in 2001. He became a fellow of the Nigerian National Institute for Educational Planning and Administration (NIEPA) in 2002. He received the Ambassador of Peace/Gold Medal Award for Leadership in 1998 and the Ekiti Parapo Merit Award in 1996. In 2002, Adeniran was conferred with a Fellow of the Federal Polytechnic, Offa, Nigeria (FFPO).

== Community service and advocacy ==
Adeniran thinks that "unless Nigeria makes education free and compulsory up to the secondary school level, and insist on proper training of teachers and quality education for Nigerians", the country would not be able to effectively use technological innovations to ease governance and economic activities including electronic voting. Adeniran called for reforms in Organisation of African Unity that will provide strategies that meet the challenges of conflicts and disputes in African nations. According to Adeniran, "African disputes need a peace-making and peace-keeping machinery for their resolution". On Monday 23 April 2018, Adeniran and other SDP leaders called on "all patriotic Nigerians who believe in national unity, justice, equity and progress to come together and rescue the nation." On Nigeria's image, Adeniran thinks every Nigerian has a responsibility to represent the country well in every aspect and every area of life. He remarked that "we need to continue the promotion of good image through our activities at home and abroad and the correct and credible interpretation of developments" in Nigeria. On the economy, Adeniran thinks Nigeria needs to remain consistent in her economic policies in order to experience significant results. He stated that "through my investment drive, I have realized that we need to remain consistent in our economic policies". He called for synergy among various government agencies, ministries and missions involved in the investment drive. Adeniran thinks Nigeria's local government system, rather than be an instrument of development, is the most tragic aspect of the country's democratic system as it is not run as it should be.

Adeniran is a church leader and a knight of John Wesley. He is involved in a number of charity and community service.
