= Antônio Carlos Heleno =

Brazilian footballer (born 1983)

Personal information
- Full name: Antônio Carlos Heleno de Oliveira
- Date of birth: 5 May 1983 (age 43)
- Place of birth: São Paulo, Brazil
- Height: 1.81 m (5 ft 11 in)
- Position: Midfielder

Youth career
- 2001–2002: Portuguesa

Senior career*
Years	Team	Apps	(Gls)
2003	Portuguesa		
2003–2006	BFC Preussen		
2007	Pelotas		
2007–2008	Oliv. Douro		
2008	Sul Mineiro		
2008–2009	Slavia Sofia	12	(2)
2009–2010	Preussen TV Werl		
- Holanda
- Ceilândia
- Itapevi
- * Club domestic league appearances and goals

Antônio Carlos Heleno de Oliveira (born 5 May 1983) is a Brazilian former professional footballer who played as a midfielder. He played in the highest Bulgarian league for Slavia Sofia.
