= Nikolay Stankov =

Bulgarian footballer

Personal information
- Full name: Nikolay Grozdanov Stankov
- Date of birth: 11 December 1984 (age 41)
- Place of birth: Varna, Bulgaria
- Height: 1.70 m (5 ft 7 in)
- Position: Midfielder

Senior career*
Years	Team	Apps	(Gls)
2003–2005	Cherno More	8	(0)
2005–2006	Nesebar	13	(1)
2006–2007	Kaliakra Kavarna	23	(2)
2007–2009	Minyor Pernik	42	(3)
2010–2011	Beroe Stara Zagora	23	(2)
2011–2012	Dobrudzha Dobrich	16	(1)
2012–2013	Lokomotiv Plovdiv	6	(0)
- * Club domestic league appearances and goals as of March 15, 2013

Nikolay Stankov (Bulgarian: Николай Станков; born 11 December 1984) is a Bulgarian footballer who played as a midfielder.

== Career ==
Born in Varna Stankov started to play football in local club Cherno More. He made his debut on 11 September 2004 in a match against Pirin Blagoevgrad as a 73rd min substitute. Stankov played 8 matches in 2004–05 season.

In 2006 Stankov signed with PFC Nesebar. One year later he joined Kaliakra Kavarna. From summer 2007 to December 2009 he played for Minyor Pernik. With this team he was promoted to the Bulgarian first division during the 2007–08 season after a play-off against Kaliakra. On 29 September 2008 Stankov scored his first goal in A PFG against Spartak Varna. He scored goal in 85th minute. The result of the match was a 3:1 win for Minyor.

On 15 January 2009 Stankov signed with Beroe Stara Zagora.

=== Statistics ===
Last update: 15 July 2010

Season	Team	Country	Division	Apps	Goals
2003-04	Cherno More	Bulgaria	1	0	0
2004-05	Cherno More	Bulgaria	1	8	0
2005-06	Nesebar	Bulgaria	2	13	1
2006-07	Kaliakra	Bulgaria	2	23	2
2007-08	Minyor Pernik	Bulgaria	2	21	1
2008-09	Minyor Pernik	Bulgaria	1	18	1
2009-10	Minyor Pernik	Bulgaria	1	3	1
2009-10	Beroe	Bulgaria	1	11	0

== Honours ==
=== Club ===
- Beroe
  - Bulgarian Cup:
    - Winner: 2009-10
