= Iliyan Garov =

Bulgarian footballer

Personal information
- Full name: Iliyan Strahilov Garov
- Date of birth: 8 January 1984 (age 42)
- Place of birth: Plovdiv, Bulgaria
- Height: 1.84 m (6 ft 0 in)
- Position: Centre back

Team information
- Current team: Levski Karlovo

Youth career
- –2003: Lokomotiv Plovdiv

Senior career*
Years	Team	Apps	(Gls)
2003–2006	Lokomotiv Plovdiv	3	(0)
2004–2005	→ Vidima-Rakovski (loan)	?	(?)
2005–2006	→ Spartak Plovdiv (loan)	28	(3)
2006–2009	Botev Plovdiv	78	(3)
2009–2014	Lokomotiv Sofia	41	(1)
2014	Víkingur Reykjavík	3	(0)
2015	Marek Dupnitsa	10	(0)
2015	Septemvri Sofia	11	(0)
2016	Spartak Pleven	12	(0)
2016–2017	Oborishte	24	(0)
2017–2018	Arda	?	(?)
2018–2019	Gigant Saedinenie	?	(?)
2019–	Levski Karlovo	0	(0)
- * Club domestic league appearances and goals as of 31 May 2017

Iliyan Strahilov Garov (Bulgarian: Илиян Страхилов Гаров; born 8 January 1984 in Plovdiv) is a Bulgarian football played who plays defender for Levski Karlovo.

== Career ==
Garov started his career in city rival on Botev - Lokomotiv. As an 18-year-old he signed his first professional contract for three years with Lokomotiv. After that is loaned for along one year in Vidima-Rakovski Sevlievo and Spartak Plovdiv. In June 2006 he signed with Botev Plovdiv on a free transfer. He became captain of the team in 2008, succeeding Daniel Bozhkov. After the conclusion of the 2008/2009 season he was released from the club and joined Lokomotiv Sofia.

On 21 June 2017 he joined Third League club Arda Kardzhali. He left the club at the end of the season. In July 2018, Garov signed with Gigant Saedinenie.
