= Daniel Ajayi-Adeniran =

Nigerian pastor

- Born: Nigeria
- Church: Redeemed Christian Church of God
- Ordained: 1994
- Congregations served: Chapel of Restoration
- Title: Pastor

Daniel Ajayi-Adeniran is a Pentecostal pastor from Nigeria. As of 2011, he heads the expansion of the African-based Redeemed Christian Church of God in North America.

Ajayi-Adeniran experienced problems with alcohol, and in 1989 visited the Redeemed Christian Church of God across the street from his home near Ibadan. In 1990, he converted to the doctrines of the Redeemed Christian Church and was ordained through that denomination 1994. He moved to the United States in 1995 because of the political conditions under Sani Abacha in Nigeria. After arriving in the U.S., Ajayi-Adeniran became part of the first parish of the Redeemed Christian Church of God in North America located on Roosevelt Island. Soon after, he became the pastor of a newly formed branch of the church, meeting in a Bronx storefront.

A graduate of City University of New York, he is married to Pastor Atinuke Naomi Ajayi-Adeniran.

Ajayi-Adeniran states his goal is to inform others of the mission of the Redeemed Christian Church of God, so that in each household in the world there will be at least one member of the church.
