= Deniran =

Déníran
- Gender: Male
- Language: Yoruba

Origin
- Origin: Nigerian
- Meaning: The royal family has a known ancestry; The king (or head) has a vision; or My lineage has royalty.
- Region of origin: South West, Nigeria

Déníran is a Nigerian male given name and surname of Yoruba origin. It means "The royal family has a known ancestry; The king (or head) has a vision; or My lineage has royalty.". The name Déníran is a unique and culturally significant name and primarily used among the royal families or royal lineage. The diminutive form is Adéníran which is of the same meaning but in full form. Other shorter form is Niran.

== Notable Individuals with the Name ==
- Ortega Deniran (born 1986), Nigerian footballer.
- Victor Deniran (born 1990), Nigerian footballer, brother of Ortega.
