= Vasil Kochev =

Bulgarian footballer

Vasko Kochev
Personal information
- Full name: Vasko Ivanov Kochev
- Date of birth: 10 August 1988 (age 38)
- Place of birth: Plovdiv, Bulgaria
- Position: Midfielder

Team information
- Current team: Svilengrad 1921

Youth career
- –2008: Botev Plovdiv

Senior career*
Years	Team	Apps	(Gls)
2008–2009	Botev Plovdiv	17	(1)
2010	Chernomorets Balchik	9	(0)
2010	Maritsa Plovdiv	?	(?)
2011	Brestnik 1948	7	(1)
2011–	Svilengrad 1921	0	(0)
- * Club domestic league appearances and goals as of 1 August 2011

Vasko Kochev (Bulgarian: Васил Кочев; born 10 August 1988) is a Bulgarian professional footballer who currently plays for Svilengrad 1921 as a midfielder.

== Career ==
Son of Ivan Kochev, notable player of Botev, Vasko began his professional career during the 2008–09 season with Botev Plovdiv.
