= Yulian Levashki =

Bulgarian footballer

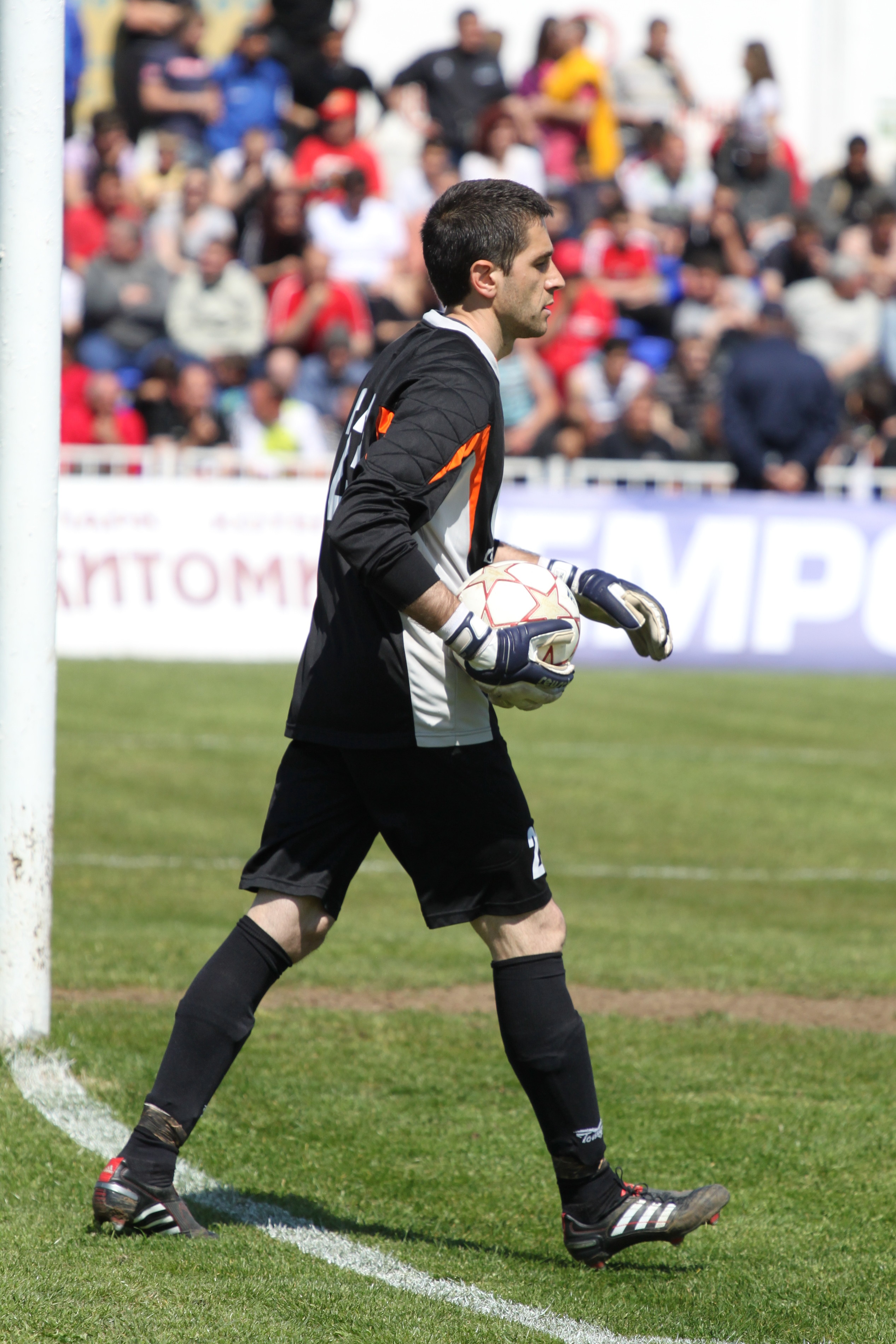

Personal information
- Date of birth: 2 March 1981 (age 45)
- Place of birth: Vratsa, Bulgaria
- Height: 1.87 m (6 ft 1 1/2 in)
- Position: Goalkeeper

Youth career
- Botev Vratsa

Senior career*
Years	Team	Apps	(Gls)
2000–2006	Botev Vratsa		
2007–2009	Lokomotiv Mezdra	25	(0)
2009–2010	Lokomotiv Sofia	14	(0)
2010–2011	Montana	7	(0)
2012–2013	Lokomotiv Mezdra	28	(0)
2014	FC Ursy	?	(?)
2014	Botev Vratsa	7	(0)
- * Club domestic league appearances and goals as of 8 December 2014

Yulian Levashki (Bulgarian: Юлиян Левашки) (born 2 March 1981) is a Bulgarian footballer who plays as a goalkeeper.

== Career ==
After spending the first six years of his career in home town Vratsa with local club Botev, in 2006 Levashki transferred to Lokomotiv Mezdra. On 16 July 2009 he signed a two-year contract with Lokomotiv Sofia. During his first season with the team, Levashki did not get much playing time, being second choice after Valentin Galev. The titular player's injury at the end of the 2009-2010 winter transfer window, however, made him a starter. Levashki began his stint with solid performances, conceding only 2 goals in his first three matches (his team scoring 9 goals at the same time).
