= Petko Vasilev =

Bulgarian footballer

Personal information
- Full name: Petko Vasilev Vasilev
- Date of birth: 16 January 1990 (age 36)
- Place of birth: Plovdiv, Bulgaria
- Height: 1.80 m (5 ft 11 in)
- Position: Forward

Senior career*
Years	Team	Apps	(Gls)
2008–2010	Botev Plovdiv	5	(0)
- * Club domestic league appearances and goals as of February 2010

Petko Vasilev Vasilev (Bulgarian: Петко Василев Василев) (born 16 January 1990 in Plovdiv) is a Bulgarian football player who played for Botev Plovdiv in the Bulgarian A PFG in the 2009–10 season, before that club suffered administrative relegation.
