= Radoslav Anev =

Bulgarian footballer

Personal information
- Full name: Radoslav Banchov Anev
- Date of birth: 1 February 1985 (age 41)
- Place of birth: Blagoevgrad, Bulgaria
- Height: 1.73 m (5 ft 8 in)
- Position: Midfielder

Youth career
- Pirin Blagoevgrad

Senior career*
Years	Team	Apps	(Gls)
2004–2005	Pirin Blagoevgrad	27	(1)
2005–2007	Lokomotiv Plovdiv	52	(0)
2008–2009	Slavia Sofia	15	(0)
2009	Lokomotiv Mezdra	13	(0)
2009	Pirin Blagoevgrad	13	(0)
2010	Pirin Gotse Delchev	12	(1)
2010–2011	Ludogorets Razgrad	19	(0)
2011–2012	Etar 1924	27	(2)
2013	Pirin Blagoevgrad	?	(?)
2013	Riccione 1929	5	(0)
2014	Virtus Castelfranco	11	(0)
2014–2015	Etar Veliko Tarnovo	16	(0)
2015	Botev Vratsa	14	(3)
2016	Etar Veliko Tarnovo	13	(0)
2016	Pirin Gotse Delchev		
2017	Bansko	8	(0)

International career
2005–2006	Bulgaria U21	5	(0)
- * Club domestic league appearances and goals as of 30 May 2017

Radoslav Anev (Bulgarian: Радослав Анев; born 1 February 1985 in Blagoevgrad) is a Bulgarian footballer, who plays as a midfielder.

He had previously played for Pirin Blagoevgrad, Lokomotiv Plovdiv, Slavia Sofia, Lokomotiv Mezdra, Ludogorets Razgrad, Etar 1924 and Pirin Gotse Delchev. On 23 February 2017, Anev joined Bansko but left the club at the end of the season.

== International career ==
Between 2005 and 2006 Anev was part of the Bulgaria national under-21 football team. For Bulgaria U21, he was capped 5 times.
