= Gustave Bahoken =

Cameroonian footballer

Personal information
- Full name: Gustave Baheten Bahoken
- Date of birth: 13 June 1979 (age 47)
- Place of birth: Douala, Cameroon
- Height: 1.78 m (5 ft 10 in)
- Position: Centre-back

Senior career*
Years	Team	Apps	(Gls)
1998–1999	Cotonsport Garoua	18	(0)
1999	FC Sion	7	(0)
1999	Le Havre B	10	(0)
2000	Le Havre AC	1	(0)
2000–2001	Valenciennes FC	22	(0)
2001–2002	FC Rouen	17	(2)
2002–2005	Livingston	33	(0)
2003–2004	→ Angers SCO (loan)	17	(0)
2005–2008	Aalesund	48	(1)
2009	Botev Plovdiv	4	(0)
2011	Persela Lamongan	0	(0)
2012	Mitra Kukar	6	(2)

International career
2003	Cameroon	2	(0)
- * Club domestic league appearances and goals

Gustave "Gus" Baheten Bahoken (born 13 June 1979) is a Cameroonian former professional footballer who played as a centre-back.

== Club career ==
Bahoken moved to Aalesund from the French team Angers SCO in 2005. Prior to playing for Angers, he had spent two seasons with Livingston in the Scottish Premier League.

Bahoken accidentally broke former Celtic striker Henrik Larsson's jaw at Celtic Park in an unfortunate head-to-head collision in a game in 2003.

In January 2009, he was given a trial at English League Two side Bradford City in a reserve game with Scunthorpe United.

== International career ==
Bahoken was part of the Cameroon national team at the 2004 African Nations Cup, which finished top of their group in the first round of competition, before losing in the quarter-finals to Nigeria. Bahoken was part of the Cameroonian squad that went all the way to the final in the FIFA Confederations Cup 2003 in France. He played only one full cap for Cameroon.

== Personal life ==
His younger brother Stéphane is also a footballer.

== Honours ==
Cotonsport Garoua

- Cameroonian Championship: 1998
