= Georgi Samokishev =

Bulgarian footballer

Personal information
- Full name: Georgi Todorov Samokishev
- Date of birth: 25 February 1987 (age 39)
- Place of birth: Gotse Delchev, Bulgaria
- Height: 1.87 m (6 ft 1 1/2 in)
- Position: Defender

Team information
- Current team: Pirin Gotse Delchev
- Number: 14

Youth career
- Pirin Blagoevgrad

Senior career*
Years	Team	Apps	(Gls)
2004–2005	Pirin Blagoevgrad	13	(0)
2005–2008	Lokomotiv Plovdiv	31	(1)
2008–2009	Slavia Sofia	16	(2)
2009	Pirin Blagoevgrad	0	(0)
2010	Pirin Gotse Delchev	14	(3)
2010–2011	Septemvri Simitli	31	(2)
2011–2012	Pirin Gotse Delchev	22	(3)
2013	Pirin Blagoevgrad	?	(?)
2014–	Pirin Gotse Delchev	2	(0)

International career
2006	Bulgaria U21	1	(0)
- * Club domestic league appearances and goals as of 22 April 2014

Georgi Samokishev (Bulgarian: Георги Самокишев; born 25 February 1987 in Gotse Delchev) is a Bulgarian football player who currently plays for Pirin Gotse Delchev. He is a reliable defender.

== Career ==
Samokishev was educated in Pirin's youth academy, and played 13 league games for the club before moving on to have lengthy spells with Lokomotiv Plovdiv and Slavia Sofia. On 25 August 2009, it was announced that Samokishev would return to Pirin in a week. A few days later, he signed a 2-year contract with Nevrokopchanlii.
