= Georgi Semerdzhiev =

Bulgarian footballer

- Born: Georgi Konstantinov Semerdzhiev; August 8, 1986 (age 40); Sofia, Bulgaria
- Occupation: Footballer
- Height: 1.80 m (5 ft 11 in)
- Status: In prison
- Criminal charges: Murder; drugs possession; conspiracy; corruption of minors
- Penalty: 20 years' imprisonment
Association football career
- Position: Forward
Youth career
- 1996–2005: Levski Sofia
Senior career*
| Years | Team | Apps | (Gls) |
| 2005–2006 | Hebar Pazardzhik | 9 | (5) |
| 2006–2007 | Vihren Sandanski | 23 | (5) |
| 2007–2008 | Rodopa Smolyan | 28 | (3) |
| 2009 | Botev Plovdiv | 3 | (0) |
| 2009–2011 | Sportist Svoge | 18 | (3) |
| Total | | 81 | (16) |
- * Club domestic league appearances and goals

Georgi Semerdzhiev (Bulgarian: Георги Семерджиев) (born 8 August 1986) is a former Bulgarian footballer, and a convicted criminal. He is currently serving 20 years in prison for double vehicular homicide.

== Criminal record ==
On July 5, 2022, in Sofia, Bulgaria, while on drugs, Semerdzhiev was going over the speed limit in a SUV with fake license plates and with no driver's license. He ran a red light, hitting a taxi and killing two women, aged 21 and 26, on the sidewalk. He fled the scene but was arrested on the next day in an apartment a few hundred meters from the car accident. Semerdzhiev has a criminal record. On the 21.04.23 the Sofia City Court sentenced him to 20 years in prison and 850k leva (425k €) fine. In 2020 he was also investigated for participating in an illegal sports betting scheme. There are also reports that he was involved in the distribution of drugs.
