= Ventsislav Velinov =

Bulgarian footballer

Personal information
- Full name: Ventsislav Georgiev Velinov
- Date of birth: 2 January 1981 (age 45)
- Place of birth: Sofia, Bulgaria
- Height: 1.89 m (6 ft 2 in)
- Position: Goalkeeper

Youth career
- CSKA Sofia

Senior career*
| Years | Team | Apps | (Gls) |
| 2000–2003 | CSKA Sofia | 1 | (0) |
| 2003–2004 | Conegliano | ? | (?) |
| 2005 | Marek | 2 | (0) |
| 2006–2007 | Vihren | 6 | (0) |
| 2007–2008 | Apollon Limassol | ? | (1) |
| 2008–2009 | CSKA Sofia | | |
| 2009–2010 | Botev Plovdiv | 8 | (0) |
| 2010 | Nesebar | 0 | (0) |
| 2011 | Dorostol | | |
- * Club domestic league appearances and goals

Ventsislav Georgiev Velinov (Bulgarian: Венцислав Георгиев Велинов; born 2 January 1981) is a Bulgarian former professional footballer. Velinov previously played for Vihren Sandanski and Marek Dupnitsa in the A PFG. He is the son of CSKA Sofia goalkeeper Georgi Velinov.

== Honours ==
CSKA Sofia

- Bulgarian Supercup: 2008
