= Petar Shopov =

Bulgarian footballer (born 1978)

Personal information
- Full name: Petar Ivanov Shopov
- Date of birth: 14 January 1978 (age 48)
- Place of birth: Bansko, Bulgaria
- Height: 1.86 m (6 ft 1 in)
- Position: Forward

Senior career*
Years	Team	Apps	(Gls)
1996–1997	Levski Sofia	0	(0)
1997–1998	Pirin Blagoevgrad	25	(10)
1998–1999	Levski Sofia	18	(4)
1999	Pirin Blagoevgrad	10	(1)
2000–2001	Slavia Sofia	35	(8)
2002–2003	Železnik	42	(12)
2004	Slavia Sofia	13	(1)
2004–2005	Mura	17	(2)
2005	Pirin 1922	12	(2)
2006	Kairat	11	(1)
2006–2008	Kastoria	29	(5)
2008	Digenis Morphou	14	(2)
2009	Anagennisi Karditsa	5	(0)
2009	Sportist Svoge	8	(1)
2010	Septemvri Simitli	14	(1)
2011–2012	Vihren	1	(0)

International career
- Bulgaria U21
- * Club domestic league appearances and goals

Petar Ivanov Shopov (Bulgarian: Петър Иванов Шопов; born 14 January 1978) is a Bulgarian former professional footballer who played as a forward.

== Career ==
Shopov started his career playing with Levski Sofia however during the 1996–97 season he only made one official appearance in the Cup being loaned in the next season to Pirin Blagoevgrad, where he scored 10 goals in 25 games and became top scorer of the team. Soon he had a chance back at the Bulgarian giants Levski but after one season he returned to his previous club on loan again. But he will be back to the capital, in January 2000, this time to play in Slavia Sofia where he stayed for two years. Shopov's first adventure abroad was in January 2002, when he signed with Yugoslav top league club FK Železnik. In two years, he scored 12 goals. After spending another season in Sofia with Slavia again, he signed with the Slovenian club NK Mura where he played one season before returning to his first professional club Pirin in 2005. In 2006, he had a short spell in Kazakhstan first league club FC Kairat, before moving to Greece to play first in Kastoria F.C., where he became top scorer of the team and then in Anagennisi Karditsa. In the middle he had a stint in Cyprus with Digenis Morphou. In the summer of 2009, Shopov returned to Bulgaria, signing a contract with Sportist Svoge. However, he left at the end of the year.

In 2010, Shopov signed a contract with West B PFG club Septemvri Simitli. He last played with Vihren in the West B PFG.
