= Vasil Vasilev (footballer, born 1984) =

Bulgarian footballer

Personal information
- Full name: Vasil Todorov Vasilev
- Date of birth: 13 October 1984 (age 42)
- Place of birth: Plovdiv, Bulgaria
- Height: 1.87 m (6 ft 2 in)
- Position: Centre back

Team information
- Current team: Eurocollege

Youth career
- 1995–2002: Botev Plovdiv

Senior career*
Years	Team	Apps	(Gls)
2002–2010	Botev Plovdiv	106	(1)
2010	Hebar Pazardzhik	12	(2)
2010–2012	Botev Plovdiv	24	(0)
2012–	Eurocollege	24	(1)
- * Club domestic league appearances and goals as of 1 August 2013

Vasil Vasilev (Bulgarian: Васил Василев; born 13 October 1984) is a Bulgarian football defender, who currently plays for FC Eurocollege. He is known as an affectionate Botev Plovdiv fan, having grown amongst the ultras as a younger kid.

== Career ==
Vasilev is a product of the Botev youth academy. On 16 August 2003, he made his debut for the first squad in a match against Belasitsa Petrich. In July 2009, he was given the captain's armband. After the club was administratively relegated from A PFG due to financial difficulties and a number of related issues, he signed with Bulgarian South-West V AFG team PFC Hebar Pazardzhik, where he recorded 12 matches and scored 2 goals. When Botev Plovdiv was revived in the summer of 2010, Vasilev returned to the club of his heart.

== Trivia ==
- Vasilev's nickname is "The Pillar" (Bulgarian: Стълба).
- Vasilev has numerous tattoos, one of which is of Hristo Botev - a Bulgarian national hero, after which the football club is named.

== Statistics ==
Updated 15 August 2010

Club	Season	Appearances	Goals
Botev Plovdiv	2003–04	23	0
Botev Plovdiv	2004–05	8	1
Botev Plovdiv	2005–06	13	0
Botev Plovdiv	2006–07	16	0
Botev Plovdiv	2007–08	18	0
Botev Plovdiv	2008–09	28	0
Botev Plovdiv	2009	7	0
Hebar Pazardzhik	2010	12	2
Botev Plovdiv	2010-11	1	0
Total	125	3	
