= Adriano Miranda =

Brazilian footballer (born 1989)

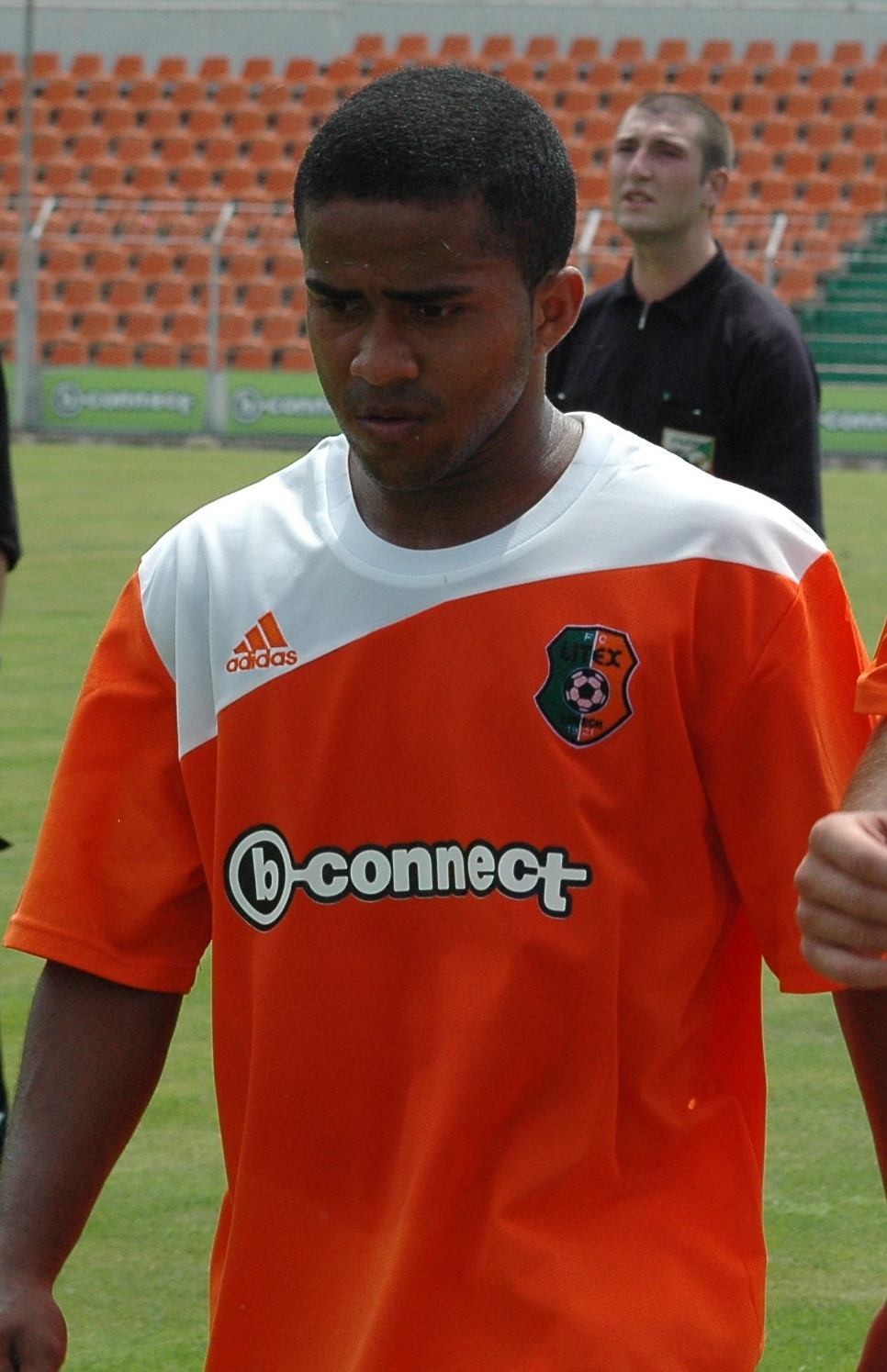

Personal information
- Full name: Adriano Miranda de Carvalho
- Date of birth: 22 June 1989 (age 37)
- Place of birth: Belém, Brazil
- Height: 1.65 m (5 ft 5 in)
- Position: Attacking midfielder

Youth career
- 2006: Clube do Remo

Senior career*
Years	Team	Apps	(Gls)
2006–2007	Clube do Remo	5	(0)
2007–2010	Litex Lovech	8	(2)
2008	→ FK Pelister (loan)	27	(6)
2009	→ Spartak Varna (loan)	13	(2)
2010	Sliven 2000	28	(1)
2011	Tuna Luso		
2011	→ AA Goiatuba (loan)		
2011–2012	São Raimundo	3	(0)
2012–2013	Paragominas	8	(1)
2013	Tuna Luso		
2014	Vênus-AC		
2015	Tapajós		
- * Club domestic league appearances and goals

Adriano Miranda de Carvalho (born 22 June 1989), known as Adriano Miranda, is a Brazilian former professional footballer who played as an attacking midfielder.

== Career ==
In 2006, Adriano Miranda participated in the Copa da Juventude, a tournament arranged by a radio and television network in his home town Belém. Miranda, being the star of the competition, was contracted by the local team Clube do Remo. He won the Campeonato Paraense 2007 with this team.

At the beginning of 2008, he signed with the Bulgarian side Litex Lovech but left immediately on loan to Pelister playing in the Macedonian First League. On 26 April 2008, he scored a hat-trick against Pelister's greatest rivals FK Vardar bringing the first victory for his team in Skopje after eight years, gaining great popularity in Bitola. Miranda was one of the best players for Pelister in the 2007–08 season when they finished third on the table. In August 2008, Mirsad Jonuz, the head coach of the Macedonian's national under-21 football team wanted to see this young player wear the Macedonian's jersey. If he agreed, a procedure would be started so he could get a Macedonian passport. On 22 December 2008, Miranda was named the Best foreign footballer in the Macedonian championship.

In the winter of 2009, he was invited by Bulgarian side Spartak Varna to join a trial period, which began on 12 January. On 17th Miranda signed with Spartak on loan until the end of 2008–09 season. On 8 March 2009, he made his debut in Bulgarian A PFG in a match against Lokomotiv Mezdra. In this match Miranda his first goal in Bulgaria. In June 2009 he returned to Litex Lovech, but however, in early 2010 was sold to OFC Sliven 2000. Miranda left the team from Sliven after the end of the first half of the 2010–11 season and in late January 2011 he signed a contract with Brazilian club Tuna Luso.

== Honours ==
- Campeonato Paraense: 2007
- Best foreign footballer in Macedonian First League: 2008
