= Zdravko Stankov =

Bulgarian footballer

Personal information
- Full name: Zdravko Borisov Stankov
- Date of birth: 4 January 1977 (age 49)
- Place of birth: Sofia, Bulgaria
- Height: 1.82 m (5 ft 11 1/2 in)
- Position: Left back

Youth career
- CSKA Sofia

Senior career*
Years	Team	Apps	(Gls)
1999–2001	Lokomotiv Plovdiv	27	(6)
2000–2001	Cherno More	20	(0)
2003	Lokomotiv Plovdiv	1	(0)
2003–2004	Makedonska slava	29	(0)
2004	Marek Dupnitsa	15	(0)
2005	Belasitsa Petrich	15	(1)
2007	Minyor Pernik	1	(0)
2007–2008	Rodopa Smolyan	24	(0)
2009	Botev Plovdiv	10	(0)
2009–2010	Lokomotiv Mezdra	16	(0)
2010–2014	Vidima-Rakovski	11	(0)
2014–2021	Manastirishte 2000		
2021–2022	Kostinbrod		
- * Club domestic league appearances and goals as of 1 January 2011

Zdravko Stankov (Bulgarian: Здравко Станков; born 4 January 1977) is a former Bulgarian footballer who played as a defender.
