= Fabio Tinazzi =

Italian footballer

Personal information
- Date of birth: 1 January 1983 (age 43)
- Place of birth: Rome, Italy
- Height: 1.80 m (5 ft 11 in)
- Position: Right-back

Youth career
- Roma

Senior career*
Years	Team	Apps	(Gls)
2002–2004	Reggiana	16	(0)
2003–2004	→ Treviso (loan)	3	(0)
2004–2005	Fermana	12	(0)
2005	→ Grosseto (loan)	2	(0)
2005–2006	Fermana	14	(0)
2006–2009	Sambenedettese	90	(0)
2009	Botev Plovdiv	10	(0)
2010	Sporting Terni	8	(3)
2010–2011	Perugia	3	(0)
- * Club domestic league appearances and goals

Fabio Tinazzi (born 1 January 1983) is an Italian footballer.

== Career ==
Tinazzi played 134 matches in Serie C with Reggiana, Fermana, Grosseto and Sambenedettese and 3 matches in Serie B with Treviso, before in September 2009 moved to Bulgaria, signing a contract with Botev Plovdiv. He made his competitive debut for Botev on 20 September 2009 against Litex Lovech in the sixth round of the A PFG and joined in January 2010 to Serie D club A.S.D. Sporting Terni.
