= Nikolay Harizanov =

Bulgarian footballer

Personal information
- Full name: Nikolay Ivanov Harizanov
- Date of birth: 14 June 1983 (age 43)
- Place of birth: Byala, Bulgaria
- Height: 1.82 m (6 ft 0 in)
- Position: Defender

Team information
- Current team: Eurocollege

Youth career
- Hebar Pazardzhik

Senior career*
Years	Team	Apps	(Gls)
2002–2003	Hebar Pazardzhik	16	(1)
2003–2004	Chepinets Velingrad	28	(3)
2004–2005	Hebar Pazardzhik	31	(4)
2005	Slavia Sofia	7	(0)
2006	Vidima-Rakovski	11	(1)
2006–2007	Beroe Stara Zagora	29	(0)
2008–2009	Botev Plovdiv	32	(0)
2009	Sportist Svoge	7	(0)
2010	Minyor Pernik	8	(0)
2010–	Eurocollege	0	(0)
- * Club domestic league appearances and goals as of 30 June 2010

Nikolay Harizanov (Bulgarian Cyrillic: Николай Харизанов; born 14 June 1983) is a Bulgarian footballer who currently plays as a defender for FC Eurocollege.

== Career ==
Nikolay Harizanov started his career in PFC Hebar Pazardzhik. After that played for FC Chepinets, Slavia Sofia, Vidima-Rakovski and Beroe Stara Zagora. He came to PFC Botev Plovdiv on a free transfer in early 2008.

=== Botev Plovdiv ===
Harizanov made his official debut for Botev in a match against Spartak Varna on 1 March 2008. He played for 90 minutes. The result of the match was 2:0 with win for Botev. In season 2008–09, Harizanov earned 17 appearances playing in the A PFG.

=== Sportist ===
On 31 July 2009 Harizanov terminated his contract with Botev Plovdiv and a few days later signed with Sportist Svoge for two years. He remained part of the Svoge squad until late October 2009.
