= Lilcho Arsov =

Bulgarian footballer

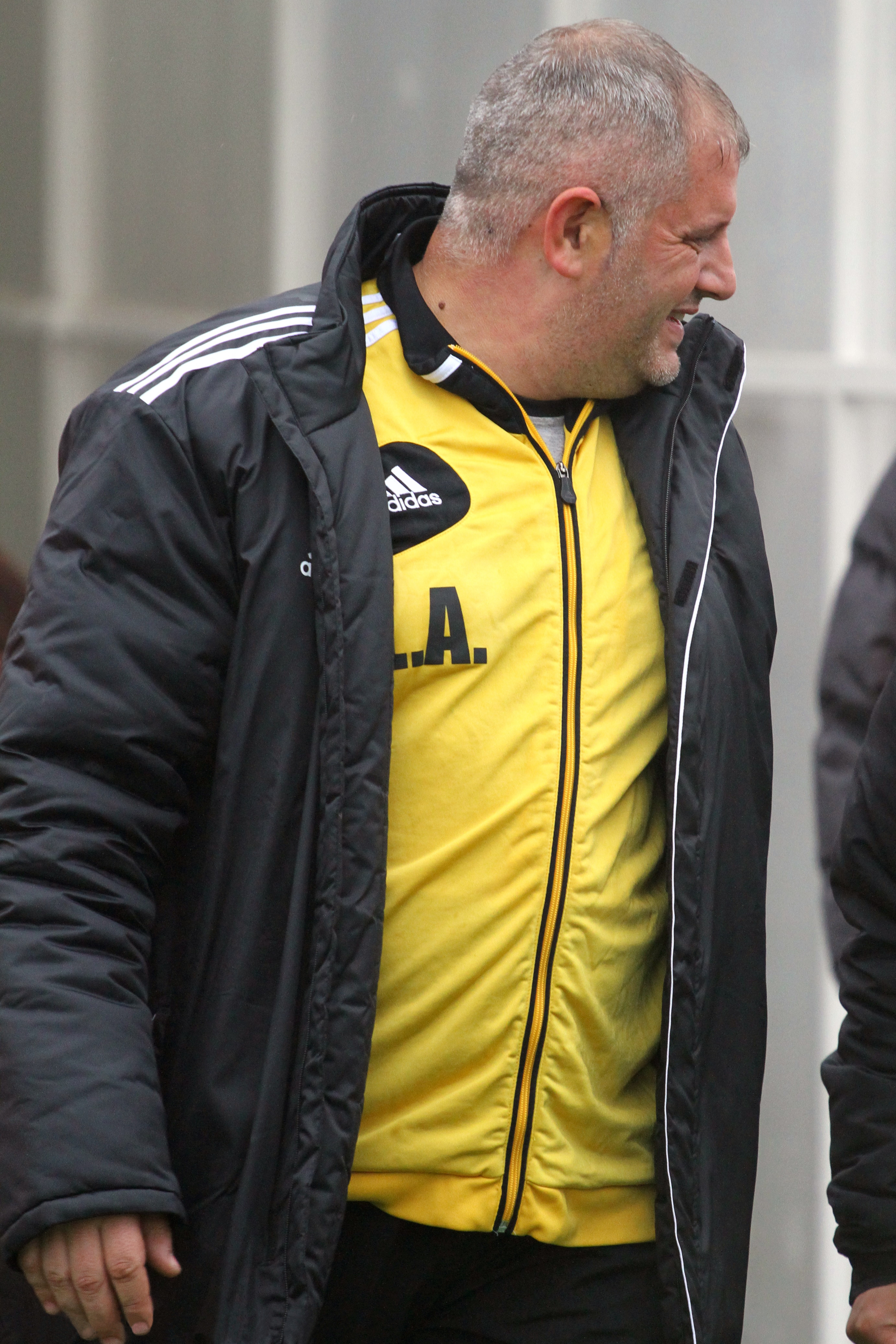

Personal information
- Full name: Lilcho Ivanov Arsov
- Date of birth: 16 October 1972 (age 54)
- Place of birth: Plovdiv, Bulgaria
- Height: 1.97 m (6 ft 6 in)
- Position: Goalkeeper

Youth career
- Botev Plovdiv

Senior career*
Years	Team	Apps	(Gls)
1991–1994	Chirpan		
1994–1998	Botev Plovdiv	61	(0)
1998–1999	Lokomotiv Plovdiv	12	(0)
1999–2001	Sokol Komatevo		
2001–2002	Spartak Plovdiv	23	(0)
2002–2008	Botev Plovdiv	156	(0)
2008	Rodopa Smolyan	7	(0)
2009	Botev Plovdiv	5	(0)
- * Club domestic league appearances and goals

Lilcho Ivanov Arsov (Bulgarian: Лилчо Иванов Арсов; born 16 October 1972) is a former Bulgarian football goalkeeper, who is currently coach at PFC Botev Plovdiv and scout for Ludogorets Razgrad.

Arsov previously played for PFC Botev Plovdiv in the A PFG. A fan favourite, despite his large frame, Arsov was known for his quick reflexes.
