= Igor Tasković =

Serbian footballer

Personal information
- Full name: Igor Tasković
- Date of birth: 4 January 1982 (age 44)
- Place of birth: Niš, SFR Yugoslavia
- Height: 1.78 m (5 ft 10 in)
- Position: Midfielder

Youth career
- Radnički Niš

Senior career*
| Years | Team | Apps | (Gls) |
| 2000–2001 | Radnički Niš | 0 | (0) |
| 2001–2004 | Obilić | 19 | (1) |
| 2003 | → Mladi Obilić (loan) | 8 | (2) |
| 2004 | Radnički Niš | 16 | (2) |
| 2004–2006 | Bregalnica Štip | 47 | (1) |
| 2006-2007 | Železničar Niš | 11 | (5) |
| 2007–2009 | Marek Dupnitsa | 55 | (2) |
| 2008 | → Jezero (loan) | 12 | (3) |
| 2009 | Beroe Stara Zagora | 0 | (0) |
| 2010 | Montana | 4 | (0) |
| 2010–2011 | Napredak Kruševac | 10 | (1) |
| 2011–2012 | Black Stars Basel | 25 | (5) |
| 2013–2015 | Víkingur | 61 | (11) |
| 2015–2016 | Türk Gücü Landau | 0 | (0) |
| 2016 | Víkingur | 20 | (0) |
| 2016–2017 | Türk Spor Landau | 0 | (0) |
| 2017 | Fjölnir | 7 | (0) |
| 2017 | Reynir | 6 | (0) |
| 2017–2018 | SV Thürnthenning | 8 | (1) |
| 2018–2020 | Türk Gücü Dingolfing | 24 | (3) |
| 2020–2021 | SV Thürnthenning | 3 | (1) |
| 2021–2023 | Türk Gücü Dingolfing | 12 | (4) |

Managerial career
- 2018–2019: Türk Gücü Dingolfing (player-coach)
- 2022-: Türk Gücü Dingolfing (player-coach)
- * Club domestic league appearances and goals as of 12:06, 27 February 2021 (UTC)

Igor Tasković (Serbian Cyrillic: Игор Тасковић; born 4 January 1982) is a Serbian footballer who plays for German club SV Thürnthenning.

== Career ==
Educated in Radnički's academy, Tasković played 21 league games with them before moving to FK Obilić in 2003.

He joined Makedonska Prva Liga club FK Bregalnica Štip in July 2004 for an undisclosed fee. Tasković quickly became part of the main team. While at Bregalnica, Tasković became linked with all two main Macedonian outfits (FK Vardar and Makedonija Gjorče Petrov), but decided to play for Bulgarian FC Marek Dupnitsa, signing a two-a-half-year contract after the half of 2006–07 season.

In 2008, he was loaned for six months in Montenegrin FK Jezero before joining PFC Beroe Stara Zagora on 1 July 2009 from FC Marek Dupnitsa. After a brief spell with PFC Montana in 2010, Tasković moved to FK Napredak Kruševac and played with FC Black Stars Basel in Switzerland before joining Víkingur Reykjavík in February 2013.
