= Marco Di Paolo =

Italian professional footballer

Personal information
- Date of birth: 5 November 1986 (age 39)
- Place of birth: San Benedetto del Tronto, Italy
- Height: 1.91 m (6 ft 3 in)
- Position: Defender

Youth career
- Fermana
- Ascoli
- 2003–2004: Giulianova

Senior career*
Years	Team	Apps	(Gls)
2004–2005	Giulianova	0	(10)
2005–2006	Grottamare	5	(0)
2006–2008	Martinsicuro		
2008–2009	Fermana	8	(0)
2009–2010	Botev Plovdiv	3	(0)
2011–2011	Cannara		
2011–2012	Martinsicuro		
2012–2013	Vigevano		
2013	Grottamare	1	(0)
2013–2015	Martinsicuro	44	(3)
2015–2016	Palmense		
2017–2018	Centoprandonese		
2017–2018	Atletico Piceno		
- * Club domestic league appearances and goals

Marco Di Paolo (born 5 November 1986) is an Italian professional footballer who last played as a defender for Atletico Piceno.

Born in San Benedetto del Tronto, in his youth Di Paolo played for Fermana, Ascoli, and Giulianova.

In his senior career, Marco Di Paolo has played for, among others, Botev Plovdiv (in the top flight of Bulgarian football), Martinsicuro, Vigevano, and Fermana.
