= Ivan Terziyski =

Bulgarian footballer

Personal information
- Date of birth: 6 December 1980 (age 45)
- Place of birth: Sofia, Bulgaria
- Height: 1.83 m (6 ft 0 in)
- Position: Midfielder

Youth career
- CSKA Sofia

Senior career*
Years	Team	Apps	(Gls)
1999–2004	Akademik Svishtov	108	(4)
2004–2005	FC Vihar	22	(2)
2005–2006	Conegliano	8	(1)
2006–2007	Minyor	11	(0)
2007–	Sportist	30	(0)
- * Club domestic league appearances and goals as of 17 June 2009

Ivan Terziyski (Bulgarian: Иван Терзийски) (born 6 December 1980) is a Bulgarian footballer who plays as a midfielder.

Terziyski began his footballing career with CSKA Sofia youth team, where in 1998 was a team-mate with Dimitar Berbatov. Terziyski was a captain of the youth team, before moved to Akademik Svishtov in 1999. He also played for Vihar Gorublyane, Conegliano and Minyor Pernik. In 2007 Terziyski signed with Sportist Svoge.
