= Marco D'Argenio =

Italian footballer

Personal information
- Date of birth: June 30, 1984 (age 42)
- Place of birth: Avellino, Italy
- Height: 1.81 m (5 ft 11 1/2 in)
- Position: Centre back

Team information
- Current team: FC Maritsa Plovdiv
- Number: 3

Senior career*
Years	Team	Apps	(Gls)
2003–2004	Jesina	14	(0)
2005–2006	Fano	11	(0)
2006–2007	FC Mendrisio-Stabio	12	(0)
2007–2008	Pro Vasto	8	(0)
Nov 2008	Torgiano	16	(0)
2009–2010	Botev Plovdiv	6	(0)
2010–2011	Acri	10	(0)
2011–2012	Gigant Saedinenie		
2014	FC Maritsa Plovdiv		
- * Club domestic league appearances and goals as of January 22, 2010

Marco D'Argenio (born 30 June 1984 in Avellino) is an Italian football player, who currently plays for FC Maritsa Plovdiv, in the Bulgarian 3rd division.

== Career ==
After spending the first seven years of his career in his home country with Fano Calcio, Jesina, F.C. Pro Vasto and A.C.D. Torgiano, D'Argenio relocated to Bulgaria in September 2009. He signed a two-year contract with Botev Plovdiv on 7 September. D'Argenio made his competitive debut for Botev on 20 September 2009 against Litex Lovech in the sixth round of the A PFG.
