= Martin Kerchev =

Bulgarian footballer

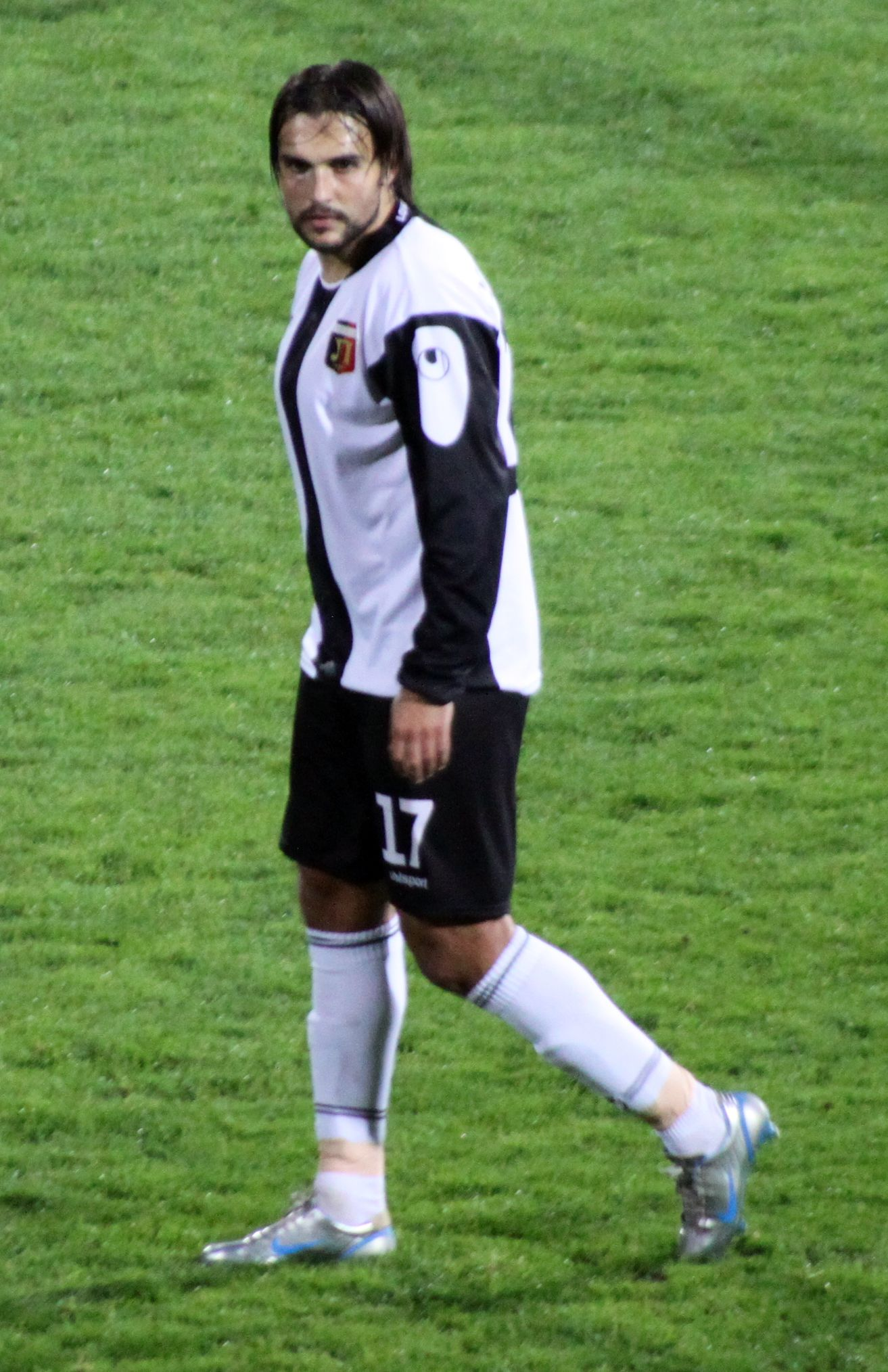

Personal information
- Full name: Martin Kirilov Kerchev
- Date of birth: 22 October 1982 (age 44)
- Place of birth: Русе Bulgaria
- Height: 1.77 m (5 ft 10 in)
- Position: Midfielder

Team information
- Current team: Hebar Pazardzhik
- Number: 17

Youth career
- Раковски Русе: Локомотив Русе

Senior career*
Years	Team	Apps	(Gls)
1999–2001	Lokomotiv Ruse	32	(7)
2001	Локомотив Русе	22	(6)
2002	Локомотив Русе	16	(1)
2002–2003	Spartak Varna	12	(4)
2003	CSKA Sofia	12	(1)
2004	Vidima-Rakovski	19	(4)
2005–2009	Slavia Sofia	87	(14)
2009	Cherno More	12	(0)
2010	Lokomotiv Mezdra	15	(4)
2010	Lokomotiv Plovdiv	12	(0)
2011	Turan Tovuz	12	(0)
2012	Bdin Vidin	8	(0)
2012–2014	Dunav Ruse	0	(0)
2016–	Hebar Pazardzhik	2	(0)

International career
2002	Bulgaria U21	1	(0)
- * Club domestic league appearances and goals as of 12 September 2012

Martin Kerchev (Bulgarian: Мартин Керчев; born 22 October 1982) is a Bulgarian football midfielder who plays for Hebar Pazardzhik.

== International career ==
In 2002 Kerchev played once for Bulgaria national under-21 football team.
