= FC Chepinets Velingrad =

Bulgarian football club

Chepinets
- Full name: Football Club Chepinets Velingrad
- Founded: 1926; 100 years ago
- Ground: Chepinets Stadium
- Capacity: 8,000
- Chairman: Miroslav Milev
- Manager: Stefan Karamanov
- League: A RFG Pazardzhik
- 2025–26: A RFG Pazardzhik, 9th
Home colours	Away colours

Football Club Chepinets (Bulgarian: Футболен клуб Чепинец) is a Bulgarian football club based in Velingrad, currently playing in the A RFG Pazardzhik.

The club colours are red and blue, and their home ground since 1961 has been Chepinets Stadium.

== History ==
Chepinets was founded in 1926. At the end of the 1956 season Chepinets reached the second tier of Bulgarian football for the first time in their history. In 1977–78 season Chepinets reached the Bulgarian Cup semi-finals, their best run in the competition, eliminating A Group sides Sliven and Levski Sofia along the way. In the following season they finished 3rd in the B Group, their highest ever league finish.

== Current squad ==
As of August 2, 2017

Note: Flags indicate national team as defined under FIFA eligibility rules; some limited exceptions apply. Players may hold more than one non-FIFA nationality.

No.	Pos.	Nation	Player
1	GK	BUL	Iliyan Bradvarov
2	DF	BUL	Silvestar Atanasov
4	DF	BUL	Petar Petrov
5	DF	BUL	Martin Kostov
6	MF	BUL	Nikolay Bayrakov (captain)
7	MF	BUL	Ignat Damyanov
8	MF	BUL	Deyan Kostadinov
9	FW	BUL	Hristo Stalev
10	MF	BUL	Alek Manolov
11	MF	BUL	Iliyan Genov
12	GK	BUL	Iliyan Georgiev

No.	Pos.	Nation	Player
14	MF	BUL	Bozhidar Petelov
15	DF	BUL	Deivid Penchev
16	MF	BUL	Margarit Georgiev
18	FW	BUL	Asparuh Vasilev
19	DF	BUL	Nikolay Ivanikov
20	MF	BUL	Slaviyan Kostadinov
21	DF	BUL	Iliya Ivanov
22	FW	BUL	Aleksandar Vuchkov
—	DF	BUL	Angel Zahariev
—	MF	BUL	Nikolay Velkov
