= Alan Carlet =

Italian football player (born 1977)

Personal information
- Date of birth: 12 January 1977 (age 49)
- Place of birth: Grosseto, Italy
- Height: 1.88 m (6 ft 2 in)
- Position: Left winger

Senior career*
Years	Team	Apps	(Gls)
–1996	Pievigina Calcio	29	(15)
1996–1997	Cagliari	1	(0)
1997–1998	Fermana	2	(0)
1998	Maceratese	12	(3)
1998–1999	A.S.D. Stuoie Baracca Lugo	21	(2)
1999	Pro Vercelli	8	(0)
1999–2001	Spezia	41	(14)
2001	L'Aquila	12	(1)
2001–2002	AlzanoCene	9	(0)
2002–2003	Pro Sesto	23	(8)
2003–2005	Novara	46	(5)
2005	Pistoiese	11	(1)
2005–2007	Reggiana	39	(5)
2007	Pisa	2	(0)
2007–2008	Torres	23	(1)
2008–2009	Castellana	26	(12)
2009	Botev Plovdiv	9	(0)
2010	Sporting Terni	7	(0)
2010–2011	SolbiaSommese	12	(1)
2011–	A.S.D. Vimercatese Oreno		
- * Club domestic league appearances and goals as of 23 July 2011

Alan Carlet (born 12 January 1977) is an Italian former football player who last played for A.S.D. Vimercatese Oreno as a forward.
