= ACD Torgiano =

Italian football club

Torgiano
- Full name: Associazione Calcio Dilettantistica; Torgiano
- Nickname(s): –
- Founded: 1945
- Ground: Stadio F. Braca, Torgiano, Italy
- Chairman: Mario Mincigrucci
- League: Promozione Umbria
- 2006–07: Eccellenza Umbria, 3rd
Home colours	Away colours

Associazione Calcio Dilettantistica Torgiano is an Italian association football club located in Torgiano, Umbria. It currently plays in Promozione Umbria. Its colors are yellow and blue.
