= Georgi Avramov =

Bulgarian footballer

Personal information
- Full name: Georgi Avramov Avramov
- Date of birth: 5 October 1983 (age 43)
- Place of birth: Plovdiv, Bulgaria
- Date of death: 19 August 2024
- Height: 1.78 m (5 ft 10 in)
- Position: Midfielder

Senior career*
Years	Team	Apps	(Gls)
2002–2009	Botev Plovdiv	107	(8)
2009	Spartak Plovdiv	11	(4)
2010	Cherno More	3	(0)
2010–2012	Montana	16	(1)
2012–2013	Rakovski	18	(1)
- * Club domestic league appearances and goals as of 2 June 2013

Georgi Avramov (Bulgarian: Георги Аврамов; born 5 October 1983) is a Bulgarian footballer who plays as a midfielder.

== Career ==
Avramov began his career with Botev Plovdiv and graduated to their first team at the age of 18 during the 2002–03 season. On 17 May 2003, he made his league debut in a match against CSKA Sofia. Avramov substituted Georgi Andonov in the first half and played for 69 minutes. The result of the match was a 0–2 loss for Botev. On April 10, 2005, Avramov scored his first goal against Chernomorets Burgas in a match from the Bulgarian second division. He scored in the 47th minute. In the mid-2009 Avramov signed with Spartak Plovdiv.
