= Hristo Stalev =

Bulgarian footballer

Personal information
- Date of birth: 11 July 1985 (age 41)
- Place of birth: Plovdiv, Bulgaria
- Height: 1.82 m (5 ft 11 1/2 in)
- Position: Midfielder

Team information
- Current team: Chepinets Velingrad

Senior career*
Years	Team	Apps	(Gls)
2006–2007	Spartak Plovdiv	15	(0)
2007–2008	Pirin Gotse Delchev	24	(4)
2008–2009	Svilengrad	19	(5)
2009	Botev Plovdiv		
2010	Dunav Ruse		
2010–	Chepinets Velingrad		
- * Club domestic league appearances and goals as of 22 June 2011

Hristo Stalev (born 11 July 1985 in Plovdiv) is a Bulgarian football player. He currently plays for Chepinets Velingrad as a forward.
