= Ciro Sirignano =

Italian footballer (born 1985)

Personal information
- Full name: Ciro Oreste Sirignano
- Date of birth: 1 October 1985 (age 41)
- Place of birth: Pomigliano d'Arco, Italy
- Height: 1.81 m (5 ft 11 1/2 in)
- Position: Left-back

Team information
- Current team: Albalonga

Youth career
- –2004: Avellino

Senior career*
Years	Team	Apps	(Gls)
2004–2008	Avellino	27	(0)
2004–2005	→ Solofra (loan)	32	(0)
2005–2006	→ Giugliano (loan)	16	(0)
2009	Sambenedettese	14	(1)
2009	Botev Plovdiv	10	(0)
2010	Rieti	5	(0)
2010–2011	Cavese	26	(0)
2011–2013	Catanzaro	43	(2)
2013–2014	Gavorrano	16	(1)
2014–2015	Ischia	35	(3)
2015–2016	Martina Franca	11	(0)
2016	Paganese	16	(1)
2016–2018	Santarcangelo	68	(4)
2018–2020	Virtus Verona	45	(1)
2020–2021	Paganese	24	(0)
2021–2022	Lamezia Terme	26	(1)
2022–2023	Vis Artena	32	(2)
2023–2025	Anzio	64	(6)
2025–	Albalonga	11	(0)
- * Club domestic league appearances and goals as of 1 March 2026

Ciro Oreste Sirignano (born 1 October 1985) is an Italian football player who plays as a defender for Serie D club Albalonga.

== Club career ==
On 1 September 2020, he returned to Paganese.

On 1 September 2021, he moved to Lamezia Terme in Serie D.
