= Sebastián Flores =

Uruguayan footballer (born 1983)

Personal information
- Full name: Sebastián Nicolás Flores Stefanovich
- Date of birth: 9 September 1983 (age 43)
- Place of birth: Montevideo, Uruguay
- Height: 1.80 m (5 ft 11 in)
- Position: Left-back

Youth career
- 1995–1998: Peñarol
- 1998–2002: Bella Vista

Senior career*
Years	Team	Apps	(Gls)
2002–2005	Bella Vista	33	(3)
2005–2006	Salernitana		
2006–2007	Aris Thessaloniki	11	(1)
2007–2008	CD Cobeña	12	(2)
2008–2009	Cherno More	0	(0)
2009–2010	Botev Plovdiv	9	(0)
2010–2011	Aris Limassol (loan)		
2011–2012	Rentistas	16	(3)
2012–2013	CA Torque	36	(5)
2013–2015	Huracán FC	35	(2)
2015–2016	Rampla Juniors	12	(0)
2016–2018	Central Español	29	(0)
- * Club domestic league appearances and goals

Sebastián Nicolás Flores Stefanovich (born 9 September 1983) is a Uruguayan former professional footballer who played as a left-back.

== Career ==
Sebastián Flores began his career at C.A. Peñarol, a club known for its long history and success in Uruguay. He later went on to incorporate himself in C.A. Bella Vista, a team that had been regulated to the First Division of the Uruguay League. It was at that point he declared himself a professional footballer in 2002. Three years later he would achieve the "Apertura" championship of the Second Division in June 2005 as well as the Uruguayan Championship, which allowed the team to be promoted back into the First Division.

Sebastian Flores was transferred to Salernitana Calcio of the Italian League.

He would later sign with Aris Thessaloniki, a club in which he would obtain a promotion to the First Division of the Greek national league, which later qualified for the prestigious UEFA Cup. After going through the Greek League, Sebastian would sign with CD Cobeña, which reached the Second Division of the Spanish soccer league.

Flores would finally sign with the club Cherno More Varna, which competes in the competitive First Division of the Bulgarian Soccer League. In June 2009, Sebastian assisted the club in their classification towards the UEFA Cup, as well as achieving the bronze title in the Bulgarian League. After a season with Cherno More, he signed with Botev Plovdiv, a team in the First Division of the Bulgarian Soccer League.

In 2011, after a long passage through European football, Flores returned to Uruguay to play in the Rentistas team from the first division of Uruguay. In September 2012, after finishing the contract with Rentistas, he signed with CA Torque professional football team from Uruguay, intentions team in his first year as a professional, searching for a promotion to the first division. They lost by penalty definition the final for promotion. After a good season with four scores, the captain of CA Torque signed a contract with Huracán FC.

In 2016, he was transferred to Rampla Juniors and after a season was champion of the Apertura championship second division and Uruguayan champion. Just losing a single game of all disputed and returning a Historic Rampla to the Privilege Divisional. After so many achievements he was called and seduced by an institutional project of the Central Español FC. That in less than a year and a half, almost achieved consecrating, with an advantage of ten points over the second and defence with fewer goals against, but was delayed by an injury.

== Personal life ==
In September 2005, Flores received an Italian citizenship.
