= Daniel Bozhkov =

Bulgarian footballer (born 1983)

Personal information
- Full name: Daniel Angelov Bozhkov
- Date of birth: 27 April 1983 (age 43)
- Place of birth: Plovdiv, Bulgaria
- Height: 1.74 m (5 ft 9 in)
- Position: Defender

Youth career
- Botev Plovdiv

Senior career*
Years	Team	Apps	(Gls)
2001–2009	Botev Plovdiv	183	(1)
2009–2011	Widzew Łódź	2	(0)
2010–2011	→ Górnik Łęczna (loan)	19	(0)
2011–2012	Botev Plovdiv	3	(0)
2012–2013	Rakovski	17	(0)
2013	Botev Vratsa	4	(0)
2014	Eurocollege		

International career
2005–2006	Bulgaria	3	(0)
- * Club domestic league appearances and goals

Daniel Bozhkov (Bulgarian: Даниел Ангелов Божков; born 27 April 1983) is a Bulgarian former professional footballer who played as a defender.

== Career ==
=== Club ===
Bozhkov has been raised in Botev Plovdiv's youth teams and was the team's captain. He made his official debut in top division of Bulgarian football in a match against Slavia Sofia on 30 August 2002; Bozhkov played 90 minutes in a 1–4 loss.

On 22 July 2009, Bozhkov signed a three-year contract with Widzew Łódź. In July 2011, he was loaned to Górnik Łęczna on a one-year deal. He returned to Widzew one year later.

=== Statistics ===
Season	Team	Football Group	Matches	Goals
2002-03	Botev	A PFG	18	0
2003-04	Botev	A PFG	25	0
2004-05	Botev	B PFG	26	0
2005-06	Botev	A PFG	26	0
2006-07	Botev	A PFG	25	0
2007-08	Botev	A PFG	30	1
2008-09	Botev	A PFG	29	0
2009-10	Widzew	I liga	2	0
2010-11	Górnik	I liga	4	0

== International career ==
In 2005 and 2006, while Hristo Stoichkov was manager of the Bulgarian national team, Bozhkov appeared in three matches. Daniel made his official debut for Bulgaria playing 90 minutes in a 6–2 win over Georgia on 12 November 2005.

Daniel Bozhkov: International Matches
#	Date	Venue	Opponent	Result	Competition
1.	12 November 2005	Sofia, Bulgaria	Georgia	6–2 (win)	Friendly
2.	16 November 2005	Houston, United States	Mexico	0–3 (win)	Friendly
3.	1 March 2006	Skopje, Macedonia	Macedonia	0–1 (win)	Friendly

== Honours ==
Widzew Łódź

- I liga: 2009–10
