= Massimiliano Brizzi =

Italian footballer

Personal information
- Date of birth: February 13, 1975 (age 51)
- Place of birth: Legnano, Italy
- Height: 1.78 m (5 ft 10 in)
- Position: Defensive midfielder

Senior career*
Years	Team	Apps	(Gls)
1994–1995	Meda	29	(4)
1995–1997	Pro Patria	61	(9)
1997–1998	Como	29	(2)
1998–2000	Lumezzane	43	(2)
2000–2009	Novara	223	(15)
2009	Botev Plovdiv	9	(0)
2010–2011	Cynthia 1920	38	(3)
2011	Gallaratese	15	(0)
2012	Derthona 1908	16	(0)
2012–2013	Borgomanero	25	(1)
- * Club domestic league appearances and goals

Massimiliano Brizzi (born 13 February 1975 in Legnano) is a former Italian footballer who played as a midfielder.

== Career ==
Brizzi played in his country for A.C. Meda 1913, Aurora Pro Patria 1919, Calcio Como, A.C. Lumezzane and Novara Calcio, before in September 2009 moved to Bulgaria, signing a contract with Botev Plovdiv. He made his competitive debut for Botev on 20 September 2009 against Litex Lovech in the sixth round of the A PFG and temporarily retired in January 2010.
