= Emanuele Morini =

Italian footballer (born 1982)

Personal information
- Full name: Emanuele Morini
- Date of birth: 31 January 1982 (age 44)
- Place of birth: Rome, Italy
- Height: 1.85 m (6 ft 1 in)
- Position: Forward

Team information
- Current team: ASD Play Eur
- Number: 10

Senior career*
Years	Team	Apps	(Gls)
1999–2000	Roma	0	(0)
2000–2002	Bolton	2	(0)
2002–2003	Panachaiki	25	(4)
2003–2004	Vicenza	10	(1)
2005–2007	Lumezzane	55	(9)
2007–2009	Sambenedettese	56	(10)
2009	Botev Plovdiv	10	(6)
2010	Foggia	10	(0)
2010–2011	Cynthia 1920	25	(7)
2011–2012	Viterbese	33	(11)
2012–2013	Shumen 2010	12	(3)
2013–2014	Lupa Roma	23	(15)
2014–2015	Viterbese	30	(12)
2015	Partizani Tirana	3	(1)
2016–2017	SFF Atletico	?	(9)
2017–	ASD Play Eur	?	(?)
- * Club domestic league appearances and goals as of 14 September 2015

Emanuele Morini (born 31 January 1982, in Rome) is an Italian football player who plays as a forward for ASD Play Eur.

== Career ==
Morini was educated in Roma's youth academy, but not played games for the club before moving to English side Bolton Wanderers in September 2000. After only three games for Bolton between 2000 and 2002, he signed with Greek Panachaiki, where he appeared in 25 Alpha Ethniki matches. In 2004, Morini returned to Italy and in the next five seasons played for Vicenza, Lumezzane and Sambenedettese.

On 5 September 2009, Morini relocated to Bulgaria and signed a contract with Botev Plovdiv. A few days later, Morini scored his first goal for the club in a match against Litex Lovech. On 30 October 2009, Morini scored the crucial winning goal against the city rivals Lokomotiv Plovdiv, and helped his team to win the derby with 1–0. He returned to Italy, following Botev Plovdiv's administrative relegation from the first division.

In January 2010, Morini returned to Italy playing with Foggia. In 2011, Morini moved to Cynthia 1920, where he scored seven goals. In 2012, Morini moved to Viterbese where he scored eleven goals in 33 matches.

In September 2012, Morini relocated again to Bulgaria and signed a contract with Shumen 2010.

In January 2012, Morini requested to terminate the contract with Shumen 2010.

In 2013–14, he played with Lupa Roma. He was the top-goalscorer of the team as they were promoted to Lega Pro. He had a fine form with Viterbese, having scored eight goals in 15 matches.

In August 2015, he went to Albania and signed a one-year contract with Albanian Superliga side Partizani Tirana, taking the vacant number 34 for the 2015–16 season.
