= Chudomir Grigorov =

Bulgarian footballer

Personal information
- Date of birth: 18 March 1989 (age 37)
- Place of birth: Plovdiv, Bulgaria
- Height: 1.86 m (6 ft 1 in)
- Position: Centre-back

Youth career
- Botev Plovdiv

Senior career*
| Years | Team | Apps | (Gls) |
| 2008–2010 | Botev Plovdiv | 12 | (0) |
| 2010–2011 | Spartak Plovdiv | 19 | (0) |
| 2012–2013 | Chavdar Etropole | 29 | (0) |
- * Club domestic league appearances and goals as of 1 June 2013

Chudomir Grigorov (Bulgarian: Чудомир Григоров; born 18 March 1989) is a Bulgarian former professional footballer who played as a defender for Botev Plovdiv, Spartak Plovdiv and Chavdar Etropole. He is now a personal fitness trainer.

== Football career ==
Born in Plovdiv, Grigorov was educated to football in Botev's youth academies. He made his debut for the first team on June 15, 2009, in the 0–3 loss against Lokomotiv Plovdiv in the Eternal derby of Plovdiv.

== Trivia ==
- Chudomir Grigorov's nickname is "The Wonder" (Bulgarian: Чудото), which comes from his first name.
