= Luca Brignoli =

Italian football player

Personal information
- Date of birth: January 12, 1983 (age 43)
- Place of birth: Bergamo, Italy
- Height: 1.86 m (6 ft 1 in)
- Position: Goalkeeper

Team information
- Current team: Albate

Senior career*
Years	Team	Apps	(Gls)
2001–2002	Atalanta	0	(0)
2002–2007	Lumezzane	83	(0)
2008	Ancona	1	(0)
2008–2009	Ravenna	16	(0)
2009–2010	Botev Plovdiv	2	(0)
2010–	Albate Calcio	0	(0)
- * Club domestic league appearances and goals as of June 22, 2009

Luca Brignoli (born 12 January 1983 in Bergamo) is an Italian football player, who currently plays for Albate Calcio at Seconda Categoria (9th level).

== Career ==
In January 2008, he swapped club with Davide Zomer.

He has played for Bulgarian side Botev Plovdiv since mid-2009, leaving the team after it was administratively relegated in 2010.
