= Anton Vergilov =

Bulgarian footballer

Personal information
- Full name: Anton Todorov Vergilov
- Date of birth: 31 January 1985 (age 41)
- Place of birth: Sofia, Bulgaria
- Height: 1.85 m (6 ft 1 in)
- Position: Centre-back

Senior career*
Years	Team	Apps	(Gls)
2002–2007	Levski Sofia	3	(0)
2003–2007	→ Rodopa Smolyan (loan)	62	(0)
2007–2008	Beroe	7	(0)
2008–2009	Marek Dupnitsa	6	(0)
2009	Botev Plovdiv	3	(0)
2010	Kom-Minyor	11	(0)
2010–2011	Chavdar Byala Slatina	11	(0)
2011–2012	Calisia Kalisz	21	(0)
2012	Hamrun Spartans	12	(0)
2013	Oborishte	11	(0)
2013	Neftochimic 1986	1	(0)
2014	Oborishte	13	(0)
2014–2015	Minyor Pernik		
- * Club domestic league appearances and goals

Anton Vergilov (Bulgarian: Антон Вергилов; born 31 January 1985) is a Bulgarian former professional footballer who played as a centre-back.

== Career ==
Born in Sofia, Anton Vergilov was educated in football in Levski's youth academies. In 2002, the 17-year-old Vergilov signed his first professional contract with the club from the Suhata Reka neighborhood. However, due to the great amount of competition in the defensive roles, he was loaned for four years to Rodopa Smolyan. With the team from Smolyan, Vergilov achieved 62 appearances in the top divisions of Bulgarian football and his good displays as a defender were used again in the following years, while playing for Beroe Stara Zagora and Marek Dupnitsa.

In 2009, Vergilov signed a 2+1 years contract with Botev Plovdiv but left when the club went bankrupt in early 2010.

Anton was known for being very religious. His love for Jesus came from his grandmother who seemed to incorporate him into everything she did. By the time Anton's football career had begun, he had started to do the same.
