= Alberto Rebecca =

Italian footballer (born 1985)

Personal information
- Date of birth: May 30, 1985 (age 41)
- Place of birth: Montebelluna, Italy
- Height: 1.80 m (5 ft 11 in)
- Position: Winger

Team information
- Current team: GSD Ambrosiana

Senior career*
Years	Team	Apps	(Gls)
2004–2006	Cuoiovaldarno	52	(4)
2006–2009	Venezia	38	(2)
2007–2008	→ Sangiovannese (loan)	8	(2)
2009–2010	Botev Plovdiv	10	(1)
2010	Carpenedolo	8	(0)
2010–2011	Virtusvecomp Verona	25	(7)
2011	Sacilese	9	(1)
2011–2012	Tamai	18	(4)
2012–2013	Ars et Labor Grottaglie	22	(4)
2013–2014	Pianese	6	(0)
2014–2015	Vigontina San Paolo	21	(7)
2015–2016	ASD Mestrina	?	(?)
2016–2017	SCD Ligorna 1922	28	(5)
2017–	GSD Ambrosiana	9	(1)
- * Club domestic league appearances and goals as of 18 December 2017

Alberto Rebecca (born 30 May 1985) is an Italian football player who plays for GSD Ambrosiana.
