= Gilberto Zanoletti =

Italian footballer

Personal information
- Date of birth: 2 January 1980 (age 46)
- Place of birth: Brescia, Italy
- Height: 1.65 m (5 ft 5 in)
- Position: Midfielder

Youth career
- Lumezzane

Senior career*
| Years | Team | Apps | (Gls) |
| 1999–2004 | Lumezzane | 88 | (7) |
| 1999–2000 | → Rodengo Saiano (loan) | 33 | (4) |
| 2004–2005 | Vicenza | 18 | (2) |
| 2005 | Verona | 0 | (0) |
| 2006 | Lumezzane | 17 | (0) |
| 2007 | Cremonese | 18 | (3) |
| 2008 | Sangiovannese | 12 | (0) |
| 2008–2009 | Pizzighettone | 18 | (1) |
| 2009 | Botev Plovdiv | 9 | (0) |
| 2010 | Verolese | 2 | (1) |
| 2011 | Torres | 9 | (2) |
| 2011–2012 | Rudianese | 17 | (1) |
| 2012 | Itala San Marco | 16 | (2) |
| 2012–2013 | Travagliato | 16 | (0) |
| 2013 | Vasto Marina | 5 | (0) |
| 2014 | Tortoli Calcio | 14 | (2) |
| 2014–2015 | Royale Fiore | 13 | (2) |
| 2015 | A.C. Rezzato | 8 | (1) |

Managerial career
- 2018–2021: Feralpisalò (youth)
- * Club domestic league appearances and goals

Gilberto Zanoletti (born 2 January 1980) is an Italian football coach and a former midfielder.

== Biography ==
Zanoletti started his career at Lombard club Lumezzane. In January 2004 he left for Serie B club Vicenza in co-ownership deal for €300,000. In June 2005 Lumezzane's half was sold to Vicenza outright for free and Vicenza swap the half with Verona for Marco Mancinelli. Half of the registration of the players were both tagged for €475,000. Zanoletti wore no.88 shirt in pre-season. On 31 August he returned to Vicenza in 2-year contract for free and Verona also bought half of Julien Rantier's contract for €270,000 as well as the return of Mancinelli also for free. The direct swaps made both clubs had a financial benefits but not in the field (Note: The deals made both club had a player selling revenue of €950,000 (documented in 2005–06 financial year on Vicenza side), an write-down of €475,000 due to buy back (new price €0 + €475,000 minus €950,000 accounting value), a new acquire cost of €475,000 (€0 + price of retained half) to be amortize in future seasons (2 years for Zanoletti) and lastly VAT, but overall still a "profit" when the transfer is effective (€950,000) and an overall loss (€950,000 minus €950,000 minus VAT, occur in 2005–06 and 2006–07 accounts if the player did not release early in Vicenza side). However Vicenza later chose to release Zanoletti for free and write-down a further €475,000, to make the loss come early and gave up the remaining contractual value, in order to make the overall loss only occur in 2005–06 accounts, despite his true market value as a Serie C1 player was negligible in consideration.). Zanoletti returned to Lumezzane in January 2006 as free agent but in January of next year he left for Cremonese. In January 2008 he left for Sangiovannese. In November 2008 he joined Pizzighettone. In 2009–10 season he spent half-season in Bulgarian A PFG club Botev Plovdiv and another half for Verolese of Serie D. In February 2011 he joined Torres of Eccellenza Sardinia. In 2011–12 Serie D he played for Rudianese and Itala San Marco Gradisca. In December 2012 he joined Aurora Travagliato of Eccellenza Lombardy. In November 2013 he played for Vasto Marina of Eccellenza Abruzzo while in December 2013 he moved to Sardinia to the team of Tortolì. In September 2014 he signed for Royale Fiore Piacenza while in January 2015 he joined A.C. Rezzato of Eccellenza Lombardy.
