= ASD Sporting Terni =

Italian football club

Sporting Terni
- Full name: Associazione Sportiva Dilettantistica Sporting Terni
- Founded: 2009
- Dissolved: NO
- Ground: Stadio Mirko Fabrizi, Terni, Italy
- Capacity: 1,070
- 2012–13: Serie D, 10th
Home colours	Away colours

Associazione Sportiva Dilettantistica Sporting Terni was an Italian association football club, based in Terni, Umbria.

== History ==
The club was founded in 2009 after the merging of G.S. Arrone (that played Serie D in the 2008–09 season), Gabelletta and Nuova Virgilio Maroso. Arrone, Gabelletta and Virgilio Maroso were all refounded in the lower leagues.

It was relegated to Eccellenza at the end of the 2009–10 season and it has been called back to Serie D due to a large number of exclusions.

In summer 2013 the club wasn't able to enter 2013–14 Serie D and was so subsequently liquidated.

== Colors and badge ==
The team's colors were white, green and dark red.

== Stadium ==
It played its home matches at the Stadio Mirko Fabrizi.
