= FC Svilengrad =

Bulgarian football club

Svilengrad 1921
- Full name: Football Club Svilengrad 1921
- Founded: August 1, 1921; 104 years ago
- Ground: Kolodruma Stadium, Svilengrad
- Capacity: 1,750
- 2022–23: A RFG Haskovo, 7th
Home colours	Away colours

FC Svilengrad 1921 (ФК Свиленград 1921) is a Bulgarian football club from the town of Svilengrad, currently running only youth academy.

== History ==
It was founded on August 1, 1921 and was formerly known as Botev Sport Club.

Svilengrad plays its home matches in the Kolodruma Stadium, has a capacity of 1,750 spectators. The record attendance is 2,500 for the game of Bulgarian Cup against CSKA Sofia on 25 November 2009.
