= PFC Brestnik 1948 =

Bulgarian football club

Brestnik 1948
- Full name: Професионален футболен клуб Брестник 1948 (Professional football club Brestnik 1948)
- Founded: 1948; 77 years ago
- Ground: Berkut Stadium, Brestnik
- Capacity: 3,000
- Chairman: Vladimir Marinov
- Manager: Ivan Marinov
- League: Regional Amateur Football League
- 2013-14: Southeast V AFG, 18th, relegated
Home colours	Away colours

PFC Brestnik 1948 (Брестник 1948) is a Bulgarian football club from the small neighborhood of Brestnik, located in the Greater Plovdiv area. The club will play its home matches at the Berkut Stadium, which is undergoing construction. The team currently plays in the B PFG - the second division of Bulgarian football. Brestnik's best season in the second division was in the 2009/2010 season - sixth place.

== Honours ==
- South-East V AFG
  - Champions: 2008–09
  - Sixth place in the East "B" group: 2009/10
  - 1/16 finalist for the National Cup tournament: this time its official name is the Cup of Bulgaria - 2009 / '10

== History ==
Brestnik 1948 was founded in 1948. During the whole history the team was competing in the amateur football and was a stepping-stone for the young football players that have left the schools of professional clubs in Plovdiv. At different periods of time, the team outfit was put on by Ayan Sadakov, Georgi Ivanov-Gonzo, Dimitar Telkiyski, Veselin Tosev and others. During season 2002–2003, the team won 1st place in „А” regional group - Plovdiv (the fourth division of Bulgarian football) and for the first time in its history entered in the third division. During the 2008–2009 season, the team took first place in the third division and qualified for the B PFG for the upcoming season.

== Current squad ==
As of August 25, 2011 Note: Flags indicate national team as defined under FIFA eligibility rules; some limited exceptions apply. Players may hold more than one non-FIFA nationality.

No.	Pos.	Nation	Player
1	GK	BUL	Georgi Kirov
2	DF	BUL	Dimitar Dumchev
3	MF	BUL	Kostadin Tasarov
6	MF	BUL	Yordan Etov
7	MF	BUL	Kamen Krozdanov
8	MF	BUL	Mario Georgiev
9	FW	BUL	Aleksandar Stoychev
10	MF	BUL	Panayot Hristov
11	MF	BUL	Nikola Denev

No.	Pos.	Nation	Player
12	GK	BUL	Martin Kostadinov
14	DF	BUL	Georgi Bachvarov
17	MF	BUL	Plamen Kolarov
18	GK	BUL	Georgi Argilashki
19	FW	BUL	Borislav Nikiforov
33	GK	SCO	Andro Mathewson (Youth)
20	FW	BUL	Stanimir Kovachev
21	DF	BUL	Bozhidar Iliev
22	DF	BUL	Svetoslav Georgiev
23	MF	BUL	Petyo Dimitrov
