= 2009–10 PFC CSKA Sofia season =

CSKA Sofia
2009–10 season
- Chairman: Dimitar Borisov
- Manager: Manager; Adalbert Zafirov; Head Coach; Dimitar Penev
- A Group: Second place
- Bulgarian Cup: Quarterfinals
- UEFA Europa League: Group Stage
- Top goalscorer: League: Ivan Stoyanov – 8 All: Ivan Stoyanov – 9
- Highest home attendance: 38,000 vs Fulham (17 September 2009)
- Lowest home attendance: 360 vs Montana (4 April 2010)
Home colours	Away colours

The 2009–10 season was PFC CSKA Sofia's 62nd consecutive season in A Group. This article shows player statistics and all matches (official and friendly) that the club have and will play during the 2009–10 season.

== Team Kit ==
The team kit for the 2009–10 season is produced by Uhlsport and sponsored by Globul since 7 September 2009. The club introduced a new third kit at the game against Derry City

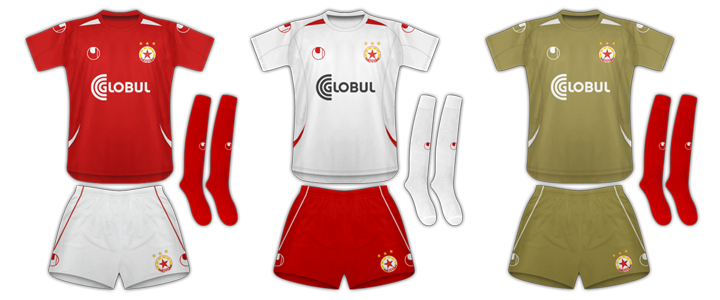

== Players ==
=== Squad information ===
Appearances for competitive matches only

No.	Pos	Nat	Player	Total		A Group		Bulgarian Cup		Europa League	
No.	Pos	Nat	Player	Apps	Goals	Apps	Goals	Apps	Goals	Apps	Goals
1	GK	(Bulgaria) BUL	Zdravko Chavdarov	17	0	10	0	2	0	5	0
2	DF	(Bulgaria) BUL	Pavel Vidanov	30	0	20	0	2	0	8	0
4	DF	(Bulgaria) BUL	Kostadin Stoyanov	32	1	24	1	3	0	5	0
5	MF	(Bulgaria) BUL	Todor Yanchev	35	6	25	5	2	0	8	1
6	MF	(Bulgaria) BUL	Georgi Amzin	1	0	1	0	0	0	0	0
7	FW	(Bulgaria) BUL	Vladimir Manchev	9	1	5	1	0	0	4	0
8	DF	(Bulgaria) BUL	Rumen Trifonov	13	1	12	1	1	0	0	0
10	FW	(Portugal) POR	Rui Miguel	25	4	18	4	1	0	6	0
12	GK	(Bulgaria) BUL	Ivan Karadzhov	24	0	18	0	0	0	6	0
13	DF	(Bulgaria) BUL	Aleksandar Branekov	10	1	7	1	1	0	2	0
14	MF	(Bulgaria) BUL	Svetoslav Petrov	18	0	12	0	3	0	3	0
17	MF	(Romania) ROU	Florentin Petre	8	1	8	1	0	0	0	0
18	MF	(Bulgaria) BUL	Boris Galchev	10	0	9	0	1	0	0	0
19	DF	(Bulgaria) BUL	Apostol Popov	17	1	13	1	2	0	2	0
20	MF	(Bulgaria) BUL	Nikolay Manchev	14	0	10	0	2	0	2	0
21	MF	(Bulgaria) BUL	Kosta Yanev	26	1	15	1	2	0	9	0
22	FW	(Brazil) BRA	Michel Platini	25	4	17	2	2	1	6	1
28	MF	(Brazil) BRA	Marquinhos	20	5	13	4	0	0	7	1
29	FW	(Bulgaria) BUL	Ivaylo Zafirov	1	0	1	0	0	0	0	0
30	MF	(Bulgaria) BUL	Borislav Nikolov	1	0	1	0	0	0	0	0
32	MF	(Latvia) LAT	Viktors Morozs	17	0	11	0	0	0	6	0
33	DF	(Bulgaria) BUL	Kristiyan Velinov	1	0	1	0	0	0	0	0
52	DF	(Bulgaria) BUL	Yordan Minev	36	1	25	1	2	0	9	0
73	MF	(Bulgaria) BUL	Vladimir Baharov	1	0	1	0	0	0	0	0
77	MF	(Bulgaria) BUL	Spas Delev	36	4	26	2	3	1	7	1
88	MF	(France) FRA	Elliot Grandin	11	3	10	3	1	0	0	0
99	FW	(Bulgaria) BUL	Dormushali Saidhodzha	11	1	9	1	1	0	1	0
Players sold or loaned out after the start of the season:
3	MF	(Portugal) POR	David Silva	2	0	2	0	0	0	0	0
6	DF	(Bulgaria) BUL	Kiril Kotev	16	1	9	1	1	0	6	0
8	MF	(Bulgaria) BUL	Todor Timonov	18	2	10	2	2	0	6	0
11	MF	(Bulgaria) BUL	Orlin Orlinov	6	0	3	0	0	0	3	0
15	DF	(Bulgaria) BUL	Ivan Ivanov	20	2	11	1	1	0	8	1
18	MF	(Bulgaria) BUL	Atanas Zehirov	2	0	1	0	0	0	1	0
23	FW	(Romania) ROU	Daniel Pancu	8	2	7	2	1	0	0	0
24	DF	(Paraguay) PAR	Hugo Báez	4	0	2	0	1	0	1	0
27	GK	(Bulgaria) BUL	Ivaylo Petrov	3	0	2	0	1	0	0	0
29	FW	(Bulgaria) BUL	Blagoy Paskov	5	0	3	0	0	0	2	0
29	DF	(North Macedonia) MKD	Igor Mitreski	4	0	4	0	0	0	0	0
30	MF	(Bulgaria) BUL	Yordan Todorov	23	3	12	3	2	0	9	0
36	MF	(Bulgaria) BUL	Yanko Sandanski	2	0	2	0	0	0	0	0
73	FW	(Bulgaria) BUL	Ivan Stoyanov	21	9	13	8	1	0	7	1

As of game played start of season

== Players in/out ==
=== Summer transfers ===
In: Note: Flags indicate national team as defined under FIFA eligibility rules; some limited exceptions apply. Players may hold more than one non-FIFA nationality.

No.	Pos.	Nation	Player
1	GK	BUL	Zdravko Chavdarov (from Sliven)
4	DF	BUL	Kostadin Stoyanov (from Sliven)
8	MF	BUL	Todor Timonov (from Botev Plovdiv)
11	FW	BUL	Orlin Orlinov (from Slavia, previously on loan at Spartak Varna)
14	MF	BUL	Svetoslav Petrov (from Neftchi Baku)
19	DF	BUL	Apostol Popov (from Botev Plovdiv)
20	MF	BUL	Nikolay Manchev (from Botev Plovdiv)
21	MF	BUL	Kosta Yanev (from Sliven)
22	FW	BRA	Michel Platini (from Chernomorets Burgas)
24	DF	PAR	Hugo Báez (free agent)
26	MF	PAR	Jonathan Gómez (free agent)
73	FW	BUL	Ivan Stoyanov (from Sliven)
77	FW	BUL	Spas Delev (on loan from Pirin Blagoevgrad)
—	MF	BUL	Georgi Iliev (from Litex Lovech)

Out: Note: Flags indicate national team as defined under FIFA eligibility rules; some limited exceptions apply. Players may hold more than one non-FIFA nationality.

No.	Pos.	Nation	Player
1	GK	BUL	Ventsislav Velinov (to Botev Plovdiv)
2	DF	BUL	Pavel Kovachev (to Beroe)
4	DF	BUL	Kristian Uzunov (to Anagennisi Dherynia)
8	FW	BUL	Martin Toshev (to Chernomorets Burgas)
9	FW	BUL	Vladislav Zlatinov (to Bansko)
10	MF	BUL	Nikolay Chipev (on loan to Sportist)
11	FW	BUL	Zdravko Lazarov (to Cherno more)
17	MF	POR	Ze Rui (released)
19	FW	BUL	Evgeni Yordanov (released)
21	MF	NGR	Shikoze Udoji (to Asteras Tripolis)
22	DF	BRA	Eli Marques (to Cherno More)
23	DF	BUL	Aleksandar Sabev (on loan to Sportist)
24	MF	BUL	Aleksandar Tonev (on loan to Sliven)
25	GK	CMR	Daniel Bekono (released)
29	DF	BUL	Dimitar Petkov (on loan to Lokomotiv Mezdra)
34	FW	ISL	Garðar Gunnlaugsson (released)
84	DF	BRA	Filipe Machado (to Salernitana Calcio)
99	FW	BUL	Dormushali Saidhodzha (on loan to Litex Lovech)
—	MF	BUL	Georg Iliev (to CSKA Sofia II)
—	FW	ARG	German Pietrobon (to Sportist)
—	DF	BUL	Boyan Gaytanov (on loan to Lokomotiv Mezdra)
—	MF	BUL	Martin Dechev (on loan to Lokomotiv Mezdra)
—	MF	BUL	Dzihat Kyamil (on loan to Lokomotiv Mezdra)

=== Winter transfers ===
In: Note: Flags indicate national team as defined under FIFA eligibility rules; some limited exceptions apply. Players may hold more than one non-FIFA nationality.

No.	Pos.	Nation	Player
8	DF	BUL	Rumen Trifonov (from Minyor Pernik)
9	FW	BUL	Dimitar Iliev (from Lokomotiv Plovdiv)
17	MF	ROU	Florentin Petre (from Terek Grozny)
18	MF	BUL	Boris Galchev (from Pirin Blagoevgrad)
23	FW	ROU	Daniel Pancu (from Terek Grozny)
29	DF	MKD	Igor Mitreski (from Energie Cottbus)
88	MF	FRA	Elliot Grandin (free agent)
99	FW	BUL	Dormushali Saidhodzha (loan return from Litex Lovech)

Out: Note: Flags indicate national team as defined under FIFA eligibility rules; some limited exceptions apply. Players may hold more than one non-FIFA nationality.

No.	Pos.	Nation	Player
3	MF	POR	David Silva (on loan to CD Castellón)
6	DF	BUL	Kiril Kotev (to Lokomotiv Plovdiv)
7	FW	BUL	Vladimir Manchev (released)
8	MF	BUL	Todor Timonov (to FC Anzhi Makhachkala)
9	FW	BUL	Dimitar Iliev (on loan to Minyor Pernik)
11	FW	BUL	Orlin Orlinov (released)
15	DF	BUL	Ivan Ivanov (to FC Alania Vladikavkaz)
16	MF	BUL	Dimitar Kolarov (on loan to Bdin Vidin)
18	MF	BUL	Atanas Zehirov (on loan to Sliven)
23	MF	BUL	Tomislav Kostadinov (on loan to Bdin Vidin)
23	FW	ROU	Daniel Pancu (to FC Vaslui)
24	DF	PAR	Hugo Báez (released)
26	MF	PAR	Jonathan Gómez (released)
27	GK	BUL	Ivaylo Petrov (released)
29	FW	BUL	Blagoy Paskov (on loan to Bdin Vidin)
29	DF	MKD	Igor Mitreski (released)
30	MF	BUL	Yordan Todorov (to Lokomotiv Plovdiv)
36	MF	BUL	Yanko Sandanski (to Pirin Blagoevgrad)
37	DF	BUL	Rosen Kolev (on loan to Bdin Vidin)
73	FW	BUL	Ivan Stoyanov (to Alania Vladikavkaz)
—	DF	BUL	Aleksandar Sabev (to Kaliakra Kavarna, previously on loan to Sportist)
—	MF	BUL	Nikolay Chipev (to Lokomotiv Plovdiv, previously on loan to Sportist)
—	MF	BUL	Samir Ayass (on loan to Akademik Sofia)
—	MF	BUL	Marian Stanchev (on loan to Bdin Vidin)
—	GK	BUL	Dimitar Nachev (on loan to Bdin Vidin)
—	MF	BUL	Kiril Brestovichki (on loan to Bdin Vidin)
—	DF	BUL	Daniel Valeriev (on loan to Bdin Vidin)
—	FW	BUL	Dimitar Dimitrov (on loan to Bdin Vidin)

== Player seasonal records ==
Competitive matches only. Updated to games played 31 May 2010.

Key

Player left the club in mid-season
Player joined the club in mid-season

=== Goalscorers ===
Rank	Name	League	Cup	Europe	Total
1	Ivan Stoyanov	8	0	1	9
2	Todor Yanchev	5	0	1	6
3	Marquinhos	4	0	1	5
4	Michel Platini	2	1	1	4
4	Spas Delev	2	1	1	4
4	Elliot Grandin	4	0	0	4
7	Rui Miguel	3	0	0	3
7	Yordan Todorov	3	0	0	3
9	Ivan Ivanov	1	0	1	2
9	Todor Timonov	2	0	0	2
9	Daniel Pancu	2	0	0	2
12	Kiril Kotev	1	0	0	1
12	Kosta Yanev	1	0	0	1
12	Vladimir Manchev	1	0	0	1
12	Kostadin Stoyanov	1	0	0	1
12	Florentin Petre	1	0	0	1
12	Dormushali Saidhodzha	1	0	0	1
12	Apostol Popov	1	0	0	1
12	Rumen Trifonov	1	0	0	1
12	Yordan Minev	1	0	0	1
12	Aleksandar Branekov	1	0	0	1

== Pre-season and friendlies ==
Win Draw Loss Fixtures

=== Pre-season ===
29 June 2009 Friendly	CSKA (Bulgaria)	1–3	(Slovakia) Žilina	Sankt Veit, Austria
19:00 EET	Saidhodzha 84'; Martin Camano (yellow card) 44'	(Report)	Adauto 7'; Jež 45'; Gadar 88' (pen.); Lietava (yellow card) 38'	Attendance: 50

1 July 2009 Friendly	CSKA (Bulgaria)	0–1	Austria Kärnten	Feffernitz, Austria
19:30 EET	Morozs (yellow card) 49'	(Report)	Pink 3'	Attendance: 300

4 July 2009 Friendly	CSKA (Bulgaria)	0–2	(Czech Republic) Sparta Prague	Sankt Veit, Austria
19:30 EET	Minev (yellow card) 56'	(Report)	Wilfried 23'; Berger 35'	Attendance: 300

5 July 2009 Friendly	CSKA (Bulgaria)	0–2	(Hungary) Videoton	Gmünd, Austria
19:00 EET		(Report)	Alves 16'; Vujović 28'

7 July 2009 Friendly	CSKA (Bulgaria)	2–1	(Romania) Steaua București	Sankt Veit, Austria
19:30 EET	Rui Miguel 12'; Kotev 58'	(Report)	Surdu 88'; Ochiroşii (yellow card) 63'; Bicfalvi (yellow card) 68'; Stancu (yellow card) 80'	Attendance: 250

9 July 2009 Friendly	CSKA (Bulgaria)	3–3	(Germany) Duisburg	Velden, Austria
19:30 EET	Marquinhos 3'; Kotev 16'; I.Stoyanov 21'; Petrov (yellow card) 70'; Zehirov (yellow card) 88'	(Report)	N'Daye 38'; Diabang 44'; Tiffert 71'

18 July 2009 Friendly	CSKA (Bulgaria)	5–0	(North Macedonia) Renova	Sofia
20:00 EET	I.Stoyanov 24'; Rui Miguel 31' (pen.); Delev 32'; Vidanov 59'; Saidhodzha 71'	(Report)		Stadium: Balgarska Armiya; Attendance: 1 500; Referee: Angel Angelov

23 July 2009 Friendly	CSKA (Bulgaria)	1–1	(Azerbaijan) Inter Baku	Sofia
20:00 EET	Rui Miguel 38'	(Report)	Mammadov 90+3'	Stadium: Vasil Levski; Attendance: 6 000; Referee: Anton Genov

=== On-season (autumn) ===
5 September 2009 Friendly	Sportist Svoge	1–0	CSKA	Svoge
12:00 EET	Vasilev 90'; Chakarov (yellow card) 12'; Dimov (yellow card) 76' (yellow-red card) 77'	(Report)	Gómez (yellow card) 45'; Morozs (yellow card) 64'; Orlinov (yellow card) 90'	Stadium: Chavdar Tsvetkov; Attendance: 600; Referee: Kalin Lyudmilov

10 October 2009 Friendly	Bansko	0–1	CSKA	Bansko
11:00 EET	Zlatinov (red card) 43'	(Report)	Rui Miguel 86'	Stadium: Sveti Petar; Attendance: 1 000

14 November 2009 Friendly	CSKA "White"	2–2 (8–5 p)	CSKA "Red"	Sofia
11:00 EET	Todorov 12', 22'	(Report)	Timonov 42'; David Silva 52'	Stadium: Balgarska Armiya; Attendance: 300
	Penalties
	Yanchev (penalty missed); Sandanski (penalty scored); Todorov (penalty scored); Rui Miguel (penalty scored); Hugo Báez (penalty scored); I. Ivanov (penalty scored); Aess (penalty scored); Kolev (penalty missed); Zehirov (penalty scored); Zdravkov (penalty scored)		(penalty scored) Timonov; (penalty missed) S. Petrov; (penalty scored) Kotev; (penalty scored) D. Dimitrov; (penalty scored) Popov; (penalty missed) T. Kostadinov; (penalty missed) Yankov; (penalty missed) David Silva; (penalty scored) Penev

=== Mid-season ===
22 January 2010 Friendly	CSKA	6–0	Slivnishki Geroy	Tsarsko selo
11:00 EET	Pancu 27', 87'; Timonov 59'; Branekov 63'; Petre 75'; D. Iliev 81'	(Report)		Stadium: Tsarsko Selo Stadium; Referee: Bogomil Marinov

22 January 2010 Friendly	CSKA	9–0	Minyor Bobov Dol	Tsarsko selo
15:00 EET	Todorov 39'; Delev 45', 55'; Morozs 57', 60'; Minev 63'; Noble 75', 78'; Rui Miguel 77'	(Report)		Stadium: Tsarsko Selo Stadium; Referee: Bogomil Marinov

24 January 2010 Friendly	CSKA	7–2	Akademik Sofia	Tsarsko selo
11:00 EET	Petre 1', 59'; D.Iliev 17'; Mitreski 56' (pen.); Morozs 62'; Saidhodzha 85'; Grandin 90'	(Report)	Vasilev 22'; Bozhov 34'	Stadium: Tsarsko Selo Stadium; Attendance: 300; Referee: Georgi Dimitrov

24 January 2010 Friendly	CSKA	4–0	Rilski Sportist Samokov	Tsarsko selo
15:00 EET	Rui Miguel 53'; Timonov 69'; Orlinov 85'; K.Stoyanov 90'; Popov (yellow card) 59'	(Report)	Mamadu (yellow card) 19'	Stadium: Tsarsko Selo Stadium; Referee: Georgi Dimitrov

30 January 2010 Friendly	CSKA (Bulgaria)	3–0	(Romania) Politehnica Iaşi	Belek, Turkey
15:00 EET	Michel Platini 48'; Pancu 53'; Rui Miguel 67'	(Report)		Stadium: Mardan Sport Stadium; Attendance: 30

2 February 2010 Friendly	CSKA (Bulgaria)	0–1	(Russia) Volga Nizhny Novgorod	Belek, Turkey
17:30 EET		(Report)	Vinogradov 73'	Stadium: Cornelia Complex Stadium

4 February 2010 Friendly	CSKA (Bulgaria)	1–0	Austria Kärnten	Belek, Turkey
17:30 EET	Pancu 72'; Mitreski (yellow card) 52'	(Report)	Riedl (yellow card) 44'	Stadium: Cornelia Complex Stadium; Attendance: 30

6 February 2010 Friendly	CSKA (Bulgaria)	0–0	(Russia) Spartak Moscow	Belek, Turkey
17:00 EET		(Report)	Suchý (yellow card) 50'	Stadium: Cornelia Complex Stadium; Attendance: 50; Referee: Robert Moisey (Slovakia)

9 February 2010 Friendly	CSKA (Bulgaria)	1–0	(Russia) Tom Tomsk	Belek, Turkey
17:30 EET	Rui Miguel 59'; Vidanov (yellow card) 70'	(Report)	Zobnin (yellow card) 73'	Stadium: Cornelia Complex Stadium

12 February 2010 Friendly	CSKA (Bulgaria)	3–0	(Slovakia) Slovan	Belek, Turkey
15:00 EET	I. Ivanov 10'; Rui Miguel 58'; Putnocký 62' (o.g.); Rui Miguel (yellow card) 43'; Saidhodzha (yellow card) 70'; S. Petrov (yellow card) 90'	(Report)	Dosoudil (yellow card) 36'	Stadium: Cornelia Complex Stadium

19 February 2010 Friendly	Svilengrad	0–1	CSKA	Svilengrad
15:00 EET	I. Yanchev (yellow card) 66'	(Report)	Saidhodzha 67'; Michel Platini (yellow card) 57'	Stadium: Kolodruma; Attendance: 1,600; Referee: Georgi Kabakov

== Competitions ==
=== A Group ===
==== Table ====
Pos	Team	Pld	W	D	L	GF	GA	GD	Pts	Qualification or relegation
1	Litex Lovech (C)	30	22	4	4	59	17	+42	70	Qualification for Champions League second qualifying round
2	CSKA Sofia	30	16	10	4	51	25	+26	58	Qualification for Europa League third qualifying round
3	Levski Sofia	30	17	6	7	57	26	+31	57	Qualification for Europa League second qualifying round
4	Lokomotiv Sofia	30	15	7	8	47	33	+14	52	
5	Chernomorets Burgas	30	15	6	9	44	29	+15	51	

Source: A PFG (in Bulgarian)
Rules for classification: 1st points; 2nd head-to-head points; 3rd head-to-head goal difference; 4th head-to-head goals scored; 5th head-to-head away goals scored; 6th goal difference; 7th goals scored
(C) Champions

==== Results summary ====
Overall								Home						Away					
Pld	W	D	L	GF	GA	GD	Pts	W	D	L	GF	GA	GD	W	D	L	GF	GA	GD
30	16	10	4	51	25	+26	58	10	4	1	32	11	+21	6	6	3	19	14	+5

Last updated: 16 May 2010.
Source: Soccerway

==== Results by round ====
Round	1	2	3	4	5	6	7	8	9	10	11	12	13	14	15	16	17	18	19	20	21	22	23	24	25	26	27	28	29	30
Ground	A	H	A	H	A	H	A	H	A	H	A	H	A	A	H	H	A	H	A	H	A	H	A	H	A	H	A	H	H	A
Result	W	W	W	W	D	W	W	W	W	L	L	W	D	D	D	W	D	W	L	D	D	D	W	W	D	W	W	W	D	L
Position	1	1	1	1	1	1	1	1	1	2	3	2	2	2	2	2	2	2	2	3	3	3	3	3	3	3	2	2	2	2

Source: CSKA Sofia league results
A = Away; H = Home; W = Win; D = Draw; L = Loss

==== Fixtures and results ====
9 August 2009 1	Lokomotiv Plovdiv	0–5	CSKA	Plovdiv
17:30 EET	Akalski (yellow card) 53'; Kyumurdzhiev (yellow card) 53'; Ton (yellow card) 62'	Report	Kotev 7'; I. Stoyanov 45', 54' (pen.); Rui Miguel 60'; Timonov 78'; Vidanov (yellow card) 42' (yellow-red card) 70'	Stadium: Lauta; Attendance: 1,860; Referee: Stanislav Todorov

16 August 2009 2	CSKA	3–0	Beroe	Sliven
18:30 EET	Yanev 18'; Todorov 64'; I. Ivanov 83'; Todorov (yellow card) 58'	Report	Genchev (yellow card) 58'; Atanasov (yellow card) 90'	Stadium: Hadzhi Dimitar; Attendance: 5,060; Referee: Ahmed Ahmed

23 August 2009 3	Sportist Svoge	0–2	CSKA	Sofia
16:45 EET	Cvetkov (yellow card) 26'; Harizanov (yellow card) 28'; Bachkov (yellow card) 28'; Dimov (yellow card) 90'	Report	Marquinhos 13'; Todorov 45'; Marquinhos (yellow card) 33'; S. Petrov (yellow card) 52'	Stadium: Ovcha Kupel; Attendance: 2,190; Referee: Stefan Spasov

30 August 2009 4	CSKA	4–0	Lokomotiv Mezdra	Sofia
16:45 EET	Todorov 17'; I. Stoyanov 26', 77' (pen.); V. Manchev 70'; Delev (yellow card) 38'	Report	Linkov (yellow card) 24'	Stadium: Balgarska Armiya; Attendance: 4,830; Referee: Stanislav Todorov

12 September 2009 5	Pirin	0–0	CSKA	Kyustendil
16:30 EET	Tsachev (yellow card) 45'; Peev (yellow card) 84'; Mitrevski (yellow card) 90'	Report	I. Stoyanov (yellow card) 61'; Timonov (yellow card) 85'	Stadium: Osogovo; Attendance: 2,770; Referee: Georgi Yordanov

20 September 2009 6	CSKA	2–0	Levski	Sofia
20:00 EET	I. Stoyanov 15'; K. Stoyanov 65'; Yanev (yellow card) 86'	Report	Benzoukane (yellow card) 25'; Petkov (yellow card) 46'; Yovov (yellow card) 86'; Simonović (yellow card) 90'	Stadium: Vasil Levski; Attendance: 16,790; Referee: Anton Genov

26 September 2009 7	Montana	1–2	CSKA	Montana
16:45 EET	Harlov 87'; V. Ivanov (yellow card) 45'; Harlov (yellow card) 86'	Report	Marquinhos 6'; Michel Platini 62'; I. Stoyanov (yellow card) 38'; Kotev (yellow card) 49'; I. Ivanov (yellow card) 88'; Morozs (yellow card) 89'	Stadium: Ogosta; Attendance: 4,500; Referee: Stefan Spasov

4 October 2009 8	CSKA	1–0	Sliven	Sofia
19:30 EET	Timonov 43'; I. Stoyanov (yellow card) 39'; S. Petrov (yellow card) 81'	Report	Velev (yellow card); Bakalov (yellow card) 78'	Stadium: Balgarska Armiya; Attendance: 1,200; Referee: Ahmed Ahmed

17 October 2009 9	Botev Plovdiv	0–1	CSKA	Plovdiv
16:00 EET	Tinazzi (yellow card) 38'; Brizzi (yellow card) 58'; Morini (yellow card) 79'	Report	I. Stoyanov 51'; I. Stoyanov (yellow card) 38'; Timonov (yellow card) 75'; Morozs (yellow card) 89'	Stadium: Hristo Botev; Attendance: 6,440; Referee: Stanislav Todorov

25 October 2009 10	CSKA	0–3	Minyor	Sofia
19:30 EET	Michel Platini (penalty missed); Minev (yellow card) 18'; Branekov (yellow card) 58'; I. Ivanov (yellow card) 63'; Marquinhos (yellow card) 82'	Report	Trifonov 15', 90+1'; Zlatkov 52'; Bozhikov (yellow card) 31'; Zlatkov (yellow card) 45'; Krumov (yellow card) 47'; Trifonov (yellow card) 57'; Nikolov (yellow card) 61'; Gospodinov (yellow card) 23' (yellow-red card) 70'	Stadium: Balgarska Armiya; Attendance: 850; Referee: Radan Miryanov

1 November 2009 11	Litex	2–0	CSKA	Lovech
16:00 EET	Niflore 10'; Yanev 72'; Barthe (yellow card) 52'	Report	Todorov (yellow card) 45'; S. Petrov (yellow card) 47'; K. Stoyanov (yellow card) 51'; Yanchev (yellow card) 83'	Stadium: Gradski; Attendance: 2,700; Referee: Stefan Spasov

8 November 2009 12	CSKA	2–0	Slavia	Sofia
19:30 EET	I. Stoyanov 26'; Delev 47'; Miguel (yellow card) 54'; Sandanski (yellow card) 69'; Minev (yellow card) 89'	Report	Du Bala (yellow card) 8'; Kolev (yellow card) 24'; B. Georgiev (yellow card) 27'	Stadium: Balgarska Armiya; Attendance: 900; Referee: Aleksandar Kostadinov

21 November 2009 13	Lokomotiv Sofia	2–2	CSKA	Sofia
14:30 EET	Kamburov 18' (pen.); Mitev 71'; Savić (yellow card) 12'; Markov (yellow card) 12'; Mitev (yellow card) 71' (yellow-red card) 82'	Report	I. Stoyanov 13' (pen.); Michel Platini 24'; Branekov (yellow card) 17'; Minev (yellow card) 68'; Sandanski (yellow card) 75'	Stadium: Lokomotiv; Attendance: 1,300; Referee: Stefan Spasov

28 November 2009 14	Cherno More	0–0	CSKA	Varna
14:30 EET	Aleksandrov (yellow card) 47'; Eli Marques (yellow card) 70'	Report	Michel Platini (yellow card) 63'; S. Petrov (yellow card) 88'	Stadium: Ticha; Attendance: 7,660; Referee: Ahmed Ahmed

6 December 2009 15	CSKA	0–0	Chernomorets	Sofia
19:30 EET		Report		Stadium: Balgarska Armiya; Attendance: 2,000; Referee: Anton Genov

27 February 2010 16	CSKA	3–2	Lokomotiv Plovdiv	Sofia
16:45 EET	Rui Miguel 15', 28'; Pancu 34'; Mitreski (yellow card) 36'; Petre (yellow card) 84'; Saidhodzha (yellow card) 87'	Report	Lazarov 37' (pen.), 54' (pen.); Dakson (yellow card) 23'; Kyumurdzhiev (yellow card) 30'; Todorov (yellow card) 34'; Bengelloun (yellow card) 41'; Dembélé (yellow card) 61'; Yoshev (yellow card) 74'; Chilikov (yellow card) 87'	Stadium: Balgarska Armiya; Attendance: 2,980; Referee: Stanislav Todorov

6 March 2010 17	Beroe	0–0	CSKA	Stara Zagora
15:00 EET	I. Ivanov (yellow card) 41' (yellow-red card) 49'; Kostadinov (yellow card) 74'	Report	K. Stoyanov (yellow card) 33'; Mitreski (yellow card) 45'	Stadium: Beroe; Attendance: 6,960; Referee: Anton Genov

13 March 2010 18	CSKA	4–1	Sportist Svoge	Sofia
19:00 EET	Grandin 25'; Yanchev 35'; Petre 41'; Pancu 83' (pen.); Pancu (yellow card) 32'; Michel Platini (yellow card) 34'; Minev (yellow card) 75'; Mitreski (yellow card) 90'	Report	M. Petrov 90' (pen.); M. Petrov (yellow card) 51'; L. Mladenov (yellow card) 74'; Dimov (yellow card) 83'	Stadium: Balgarska Armiya; Attendance: 910; Referee: Georgi Kabakov

21 March 2010 19	Lokomotiv Mezdra	4–0	CSKA	Mezdra
15:00 EET	Isa 61'; Koprivarov (yellow card) 58'	Report	Michel Platini (yellow card) 58'; Grandin (yellow card) 58'	Stadium: Lokomotiv; Attendance: 3,670; Referee: Ivaylo Stoyanov
Note: The match was suspended in 62nd minute at 1:0 due to a pitch invasion by the CSKA Sofia supporters.

24 March 2010 20	CSKA	1–1	Pirin	Kyustendil
14:00 EET	Saidhodzha 82'; Karadzhov (yellow card) 52'; Marquinhos (yellow card) 58'; Vidanov (yellow card) 70'	Report	Zlatkovski 50'; Kotsev (yellow card) 22'; Mihov (yellow card) 40'; Mladenov (yellow card) 73'	Stadium: Osogovo; Attendance: 920; Referee: Georgi Yordanov

27 March 2010 21	Levski	0–0	CSKA	Sofia
19:45 EET	Bardon (yellow card) 36'; Petráš (yellow card) 54'; Gadzhev (yellow card) 68'; Miliev (yellow card) 71'	Report	Pancu (yellow card) 39'; Yanev (yellow card) 48'	Stadium: Vasil Levski; Attendance: 12,710; Referee: Anton Genov

4 April 2010 22	CSKA	1–1	Montana	Svoge
16:45 EET	Marquinhos 47'; Trifonov (yellow card) 30'; Delev (yellow card) 58'	Report	Kondev 57'; V. Ivanov (yellow card) 63'; Iliev (yellow card) 86'; Todorov (yellow card) 90'	Stadium: Chavdar Tsvetkov; Attendance: 360; Referee: Radan Miryanov

10 April 2010 23	Sliven	2–4	CSKA	Sliven
15:00 EET	Mindev 13'; Kovachev 28'; Miranda (yellow card) 30'; I. Yanev (yellow card) 33'; Yamukov (yellow card) 44'; P. Stoyanov (yellow card) 64'; Kovachev (yellow card) 67'	Report	Yanchev 1'; Grandin 17'; Popov 26'; Trifonov 62'; Popov (yellow card) 34'; S. Petrov (yellow card) 66'; Marquinhos (yellow card) 83'; Michel Platini (yellow card) 88'	Stadium: Hadzhi Dimitar; Attendance: 1,770; Referee: Hristo Ristoskov

15 April 2010 24	CSKA	3–0 (w/o)	Botev Plovdiv	Sofia
19:30 EET				Stadium: Balgarska Armiya
Note: Match awarded due to excluding of Botev Plovdiv.

18 April 2010 25	Minyor	0–0	CSKA	Sofia
15:00 EET	Bozhikov (yellow card) 43'; Olegov (yellow card) 61'; Markov (yellow card) 83'	Report	Minev (yellow card) 26'; Marquinhos (yellow card) 33'; K. Stoyanov (yellow card) 40'	Stadium: Lokomotiv; Attendance: 1,300; Referee: Ahmed Ahmed

21 April 2010 26	CSKA	1–0	Litex	Sofia
19:30 EET	Yanchev 88'; K. Stoyanov (yellow card) 37'; Vidanov (yellow card) 40'; S. Petrov (yellow card) 60'; Yanchev (yellow card) 90'	Report	Bodurov (yellow card) 37'; Zanev (yellow card) 62'	Stadium: Balgarska Armiya; Attendance: 2,500; Referee: Stanislav Todorov

24 April 2010 27	Slavia	1–3	CSKA	Sofia
15:00 EET	Popara 68'; Tomash (yellow card) 24'; Reinette (yellow card) 28'; Popara (yellow card) 79'; Kolev (yellow card) 85'	Report	Grandin 25' (pen.); Delev 52'; Yanchev 63'; Delev (yellow card) 55'; Rui Miguel (yellow card) 57'; S. Petrov (yellow card) 69'	Stadium: Ovcha Kupel; Attendance: 1,420; Referee: Hristo Ristoskov

2 May 2010 28	CSKA	5–1	Lokomotiv Sofia	Sofia
18:00 EET	Marquinhos 33'; Minev 44'; Grandin 49'; Yanchev 72'; Branekov 85'; Minev (yellow card) 21'; Grandin (yellow card) 50'; Vidanov (yellow card) 77'	Report	Asamoah 17'; Dyakov (yellow card) 35'; Bandalovski (yellow card) 57'; Markov (yellow card) 87'	Stadium: Balgarska Armiya; Attendance: 2,500; Referee: Anton Genov

8 May 2010 29	CSKA	2–2	Cherno More	Sofia
18:00 EET	Grandin (penalty missed); Rui Miguel 60'; Aleksandrov 80' (o.g.); Trifonov (yellow card) 8'; Popov (yellow card) 73'	Report	Yurukov 9' (pen.); Ademar 83'; Yurukov (yellow card) 20'; Dimov (yellow card) 20'; S. Stoyanov (yellow card) 39'; Ademar (yellow card) 41'; Eli Marques (yellow card) 84'; Coulibaly (yellow card) 90+3'	Stadium: Balgarska Armiya; Attendance: 7,500; Referee: Georgi Yordanov

16 May 2010 30	Chernomorets	2–0	CSKA	Burgas
18:00 EET	Fernández 7'; González 51'; Márcio Abreu (yellow card) 60'; Hajri (yellow card) 86'	Report	S. Petrov (yellow card) 53'; Saidhodzha (yellow card) 71'	Stadium: Lazur; Attendance: 14,770; Referee: Atanas Dimitrov

=== Bulgarian Cup ===
25 November 2009 Second Round	Svilengrad	0–1	CSKA	Svilengrad
13:30 EET		Report	Michel Platini 76'; Kotev (yellow card) 90+1'	Stadium: Kolodruma; Attendance: 2,500; Referee: Tsvetan Krastev

12 December 2009 Third Round	CSKA	1–0	Litex	Sofia
16:00 EET	Delev 48'; Rui Miguel (yellow card) 24'; Timonov (yellow card) 51'; Minev (yellow card) 66'	Report	Popov (yellow card) 22'; Kishishev (yellow card) 44'; Nikolov (yellow card) 62'	Stadium: Balgarska Armiya; Attendance: 1,000; Referee: Aleksandar Kostadinov

31 March 2010 Quarterfinal	Beroe	1–0	CSKA	Stara Zagora
16:00 EET	Pisarov 73'; Genchev (yellow card) 45'	Report	Minev (yellow card) 69'; Saidhodzha (yellow card) 84'	Stadium: Beroe; Attendance: 6,900; Referee: Stefan Spasov

=== Europa League ===
==== Third qualifying round ====
30 July 2009 First leg	CSKA (Bulgaria)	1–0	(Republic of Ireland) Derry City	Sofia, Bulgaria
20:00 EET	I. Stoyanov 75'; I. Ivanov (yellow card) 3'; Marquinhos (yellow card) 48'; I. Stoyanov (yellow card) 90+1'	Report	Doherty (yellow card) 72'; Gray (yellow card) 73'	Stadium: Vasil Levski; Attendance: 10,500; Referee: Selçuk Dereli (Turkey)

6 August 2009 Second leg	Derry City (Republic of Ireland)	1–1 (1–2 agg.)	(Bulgaria) CSKA	Derry City, Republic of Ireland
21:00 EET	Scullion 82'; Gray (yellow card) 27'; Molloy (yellow card) 68'; McGlynn (red card) 87'	Report	Marquinhos 71'; Marquinhos (yellow card) 15'; I. Stoyanov (yellow card) 51'; Vidanov (yellow card) 67'; Karadzhov (yellow card) 76'	Stadium: Brandywell Stadium; Attendance: 2,700; Referee: Jérôme Efong Nzolo (Belgium)

==== Play-off round ====
20 August 2009 First leg	CSKA (Bulgaria)	0–0	(Russia) Dynamo Moscow	Sofia, Bulgaria
20:00 EET	Orlinov (yellow card) 45'; Yanchev (yellow card) 81'	Report	Fernández (yellow card) 42'; Kombarov (yellow card) 45'; Roptan (yellow card) 90+2'	Stadium: Vasil Levski; Attendance: 23,250; Referee: Robert Schörgenhofer (Austria)

27 August 2009 Second leg	Dynamo Moscow (Russia)	1–2 (1–2 agg.)	(Bulgaria) CSKA	Moscow, Russia
19:00 EET	Kerzhakov 10'; Kombarov (yellow card) 86'	Report	Delev 14'; I. Ivanov 55'	Stadium: Arena Khimki; Attendance: 8,486; Referee: Michael Weiner (Germany)

==== Group stage ====
Pos	Team	Pld	W	D	L	GF	GA	GD	Pts	Qualification	ROM	FUL	BSL	CSK
1	(Italy) Roma	6	4	1	1	10	5	+5	13	Advance to knockout phase	—	2–1	2–1	2–0
2	(England) Fulham	6	3	2	1	8	6	+2	11	Advance to knockout phase	1–1	—	1–0	1–0
3	(Switzerland) Basel	6	3	0	3	10	7	+3	9		2–0	2–3	—	3–1
4	(Bulgaria) CSKA Sofia	6	0	1	5	2	12	−10	1		0–3	1–1	0–2	—

Source: Soccerway

17 September 2009 1	CSKA (Bulgaria)	1–1	(England) Fulham	Sofia, Bulgaria
20:00 EET	Michel Platini 62'; Minev (yellow card) 30'; Michel Platini (yellow card) 90'; Marquinhos (yellow card) 90+3'	Report	Kamara 65'; Greening (yellow card) 23'; Smalling (yellow card) 47'; Kamara (yellow card) 89'	Stadium: Vasil Levski; Attendance: 32,000; Referee: Darko Čeferin (Slovenia)

1 October 2009 2	Roma (Italy)	2–0	(Bulgaria) CSKA	Rome, Italy
22:05 EET	Okaka Chuka 20'; Perrotta 23'; Menez (yellow card) 90+2'	Report		Stadium: Stadio Olimpico; Attendance: 16,027; Referee: Vladimír Hriňák (Slovakia)

22 October 2009 3	CSKA (Bulgaria)	0–2	(Switzerland) Basel	Sofia, Bulgaria
22:05 EET	Todorov (yellow card) 67'; Branekov (yellow card) 70'	Report	Frei 20', 63'; Safari (yellow card) 34'	Stadium: Vasil Levski; Attendance: 17,664; Referee: Miguel de Sousa (Portugal)

5 November 2009 4	Basel (Switzerland)	3–1	(Bulgaria) CSKA	Basel, Switzerland
22:05 EET	Gelabert 28'; Frei 41' (pen.), 67'	Report	Yanchev 61'; K. Stoyanov (yellow card) 15'; Morozs (yellow card) 19'	Stadium: St. Jakob-Park; Attendance: 15,255; Referee: Oleg Oriekhov (Ukraine)

3 December 2009 5	Fulham (England)	1–0	(Bulgaria) CSKA	London, England
22:05 EET	Murphy (penalty missed); Gera 15'; Baird (yellow card) 41'; Paintsil (yellow card) 81'	Report	Morozs (yellow card) 36'; Minev (yellow card) 63'; K. Stoyanov (yellow card) 89'	Stadium: Craven Cottage; Attendance: 23,604; Referee: Pavel Cristian Balaj (Romania)

16 December 2009 6	CSKA (Bulgaria)	0–3	(Italy) Roma	Sofia, Bulgaria
20:00 EET	S. Petrov (yellow card) 28'; K. Stoyanov (yellow card) 55'	Report	Cerci 45', 52'; Scardina 89'; Okaka Chuka (yellow card) 29'; Cerci (yellow card) 29'	Stadium: Vasil Levski; Attendance: 10,000; Referee: Aleksandar Stavrev (Republic of Macedonia)

== See also ==
- PFC CSKA Sofia
