= Atanasov =

Atanasov (Cyrillic: Атанасов), feminine Atanasova (Cyrillic:Атанасова), also transliterated as Atanassov/Atanassova, is a Bulgarian-language surname, derived from the name Atanas. Notable people with this surname include:

- Alfredo Atanasof, Argentine politician, born 1949
- Andrey Atanasov, Bulgarian footballer, 1987
- Atanas Atanasov, runner, born 1945
- Atanas Atanasov, Bulgarian long jumper, born 1956
- Atanas Atanasov, Bulgarian footballer, born 1985
- Atanas Atanasov, Bulgarian politician and activist, born 1990
- Atanas Atanasov, Bulgarian footballer, born 2005
- Chavdar Atanasov, Bulgarian footballer, born 1973
- Dimo Atanasov, Bulgarian footballer, born 1985
- Dimitar Atanasov (canoeist), Bulgarian sprint canoer
- Doncho Atanasov, Bulgarian footballer, born 1983
- Gavril Atanasov, 19th century Yugoslavian icon painter
- Georgi Atanasov (composer), Bulgarian composer, 1882 – 1931
- Georgi Atanasov (politician), Bulgarian politician and Prime Minister from 1986 - 1990
- Hristo Atanassov (born 1965), Bulgarian politician
- Hristo Atanasov (Dikanya), Bulgarian revolutionary, 1877 - 1908
- Jani Atanasov, Macedonian footballer, born 1999
- John Vincent Atanasoff, American physicist and one of the inventors of the computer, 1903 - 1995.
- Kosta Atanasov, a Bulgarian teacher and revolutionary, 1870 - 1912
- Krassimir Atanassov (born 1954), Bulgarian mathematician
- Manol Atanassov (born 1991), Bulgarian figure skater
- Myléna Atanassova (born 1963), Bulgarian fashion designer and painter
- Nikola Atanasov, Bulgarian revolutionary and politician, 1886 - 1945
- Nikolay Atanasov, long jumper, born 1974
- Petar Atanasov (footballer), Bulgarian footballer, born 1990
- Petar Atanasov (linguist), Macedonian linguist, born 1939
- Slavcho Atanasov, Bulgarian politician and mayor of Plovdiv, 2007 - 2011
- Stanimir Atanasov, Bulgarian sprint canoer, born 1976
- Tsvetan Atanasov, Bulgarian football player, born 1948
- Valentin Atanasov, Bulgarian sprinter, born 1961
- Vasko Atanasov, Macedonian basketball coach, born 1994
- Zhivko Atanasov, Bulgarian footballer, born 1991
