= Atanas =

Atanas is a masculine given name in Bulgarian and Macedonian, derived from Greek Athanasios, "immortal". People with the name Atanas include:

- Atanas Andonov (born 1955), Bulgarian decathlete
- Atanas Angelov, Bulgarian sprint canoer
- Atanas Apostolov (born 1989), Bulgarian football winger
- Atanas Atanasov (disambiguation), multiple people, including:
  - Atanas Atanasov (footballer, born 1985) (born 1985), Bulgarian footballer
  - Atanas Atanasov (long jumper) (born 1956), Bulgarian retired long jumper
  - Atanas Atanasov (runner) (born 1945), Bulgarian retired runner
  - Atanas Atanasov (cyclist) (born 1904, date of death unknown), Bulgarian cyclist
  - Atanas Atanasov (football manager) (born 1963), Bulgarian footballer and football coach and manager
- Atanas Badev (1860–1908), Bulgarian composer and music teacher
- Atanas Bornosuzov (born 1979), Bulgarian football midfielder
- Atanas Chipilov (born 1987), Bulgarian footballer
- Atanas Chochev (born 1957), Bulgarian triple jumper and long jumper
- Atanas Dalchev (1904–1978), Bulgarian poet, critic and translator
- Atanas Drenovichki (born 1990), Bulgarian football defender
- Atanas Dzhambazki (born 1969), Bulgarian football player and manager
- Atanas Fidanin (born 1986), Bulgarian footballer
- Atanas Gerov (born 1945), Bulgarian footballer
- Atanas Golomeev, Bulgarian basketball player
- Atanas Katchamakoff (1898–1988), Bulgarian-American sculptor, woodcarver, and illustrator
- Atanas Keya, Kenyan politician
- Atanas Kirov (1946–2017), Bulgarian bantamweight weightlifter
- Atanas Kolev (born 1967), Bulgarian chess Grandmaster
- Atanas Komchev (1959–1994), Bulgarian wrestler
- Atanas Krastev (born 1993), Bulgarian footballer
- Atanas Kurdov (born 1988), Bulgarian football forward
- Atanas Mihaylov (1949–2006), Bulgarian football former forward and manager
- Atanas Nikolov (born 1977), Bulgarian footballer
- Atanas Nikolovski (born 1980), Macedonian slalom canoer
- Atanas Paparizov (born 1951), Bulgarian politician
- Atanas Pashev (born 1963), Bulgarian football winger
- Atanas Semerdzhiev (1924–2015), Bulgarian politician
- Atanas Shopov (born 1951), Bulgarian weightlifter
- Atanas Tarev (born 1958), Bulgarian pole vaulter
- Atanas Uzunov (born 1955), Bulgarian football referee
- Atanas Zafirov (born 1971), Bulgarian politician
- Atanas Zapryanov (born 1950), Bulgarian politician
- Atanas Zehirov (born 1989), Bulgarian football right back

== See also ==
- Atanasov
- Atanasoff
- Atanasije
