= Keya =

Keya may refer to:

- Kolya, Iran, a village in Mazandaran Province
- Keya Creek (Chinese: 客雅溪; pinyin: Kèyǎ Xī), a creek in northern Taiwan
- KEYA, a National Public Radio member public radio station in Belcourt, North Dakota
- Atanas Keya, a Kenyan politician
- Keya (actress), a Bangladeshi actress
- Keya Group, a Bangladesh conglomerate

== See also ==
- Keya Paha County, Nebraska
