= Atana (disambiguation) =

Atana is a musical scale in Indian classical music.

Atana may also refer to:

- Atana, village in Aksy District, Kyrgyzstan
- Atana (monarch), ruler of Hariphunchai, Thailand
- At(h)ana Potinija, a Mycenaean term from Linear B tablets that may be an early reference to the goddess Athena

== See also ==
- Atanas, given name
