= Berovo Lake =

Artificial lake in North Macedonia

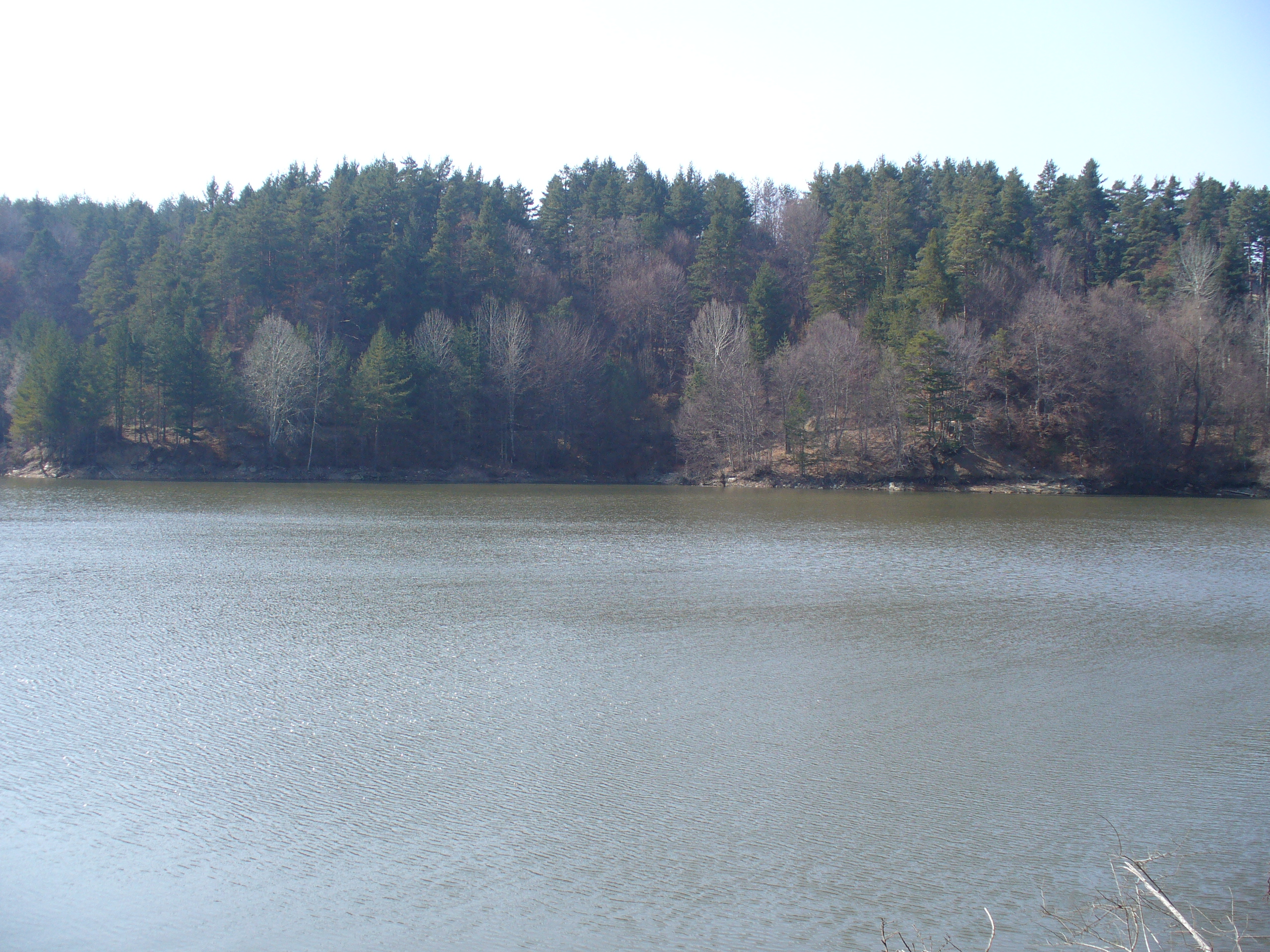

- Location within North Macedonia
- Interactive map of Berovo Lake
- Coordinates: 41°40′08″N 22°54′22″E
- Lake type: Artificial
- Primary inflows: Klepalska river
- Primary outflows: Klepalska river
- Basin countries: Republic of North Macedonia
- Max. length: 2,500 m (8,200 ft)
- Max. width: 350 m (1,150 ft)
- Surface area: 75 ha (190 acres)
- Max. depth: 58 m (190 ft) (dam -2 m)
- Surface elevation: 990 m (3,250 ft)

Berovo Lake is a freshwater lake located in the Republic of North Macedonia.

The lake lies near the town of Berovo. The lake is surrounded by evergreen and deciduous type species of forests. Many locals go swimming, fishing, or sailing in the lake. The forested areas that surround the lake are protected by the Macedonian Forestry Police. Illegal cutting down forested areas for fire is prohibited in most areas of the country.
