= Jonathan Gómez =

Jonathan Gómez may refer to:

- Jonathan Gómez (Paraguayan footballer) (born 1985), Paraguayan football midfielder
- Jonathan Gómez (Argentine footballer) (born 1989), Argentine football attacking midfielder
- Jonathan Gómez (swimmer) (born 1996), Colombian swimmer
- Jonathan Gómez (soccer, born 2003), American soccer left-back
