= Zdravko Chavdarov =

Bulgarian footballer

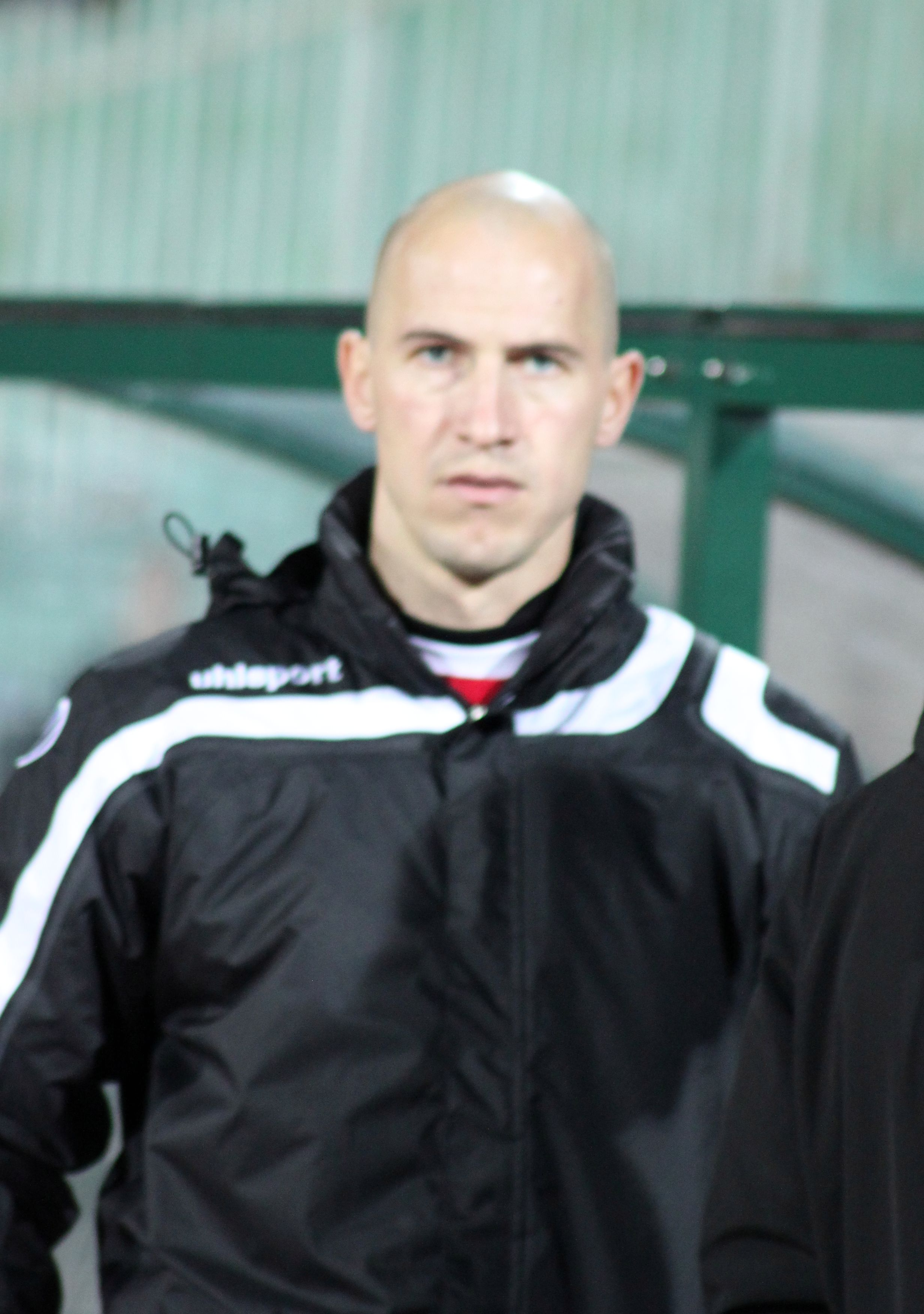

Personal information
- Full name: Zdravko Milkov Chavdarov
- Date of birth: 24 January 1981 (age 45)
- Place of birth: Smolyan, Bulgaria
- Height: 1.86 m (6 ft 1 in)
- Position: Goalkeeper

Youth career
- Maritsa Plovdiv

Senior career*
Years	Team	Apps	(Gls)
2003–2004	Maritsa Plovdiv	0	(0)
2004–2008	Rodopa Smolyan	60	(0)
2008–2009	Sliven 2000	28	(0)
2009–2012	CSKA Sofia	21	(0)
2013	Botev Vratsa	8	(0)
2014	Lyubimets 2007	3	(0)
2015	Rakovski	0	(0)
- * Club domestic league appearances and goals

Zdravko Chavdarov (Bulgarian: Здравко Чавдаров; born 24 January 1981) is a Bulgarian footballer, currently playing as a goalkeeper for Rakovski.

== Career ==
Zdravko started his career in Maritsa. In 2004, he moved to Rodopa on a free transfer and spent 4 years there. After the promotion of Sliven 2000 to the Bulgarian top division, he joined them and was first-choice goalkeeper for the whole 2008/09 season.

=== CSKA Sofia ===
On 24 June 2009, Chavdarov signed with CSKA Sofia along with his teammates Ivan Stoyanov, Kostadin Stoyanov and Kosta Yanev. On 30 July 2009, he managed a clean sheet in his official debut for the Armymen in a 1–0 home win against Northern Irish side Derry City. However, his debut for CSKA in the league was postponed after he sustained a head injury in the return leg against the Northern Irish team. Chavdarov subsequently lost his place in the first team in favour of Ivan Karadzhov, following the latter's convincing displays. However, after Karadzhov started running through a bad patch of form, Chavdarov finally made his first appearance in the league for CSKA on 1 November 2009, in a 0–2 away loss to Litex Lovech. On 27 March 2010, he played in his first Eternal Derby against Levski Sofia and kept a clean sheet for a 0–0 draw.
