= Atanas (disambiguation) =

Atanas is a given name.

Atanas may also refer to:

- Atanas (fortress), fortress in Serbia
- Walt Atanas (1923–1991), Canadian ice hockey right winger
