= Atanas Atanasov =

Atanas Atanasov may refer to:

- Atanas Atanasov (basketball) (1935–2021), Bulgarian basketball player
- Atanas Atanasov (footballer, born 1985), Bulgarian footballer
- Atanas Atanasov (long jumper) (born 1956), Bulgarian retired long jumper
- Atanas Atanasov (runner) (born 1945), Bulgarian retired runner
- Atanas Atanasov (cyclist) (1904–?), Bulgarian cyclist
- Atanas Atanasov (footballer, born 1969), Bulgarian footballer and football coach and manager
- Atanas Atanasov (footballer, born 2005), Bulgarian footballer
- Atanas Atanasov (wrestler) (born 1963), Bulgarian Olympic wrestler
- Atanas Atanasov (politician, born 1959), Bulgarian politician
- Atanas Atanasov (politician, born 1990), Bulgarian politician
