= Hugo Báez =

Paraguayan footballer (born 1988)

Personal information
- Full name: Hugo Rafael Freytas Báez
- Date of birth: 23 June 1988 (age 38)
- Place of birth: Asunción, Paraguay
- Height: 1.85 m (6 ft 1 in)
- Position: Left-back

Team information
- Current team: Independiente F.B.C.

Youth career
- Tacuary

Senior career*
Years	Team	Apps	(Gls)
2004–2006	Tacuary		
2006–2009	Sportivo Iteño		
2009–2010	CSKA Sofia	3	(0)
2010–2011	Club Olimpia	2	(0)
2012	Sportivo Carapeguá	10	(0)
2012	Independiente F.B.C.	5	(0)
2013	Sol de América	14	(0)
2014	Rubio Ñu	4	(0)
2015	Deportivo Capiatá	5	(0)
- * Club domestic league appearances and goals as of 16 December 2012

Hugo Báez (born 23 June 1988, in Asunción) is a Paraguayan footballer. He currently plays for Independiente F.B.C.

Báez is a left back who also plays as a center back. His nickname is the Tank.

== Career ==
Báez began his career at Tacuary. He later moved to Sportivo Iteño. In the summer of 2009, Báez relocated to Bulgaria together with his compatriot Jonathan Gómez to join a trial period with CSKA Sofia. Two months later he signed a contract with The Reds from Sofia and was registered for the European tournaments. Báez made his competitive debut for CSKA in their UEFA Europa League group stage match against FC Basel on 5 November 2009.
