= Spas Delev =

Bulgarian footballer (born 1989)

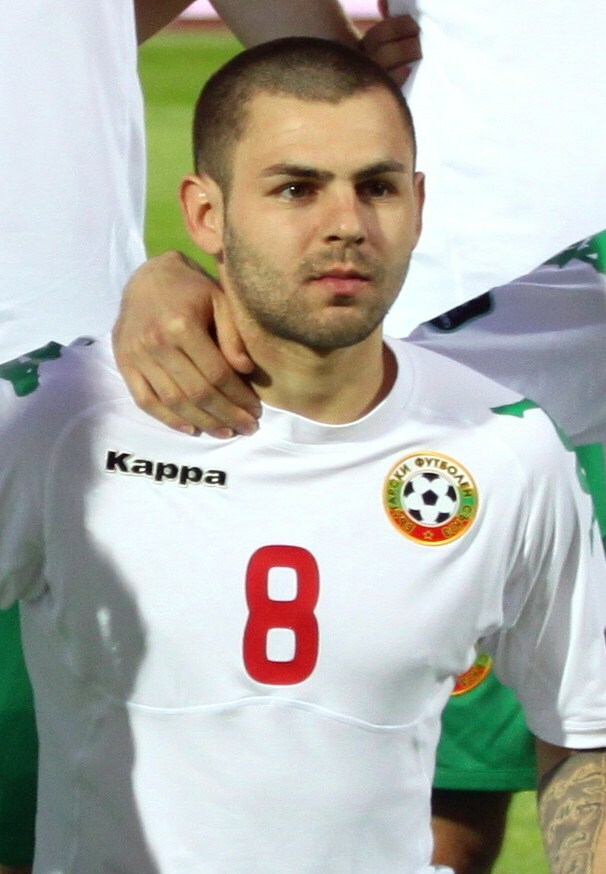
- Delev with Bulgaria in 2011

Personal information
- Full name: Spas Borislavov Delev
- Date of birth: 22 September 1989 (age 37)
- Place of birth: Klyuch, Bulgaria
- Height: 1.69 m (5 ft 6 1/2 in)
- Positions: Winger; forward

Team information
- Current team: Lokomotiv Sofia
- Number: 7

Youth career
- 1997–2006: Belasitsa Petrich
- 2006–2008: Pirin Blagoevgrad

Senior career*
| Years | Team | Apps | (Gls) |
| 2008–2010 | Pirin Blagoevgrad | 26 | (11) |
| 2009–2010 | → CSKA Sofia (loan) | 26 | (2) |
| 2010–2012 | CSKA Sofia | 39 | (16) |
| 2012 | Mersin İdmanyurdu | 12 | (2) |
| 2013 | CSKA Sofia | 14 | (5) |
| 2013 | Las Palmas | 6 | (0) |
| 2014–2015 | Lokomotiv Plovdiv | 22 | (2) |
| 2015–2016 | Beroe Stara Zagora | 29 | (7) |
| 2016–2019 | Pogoń Szczecin | 72 | (11) |
| 2019–2021 | Arda Kardzhali | 63 | (14) |
| 2021–2024 | Ludogorets Razgrad | 80 | (13) |
| 2021–2024 | Ludogorets Razgrad II | 8 | (1) |
| 2025– | Lokomotiv Sofia | 54 | (15) |

International career
| 2008–2011 | Bulgaria U21 | 2 | (0) |
| 2011–2023 | Bulgaria | 47 | (5) |
- * Club domestic league appearances and goals as of 11 June 2026

Spas Borislavov Delev (Bulgarian: Спас Бориславов Делев; born 22 September 1989) is a Bulgarian professional footballer who plays as a winger or forward for First League club Lokomotiv Sofia.

== Club career ==
=== Youth career ===
Born in Klyuch, part of Petrich Municipality, Delev started to play football in Pirin. During the season 2007–08 he played for the team in the Bulgarian amateur division. Pirin took first place and were promoted to the "B" professional football group. On 9 August 2008 Delev made his debut in professional football in a match against Botev Krivodol. In this match he scored his first goal in B PFG. In the first half of 2008–09 season Delev scored 8 goals in 16 matches.

=== New Pirin ===
After the union of the two Pirin clubs from Blagoevgrad in December 2008, Delev joined the part of the team, which plays in the top division. On 4 March 2009, he scored a goal in a match against CSKA Sofia for the Bulgarian Cup and Pirin eliminated their opponent. In the semi-final of that tournament against Levski, Delev had a tragic accident. After a spasm of the lungs he remained lying on the grass, and was later sent to the emergency hospital. It was later found that he had played while suffering from the flu.

Delev made his A PFG debut on 8 March, in a match against Cherno More. On 5 April, he scored twice against Belasitsa Petrich. Those were his first goals in A PFG. On 11 June, Delev was named the Best Young Footballer of the 2008–09 season in Bulgaria. Just 19, Delev's goals helped Pirin to reach the Bulgarian Cup final.

=== CSKA Sofia ===
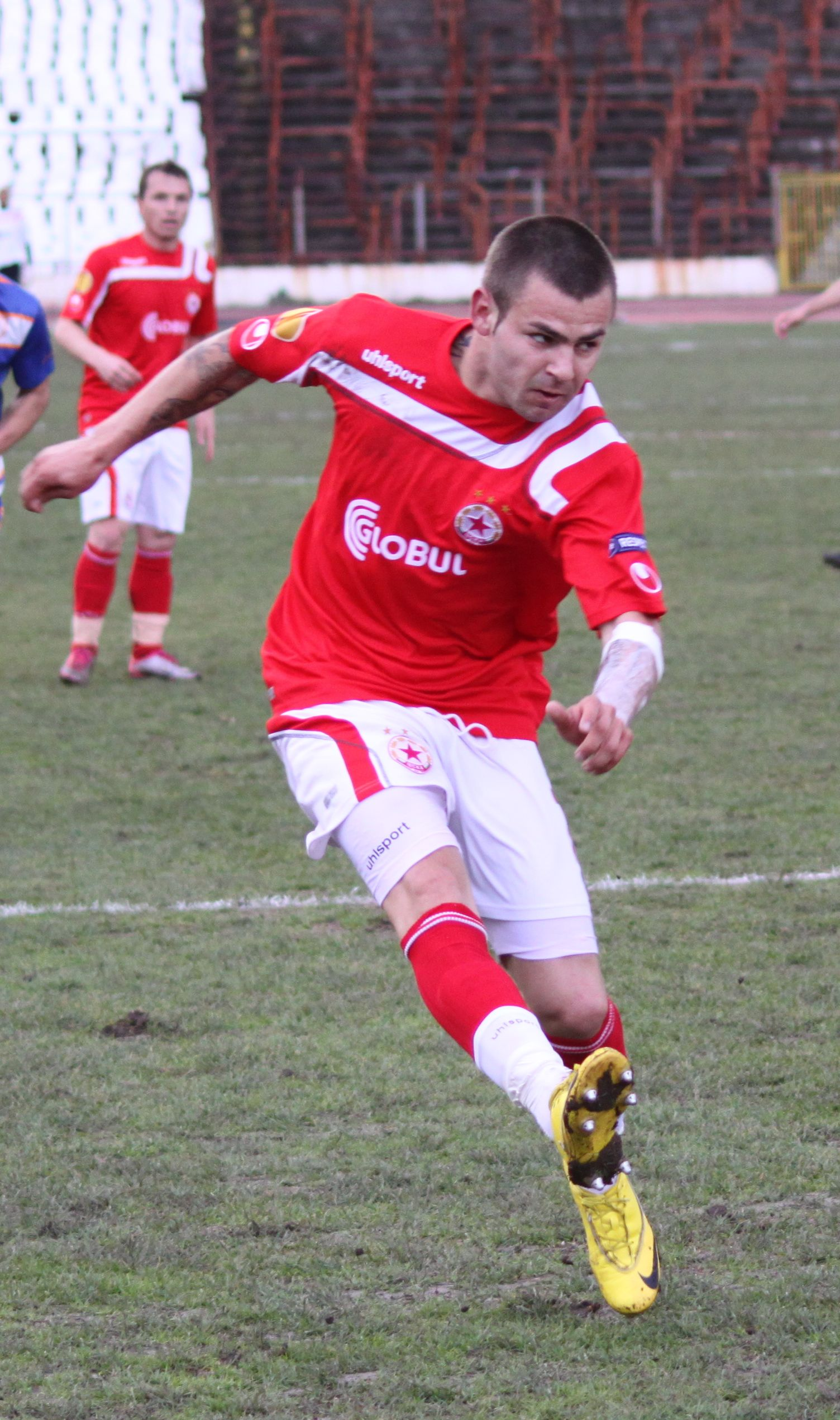
Delev playing for CSKA in 2010

On 27 June 2009, Delev joined CSKA on one-year loan for 2009–10 and later signed a three-year contract. He scored his first goal for CSKA in the second-leg of the UEFA Europa League play-off of against Dynamo Moscow on 27 August 2009, bringing the score to 1–1 with a header. Delev netted the third goal in the victory over The New Saints in the UEFA Europa League play-off. On 16 December 2010, he found the net in a 1–3 away loss to F.C. Porto in the Europa League group stage. He also scored two goals in the Bulgarian Cup semi-final against Litex Lovech on 20 April 2011, as well as the winning goal against Slavia Sofia in the final on 25 May 2011. During the 2010–11 season he managed 13 goals in the league.

=== Mersin Idmanyurdu ===
On 12 January 2012, Delev signed a 3,5-year contract with Turkish side Mersin İdmanyurdu. Delev's debut came on 15 January, in a 0–2 home loss against Antalyaspor in a Süper Lig match, during which he appeared as a second-half substitute. On 24 January, Delev netted his first goal for the team, opening the scoring in a 1–2 home loss against Kayserispor. In June 2012, he dissolved his contract due to financial reasons.

=== CSKA Sofia ===
After seven months without a club, Delev returned to CSKA Sofia on 31 January 2013.

=== Las Palmas ===
On 30 July 2013, Delev completed his move to Las Palmas on a free transfer. He signed a two-year contract and was given the number 22 shirt.

=== Pogoń Szczecin ===
On 20 June 2016, Delev signed for Polish side Pogoń Szczecin on a three-year contract. He made his Ekstraklasa debut on 16 July, replacing Mateusz Lewandowski in the 66th minute of Pogoń's 2–1 loss against Wisła Kraków. He scored his first goal in a 4–0 away win against Kalisz in a game of Polish Cup on 10 August. His first league goals for Pogon came on 29 October when he scored twice in a 2–1 home win over Ruch Chorzów. He scored a brace in a 2–4 away win against Nieciecza, on 17 March 2018.

=== Ludogorets Razgrad ===
In December 2021, Delev joined Ludogorets Razgrad.

=== Lokomotiv Sofia ===
On 31 December 2024, he was confirmed as a new signing of Lokomotiv Sofia.

== International career ==
In October 2008, the Bulgaria under-21s manager Ivan Kolev called Delev into the Bulgaria U21 team for the friendly matches with Greece and Macedonia.

He made his debut for the senior side on 26 March 2011, in the UEFA Euro 2012 qualifying match against Switzerland. On 4 June 2011, he came on as a substitute in the qualifier against Montenegro.

His first Bulgaria goals came on his 14th appearance on 25 March 2017, scoring twice in the 2018 FIFA World Cup qualifying match against Netherlands, which ended in a 2–0 victory.

== Career statistics ==
=== Club ===
As of 8 August 2026

| Club | Season | League | | | National Cup | | Continental | | Other | | Total | |
| Club | Season | Division | Apps | Goals | Apps | Goals | Apps | Goals | Apps | Goals | Apps | Goals |
|---|---|---|---|---|---|---|---|---|---|---|---|---|
| Pirin Blagoevgrad | 2007–08 | A Group | 14 | 8 | 0 | 0 | — | | — | | 14 | 8 |
| Pirin Blagoevgrad | 2008–09 | A Group | 12 | 3 | 3 | 1 | — | | — | | 15 | 4 |
| Pirin Blagoevgrad | Total | | 26 | 11 | 3 | 1 | – | | – | | 29 | 12 |
| CSKA Sofia | 2009–10 | A Group | 26 | 2 | 3 | 1 | 7 (Note: Appearances in UEFA Europa League) | 1 | — | | 36 | 4 |
| CSKA Sofia | 2010–11 | A Group | 26 | 13 | 4 | 6 | 8 | 2 | — | | 38 | 21 |
| CSKA Sofia | 2011–12 | A Group | 13 | 3 | 2 | 2 | 2 | 0 | — | | 16 | 5 |
| CSKA Sofia | Total | | 65 | 18 | 9 | 9 | 17 | 3 | — | | 90 | 30 |
| Mersin İdmanyurdu | 2011–12 | Süper Lig | 12 | 2 | 0 | 0 | — | | — | | 12 | 2 |
| CSKA Sofia | 2012–13 | A Group | 14 | 5 | 2 | 0 | — | | — | | 16 | 5 |
| Las Palmas | 2013–14 | Segunda División | 6 | 0 | 1 | 0 | — | | — | | 7 | 0 |
| Lokomotiv Plovdiv | 2013–14 | A Group | 13 | 1 | 3 | 0 | — | | — | | 16 | 1 |
| Lokomotiv Plovdiv | 2014–15 | A Group | 9 | 1 | 4 | 2 | — | | — | | 13 | 3 |
| Lokomotiv Plovdiv | Total | | 22 | 2 | 7 | 2 | — | | — | | 29 | 4 |
| Beroe Stara Zagora | 2015–16 | A Group | 29 | 4 | 4 | 0 | 4 | 4 | — | | 37 | 8 |
| Beroe Stara Zagora | 2016–17 | A Group | 0 | 0 | 0 | 0 | 0 | 0 | — | | 0 | 0 |
| Beroe Stara Zagora | Total | | 29 | 4 | 4 | 0 | 4 | 4 | — | | 37 | 8 |
| Pogoń Szczecin | 2016–17 | Ekstraklasa | 30 | 4 | 5 | 1 | — | | — | | 35 | 5 |
| Pogoń Szczecin | 2017–18 | Ekstraklasa | 28 | 5 | 1 | 0 | — | | — | | 29 | 5 |
| Pogoń Szczecin | 2018–19 | Ekstraklasa | 14 | 2 | 0 | 0 | — | | — | | 14 | 2 |
| Pogoń Szczecin | Total | | 72 | 11 | 6 | 1 | — | | — | | 78 | 12 |
| Arda Kardzhali | 2019–20 | First League | 19 | 1 | 2 | 0 | — | | — | | 21 | 1 |
| Arda Kardzhali | 2020–21 | First League | 26 | 8 | 5 | 2 | — | | — | | 31 | 10 |
| Arda Kardzhali | 2021–22 | First League | 18 | 5 | 2 | 1 | 2 (Note: Appearances in UEFA Conference League) | 0 | — | | 22 | 6 |
| Arda Kardzhali | Total | | 63 | 14 | 9 | 3 | 2 | 0 | — | | 74 | 17 |
| Ludogorets Razgrad | 2021–22 | First League | 11 | 1 | 1 | 0 | 0 | 0 | 0 | 0 | 12 | 1 |
| Ludogorets Razgrad | 2022–23 | First League | 30 | 7 | 4 | 1 | 15 (Note: Six appearances in UEFA Champions League, seven appearances in UEFA Europa League, two appearances in UEFA Conference League) | 0 | 0 | 0 | 49 | 8 |
| Ludogorets Razgrad | 2023–24 | First League | 28 | 3 | 3 | 1 | 14 (Note: Four appearances in UEFA Champions League, four appearances in UEFA Europa League, six appearances in UEFA Conference League) | 0 | 0 | 0 | 45 | 4 |
| Ludogorets Razgrad | 2024–25 | First League | 11 | 2 | 2 | 1 | 4 (Note: Appearances in UEFA Champions League) | 1 | 0 | 0 | 17 | 4 |
| Ludogorets Razgrad | Total | | 80 | 13 | 10 | 3 | 33 | 1 | 0 | 0 | 124 | 17 |
| Ludogorets Razgrad II | 2022–23 | Second League | 1 | 0 | — | | — | | — | | 1 | 0 |
| Ludogorets Razgrad II | 2023–24 | Second League | 2 | 0 | — | | — | | — | | 2 | 0 |
| Ludogorets Razgrad II | 2024–25 | Second League | 5 | 1 | — | | — | | — | | 5 | 1 |
| Ludogorets Razgrad II | Total | | 8 | 1 | 0 | 0 | 0 | 0 | 0 | 0 | 8 | 1 |
| Lokomotiv Sofia | 2024–25 | First League | 18 | 7 | 0 | 0 | — | | — | | 18 | 7 |
| Lokomotiv Sofia | 2025–26 | First League | 36 | 8 | 1 | 1 | — | | — | | 37 | 9 |
| Lokomotiv Sofia | 2025–26 | First League | 4 | 2 | 0 | 0 | — | | — | | 4 | 2 |
| Lokomotiv Sofia | Total | | 58 | 17 | 1 | 1 | 0 | 0 | 0 | 0 | 59 | 18 |
| Career total | | | 452 | 98 | 52 | 20 | 56 | 8 | 0 | 0 | 560 | 126 |

=== International ===
As of match played 16 November 2023

Bulgaria
| Year | Apps | Goals |
|---|---|---|
| 2011 | 5 | 0 |
| 2013 | 4 | 0 |
| 2016 | 4 | 0 |
| 2017 | 5 | 2 |
| 2018 | 4 | 0 |
| 2019 | 3 | 0 |
| 2020 | 4 | 0 |
| 2021 | 6 | 1 |
| 2022 | 3 | 1 |
| 2023 | 9 | 1 |
| Total | 47 | 5 |

==== International goals ====
Scores and results list Bulgaria's goal tally first.

| No. | Date | Venue | Opponent | Score | Result | Competition |
|---|---|---|---|---|---|---|
| 1 | 25 March 2017 | Vasil Levski National Stadium, Sofia, Bulgaria | Netherlands | 1–0 | 2–0 | 2018 FIFA World Cup qualification |
| 2 | 25 March 2017 | Vasil Levski National Stadium, Sofia, Bulgaria | Netherlands | 2–0 | 2–0 | 2018 FIFA World Cup qualification |
| 3 | 8 September 2021 | Vasil Levski National Stadium, Sofia, Bulgaria | Georgia | 3–0 | 4–1 | Friendly |
| 4 | 16 November 2022 | AEK Arena – Georgios Karapatakis, Larnaca, Cyprus | Cyprus | 2–0 | 2–0 | Friendly |
| 5 | 16 November 2023 | Vasil Levski National Stadium, Sofia, Bulgaria | Hungary | 1–1 | 2–2 | UEFA Euro 2024 qualifying |

== Honours ==
Pirin Blagoevgrad

- Bulgarian Cup runner-up: 2009

CSKA Sofia

- Bulgarian Championship runner-up: 2010
- Bulgarian Cup: 2011

Arda Kardzhali

- Bulgarian Cup runner-up: 2021

Ludogorets Razgrad

- Bulgarian First League: 2021–22, 2022–23, 2023–24
- Bulgarian Supercup: 2022, 2023
- Bulgarian Cup: 2022–23

Individual

- Bulgarian Best Young Player of the Season: 2008–09
- Bulgarian First League Goal of the Week: 2021–22 (Week 3) v. Levski Sofia, (Week 13) v. CSKA 1948,
