= Gavril Atanasov =

Bulgarian painter

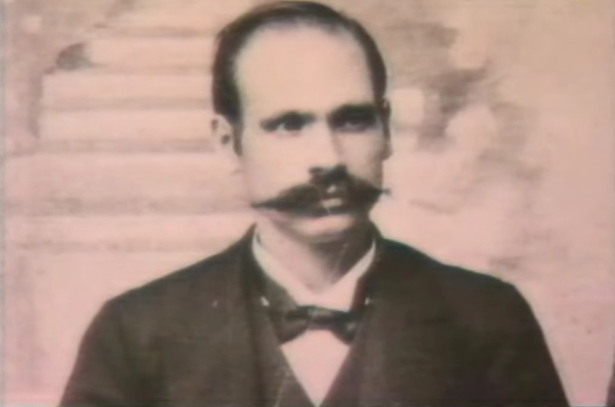
Gavril Atanasov

Gavril Atanasov (Bulgarian: Гаврил Атанасов) (1863–1951) was a prominent Bulgarian icon painter in the 19th century from Berovo (Malesh region), in Ottoman Vardar Macedonia (present-day North Macedonia). His father was from Kruševo but moved to Berovo where Gavril was born in 1863. Gavril went to the Bulgarian school in Berovo. He painted around Berovo (Malesh region). Gavril Atanasov was the author of the icon of St. Demetrius in the church "Saint Demetrius" in Kyustendil, Bulgaria.

One of the monasteries where his painting can be found is the St. Arhangel Mihail Monastery in Berovo.
