= Myléna Atanassova =

Bulgarian artist

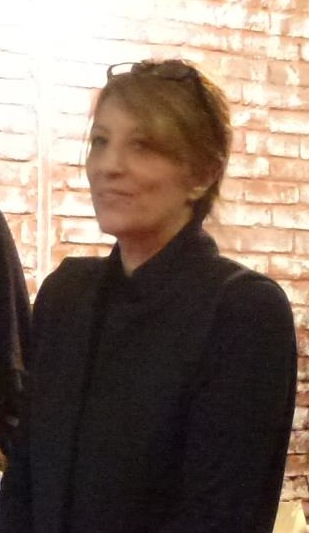
Photo profil de Mylena Atanassova, prise pendant le concours art et média "Réseaux proactif" - Paris.

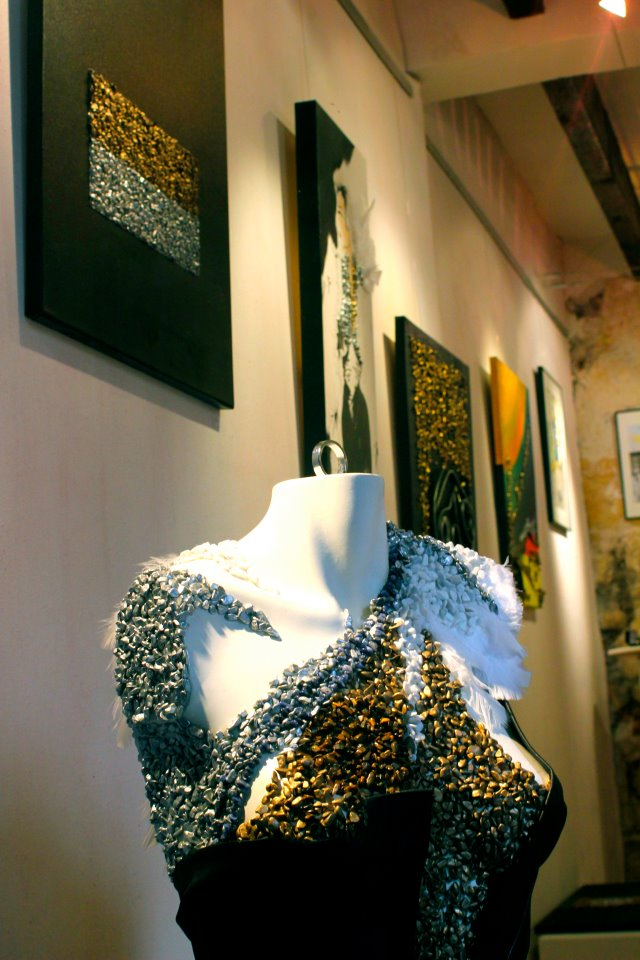
Photo Buste Mylèna Atanassova

Mylèna Atanassova, more usually called Mylène Atanassova, is a designer and a painter.

== Biography ==
Mylèna Atanassova, former TV presenter and producer of the show "Boutique à la maison" on the string "7dni.TV" in Sofia. She is also the author of the concept of the program "Official Register" in 1996.

Designer, she is the founder of the house "Milena-Art". In 1997 she staged fashion shows: "Storytelling for Adults" with the participation of Bogdana Karadocheva the National Palace of Culture in Sofia. A film is made and disseminated by the chain of two Bulgarian National Television.

From mid-2002, she joined the world of artists and designers: Givenchy, Lanvin, Louis Vuitton, Stella McCartney and she makes a long way in several collections of fashion giant - Alexander McQueen. She is also a painter and exhibited her paintings and her artistic ideas.

She currently lives in Paris, is a consultant and professor teaching visual art and fashion illustration. As a designer and painter, she devotes most of her time looking colors, materials, textures, and shapes. She uses her paintings to mixed media (paintings, collages, textiles, metal, leather, paper).

She exhibited in group shows at the chapel of Notre-Dame-des-Blancs-Coats in Paris, then the center of cultural tourism Montoire-Sur-Loire (Loir-et-Cher). Lately, she has exhibited individually in the Gallery of Colombier in the first district of Paris, Galleri Hagman - Stockholm, In My Room Galerie - Paris, Makuni Art Exhibition - Osaka
