= Rumen Trifonov =

Bulgarian footballer

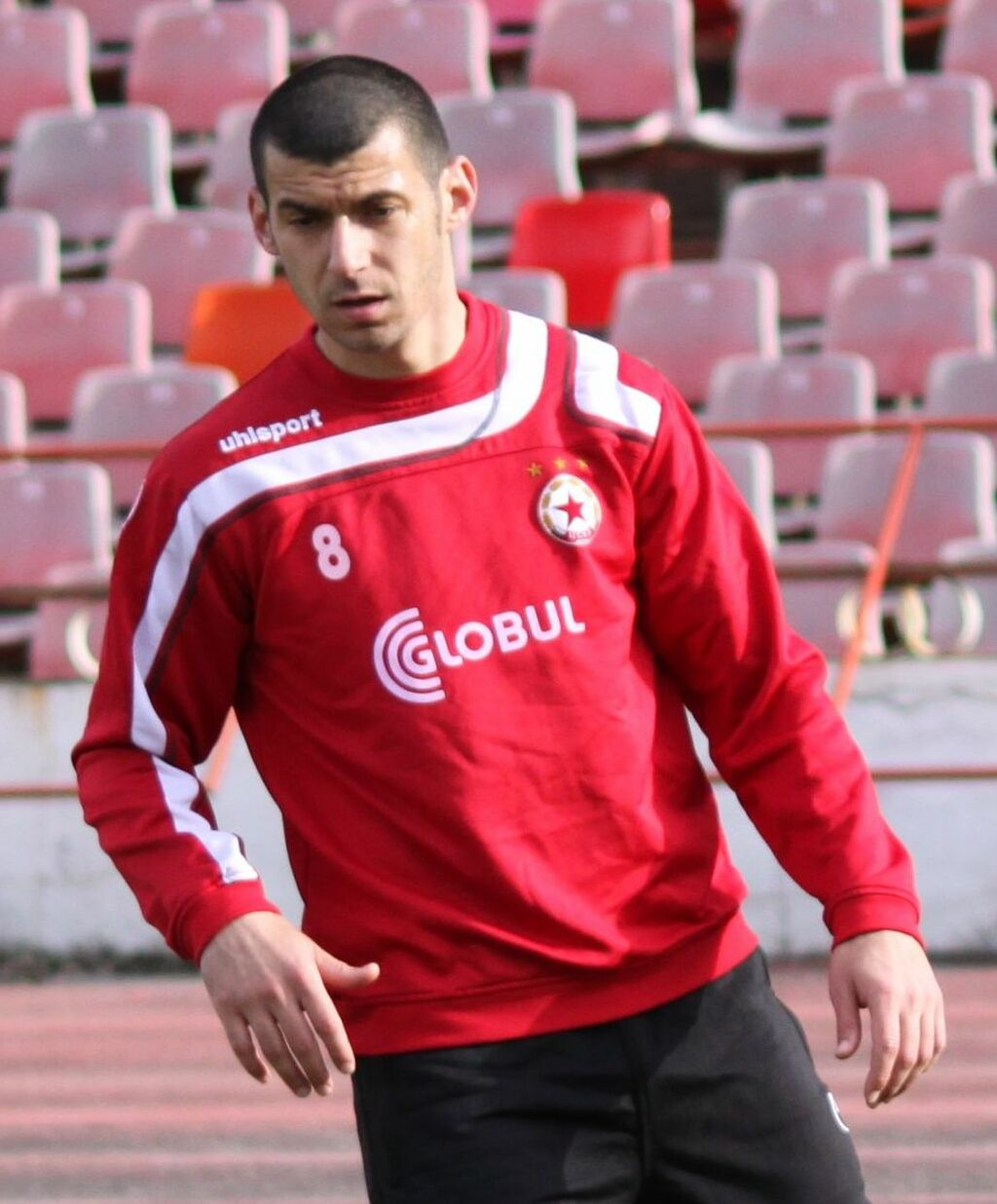
- Trifonov in 2010

Personal information
- Full name: Rumen Tsvetanov Trifonov
- Date of birth: 21 February 1985 (age 41)
- Place of birth: Kozloduy, Bulgaria
- Height: 1.80 m (5 ft 11 in)
- Positions: Left-back; left midfielder

Youth career
- 1997–2003: CSKA Sofia

Senior career*
Years	Team	Apps	(Gls)
2003–2004	CSKA Sofia	0	(0)
2004–2006	Conegliano	30	(0)
2007	Vihren Sandanski	1	(0)
2007–2009	Minyor Pernik	63	(4)
2010–2012	CSKA Sofia	57	(3)
2012	Chernomorets Burgas	3	(0)
2013–2015	Lokomotiv Sofia	65	(2)
2015–2017	Miedź Legnica	31	(0)
2016	Miedź Legnica II	4	(0)
2017	Septemvri Sofia	13	(0)
2018	Spartak Pleven	0	(0)
2018–2019	Montana	8	(0)
2019	Pirin Blagoevgrad	5	(0)
2020	Kostinbrod		
Total		280	(9)

Managerial career
- 2020–2024: CSKA Sofia (youth)
- 2024–2025: CSKA Sofia III
- * Club domestic league appearances and goals

Rumen Tsvetanov Trifonov (Bulgarian: Румен Цветанов Трифонов; born 21 February 1985) is a Bulgarian former professional footballer who played as a defender. He is currently working as a youth coach for CSKA Sofia.

== Career ==
Trifonov earned his first call-up to the Bulgaria national side in March 2011 for the Euro 2012 qualifier against Switzerland and the friendly match versus Cyprus, but did not feature in these games.

On 22 February 2018, Trifonov joined Third League club Spartak Pleven. In June 2018, he moved to Second League side Montana.

=== Later career ===
Missing most of the 2019–20 season due to an injury in the autumn 2019, 35-year old Trifonov decided to retire at the end of the year.

In February 2020, he returned to PFC CSKA Sofia as a youth coach, where he became head coach of the players from 2004 and would also help the U17 team. Beside that, he also signed for Kostinbrod in March 2020.

== Managerial statistics ==
As of 20 September 2025

Team	From	To	Record							
Team	From	To	G	W	D	L	Win %	GF	GA	GD
CSKA Sofia III	1 July 2024	24 September 2025	44	13	14	17	29.55	62	66	-4
Total			44	13	14	17	29.55	62	66	-4

== Honours ==
CSKA Sofia

- Bulgarian Cup: 2010–11
- Bulgarian Supercup: 2011
