= Hristo Atanasov =

Bulgarian revolutionary

- Born: 1877; Dikanya, today Bulgaria
- Died: 11 March 1908; Monastir, Ottoman Empire (now Bitola, North Macedonia)
- Cause of death: Execution by hanging
- Organization: IMARO

Hristo Atanasov was a Bulgarian revolutionary, a worker of the Internal Macedonian-Adrianople Revolutionary Organization (IMARO).

== Biography ==
Hristo Atanasov was born in the village of Dikanya, Radomir region, in 1877. After he finished elementary school, he worked in Sofia, where he became a member of the revolutionary organization IMARO. In 1904, he went to the region of Veles as a member of the revolutionary band of Ivan Naumov Alyabaka. He was a freedom fighter until the end of 1904, and later at the beginning of 1907, he became a leader for the Bitola revolutionary region. He was active in the agricultural villages of Pelagonia. In December 1907, he was captured, sentenced to death and hanged in March 1908 in Bitola.
