= Danail Mitev =

Bulgarian footballer

Danail Mitev Данаил Митев
Personal information
- Full name: Danail Mitev
- Date of birth: 11 January 1984 (age 42)
- Place of birth: Stara Zagora, Bulgaria
- Height: 1.82 m (6 ft 0 in)
- Position: Forward

Team information
- Current team: Mosta

Youth career
- Beroe Stara Zagora

Senior career*
| Years | Team | Apps | (Gls) |
| 2002–2007 | Beroe Stara Zagora | 113 | (16) |
| 2008–2010 | Lokomotiv Sofia | 56 | (6) |
| 2010–2011 | Bnei Sakhnin | 7 | (0) |
| 2011–2012 | Sliema Wanderers | 25 | (10) |
| 2012–2013 | Mosta | 29 | (12) |
- * Club domestic league appearances and goals as of 2 June 2013

Danail Mitev (Bulgarian: Данаил Митев; born 11 January 1984) is a Bulgarian footballer who currently plays as a forward for Mosta in the Maltese Premier League. He was raised in Beroe Stara Zagora's youth teams.

== Career statistics ==
| Club | Season | League | | Cup | | Europe | | Total | |
| Club | Season | Apps | Goals | Apps | Goals | Apps | Goals | Apps | Goals |
|---|---|---|---|---|---|---|---|---|---|
| Beroe Stara Zagora | 2001-02 | 5 | 1 | 0 | 0 | 0 | 0 | 5 | 1 |
| Beroe Stara Zagora | 2002-03 | 14 | 1 | 0 | 0 | 0 | 0 | 14 | 1 |
| Beroe Stara Zagora | 2003-04 | 11 | 1 | 0 | 0 | 0 | 0 | 11 | 1 |
| Beroe Stara Zagora | 2004-05 | 21 | 0 | 1 | 0 | 0 | 0 | 22 | 0 |
| Beroe Stara Zagora | 2005-06 | 24 | 7 | 1 | 0 | 0 | 0 | 25 | 7 |
| Beroe Stara Zagora | 2006-07 | 24 | 2 | 4 | 1 | 0 | 0 | 28 | 3 |
| Beroe Stara Zagora | 2007-08 | 14 | 4 | 1 | 0 | 0 | 0 | 15 | 4 |
| PFC Lokomotiv Sofia | 2007-08 | 10 | 1 | 1 | 0 | 0 | 0 | 11 | 1 |
| PFC Lokomotiv Sofia | 2008-09 | 26 | 3 | 1 | 0 | 2 | 0 | 29 | 3 |
| PFC Lokomotiv Sofia | 2009-10 | 20 | 2 | 1 | 0 | 0 | 0 | 21 | 2 |
| Bnei Sakhnin F.C. | 2010-11 | 7 | 0 | 0 | 0 | 0 | 0 | 7 | 0 |
| Sliema Wanderers F.C. | 2011-12 | 25 | 10 | 2 | 4 | 0 | 0 | 27 | 14 |
| Mosta F.C | 2012-13 | 29 | 12 | 0 | 0 | 0 | 0 | 29 | 12 |
| Career totals | | 230 | 44 | 12 | 5 | 2 | 0 | 244 | 49 |
