= Berovo =

Berovo Берово (Macedonian)
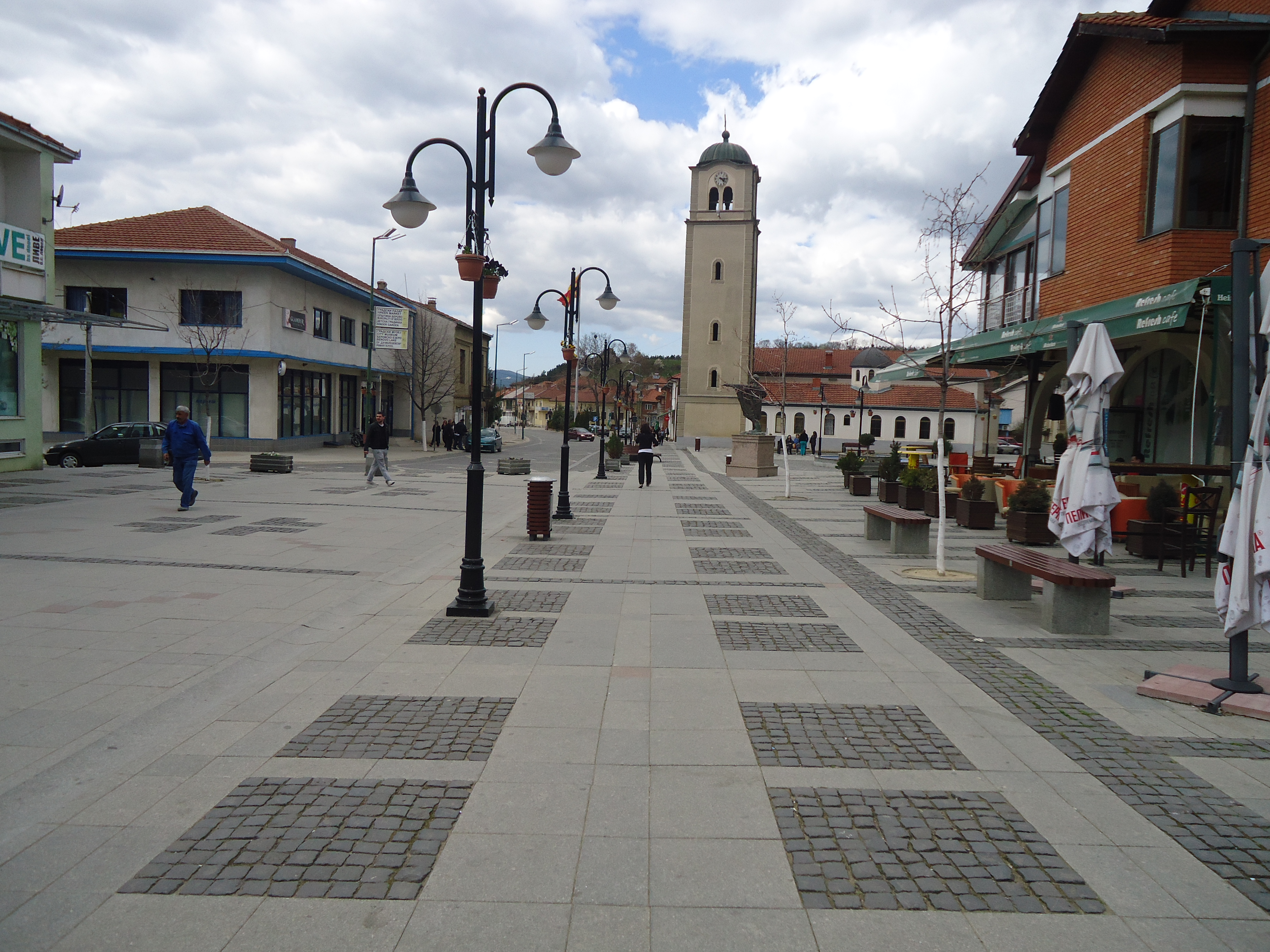

- Flag Seal

- Location within North Macedonia
- Coordinates: 41°42′36″N 22°51′0″E
- Country: North Macedonia
- Region: Eastern
- Municipality: Berovo

Government
  - Mayor: Dzvonko Pekevski (SDSM)
- Elevation: 986 m (3,235 ft)

Population (2002)
  - Total: 8,000
- Time zone: UTC+1 (CET)
  - Summer (DST): UTC+2 (CEST)
- Postal code: 2330
- Area code: +389 033
- Vehicle registration: BE
- Climate: Cfb
- Website: www.berovo.gov.mk/

Berovo (Macedonian: Берово, pronounced [ˈbɛrɔvɔ]) is a small town near the Maleševo Mountains, 161 km (100 mi) from Skopje, 47 km (29 mi) from Strumica and 52 km (32 mi) from Kočani, in North Macedonia. It is the seat of Berovo Municipality.

== Demographics ==
According to the 2002 census, the town had a total of 7,002 inhabitants. Ethnic groups in the town include:

	Number	%
TOTAL	7,002	100
Macedonians	6,404	91.45
Roma	459	6.55
Other	139	1.98

== History ==
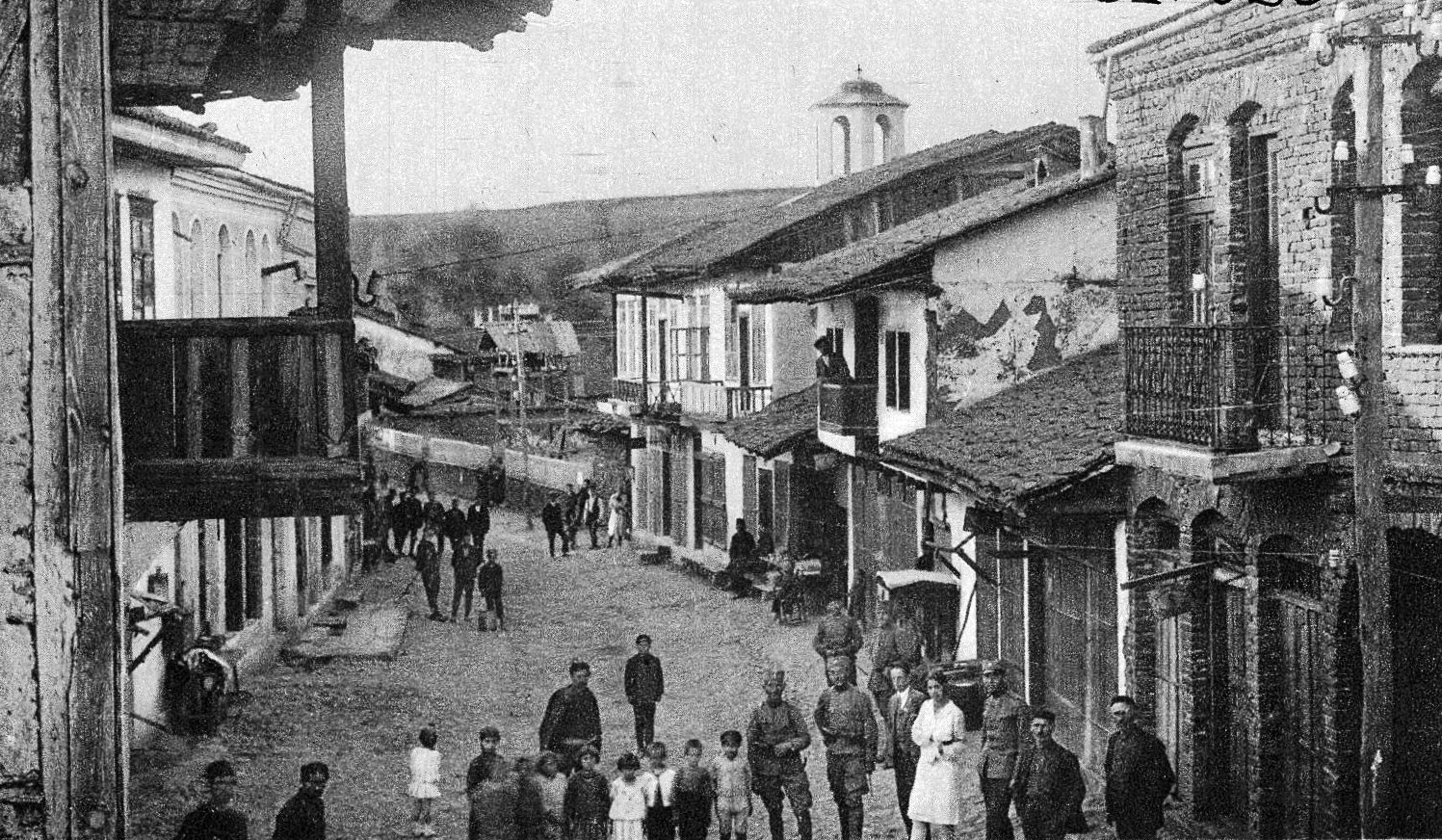
Berovo, 1920s

In the late 19th and early 20th century, Berovo was part of the Kosovo Vilayet of the Ottoman Empire. According to the statistics of Bulgarian ethnographer Vasil Kanchov from 1900, 2,940 inhabitants lived in Berovo, 2,300 Bulgarian Christians, 600 Bulgarian Muslims and 40 Romani. As a result of the Balkan Wars, the town was included in the area ceded in 1913 to the Kingdom of Serbia, which in 1918 joined the Kingdom of Serbs, Croats and Slovenes (renamed Kingdom of Yugoslavia in 1929). From 1929 to 1941, Berovo was part of the Vardar Banovina of the Kingdom of Yugoslavia. From 1941 to 1944, during the Axis occupation of Yugoslavia, Berovo, as most of Vardar Macedonia, was annexed by the Kingdom of Bulgaria.

== Climate ==
Berovo, which is part of the Maleshevo Valley, has a humid continental climate with climate modification in the high mountainous and lowland parts. The city has significantly lower average annual air temperature than the areas at the same altitude in the wider part of the valley. At an altitude of 800 m, the average annual temperature is 11.1 °C, and in Berovo 8.7 °C. The coldest month is January with an average temperature of −10 °C, and the warmest month is July, with an average temperature of +18 °C. The average annual minimum temperature is 2.8 °C, and the average maximum temperature is 15.3 °C. The most precipitation is in May and June, as well as in November, and the driest months are August and September.

The average annual rainfall is 672 mm / m3. The main maximum falls in May, on average around 76.8 mm / m3, and the secondary in November -64.3 mm / m3. The main minimum is in August, with an average of 37.6 mm / m3, and the secondary in February. The number of rainy days per year is 118. In the average annual amount of precipitation, the snow occupies about 15% and occurs from October to May. On average, there are 42.2 days of snow per year.

The relative humidity decreases from January to August, then increases from December, and the average humidity is 76%. The average annual duration of solar radiation is 2.347 hours or 6.4 hours per day, with a maximum in July of 10.2 hours per day, and a minimum in December of 3 hours per day. In the Berovo Valley fog is rare, only about 8.4 foggy days on average. The appearance of hail is rare, on average 2.9 days occur with hail. Frostbite is less frequent and occurs 70 days a year, from September to May. Winds from all 8 world directions appear in the Berovo Valley, but the northern one prevails, with a frequency of 147% and a speed of 2.4 m / sec., which is most present in January, February and March.

== Culture ==
Berovo Municipality is home to three sites designated as Cultural Heritage by the Ministry of Culture, all of which are within the town of Berovo. This includes the home at no. 11 Kočo Racin street, the home at no. 127 Maršal Tito street, and the Monastery of Saint Michael the Archangel.

=== Monastery of the Holy Archangel Michael ===
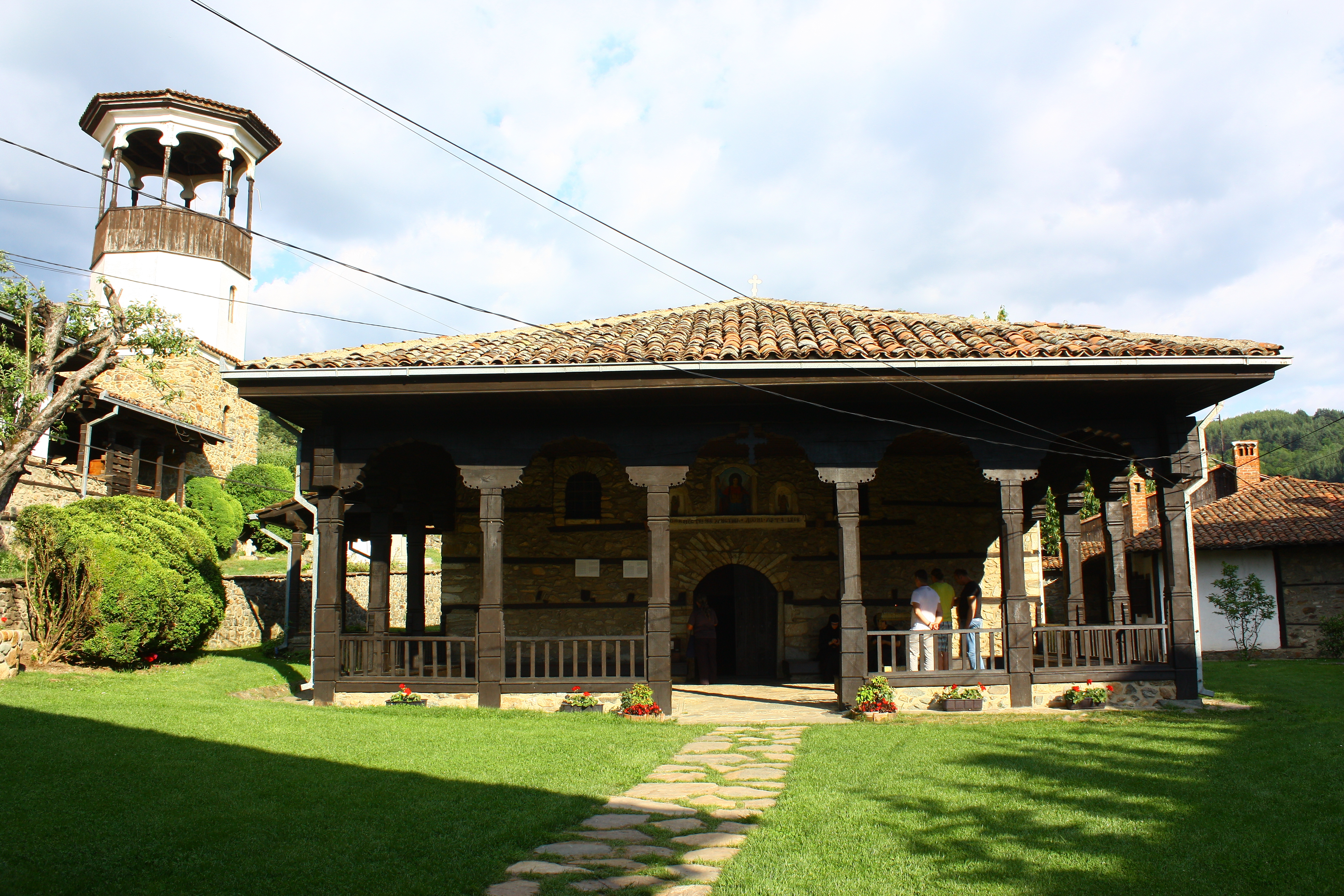
Monastery of the Holy Archangel Michael

The first monastery in Berovo was built between 1815 until it was consecrated in 1818. Enlightener Joachim Krcovski was among those present at the consecration. Historical data concerning the construction of the church and the monastery is inconclusive, but it is known that circumstances were very difficult.

In the early 19th century Berovo was a rural settlement with around two hundred houses and one small church that had fallen into decay. The inhabitants at the time decided to have a new church built at the site known as Mogila. The parish priest, Friar Peco, was assigned to obtain a building permit from the Turkish authorities in Radoviš. The Turkish governor Vali gave a building permit but made sure to set conditions for construction of the church as difficult as possible. The church was to be built low, below the road level and not to be seen, construction was to end in forty days, and Fr Peco was to give his youngest daughter, Sultana, to the harem. The people of the town prevailed and the church building was finished and covered with stone blocks, soot, and lime (so as not to be noticed) in 40 days. Seeing that the church had been completed, Vali immediately ordered the deaths of three church elders in front of the church, and since Sultana had fled to Kyustendil, Friar Peco was imprisoned for three years. When Sultana found out that Vali had been murdered by komitas, she promptly returned to Berovo.

=== Convent ===
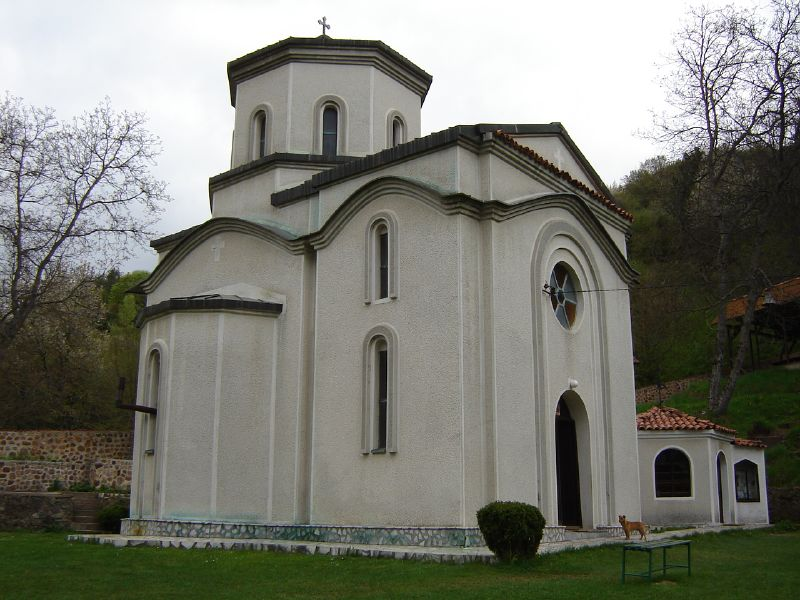
Monastery in Berovo

The first convent, located at the exit from Berovo leading to the dam and the lake, was built in 1940 in a 19th-century architectural opus, twenty years after the construction of the Monastery of the Holy Archangel Michael, and the first nuns were the daughter-in-law and the daughter of Friar Risto, a son-in-law of Friar Peco. They had their monastic tonsure (removal of the hair of the head) with a blessing from the Rila Monastery's abbott. Eugenia I was the first abbess of the convent, the second – Eugenia II, the third – Eugenia III, and the fourth abbess was Eulampia in 1958 by the first Archbishop of Ohrid, Dositheus. At its peak, in the first half of the twentieth century, the convent numbered up to sixty nuns, with a rich and developed economy, a theological seminary, a weaving mill, and the first single-phase hydro-power plant in this area was in the convent.

The three gates of the church face the town, the river and the pine forest. A large porch dominates the convent yard and in the dimness of its interior oil lamps lighten images of saints, painted in a characteristic style that is antonymic to Byzantine canons. Only one icon, that of Noah, painted by George Veljanov from Strumica in 1818. From 1897 to 1920 the painter Gavril Atanasov also worked in the convent. The icon of the Dormition of the Theotokos was painted by Gregory Pecanov from Strumica in 1878. The residential quarters are of a free-style construction. They attract with the warmth of the wood used, shaped in a 19th-century old-urban style.

Four sisters who came from the Veljusa monastery live together with the last nun of the previous lineage. The sisterhood of the convent is active in Byzantine style icon painting. The beginnings of the renewal of fresco painting in Macedonian monasteries was started by the sisterhood.

The Hesychastic (14th century Greek sect of Christianity) monastery typikon functions as a place of prayer, a holy hesychasterion. The upper floor of the church was recently turned into a small chapel dedicated to St. Gregory Palamas.

=== Local Politics ===
As of the municipal elections 2017, the new mayor of Berovo is Zvonko Pekevski.

== Sports ==
Local football club FK Maleš play in the Macedonian Third League (Southeast Division).

== Twin cities ==
- Brus, Serbia

== People from Berovo ==
Stealing the cursed maize
Excerpt from speech by a man from Berovo in the native Maleševo-Pirin dialect
