= Petar Kyumurdzhiev =

Bulgarian footballer

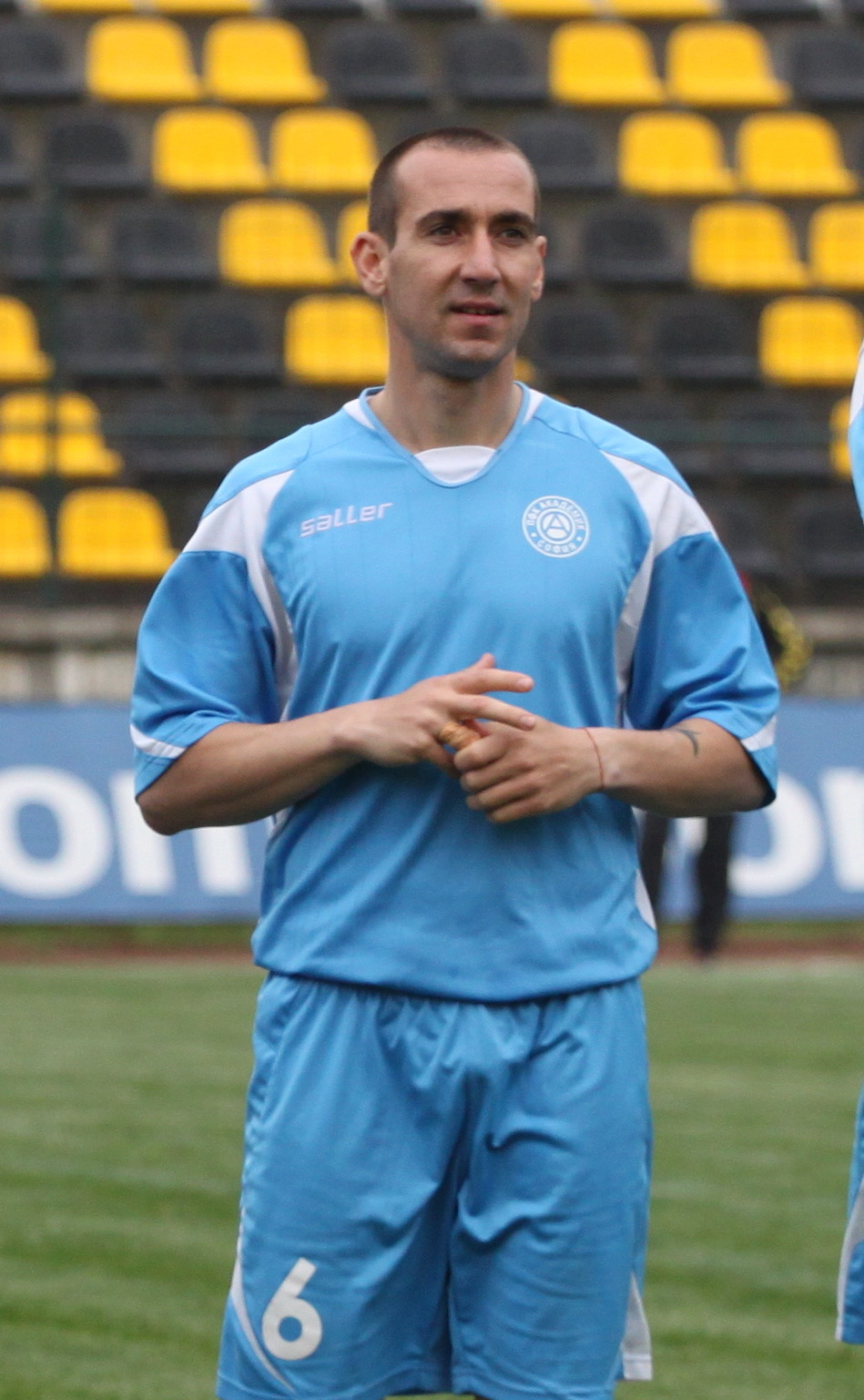

Personal information
- Full name: Petar Kirilov Kyumyurdzhiev
- Date of birth: 15 December 1981 (age 44)
- Place of birth: Burgas, Bulgaria
- Height: 1.76 m (5 ft 9 in)
- Positions: Left-back; defensive midfielder

Senior career*
Years	Team	Apps	(Gls)
1998–2004	Chernomorets Burgas	81	(0)
2004–2007	Slavia Sofia	57	(1)
2008–2010	Lokomotiv Plovdiv	59	(0)
2010–2011	Akademik Sofia	25	(0)
2011	Sozopol	12	(0)
2012	Bdin Vidin	11	(0)
2012–2017	Kerċem Ajax	137	(11)
2018–2022	Sozopol	71	(0)
Total		453	(12)
- * Club domestic league appearances and goals

Petar Kyumurdzhiev (Bulgarian: Петър Кюмюрджиев; born 15 December 1981 in Burgas) is a Bulgarian retired footballer who played as a defender.
