= Keya Creek =

Creek in Taiwan

Keya Creek 隙仔溪 (Xìzǐ Creek)
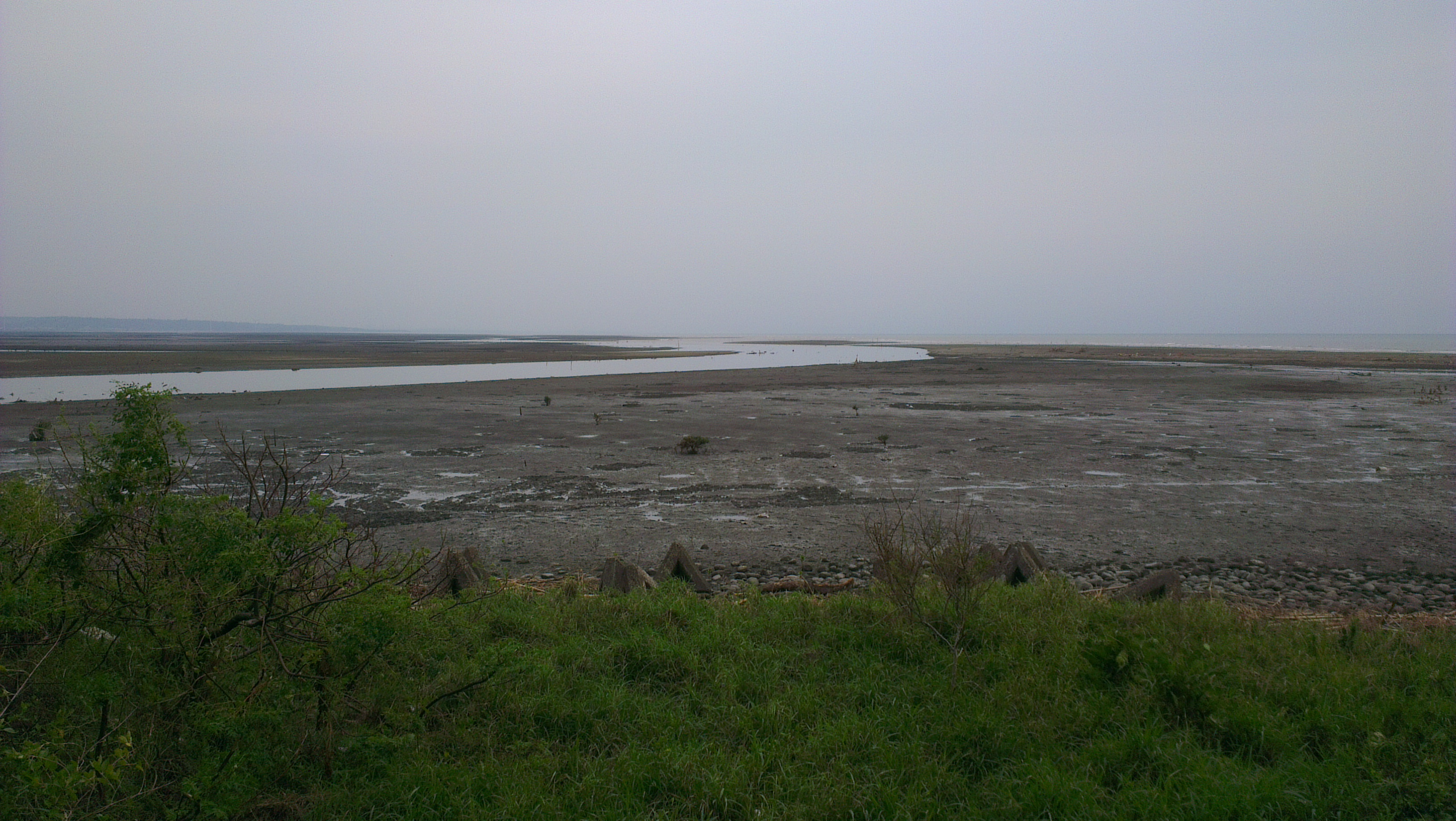
- Ke-Yar stream
- Native name: 客雅溪 (Chinese)

Location
- Country: Taiwan

Physical characteristics
- Source: Běikēng Bridge
  - location: Zhudong Hills
  - coordinates: 24.716100°N 121.136862°E
  - elevation: 285 metres (935 ft)
- Mouth
  - location: Taiwan Strait
  - coordinates: 24.804573°N 120.901402°E
  - elevation: 0 metres (0 ft)
- Length: 26.6 km (16.5 mi)
- Basin size: 25.6 km^{2} (9.9 sq mi)
- Discharge
  - average: 78.3 cubic metres per second (2,770 cu ft/s)

Keya Creek (Chinese: 客雅溪; pinyin: Kèyǎ Xī) is a creek in northern Taiwan. Keya Creek is under the jurisdiction of the Central Management District. It was originally known as Xizhi Creek. The Creek covers Hsinchu County, Baoshan Township and Hsinchu City. Keya Creek starts from Zhudong Hills, then flowing down to the four townships of Shanhu, Baoshan, Daqi, and Shuangxi, then enters into Hsinchu City's Green Grass Lake, Hsinchu plains, then out into Taiwan Strait.

== History ==
Historically, Hsinchu's rice noodles were produced along Keya Creek, the noodle makers would set out basket for them to dry along the creek.
