= Orlin Orlinov =

Bulgarian footballer

Personal information
- Full name: Orlin Marinov Orlinov
- Date of birth: 8 August 1988 (age 38)
- Place of birth: Teteven, Bulgaria
- Height: 1.82 m (6 ft 0 in)
- Positions: Winger; forward

Senior career*
Years	Team	Apps	(Gls)
2005	Botev Debelets	?	(?)
2005–2006	Litex Lovech	1	(0)
2006–2009	Slavia Sofia	30	(3)
2009	→ Spartak Varna (loan)	10	(1)
2009–2010	CSKA Sofia	3	(0)
2011	Zagorets Nova Zagora	12	(4)
2011	Chavdar Byala Slatina	11	(0)
2012–2013	Didim Belediyespor	?	(?)
2013	Lyubimets 2007	8	(1)
2014	Spartak Varna	2	(0)
2017	Vihar Slavyanovo	4	(0)
2018	Pirin Gotse Delchev	14	(3)
2018	Septemvri Simitli	?	(?)

International career
	Bulgaria U19	14	(1)
- * Club domestic league appearances and goals as of 1 August 2018

Orlin Marinov Orlinov (Bulgarian: Орлин Орлинов; born 8 August 1988 in Teteven) is a Bulgarian football winger who plays for Septemvri Simitli.

== Career ==
Orlinov started his professional career at Litex Lovech, for which he made his debut in the A PFG during season 2005/06 at the age of 17. In June 2006, he joined Slavia Sofia. He was loaned to Spartak Varna in the opening days of the 2009 January transfer market. To the end of the season Orlinov played 10 matches for Spartak and scored one goal against his previously club Slavia Sofia.

On 3 July 2009, Orlinov signed a one-year contract with the option for extension for another two with CSKA Sofia. His time with CSKA has been marred by some disciplinary issues. In March 2010 he was arrested for kidnapping model, reality TV star and television reporter Katrin Vacheva and assaulting her for several hours. She was left with a broken nose, concussion and brain injuries. She said to police that, "He dragged me for a few metres, there was a trail of blood. He said – you are a beautiful woman, and all beautiful women deserve to be beaten."

In July 2012, Orlinov joined Turkish amateur side Didim Belediyespor.
