= Aleksandar Branekov =

Bulgarian footballer (born 1987)

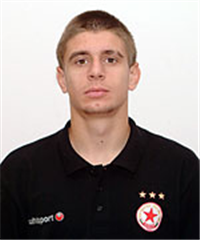

Personal information
- Full name: Aleksandar Georgiev Branekov
- Date of birth: 31 May 1987 (age 39)
- Place of birth: Sofia, Bulgaria
- Height: 1.92 m (6 ft 4 in)
- Position: Centre back

Team information
- Current team: FA Levski-Spartak 1962 (youth coach)

Senior career*
Years	Team	Apps	(Gls)
2005–2010	CSKA Sofia	28	(2)
2007–2008	→ Lokomotiv Plovdiv (loan)	7	(1)
2010–2011	Vidima-Rakovski	41	(4)
2012–2015	Lokomotiv Sofia	92	(3)
2015–2016	CSKA Sofia	10	(1)
2016–2017	Slavia Sofia	9	(1)
2017	Septemvri Sofia	4	(0)
2017–2018	Lokomotiv Sofia	17	(0)
Total		208	(12)

Managerial career
- 2020–: FA Levski-Spartak 1962 (youth coach)
- * Club domestic league appearances and goals

Aleksandar Georgiev Branekov (Bulgarian: Александър Георгиев Бранеков; born 31 May 1987) is a former Bulgarian professional footballer who played as a centre back.

== Career ==
Branekov is a product of the CSKA Sofia Academy. He marked his first-team debut with goal, opening the scoring in a 2–1 away win over Lokomotiv Sofia on 6 November 2005. Branekov spent a 2007–08 season on loan with Lokomotiv Plovdiv to build up his first team experience, but earned only 7 appearances in the A Group.

In June 2008, Branekov returned to CSKA. After the game with Lokomotiv Sofia on 5 May 2010, in which Branekov scored goal for the 5–1 home win, he came into conflict with the fans and was removed from the first team. In June 2010, he was released from CSKA.

A month later, Branekov signed a contract as a free agent with Vidima-Rakovski Sevlievo and quickly established himself as a key player. During his time with Vidima, he scored 4 goals in 41 matches in the A Group.

On 1 February 2012, Branekov signed a one-and-a-half-year contract with Lokomotiv Sofia. He made his debut in a 2–0 home win over Lokomotiv Plovdiv on 5 March. In January 2013, Branekov was announced as Lokomotiv's new club captain. On 10 June 2013, he signed a two-year contract extension, keeping him at Lokomotiv until 30 June 2015. On 22 February 2014, he scored his first goal in a Lokomotiv shirt against Neftochimic Burgas, in a 5–1 home league win. On 13 March, Branekov scored the only goal in a home win over Chernomorets Burgas in the Bulgarian Cup.

On 1 July 2015, Branekov returned to his favorite club CSKA Sofia despite the fact that the team would play amateur football the following season. He had an opportunity to join the rival club Levski Sofia but he rejected the offer from them.

On 14 June 2017, Branekov joined Septemvri Sofia. He made his debut for the team on 17 July 2017 in a match against Dunav Ruse. On 31 August 2017, his contract was terminated by mutual consent.

On 4 September 2017, Branekov signed with Second League club Lokomotiv Sofia. At the end of the 2017–18 season, he announced his retirement from football. Branekov subsequently became a youth coach in Emil Velev's academy - FA Levski-Spartak 1962 in Sofia.

== Personal ==
On 2 September 2020, Branekov was arrested for being involved in a riot (throwing paving stones at police officers) during the protests against the Borisov government. He was released by the Sofia District Court after 72 hours. In November 2023, Branekov received a two-year suspended sentence.

== Career statistics ==
As of 22 December 2015

Club	Season	Division	League		Cup		Europe		Total	
Club	Season	Division	Apps	Goals	Apps	Goals	Apps	Goals	Apps	Goals
CSKA Sofia	2005–06	A Group	13	1	0	0	0	0	13	1
CSKA Sofia	2006–07	A Group	2	0	0	0	0	0	2	0
CSKA Sofia	2008–09	A Group	6	0	0	0	0	0	6	0
CSKA Sofia	2009–10	A Group	7	1	1	0	2	0	10	1
CSKA Sofia	Total		28	2	1	0	2	0	31	2
Lokomotiv Plovdiv (loan)	2007–08	A Group	7	0	2	0	–		9	0
Lokomotiv Plovdiv (loan)	Total		7	0	2	0	–		9	0
Vidima-Rakovski	2010–11	A Group	27	2	0	0	–		27	2
Vidima-Rakovski	2011–12	A Group	14	2	0	0	–		14	2
Vidima-Rakovski	Total		41	4	0	0	–		41	4
Lokomotiv Sofia	2011–12	A Group	13	0	0	0	–		13	0
Lokomotiv Sofia	2012–13	A Group	27	0	7	0	–		34	0
Lokomotiv Sofia	2013–14	A Group	26	2	7	1	–		33	3
Lokomotiv Sofia	2014–15	A Group	26	1	2	0	–		28	1
Lokomotiv Sofia	Total		92	3	16	1	–		108	4
CSKA Sofia	2015–16	V Group	10	1	3	0	–		13	1
CSKA Sofia	Total		10	1	3	0	–		13	1
Career total			178	10	22	1	2	0	202	11

== Honours ==
CSKA Sofia

- Bulgarian Cup (1): 2006
- Bulgarian Supercup (1): 2008
