= Kosta Yanev =

Bulgarian footballer

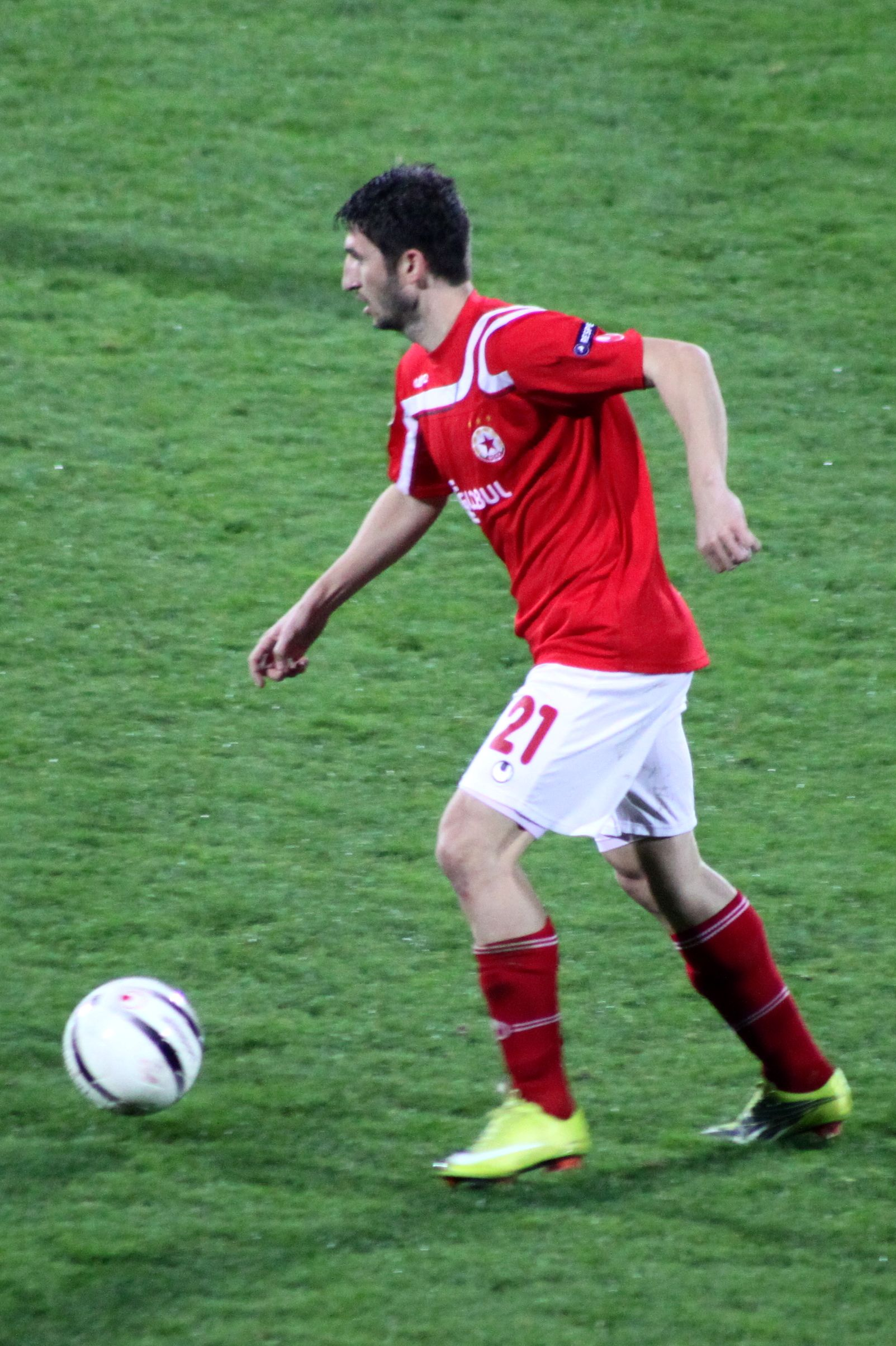

Personal information
- Full name: Kosta Georgiev Yanev
- Date of birth: 21 July 1983 (age 43)
- Place of birth: Burgas, PR Bulgaria
- Height: 1.75 m (5 ft 9 in)
- Position: Defensive midfielder

Team information
- Current team: FC Sliven
- Number: 21

Senior career*
Years	Team	Apps	(Gls)
2003–2004	Pomorie	8	(0)
2004–2006	Naftex Burgas	19	(0)
2006–2007	Chernomorets Burgas	21	(2)
2008–2009	Sliven	36	(0)
2009–2011	CSKA Sofia	32	(1)
2011	Lokomotiv Sofia	15	(0)
2012	CSKA Sofia	6	(0)
2013	Cherno More	0	(0)
2013–2014	Neftochimic 1986	26	(0)
2014	Spartak Varna	0	(0)
2014–2022	Zagorets	?	(?)
2022–	FC Sliven	10	(0)

International career^{‡}
2008–2009	Bulgaria	3	(0)
- * Club domestic league appearances and goals as of 10:14, 10 October 2022 (UTC) ‡ National team caps and goals as of 11 February 2012

Kosta Yanev (Bulgarian: Коста Янев; born 21 July 1983) is a Bulgarian footballer who currently plays as a midfielder for FC Sliven.

He is a defensive midfielder who plays in the holding midfield role or as an attacking midfielder. Despite often being used in a defensive position he is mainly an attacking player. He has been capped for the Bulgarian national team.

== Career ==
Born in Burgas, Yanev started to play football in local club Naftex. In 2004, he was loaned to Pomorie. In 2005, Yanev returned to Naftex Burgas. After that the midfielder played for the other club from Burgas –– Chernomorets.

In January 2008, Yanev signed with OFC Sliven 2000 and five months later joined the club champion of Bulgarian second division. Next season in the top division Kosta left excellent impressions in the football specialists with his good play. In November 2008, the national coach Plamen Markov called Yanev in Bulgaria national football team for a friendly match with Serbia.

On 24 June 2009, Yanev signed a contract for 3 years with CSKA Sofia. On 15 August 2009, he scored his first goal for the "armymen" in the 3–0 home win against Beroe Stara Zagora in a league match.
