= Kostadin Stoyanov =

Bulgarian footballer

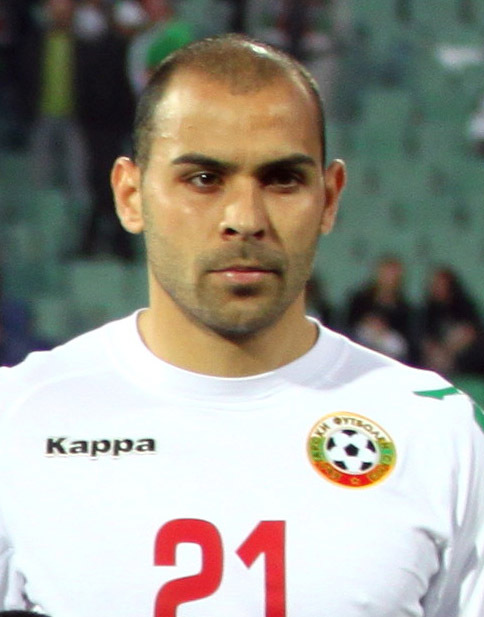
- Stoyanov with Bulgaria in 2011

Personal information
- Full name: Kostadin Stoyanov Stoyanov
- Date of birth: 2 May 1986 (age 40)
- Place of birth: Sliven, Bulgaria
- Height: 1.80 m (5 ft 11 in)
- Positions: Centre-back; left-back

Youth career
- Sliven
- Chernomorets Burgas

Senior career*
Years	Team	Apps	(Gls)
2004–2005	Chernomorets Burgas	5	(0)
2005–2007	Zagorets	54	(6)
2007–2009	Sliven 2000	48	(2)
2009–2013	CSKA Sofia	61	(2)
2013	Beroe Stara Zagora	3	(0)
2015–2016	Vereya II	?	(?)
2016	Botev Plovdiv	3	(0)
2016–2017	Vereya II	24	(6)
2017	Sozopol	11	(0)
Total		209	(16)

International career
2007	South-East Bulgaria	4	(0)
2009–2011	Bulgaria	7	(0)
- * Club domestic league appearances and goals as of 22:20, 5 December 2017 (UTC)

Kostadin Stoyanov (Bulgarian: Костадин Стоянов; born 2 May 1986) is a Bulgarian former professional footballer who played as defender.

== Career ==
Stoyanov began his football career playing for Sliven, before joined Chernomorets Burgas. Stoyanov made his B PFG debut on 21 August 2004, in Chernomorets's 1–0 defeat to Vihren Sandanski. In the summer of 2005 he joined Zagorets Nova Zagora.

In June 2007 he moved to OFC Sliven 2000. After a two good seasons in Sliven, on 24 June 2009, he signed a contract for 3 years with CSKA Sofia. He scored his first goal for the team on 20 September 2009 in the 2:0 win against Levski Sofia in The Eternal Derby of Bulgaria.

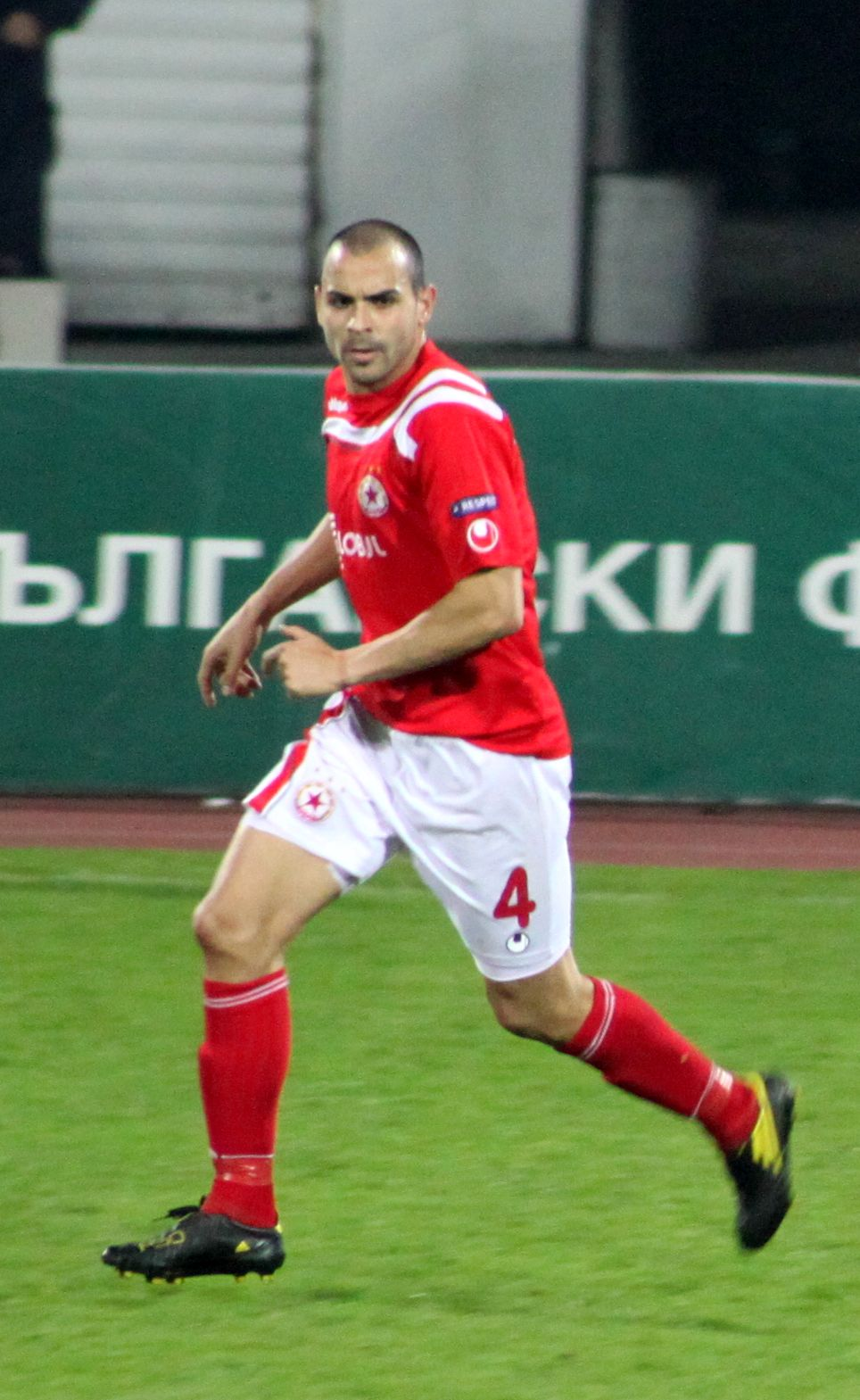
Stoyanov playing for CSKA in 2011

He retired from football in 2013 due to serious injury.

Two years later and after a special intervention, he came back from retirement with Vereya, but played with the second team most of the time. On 5 June 2016 Stoyanov scored 2 goals for Vereya II in the playoffs for V Group won by Vereya with 2–1.

In the summer of 2016 he returned in the professional football by signing with Botev Plovdiv. But was released after just 3 games and he returned to play for his local amateur Vereya II.

On 25 June 2017 he signed with Sozopol. After 11 matches with the team, he retired once again in the end of the year.

== International career ==
In June 2007 he participated with the team in the European Football Championship for amateurs - UEFA Regions' Cup in Bulgaria. On 26 June 2007 Stoyanov played in the final of the tournament, but Bulgaria lost the match against Poland with 1:2. On 2 October 2009 Stoyanov was called by the manager of the Bulgaria national football team Stanimir Stoilov for the matches against Cyprus and Georgia.
