= Jonathan Gómez (Paraguayan footballer) =

Paraguayan footballer (born 1985)

Personal information
- Full name: Jonathan Samuel Gomez Newmann
- Date of birth: 28 July 1985 (age 41)
- Place of birth: Asunción, Paraguay
- Height: 1.80 m (5 ft 11 in)
- Position: Midfielder

Youth career
- Cerro Porteño

Senior career*
Years	Team	Apps	(Gls)
2004–2006	Cerro Porteño		
2006–2007	Venezia		
2007–2009	Sportivo Trinidense		
- * Club domestic league appearances and goals as of 26 July 2009

Jonathan Samuel Gomez Newmann (born 28 July 1985, Asunción, Paraguay) is a Paraguayan football midfielder.

== Career ==
Gómez began his top-flight club career at Cerro Porteño. He later moved to Italy, where he played for Venezia. He then returned to Paraguay and was part of Sportivo Trinidense.
