= Atanas Atanasov (footballer, born 1985) =

Bulgarian footballer

Personal information
- Full name: Atanas Marinov Atanasov
- Date of birth: 14 July 1985 (age 41)
- Place of birth: Pleven, Bulgaria
- Height: 1.78 m (5 ft 10 in)
- Position: Left back

Youth career
- Spartak Pleven

Senior career*
Years	Team	Apps	(Gls)
2003–2006	Chernomorets Burgas	69	(2)
2006	Vidima-Rakovski	3	(0)
2007	Belite orli	19	(0)
2008	Spartak Pleven	16	(0)
2008–2010	Beroe Stara Zagora	41	(1)
2010–2011	Lokomotiv Sofia	24	(0)
2012	Spartak Pleven	?	(?)
2012	Etar 1924	11	(0)
2013	Lokomotiv Plovdiv	7	(0)
2013–2014	Spartak Pleven	26	(1)
2014–2017	Dunav Ruse	68	(3)
- * Club domestic league appearances and goals as of 6 June 2017

Atanas Atanasov (Bulgarian: Атанас Атанасов; born 14 July 1985 in Pleven) is a Bulgarian footballer who plays as a defender. His role on the pitch is left wingback.

== Career ==
Atanasov started to play football at Spartak Pleven, but at the age of 18 moved to Chernomorets Burgas and during season 2003-04 made his debut in the A PFG. After that he played also in Vidima-Rakovski Sevlievo and Belite orli. In January 2008 Atanasov returned to his first club Spartak Pleven. Some six months later signed a contract with Beroe Stara Zagora and during season 2008–09 with the club he became champion of the second division. Atanasov was part of the Dunav Ruse squad that earned consecutive promotions to First League and finished 4th in the top flight at the end of the 2016–17 campaign. He left the club in June 2017.

== Statistics ==
Club	Season	Appearances	Goals
Beroe	2008-09	24	1
Beroe	Total	24	1
Spartak Pleven	2007-08	16	0
Spartak Pleven	Total	16	0
Belite orli	2007-08	6	0
Belite orli	2006-07	13	0
Belite orli	Total	19	0
Vidima-Rakovski	2006-07	3	0
Vidima-Rakovski	Total	3	0
Chernomorets	2005-06	26	1
Chernomorets	2004-05	29	1
Chernomorets	2003-04	14	0
Chernomorets	Total	69	2
Career Totals		131	3

== Honours ==
=== Club ===
- Beroe
  - Bulgarian Cup:
    - Winner: 2009-10
