= 2008–09 PFC CSKA Sofia season =

CSKA Sofia
2008–09 season
- Chairman: Dimitar Borisov
- Manager: Lyuboslav Penev
- A Group: Second place
- Supercup: Winner
- Bulgarian Cup: Quarterfinals
- Top goalscorer: League: Yordan Todorov (9); All: Dormushali Saidhodzha (14)
Home colours	Away colours

The 2008–09 season was PFC CSKA Sofia's 61st consecutive season in A Group. This article shows player statistics and all matches (official and friendly) that the club have and will play during the 2008–09 season.

== Players ==
=== Squad information ===
Appearances for competitive matches only

No.	Pos	Nat	Player	Total		A Group		Bulgarian Cup		Supercup	
No.	Pos	Nat	Player	Apps	Goals	Apps	Goals	Apps	Goals	Apps	Goals
1	GK	(Bulgaria) BUL	Ventsislav Velinov	1	0	0	0	1	0	0	0
2	DF	(Bulgaria) BUL	Pavel Kovachev	1	0	1	0	0	0	0	0
3	DF	(Bulgaria) BUL	Pavel Vidanov	17	0	15	0	2	0	0	0
4	DF	(Bulgaria) BUL	Kristian Uzunov	1	0	1	0	0	0	0	0
5	MF	(Bulgaria) BUL	Todor Yanchev	30	4	26	3	3	1	1	0
6	DF	(Bulgaria) BUL	Kiril Kotev	30	5	27	3	2	1	1	1
7	FW	(Bulgaria) BUL	Vladimir Manchev	4	4	4	4	0	0	0	0
8	FW	(Bulgaria) BUL	Martin Toshev	17	2	13	0	3	2	1	0
9	FW	(Bulgaria) BUL	Vladislav Zlatinov	7	1	6	1	0	0	1	0
10	MF	(Bulgaria) BUL	Nikolay Chipev	21	0	20	0	0	0	1	0
11	FW	(Bulgaria) BUL	Zdravko Lazarov	15	2	15	2	0	0	0	0
12	GK	(Bulgaria) BUL	Ivan Karadzhov	1	0	1	0	0	0	0	0
13	DF	(Bulgaria) BUL	Aleksandar Branekov	7	0	6	0	1	0	0	0
14	MF	(Bulgaria) BUL	Atanas Zehirov	5	1	5	1	0	0	0	0
15	DF	(Bulgaria) BUL	Ivan Ivanov	34	5	30	5	3	0	1	0
16	MF	(Bulgaria) BUL	Dzihat Kyamil	1	0	1	0	0	0	0	0
17	FW	(Portugal) POR	Rui Miguel	15	4	14	4	1	0	0	0
18	DF	(Bulgaria) BUL	Aleksandar Sabev	2	0	1	0	1	0	0	0
19	FW	(Bulgaria) BUL	Evgeni Yordanov	14	2	13	2	0	0	1	0
21	MF	(Nigeria) NGR	Shikoze Udoji	19	3	17	3	1	0	1	0
22	DF	(Brazil) BRA	Eli Marques	14	1	14	1	0	0	0	0
24	MF	(Bulgaria) BUL	Aleksandar Tonev	18	2	16	2	1	0	1	0
25	GK	(Cameroon) CMR	Daniel Bekono	18	0	15	0	2	0	1	0
27	GK	(Bulgaria) BUL	Ivaylo Petrov	15	0	14	0	1	0	0	0
28	MF	(Brazil) BRA	Marquinhos	28	5	25	2	3	3	0	0
30	MF	(Bulgaria) BUL	Yordan Todorov	30	9	26	9	3	0	1	0
32	MF	(Latvia) LAT	Viktors Morozs	15	2	12	2	3	0	0	0
33	MF	(Portugal) POR	David Silva	12	1	11	1	1	0	0	0
34	FW	(Iceland) ISL	Garðar Gunnlaugsson	7	1	5	0	2	1	0	0
52	DF	(Bulgaria) BUL	Yordan Minev	12	0	11	0	1	0	0	0
84	DF	(Brazil) BRA	Filipe Machado	27	0	23	0	3	0	1	0
99	FW	(Bulgaria) BUL	Dormushali Saidhodzha	14	7	13	7	1	0	0	0
Players sold or loaned out after the start of the season:
2	DF	(Serbia) SRB	Nenad Nastić	0	0	0	0	0	0	0	0
17	MF	(Portugal) POR	Zé Rui	8	1	8	1	0	0	0	0
20	DF	(Slovenia) SLO	Mitja Mörec	3	0	2	0	1	0	0	0
26	MF	(Bulgaria) BUL	Yanko Sandanski	1	0	1	0	0	0	0	0
27	DF	(Netherlands) NED	Quido Lanzaat	0	0	0	0	0	0	0	0
29	DF	(Bulgaria) BUL	Dimitar Petkov	0	0	0	0	0	0	0	0
88	MF	(Portugal) POR	Filipe da Costa	6	0	5	0	1	0	0	0
99	FW	(Brazil) BRA	Nei	1	0	0	0	0	0	1	0

As of game played start of season

== Players in/out ==
=== Summer transfers ===
In: Note: Flags indicate national team as defined under FIFA eligibility rules; some limited exceptions apply. Players may hold more than one non-FIFA nationality.

No.	Pos.	Nation	Player
1	GK	BUL	Ventsislav Velinov (from Apollon Limassol)
3	DF	BUL	Pavel Vidanov (loan return from Vihren)
4	DF	BUL	Kristian Uzunov (from CSKA Sofia II)
7	FW	BUL	Vladimir Manchev (from Real Valladolid)
8	FW	BUL	Martin Toshev (from 1. FC Köln)
9	FW	BUL	Vladislav Zlatinov (from Beroe)
10	MF	BUL	Nikolay Chipev (from CSKA Sofia II)
11	FW	BUL	Zdravko Lazarov (free agent)
13	DF	BUL	Aleksandar Branekov (loan return from Lokomotiv Plovdiv)
15	DF	BUL	Ivan Ivanov (loan return from Lokomotiv Plovdiv)
16	MF	BUL	Dzhihat Kyamil (from CSKA Sofia II)
18	DF	BUL	Aleksandar Sabev (loan return from Rilski sportist)
20	DF	SLO	Mitja Mörec (from Maccabi Herzliya)
22	DF	BRA	Eli Marques (from Belasitsa Petrich)
29	DF	BUL	Dimitar Petkov (from Slavia Sofia)
32	MF	LAT	Viktors Morozs (from Skonto Riga)
34	FW	ISL	Garðar Gunnlaugsson (from IFK Norrköping)
88	MF	POR	Filipe da Costa (from Leeds United)

Out: Note: Flags indicate national team as defined under FIFA eligibility rules; some limited exceptions apply. Players may hold more than one non-FIFA nationality.

No.	Pos.	Nation	Player
3	DF	BUL	Aleksandar Tunchev (to Leicester City)
7	FW	BUL	Stoyko Sakaliev (to Spartak Varna, previously on loan at Lokomotiv Plovdiv)
8	MF	BUL	Velizar Dimitrov (to FC Metalurh Donetsk)
9	FW	PAN	José Garcés (to Académica de Coimbra)
10	MF	BUL	Georgi Iliev (to Cherno more)
11	MF	BUL	Emil Gargorov (loan return to RC Strasbourg)
12	GK	BUL	Ivaylo Petrov (to AEK Larnaca)
13	DF	MNE	Nikola Vujadinović (to Udinese)
15	DF	MKD	Robert Petrov (to Panserraikos)
18	MF	ROU	Florentin Petre (to Terek Grozny)
20	MF	BUL	Yordan Yurukov (to Cherno more)
22	GK	BUL	Ilko Pirgov (to CS Otopeni)
99	FW	BRA	Nei (to Al-Shabab Riyadh)

=== Winter transfers ===
In: Note: Flags indicate national team as defined under FIFA eligibility rules; some limited exceptions apply. Players may hold more than one non-FIFA nationality.

No.	Pos.	Nation	Player
2	DF	BUL	Pavel Kovachev (from FBK Kaunas)
9	FW	BUL	Veselin Stoykov (from Pirin Blagoevgrad)
17	FW	POR	Rui Miguel (from Lokomotiv Mezdra)
21	FW	ARG	Germán Pietrobon (from Pirin Blagoevgrad)
27	GK	BUL	Ivaylo Petrov (from AEK Larnaca)
33	MF	POR	David Silva (from Lokomotiv Mezdra)
35	MF	BUL	Asen Georgiev (from Pirin Blagoevgrad)
52	DF	BUL	Yordan Minev (from Botev Plovdiv)
99	FW	BUL	Dormushali Saidhodzha (from Botev Plovdiv)

Out: Note: Flags indicate national team as defined under FIFA eligibility rules; some limited exceptions apply. Players may hold more than one non-FIFA nationality.

No.	Pos.	Nation	Player
2	DF	SRB	Nenad Nastić (to FC Khimki)
9	FW	BUL	Veselin Stoykov (on loan to Pirin Blagoevgrad)
20	DF	SLO	Mitja Mörec (to Slavia Sofia)
26	DF	BUL	Yanko Sandanski (on loan to Marek)
27	DF	NED	Quido Lanzaat (Released)
29	DF	BUL	Dimitar Petkov (on loan to Botev Plovdiv)
35	MF	BUL	Asen Georgiev (on loan to Belasitsa Petrich)
88	MF	POR	Filipe da Costa (to Levski Sofia)
—	MF	BUL	Ivaylo Dimitrov (on loan to Sportist Svoge)

== Pre-season and friendlies ==
Win Draw Loss Fixtures

=== Pre-season ===
9 July 2008 Friendly	Rilski Sportist	1–3	CSKA	Samokov
14:00 EET	Marinov 27'; Aleksov (yellow card) 68'	(Report)	Gyulemetov 10' (o.g.); Todorov 30'; Yordanov 61'; Machado (yellow card) 45'; Yordanov (yellow card) 51'	Stadium: Iskar; Attendance: 200; Referee: Emil Kirov

12 July 2008 Friendly	CSKA	2–0	Spartak Pleven	Pancharevo
14:00 EET	Toshev 59'; Petkov 86'; I. Dimitrov (yellow card) 72'	(Report)	Todorov (yellow card) 23'	Stadium: CSKA Training Stadium; Attendance: 400; Referee: Angel Angelov

15 July 2008 Friendly	Willem II (Netherlands)	1–0	(Bulgaria) CSKA	Loënga, the Netherlands
15:00 EET	Boutahar 23'; Mathijsen (yellow card) 37'	(Report)		Attendance: 1,200

18 July 2008 Friendly	Cambuur (Netherlands)	1–4	(Bulgaria) CSKA	Hoenderloo, the Netherlands
15:00 EET	Casao 77'	(Report)	Yordanov 46'; Udoji 67', 75'; Zerara 70'

20 July 2008 Friendly	Eintracht Braunschweig (Germany)	1–1	(Bulgaria) CSKA	Braunschweig, Germany
18:30 EET	Kruppke 60'	(Report)	Tonev 23'	Stadium: Eintracht-Stadion; Attendance: 10,000

23 July 2008 Friendly	CSKA (Bulgaria)	1–0	(Israel) Ashdod	Oosterbeek, the Netherlands
15:00 EET	Kurtisi 82'	(Report)

26 July 2008 Friendly	RKC Waalwijk (Netherlands)	1–1	(Bulgaria) CSKA	Oosterbeek, the Netherlands
17:00 EET	Benson 49'	(Report)	Toshev 82'; Machado (yellow card) 53'

4 August 2008 Friendly	CSKA (Bulgaria)	2–0	(Israel) Hapoel Ironi Rishon	Pancharevo
20:00 EET	Zlatinov 45'; I. Dimitrov 48'; Marquinhos (yellow card) 18'	(Report)		Stadium: CSKA Training Stadium; Attendance: 70

=== On-season (autumn) ===
18 August 2008 Friendly	PAOK (Greece)	1–0	(Bulgaria) CSKA	Thessaloniki, Greece
20:00 EET	Konstantinidis 53'	(Report)		Stadium: Toumba; Attendance: 18,000; Referee: Dimitros Kalapoulos (Greece)

5 September 2008 Friendly	Panserraikos (Greece)	2–0	(Bulgaria) CSKA	Serres, Greece
20:00 EET	Aboubakary 4'; Digozis 20'	(Report)	Sandanski (yellow card) 56'	Stadium: Serres; Attendance: 1,500

8 October 2008 Friendly	Pirin 1922	0–4	CSKA	Blagoevgrad
15:00 EET	Mangurev (yellow card) 65'	(Report)	Yordanov 24'; Morozs 38'; Zé Rui 44'; Gunnlaugsson 53'	Stadium: Hristo Botev; Attendance: 4,000; Referee: Hristo Ristoskov

11 October 2008 Friendly	CSKA	2–2	Slavia Sofia	Pancharevo
12:00 EET	Zé Rui 1'; Gunnlaugsson 64'; Zé Rui (red card) 6'	(Report)	N. Petrov 45'; Kerchev 85'; Kerchev (yellow card) 6'; N. Petrov (yellow card) 22'; Ortega (yellow card) 82' (yellow-red card) 84'	Stadium: CSKA Training Stadium; Referee: Aleksandar Kostadinov

=== Mid-season ===
26 January 2009 Friendly	CSKA (Bulgaria)	4–1	(Serbia) FK Jagodina	Ayia Napa, Cyprus
12:00 EET	Alausa 11'; David Silva 22'; Saidhodzha 25'; Todorov 44' (pen.); Machado (yellow card) 23'	(Report)	Alfred 89'; Tomic (red card) 90'	Attendance: 10

28 January 2009 Friendly	CSKA (Bulgaria)	2–1	(Russia) Alania	Ayia Napa, Cyprus
12:00 EET	Kotev 5'; Saidhodzha 28'; Yanchev (yellow card) 42'	(Report)	Dadu 35'; Gnanou (yellow card) 87'	Attendance: 30

30 January 2009 Friendly	CSKA (Bulgaria)	2–1	(Belarus) Dinamo Minsk	Ayia Napa, Cyprus
12:00 EET	Todorov 43'; Marquinhos 74' (pen.); Omodiagbe (yellow card) 88'	(Report)	Kislyak 82'; Chukhley (yellow card) 85'	Attendance: 30

31 January 2009 Friendly	CSKA (Bulgaria)	2–3	(Czech Republic) Viktoria Plzeň	Ayia Napa, Cyprus
12:00 EET	Alausa 18'; Chipev 45' (pen.); Chipev (penalty missed); Chipev (yellow card) 61'	(Report)	Rezek 38' (pen.); Mlika 79'; Tatanashvilli 83'	Attendance: 30

4 February 2009 Albena Cup 2009 Group Stage	CSKA	2–1	Montana	Albena
12:00 EET	Saidhodzha 31'; Tonev 81'; Todorov (yellow card) 38'	(Report)	Harlov 89'; Gadzhev (yellow card) 27'	Attendance: 350; Referee: Radan Miryanov

6 February 2009 Friendly	Kaliakra Kavarna	1–2	CSKA	Kavarna
12:00 EET	Karadzhov 86'	(Report)	Eli Marques 54'; Gunnlaugsson 73'	Stadium: Kavarna; Attendance: 1,000; Referee: Dimcho Radev

7 February 2009 Albena Cup 2009 Group Stage	CSKA	3–0	Spartak Varna	Albena
12:00 EET	Todorov 6'; Saidhodzha 12' (pen.); David Silva 63'; Todorov (yellow card) 27'; Yanchev (yellow card) 65'	(Report)	N. Petrov (yellow card) 43'; Malindi (yellow card) 62'; Miranda (yellow card) 65'; Daniel Morales (red card) 88'	Attendance: 1,300; Referee: Stanislav Todorov

9 February 2009 Albena Cup 2009 Group Stage	CSKA	2–0	Lokomotiv Plovdiv	Albena
12:00 EET	Morozs 20'; Toshev 81' (pen.)	(Report)		Referee: Kolyo Danev

13 February 2009 Albena Cup 2009 Final	CSKA	2–0	Cherno More Varna	Albena
12:00 EET	Saidhodzha 9' (pen.); Yanchev 49'; Machado (yellow card) 75'	(Report)	Manolov (yellow card) 43'	Attendance: 1,500; Referee: Anton Genov

18 February 2008 Friendly	Iraklis (Greece)	1–1	(Bulgaria) CSKA	Thessaloniki, Greece
15:00 EET	Panos 6' (pen.)	(Report)	Saidhodzha 18'	Stadium: Kaftanzoglio; Attendance: 1,500

=== On-season (spring) ===
28 March 2009 Friendly	CSKA	3–0	Balkan Botevgrad	Pancharevo
11:00 EET	Morozs 5'; Lazarov 37'; Sabev 42'	(Report)		Stadium: CSKA Training Stadium; Attendance: 200; Referee: Kalin Lyudmilov

6 June 2009 Friendly	CSKA	2–2	Akademik Sofia	Sofia
11:30 EET	B. Paskov 6'; Zehirov 73'	(Report)	Bozhov 14', 40'	Stadium: Balgarska Armiya; Referee: Georgi Kanchev

== Competitions ==
=== A Group ===
==== Table ====
Pos	Team	Pld	W	D	L	GF	GA	GD	Pts	Qualification or relegation
1	Levski Sofia (C)	30	21	6	3	57	18	+39	69	Qualification for Champions League second qualifying round
2	CSKA Sofia	30	21	5	4	54	22	+32	68	Qualification for Europa League third qualifying round
3	Cherno More	30	18	6	6	48	19	+29	60	Qualification for Europa League second qualifying round
4	Litex Lovech	30	17	7	6	53	26	+27	58	Qualification for Europa League play-off round (Note: Litex Lovech won the 2008–09 Bulgarian Cup and qualified for the play-off round of the UEFA Europa League.)
5	Lokomotiv Sofia	30	16	6	8	52	29	+23	54	

Source: A PFG (in Bulgarian)
Rules for classification: 1st points; 2nd head-to-head points; 3rd head-to-head goal difference; 4th head-to-head goals scored; 5th head-to-head away goals scored; 6th goal difference; 7th goals scored
(C) Champions

==== Results summary ====
Overall								Home						Away					
Pld	W	D	L	GF	GA	GD	Pts	W	D	L	GF	GA	GD	W	D	L	GF	GA	GD
30	21	5	4	54	22	+32	68	13	1	1	29	8	+21	8	4	3	25	14	+11

Last updated: 13 June 2009.
Source: Soccerway

==== Results by round ====
Round	1	2	3	4	5	6	7	8	9	10	11	12	13	14	15	16	17	18	19	20	21	22	23	24	25	26	27	28	29	30
Ground	H	A	H	H	A	H	A	H	A	H	A	H	A	H	A	A	H	A	A	H	A	H	A	H	A	H	A	H	A	H
Result	W	L	W	W	W	W	D	W	W	W	D	D	D	W	D	W	W	W	W	W	W	W	W	W	W	L	L	W	L	W
Position	4	7	3	2	1	1	1	1	1	1	1	1	1	1	2	2	2	2	2	1	1	1	1	1	1	1	2	2	2	2

Source: CSKA Sofia league results
A = Away; H = Home; W = Win; D = Draw; L = Loss

==== Fixtures and results ====
10 August 2008 1	CSKA	1–0	Belasitsa	Blagoevgrad
18:00 EET	Yordanov 36'; Chipev (yellow card) 85'	(Report)	Beto (yellow card) 7'; Trifonov (yellow card) 66'; Hristov (yellow card) 90'	Stadium: Hristo Botev; Attendance: 5,100; Referee: Stanislav Stavrov

15 August 2008 2	Sliven	3–1	CSKA	Sliven
18:00 EET	I. Stoyanov (penalty missed); I. Stoyanov 22', 71'; Kikov 43' (pen.); Bakalov (yellow card) 25'; K. Yanev (yellow card) 32'; Mindev (yellow card) 59'; Kikov (yellow card) 80'; Cenov (yellow card) 49' (yellow-red card) 84'	(Report)	Marquinhos (penalty missed); Eli Marques 58'; Machado (red card) 12'; Bekono (yellow card) 42'; Marquinhos (yellow card) 43'	Stadium: Hadzhi Dimitar; Attendance: 7,540; Referee: Nikolay Yordanov

24 August 2008 3	CSKA	2–0	Lokomotiv Plovdiv	Sofia
18:00 EET	Yordanov 33'; Marquinhos 42'; Marquinhos (yellow card) 51'; Zé Rui (yellow card) 60'	(Report)	Miliev (yellow card) 73'	Stadium: Balgarska Armiya; Attendance: 0 Referee: Radan Miryanov

30 August 2008 4	CSKA	3–0	Spartak Varna	Sofia
20:00 EET	Zé Rui 18'; Todorov 58'; Udoji 79'; Todorov (yellow card) 38'; Kotev (yellow card) 45'; Bekono (yellow card) 81'	(Report)	Ivanović (yellow card) 33'; Morales (yellow card) 56'; Vodenicharov (yellow card) 32' (yellow-red card) 36'	Stadium: Balgarska Armiya; Attendance: 2,420; Referee: Tsvetan Georgiev

14 September 2008 5	Slavia	1–2	CSKA	Sofia
17:00 EET	Kolev 54'; Kavdanski (yellow card) 64'; Deniran (yellow card) 76'; Diop (yellow card) 90+4'	(Report)	Todorov 14'; Yanchev 55'; Marquinhos (yellow card) 59'; Eli Marques (yellow card) 76'; Bekono (yellow card) 90+1'	Stadium: Ovcha Kupel; Attendance: 1,600; Referee: Georgi Ignatov

19 September 2008 6	CSKA	2–0	Minyor	Sofia
19:30 EET	Todorov 20'; Ivanov 59'	(Report)		Stadium: Balgarska Armiya; Attendance: 1,220; Referee: Ventsislav Koznichki

27 September 2008 7	Pirin	2–2	CSKA	Blagoevgrad
16:00 EET	Pietrobon 14', 25'; B. Hazurov (yellow card) 41'; Palankov (yellow card) 57' (yellow-red card) 64'; Chavdarov (yellow card) 85'	(Report)	Marquinhos 44'; Kotev 90+4'; Vidanov (yellow card) 24'; Todorov (yellow card) 26'	Stadium: Hristo Botev; Attendance: 3,230; Referee: Asen Nikolov

4 October 2008 8	CSKA	2–0	Vihren	Sofia
19:30 EET	Udoji 50'; Kotev 90+2'; Udoji (yellow card) 60'; Yanchev (yellow card) 64'	(Report)	Eriverton (yellow card) 30'; Escerdina (yellow card) 45+1' (red card) 52'; Karademitros (yellow card) 60'; Bruno Paes (yellow card) 74'; Hugo Santos (yellow card) 89'	Stadium: Balgarska Armiya; Attendance: 1,310; Referee: Stanislav Todorov

19 October 2008 9	Botev Plovdiv	0–2	CSKA	Plovdiv
16:00 EET	Y. Minev (yellow card) 18'; Avramov (yellow card) 32'; Alegre (yellow card) 90'	(Report)	Morozs 42'; Zlatinov 71'; Branekov (yellow card) 45+3'	Stadium: Hristo Botev; Attendance: 7,250; Referee: Radoslav Stanev

25 October 2008 10	CSKA	2–1	Chernomorets	Sofia
19:30 EET	Manchev 1', 47'; Yanchev (yellow card) 56'	(Report)	Stoimirović 32'; Conkov (yellow card) 10'; N. Nikolov (yellow card) 48'; Márcio Abreu (yellow card) 80'	Stadium: Balgarska Armiya; Attendance: 1,030; Referee: Hristo Ristoskov

1 November 2008 11	Levski	1–1	CSKA	Sofia
18:00 EET	G. Ivanov 66'; M. Ivanov (yellow card) 12'; Lúcio Wagner (yellow card) 45+2'; Petkov (yellow card) 58'; G. Ivanov (yellow card) 66'; Gadzhev (red card) 67'	(Report)	Lazarov 59' (pen.); Lazarov (yellow card) 60'; Morozs (yellow card) 62'; Marquinhos (yellow card) 64'; Yanchev (yellow card) 71'; Yordanov (yellow card) 81'	Stadium: Vasil Levski; Attendance: 17,420; Referee: Stanislav Todorov

8 November 2008 12	CSKA	1–1	Cherno More	Sofia
14:30 EET	Yanchev 66'; Bekono (yellow card) 68'; Yanchev (yellow card) 83'	(Report)	Manolov 72'; Alex (yellow card) 45'; Yurukov (yellow card) 66'; Dyakov (yellow card) 75'; Ilchev (yellow card) 90+1'	Stadium: Balgarska Armiya; Attendance: 1,250; Referee: Georgi Ignatov

15 November 2008 13	Lokomotiv Sofia	1–1	CSKA	Sofia
14:30 EET	Bandalovski 62'; Džaferović (yellow card) 14'; Dyakov (yellow card) 65'	(Report)	Lazrov 45'; Zlatinov (yellow card) 23'; Ivanov (yellow card) 51'; Lazarov (yellow card) 64'; Kotev (yellow card) 74'	Stadium: Lokomotiv; Attendance: 1,300; Referee: Hristo Ristoskov

23 November 2008 14	CSKA	2–0	Litex	Sofia
16:00 EET	Manchev 24', 37'; Marquinhos (yellow card) 70'; Eli Marques (yellow card) 90+3'	(Report)	Barthe (yellow card) 26'; Tom (yellow card) 30' (yellow-red card) 66'	Stadium: Balgarska Armiya; Attendance: 880; Referee: Anton Genov

28 November 2008 15	Lokomotiv Mezdra	2–2	CSKA	Mezdra
14:00 EET	Simonović 72', 90+2'; Simonović (yellow card) 33'; Iliev (yellow card) 62'; Cvetković (yellow card) 4' (red card) 76'	(Report)	Todorov 59', 77' (pen.); Costa (yellow card) 32'	Stadium: Lokomotiv; Attendance: 3,690; Referee: Stanislav Todorov

7 March 2009 16	Belasitsa	0–3	CSKA	Blagoevgrad
15:30 EET	Bicaj (yellow card) 3'; Genov (yellow card) 65'	(Report)	Todorov 18'; David Silva 25'; Saidhodzha 42'; Kotev (yellow card) 52'; Yanchev (yellow card) 62'	Stadium: Hristo Botev; Attendance: 1,780; Referee: Stanislav Todorov

14 March 2009 17	CSKA	3–0	Sliven	Sofia
15:30 EET	Saidhodzha 38', 58'; Udoji 79'; Marquinhos (yellow card) 50'; Todorov (yellow card) 76'; Minev (yellow card) 83'	(Report)	Karamatev (yellow card) 26'; Zafirov (yellow card) 31'; Mindev (yellow card) 66'	Stadium: Balgarska Armiya; Attendance: 2,090; Referee: Stefan Spasov

18 March 2009 18	Lokomotiv Plovdiv	1–3	CSKA	Plovdiv
13:00 EET	Delibašić 45+2' (pen.); Milutinović (yellow card) 29'	(Report)	Ivanov 9'; Rui Miguel 54', 90+2'; Ivanov (yellow card) 48'	Stadium: Lauta; Attendance: 4,250; Referee: Hristo Ristoskov

21 March 2009 19	Spartak Varna	0–2	CSKA	Varna
15:30 EET	N. Petrov (yellow card) 40'; Morales (yellow card) 54'	(Report)	Rui Miguel 21'; Ivanov 63'; Rui Miguel (yellow card) 82'	Stadium: Spartak; Attendance: 2,520; Referee: Georgi Ignatov

5 April 2009 20	CSKA	2–1	Slavia	Sofia
19:30 EET	Todorov 22' (pen.), 77' (pen.); Minev 31'; Todorov (yellow card) 40'; Marquinhos (yellow card) 79'; Saidhodzha (yellow card) 84'	(Report)	Ortega 13'; Ortega (yellow card) 14'; Popara (yellow card) 15'; Mörec (yellow card) 21'; Kerchev (yellow card) 36'; R. Petrov (yellow card) 75'	Stadium: Balgarska Armiya; Attendance: 5,330; Referee: Angel Angelov

11 April 2009 21	Minyor	0–1	CSKA	Pernik
13:00 EET	Cvetkov (yellow card) 39'	(Report)	Ivanov 7'; Saidhodzha (yellow card) 80'; Vidanov (yellow card) 84'	Stadium: Minyor; Attendance: 4,220; Referee: Anton Genov

18 April 2009 22	CSKA	4–1	Pirin	Sofia
19:00 EET	Saidhodzha 2', 41'; Kotev 38'; Todorov 86'; Kotev (yellow card) 20'; Todorov (yellow card) 73'	(Report)	Peev 45'; Rizov (yellow card) 36'	Stadium: Balgarska Armiya; Attendance: 2,540; Referee: Vihren Manev

10 April 2009 23	Vihren	1–4	CSKA	Kyustendil
15:00 EET	Jayeoba 70'	(Report)	Ivanov 41'; Tonev 64', 87'; Saidhodzha 79'; Kotev (yellow card) 21'; Marquinhos (yellow card) 43'; Vidanov (yellow card) 68'; Saidhodzha (yellow card) 72'	Stadium: Osogovo; Attendance: 2,370; Referee: Stefan Spasov

26 April 2009 24	CSKA	2–1	Botev Plovdiv	Sofia
19:30 EET	Yanchev 59'; Rui Miguel 63'	(Report)	Garov 45+3'; Andonov (yellow card) 41'; Bozhkov (yellow card) 75'	Stadium: Balgarska Armiya; Attendance: 2,300; Referee: Georgi Dimitrov

2 May 2009 25	Chernomorets	0–1	CSKA	Burgas
18:00 EET		(Report)	Saidhodzha 50'; Marquinhos (yellow card) 65'	Stadium: Lazur; Attendance: 7,320; Referee: Hristo Ristoskov

9 May 2009 26	CSKA	0–2	Levski	Sofia
18:00 EET	Vidanov (yellow card) 50'; Udoji (red card) 71'; Yanchev (yellow card) 89'	(Report)	Hristov 36'; Zé Soares 59'; Tasevski (yellow card) 29'; V. Minev (yellow card) 40'; Gadzhev (yellow card) 54'; Milanov (yellow card) 80'	Stadium: Vasil Levski; Attendance: 19,350; Referee: Stefan Spasov

16 May 2009 27	Cherno More	1–0	CSKA	Varna
18:00 EET	Yurukov 7'; Alex (penalty missed); Dyakov (yellow card) 37'	(Report)	Lazarov (penalty missed); Rui Miguel (yellow card) 10'; Marquinhos (yellow card) 11'; Kotev (yellow card) 46'; Todorov (yellow card) 90+4'	Stadium: Ticha; Attendance: 12,000; Referee: Hristo Ristoskov

23 May 2009 28	CSKA	1–0	Lokomotiv Sofia	Sofia
17:00 EET	Markov 6' (o.g.); Rui Miguel (yellow card) 52'; Zehirov (yellow card) 61'; Morozs (yellow card) 63'; Ivanov (yellow card) 71'; Petrov (yellow card) 76'; Minev (yellow card) 78' (yellow-red card) 90'	(Report)	I. Paskov (yellow card) 33' (yellow-red card) 44'; Baldovaliev (yellow card) 54'	Stadium: Vasil Levski; Attendance: 2,690; Referee: Georgi Ignatov

31 May 2009 29	Litex	1–0	CSKA	Lovech
17:00 EET	Doka 46'; Sándor (yellow card) 55'; Kishishev (yellow card) 70'; Sandrinho (yellow card) 82'	(Report)	Todorov (yellow card) 17'; Branekov (yellow card) 28'; Eli Marques (yellow card) 57' (yellow-red card) 81'	Stadium: Gradski; Attendance: 3,780; Referee: Stanislav Todorov

16 June 2009 30	CSKA	2–1	Lokomotiv Mezdra	Mezdra
18:00 EET	Morozs 53'; Zehirov 75'; Sabev (yellow card) 3'; Tonev (yellow card) 51'; Morozs (yellow card) 57'	(Report)	Bamba 85'; Karaneychev (yellow card) 40'; Iliev (yellow card) 81'	Stadium: Lokomotiv; Attendance: 400; Referee: Dimitar Andreev

=== Bulgarian Super Cup ===
3 August 2008 Final	CSKA	1–0	Litex	Sofia
20:00 EET	Kotev 64'; Todorov (yellow card) 39'; Yordanov (yellow card) 52'; Chipev (yellow card) 70'; Tonev (yellow card) 86'; Kotev (yellow card) 90+2'	Report	Angelov (yellow card) 30'; Sandrinho (yellow card) 43'	Stadium: Vasil Levski; Attendance: 6,000; Referee: Nikolay Yordanov

=== Bulgarian Cup ===
12 November 2008 Second Round	CSKA	2–1 (a.e.t.)	Lokomotiv Plovdiv	Sofia
17:00 EET	Marquinhos 29'; Yanchev 112'; Machado (yellow card) 10'; Marquinhos (yellow card) 38'; Mörec (yellow card) 63'	Report	Tom 53'; Miliev (yellow card) 32'; A. Todorov (yellow card) 21' (yellow-red card) 65'; Tom (yellow card) 83'; Mechedzhiev (yellow card) 102'	Stadium: Balgarska Armiya; Attendance: 1,000; Referee: Ahmed Ahmed

7 December 2008 Third Round	Balkan	0–5	CSKA	Botevgrad
16:00 EET	Stepanov (yellow card) 24'; B. Georgiev (yellow card) 27'	Report	Gunnlaugsson 7'; Kotev 33'; Toshev 39', 51'; Marquinhos 84'	Stadium: Hristo Botev; Attendance: 8,000; Referee: Tsvetan Georgiev

4 March 2009 Quarterfinal	CSKA	1–1 (a.e.t.) (3–5 p)	Pirin	Sofia
16:00 EET	Marquinhos 58'	Report	Delev 70'; Bodurov (yellow card) 49'; Delev (yellow card) 71'; Koemdzhiev (yellow card) 90+4'; Kotsev (yellow card) 98' (yellow-red card) 110'	Stadium: Balgarska Armiya; Attendance: 4,230; Referee: Anton Genov
	Penalties
	Todorov (penalty scored); Saidhodzha (penalty scored); Toshev (penalty scored); Marquinhos (penalty missed)		(penalty scored) Nakov; (penalty scored) B. Hazurov; (penalty scored) Peev; (penalty scored) Palankov; (penalty scored) Galchev

== See also ==
- PFC CSKA Sofia
