= 2008–09 Bulgarian Cup =

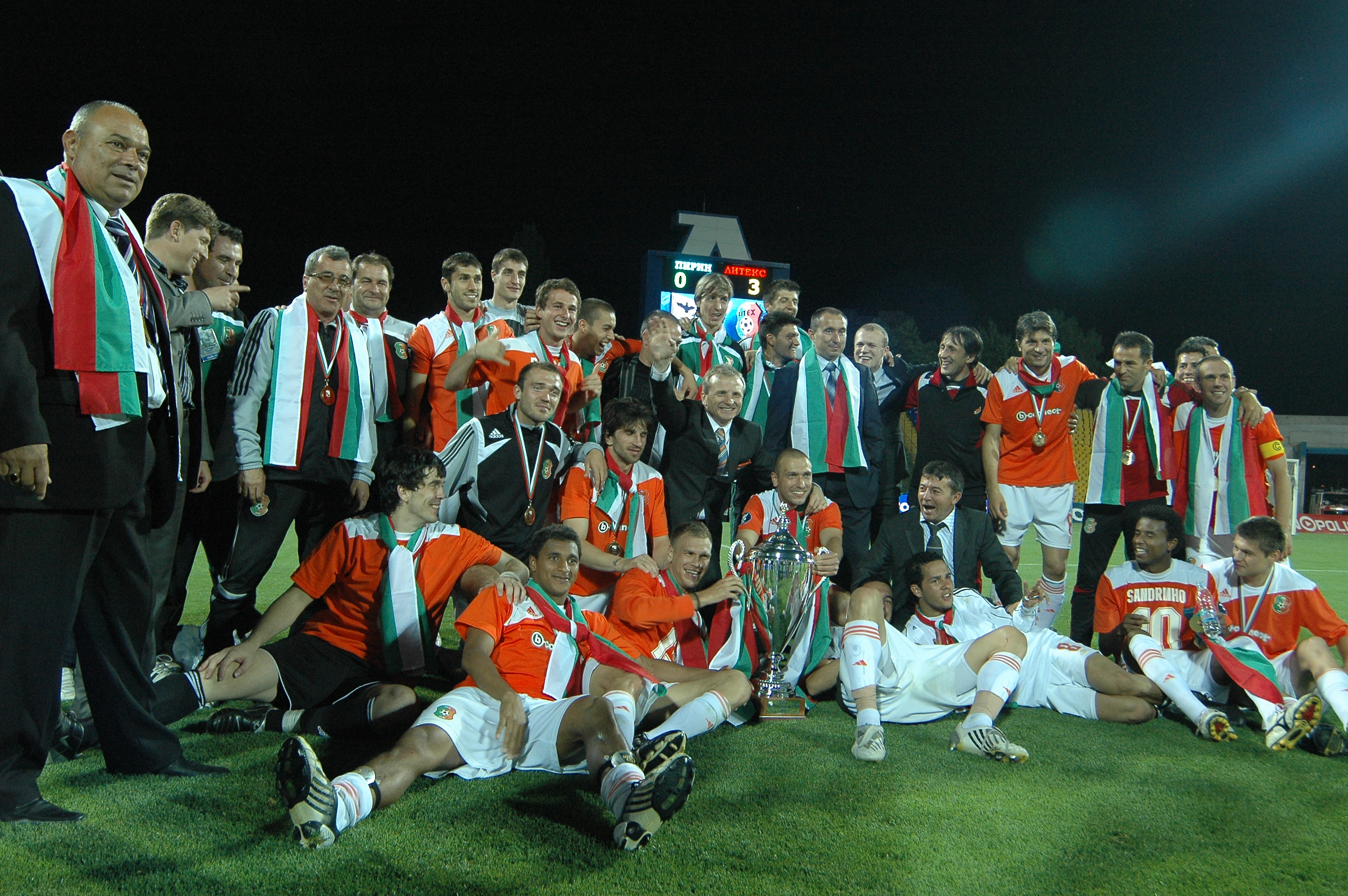
- Litex Lovech, winners of the 2008–09 Bulgarian Cup

Tournament details
- Country: Bulgaria

Final positions
- Champions: Litex Lovech (4th title)
- Runners-up: Pirin Blagoevgrad

The 2008–09 Bulgarian Cup was the 27th season of the annual knockout football tournament for Bulgaria. The competition started on 15 October 2008 with the preliminary round and ended on 26 May 2009. The defending champions were Litex Lovech, who successfully defended their title against Pirin Blagoevgrad and resultantly qualified for the 2009–10 UEFA Europa League.

== Preliminary round ==
Seven teams entered the preliminary round: four teams from the amateur level, plus three teams from the B Group. Six of the teams played against another opponent, while the seventh team, amateur side Almus Bier, received a bye to the first round of the cup. The matches were played on 15 October 2008. Of the professional teams, only Akademik Sofia lost, suffering a 3–0 defeat away to Slivnishki Geroy.

Team 1	Score	Team 2
15 October 2008
Slivnishki Geroy (III)	3–0	Akademik Sofia (II)
Brestnik 1948 (III)	1–3	Pirin Gotse Delchev (II)
Dorostol 2003 (III)	1–2 (a.e.t.)	Chavdar Etropole (II)
Almus Beer (IV)	bye	

Note: Roman numerals in brackets denote the league tier the clubs participated in during the 2008–09 season.

== First round ==
The first round included the four teams advancing from the preliminary round as well as the remaining 28 teams from the B Group. The matches were played on 29 October 2008. Both amateur teams were eliminated in this round. In a close series of matches, five games went to extra time and in three cases the teams were separated after a penalty shootout.

Team 1	Score	Team 2
29 October 2008
Etar-1924 (II)	1–3	Pirin Blagoevgrad (1922) (II)
Belite orli (II)	0–2	Balkan Botevgrad (II)
Slivnishki Geroy (III)	2–2 (a.e.t.) (2–4 p)	Pirin Gotse Delchev (II)
Botev Krivodol (II)	1–0	Beroe (II)
Marek (II)	0–0 (a.e.t.) (4–5 p)	Minyor (II)
Almus Beer (IV)	0–3	Vidima-Rakovski (II)
Spartak Plovdiv (II)	1–0	Dunav Ruse (II)
Chavdar Etropole (II)	3–1	Kom-Minyor (II)
Sportist Svoge (II)	1–0	Lokomotiv Stara Zagora (II)
Svetkavitsa (II)	1–1 (a.e.t.) (4–5 p)	Montana (II)
Lyubimetz 2007 (II)	2–1 (a.e.t.)	Svilengrad 1921 (II)
Spartak Pleven (II)	0–2	Chernomorets Balchik (II)
Nesebar (II)	2–1 (a.e.t.)	Naftex (II)
Chavdar (II)	2–0	Rilski Sportist (II)
Maritsa (II)	2–1	Shumen (II)
Rodopa Smolyan (II)	2–1	Kaliakra Kavarna (II)

== Second round ==
The 16 teams from A Group entered in the second round, joining the 16 winners from the first round. The matches were played from 11 November to 3 December 2008. Six of the ties required extra time, but no penalty shootouts were required.

Team 1	Score	Team 2
11 November 2008
Lyubimetz 2007 (II)	1–2	Vihren Sandanski
Minyor (II)	0–2	OFC Sliven
12 November 2008
Balkan Botevgrad (II)	1–0	Lokomotiv Mezdra
Spartak Varna	1–2	Pirin Blagoevgrad (1931) (II)
Vidima-Rakovski (II)	1–0	Chavdar Etropole (II)
Litex Lovech	2–0	Botev Plovdiv
CSKA Sofia	2–1 (a.e.t.)	Lokomotiv Plovdiv
Chavdar (II)	1–2	Spartak Plovdiv (II)
Pirin Gotse Delchev (II)	3–0	Belasitsa Petrich
Maritsa (II)	2–0	Sportist Svoge (II)
Nesebar (II)	1–0 (a.e.t.)	Chernomorets Balchik (II)
Montana (II)	2–0 (a.e.t.)	Pirin Blagoevgrad (1922)
13 November 2008
Botev Krivodol (II)	2–1	Slavia Sofia
Rodopa Smolyan (II)	2–1 (a.e.t.)	Chernomorets Burgas
26 November 2008
Lokomotiv Sofia	1–2 (a.e.t.)	Levski Sofia
3 December 2008
Minyor Pernik	2–1 (a.e.t.)	Cherno More Varna

== Third round ==
The third round was played on 7 December 2008 and featured the 16 winners of round two. The biggest win of the third round was CSKA Sofia's 5–0 victory at Balkan Botevgrad.

Team 1	Score	Team 2
7 December 2008
Montana (II)	0–2	Pirin Blagoevgrad (1931) (II)
Spartak Plovdiv (II)	2–3	Vihren Sandanski
Maritsa (II)	1–5	Litex Lovech
Balkan Botevgrad (II)	0–5	CSKA Sofia
Vidima-Rakovski (II)	0–3	Minyor Pernik
Rodopa Smolyan (II)	1–3	Botev Krivodol (II)
Nesebar (II)	2–1	Pirin Gotse Delchev (II)
Levski Sofia	2–1 (a.e.t.)	OFC Sliven

== Quarter-finals ==
The quarter-finals were held on 4 March 2009. All four away teams won their matches to advance to the semi-final stage.

4 March 2009	Vihren Sandanski	0–2	Levski Sofia	Kyustendil
14:00 EET		Report	G. Ivanov 13'; Tasevski 28'	Stadium: Osogovo; Attendance: 1,630; Referee: Nikolay Yordanov (Sofia)

4 March 2009	Botev Krivodol (II)	1–4	Minyor Pernik	Byala Slatina
14:30 EET	Vladinov 87'	Report	Hazurov 17', 33'; Janković 63'; Rumenov 78'	Stadium: Chavdar; Attendance: 2,750; Referee: Ivaylo Stoyanov (Petrich)

4 March 2009	Nesebar (II)	1–5	Litex Lovech	Nesebar
14:30 EET	Hristov 9'	Report	Popov 28' 71'; Doka 60'; Bibishkov 75'; Cvetanov 77'	Stadium: Gradski; Attendance: 680; Referee: Angel Angelov (Sofia)

4 March 2009	CSKA Sofia	1–1 (a.e.t.) (3–5 p)	Pirin Blagoevgrad (1931) (II)	Sofia
16:00 EET	Marquinhos 58'	Report	Delev 70'	Stadium: Balgarska Armiya; Attendance: 2,130; Referee: Anton Genov (Gabrovo)
	Penalties
	Todorov (penalty scored); Saidhodzha (penalty scored); Toshev (penalty scored); Marquinhos (penalty missed)		(penalty scored) Nakov; (penalty scored) Hazurov; (penalty scored) Peev; (penalty scored) Palankov; (penalty scored) Galchev

== Semi-finals ==
Both semi-finals were held on 29 April 2009. Litex Lovech beat Minyor Pernik, and Pirin Blagoevgrad (1931) defeated Levski Sofia, in each case by a single goal.

29 April 2009	Minyor Pernik	0–1	Litex Lovech	Pernik
14:00 EEST			Bibishkov 57'	Stadium: Minyor; Attendance: 5,000; Referee: Stanislav Todorov (Shumen)

29 April 2009	Pirin Blagoevgrad (1931) (II)	1–0	Levski Sofia	Blagoevgrad
16:30 EEST	Peev 56'			Stadium: Hristo Botev; Attendance: 6,000; Referee: Georgi Ignatov (Sofia)

== Final ==
Last season's winners Litex Lovech defended their title with a 3–0 win against Pirin Blagoevgrad (1931) at the Georgi Asparuhov Stadium in Sofia. By winning, Litex Lovech ensured they would enter in the third qualifying round of the following season's UEFA Europa League. The game was broadcast live on Bulgarian National Television.

26 May 2009
20:30

Pirin Blagoevgrad (1931)	0–3	Litex Lovech
		Niflore 20'; Doka 72'; Bibishkov 86'

Georgi Asparuhov, Sofia
Attendance: 9,500
Referee: Stefan Spasov (Pernik)
