= Hazurov =

Hazurov (Bulgarian: Хазуров) is a Bulgarian surname. Notable people with the surname include:

- Borislav Hazurov (born 1985), Bulgarian footballer
- Kostadin Hazurov (born 1985), Bulgarian footballer
