= Chavdarov =

Chavdarov (Bulgarian: Чавдаров), female form Chavdarova (Bulgarian: Чавдарова), is a Bulgarian/Macedonian surname. Notable people with this surname include:

- Iliyan Chavdarov (born 1991), Bulgarian football player
- Nikolay Chavdarov (born 1976), Bulgarian football player
- Rumyana Chavdarova (born 1950), Bulgarian middle-distance runner
- Zdravko Chavdarov (born 1981), Bulgarian football player
