= Yanko Sandanski =

Bulgarian footballer

Personal information
- Full name: Yanko Petrov Sandanski
- Date of birth: 23 November 1988 (age 37)
- Place of birth: Kresna, Bulgaria
- Height: 1.80 m (5 ft 11 in)
- Position: Central midfielder

Youth career
- Pirin Blagoevgrad
- CSKA Sofia

Senior career*
Years	Team	Apps	(Gls)
2007–2009	CSKA Sofia	3	(0)
2007	→ Beroe (loan)	13	(0)
2009	→ Marek (loan)	12	(1)
2010–2011	Pirin Blagoevgrad	42	(2)
2011	Montana	15	(1)
2012–2014	Slavia Sofia	59	(4)
2014–2015	Lokomotiv Plovdiv	21	(0)
2015–2016	Pirin Blagoevgrad	22	(1)
2017–2018	Septemvri Sofia	33	(1)
2018–2020	CSKA 1948	42	(2)
2020	Vitosha Bistritsa	6	(0)
2020	Minyor Pernik	5	(0)

International career
2008–2009	Bulgaria U21	4	(0)
- * Club domestic league appearances and goals as of 23 March 2022

Yanko Petrov Sandanski (Bulgarian: Янко Петров Сандански; born 23 November 1988) is a Bulgarian professional footballer who plays as a midfielder.

== Career ==
He is defensive midfielder. Yanko was raised in CSKA Sofia's youth teams. He is a grandson of Yane Sandanski.

In January 2017, Sandanski joined Septemvri Sofia. He left the club at the end of the 2017–18 season when his contract expired.

== Honours ==
- Bulgarian Supercup: 2008 (with CSKA Sofia)
