= Dzhihat Kyamil =

Bulgarian footballer

Personal information
- Full name: Dzhihat Iskender Kyamil
- Date of birth: 4 August 1989 (age 37)
- Place of birth: Sofia, Bulgaria
- Height: 1.78 m (5 ft 10 in)
- Position: Midfielder

Team information
- Current team: Pavlikeni
- Number: 23

Youth career
- CSKA Sofia

Senior career*
Years	Team	Apps	(Gls)
2008–2009	CSKA Sofia	1	(0)
2009–2010	Volov Shumen	24	(4)
2010–2012	Etar 1924	39	(1)
2012	Nesebar	13	(8)
2013	Vereya	11	(1)
2013–2014	Spartak Varna	24	(4)
2014	Haskovo	11	(0)
2015–2017	Etar	73	(21)
2018	Arda	19	(10)
2019	Lokomotiv Sofia	9	(1)
2019–	Pavlikeni	0	(0)
- * Club domestic league appearances and goals as of 1 June 2019

Dzhihat Kyamil (Bulgarian: Джихат Кямил, Turkish: Cihat Kyamil; born 4 August 1989) is a Bulgarian footballer who plays as a midfielder for Pavlikeni.

== Career ==
Dzihat made his competitive debut for CSKA Sofia in the last match of 2008-09 season against Lokomotiv Mezdra.

== Awards ==
- Bulgarian Supercup - 1 time - 2008 (with CSKA Sofia)
