= Germán Pietrobon =

Argentine footballer

Personal information
- Full name: Germán Ariel Pietrobon
- Date of birth: 1 April 1983 (age 43)
- Place of birth: San Juan, Argentina
- Height: 1.78 m (5 ft 10 in)
- Position: Striker

Team information
- Current team: Defensores de Belgrano

Youth career
- 1993–2002: Rosario Central

Senior career*
Years	Team	Apps	(Gls)
2005–2006	San Martín (SJ)	11	(6)
2006–2007	Central Córdoba	21	(9)
2007–2009	Pirin Blagoevgrad	44	(15)
2009	CSKA Sofia	0	(0)
2009–2010	Sportist Svoge	12	(1)
2010–	Defensores de Belgrano	0	(0)
- * Club domestic league appearances and goals

Germán Ariel Pietrobon (born 1 April 1983, in Rosario) is an Argentine football striker.

== Club career ==
Pietrobon came through the youth system of Rosario Central, but before making his first team debut, he was transferred to CA San Martín, he then had a spell with Central Córdoba before signing with the Bulgarian club Pirin Blagoevgrad.

After 2 seasons with Pirin he signed CSKA Sofia. Pietrobon underwent trials with FC BATE Borisov, as CSKA Sofia had reached the limit of non-EU players they could use on the field, but the talks with the Belarusians eventually failed to materialize and he returned to CSKA Sofia. On 7 September 2009, Pietrobon terminated his contract with CSKA with immediate effect after a meeting with the club's bosses. A few days later, he signed with Sportist Svoge for one year.
