= Nikolay Petrov (footballer) =

Bulgarian footballer

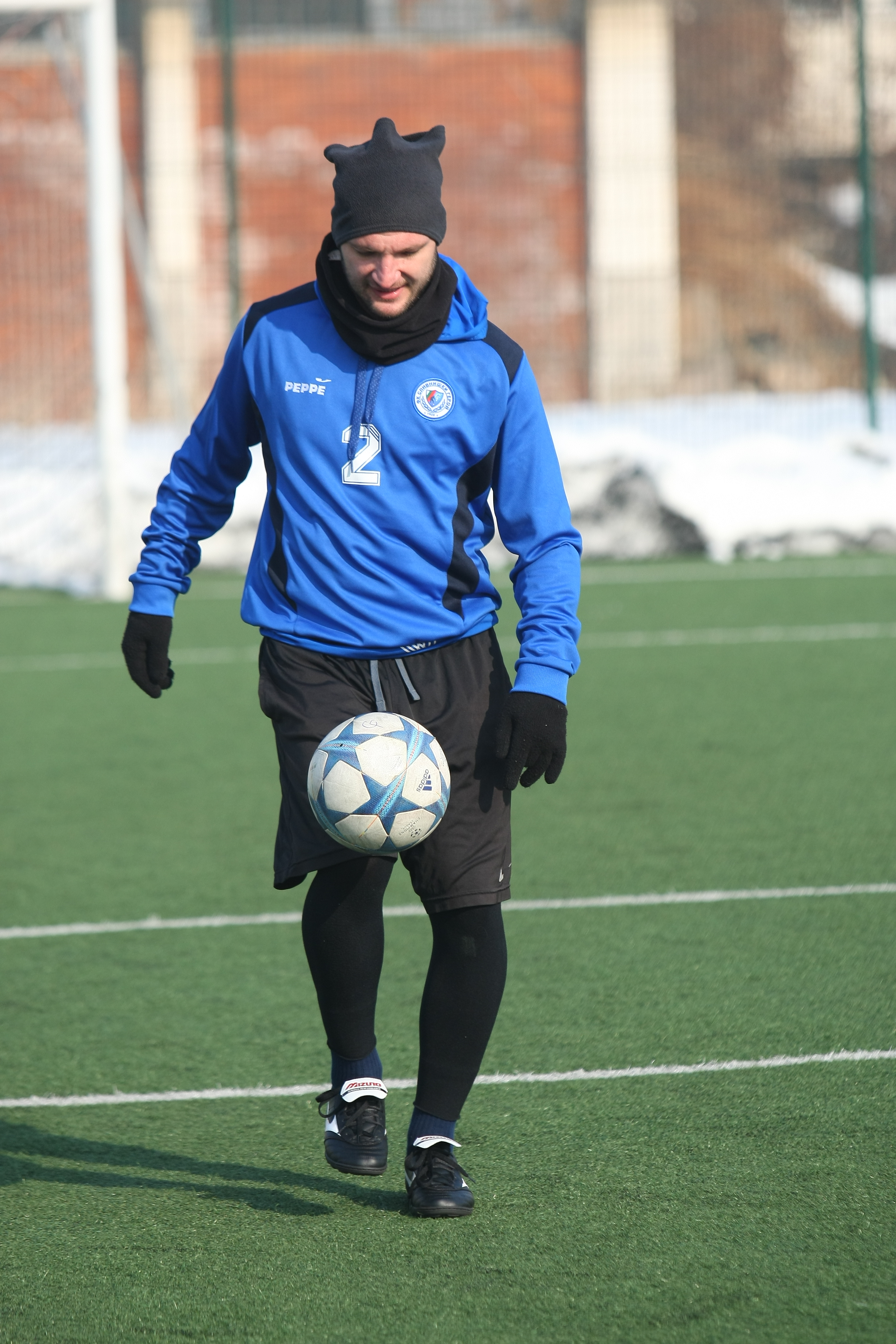
- Petrov in 2017

Personal information
- Full name: Nikolay Valeriev Petrov
- Date of birth: 30 September 1988 (age 38)
- Place of birth: Byala, Bulgaria
- Height: 1.86 m (6 ft 1 in)
- Position: Midfielder

Senior career*
Years	Team	Apps	(Gls)
2004–2006	Levski Sofia	1	(0)
2006–2010	Slavia Sofia	56	(2)
2009	→ Spartak Varna (loan)	13	(0)
2010–2011	Kaliakra	23	(0)
2011	Svetkavitsa	10	(0)
2012	Etar 1924	23	(1)
2013	Dobrudzha Dobrich	?	(0)
2013	Dunav Ruse	6	(0)
2014	Lokomotiv GO	7	(0)
2014	Etar	–	(–)
2015	Dobrudzha Dobrich	11	(0)
2015	Vereya	4	(0)
2016	FC Sofia	?	(?)
2016	Tsarsko Selo	1	(0)
2017–2018	Slivnishki Geroy	?	(?)
2018	Spartak Varna	2	(0)
2018–2019	Dobrudzha Dobrich	14	(0)

International career
2007–2009	Bulgaria U21	4	(0)
- * Club domestic league appearances and goals as of 1 June 2019

Nikolay Petrov (Bulgarian: Николай Петров; born 30 September 1988 in Byala) is a Bulgarian football midfielder.

== Career ==
Petrov joined the newly promoted in V Group team FC Sofia on 19 January 2016, after the new manager Todor Yanchev was hired. The team will eventually change its name to "Tsarsko Selo". In January 2017, Petrov joined Slivnishki Geroy.

In July 2018, Petrov joined Spartak Varna.
