= Krum Bibishkov =

Bulgarian association football player (born 1982)

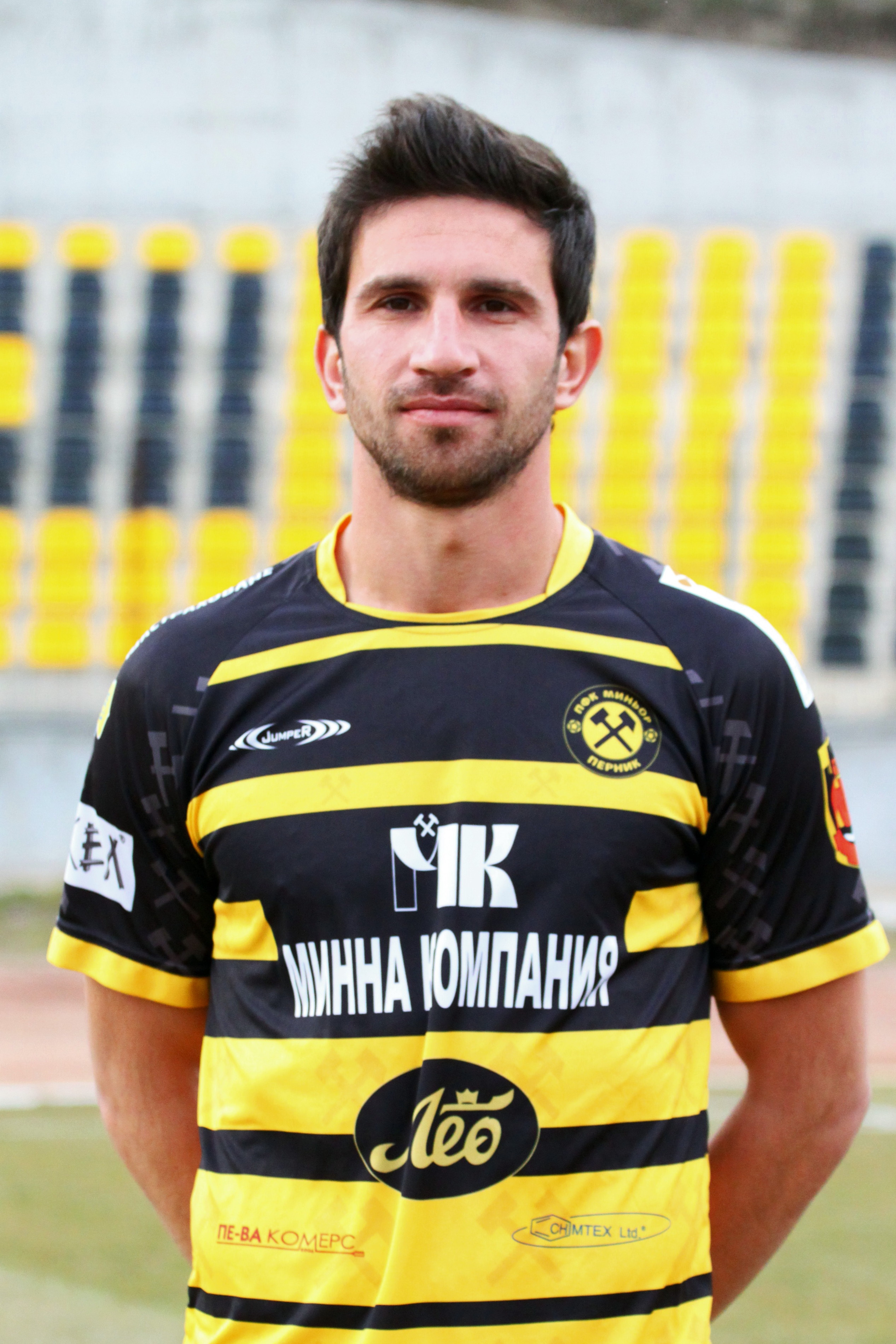
- Bibishkov with Minyor Pernik in 2011

Personal information
- Full name: Krum Georgiev Bibishkov
- Date of birth: 2 September 1982 (age 44)
- Place of birth: Marikostinovo, Bulgaria
- Height: 1.90 m (6 ft 3 in)
- Position: Forward

Youth career
- Pirin Blagoevgrad

Senior career*
Years	Team	Apps	(Gls)
1998–1999	Pirin Blagoevgrad	6	(1)
1999	Bayern Munich II	0	(0)
2000–2001	Levski Sofia	2	(1)
2001–2002	Beroe Stara Zagora	27	(7)
2002–2004	Marek Dupnitsa	52	(15)
2004–2006	Maritimo	28	(6)
2005–2006	→ Penafiel (loan)	19	(3)
2007–2009	Litex Lovech	60	(27)
2009–2010	Steaua București	1	(0)
2010	Académica	1	(0)
2010	Hapoel Ramat Gan	12	(3)
2011	Pirin Blagoevgrad	8	(1)
2011–2012	Minyor Pernik	33	(10)
2013	Lokomotiv Sofia	23	(4)
2014–2016	Marek Dupnitsa	28	(4)
2016	Brantford Galaxy		
2017	Scarborough SC	15	(5)
2018	SC Real Mississauga		
2020	Scarborough SC		

International career
2000–2003	Bulgaria U21	21	(4)
2001	Bulgaria	1	(0)

Managerial career
- 2017: Scarborough SC (player-coach)
- 2018–2019: SC Real Mississauga (player-coach)
- * Club domestic league appearances and goals

Krum Georgiev Bibishkov (Bulgarian: Крум Георгиев Бибишков; born 2 September 1982) is a Bulgarian professional football coach and former player.

His son, Marsel Bibishkov, is also a footballer, currently playing for Vancouver FC.

== Club career ==
=== Early career ===
He started his career in his hometown of Blagoevgrad, where he represented the local team Pirin. He played for Pirin Blagoevgrad in six matches, scoring a goal. In August 1999, Bayern Munich signed Bibishkov. In July 2000, he returned to Bulgaria, signing a contract with Levski Sofia. In June 2002, Bibishkov transferred to Marek Dupnitsa, where he played in his first continental tournament, the UEFA Intertoto Cup.

=== Portugal ===
In June 2005, he signed with Portuguese Maritimo. He would also have a loan spell with division rivals Penafiel the following season.

=== Litex Lovech ===
In January 2007, Bibishkov returned to Bulgaria and was transferred to Litex Lovech. Throughout the season, he played in the 2007–08 UEFA Cup and was named the club's player of the year. He also added some silverware to the club's trophy cabinet by winning the 2007–08 Bulgarian Cup. Bibishkov was re-signed for the following season, where once more he aided the club in successfully defending the Bulgarian cup. He would also finish as the club's top goal scorer. After a productive tenure with Litex, he announced his intention to play abroad.

=== Europe ===
On 6 July 2009, he signed a three-year contract as a free transfer with Romanian team Steaua București. During his tenure in București, he participated in the 2009–10 UEFA Europa League, where he made his debut for the club against Motherwell F.C. After appearing in one match for the Romanian side, he was released after a falling out with the club's management.

In the winter of 2010, he returned to the Portuguese top-tier division to sign with Académica de Coimbra.

=== Israel ===
In the summer of 2010, he was initially invited to a trial run with Israeli side Hapoel Ramat Gan Givatayim. After an impressive trial, he signed a one-year contract with an option to play in the Israeli premier league. His tenure in the Middle East was short-lived as his contract with the club was mutually terminated in the winter of 2011.

=== Bulgaria ===
Following his departure from Israel, he would play the remainder of the season with his former club Pirin Blagoevgrad. His stint with Pirin would last six months as he would sign with division rivals Minyor Pernik for the following season. Bibishkov would extend his tenure with Pernik for another season. However, his second season with Pernik was cut short as he requested a release from his contract in November 2012.

He finished off the season with Lokomotiv Sofia. After a season and a half with Lokomotiv, he left the club to seek more playing opportunities. Marek Dupnitsa of the Bulgarian second division would sign Bibishkov for the remainder of the campaign. He would help the club in securing promotion to the country's top-tier league by winning the league title. He re-signed with Marek for the next season but departed during the winter transfer market due to the club's financial troubles.

=== Canada ===
In the summer of 2016, Bibishkov played in the Southern Ontario-based Canadian Soccer League with the Brantford Galaxy. He would debut for Brantford on May 24, 2016, against Toronto Atomic. Several weeks later, he would record his first goal for the club on June 13, 2016, against Scarborough SC. He would assist the club in securing a playoff berth by finishing seventh in the league's first division. Their postseason run ended in the first round after a defeat to FC Ukraine United.

The following season, division rivals Scarborough SC recruited him as their player-coach. He also played for SC Real Mississauga in the 2018 season. In 2020, he returned to Scarborough, where he was selected for the squad that faced Vorkuta in the championship final but was defeated by a score of 2–1.

== Managerial career ==
While in the CSL, he transitioned to managing in 2017, where he was appointed in the capacity of a player-coach for Scarborough SC. In his debut season at the helm with Scarborough, he led the eastern Toronto side to a playoff berth. Their first opponent in the playoff tournament was Brantford, where Scarborough successfully advanced to the next round. In the second round, the club defeated FC Vorkuta in a penalty shootout that marked the club's first championship final appearance. However, the York Region Shooters would defeat the eastern Toronto club in the championship final by a penalty shootout.

He would also become involved at the grassroots level by serving as the U-11 head coach for the CFA academy. In 2018, he became involved with SC Real Mississauga and operated as a player-coach after the academy received a franchise in the Canadian Soccer League.

In his first season with Mississauga, he led the team to the playoffs by finishing seventh in the first-division standings. Bibishkov would appear in the quarterfinal match against Vorkuta, where Mississauga was eliminated from the competition. He would resume his coaching duties for the 2019 season, where the club failed to secure a postseason berth.

After the COVID-19 pandemic in 2020, he left the academy and returned to his native country.

== International career ==
Bibishkov was part of the Bulgarian national under-21 team and made one appearance for the senior side in 2001.

== Honours ==
PFC Litex Lovech

- Bulgarian Cup: 2007–08, 2008–09

Marek Dupnitsa

- Second League: 2013–2014

Scarborough SC

- Canadian Soccer League First Division: 2020
- CSL Championship runner-up: 2017
