= Filipe Machado =

Brazilian footballer (1984–2016)

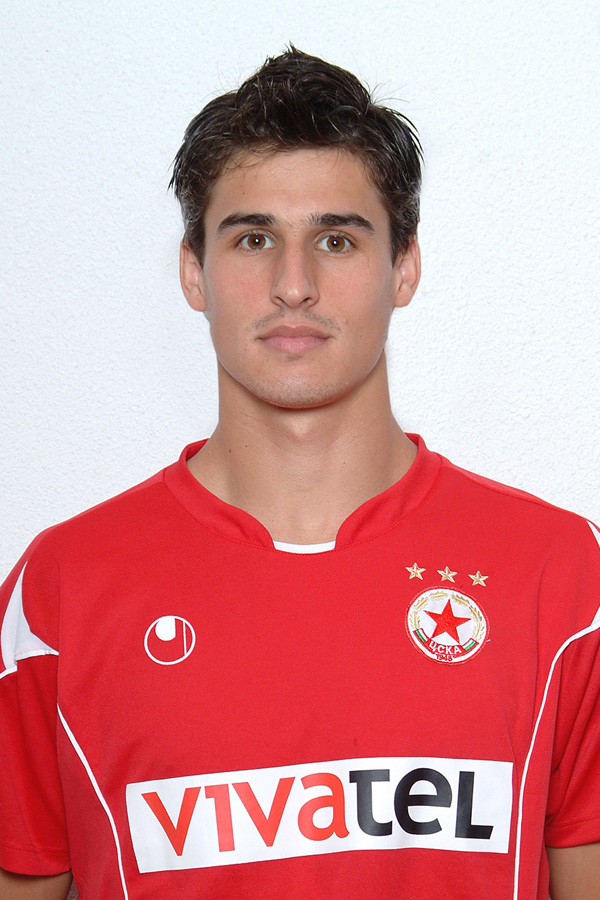
- Machado with CSKA Sofia in 2007

Personal information
- Full name: Filipe José Machado
- Date of birth: 13 March 1984
- Place of birth: Gravataí, Brazil
- Date of death: 28 November 2016 (aged 32)
- Place of death: La Unión, Colombia
- Height: 1.87 m (6 ft 2 in)
- Position: Centre back

Youth career
- Internacional

Senior career*
Years	Team	Apps	(Gls)
2004–2006	Internacional	0	(0)
2004	→ Fluminense (loan)	1	(0)
2005	→ Esportivo (loan)	5	(0)
2006–2007	Pontevedra	35	(0)
2007–2009	CSKA Sofia	38	(2)
2009–2010	Salernitana	6	(1)
2010–2011	Inter Baku	9	(0)
2011	Al Dhafra	3	(0)
2011	Duque de Caxias	11	(0)
2012	Resende	14	(0)
2012	Guaratinguetá	8	(0)
2012–2013	Fujairah	?	(?)
2014–2015	Macaé	63	(2)
2015–2016	Saba Qom	28	(0)
2016	Chapecoense	16	(1)
Total		237	(6)
- * Club domestic league appearances and goals

Filipe José Machado (13 March 1984 – 28 November 2016) was a Brazilian footballer who last played for Chapecoense as a central defender.

Machado was one of the victims when LaMia Airlines Flight 2933 crashed on 28 November 2016.

== Club career ==
Born in Gravataí, Rio Grande do Sul, Machado represented Internacional as a youth but made his senior debut while on loan at Fluminense. He also played the first half of the 2005 season for Esportivo, again on loan.

On 8 August 2006, Machado left for Spanish club Pontevedra CF in Segunda División B. He was an undisputed starter as his club finished first in its group, but failed to achieve promotion in the play-offs.

In the summer of 2007, Machado joined Portuguese club U.D. Leiria, but after altercations with the club's manager, he left for Bulgarian club CSKA Sofia. Machado appeared in 37 matches for the club, contributing with 2 goals. He also scored the winning goal for CSKA Sofia against Levski Sofia in the Eternal Derby during their first meeting of the 2007–08 A PFG season. He stayed there until August 2009, contributing to the club's record 31st league title.

As a free agent, and following a trial period, Machado signed a 1+2-year contract with Serie B side Salernitana in August 2009. He was released in January 2010, and claiming to have unpaid wages.

Machado switched teams and countries again ahead of the 2010–11 campaign, joining Azerbaijani club FC Inter Baku. In February 2011 he moved to the United Arab Emirates for Al Dhafra SCC, but appeared rarely.

Machado returned to Brazil in the 2011 summer, joining Duque de Caxias. He subsequently represented Resende and Guaratinguetá before moving abroad again to join Al-Fujairah SC in September 2012.

On 2 January 2014, Machado joined Macaé Esporte, helping the club in its Campeonato Brasileiro Série C winning campaign.

In the summer of 2015, he joined Persian Gulf Pro League side Saba Qom. On 10 May of the following year he returned to his homeland, signing for Chapecoense.

Machado became a first-choice upon arriving at Chape, and scored his first goal on 6 October 2016 in a 1–3 away loss against Atlético Paranaense. In his last match on 27 November, he was handed the captain armband in a 0–1 away loss against Palmeiras.

== Death ==
Machado was one of 71 fatalities on 28 November 2016, when Chapecoense were en route to the first leg of the 2016 Copa Sudamericana Finals to play against Atlético Nacional in Medellín. Shortly before the take off, he recorded a video to his official Instagram account, showing all the players and the staff inside the plane.

Following the tragic accident, Machado's former club CSKA Sofia announced that part of the ticket revenue from their upcoming Bulgarian First League fixture against Pirin Blagoevgrad would be donated to Machado's family. CSKA Sofia supporters also gathered to pay tribute to Machado and his Chapecoense teammates in front of the Brazilian embassy in Sofia, Bulgaria.

== Career statistics ==
As of 27 November 2016

Club	Season	League			State League		Cup		Continental		Other		Total	
Club	Season	Division	Apps	Goals	Apps	Goals	Apps	Goals	Apps	Goals	Apps	Goals	Apps	Goals
Fluminense	2004	Série A	1	0	0	0	0	0	—		—		1	0
Esportivo	2005	Gaúcho	—		5	0	2	0	—		10 (Note: Appearance(s) in Copa FGF)	0	17	0
Pontevedra	2006–07	Segunda División B	35	0	—		1	0	—		—		36	0
CSKA Sofia	2007–08	A PFG	15	2	—		0	0	0	0	—		15	2
CSKA Sofia	2008–09	A PFG	23	0	—		3	0	—		1 (Note: Appearance(s) in Bulgarian Supercup)	0	27	0
CSKA Sofia	Subtotal		38	2	—		3	0	0	0	1	0	42	2
Salernitana	2009–10	Serie B	6	1	—		0	0	—		—		6	1
Inter Baku	2009–10	Azerbaijan Premier League	2	0	—		1	0	0	0	—		3	0
Inter Baku	2010–11	Azerbaijan Premier League	7	0	—		1	0	0	0	—		8	0
Inter Baku	Subtotal		9	0	—		2	0	0	0	—		11	0
Al Dhafra	2010–11	UAE Pro-League	3	0	—		0	0	—		—		3	0
Duque de Caxias	2011	Série B	11	0	—		—		—		—		11	0
Resende	2012	Carioca	—		14	0	—		—		—		14	0
Guaratinguetá	2012	Série B	8	0	—		—		—		—		8	0
Macaé	2014	Série C	23	1	14	1	—		—		—		37	2
Macaé	2015	Série B	12	0	14	0	—		—		—		26	0
Macaé	Subtotal		35	1	28	1	—		—		—		63	2
Saba Qom	2015–16	Iran Pro League	28	0	—		—		—		—		28	0
Chapecoense	2016	Série A	16	1	—		0	0	3 (Note: Appearance(s) in Copa Sudamericana)	0	—		19	1
Career total			190	5	47	1	8	0	3	0	11	0	259	6

== Honours ==
CSKA Sofia

- Bulgarian A Football Group: 2007–08
- Bulgarian Supercup: 2008

Inter Baku

- Azerbaijan Premier League: 2009–10

Macaé

- Campeonato Brasileiro Série C: 2014

Chapecoense

- Copa Sudamericana: 2016 (posthumously)
