= Veselin Stoykov =

Bulgarian footballer

Personal information
- Full name: Veselin Aleksandrov Stoykov
- Date of birth: 27 August 1986 (age 40)
- Place of birth: Blagoevgrad, Bulgaria
- Height: 1.81 m (5 ft 11 1/2 in)
- Position: Striker

Team information
- Current team: Strumska Slava

Senior career*
Years	Team	Apps	(Gls)
2006–2011	Pirin Blagoevgrad	63	(15)
2009–2010	→ Bansko (loan)	29	(13)
2011	Vidima-Rakovski	14	(2)
2012	Caspiy		(4)
2013	Bansko	7	(1)
2013–2014	Pirin Blagoevgrad	19	(3)
2014–2015	Mesta 2005	23	(2)
2015	Septemvri Simitli	2	(0)
2016–	Strumska Slava	0	(0)
- * Club domestic league appearances and goals as of 19 January 2016

Veselin Stoykov (Bulgarian: Веселин Стойков; born 27 August 1986) is a Bulgarian footballer, who plays as a striker for Strumska Slava.

== Club statistics ==
As of 1 August 2011

Club	Season	League		Cup		Total	
Club	Season	Apps	Goals	Apps	Goals	Apps	Goals
Pirin	2006–07	23	13	3	0	26	13
Pirin	2007-08	11	0	3	0	14	0
Pirin	2008-09	7	0	2	0	9	0
Bansko	2009-10	29	11	1	0	30	11
Pirin	2010-11	22	2	3	0	25	2
Vidima-Rakovski	2011-12	14	2	0	0	14	2
Career totals		106	28	12	0	118	28
