= Nikolay Chavdarov =

Bulgarian footballer

Personal information
- Full name: Nikolay Metodiev Chavdarov
- Date of birth: 22 April 1976 (age 50)
- Place of birth: Sofia, Bulgaria
- Height: 1.84 m (6 ft 1/2 in)
- Position: Goalkeeper

Senior career*
Years	Team	Apps	(Gls)
1995–1999	Metalurg Pernik	115	(0)
2000–2003	Rilski Sportist	53	(0)
2003–2007	Marek Dupnitsa	60	(0)
2007–2009	Pirin Blagoevgrad	30	(0)
2009	Rilski Sportist	9	(0)
2010–2011	Akademik Sofia	3	(0)
2011–2012	Rilski Sportist	26	(0)
Total		296	(0)

Managerial career
- 2009–2010: Rilski Sportist Samokov (goalkeeping coach)
- 2010–2011: Akademik Sofia (goalkeeping coach)
- 2011–2020: Slavia Sofia U17 (goalkeeping coach)
- 2020–2025: Bulgaria U21 (goalkeeping coach)
- 2025–2026: Bulgaria (goalkeeping coach)
- * Club domestic league appearances and goals

Nikolay Chavdarov (Bulgarian: Николай Чавдаров; born 22 April 1976) is a Bulgarian former professional footballer who played as a goalkeeper.
