= Todor Yanchev =

Bulgarian footballer and manager

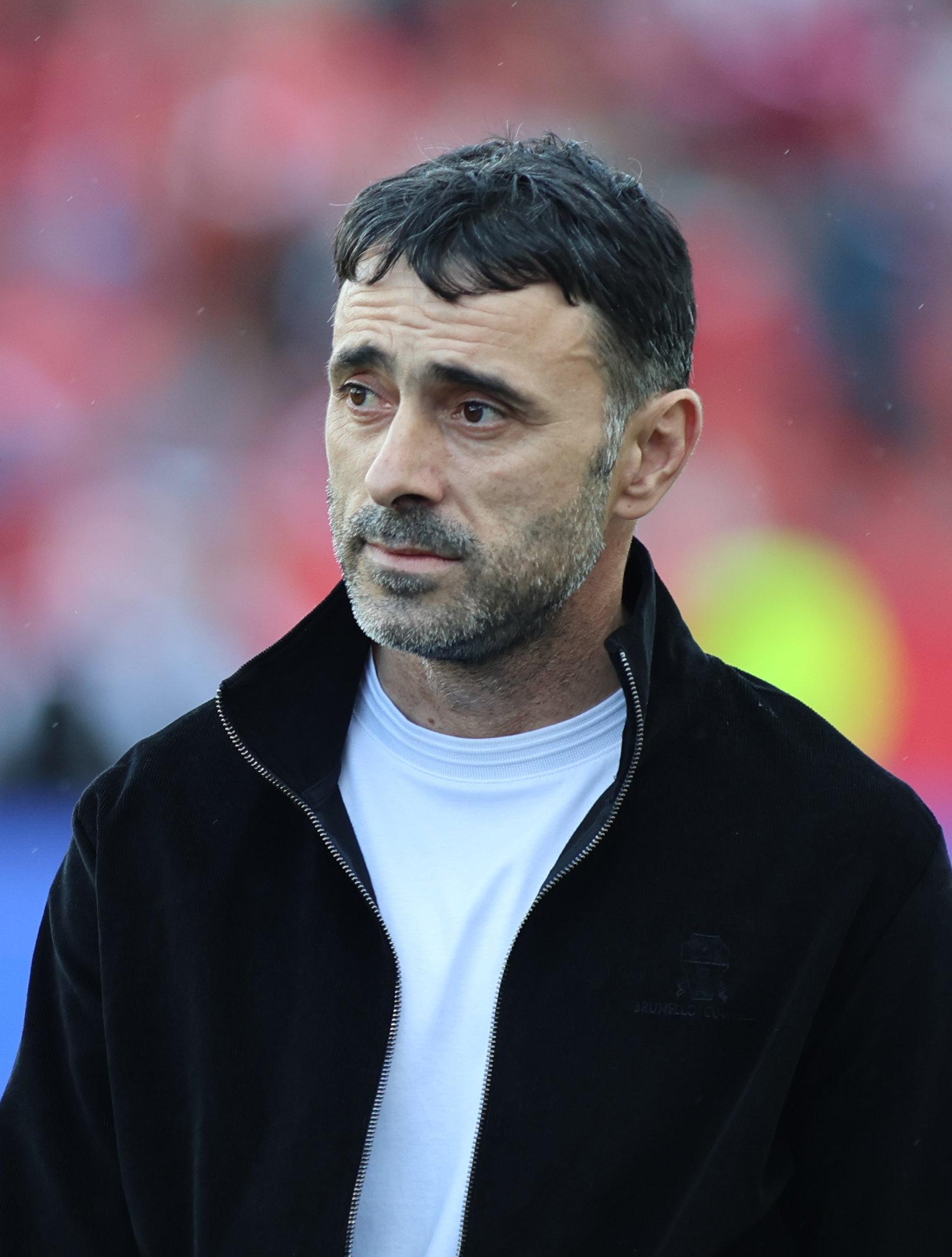

Personal information
- Full name: Todor Dimitrov Yanchev
- Date of birth: 19 May 1976 (age 50)
- Place of birth: Kazanlak, Bulgaria
- Height: 1.78 m (5 ft 10 in)
- Positions: Centre midfielder; defensive midfielder

Team information
- Current team: Bulgaria 21 (manager)

Youth career
- Rozova Dolina

Senior career*
Years	Team	Apps	(Gls)
1997–2000	Neftochimic Burgas	88	(13)
2000–2005	CSKA Sofia	116	(7)
2001	→ Trabzonspor (loan)	21	(0)
2005–2006	Kallithea	20	(1)
2006–2007	Randers	30	(3)
2007–2013	CSKA Sofia	145	(12)
2013	Slavia Sofia	17	(1)
2013–2014	CSKA Sofia	27	(1)
Total		464	(38)

International career
1999–2008	Bulgaria	17	(0)

Managerial career
- 2012–2013: CSKA Sofia (assistant)
- 2014–2015: CSKA Sofia (assistant)
- 2015: Tsarsko Selo
- 2016: Sofia 2010
- 2016: Tsarsko Selo Sofia
- 2017–2020: Kaisar (assistant)
- 2021–2022: CSKA Sofia (assistant)
- 2022: Sportist Svoge
- 2022–2023: CSKA 1948
- 2024: Botev Vratsa
- 2025–: Bulgaria U21
- * Club domestic league appearances and goals

Todor Dimitrov Yanchev (Bulgarian: Тодор Димитров Янчев; born 19 May 1976) is a Bulgarian football manager and former player. He played as a midfielder.

== Playing career ==
Born in Kazanlak, Yanchev's first club was local club Rozova Dolina, before he moved to the squads of Naftex Burgas. While in the fifth grade, he sustained a serious injury that almost put an end to his professional career before it had even started.

In the summer break of 2000 CSKA Sofia signed Yanchev. With CSKA he became a champion of Bulgaria for 2003 and 2005. After the end of 2004–05 season, Yanchev transferred to Greek side Kallithea. Year later, as a free agent he signed with Randers, spending one season in Danish Superliga.

In 2007, Todor returned to Bulgaria, to join CSKA Sofia for the second time. In 2008, he became a champion of Bulgaria for third time and won Bulgarian Supercup. In the summer of 2009 he, as well as Kiril Kotev and Yordan Todorov, stayed in the club although the club was facing a big financial crisis, showing very stable level of play proving why he has been the team captain. In 2012 Yanchev was suspended for 3 months after he failed a drug test for methylhexanamine doping.

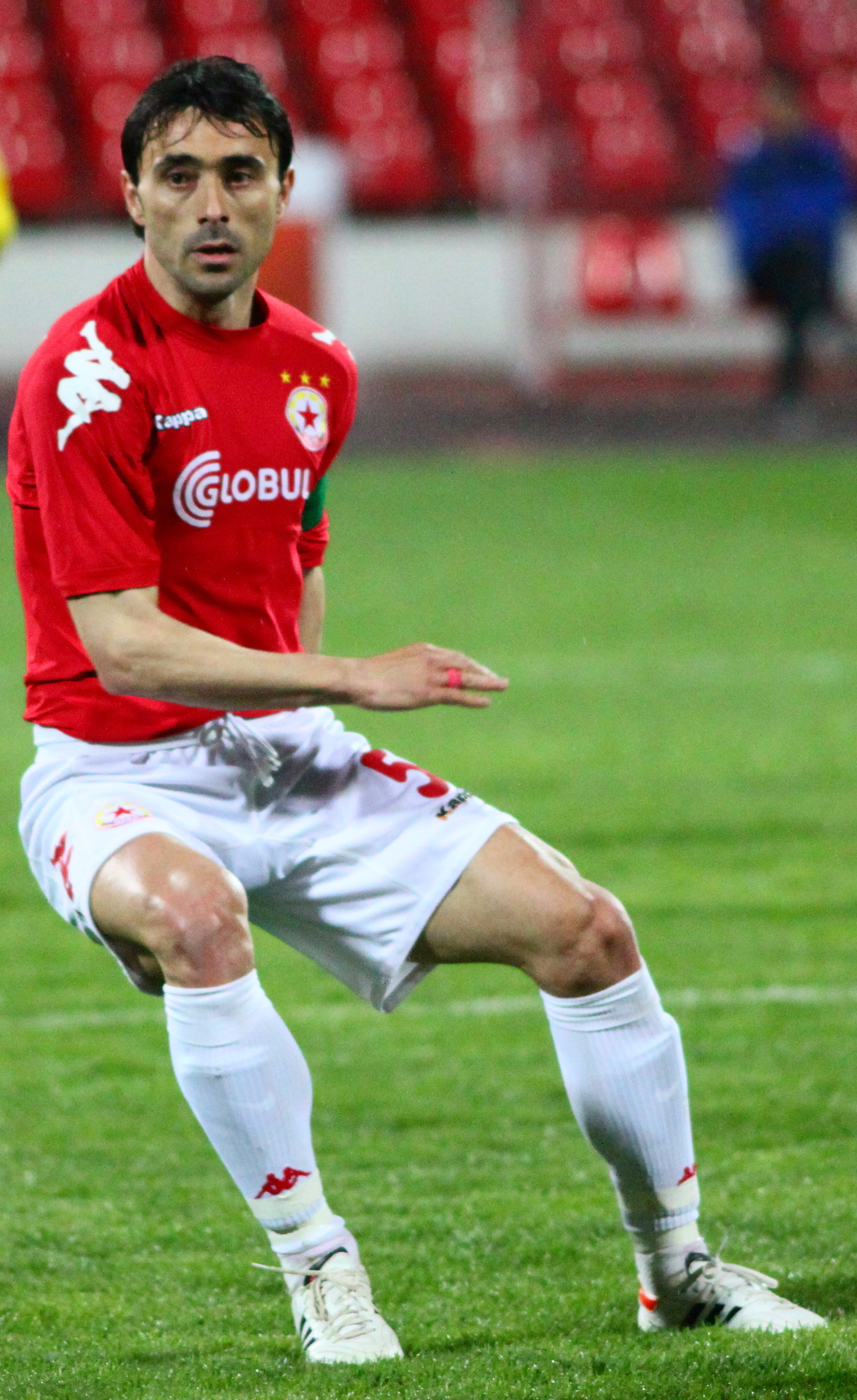
Yanchev in 2010

The defensive midfielder, was one of eight players who was fired by CSKA Sofia on 27 July 2012 and he was appointed for assistant coach, but on 6 August 2012 he was brought back in the first team, because of problem with the registering of the new players. On 20 October 2012, he played for 22nd time in the Eternal derby, wherein CSKA won 1–0.

On 7 January 2013, after leading the team of CSKA to the first official winter training session, Toshko gave his resignation to the Bulgarian Football Union and is no longer a player for CSKA. He decided to leave CSKA Sofia as a show of support for manager Stoycho Mladenov who had been sacked.

On 21 January, it was announced that Yanchev would join Slavia Sofia on a free transfer.

In July of the same year he returned to CSKA Sofia for the third time, after the club changed its ownership.

== Managerial career ==
Yanchev was also assistant manager of CSKA Sofia when he played for the team in 2012–13 season and later in 2014–15 season. After he retired in the summer of 2015, he became manager of the newly founded team Tsarsko Selo in the A Regional Group. The team had only wins and one draw in the league, but in the end of December 2015 Tsarsko Selo's owner Stoyne Manolov bought V Group team FC Sofia and from 1 January 2016 Yanchev was appointed as manager in order to save the team from relegation and is looking to manage team in professional football. On 29 October 2016, following two successive defeats, Yanchev resigned.

== Manager statistics ==
As of 22 September 2016

Team	From	To	Record							
Team	From	To	G	W	D	L	Win %	GF	GA	GD
Tsarsko Selo	1 July 2015	28 December 2015	13	12	1	0	92.31	62	4	+58
Sofia 2010	1 January 2016	31 June 2016	16	9	1	6	56.25	38	22	+16
Tsarsko Selo Sofia	1 August 2016		7	2	2	3	28.57	6	9	-3
Total			36	23	4	9	63.89	106	30	+71

== Honours ==
CSKA Sofia

- Bulgarian A PFG (3)

- 2002–03, 2004–05, 2007–08

- Bulgarian Cup (1)

- 2010–11

- Bulgarian Supercup (2)

- 2008, 2011
