= Strati Iliev =

Bulgarian footballer

Personal information
- Full name: Strati Iliev
- Date of birth: 15 October 1973 (age 53)
- Place of birth: Burgas, Bulgaria
- Height: 1.82 m (6 ft 0 in)
- Position: Midfielder

Senior career*
Years	Team	Apps	(Gls)
1994–1999	Nesebar	?	(?)
1999	Tampere	9	(7)
2000	Jokerit	4	(0)
2000–2001	Jazz	45	(5)
2002–2007	Nesebar	84	(11)
2007–2008	Loko Stara Zagora	16	(3)
2008–2010	Loko Mezdra	40	(3)
2010	Ravda	5	(1)
2011	Botev Kozloduy		
2012	Għargħur F.C.		
- * Club domestic league appearances and goals as of 1 January 2008 ‡ National team caps and goals as of 1 January 2008

Strati Iliev (Bulgarian: Страти Илиев; born 15 October 1973) is a Bulgarian footballer currently playing for Botev Kozloduy as a midfielder. Strati is a defensive midfielder.

He had previously played for PFC Nesebar, PFC Lokomotiv Stara Zagora and Finnish clubs Tampere United, FC Jokerit and FC Jazz.
