= Marquinhos (footballer, born April 1982) =

Bulgarian footballer

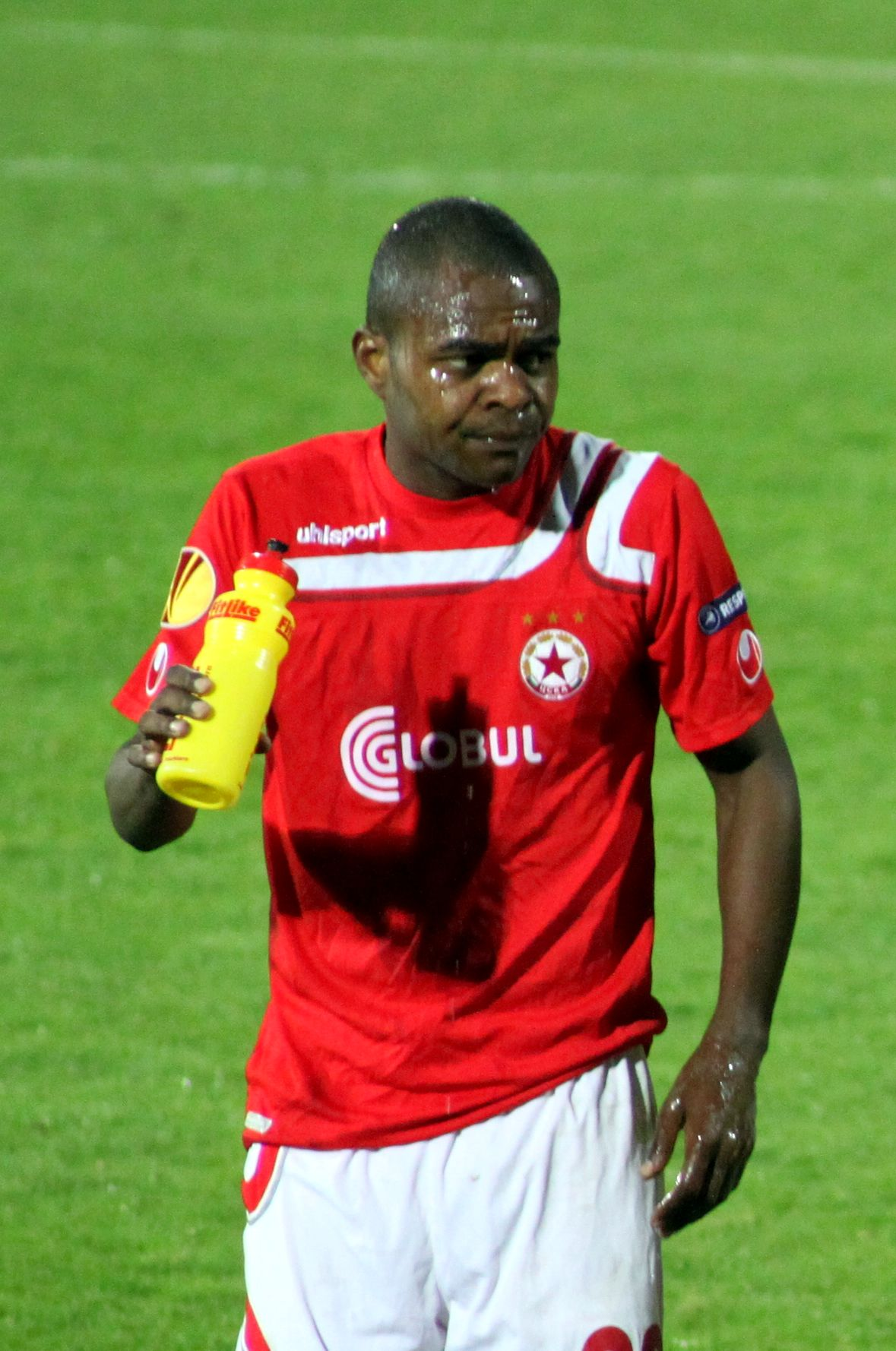
- Marquinhos with CSKA Sofia in 2010

Personal information
- Full name: Marcos Antônio Malachias Junior
- Date of birth: 30 April 1982 (age 44)
- Place of birth: Campinas, Brazil
- Height: 1.84 m (6 ft 0 in)
- Position: Midfielder

Youth career
- Guaçuano

Senior career*
Years	Team	Apps	(Gls)
2004–2006	Guaçuano		
2006–2007	Belasitsa Petrich	41	(17)
2007–2011	CSKA Sofia	91	(16)
2011–2012	Anorthosis Famagusta	27	(3)
2012	Changchun Yatai	12	(3)
2013–2014	Lokomotiv Sofia	42	(17)
2014–2015	CSKA Sofia	24	(3)
2015–2016	Pirin Blagoevgrad	31	(2)
2016	Montana	15	(1)
2017	FC Cascavel	5	(2)
2018	Caldense	6	(0)
Total		294	(64)

International career
2011–2014	Bulgaria	6	(0)
- * Club domestic league appearances and goals

Marcos Antônio Malachias Júnior (Bulgarian: Маркос Антонио Малашиас Жуниор; born 30 April 1982), commonly known as Marquinhos, is a retired professional footballer who played as a midfielder. Born in Brazil, he represented the Bulgaria national team.

== Club career ==
Born in Campinas, Marquinhos started his career at Guaçuano in 2004. In February 2006 he signed with Bulgarian club Belasitsa Petrich from Guaçuano. He made his debut for the club on 4 March 2006 in an A PFG match against Naftex Burgas. Marquinhos made 13 league appearances to the end of the season, scoring five goals, helping the club avoid relegation. In the following 2006–07 season he finished the league campaign with 12 goals in 28 appearances.

On 28 May 2007, Marquinhos moved to CSKA Sofia. The deal was reported to be worth around €150,000. Marquinhos's competitive debut for the club came in CSKA's opening match at away to Litex Lovech on 11 August. On 8 March 2008, Marquinhos scored his first CSKA goal in a 3–1 away win over his previously club Belasitsa.

He scored the equalizing goal in the 1–1 away draw against Derry City on 6 August 2009 to enable his team to progress to the next stage of the UEFA Europa League. He suffered an injury in December 2009, which took him out of play for a couple of months.

On 4 November 2010, Marquinhos scored the winning goal against Rapid Wien in a 2–1 away victory of Europa League group stage. On 25 May 2011, he assisted Spas Delev in a 1–0 win over Slavia Sofia in the final of Bulgarian Cup.

Marquinhos announced retirement on 16 December 2016 after leaving Montana and would start studying in NSA and focus on manager career.

However, in March 2017 he joined the amateur Brazilian club Cascavel. On 9 January 2018, Marquinhos returned again from retirement to play for the Brazilian club Caldense in Campeonato Mineiro.

== International career ==
On 27 May 2011, Marquinhos was named to the Bulgaria national team's squad for the friendly match against Corsica and Euro 2012 qualifier against Montenegro, just days after receiving citizenship from his adopted country. He made his debut four days later, appearing as a substitute for the second half. His official debut came on 4 June against Montenegro; Marquinhos was booked in the 54th minute and the match was drawn 1–1.

== Career statistics ==
=== Club ===
As of 15 December 2016

Appearances and goals by club, season and competition
Club	Season	League			Cup		Continental		Total	
Club	Season	Division	Apps	Goals	Apps	Goals	Apps	Goals	Apps	Goals
Belasitsa Petrich	2005–06	A Group	13	5	0	0	–		13	5
Belasitsa Petrich	2006–07	A Group	28	12	1	0	–		29	12
Belasitsa Petrich	Total		41	17	1	0	0	0	42	17
CSKA Sofia	2007–08	A Group	25	1	1	0	3	0	29	1
CSKA Sofia	2008–09	A Group	25	2	3	3	–		28	5
CSKA Sofia	2009–10	A Group	13	4	0	0	7	1	20	5
CSKA Sofia	2010–11	A Group	28	9	5	1	10	3	43	13
CSKA Sofia	Total		91	16	9	4	20	4	120	24
Anorthosis Famagusta	2011–12	Cypriot First Division	27	3	4	0	1	0	32	3
Changchun Yatai	2012	Chinese Super League	12	3	0	0	–		12	3
Lokomotiv Sofia	2012–13	A Group	8	1	2	0	–		10	1
Lokomotiv Sofia	2013–14	A Group	34	16	6	1	–		40	17
Lokomotiv Sofia	Total		42	17	8	1	0	0	50	18
CSKA Sofia	2014–15	A Group	24	3	1	0	2	0	27	3
Pirin Blagoevgrad	2015–16	A Group	31	2	1	0	–		32	2
Montana	2016	First Professional League	15	1	1	0	–		16	1
Career totals			283	62	25	5	23	4	331	71

=== International ===
Appearances and goals by national team and year
National team	Year	Apps	Goals
Bulgaria	2011	3	0
Bulgaria	2012	1	0
Bulgaria	2013	1	0
Bulgaria	2014	1	0
Total		6	0

== Honours ==
CSKA Sofia

- A PFG: 2007–08
- Bulgarian Cup: 2010–11
- Bulgarian Supercup: 2008
