= Abudramae Bamba =

Ivorian footballer

Aboudramane Bamba
Personal information
- Full name: Abudramae Bamba
- Date of birth: October 26, 1987 (age 38)
- Place of birth: Abidjan, Ivory Coast
- Height: 1.86 m (6 ft 1 in)
- Position: Striker

Youth career
- Jeunesse Club

Senior career*
Years	Team	Apps	(Gls)
2004–2008	Jeunesse Club	?	(?)
2006	→ Tallinna Jalgpalliklubi (loan)	24	(3)
2008	Chernomorets Burgas	3	(0)
2009–2010	Lokomotiv Mezdra	22	(8)
2011–2013	Muscat FC	?	(?)
- * Club domestic league appearances and goals as of 21:25, July 2010 (UTC)

Abudramae Bamba (born 26 October 1987 in Abidjan) is an Ivorian footballer. He plays in the centre forward position.

== Career ==
After spending the first six years of his career in his home country with Jeunesse Club d'Abidjan, Bamba relocated to Bulgaria in September 2008, signing a two-year contract with Chernomorets Burgas. On 13 November 2008, he scored his first goal in Bulgaria in a match against Rodopa Smolyan of Bulgarian Cup.

=== Lokomotiv Mezdra ===
In January 2009, Bamba signed a contract with Lokomotiv Mezdra. On March 23, 2009, in a match against Pirin, he made his official debut for the club. In this match, he also scored his first goal for Lokomotiv. On 23 May, Bamba scored three goals against Belasitsa. Thereby, Bamba became the second African player, after Isaac Kwakye, who scored hattrick in a match from Bulgarian top division.
