= Pavel Kovachev =

Bulgarian footballer

Personal information
- Full name: Pavel Blagomirov Kovachev
- Date of birth: 27 July 1987 (age 39)
- Place of birth: Stara Zagora, Bulgaria
- Height: 1.91 m (6 ft 3 in)
- Position: Centre back

Youth career
- Beroe Stara Zagora

Senior career*
Years	Team	Apps	(Gls)
2005–2007	Beroe Stara Zagora	14	(0)
2007–2009	Kaunas	42	(3)
2009	CSKA Sofia	1	(0)
2009–2011	Beroe Stara Zagora	16	(0)
2011–2012	Kaliakra Kavarna	21	(0)
2012–2013	Lokomotiv Plovdiv	14	(1)
- * Club domestic league appearances and goals as of 28 May 2013

Pavel Kovachev (Bulgarian: Павел Ковачев; born 27 July 1987 in Stara Zagora) is a Bulgarian footballer who plays for Lokomotiv Plovdiv as a defender.

== Career ==
Kovachev started his career in his hometown in the youth teams of Beroe Stara Zagora. In 2007, he was sold to the Lithuanian side FBK Kaunas.

After a year there, he returned to Bulgaria after he caught the eye of the CSKA Sofia scouts and signed with "The Armymen". He made his debut with CSKA in the last game of the 2008–09 season in the Bulgarian "A" Professional Football Group, which was a match against Lokomotiv Mezdra. CSKA Sofia won the game by a score of 2:1.

In June 2009 Kovachev returned to his first club, signing a contract for two years.

== Honours ==
=== Club ===
- Beroe
  - Bulgarian Cup:
    - Winner: 2009-10
