= Stefan Kikov =

Bulgarian footballer

Personal information
- Full name: Stefan Yosifov Kikov
- Date of birth: 2 April 1982 (age 44)
- Place of birth: Plovdiv, Bulgaria
- Height: 1.80 m (5 ft 11 in)
- Positions: Centre back; defensive midfielder

Team information
- Current team: Rakovski
- Number: 10

Youth career
- Botev Plovdiv

Senior career*
Years	Team	Apps	(Gls)
2000–2004	Botev Plovdiv	10	(1)
2004–2005	Cherno More	1	(0)
2005–2007	Shumen	55	(16)
2007–2010	Sliven 2000	76	(11)
2010	Slavia Sofia	3	(0)
2011	Brestnik 1948	6	(0)
2011–2012	Botev Plovdiv	5	(1)
2012	Lyubimets 2007	4	(0)
2013	Svetkavitsa	7	(0)
2013–2014	Doxa Drama	13	(0)
2014–2017	Rakovski	63	(2)
- * Club domestic league appearances and goals as of 8 December 2014

Stefan Kikov (Bulgarian: Стефан Киков) (born 2 April 1982 in Plovdiv) is a Bulgarian footballer currently playing for Rakovski. Kikov usually plays as central defender or central midfielder.
