= Nikolay Chipev =

Bulgarian footballer

Personal information
- Full name: Nikolay Stamenov Chipev
- Date of birth: 20 February 1989 (age 37)
- Place of birth: Sofia, Bulgaria
- Height: 1.78 m (5 ft 10 in)
- Position: Midfielder

Youth career
- CSKA Sofia

Senior career*
Years	Team	Apps	(Gls)
2007–2009	CSKA Sofia	21	(0)
2008	→ Beroe (loan)	15	(2)
2009	→ Sportist Svoge (loan)	3	(0)
2010	Lokomotiv Plovdiv	12	(1)
2011	Hamrun Spartans	9	(1)
2011	Montana	10	(0)
2012	Vidima-Rakovski	11	(0)
2012	Slavia Sofia	4	(0)
2013	Svetkavitsa	7	(2)
2013	Neftochimic 1986	11	(3)
2014	Beroe Stara Zagora	6	(0)
2014	Spartak Varna	10	(3)
2015	Dinamo Samarqand	13	(2)
2015	Buxoro	14	(0)
2016	Montana	9	(0)

International career
2006–2008	Bulgaria U19		
2008–2009	Bulgaria U21	8	(1)
- * Club domestic league appearances and goals as of 9 November 2016

Nikolay Stamenov Chipev (Bulgarian: Николай Чипев; born 20 February 1989) is a Bulgarian former professional footballer who played as a midfielder.

== Career ==
He was raised in CSKA Sofia's youth teams. In 2015, he signed a contract with FK Dinamo Samarqand to play in the Uzbek top division. Chipev made his official debut for Dinamo on 14 March in League home match against Kokand 1912. He scored his first goal for new club on 20 March 2015 in away match against FK Buxoro, scoring in the 29th minute. He was sent off on 19 June 2015, in the 0:2 away loss against Nasaf Qarshi. On 8 November 2016, Chipev was released by Montana.

== Honours ==
CSKA Sofia

- Bulgarian Supercup: 2008
