= Vladislav Zlatinov =

Bulgarian footballer

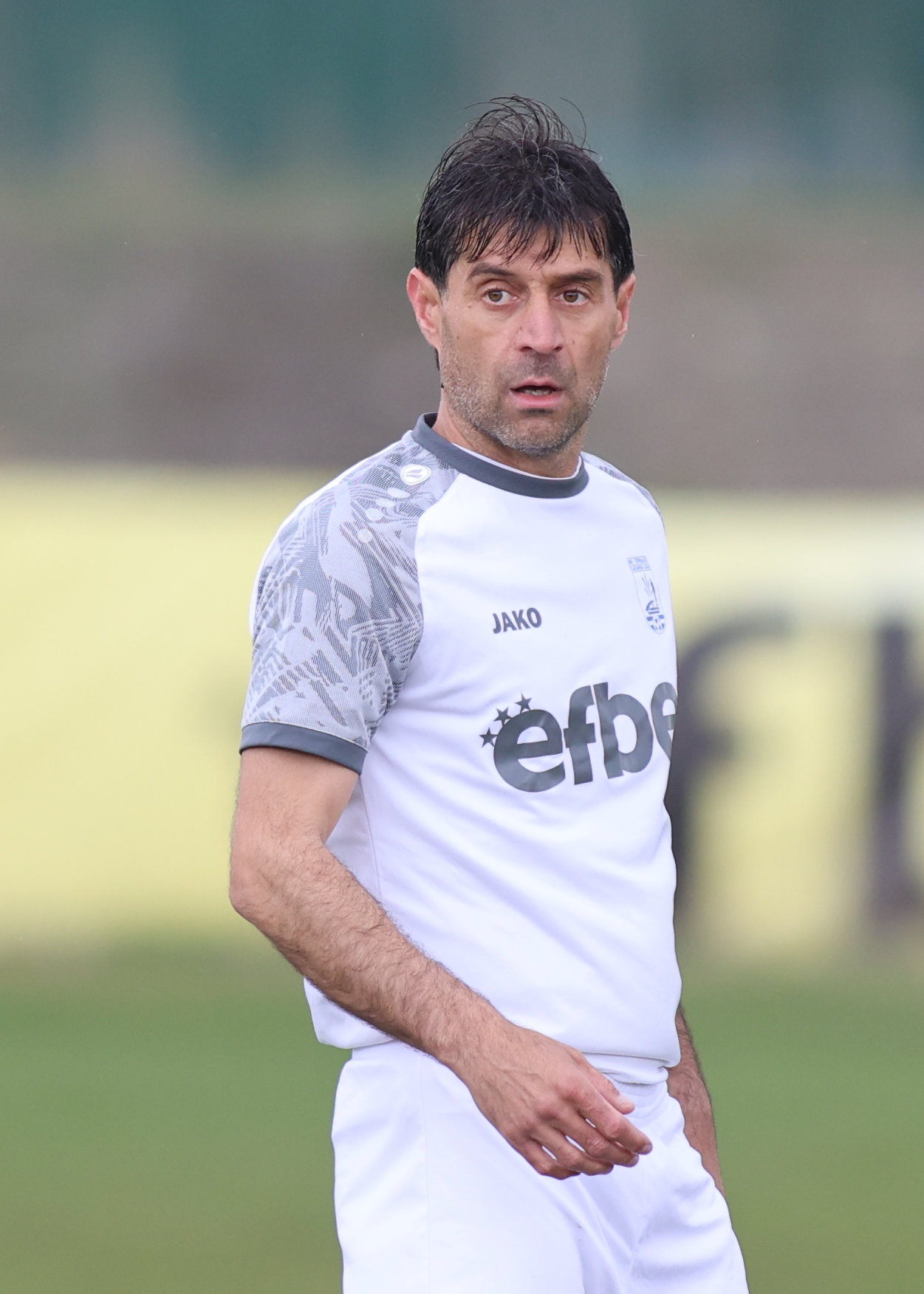
- Zlatinov playing for Germaneya in 2026

Personal information
- Full name: Vladislav Hristov Zlatinov
- Date of birth: 23 March 1983 (age 43)
- Place of birth: Sandanski, Bulgaria
- Height: 1.82 m (6 ft 0 in)
- Position: Forward

Team information
- Current team: FC Germanea Sapareva Banya
- Number: 24

Youth career
- Vihren
- CSKA Sofia

Senior career*
Years	Team	Apps	(Gls)
2002–2003	Vihren	19	(7)
2003–2005	Pirin Blagoevgrad	53	(35)
2005–2008	Lokomotiv Plovdiv	58	(10)
2008	→ Beroe (loan)	15	(5)
2008–2009	CSKA Sofia	6	(1)
2009–2010	Bansko	26	(17)
2010–2011	Beroe	41	(12)
2012	Slavia Sofia	28	(9)
2013	Montana	12	(1)
2013–2015	Pirin Blagoevgrad	51	(35)
2016	Lokomotiv Mezdra	12	(3)
2016	Pirin Blagoevgrad	11	(3)
2017	Bansko	7	(0)
2017	Mylopotamos	?	(?)
2018	Vihren	11	(2)
2018–2021	Pirin Blagoevgrad	49	(18)
2021–	Septemvri Simitli	20	(6)
- * Club domestic league appearances and goals as of 13 April 2022

Vladislav Hristov Zlatinov (Bulgarian: Владислав Христов Златинов; born 23 March 1983) is a Bulgarian footballer who plays as a forward who plays for Bulgarian Third League club FC Germanea Sapareva Banya.

He is a product of CSKA Sofia's youth system and was the Bulgarian Second Division's top scorer for 2004 with 21 goals.

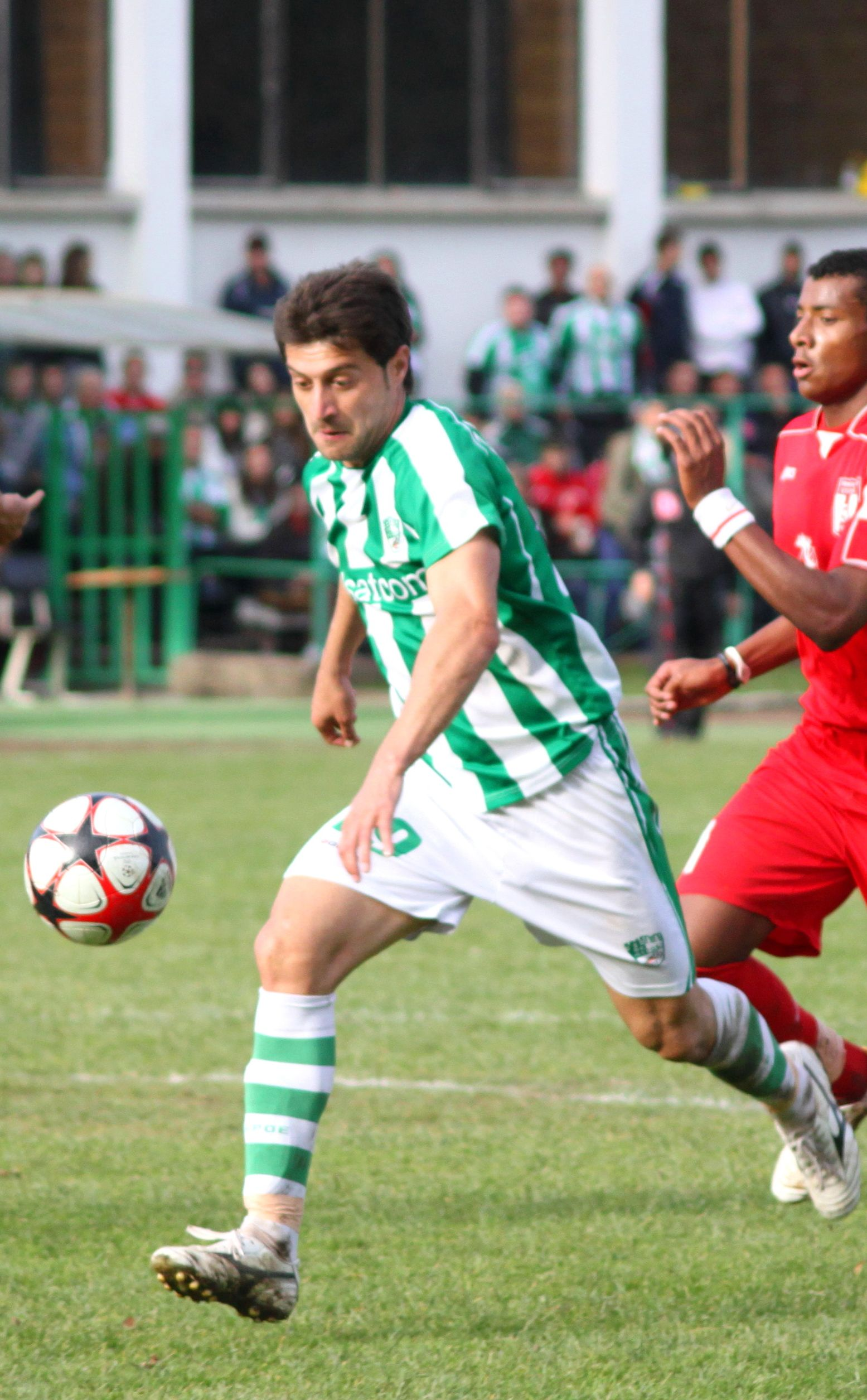
Vladislav Zlatinov in 2010

On 10 March 2017, Zlatinov joined Bansko but left the club at the end of the season. In August 2017, Zlatinov joined Gamma Ethniki side Mylopotamos. In January 2018, Zlatinov returned to his hometown club Vihren.

In June 2018, Zlatinov made another return to Pirin Blagoevgrad where his brother Petar was appointed as manager.

== Honours ==
CSKA Sofia

- Bulgarian Supercup: 2008
