= Milan Milutinović (footballer) =

Serbian footballer

Personal information
- Date of birth: April 20, 1983 (age 43)
- Place of birth: Šabac, SR Serbia, SFR Yugoslavia
- Height: 1.75 m (5 ft 9 in)
- Position: Midfielder

Youth career
- Mačva Šabac

Senior career*
Years	Team	Apps	(Gls)
2002–2005	Mačva Šabac	81	(2)
2005–2008	Vojvodina	56	(2)
2008	Hajduk Kula	1	(0)
2008–2010	Lokomotiv Plovdiv	37	(1)
2010–2011	Leotar	9	(0)
2011–2012	Mačva Šabac	17	(4)
2012–2013	Donji Srem	19	(1)
2013–2014	Mačva Šabac	22	(2)
2014–2015	Radnik Surdulica	4	(0)
2015–2016	Dolný Kubín	7	(0)
- * Club domestic league appearances and goals

Milan Milutinović (Serbian Cyrillic: Милан Милутиновић; born April 20, 1983) is a Serbian retired footballer.

== Career ==
Milutinović signed a 2-year deal with PFC Lokomotiv Plovdiv after being released from FK Vojvodina in 2008.

== Honours ==
Radnik Surdulica

- Serbian First League: 2014–15
