= Eli Marques =

Brazilian footballer (born 1982)

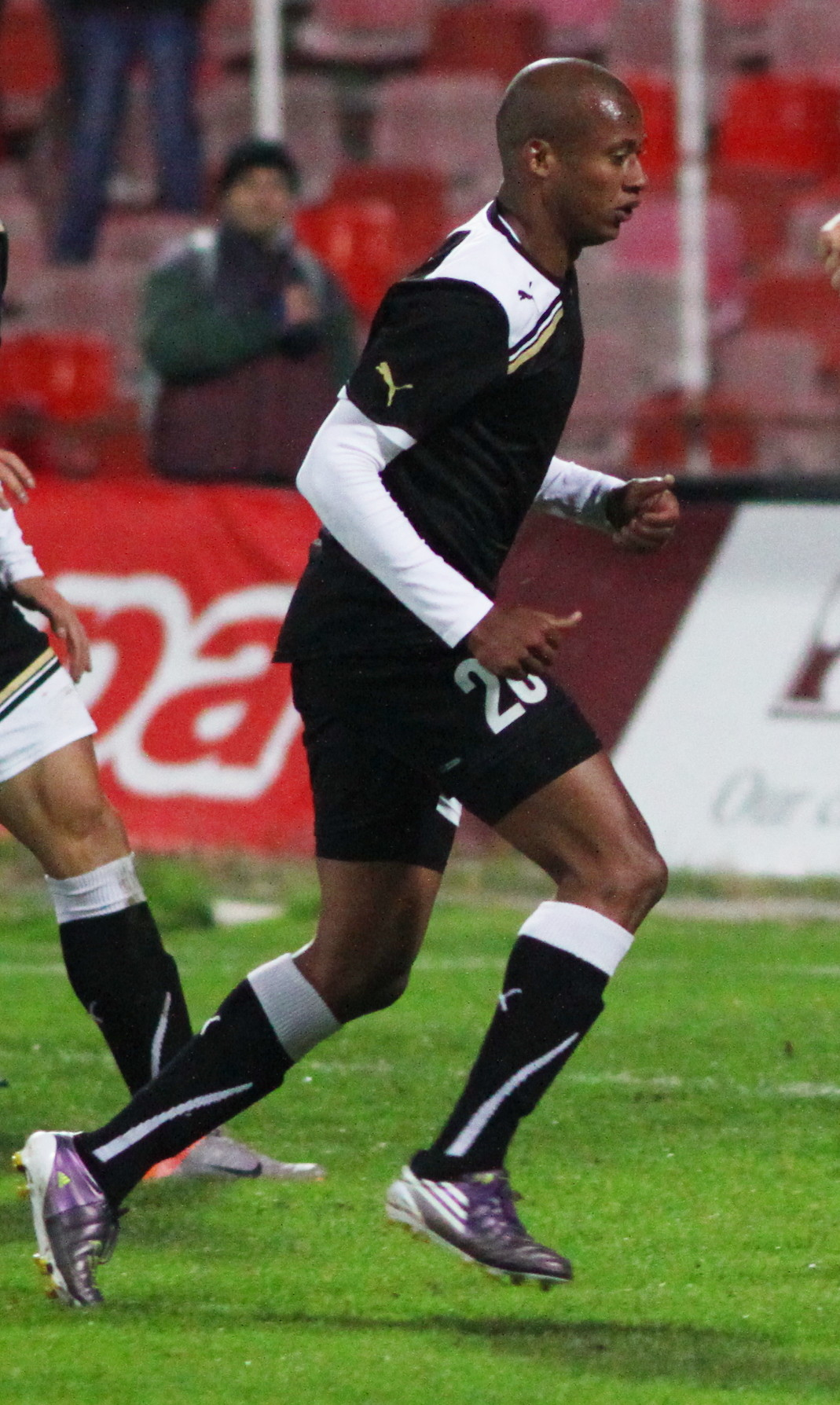

Personal information
- Full name: Elidiano Marques Lima
- Date of birth: March 14, 1982 (age 44)
- Place of birth: Ibirité, Brazil
- Height: 1.80 m (5 ft 11 in)
- Positions: Midfielder; right wing back

Senior career*
Years	Team	Apps	(Gls)
2005–2006	Botafogo SP	?	(?)
2007	Social	?	(?)
2007–2008	Belasitsa Petrich	29	(2)
2008–2009	CSKA Sofia	14	(1)
2009–2010	Cherno More	30	(0)
2011	AEL Limassol	5	(0)
2011	Slavia Sofia	13	(0)
2012	Svetkavitsa	12	(1)
2012	Lokomotiv Plovdiv	0	(0)
2012–2013	Etar 1924	8	(0)
2013–2014	Montana	6	(1)
2014	Pirin Gotse Delchev	14	(1)
2015–2016	Oborishte	53	(7)
2016	Bansko	12	(0)
2017–2018	Oborishte	28	(0)
2018–2019	Pirin Razlog	?	(?)
2020	Belasitsa Petrich	?	(?)
2020	Oborishte	61	(5)
2022	Chernomorets Balchik		
2022	Botev Novi Pazar		

Managerial career
- 2020: Belasitsa Petrich (player-assistant)
- 2020: Oborishte (player-assistant)
- 2021: Bansko
- 2024: Chernomorets Balchik
- 2024: CSKA 1948 U17
- * Club domestic league appearances and goals as of 26 May 2018

Elidiano "Eli" Marques Lima (born 14 March 1982, in Ibirité) is a Brazilian retired football player, who played as a right or left wingback, and now manager.

== Career ==
Having played for Social Futebol Clube in Brazil, in 2007 he resided in Bulgaria and joined Bulgarian side Belasitsa Petrich. After making some very good performances, he was transferred to CSKA Sofia. He scored his first goal for the team after a great long-range shot in an away game against OFC Sliven 2000.

On 29 July 2009, Marques left CSKA Sofia and signed a contract with Cherno More Varna. On 25 November, he scored his first goal for the team against Chernomorets Burgas in a match of the Bulgarian Cup.

On 26 June 2012, Marques joined Lokomotiv Plovdiv. On 11 July, he made his competitive debut for Lokomotiv, coming on as a substitute in the 2012 Supercup match against Ludogorets Razgrad. Marques also played in the two legs of second qualifying round in the Europa League against Vitesse Arnhem. On 6 August 2012, his contract was terminated by mutual consent.

A day later, Eli Marques joined Etar 1924.

On 14 September 2016, Eli Marques joined Bansko but was released in December. In January 2017, he returned to Oborishte.

In July 2018, Marques joined Pirin Razlog. On 29 December 2019, Marques revealed that he would return to Belasitsa Petrich, this time as a player-assistant coach. New owners arrived and on 1 May 2020, Marques was released.
