= Pavel Vidanov =

Bulgarian footballer (born 1988)

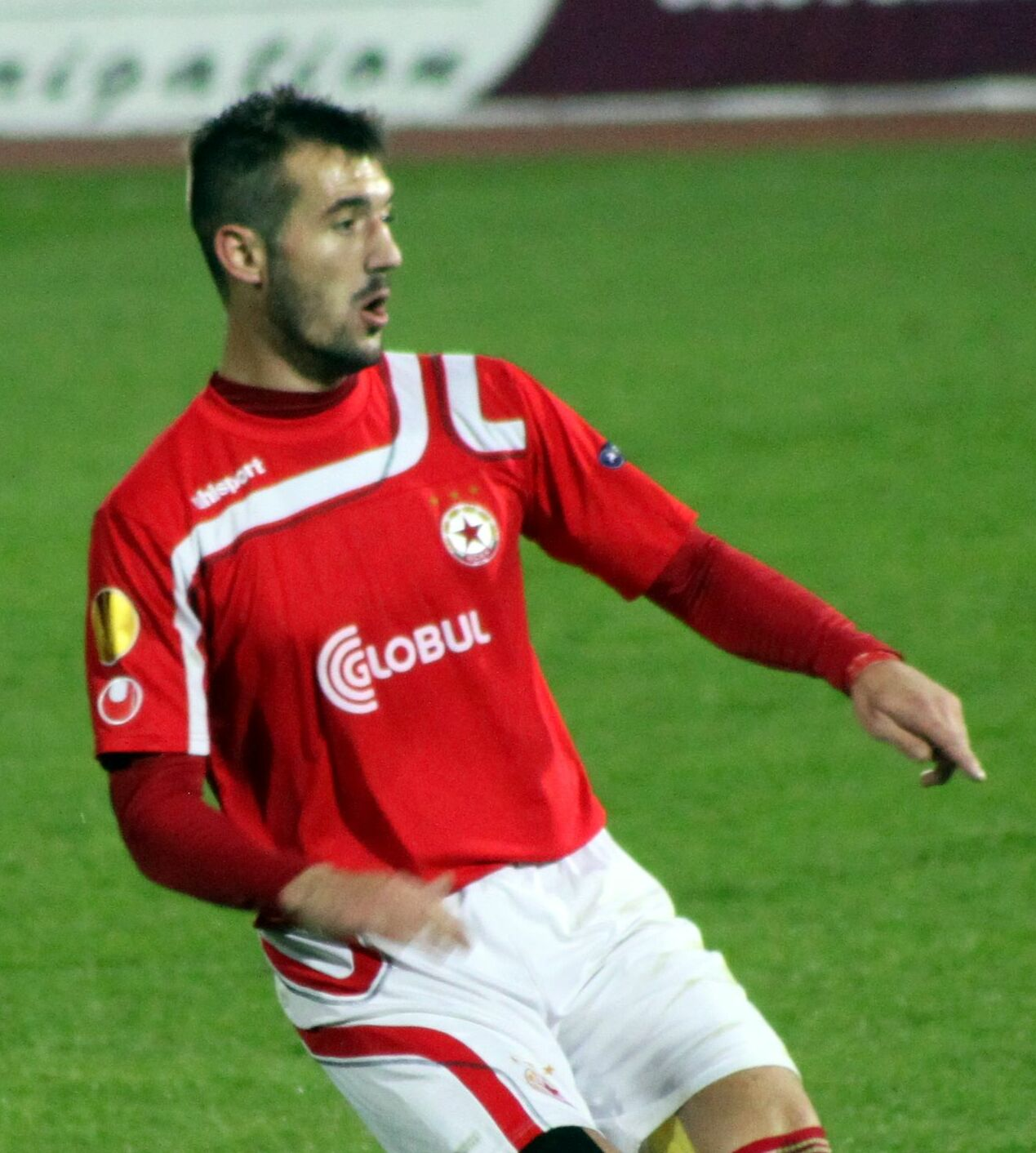
- Vidanov in 2010

Personal information
- Full name: Pavel Valeriev Vidanov
- Date of birth: 1 August 1988 (age 38)
- Place of birth: Sofia, Bulgaria
- Height: 1.85 m (6 ft 1 in)
- Position: Centre-back

Youth career
- CSKA Sofia

Senior career*
Years	Team	Apps	(Gls)
2007–2011	CSKA Sofia	50	(0)
2008	→ Vihren (loan)	14	(0)
2011	→ Rapid București (loan)	6	(0)
2012–2014	Zagłębie Lubin	55	(0)
2015	Zagłębie Lubin II	2	(0)
2014–2015	Trapani	4	(1)
2015–2016	Górnik Zabrze	13	(0)
2016	Górnik Zabrze II	2	(0)
2016–2017	Lokomotiv Plovdiv	25	(1)
2017–2018	Beroe	23	(0)
2018	Slavia Sofia	1	(0)
2019	Atlantas	1	(0)
2019–2020	Pirin Blagoevgrad	6	(0)
Total		202	(2)

International career
2008–2009	Bulgaria U21	11	(0)
2009–2014	Bulgaria	5	(0)
- * Club domestic league appearances and goals

Pavel Vidanov (Bulgarian: Павел Виданов; born 1 August 1988) is a Bulgarian former professional footballer who played as a defender.

== Career ==
=== CSKA Sofia ===
Born in Sofia, Vidanov began his career with local club CSKA Sofia. He made his professional debut in a 2–0 home win over Botev Plovdiv on 18 April 2007, coming on as a substitute for Tiago Silva. He made his first start on 27 May against Belasitsa Petrich at Tsar Samuil Stadium in the last game of the 2006–07 season.

In January 2008, he was loaned out to Vihren Sandanski for the rest of the season, where he played 14 games in the A Group.

In June 2008, Vidanov returned to CSKA. Since then, he played as regular for CSKA and was also called up to the national team of his country.

==== Rapid București (loan) ====
On 19 February 2011, Vidanov was loaned out to the Romanian club Rapid București with an option for purchase at the end of the 2010–11 Liga I season. He made his debut in a 3–2 away loss against Gloria Bistrița on 18 March. Vidanov returned to CSKA at the end of the season having made only 6 appearances in Liga I.

=== Zagłębie Lubin ===
On 21 January 2012, Vidanov joined Polish club Zagłębie Lubin. He made his Ekstraklasa debut on 19 February, in a 2–2 home draw against Wisła Kraków. Vidanov's contract with Zagłębie expired at the end of the 2013–14 season and he left the club as a free agent.

=== Trapani ===
On 26 October 2014, Vidanov signed a one-year contract with Italian Serie B club Trapani Calcio after successfully completing a trial period. He made his debut on 8 November against Frosinone but was replaced through injury after 36 minutes. Vidanov scored his first goal in a 2–2 home draw against Perugia on 12 December.

=== Lokomotiv Plovdiv ===
Vidanov joined Lokomotiv Plovdiv on 3 October 2016.

=== Beroe ===
On 19 June 2017, Vidanov signed with Beroe Stara Zagora. He left the club at the end of the 2017–18 season.

== International ==
On 12 August 2009, Vidanov made his debut for the senior team in a friendly match against Latvia after coming on as a substitute for Blagoy Georgiev in the 75th minute.

== Honours ==
CSKA Sofia

- Bulgarian Cup: 2010–11
- Bulgarian Supercup: 2008
