= 2008 Bulgarian Supercup =

CSKA Sofia	Litex Lovech
A Group	A Group
1	0
- Date: 3 August 2008
- Venue: Vasil Levski National Stadium, Sofia, Bulgaria
- Referee: Nikolay Yordanov (Sofia)
- Attendance: 9,000

The 2008 Bulgarian Supercup was the sixth Bulgarian Supercup match, a football match which was contested between the A Group champion, CSKA Sofia, and the winner of Bulgarian Cup, Litex Lovech. The match was held on 3 August 2008 at the Vasil Levski National Stadium in Sofia, Bulgaria. CSKA beat Litex 1–0 to win their third Bulgarian Supercup.

== Match details ==
3 August 2008
20:30 EEST

CSKA Sofia	1–0	Litex Lovech
Kotev 65'

Vasil Levski, Sofia
Attendance: 9,000
Referee: Nikolay Yordanov (Sofia)

CSKA Sofia	Litex Lovech

CSKA:
GK	25	(Cameroon) Daniel Bekono
DF	30	(Bulgaria) Yordan Todorov (yellow card) 39'
DF	10	(Bulgaria) Ivan Ivanov
DF	6	(Bulgaria) Kiril Kotev (yellow card) 90'
DF	84	(Brazil) Filipe Machado
MF	5	(Bulgaria) Todor Yanchev (c)
MF	15	(Bulgaria) Nikolay Chipev (yellow card) 55'
MF	24	(Bulgaria) Aleksandar Tonev (yellow card) 86'
MF	21	(Nigeria) Chigozie Udoji (substituted off) 73'
FW	99	(Brazil) Nei (substituted off) 82'
FW	19	(Bulgaria) Evgeni Yordanov
Substitutes:
GK	1	(Bulgaria) Ventsislav Velinov
DF	3	(Bulgaria) Pavel Vidanov
FW	8	(Bulgaria) Martin Toshev (substituted on) 82'
FW	9	(Bulgaria) Vladislav Zlatinov (substituted on) 73'
DF	18	(Bulgaria) Aleksandar Sabev
DF	20	(Bulgaria) Aleksandar Branekov
MF	26	(Bulgaria) Yanko Sandanski
Manager:
(Bulgaria) Dimitar Penev Assistant referees: (Bulgaria) Nikola Dzhuganski (Bulgaria) Nikolay Angelov; Fourth official: (Bulgaria) Tsvetan Georgiev

Litex:
GK	12	(Bulgaria) Todor Todorov
DF	16	(Bulgaria) Stanislav Manolev
DF	3	(France) Cédric Cambon
DF	22	(Bulgaria) Plamen Nikolov
DF	23	(Bulgaria) Petar Zanev
MF	6	(France) Alexis Bertin
MF	8	(Brazil) Tom (substituted off) 82'
MF	26	(Brazil) Dudu (substituted off) 69'
MF	10	(Brazil) Sandrinho (yellow card) 43'
MF	32	(Bulgaria) Ivelin Popov (c)
FW	11	(Bulgaria) Emil Angelov (yellow card) 30' (substituted off) 60'
Substitutes:
GK	1	(Serbia) Uroš Golubović
DF	2	(France) Alexandre Barthe
MF	17	(France) Jérémy Acedo
FW	18	(Bulgaria) Krum Bibishkov (substituted on) 82'
FW	19	(France) Wilfried Niflore (substituted on) 60'
FW	27	(Bulgaria) Momchil Tsvetanov (substituted on) 69'
DF	33	(Bosnia and Herzegovina) Džemal Berberović
Manager:
(Bulgaria) Stanimir Stoilov
