= Dormushali Saidhodzha =

Bulgarian footballer

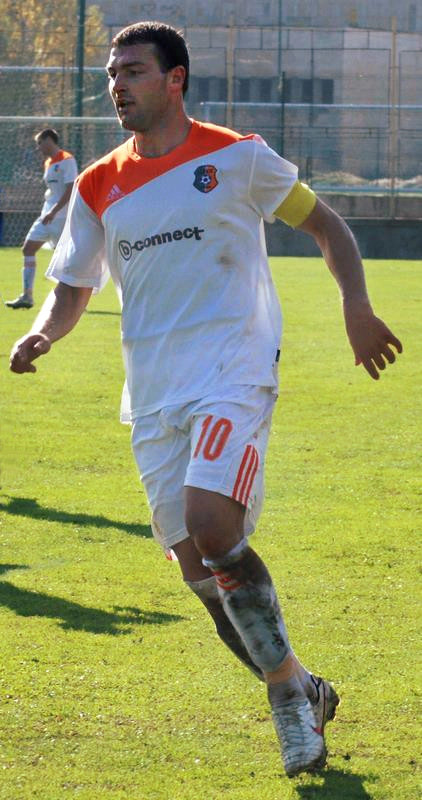

Personal information
- Full name: Dormushali Safet Saidhodzha
- Date of birth: 16 May 1986 (age 40)
- Place of birth: Asenovgrad, Bulgaria
- Height: 1.88 m (6 ft 2 in)
- Position: Striker

Youth career
- Asenovets
- Botev Plovdiv

Senior career*
Years	Team	Apps	(Gls)
2003–2008	Botev Plovdiv	102	(34)
2006–2007	→ Randers (loan)	2	(0)
2009–2010	CSKA Sofia	28	(8)
2010	→ Litex Lovech (loan)	11	(1)
2011	Lokomotiv Sofia	12	(1)
2011–2012	AEP Paphos	7	(5)
2012–2013	Etar 1924	19	(4)

International career
2006–2007	Bulgaria U21	5	(0)
- * Club domestic league appearances and goals as of 20:11, 7 May 2013 (UTC)

Dormushali Safet Saidhodzha or simply Mushi (Bulgarian: Дормушали Саидходжа, Turkish: Saffet Durmuş Ali Saidhoca (born 16 May 1986) is a Bulgarian football striker of Turkish heritage.

== Career ==
=== Botev Plovdiv ===
Saidhodzha started to play in local team Asenovets. Then he moved to Botev Plovdiv. Three years later he signed his first professional contract with Botev Plovdiv. He made his official debut for Botev in a match against Lokomotiv Sofia on 29 November 2003. He substituted Stefan Kostadinov in the second half and played for 26 minutes. The result of the match was a 0:1 loss for Botev. On 6 April 2005 Muscho, as he is known among the Botev supporters, scored six goals against Lokomotiv Gorna Oryahovitsa in a match from Bulgarian second division. He scored in the 5th, 42nd, 59th, 61st, 77th and 79th minute. The result of the match was an 8:0 win for Botev.

In January 2007 Saidhodzha was loaned out for six months to Danish professional football team Randers FC. However, he played in only two matches and returned to Botev in June 2007.

On 25 August 2008 it was reported in the Bulgaria media that he was a target for Austria side LASK Linz. Few days later LASK Linz officially invited Saidhodzha to join the training sessions of their first team for a week.

=== CSKA Sofia ===
In the winter break of 2008-09 season he moved to CSKA Sofia. He scored in his unofficial debut for the club against FK Jagodina netting the third goal for the final 4:1 win for CSKA. He scored 9 goals in 13 matches for CSKA and a total 15 goals in 29 matches for CSKA Sofia and Botev Plovdiv.

=== Litex Lovech ===
On 31 August 2009, several hours before the end of the summer transfer window, he was loaned to Litex Lovech for six months. In his spell at Litex, Saidhodzha made 18 appearances and scored 6 goals.

=== AEP Paphos ===
In the summer of 2011 Saidhodzha signed with Cypriot side AEP Paphos.

=== Etar Veliko Tarnovo ===
During the 2012/2013 A PFG season he played for Etar Veliko Tarnovo, captaining the team on occasions.

== International career ==
Between 2006 and 2007 Saidhodzha played for the Bulgaria national under-21 football team.

== Honours ==
Litex Lovech

- Bulgarian Supercup Runners-up: 2009
- Bulgarian A PFG: 2009–10

CSKA Sofia

- Bulgarian A PFG Runners-up: 2008-09
