= Borislav Hazurov =

Bulgarian footballer

Personal information
- Full name: Borislav Angelov Hazurov
- Date of birth: 4 October 1985 (age 41)
- Place of birth: Blagoevgrad, Bulgaria
- Height: 1.83 m (6 ft 0 in)
- Position: Striker

Team information
- Current team: Bansko
- Number: 21

Youth career
- Pirin Blagoevgrad

Senior career*
Years	Team	Apps	(Gls)
2002–2003	Pirin Blagoevgrad	9	(1)
2003–2007	Litex Lovech	37	(8)
2007	→ Marek Dupnitsa (loan)	6	(0)
2007–2009	Pirin Blagoevgrad	41	(7)
2009–2010	Lokomotiv Mezdra	11	(3)
2010–2011	Bansko	24	(9)
2011	Atromitos Yeroskipou	0	(0)
2012	Bdin Vidin	4	(0)
2012–2014	Pirin Gotse Delchev	53	(8)
2014–2016	Bansko	49	(15)
2016	Pirin Gotse Delchev	16	(6)
2017–2018	Septemvri Simitli	47	(29)
2018	Vihren Sandanski	13	(4)
2019–2021	Septemvri Simitli	35	(14)
2021-	Bansko	65	(23)

International career
- Bulgaria U21
- * Club domestic league appearances and goals as of 13 April 2022

Borislav Hazurov (Bulgarian: Борислав Хазуров; born 4 October 1985) is a Bulgarian footballer who currently plays for Bansko as a striker.

== Career ==
Hazurov previously played for Pirin Blagoevgrad, Litex Lovech, Marek Dupnitsa, Lokomotiv Mezdra and Bansko. He has been capped for the Bulgaria U21 national side.

== Personal life ==
Borislav has a cousin who is also a football forward – Kostadin Hazurov.
