= Yordan Todorov (footballer, born July 1981) =

Bulgarian footballer

Personal information
- Full name: Yordan Valkov Todorov
- Date of birth: 27 July 1981 (age 45)
- Place of birth: Plovdiv, Bulgaria
- Height: 1.72 m (5 ft 7 1/2 in)
- Positions: Midfielder; right back

Youth career
- 1993–1997: Maritsa Plovdiv

Senior career*
Years	Team	Apps	(Gls)
1997–2000	Maritsa Plovdiv	54	(6)
2000–2003	Chernomorets Burgas	56	(9)
2003–2009	CSKA Sofia	183	(25)
2010	Lokomotiv Plovdiv	13	(5)
2010	Steaua București	0	(0)
2010	Steaua II București	1	(0)
2010	Minyor Pernik	11	(2)
2011–2012	Lokomotiv Plovdiv	40	(2)
2012–2013	Panserraikos	34	(3)
2013–2014	Lokomotiv Plovdiv	35	(1)
2014–2015	Lokomotiv Sofia	23	(2)
2015–2016	Montana	28	(0)
2016–2018	Wacker Neutraubling	52	(26)
2018	ESV Regensburg	11	(4)
2019–2020	SV Türk Genclik Regensburg	?	(?)
2022–2023	FC Drenovec	?	(?)

International career
2006–2009	Bulgaria	7	(1)
- * Club domestic league appearances and goals as of 28 September 2018

Yordan Valkov Todorov (Bulgarian: Йордан Тодоров; born 27 July 1981, in Plovdiv) is a retired Bulgarian footballer. Mainly a right midfielder, he can also operate as a right back.

== Career ==
=== Youth career ===
Todorov was raised in Maritsa Plovdiv's youth teams. He stayed there for 7 years, before leaving in 2000.

=== Chernomorets Burgas ===
Between 2000 and 2003 he played for Chernomorets Burgas. He capped 56 times and scored 8 goals.

=== CSKA Sofia ===
Because of his good displays he caught the eye of CSKA scouts and signed for "The red" in the early 2003 for a fee of 150 000 €. With CSKA, Todorov became a champion in 2003, 2005 and 2008, and a national cup winner in 2004. Yordan also won the Bulgarian Supercup in 2006 and 2008. In July 2008, a media information appeared that Yordan is wanted by German side TSG 1899 Hoffenheim and Israel champions Beitar Jerusalem F.C. but the transfers collapsed in the last moment. After a series of bad relationships with his coaches, Todorov left CSKA in 2010.

=== Lokomotiv Plovdiv ===
In the beginning of 2010, Todorov signed with Lokomotiv Plovdiv. He relaunched his career, scoring 5 goals in 13 matches and making 3 assists until the end of the 2009/2010 season.

=== Steaua București ===
On 10 June 2010, he signed a contract with Steaua București.

On 29 August 2010, he made a debut for Steaua's second team in Liga II against Otopeni.

On 30 August 2010, after only 2 months and 20 days with Steaua, the Romanian team announced their release of Todorov, because Victor Pițurcă, the coach who took him to Steaua, resigned at the 3rd round of the new season and the new manager no longer needed his services.

== Playing style ==
Todorov plays as a right winger or a right fullback. Todorov plugs in successfully in the attack on the wingside.

== International career ==
Todorov has seven matches and one goal for Bulgaria national football team.

== Career statistics ==
=== International ===
Appearances and goals by national team and year
National team	Year	Apps	Goals
Bulgaria	2006	4	1
Bulgaria	2007	1	0
Bulgaria	2008	–	
Bulgaria	2009	2	0
Total		7	1

Scores and results list Bulgaria's goal tally first, score column indicates score after each Todorov goal.

List of international goals scored by Yordan Todorov
No.	Date	Venue	Opponent	Score	Result	Competition
1	11 May 2006	Kobe Wing Stadium, Kobe, Japan	Scotland	1–1	1–5	2006 Kirin Cup

== Awards ==
CSKA Sofia

- Champion of Bulgaria – 3 times – 2002–03, 2004–05, 2007–08
- Bulgarian Supercup – 2 times – 2006, 2008
- Bulgarian Cup – 1 time – 2005–06
