= PFC Pirin Blagoevgrad =

Pirin Blagoevgrad
- Full name: PFC Pirin Blagoevgrad
- Founded: 1922; 104 years ago as Makedonska Slava
- Dissolved: 2011; 15 years ago

PFC Pirin Blagoevgrad was a Bulgarian professional football club based in Blagoevgrad.

== History ==
=== Makedonska slava ===
Makedonska slava badge

Club was founded in 1928 as Makedonska Slava (lit. 'Macedonian Glory'). In 1948, the club joined the newly established FD Julius Dermendzhiev and ceased its independent existence. In 2000 Makedonska Slava was restored after unification with Granit Stara Kresna.

The 2002–03 season was successful for the club, during which it finished 2nd, and won promotion to the A PFG for first time in the club's history. The club finished in 14th place in its maiden season in the elite, suffering relegation.

=== Pirin Blagoevgrad ===
Pirin badge 2004–2006

Several years after its founding, under the hand of the new owner Nikolay Galchev, the football club renamed to Pirin 1922 in the 2004–05 season and returned again to top flight football for the next, 2005–06 season. That season was a bit controversial as it saw two teams representing the identity of the original club playing in the top flight, the other being FC Pirin Blagoevgrad. FC Pirin only played two matches before being disqualified due to financial problems. PFC Pirin did manage to complete the season, but it finished 14th, again suffering relegation. In the autumn of 2006, the club's name was once again renamed to PFC Pirin Blagoevgrad. The following 2006–07 season, Pirin Blagoevgrad won the Western B PFG and the club joined the A PFG once more.

=== Union ===
In December 2008, club was merged with FC Pirin, which played in the Western B PFG. The new club was named FC Pirin Blagoevgrad and is officially the rightful holder of the club records of the former Pirin, which has played more than 20 seasons in the top flight. According to the Bulgarian Football Union however, the spell i the A Group from 2007 until 2011 is under the records of PFC Pirin and not the unified team.

== Notable players ==
Note: For a complete list of PFC Pirin Blagoevgrad players, see Category:PFC Pirin Blagoevgrad players.
