= 2014–15 Armenian Premier League =

Armenian Premier League
- Season: 2014–15
- Champions: Pyunik
- Champions League: Pyunik
- Europa League: Ulisses; Shirak; Alashkert
- Matches: 60
- Goals: 173 (2.88 per match)
- Top goalscorer: Cesar Romero (19)
- Biggest home win: Ulisses 7-1 Gandzasar Kapan (18 October 2014)
- Biggest away win: Ararat 1-5 Gandzasar Kapan (21 September 2014)
- Highest scoring: Ararat 4-6 Banants (19 October 2014)
- Longest winning run: 7 matches: Ulisses
- Longest unbeaten run: 9 matches: Ulisses
- Longest winless run: 9 matches: Mika
- Longest losing run: 4 matches: Ararat

The 2014–15 Armenian Premier League season was the twenty-third since its establishment. FC Banants are the defending champions.

== Teams ==
Location of teams in the 2014–15 Armenian Premier League

Club	Location	Stadium	Capacity
Alashkert	Yerevan	Alashkert Stadium	6,850
Ararat Yerevan	Yerevan	Hrazdan Stadium	54,208
Banants	Yerevan	Banants Stadium	4,860
Gandzasar Kapan	Kapan	Gandzasar Stadium	3,500
Mika	Yerevan	Mika Stadium	7,250
Pyunik	Yerevan	Football Academy Stadium	1,428
Shirak	Gyumri	Gyumri City Stadium	2,844
Ulisses	Yerevan	Vazgen Sargsyan	14,403

=== Personnel and sponsorship ===
Team	Chairman	Head coach	Captain	Kit manufacturer	Shirt sponsor
Alashkert	(Armenia) Bagrat Navoyan	(Armenia) Abraham Khashmanyan	(Armenia) Vahagn Minasyan	Molten	Bagratour
Ararat Yerevan	(Switzerland) Hrach Kaprielyan	(Armenia) Varuzhan Sukiasyan	(Armenia) Gorik Khachatryan	Adidas	
Banants	(Armenia) Karlen Mkrtchyan	(Slovakia) Zsolt Hornyák	(Armenia) Gevorg Nranyan	Umbro	
Gandzasar Kapan	(Armenia) Maxim Hakobyan (Armenia) Garnik Aghababyan	(Armenia) Ashot Barseghyan	(Armenia) Aleksandr Petrosyan	Umbro	ZCMC
Mika	(Armenia) Carlos Ghazaryan	(Armenia) Aram Voskanyan	(Armenia) Armen Petrosyan	Umbro	
Pyunik	(Armenia) Rafik Hayrapetyan	(Armenia) Sargis Hovsepyan	(Armenia) David Manoyan	Nike	Armenian Development Bank
Shirak	(Armenia) Arman Sahakyan	(Armenia) Vardan Bichakhchyan	(Armenia) Tigran Davtyan	Adidas	ВТБ (VTB)
Ulisses	(Armenia) Genrikh Ghazandzhyan	(Armenia) Suren Chakhalyan	(Armenia) Hovhannes Goharyan	Joma	Холидей Группа Компаний (Holyday Group of Companies)

=== Managerial changes ===
Team	Outgoing manager	Manner of departure	Date of vacancy	Position in table	Incoming manager	Date of appointment
Gandzasar Kapan	(Armenia) Sevada Arzumanyan	Resigned	14 April 2014	Pre-season	(Ukraine) Serhiy Puchkov	30 April 2014
Ararat Yerevan	(Armenia) Abraham Khashmanyan	Resigned	26 April 2014	Pre-season	(Bosnia and Herzegovina) Dušan Mijić	4 July 2014
Ulisses	(Armenia) Karen Barseghyan	Mutual consent	24 July 2014	Pre-season	(Armenia) Suren Chakhalyan	25 July 2014
Alashkert	(Armenia) Armen Gyulbudaghyants	Sacked	30 August 2014	6th	(Armenia) Abraham Khashmanyan	31 August 2014
Ararat Yerevan	(Bosnia and Herzegovina) Dušan Mijić	Sacked	26 September 2014	7th	(Armenia) Samvel Darbinyan	1 October 2014
Ulisses	(Armenia) Suren Chakhalyan	Mutual consent	6 October 2014	1st	(Armenia) Gagik Simonyan (caretaker)	6 October 2014
Ararat Yerevan	(Armenia) Samvel Darbinyan	End of contract	1 December 2014	8th	(Armenia) Suren Chakhalyan	13 December 2014
Gandzasar Kapan	(Ukraine) Serhiy Puchkov	Mutual consent	2 December 2014	4th	(Armenia) Ashot Barseghyan	11 March 2015
Ulisses	(Armenia) Gagik Simonyan	Mutual consent	28 February 2015	2nd	(Russia) Fyodor Shcherbachenko	28 February 2015
Ararat Yerevan	(Armenia) Suren Chakhalyan	Resigned	14 April 2015	8th	(Armenia) Arthur Minasyan (caretaker) (Armenia) Varuzhan Sukiasyan	28 April 2015
Ulisses	(Russia) Fyodor Shcherbachenko	Mutual consent	17 April 2015	3rd	(Armenia) Suren Chakhalyan	18 April 2015

== League table ==
Pos	Team	Pld	W	D	L	GF	GA	GD	Pts	Qualification
1	Pyunik (C)	28	19	4	5	58	26	+32	61	Qualification for the Champions League first qualifying round
2	Ulisses	28	15	5	8	43	32	+11	50	Qualification for the Europa League first qualifying round
3	Shirak	28	14	7	7	51	32	+19	49	Qualification for the Europa League first qualifying round
4	Alashkert	28	10	8	10	32	35	−3	38	Qualification for the Europa League first qualifying round
5	Mika	28	9	10	9	33	34	−1	37	
6	Banants	28	8	8	12	42	46	−4	32	
7	Gandzasar	28	7	8	13	31	44	−13	29	
8	Ararat	28	3	4	21	28	69	−41	13	

Source: uefa.com
Rules for classification: 1) points; 2) goal difference; 3) number of goals scored
(C) Champions

== Results ==
The league was played in four stages. The teams played four times with each other, twice at home and twice away, for a total of 28 matches per team.

=== First half of season ===
Home \ Away	ALA	ARA	BAN	GAN	MIK	PYU	SHI	ULI
Alashkert		3–2	0–0	1–0	2–0	0–2	2–0	0–2
Ararat Yerevan	2–1		4–6	1–5	2–0	0–3	0–2	2–3
Banants	1–0	3–0		3–3	0–2	2–3	1–1	0–2
Gandzasar Kapan	1–0	1–0	3–1		2–1	3–4	0–3	0–0
Mika	0–0	3–1	1–1	1–1		1–1	3–1	3–0
Pyunik	3–3	4–0	1–0	2–0	5–0		1–0	0–2
Shirak	1–1	3–2	2–0	1–0	1–0	0–0		1–2
Ulisses	5–1	2–0	1–0	7–1	3–1	2–1	1–2	

Source: uefa.com
Legend: Blue = home team win; Yellow = draw; Red = away team win.

=== Second half of season ===
Home \ Away	ALA	ARA	BAN	GAN	MIK	PYU	SHI	ULI
Alashkert		1–1	3–1	1–0	1–2	0–1	1–1	1–0
Ararat Yerevan	0–1		2–2	0–2	0–1	2–2	2–4	1–3
Banants	2–0	3–1		3–0	0–0	1–2	3–6	3–0
Gandzasar Kapan	2–3	0–3	2–0		0–0	0–1	3–3	0–0
Mika	1–1	3–0	2–2	1–1		1–0	2–2	1–2
Pyunik	3–1	4–0	1–2	3–1	3–2		2–1	3–0
Shirak	0–2	4–0	2–2	2–0	2–0	0–2		2–0
Ulisses	2–2	0–0	2–1	0–0	0–1	2–1	0–4	

Legend: Blue = home team win; Yellow = draw; Red = away team win.

== Top goalscorers ==
Rank	Player	Team	Goals
1	(Ivory Coast) Jean-Jacques Bougouhi	Shirak	21
1	(Mexico) Cesar Romero	Pyunik	21
3	(Armenia) Kamo Hovhannisyan	Pyunik	10
3	(Armenia) Hovhannes Goharyan	Ulisses	10
3	(Serbia) Aleksandar Rakić	Ararat	10
6	(Armenia) Artak Aleksanyan	Ulisses	9
6	(Armenia) Mihran Manasyan	Alashkert	9
8	(Armenia) Gevorg Nranyan	Banants	6
8	(Armenia) Davit Hakobyan	Shirak	6
8	(Armenia) Gegham Harutyunyan	Gandzasar	6
8	(Ukraine) Vasil Palagnyuk	Gandzasar	6

== See also ==
- 2014–15 Armenian First League
- 2014–15 Armenian Cup
