= Eduard Grigoryan =

Soviet footballer (1929–1988)

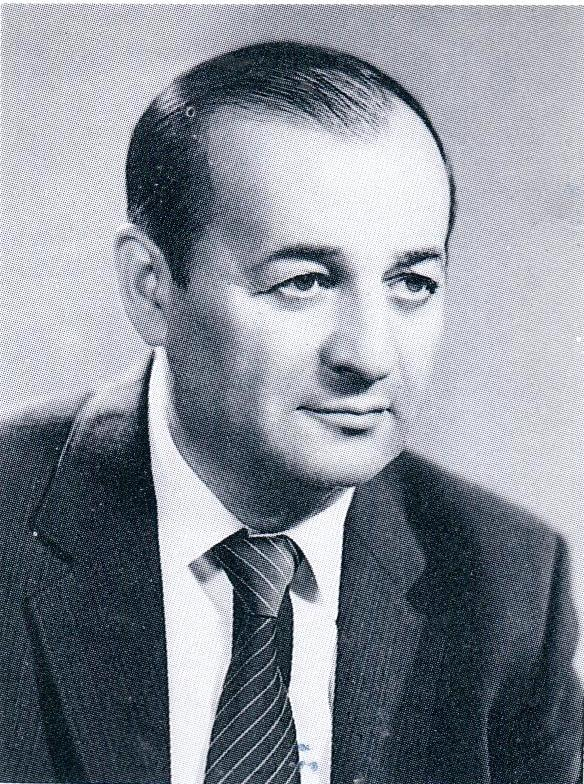

Personal information
- Date of birth: 25 May 1929
- Place of birth: Krasnodar, Russian SFSR, USSR
- Date of death: 11 June 1988 (aged 59)
- Place of death: Yerevan, Armenian SSR
- Position: Forward

Senior career*
| Years | Team | Apps | (Gls) |
| 1944–1952 | FC Dinamo Yerevan | | |

Managerial career
- 1968: Ararat Yerevan
- * Club domestic league appearances and goals

Eduard Grigoryan (Russian: Эдуард Григорьевич Григорян; 25 May 1929 – 11 June 1988) was a professional soccer player, coach and manager of FC Ararat, Honored Coach of Armenia, Honored Worker of Physical Education and Sports, Director of the Republican School of Soccer, and Director of the School of Olympic Reserve of Armenia.

== Early life ==
Eduard Grigoryan was born in 1929 in Krasnodar, U.S.S.R. Soon after his birth, Grigoryan's family moved to Yerevan, Armenia, where he grew up.

== Career ==
Grigoryan became involved in football at an early age. At the age of fifteen, he was recruited by the leading team in Armenia, FC Dinamo Yerevan (later FC Ararat Yerevan). A forward, he played for Dinamo for eight years between 1944 and 1952. The 1949 season is considered Grigoryan's best season, where he scored 28 out of the 42 goals scored by his team. For this, he received the nickname "Armenian Bobrov," after the famous Soviet striker Vsevolod Bobrov.

After completing his studies at Yerevan University of Physical Education, Grigoryan left soccer and turned to coaching at the Yerevan Soccer School after Voroshilov. A few years later, he became Director of the school, which by that time had received the status of Republican. He also became Head Coach of Armenia's National Youth Soccer Team.

In 1968, Grigoryan was appointed Head Coach and Manager of FC Ararat Yerevan. A year later, Grigoryan left coaching to focus on team management. Under his leadership, FC Ararat acquired Levon Ishtoyan, Nazar Petrosyan, Eduard Markarov, Arkady Andreasyan, and goalkeeper Alyosha Abrahamyan. In the 1971, Grigoryan's team won second place in U.S.S.R Premiere League Cup. Two years later, FC Ararat would win the U.S.S.R. Cup.

In 1976, Grigoryan was appointed Director of the School of Olympic Reserve of Armenia, where he worked until his death in 1988. This school would go on to produce fifty world champions and two Olympic champions.

In 1985 Grigoryan participated in organizing the FIFA U-20 World Cup.

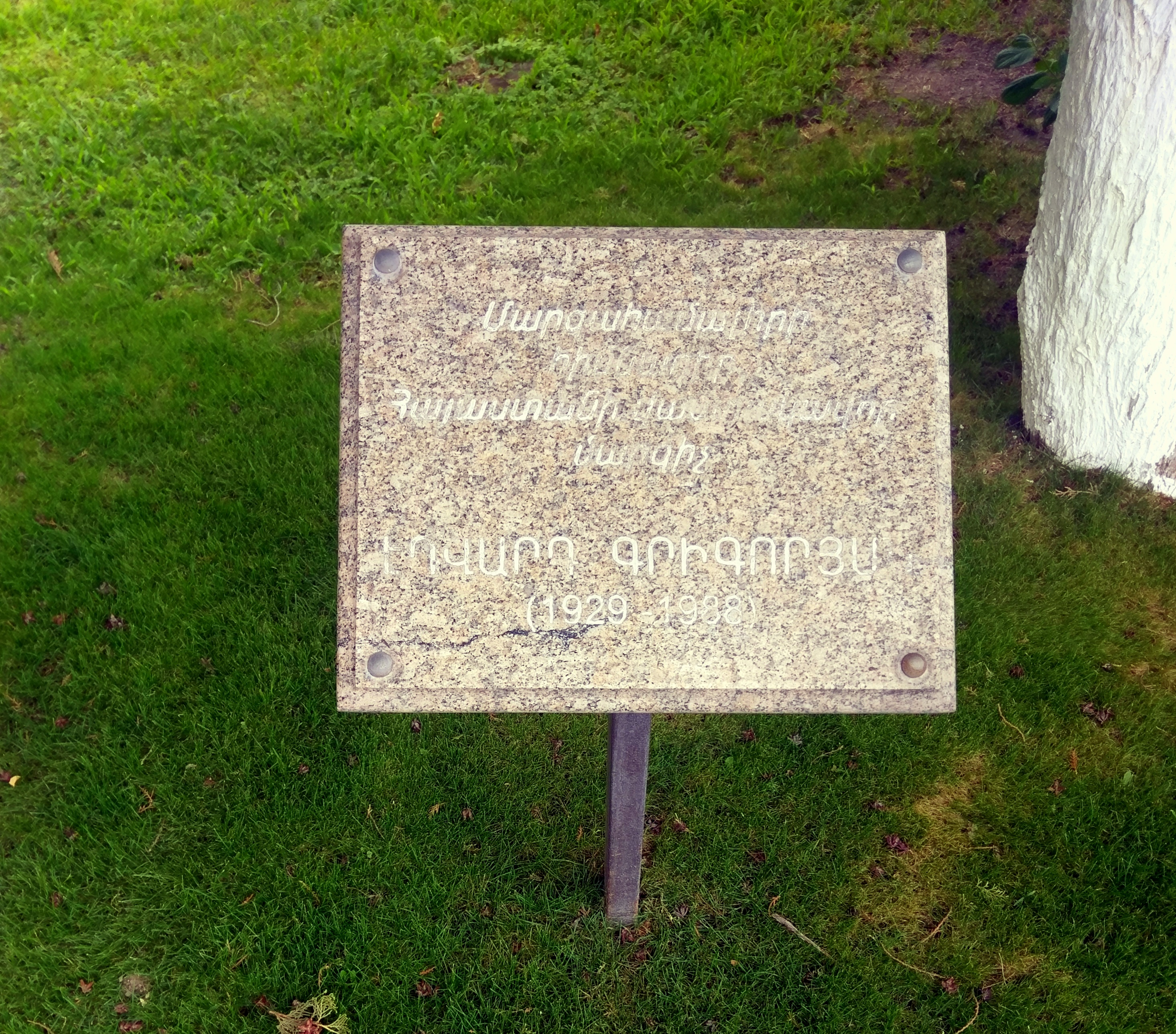
A plaque at the Banants Training Centre honoring Eduard Grigoryan for his contribution in the establishment of the Malatia football school

For his contribution to sports in Armenia, the Republican School of Soccer was renamed after Eduard Grigoryan. Today, the school is used as the training center for FC Banants Yerevan.

== Honors and awards ==
- Honored Coach of Armenia (1965).
- Honored Worker of Physical Education and Sports (1965).
- Order of Friendship of Peoples.
- The U.S.S.R. Olympic Book of Honors.
