= Varuzhan Sukiasyan =

Armenian manager and footballer

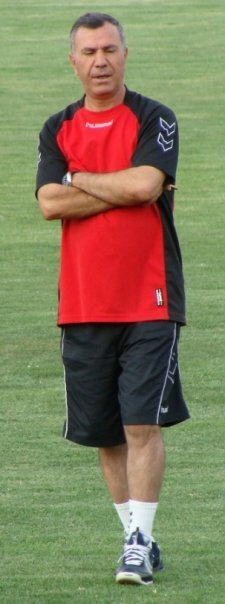

Personal information
- Date of birth: 5 August 1956 (age 70)
- Place of birth: Yerevan, Armenian SSR
- Height: 1.81 m (5 ft 11 in)
- Position: Forward

Senior career*
Years	Team	Apps	(Gls)
1978–1987	Kotayk	183	(66)

Managerial career
- 1989–1990: Lori
- 1992–1994: Banants Kotayk
- 1995: Van Yerevan
- 1997: Homenmen Beirut
- 1998–1999: Tsement Ararat
- 1998–1999: Armenia U21
- 2000: Araks Ararat
- 2000–2001: Armenia
- 2001: Spartak Yerevan
- 2003–2005: Homenmen Beirut
- 2006–2007: Ararat Yerevan
- 2007–2008: Armenia U21
- 2008: Ararat Yerevan
- 2009–2010: Impulse FC
- 2015–2016: Ararat Yerevan
- 2015–2016: Armenia
- 2018: Alashkert
- * Club domestic league appearances and goals

Varuzhan Sukiasyan (Armenian: Վարուժան Սուքիասյան, Russian: Варужан Гарсеванович Сукиасян; born 5 August 1956 in Yerevan), is an Armenian football manager and former player. He is the brother of Yervand Sukiasyan.

Between 1978 and 1987, Sukiasyan played at FC Kotayk of Abovyan. He managed the Armenia national team in the 2000–2001 period. In 2015–2016, he worked as manager of the Armenia national team, his second spell.

== Coaching career ==
In 1989, Sukiasyan began his coaching career in FC Lori from Vanadzor, then was the coach of Banants Kotayk between 1992 and 1994, including when they won the Armenian Cup in 1992. He also was the coach of Van Yerevan and Homenmen Beirut.

In 1998, Sukiasyan became the coach of Tsement Ararat with which he won the Armenian Premier League in 1998 and 2000 and Armenian Cup in 1998 and 1999. In the same time, he managed the Armenia U21 and Armenia senior national teams. In 2001, he also coached the newformed Spartak Yerevan.

He was again the coach of Homenmen Beirut between 2003 and 2005.

He was appointed coach at Ararat Yerevan in July 2006, replacing Abraham Khashmanyan, but resigned in July 2007, and left for the Armenia U-21 team. In March 2008, Sukiasyan was again appointed as the coach of Ararat Yerevan, replacing his successor Dušan Mijić. He was with the club when it won the Armenian Cup and reached the second place in the 2008 Armenian Premier League, after a loss in the championship play-off match against Pyunik. He was again resigned in December 2008. In 2010, he was the coach of Impulse FC from Dilijan.

In April 2015, Sukiasyan was again take seat at Ararat Yerevan.

On 10 December 2015 he was appointed as head coach of the Armenia national football team.

== Personal life ==
Between 2010 and 2015 Sukiasyan worked as the chief of the Yerevan Funeral Home, at the Yerevan Municipal, in Yerevan, Armenia.

== Managerial statistics ==
As of match played 11 October 2016

Team	Nat	From	To	Record				
Team	Nat	From	To	G	W	D	L	Win %
Armenia	(Armenia)	2000	2001	0	0	0	0	—
Armenia	(Armenia)	December 2015	Present	7	2	1	4	28.57
