= Pavel Bagryantsev =

Russian footballer

Personal information
- Full name: Pavel Vasilyevich Bagryantsev
- Date of birth: 14 March 1986 (age 40)
- Height: 1.80 m (5 ft 11 in)
- Position: Midfielder

Senior career*
Years	Team	Apps	(Gls)
2002–2006	Lokomotiv Minsk	43	(5)
2006	Tekstilshchik-Telekom Ivanovo	8	(1)
2007	Lokomotiv Minsk	13	(1)
2008	Sochi-04	4	(0)
2013	Vologda	9	(0)
- * Club domestic league appearances and goals

Pavel Vasilyevich Bagryantsev (Russian: Павел Васильевич Багрянцев; born 14 March 1986) is a Russian former football midfielder.
