= Arkady Andreasyan =

Soviet footballer (1947–2020)

Personal information
- Full name: Arkady Georgievich Andreasyan
- Date of birth: 11 August 1947
- Place of birth: Baku, Azerbaijan SSR, Soviet Union
- Date of death: 23 December 2020 (aged 73)
- Place of death: Yerevan, Armenia
- Height: 1.74 m (5 ft 9 in)
- Position: Midfielder

Youth career
- Neftchi Baku

Senior career*
| Years | Team | Apps | (Gls) |
| 1965–1966 | Shirak Leninakan | | |
| 1966–1967 | Ararat Yerevan | 0 | (0) |
| 1967–1968 | Sevan Hoktemberyan | | |
| 1969–1978 | Ararat Yerevan | 242 | (62) |

International career
| 1971–1972 | Soviet Union (Olympics) | 9 | (3) |
| 1972–1975 | Soviet Union | 12 | (1) |

Managerial career
- 1979–1981: Kotayk Abovyan
- 1981–1983: Ararat Yerevan
- 1984–1985: Spartak Hoktemberyan
- 1986: Kotayk Abovyan
- 1986–1989: Ararat Yerevan
- 1991: Kotayk Abovyan
- 1992–1993: Zvartnots Echmiadzin
- 1993–1995: Homenmen Beirut
- 1996–2003: Ararat Yerevan
- 2005: Lernain
- 2007–2008: Mika Yerevan
- 2009–: Ararat Yerevan (Vice-President)
- 2009: Ararat Yerevan (Acting manager)
- 2011–2012: Ararat Yerevan
Medal record
Representing Soviet Union
Men's Football
| Bronze medal – third place | 1972 Munich | Team competition |
- * Club domestic league appearances and goals

Arkady Georgievich Andreasyan (Armenian: Արկադի Գեորգիի Անդրեասյան, Russian: Аркадий Георгиевич Андреасян; 11 August 1947 – 23 December 2020) was a Soviet Armenian football player and manager. He played as midfielder for Ararat Yerevan in most of his club career and for the Soviet Union national football team. He was a member of the Ararat Yerevan team that won the Soviet Top League in 1973 and the Soviet Cup in 1973 and 1975 and a member of the Soviet Olympic football team that won bronze at the 1972 Summer Olympics. Andreasyan was awarded the Master of Sport of the USSR title in 1971, the Honoured Coach of the Armenian SSR title in 1982 and the Order For Merit to the Fatherland of Armenia in 2011. He was the manager of Ararat Yerevan.

== Club career ==
Arkady Andreasyan was born in Baku, Azerbaijan SSR to an Armenian family. He was a pupil of the Neftchi Baku football school. Andreasyan moved to the Armenian SSR for his senior career when he joined Shirak Leninakan in 1965. He left Shirak after one season. Andreasyan became a member of Ararat Yerevan in 1966. He didn't get to play for Araray at all his first year and moved to Sevan Hoktemberyan in 1967 and played for the team until 1968. Once the 1969 season began, Andreasyan moved back to Ararat Yerevan. His debut match took place on 4 April 1969 in Yerevan in a match against Dynamo Kyiv. Ararat Yerevan won the 1973 Soviet Top League and the Soviet Cup in 1973 and 1975. These achievements are considered among the greatest milestones in the history of Armenian football to this day. Andreasyan played as one of the main midfielders of Ararat during these years. In the 1974–75 European Cup, Andreasyan scored the fifth and final goal in a dominant 5–0 victory over Cork Celtic. Ararat Yerevan advanced to the quarterfinals, where the team played two games against Bayern Munich, losing the first 0–2. At the second match, in Hrazdan Stadium, Yerevan, Andreasyan scored the only goal of the game at the 35th minute and Ararat Yerevan won 1–0. Bayern moved on due to aggregate and went on to win the European Cup.

Andreasyan retired as a football player in 1978. He played a total of 242 matches and scored a total of 62 goals for Ararat Yerevan.

== International career ==
Andreasyan made his debut for the Soviet Union Olympic football team on 2 June 1971 in a match against the Netherlands, which the Soviet team won 4–0. He was a member of the Soviet Union Olympic football team that competed at the 1972 Summer Olympics. Following the Soviet national squad's only loss to Poland, they tied with East Germany in the bronze medal match, and thus both teams won bronze medals.

== Managerial career ==
Andreasyan became a football manager in 1979. Over the years, he managed Kotayk Abovyan, Ararat Yerevan, Spartak Hoktemberyan, Zvartnots Echmiadzin, Homenmen Beirut and Mika Yerevan. Ararat Yerevan won the 1996–97 Armenian Cup when Andreasyan was managing the team. Andreasyan became the vice-president of Ararat Yerevan in 2009 and held the position until his death in 2020. He assumed the role of acting manager of Ararat in March 2009 when Ashot Kirakosyan left the manager position. Andreasyan upheld the role for the rest of the year, after which Tigran Yesayan became the new manager. On 16 February 2010, Yesayan had resigned from his post as manager of Ararat Yerevan. The reason for this was because of the low quality of the preparatory process for the team during the fall and spring collections team and the lack of serious recruitment of players that would seriously strengthen the team in matches of the Armenian Premier League. A short time before the start of the next Premier League, the team training process was led by a former assistant coach Edgar Safaryan and Alyosha Abrahamyan. However, on 5 March, in the first round of the 2011 Armenian Premier League in a match against Banants Yerevan, Andreasyan was coaching Ararat Yerevan. At that time, he had not been the official head coach. Three days later, Andreasyan officially became the manager of Ararat Yerevan once again. During a break in the 6th round match between Ararat Yerevan and Pyunik Yerevan, Andreasyan, with a group of unknown assailants, reportedly beat up a photojournalist when he photographed Andreasyan. Later, Andreasyan and a group of unidentified people were prosecuted for this event. On 28 April, during a regular meeting of the Disciplinary Committee of the Football Federation of Armenia, the question of recognizing Andreasyan as an unwelcome person in Armenian football for his hooliganic, obscene and unsportsmanlike conduct was discussed. In addition, for his disruptive behavior at halftime of the Ararat and Pyunik match, Andreasyan was banned for five matches and the club was fined 115,000 drams ($275). At the same time, the Ararat fan club demanded Andreasyan's resignation from the positions of head coach and vice-president of Ararat. In February 2012, Andreasyan was replaced by Albert Safaryan, a previous assistant coach of the club, as manager of Ararat Yerevan. Andreasyan didn't participate in the training and coaching duties in the previous month of January. This work was carried out by Safaryan then as well.

== Personal life ==
Andreasyan came from a family of football players. His father, George Andreasyan, was a football player who played for Lokomotiv Baku in the 1937 Soviet Second League B in Group D and for Dinamo Yerevan, which won the 1936 Armenian Soviet Socialist Republic championships. He later coached Lokomotiv Baku. Arkady's uncle, Hayk Andriasyan, played for Lokomotiv Moscow and coached a number of Armenian teams. Andreasyan was married and had a son named George, who was also a football player and played for a number of Armenian clubs, including for Ararat Yerevan.

== Honours ==
Individual

- IFA Shield Player of the Tournament: 1978
- Order For Merit to the Fatherland (Armenia), 2011
