= 1995 Armenian Cup =

Tournament details
- Country: Armenia
- Teams: 18

Final positions
- Champions: Ararat Yerevan
- Runners-up: Kotayk

Tournament statistics
- Matches played: 23
- Goals scored: 77 (3.35 per match)

The 1995 Armenian Cup was the fourth edition of the Armenian Cup, a football competition. In 1995, the tournament had 18 participants, of which only one was a reserve team.

== Results ==
=== Preliminary round ===
The matches were played on 5 March 1995.

| Team 1 | Score | Team 2 |
|---|---|---|
| Kotayk | w/o | FIMA Yerevan |
| BMA-Arai Echmiadzin | 4–1 | Aragats |

=== First round ===
| Team 1 | Score | Team 2 |
|---|---|---|
| Kotayk-2 | 2–2 (3–1 p) | Tufagorts |
| Dinamo Yerevan | 3–4 | Tsement Ararat |
| Arabkir | 2–1 | Aznavour |
| Shirak | 4–0 | Zangezour |
| Homenetmen Yerevan | 4–0 | Yerazank |
| BKMA Yerevan | 0–1 | Kotayk |
| Homenmen Yerevan | 4–1 | BMA-Arai Echmiadzin |
| Van Yerevan | 1–2 | Ararat |

=== Quarter-finals ===
The first legs were played on 4 April 1995. The second legs were played on 13 and 14 April 1995.

| Team 1 | Agg. | Team 2 | 1st leg | 2nd leg |
|---|---|---|---|---|
| Homenetmen Yerevan | 1–3 | Shirak | 1–2 | 0–1 |
| Arabkir | 1–11 | Ararat | 0–2 | 1–9 |
| Homenmen Yerevan | 2–3 | Tsement Ararat | 2–0 | 0–3 |
| Kotayk | 4–2 | Kotayk-2 | 3–0 | 1–2 |

=== Semi-finals ===
The first legs were played on 5 May 1995. The second legs were played on 14 May 1995.

| Team 1 | Agg. | Team 2 | 1st leg | 2nd leg |
|---|---|---|---|---|
| Tsement Ararat | 1–4 | Ararat | 0–3 | 1–1 |
| Kotayk | 2–1 | Shirak | 2–1 | 0–0 |

=== Final ===
28 May 1995

| Kotayk | 2 – 4 | Ararat |
|---|---|---|
| Barseghyan 86' (pen.), 88' (pen.) | | Yeritsyan 13' (o.g.); Harutyunyan 26'; Mkhitaryan 42'; Ter-Petrosyan 77' |

Hrazdan Stadium, Yerevan
Attendance: 1,000
Referee: Gevorg Oganesyan (Yerevan)

== See also ==
- 1995 Armenian Premier League
