= 1999 Armenian Cup =

Tournament details
- Country: Armenia
- Teams: 16

Final positions
- Champions: Tsement
- Runners-up: Shirak

Tournament statistics
- Matches played: 25
- Goals scored: 95 (3.8 per match)

The 1999 Armenian Cup was the eighth edition of the Armenian Cup, a football competition. In 1999, the tournament had 16 participants, out of which only 1 was a reserve team.

== Results ==
=== First round ===
The first legs were played on 3 April 1999. The second legs were played on 11 April 1999.

Team 1	Agg.	Team 2	1st leg	2nd leg
FIMA Yerevan	1–10	Shirak	1–8	0–2
Zvartnots-AAL	4–1	Karabakh-2 Stepanakert	2–0	2–1
Kilikia	5–1	Lori	4–1	1–0
Kasakh	0–4	Yerevan	0–1	0–3
Karabakh Stepanakert	0–5	Ararat Yerevan	0–2	0–3 (f)
Alashkert	0–7	Erebuni-Homenmen	0–4	0–3 (f)
Gyumri	2–6	Dvin Artashat	1–2	1–4
Dinamo Yerevan	0–11	Tsement	0–7	0–4

=== Quarter-finals ===
The first legs were played on 20 April 1999. The second legs were played on 30 April 1999.

Team 1	Agg.	Team 2	1st leg	2nd leg
Dvin Artashat	0–6	Tsement	0–4	0–2
Yerevan	(a) 2–2	Kilikia	0–1	2–1
Ararat Yerevan	1–2	Erebuni-Homenmen	1–1	0–1
Zvartnots-AAL	2–2 (a)	Shirak	2–1	0–1

=== Semi-finals ===
The first legs were played on 11 May 1999. The second legs were played on 20 May 1999.

Team 1	Agg.	Team 2	1st leg	2nd leg
Erebuni-Homenmen	4–7	Tsement	2–4	2–3
Shirak	3–2	Yerevan	3–1	0–1

=== Final ===
29 May 1999

Tsement	3 – 2	Shirak
Hayk Hakobyan 3', 16'; Ara Hakobyan 43'		Bernetsyan 5'; Artoryan 76'

Hrazdan Stadium, Yerevan
Attendance: 2,500
Referee: Kazaryan (Yerevan)

== See also ==
- 1999 Armenian Premier League
