= Boris Apukhtin =

Russian association football player

Personal information
- Full name: Boris Trifonovich Apukhtin
- Date of birth: February 19, 1906
- Place of birth: Kraskovo, Russian Empire
- Date of death: February 27, 1975 (aged 69)
- Place of death: Moscow, Soviet Union
- Height: 1.78 m (5 ft 10 in)
- Position: Midfielder

Youth career
- 1914–1916: Kraskovo
- 1916–1918: ZKS Moscow

Senior career*
Years	Team	Apps	(Gls)
1919–1924	VTOPAS Moscow		
1925–1927	MOGES Moscow		
1928–1933	Serp i Molot Moscow		
1934–1941	GCOLIFK Moscow		

Managerial career
- 1936: Proletarskaya Pobeda Moscow
- 1946: Dynamo Kyiv
- 1948: Lokomotiv Moscow
- 1949: Dynamo Yerevan
- 1950: Krasnoye Znamya Ivanovo
- 1948–1952: Albania (consultant)
- 1968: Neftyanik Fergana (director)
- * Club domestic league appearances and goals as of 12 May 2012

Boris Trifonovich Apukhtin (Russian: Бори́с Три́фонович Апу́хтин; 19 February 1906 – 4 March 1975) was a Russian footballer and coach.

In 1916 he began his playing career at the Moscow team ZKS Moscow (Zamoskvorietsky Club of Sport). In 1919, he was a footballer for VTOPAS Moscow (All-Russian Society of Educational and Industrial Associations). He then he performed in clubs such as MOGES Moscow and FC Serp i Molot Moscow. In 1934 he moved to GCOLIFK football team. In 1941, upon the commencement of the Great Patriotic War he was forced to end his playing career. He defended the team colors of Moscow and the Russian Central Council of Trade Unions (VTSPS) (1931–1933).

In 1936 he coached the club Proletarskaya Pobeda Moscow. In June 1946 he was appointed head coach of Dynamo Kiev, with whom he worked until the end of the year. In the first half of 1948 he led Lokomotiv Moscow and in the second half of 1949, Dinamo Yerevan. In 1950 he coached the club Krasnoye Znamya Ivanovo. From August until the end of 1968 he worked as the Director of Neftyanik Fergana. In the meantime, he was a consulting coach of the Albania national football team in 1948-1952. In the years 1943-1968 he worked intermittently as a senior manager in the Department of Sport Football Committee of the USSR. He was the author of The Technique of Football (1956, 1958), Tactical Preparation of Players (1961) etc. He died on February 27, 1975, in Moscow at the age of 69.

Apukhtin was awarded the title Master of Sports of the USSR in 1948 and the title of Merited Sports Coach of the USSR in 1957.
