= 1974–75 European Cup =

European football tournament

Tournament details
- Dates: 18 September 1974 – 28 May 1975
- Teams: 30 (29 competed)

Final positions
- Champions: (West Germany) Bayern Munich (2nd title)
- Runners-up: (England) Leeds United

Tournament statistics
- Matches played: 55
- Goals scored: 174 (3.16 per match)
- Attendance: 1,484,032 (26,982 per match)
- Top scorer(s): Eduard Markarov (Ararat Yerevan); Gerd Müller (Bayern Munich); 5 goals each

The 1974–75 season was the 20th season of the European Cup, an annual football tournament for the champion clubs of the member nations of UEFA (the Union of European Football Associations). It was won for the second consecutive time by Bayern Munich in the final against Leeds United, the first English side to reach the final since Manchester United won it seven years earlier and only the second in the history of the competition.

== Teams ==
(Austria) VÖEST Linz (1st)	(Belgium) Anderlecht (1st)	(Bulgaria) Levski-Spartak (1st)
(Cyprus) Omonia (1st)	(Czechoslovakia) Slovan Bratislava (1st)	(Denmark) Hvidovre (1st)
(England) Leeds United (1st)	(Finland) HJK (1st)	(France) Saint-Étienne (1st)
(East Germany) Magdeburg (1st)	(West Germany) Bayern Munich (1st)^{TH}	(Greece) Olympiacos (1st)
(Hungary) Újpesti Dózsa (1st)	(Iceland) Keflavík (1st)	(Republic of Ireland) Cork Celtic (1st)
(Luxembourg) Jeunesse Esch (1st)	(Malta) Valletta (1st)	(Netherlands) Feyenoord (1st)
(Northern Ireland) Coleraine (1st)	(Norway) Viking (1st)	(Poland) Ruch Chorzów (1st)
(Portugal) Sporting CP (1st)	(Romania) Universitatea Craiova (1st)	(Scotland) Celtic (1st)
(Spain) Barcelona (1st)	(Sweden) Åtvidaberg (1st)	(Switzerland) Zürich (1st)
(Turkey) Fenerbahçe (1st)	(Soviet Union) Ararat Yerevan (1st)	(Socialist Federal Republic of Yugoslavia) Hajduk Split (1st)

== Bracket ==
1st Round
(Denmark) Hvidovre	0	1	1
(Poland) Ruch Chorzów	0	2	2
(Luxembourg) Jeunesse Esch	2	0	2
(Turkey) Fenerbahçe	3	2	5
(Socialist Federal Republic of Yugoslavia) Hajduk Split	7	2	9
(Iceland) Keflavík	1	0	1
(France) Saint-Étienne	2	1	3
(Portugal) Sporting CP	0	1	1
(East Germany) Magdeburg (w/d)	-	-	-
(Italy) Lazio	-	-	-
(Republic of Ireland) Cork Celtic (w/o)	-	-	-
(Cyprus) Omonia	-	-	-
(Norway) Viking	0	2	2
(Soviet Union) Ararat Yerevan	2	4	6
(Bulgaria) Levski-Spartak	0	1	1
(Hungary) Újpesti Dózsa	3	4	7
(England) Leeds United	4	1	5
(Switzerland) Zürich	1	2	3
(Czechoslovakia) Slovan Bratislava	4	1	5
(Belgium) Anderlecht (a)	2	3	5
(Scotland) Celtic	1	0	1
(Greece) Olympiacos	1	2	3
(Netherlands) Feyenoord	7	4	11
(Northern Ireland) Coleraine	0	1	1
(Austria) VÖEST Linz	0	0	0
(Spain) Barcelona	0	5	5
(Malta) Valletta	1	1	2
(Finland) HJK	0	4	4
(Romania) Universitatea Craiova	2	1	3
(Sweden) Åtvidaberg	1	3	4

2nd Round
(Poland) Ruch Chorzów	2	2	4
(Turkey) Fenerbahçe	1	0	1
(Socialist Federal Republic of Yugoslavia) Hajduk Split	4	1	5
(France) Saint-Étienne	1	5	6
(West Germany) Bayern Munich	3	2	5
(East Germany) Magdeburg	2	1	3
(Republic of Ireland) Cork Celtic	1	0	1
(Soviet Union) Ararat Yerevan	2	5	7
(Hungary) Újpesti Dózsa	1	0	1
(England) Leeds United	2	3	5
(Belgium) Anderlecht	5	0	5
(Greece) Olympiacos	1	3	4
(Netherlands) Feyenoord	0	0	0
(Spain) Barcelona	0	3	3
(Finland) HJK	0	0	0
(Sweden) Åtvidaberg	3	1	4

Quarterfinals
(Poland) Ruch Chorzów	3	0	3
(France) Saint-Étienne	2	2	4
(West Germany) Bayern Munich	2	0	2
(Soviet Union) Ararat Yerevan	0	1	1
(England) Leeds United	3	1	4
(Belgium) Anderlecht	0	0	0
(Spain) Barcelona	2	3	5
(Sweden) Åtvidaberg	0	0	0

Semifinals
(France) Saint-Étienne	0	0	0
(West Germany) Bayern Munich	0	2	2
(England) Leeds United	2	1	3
(Spain) Barcelona	1	1	2

Finals
(West Germany) Bayern Munich	2
(England) Leeds United	0

== First round ==
Team 1	Agg.	Team 2	1st leg	2nd leg
Hvidovre (Denmark)	1–2	(Poland) Ruch Chorzów	0–0	1–2
Jeunesse Esch (Luxembourg)	2–5	(Turkey) Fenerbahçe	2–3	0–2
Hajduk Split (Socialist Federal Republic of Yugoslavia)	9–1	(Iceland) Keflavík	7–1	2–0
Saint-Étienne (France)	3–1	(Portugal) Sporting CP	2–0	1–1
Viking (Norway)	2–6	(Soviet Union) Ararat Yerevan	0–2	2–4
Levski-Spartak (Bulgaria)	1–7	(Hungary) Újpesti Dózsa	0–3	1–4
Leeds United (England)	5–3	(Switzerland) Zürich	4–1	1–2
Slovan Bratislava (Czechoslovakia)	5–5 (a)	(Belgium) Anderlecht	4–2	1–3
Celtic (Scotland)	1–3	(Greece) Olympiacos	1–1	0–2
Feyenoord (Netherlands)	11–1	(Northern Ireland) Coleraine	7–0	4–1
VÖEST Linz (Austria)	0–5	(Spain) Barcelona	0–0	0–5
Valletta (Malta)	2–4	(Finland) HJK	1–0	1–4
Universitatea Craiova (Romania)	3–4	(Sweden) Åtvidaberg	2–1	1–3

Byes: Bayern Munich (West Germany), Magdeburg (GDR), and Cork Celtic (Ireland, drawn against Omonia, who withdrew due to the Turkish invasion of Cyprus).

Italian club Lazio was disqualified before the draw.

=== First leg ===
18 September 1974

Hvidovre (Denmark)	0–0	(Poland) Ruch Chorzów
	Report

Hvidovre Stadion, Hvidovre
Attendance: 2,733
Referee: Adolf Prokop (East Germany)

18 September 1974

Jeunesse Esch (Luxembourg)	2–3	(Turkey) Fenerbahçe
Mond 56'; Giuliani 76'	Report	Arpacıoğlu 22'; Turan 48'; Konca 72'

Stade de la Frontière, Esch-sur-Alzette
Attendance: 6,719
Referee: Jacques van Melkebeeke (Belgium)

19 September 1974

Hajduk Split (Socialist Federal Republic of Yugoslavia)	7–1	(Iceland) Keflavík
Žungul 2', 52'; Oblak 32'; Šurjak 57'; Jerković 63'; Buljan 70'; Boljat 83'	Report	Jóhannsson 41'

Stari Plac, Split
Attendance: 13,005
Referee: Michalakis Kiriakides (Cyprus)

18 September 1974

Saint-Étienne (France)	2–0	(Portugal) Sporting CP
H. Revelli 15'; Bereta 58'	Report

Stade Geoffroy Guichard, Saint-Étienne
Attendance: 21,724
Referee: Walter Eschweiler (West Germany)

18 September 1974

Viking (Norway)	0–2	(Soviet Union) Ararat Yerevan
	Report	Markarov 51', 81'

Stavanger Stadion, Stavanger
Attendance: 10,642
Referee: Pat Partridge (England)

18 September 1974

Levski-Spartak (Bulgaria)	0–3	(Hungary) Újpesti Dózsa
	Report	Horváth 28'; Bene 58'; Dunai 76'

Georgi Asparuhov Stadium, Sofia
Attendance: 29,722
Referee: Michal Jursa (Czechoslovakia)

18 September 1974

Leeds United (England)	4–1	(Switzerland) FC Zürich
Clarke 15', 42'; Lorimer 25' (pen.); Jordan 48'	Report	Katić 89'

Elland Road, Leeds
Attendance: 20,012
Referee: Jan Keizer (Netherlands)

18 September 1974

Slovan Bratislava (Czechoslovakia)	4–2	(Belgium) Anderlecht
Novotný 1'; Masný 29', 44'; Švehlík 63'	Report	Coeck 48'; Van Himst 70'

Tehelné pole, Bratislava
Attendance: 11,327
Referee: Walter Hungerbühler (Switzerland)

18 September 1974

Celtic (Scotland)	1–1	(Greece) Olympiacos
Wilson 80'	Report	Persidis 16'

Celtic Park, Glasgow
Attendance: 36,828
Referee: Vital Loraux (Belgium)

18 September 1974

Feyenoord (Netherlands)	7–0	(Northern Ireland) Coleraine
Schoenmaker 23'; Kreuz 27', 82', 86'; Van Hanegem 35', 54'; Ressel 60'	Report

De Kuip, Rotterdam
Attendance: 17,483
Referee: Jacques Colling (Luxembourg)

18 September 1974

VÖEST Linz (Austria)	0–0	(Spain) Barcelona
	Report

Gugl-Oval, Linz
Attendance: 25,000
Referee: Gyula Emsberger (Hungary)

18 September 1974

Valletta (Malta)	1–0	(Finland) HJK
Magro 6'	Report

Empire Stadium, Gżira
Attendance: 8,612
Referee: Gianfranco Menegali (Italy)

18 September 1974

Universitatea Craiova (Romania)	2–1	(Sweden) Åtvidaberg
Oblemenco 15', 50' (pen.)	Report	Augustsson 6'

Stadionul Central, Craiova
Attendance: 20,000
Referee: Yuri Sergienko (Soviet Union)

=== Second leg ===
2 October 1974

Ruch Chorzów (Poland)	2–1	(Denmark) Hvidovre
Bula 34', 63'	Report	Pedersen 55'

Stadion Miejski w Chorzowie, Chorzów
Attendance: 7,744
Referee: Ertugrul Dilek (Turkey)

Ruch Chorzów won 2–1 on aggregate.

2 October 1974

Fenerbahçe (Turkey)	2–0	(Luxembourg) Jeunesse Esch
Turan 31' (pen.); Şen 69'	Report

İnönü Stadium, Istanbul
Attendance: 29,734
Referee: Constantin Petrea (Romania)

Fenerbahçe won 5–2 on aggregate.

24 September 1974

Keflavík (Iceland)	0–2	(Socialist Federal Republic of Yugoslavia) Hajduk Split
	Report	Džoni 4'; Mijač 52'

Stari Plac, Split
Attendance: 7,875
Referee: Theodoris Aspris (Cyprus)

Hajduk Split won 9–1 on aggregate.

2 October 1974

Sporting CP (Portugal)	1–1	(France) Saint-Étienne
Yazalde 37'	Report	Synaeghel 25'

Estádio José Alvalade, Lisbon
Attendance: 18,257
Referee: Jean Dubach (Switzerland)

Saint-Étienne won 3–1 on aggregate.

2 October 1974

Ararat Yerevan (Soviet Union)	4–2	(Norway) Viking
Markarov 29', 50', 59'; Bondarenko 83'	Report	Nilsen 41'; Berland 42'

Hrazdan Stadium, Yerevan
Attendance: 31,348
Referee: Adolf Mathias (Austria)

Ararat Yerevan won 6–2 on aggregate.

2 October 1974

Újpesti Dózsa (Hungary)	4–1	(Bulgaria) Levski-Spartak
Bene 13', 70'; Dunai 58', 65'	Report	Voynov 19'

Megyeri úti Stadion, Budapest
Attendance: 8,763
Referee: Gheorghi Bakanidze (Soviet Union)

Újpesti Dózsa won 7–1 on aggregate.

2 October 1974

FC Zürich (Switzerland)	2–1	(England) Leeds United
Katić 37'; Rutschmann 42' (pen.)	Report	Clarke 36'

Letzigrund, Zürich
Attendance: 13,382
Referee: Sergio Gonella (Italy)

Leeds United won 5–3 on aggregate.

2 October 1974

Anderlecht (Belgium)	3–1	(Czechoslovakia) Slovan Bratislava
Van Himst 10'; Coeck 12'; Thissen 89'	Report	Masný 54'

Stade Émile Versé, Anderlecht
Attendance: 32,487
Referee: Antonio Camacho Jiménez (Spain)

5–5 on aggregate; Anderlecht won on away goals.

2 October 1974

Olympiacos (Greece)	2–0	(Scotland) Celtic
Kritikopoulos 2'; Stavropoulos 24'	Report

Georgios Karaiskakis Stadium, Athens
Attendance: 41,000
Referee: Rudi Glöckner (East Germany)

Olympiacos won 3–1 on aggregate.

2 October 1974

Coleraine (Northern Ireland)	1–4	(Netherlands) Feyenoord
Simpson 65'	Report	Schoenmaker 27', 44', 66' (pen.); Kreuz 56'

The Showgrounds, Coleraine
Attendance: 2,565
Referee: Hannes Sigurðsson (Iceland)

Feyenoord won 11–1 on aggregate.

2 October 1974

Barcelona (Spain)	5–0	(Austria) VÖEST Linz
Asensi 22'; Clares 30', 33'; Juan Carlos 50'; Rexach 76' (pen.)	Report

Camp Nou, Barcelona
Attendance: 70,000
Referee: Michel Kitabdjian (France)

Barcelona won 5–0 on aggregate.

2 October 1974

HJK (Finland)	4–1	(Malta) Valletta
Rahja 8'; Peltoniemi 17'; Hämäläinen 37'; Forssell 81'	Report	Giglio 89'

Olympiastadion, Helsinki
Attendance: 1,647
Referee: Rolf Arnshed (Sweden)

HJK won 4–2 on aggregate.

3 October 1974

Åtvidaberg (Sweden)	3–1	(Romania) Universitatea Craiova
Andersson 19'; Almqvist 29'; Wallinder 87' (pen.)	Report	Bradin 40'

Kopparvallen, Åtvidaberg
Attendance: 3,234
Referee: Martti Hirviniemi (Finland)

Åtvidaberg won 4–3 on aggregate.

== Second round ==
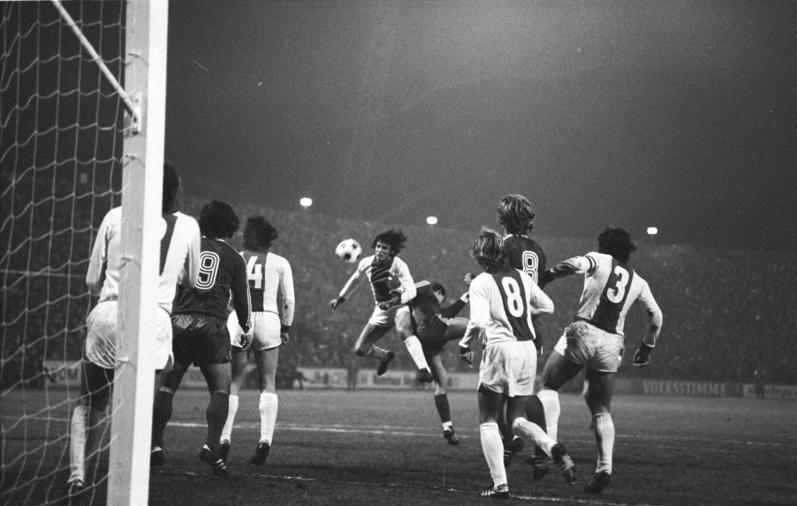
1. FC Magdeburg v. Bayern Munich

Team 1	Agg.	Team 2	1st leg	2nd leg
Ruch Chorzów (Poland)	4–1	(Turkey) Fenerbahçe	2–1	2–0
Hajduk Split (Socialist Federal Republic of Yugoslavia)	5–6	(France) Saint-Étienne	4–1	1–5
Bayern Munich (West Germany)	5–3	(East Germany) Magdeburg	3–2	2–1
Cork Celtic (Republic of Ireland)	1–7	(Soviet Union) Ararat Yerevan	1–2	0–5
Újpesti Dózsa (Hungary)	1–5	(England) Leeds United	1–2	0–3
Anderlecht (Belgium)	5–4	(Greece) Olympiacos	5–1	0–3
Feyenoord (Netherlands)	0–3	(Spain) Barcelona	0–0	0–3
HJK (Finland)	0–4	(Sweden) Åtvidaberg	0–3	0–1

=== First leg ===
23 October 1974

Ruch Chorzów (Poland)	2–1	(Turkey) Fenerbahçe
Kopicera 46'; Benigier 61'	Report	Gülseven 38'

Stadion Miejski w Chorzowie, Chorzów
Attendance: 10,368
Referee: Charles Corver (Netherlands)

23 October 1974

Hajduk Split (Socialist Federal Republic of Yugoslavia)	4–1	(France) Saint-Étienne
Jerković 29', 65'; Žungul 57'; Mijač 81'	Report	H. Revelli 35'

Stari plac, Split
Attendance: 15,527
Referee: Doğan Babacan (Turkey)

23 October 1974

Bayern Munich (West Germany)	3–2	(East Germany) Magdeburg
Müller 51' (pen.), 63'; Wunder 69'	Report	Hansen 1' (o.g.); Sparwasser 44'

Olympiastadion, Munich
Attendance: 63,349
Referee: Alberto Michelotti (Italy)

23 October 1974

Cork Celtic (Republic of Ireland)	1–2	(Soviet Union) Ararat Yerevan
Tambling 90'	Report	Zanazanyan 25'; Ghazaryan 65'

Flower Lodge, Cork
Attendance: 5,000
Referee: Ronald Jones (Wales)

23 October 1974

Újpesti Dózsa (Hungary)	1–2	(England) Leeds United
Fazekas 19' (pen.)	Report	Lorimer 7'; McQueen 22'

Népstadion, Budapest
Attendance: 24,389
Referee: Kurt Tschenscher (West Germany)

23 October 1974

Anderlecht (Belgium)	5–1	(Greece) Olympiacos
Rensenbrink 23', 33' (pen.), 59' (pen.); Van der Elst 25'; Ladinszky 70'	Report	Viera 28' (pen.)

Stade Émile Versé, Anderlecht
Attendance: 33,726
Referee: John Carpenter (Ireland)

22 October 1974

Feyenoord (Netherlands)	0–0	(Spain) Barcelona
	Report

De Kuip, Rotterdam
Attendance: 58,077
Referee: Rudi Glöckner (East Germany)

23 October 1974

HJK (Finland)	0–3	(Sweden) Åtvidaberg
	Report	Almqvist 15', 75'; Hasselberg 65'

Olympiastadion, Helsinki
Attendance: 668
Referee: Rolf Nyhus (Norway)

=== Second leg ===
6 November 1974

Fenerbahçe (Turkey)	0–2	(Poland) Ruch Chorzów
	Report	Kopicera 16'; Benigier 42'

İnönü Stadium, Istanbul
Attendance: 21,018
Referee: Anton Bucheli (Switzerland)

Ruch Chorzów won 4–1 on aggregate.

6 November 1974

Saint-Étienne (France)	5–1 (a.e.t.)	(Socialist Federal Republic of Yugoslavia) Hajduk Split
Larqué 36'; Bathenay 61'; Bereta 71' (pen.); Triantafyllos 82', 104'	Report	Jovanić 60'

Stade Geoffroy Guichard, Saint-Étienne
Attendance: 26,418
Referee: John Paterson (Scotland)

Saint-Étienne won 6–5 on aggregate.

6 November 1974

Magdeburg (East Germany)	1–2	(West Germany) Bayern Munich
Sparwasser 56'	Report	Müller 22', 55'

Ernst-Grube-Stadion, Magdeburg
Attendance: 33,734
Referee: Erich Linemayr (Austria)

Bayern Munich won 5–3 on aggregate.

6 November 1974

Ararat Yerevan (Soviet Union)	5–0	(Republic of Ireland) Cork Celtic
Poghosyan 29', 67'; Zanazanyan 54'; Ishtoyan 62'; Andreasyan 74'	Report

Hrazdan Stadium, Yerevan
Attendance: 23,000
Referee: Gheorge Limona (Romania)

Ararat Yerevan won 7–1 on aggregate.

6 November 1974

Leeds United (England)	3–0	(Hungary) Újpesti Dózsa
McQueen 28'; Bremner 46'; Yorath 65'	Report

Elland Road, Leeds
Attendance: 28,091
Referee: Alfred Delcourt (Belgium)

Leeds United won 5–1 on aggregate.

6 November 1974

Olympiacos (Greece)	3–0	(Belgium) Anderlecht
Galakos 18', 68', 82'	Report

Panachaiki Stadium, Patras
Attendance: 8,290
Referee: Károly Palotai (Hungary)

Anderlecht won 5–4 on aggregate.

5 November 1974

Barcelona (Spain)	3–0	(Netherlands) Feyenoord
Rexach 33', 39', 70'	Report

Camp Nou, Barcelona
Attendance: 39,475
Referee: Ken Burns (England)

Barcelona won 3–0 on aggregate.

6 November 1974

Åtvidaberg (Sweden)	1–0	(Finland) HJK
Almqvist 90'	Report

Kopparvallen, Åtvidaberg
Attendance: 1,664
Referee: Leonardus van der Kroft (Netherlands)

Åtvidaberg won 4–0 on aggregate.

== Quarter-finals ==
Team 1	Agg.	Team 2	1st leg	2nd leg
Ruch Chorzów (Poland)	3–4	(France) Saint-Étienne	3–2	0–2
Bayern Munich (West Germany)	2–1	(Soviet Union) Ararat Yerevan	2–0	0–1
Leeds United (England)	4–0	(Belgium) Anderlecht	3–0	1–0
Barcelona (Spain)	5–0	(Sweden) Åtvidaberg	2–0	3–0

=== First leg ===
5 March 1975

Ruch Chorzów (Poland)	3–2	(France) Saint-Étienne
Maszczyk 9'; Benigier 36'; Bula 46' (pen.)	Report	Larqué 64'; Triantafyllos 84'

Stadion Miejski w Chorzowie, Chorzów
Attendance: 26,710
Referee: Sergio Gonella (Italy)

5 March 1975

Bayern Munich (West Germany)	2–0	(Soviet Union) Ararat Yerevan
Hoeneß 78'; Torstensson 83'	Report

Olympiastadion, Munich
Attendance: 65,000
Referee: Milivoje Gugulović (Yugoslavia)

5 March 1975

Leeds United (England)	3–0	(Belgium) Anderlecht
Jordan 10'; McQueen 42'; Lorimer 89'	Report

Elland Road, Leeds
Attendance: 43,195
Referee: Rudi Glöckner (East Germany)

4 March 1975

Barcelona (Spain)	2–0	(Sweden) Åtvidaberg
Marinho 42'; Clares 81'	Report

Camp Nou, Barcelona
Attendance: 10,988
Referee: Dominic Byrne (Ireland)

=== Second leg ===
19 March 1975

Saint-Étienne (France)	2–0	(Poland) Ruch Chorzów
Janvion 3'; H. Revelli 84' (pen.)	Report

Stade Geoffroy Guichard, Saint-Étienne
Attendance: 37,904
Referee: Sándor Petri (Hungary)

Saint-Étienne won 4–3 on aggregate.

19 March 1975

Ararat Yerevan (Soviet Union)	1–0	(West Germany) Bayern Munich
Andreasyan 35'	Report

Hrazdan Stadium, Yerevan
Attendance: 70,400
Referee: Theodorus Boosten (Netherlands)

Bayern Munich won 2–1 on aggregate.

19 March 1975

Anderlecht (Belgium)	0–1	(England) Leeds United
	Report	Bremner 74'

Stade Émile Versé, Anderlecht
Attendance: 33,948
Referee: Paul Schiller (Austria)

Leeds United won 4–0 on aggregate.

11 March 1975

Åtvidaberg (Sweden)	0–3	(Spain) Barcelona
	Report	Olsson 28' (o.g.); Asensi 60'; Neeskens 70'

Camp Nou, Barcelona
Attendance: 4,444
Referee: Walter Hungerbühler (Switzerland)

Barcelona won 5–0 on aggregate.

== Semi-finals ==
Team 1	Agg.	Team 2	1st leg	2nd leg
Saint-Étienne (France)	0–2	(West Germany) Bayern Munich	0–0	0–2
Leeds United (England)	3–2	(Spain) Barcelona	2–1	1–1

=== First leg ===
9 April 1975

Saint-Étienne (France)	0–0	(West Germany) Bayern Munich
	Report

Stade Geoffroy Guichard, Saint-Étienne
Attendance: 35,210
Referee: Walter Hungerbühler (Switzerland)

9 April 1975

Leeds United (England)	2–1	(Spain) Barcelona
Bremner 9'; Clarke 78'	Report	Asensi 66'

Elland Road, Leeds
Attendance: 50,393
Referee: Vital Loraux (Belgium)

=== Second leg ===
23 April 1975

Bayern Munich (West Germany)	2–0	(France) Saint-Étienne
Beckenbauer 2'; Dürnberger 70'	Report

Olympiastadion, Munich
Attendance: 72,919
Referee: Charles Corver (Netherlands)

Bayern Munich won 2–0 on aggregate.

23 April 1975

Barcelona (Spain)	1–1	(England) Leeds United
Clares 69'	Report	Lorimer 7'

Camp Nou, Barcelona
Attendance: 100,000
Referee: Erich Linemayr (Austria)

Leeds United won 3–2 on aggregate.

== Final ==
28 May 1975

Bayern Munich (West Germany)	2–0	(England) Leeds United
Roth 71'; Müller 81'	Report MatchCentre

Parc des Princes, Paris
Attendance: 48,374
Referee: Michel Kitabdjian (France)

== Top scorers ==
The top scorers from the 1974–75 European Cup are as follows:

Rank	Name	Team	Goals
1	(Soviet Union) Eduard Markarov	(Soviet Union) Ararat Yerevan	5
1	(West Germany) Gerd Müller	(West Germany) Bayern Munich	5
3	(Sweden) Reine Almqvist	(Sweden) Åtvidaberg	4
3	(Spain) Manuel Clares	(Spain) Barcelona	4
3	(England) Allan Clarke	(England) Leeds United	4
3	(Austria) Wilhelm Kreuz	(Netherlands) Feyenoord	4
3	(Scotland) Peter Lorimer	(England) Leeds United	4
3	(Spain) Carles Rexach	(Spain) Barcelona	4
3	(Netherlands) Lex Schoenmaker	(Netherlands) Feyenoord	4
