= Sergei Boyko =

Russian footballer and coach

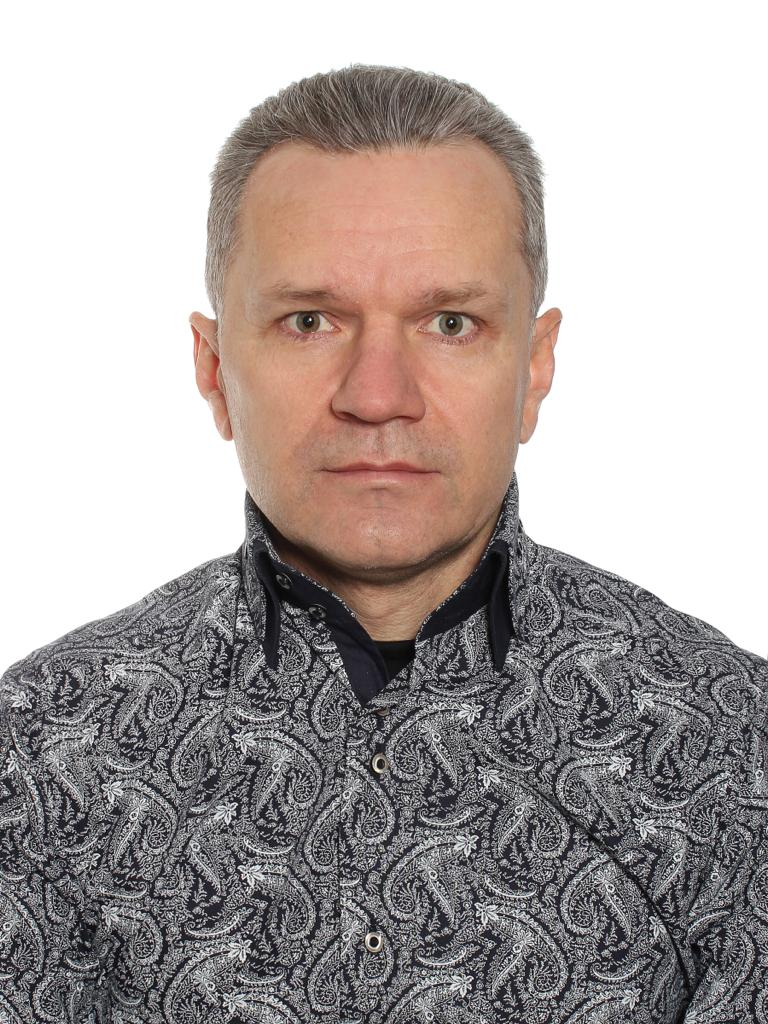

Personal information
- Full name: Sergei Sergeyevich Boyko
- Date of birth: 14 September 1971 (age 55)
- Place of birth: Kyiv Oblast, Ukrainian SSR
- Height: 1.76 m (5 ft 9 in)
- Position: Midfielder

Senior career*
Years	Team	Apps	(Gls)
1990–1991	Obuvshchik Lida	34	(6)
1993–1994	Lada Dimitrovgrad	32	(3)
1995	Nosta Novotroitsk	7	(0)
1996	Industriya Borovsk	36	(2)
1997	Podolye		
1997	Torpedo Minsk	19	(2)
1998	Slavia Mozyr	2	(0)
2000	Podolye		
2001–2002	Kolomna	24	(1)
2002–2003	Obninsk		
2003	Nara-Desna Naro-Fominsk		

Managerial career
- 2005: FC Nara-Desna Naro-Fominsk (administrator)
- 2006: FC Nara-Desna Naro-Fominsk (assistant)
- 2006: FC Nara-Desna Naro-Fominsk
- 2007: FC Torpedo-RG Moscow (assistant)
- 2008: FC Torpedo-RG Moscow
- 2009: FC Khimik Dzerzhinsk
- 2009: FC Znamya Truda Orekhovo-Zuyevo
- 2010: FC Znamya Truda Orekhovo-Zuyevo
- 2011: FC Zenit-Izhevsk Izhevsk
- 2011: FC Podolye Podolsky district
- 2013–2014: FC Vologda
- 2014–2016: FC Irtysh Omsk
- 2017–2018: FC Murom
- 2019: FC Ararat Yerevan
- 2021: FC Dinamo Tbilisi (conditioning)
- 2021–2022: FC Dynamo Vladivostok
- 2023–2024: PFC Dynamo Stavropol
- 2025: Spartak Anapa
- 2025: Rubin Yalta (caretaker)
- 2026–: Krylia Sovetov Samara (assistant)
- * Club domestic league appearances and goals

Sergei Sergeyevich Boyko (Russian: Серге́й Серге́евич Бойко; born 14 September 1971) is a Russian professional association football coach and a former player.

Boyko was born in a family of a Ukrainian father and a Russian mother.
