= Hrach Kaprielian =

Swiss-based Armenian businessman and philanthropist

- Հրաչ Կապրիէլեան
- Born: August 31, 1953 (age 72)
- Occupations: Chairman of the Board of Artsakhbank and President of FC Ararat Yerevan

Hrach Kaprielian (Armenian Հրաչ Կապրիէլեան, born 31 August 1953) is a Swiss-based Armenian businessman and philanthropist, known for serving as the chairman of the board of Artsakhbank, and the co-owner and former president of FC Ararat Yerevan, a football club based in Yerevan, Armenia.

He is also known for his philanthropic work in Armenia and the Republic of Artsakh, where he has funded humanitarian projects, agricultural ventures, and supported dozens of children as a godfather.

== Early life ==
Hrach Kaprielyan was born in 1953, in Istanbul , Turkey, to a family with deep Armenian roots. His family history traces back to the medieval Armenian capital of Ani and later to the Crimean Peninsula before returning to Anatolia. His ancestors lived in Kalecik, Ankara, until the events of the Armenian Genocide, which had a profound and lasting impact on the family.

Kaprielyan’s maternal grandfather, Jirair, was a respected jeweler in Varna, Bulgaria, known for his skill and integrity. His father, Geghmes Kaprielyan, was also a jeweler. From a young age, Kaprielyan was immersed in the world of precious metals and stones, beginning to trade talismans as early as age 13.

At the age of 18, Kaprielyan emigrated to the United States, settling in New Jersey with his grandparents.

== Career ==
=== Jewelry and watch businesses ===
In 1976, at age of 23, he had started his own jewelry business, moving from craftsmanship to design and entrepreneurship. In 1979, Kaprielian founded Kaprielian Enterprises, a jewellery manufacturing and design company.

Eventually, he took on an executive role in the luxury watch industry and became the General Director of Franck Muller USA, the American arm of the prestigious Swiss watchmaker.

By the time he turned 30, Kaprielyan had earned his first million dollars through his ventures in the luxury goods sector.

In 2001, he launched AWI (Armenian Watch International), an Armenian watch brand.

He has also helped setup watch manufacturing in Yerevan, Armenia for Franck Muller.

=== Return to Armenia and philanthropy ===
Following the 1988 Spitak earthquake, Kaprielyan returned to Armenia to provide aid. This marked the beginning of his long-term commitment to supporting the country’s recovery and development. Over the years, he has been involved in funding a range of projects, including construction firms, agricultural ventures, and financial institutions, notably Artsakhbank CJSC, an Armenian-based bank headquartered in Yerevan, Armenia.

Kaprielyan is also known as a former president of the FC Ararat Yerevan in Yerevan. His philanthropy includes personal sponsorship of more than 50 children and significant contributions to infrastructure and farming in both Armenia and Artsakh.

=== Personal life ===
Kaprielyan resides in Switzerland.
