= Ricardo Dionísio =

Portuguese football manager

Personal information
- Full name: Ricardo Nuno Pereira Dionísio
- Date of birth: 4 December 1982 (age 43)
- Place of birth: Arruda dos Vinhos, Portugal

Team information
- Current team: Ararat Yerevan (head coach)

Managerial career
- Years: Team
- 2005–2008: Benfica (youth)
- 2008–2009: Real Massamá (youth)
- 2019: Stade Nyonnais
- 2020: FC Sion (caretaker)
- 2023: Bahia (assistant)
- 2023–2024: Lausanne Ouchy
- 2026: Ararat Yerevan

Ricardo Nuno Pereira Dionísio (born 4 December 1982) is a Portuguese football coach, most recently the head coach of Armenian Premier League club Ararat Yerevan.

== Managerial career ==
Dionísio began his professional career in the under-13 seven-a-side football side of Sport Alenquer e Benfica. He later worked in the youth sides of Benfica and Real Massamá before becoming a fitness coach at Monsanto in 2009.

Dionísio continued to work as a fitness coach in the following years, working under João Alves at Swiss side Servette, and later with José Peseiro at Al Wahda, Al Ahly, Porto and Braga. He then worked under the same capacity with Oscar Londono at Stade Nyonnais during the 2017–18 season, before rejoining Peseiro's staff at Sporting CP in 2018.

Dionísio became a football manager with Stade Nyonnais in 2019, and signed a contract with FC Sion in the Swiss Super League on 1 January 2020, mainly as a caretaker. His spell ended on 1 June, as he was replaced by Paolo Tramezzani.

In 2021, Dionísio joined Renato Paiva's staff at Independiente del Valle in Ecuador, and followed him to Mexico's León and Brazil's Bahia, the latter one as his assistant.

He returned to the Swiss Super League in late 2023, as he was appointed head coach of FC Stade Lausanne Ouchy, who were promoted in the previous season, on 15 November 2023. Unfortunately, he was unable to improve SLO's results significantly and the club was relegated at the end of the season in last place. He remained on as manager in the Swiss Challenge League. However, after a poor start of the season, he departed the club on 25 September 2024 by mutual consent. In his time at SLO, he managed only an average of 0.8 points per game over 35 games.

On 18 January 2026, he was announced as the new Head Coach of Armenian Premier League club Ararat Yerevan. On 25 June 2026, Ararat announced that Dionísio had left his position as Head Coach.
