= FC Ararat Yerevan =

Association football club in Armenia

Ararat Yerevan
- Full name: Football Club Ararat
- Nickname: The White Eagles
- Founded: 10 May 1935; 91 years ago
- Ground: Vazgen Sargsyan Republican Stadium
- Capacity: 14,403
- Owner(s): Vartan Sirmakes & Hrach Kaprielian
- President: Hrach Kaprielian
- Manager: Ricardo Dionísio
- League: Armenian Premier League
- 2025–26: Armenian Premier League, 9th of 10
- Website: fcararat.am
Home colours	Away colours	Third colours

Football Club Ararat Yerevan (Armenian: Ֆուտբոլային Ակումբ Արարատ Երևան), commonly known as Ararat Yerevan, is an Armenian professional football club based in Yerevan that plays in the Armenian Premier League.

Since 1999 the club has been owned by the Swiss-Armenian businessman Vartan Sirmakes. The badge shows a white eagle standing on a football and is a reference to the club nickname. The badge also displays the name of Ararat in both Latin (Ararat) and Armenian (ԱՐԱՐԱՏ) text.

== History ==
In 1935, a football team was established in Yerevan by Spartak sports society. The first time the team participated in the competitions of the national level. The first trophy of the club was the Armenian SSR Cup in 1940. In the next four years football was not played because of World War II.

In 1944, games of USSR Cup were resumed, and Spartak participated. A match was set up with their main rivals, fellow FC Dinamo Tbilisi. However, the match was not played through the fault of Yerevan. In 1947, the team becomes silver medalist in the second league of the Transcaucasian region. The team finished just one point behind the ODL from Tbilisi. In this championship, Spartak, in a home match against Tbilisi Wings of the Soviets, showed the best result at the time, beating them by the score 7:1. In Season 1948 Spartak was to start in the first group (the Premier League at the time), but after 30 games along with 15 other clubs had been withdrawn. All 16 clubs have continued to participate in the league below. Spartak have spent the next season in the second group, improved their performance and won the competition in the South Zone. The team won 13 matches out of 18. However, the first place in the zonal group did not guarantee promotion. According to the regulations of the USSR Championship, the winners of zones in the second league should have played each other in the final stage. At this stage, 6 teams participated. Games between the teams went into a circle. After 5 games Spartak has settled on the third place, which ensured the club a place in the first group.

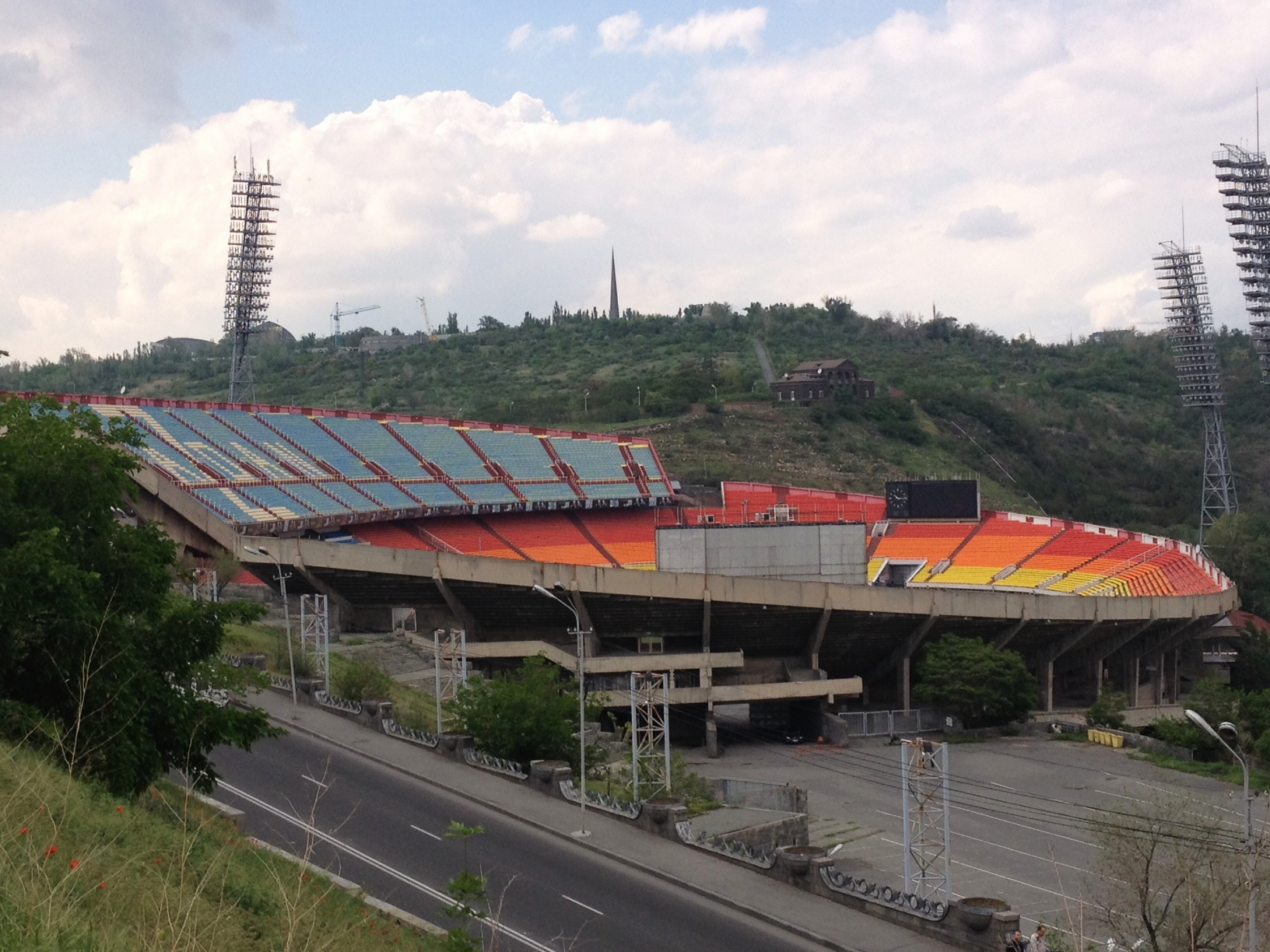
Hrazdan Stadium, the home ground of Ararat Yerevan between 1971 and 2015

In 1949 at Spartak participated for the first time in the Soviet Top League. The team performed poorly, finishing 12th. In the first two rounds the team lost, but in the 3rd round victory was recorded in a home game against the Air Force (Moscow). To beat the team was able representatives of the second half of the table, and twice on the road. There were three major defeats: the double-0–6 from Moscow Lokomotiv and CDKA, and once 1–6 – from Tbilisi "Dynamo". However, despite the poor performance, the club remained in the top league for next season, as the latter two dropped out of the club, ranked 17th and 18th place in the standings. Cup battles ended at the first stage, against the Dynamo "from Stalinabad. In 1950 season, Spartak began to act more liberated. The first lesion was detected only in the fourth round of the Leningrad "Zenit". The team scored 31 points with team-mates from Kiev, but on goal difference in the Class "B" sunk Spartak. In the Soviet Cup team started with a 1/128 final. Having weak rivals in 1/16-oy stumbled on rivals in the face Dynamo Kiev. In the hard game, which was held in Kiev, Spartak celebrated victory 3–2. In 1/8 final meeting with "Dynamo," Moscow and lost with a score of 0–7.

Between 1960–63 and later in 1966–91, the team participated in the Soviet Top League. In 1973, Ararat won the Top League as well as the Soviet Cup. In 1971 and 1976 (spring) seasons, they were runner-up at the top league, and in 1975 they won the Soviet Cup for the 2nd time.

In total the team participated in 33 Soviet Top League seasons, playing 1,026 matches, of which they won 352, drew 280, lost 394, scored 1,150 goals and conceded 1,306. By 1975 the team participated in the lottery three European Cups. In the last USSR Championship in 1991, the team was finished in seventh place.

=== Soviet championships ===
FC Ararat logo during the Soviet era

By 1945–47, Ararat swept the Armenian SSR League and by 1949 had won promotion into the Soviet Top League. The team played in the Top League in 1949–50, 1960–63, and 1965–91. In 1971, Ararat finished second in the Top League. In 1973, they won the Top League and the Soviet Cup (in a memorable final game against Dynamo Kyiv). They won the cup again in 1975. In 1971 and 1976 Spring (there were two Soviet championships in 1976 — Spring and Autumn) they were the league runners-up. In 1974–75 Ararat competed in the European Cup, reaching the quarter-finals before losing to defending and eventual champions Bayern Munich 2–1 on aggregate (0–2 in Munich and 1–0 in Yerevan). Since their debut in the European tournaments in 1972, they have won 16 of their 36 matches with 4 draws.

Ararat in 1973 final	Ararat in 1975 final

=== Modern history ===
Since the 1991 dissolution of Soviet Union, Ararat has attained the Armenian Championship only once in 1993 and won four silver prizes (1997, 1999, 2000 and 2008) and one bronze prize (1994). In addition, the club has won the Armenian Cup five times (1993, 1994, 1995, 1997 and 2008) and were finalists in 2001 and 2007. They also were very close to taking the Armenian title in 2007, however the unexpected resignation of head coach Varuzhan Sukiasyan changed the atmosphere on the team and the club ended up in fourth place. In March 2008, former coach Varuzhan Sukiasyan returned to take charge of the team again. After failing to take the title from Pyunik in 2008, Varuzhan Sukiasyan left the club.

The club headquarters are located on Agatangeghos Street 2, Yerevan. The club's Dzoraghbyur Training Centre is located in the Dzoraghbyur village of Kotayk Province, at the eastern outskirts of Yerevan.

In August 2016, Arkady Andreasyan became the head coach. However, in August 2017, Albert Safaryan was appointed as a head coach, while Arkady Andreasyan became the club's sports director. As of 2018–2019 season, Abraham Khashmanyan is the head coach of the team.

On 16 July 2018, Ararat Yerevan released a statement against the naming of Ararat-Armenia.

On 29 July 2019, Sergei Bulatov resigned citing family circumstances, with Sergei Boyko being appointed as interim-manager the same day. On 16 September 2019, Boyko resigned with Gagik Simonyan being placed in interim charge. On 6 January 2020, Igor Kolyvanov was announced as the new manager of Ararat Yerevan. On 1 June 2022, Edgar Torosyan left his role as Head Coach after his contract expired, with Aram Voskanyan being announced as his replacement the same day.

=== Domestic history ===
Season	League									National Cup	Top goalscorer		Manager
Season	Division	Pos.	Pl.	W	D	L	GS	GA	P	National Cup	Name	League	Manager
1992	1st	4th	22	15	4	3	78	15	34	Second round	Vahe Yaghmuryan	38	A.Sarkisyan
1993	1st	1st	28	23	5	0	92	9	51	Winner	Vahe Yaghmuryan	20	A.Sarkisyan
1994	1st	3rd	28	21	5	2	109	21	47	Winner	Vahe Yaghmuryan	18	A.Sarkisyan
1995	1st	1st^{1}	10	6	2	2	34	11	20	Winner	Armen Shahgeldyan, Levon Stepanyan	7	S.Darbinyan
1995–96	1st	4th	22	12	3	7	58	28	39	Semi-final			S.Darbinyan / A.Andreasyan
1996–97	1st	2nd	22	17	1	4	54	18	52	Winner			A.Andreasyan
1997	1st	6th	18	7	6	5	32	21	27	Winner			A.Andreasyan
1998	1st	4th	26	10	5	11	40	40	35	Quarter-final			A.Andreasyan
1999	1st	2nd	32	22	6	4	63	21	72	Quarter-final			A.Andreasyan
2000	1st	2nd	28	18	5	5	50	23	59	Semi-final	Tigran Yesayan	17	A.Andreasyan
2001	1st	5th	22	13	3	6	42	22	42	Runner-Up			A.Andreasyan
2002	1st	5th	22	9	6	7	39	22	33	Quarter-final			A.Andreasyan
2003^{2}	1st	-											A.Andreasyan
2004	2nd	7th	30	16	1	13	83	50	49	Quarter-final			S.Arzumanyan
2005	2nd	2nd	24	18	2	4	72	18	56	Quarter-final			A.Khashmanyan
2006	1st	4th	28	15	4	9	48	35	49	Quarter-final			A.Khashmanyan / V.Sukiasyan
2007	1st	4th	28	15	4	9	49	42	49	Runner-Up	Marcos Pizzelli	22	V.Sukiasyan / D.Mijić
2008	1st	2nd	28	18	5	5	48	23	59	Winner	Marcos Pizzelli	17	D.Mijić / V.Sukiasyan
2009	1st	8th	28	2	8	18	20	54	14	Quarter-final			A.Kirakosyan / A.Andreasyan
2010	2nd	1st	24	17	4	3	50	19	55				T.Yesayan
2011	1st	8th	28	2	4	22	14	57	10	Quarter-final	Koren Veranyan, Ara Hakobyan	3	A.Andreasyan
2011-12	Only Cup competition was held									Quarter-final			
2012–13	1st	7th	42	9	6	27	27	70	33	Quarter-final	Tigran Voskanyan	5	A.Safaryan / A.Khashmanyan
2013–14	1st	4th	28	12	8	8	30	23	44	Quarter-final	Aleksandar Rakić	10	A.Khashmanyan
2014–15	1st	8th	28	3	4	21	28	69	13	Quarter-final	Aleksandar Rakić	10	D.Mijić / S.Darbinyan / S.Chakhalyan / A.Minasyan & V.Sukiasyan
2015–16	1st	5th	28	9	10	9	28	31	37	Quarter-final	Gevorg Nranyan, Bryan de la Fuente	5	V.Sukiasyan
2016–17	1st	6th	30	3	3	24	17	53	12	Quarter-final	Gegham Tumbaryan	3	A.Andreasyan
2017–18	1st	6th	30	5	6	19	33	55	21	Quarter-final	Andranik Kocharyan	9	A.Safaryan
2018–19	1st	9th	32	5	7	20	24	60	22	Quarter-final	Artem Simonyan	6	A.Stepanyan / A.Khashmanyan / T.Yesayan
2019–20	1st	6th	28	10	6	12	34	36	36	Second round	Denys Dedechko	6	S.Boyko / G.Simonyan
2020–21	1st	4th	28	11	7	6	34	18	40	Winner	Mory Kone; Uros Nenadovic	7	V.Bichakhchyan
2021–22	1st	4th	32	13	7	12	47	36	46	Semifinal	Serges Déblé	13	V.Bichakhchyan; E.Torosyan
2022–23	1st	6th	36	10	8	18	29	42	38	First Round	Razmik Hakobyan	7	E.Torosyan
2023–24	1st	6th	36	13	6	17	39	50	45	Second Round	Kassim Hadji	7	G.Simonyan; R.Nazaryan; T.Yesayan
2024–25	1st	8th	30	9	5	16	36	59	32	Second Round	Hyllarion Goore; Moussa Kante	6	T.Yesayan
2025–26	1st	9th	27	3	4	20	21	63	13	Quarter-final	Kalifala Doumbia	11	A.Safaryan; Dionísio

- Due to the 1995 season being a transitional season, there was no official winner of championship.
- Ararat Yerevan were expelled before start of the season..

== Ararat in Europe ==
As of match played 14 July 2022

Competition	GP	W	D	L	GF	GA
UEFA Champions League	6	5	0	1	14	5
UEFA Cup	14	5	2	7	15	21
UEFA Europa Conference League	6	1	3	2	10	12
UEFA Cup Winners' Cup	12	3	2	7	18	18
UEFA Intertoto Cup	6	3	0	3	6	9
Total	44	17	7	20	66	65

Season	Competition	Round	Opponent	Home	Away	Aggregate
1972–73	UEFA Cup	1/32	(Cyprus) EPA Larnaca	1–0	1–0	2–0
1972–73	UEFA Cup	1/16	(Switzerland) Grasshopper Zürich	4–2	3–1	7–3
1972–73	UEFA Cup	1/8	(Germany) Kaiserslautern	2–0	0–2	2–2 (4–5 p)
1974–75	UEFA European Cup	1/16	(Norway) Viking Stavanger	4–2	2–0	6–2
1974–75	UEFA European Cup	1/8	(Republic of Ireland) Cork Celtic	5–0	2–1	7–1
1974–75	UEFA European Cup	QF	(Germany) Bayern Munich	1–0	0–2	1–2
1975–76	UEFA Cup Winners' Cup	1/16	(Cyprus) Anorthosis Famagusta	9–0	1–1	10–1
1975–76	UEFA Cup Winners' Cup	1/8	(England) West Ham United	1–1	1–3	2–4
1994–95	UEFA Cup	1/16	(Bulgaria) CSKA Sofia	0–0	0–3	0–3
1995–96	UEFA Cup Winners' Cup	1/32	(Poland) GKS Katowice	2–0	0–2	2–2 (5–4 p)
1995–96	UEFA Cup Winners' Cup	1/16	(Russia) Dynamo Moscow	0–1	1–3	1–4
1997–98	UEFA Cup Winners' Cup	1/32	(Georgia (country)) Dinamo Batumi	0–2	3–0 (Note: Ararat Yerevan were awarded a 3–0 win in the qualifying round first leg after Dinamo Batumi were found guilty of fielding an ineligible player ― Sotogashvili. The match originally ended as a 4–2 win for Dinamo Batumi.)	3–2
1997–98	UEFA Cup Winners' Cup	1/16	(Denmark) Copenhagen	0–2	0–3	0–5
1999	UEFA Intertoto Cup	1/16	(Romania) Bacău	1–0	1–0	2–0
1999	UEFA Intertoto Cup	1/8	(Belgium) Sint-Truiden	0–2	1–3	1–5
2000–01	UEFA Cup	Q	(Slovakia) Košice	2–3	1–1	3–4
2001–02	UEFA Cup	Q	(Israel) Hapoel Tel Aviv	0–2	0–3	0–5
2007	UEFA Intertoto Cup	1R	(Belarus) Shakhtyor Soligorsk	2–0	1–4	3–4
2008–09	UEFA Cup	1Q	(Switzerland) Bellinzona	0–1	1–3	1–4
2021–22	UEFA Europa Conference League	1Q	(Hungary) Fehérvár	2–0	1–1	3–1
2021–22	UEFA Europa Conference League	2Q	(Poland) Śląsk Wrocław	2–4	3–3	5–7
2022–23	UEFA Europa Conference League	1Q	(North Macedonia) Shkëndija	2–2	0–2	2–4

- Biggest Win in UEFA Competition: 17 September 1975, Ararat 9–0 Anorthosis, in Yerevan
- Biggest Defeat in UEFA Competition: 23 June 2007, Shakhtyor 4–1 Ararat, in Soligorsk
- Club Appearances in UEFA Competition: 12
- Player with Most UEFA Appearances: (Soviet Union) Aleksei Abramian and (Soviet Union) Norik Mesropian – 16 appearances
- Top Scorer in UEFA Club Competitions: (Soviet Union) Eduard Markarov – 12 goals

== Youth academy ==
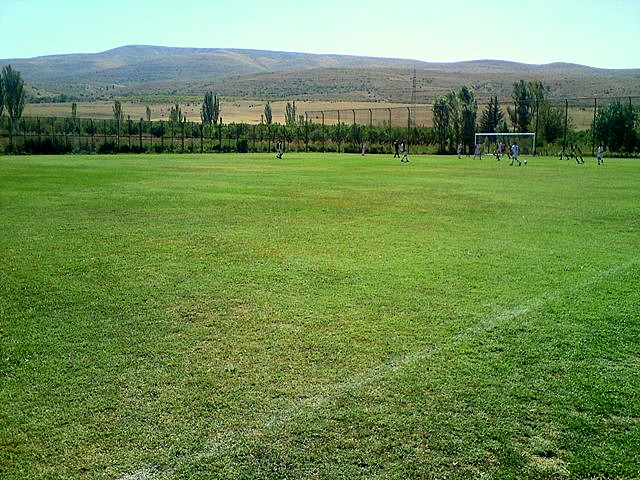
Dzoraghbyur Training Centre

Ararat Yerevan run their own youth training academy in the village of Dzoraghbyur at the eastern outskirts of the capital Yerevan. Occupying an area of 48,000 m^{2}, the centre was opened by the club in 2007. It is home to natural-grass as well as artificial-turf training pitches, in addition to an indoor training centre.

== Honours ==
- Soviet Top League (1):

1973

- Armenian Premier League (1):

1993

- Soviet First League (1):

1965

- Soviet Cup (2):

1973, 1975

- Armenian Cup (6):

1993, 1994, 1995, 1997, 2008, 2020–21

- Armenian Supercup (1):

2009

- IFA Shield (Note: Fourth oldest club competition, organized by the IFA (W.B.) and played between local clubs of West Bengal and other invited ones.) (1):

1978 (shared)

- European Cup

Quarter-finalist: 1974–75

- European Cup Winners' Cup

1/8 finalist: 1975–76

- UEFA Cup

1/8 finalist: 1972–73

== Current squad ==
As of 3 August 2026

Note: Flags indicate national team as defined under FIFA eligibility rules; some limited exceptions apply. Players may hold more than one non-FIFA nationality.

No.	Pos.	Nation	Player
1	GK	COM	Adel Anzimati-Aboudou
3	DF	ARM	Albert Khachumyan
4	DF	ARM	Volodya Samsonyan
6	MF	NGR	Okechukwu Precious Chukwu
7	FW	CMR	Patrick Victoire Handzongo
8	MF	ARM	Petros Alekyan
9	MF	ARM	Benik Hovhannisyan
10	MF	ARM	Artur Grigoryan
11	MF	ARM	Narek Alaverdyan
13	GK	RUS	Nikita Lobusov
14	DF	ARM	Arman Khachatryan
17	MF	ARM	Edgar Movsesyan
18	DF	MLI	Malick Aziz Berte
19	DF	MLI	Souleymane Touré

No.	Pos.	Nation	Player
20	FW	CIV	Adama Meite
21	MF	NGR	Ayomide Enialafia
22	FW	ARM	Aleksandr Ter-Tovmasyan
25	MF	CIV	Aboubacar Ouattara
32	DF	NGR	Divine Ukadike
33	DF	ARM	Varazdat Haroyan
38	MF	CIV	Moussa Kante
42	MF	CIV	Mohamed Lamin Fofana
55	DF	SEN	Guy Felix Lima
70	MF	ARM	Alen Mkrtchyan
71	GK	ARM	Andranik Martirosyan
77	MF	ARM	Aleksandr Aleksanyan
90	DF	NGR	Handsome Alexander
97	FW	ARM	Vardan Karapetyan

=== Out on loan ===
Note: Flags indicate national team as defined under FIFA eligibility rules; some limited exceptions apply. Players may hold more than one non-FIFA nationality.

No.	Pos.	Nation	Player

=== Technical staff ===
Position	Name
Head coach	(Portugal) Ricardo Dionísio
Assistant coach	(Armenia) Gevorg Poghosyan
Assistant coach	(Armenia) Rafael Safaryan
Goalkeepers coach	(Armenia) Erik Khachatryan
Head of Medical Service	(Armenia) Hrant Achjiyan
Physiotherapist	(Armenia) Karen Mkrtchyan, Gevorg Mkheyan and Aram Hakobyan
Team Manager	(Armenia) Arayik Yeghyan
Team Administrator	(Armenia) Roland Ohanyan

== Ararat Yerevan-2 ==
Ararat Yerevan-2
- Nickname: White Eagles
- Founded: 2007; 19 years ago
- Ground: Dzoraghbyur Training Centre, Dzoraghbyur
- Owner(s): Vartan Sirmakes & Hrach Kaprielian
- President: Hrach Kaprielian
- League: Armenian First League
- 2016–17: 3rd
- Website: http://www.fcararat.am/
Home colours	Away colours

Ararat Yerevan's reserve squad play as Ararat Yerevan-2 in the Armenian First League. They currently play their home games at the training field with artificial turf of the Dzoraghbyur Training Centre in Dzoraghbyur village near Yerevan.

Also FC Ararat-2 Yerevan played in 1990 Soviet Second League B and 1991 Soviet Second League.

== Personnel ==
=== Technical staff ===
Position	Name
Head coach	(Armenia) Vacant
Assistant coach	Vacant
Assistant coach	Vacant
Goalkeepers Coach	(Armenia) Levon Aslanyan
Physiotherapist	(Armenia)
Ararat Yerevan-2 Coach	(Armenia)

=== Management ===
Position	Name
Owners	(Armenia) (France) Vartan Sirmakes, (Armenia) (Switzerland) Hrach Kaprielian
President	(Armenia) (Switzerland) Hrach Kaprielian
Executive Officer	(Armenia) Artyom Hakobyan
Sporting director	(Armenia) Tigran Gharabaghtsyan
Press Secretary	(Armenia) Grigor Grigoryan

== Managerial history ==
Name	Nat	From	To
Vramshapuh Merangulyan	(Armenian Soviet Socialist Republic)	1935	1938
Suren Atanesyan	(Armenian Soviet Socialist Republic)	March 1939	Oct 1939
Yuri Yesenin	(Russian Soviet Federative Socialist Republic)	March 1940	Oct 1944
Viktor Andreev	(Russian Soviet Federative Socialist Republic)	March 1945	Oct 1945
Mikhail Sushkov	(Russian Soviet Federative Socialist Republic)	March 1946	Oct 1946
Viktor Grechishnikov	(Russian Soviet Federative Socialist Republic)	March 1947	Oct 1947
Hayk Andreasyan	(Armenian Soviet Socialist Republic)	March 1948	9 June 1949
Boris Apukhtin	(Russian Soviet Federative Socialist Republic)	June 1949	July 1949
Viktor Filipov	(Russian Soviet Federative Socialist Republic)	July 1949	Oct 1949
Gleb Ryabikov	(Russian Soviet Federative Socialist Republic)	March 1950	7 June 1951
Ilya Evranov	(Russian Soviet Federative Socialist Republic)	8 June 1951	Dec 1951
Hayk Andreasyan	(Armenian Soviet Socialist Republic)	March 1952	Oct 1954
Abraham Dangulov	(Russian Soviet Federative Socialist Republic)	March 1955	Oct 1956
Hayk Andreasyan	(Armenian Soviet Socialist Republic)	March 1957	Oct 1957
Boris Smyslov	(Russian Soviet Federative Socialist Republic)	March 1958	Oct 1960
Hayk Andreasyan	(Armenian Soviet Socialist Republic)	March 1961	July 1961
Anatoliy Akimov	(Russian Soviet Federative Socialist Republic)	Aug 1961	July 1962
Arutyun Kegeyan	(Armenian Soviet Socialist Republic)	Aug 1962	Dec 1962
Hayk Andreasyan	(Armenian Soviet Socialist Republic)	Jan 1963	28 September 1963
Alexander Abramov	(Russian Soviet Federative Socialist Republic)	2 October 1963	Dec 1963
Georgiy Zharkov	(Russian Soviet Federative Socialist Republic)	March 1964	Oct 1964
Artyom Falyan	(Armenian Soviet Socialist Republic)	1 March 1965	2 January 1968
Eduard Grigoryan	(Armenian Soviet Socialist Republic)	March 1968	Oct 1968
Oleksandr Ponomarov	(Ukrainian Soviet Socialist Republic)	March 1969	Oct 1970
Nikolay Glebov	(Russian Soviet Federative Socialist Republic)	March 1971	Oct 1972
Nikita Simonyan	(Armenian Soviet Socialist Republic)	1 January 1973	31 December 1974
Victor Maslov	(Russian Soviet Federative Socialist Republic)	March 1975	Oct 1975
Eduard Markarov	(Armenian Soviet Socialist Republic)	March 1976	Oct 1977
Nikolay Gulyayev	(Russian Soviet Federative Socialist Republic)	March 1978	July 1978
Leonid Zakharov	(Russian Soviet Federative Socialist Republic)	Aug 1978	Oct 1978
Yozhef Betsa	(Russian Soviet Federative Socialist Republic)	March 1979	Oct 1981
Arkady Andreasyan	(Armenian Soviet Socialist Republic)	March 1982	Oct 1983
Nikita Simonyan	(Armenian Soviet Socialist Republic)	1 January 1984	30 June 1985
Leonid Zakharov	(Russian Soviet Federative Socialist Republic)	June 1985	June 1986

Name	Nat	From	To
Arkady Andreasyan	(Armenian Soviet Socialist Republic)	July 1986	June 1989
Nikolay Kazaryan	(Armenian Soviet Socialist Republic)	July 1989	Oct 1989
Armen Sarkisyan	(Armenia)	March 1990	Oct 1994
Samvel Darbinyan	(Armenia)	March 1995	Oct 1995
Arkady Andreasyan	(Armenia)	Jan 1996	Nov 2003
Sevada Arzumanyan	(Armenia)	Nov 2003	Nov 2004
Abraham Khashmanyan	(Armenia)	Nov 2004	June 2006
Varuzhan Sukiasyan	(Armenia)	June 2006	July 2007
Dušan Mijić	(Bosnia and Herzegovina)	July 2007	March 2008
Varuzhan Sukiasyan	(Armenia)	March 2008	31 December 2008
Ashot Kirakosyan	(Armenia)	Dec 2008	March 2009
Arkady Andreasyan	(Armenia)	March 2009	Jan 2010
Tigran Yesayan	(Armenia)	Jan 2010	Dec 2010
Arkady Andreasyan	(Armenia)	Jan 2011	Feb 2012
Albert Safaryan	(Armenia)	Feb 2012	July 2012
Abraham Khashmanyan	(Armenia)	July 2012	26 April 2014
Dušan Mijić	(Bosnia and Herzegovina)	4 July 2014	26 September 2014
Samvel Darbinyan	(Armenia)	26 September 2014	1 December 2014
Suren Chakhalyan	(Armenia)	13 December 2014	14 April 2015
Varuzhan Sukiasyan	(Armenia)	28 April 2015	August 2016
Arkady Andreasyan	(Armenia)	August 2016	5 August 2017
Albert Safaryan	(Armenia)	6 August 2017	30 July 2018
Armen Stepanyan	(Russia)	30 July 2018	30 September 2018
Abraham Khashmanyan	(Armenia)	1 October 2018	12 April 2019
Tigran Yesayan	(Armenia)	19 April 2019	31 May 2019
Sergey Bulatov	(Russia)	1 July 2019	29 July 2019
Sergei Boyko (Interim)	(Russia)	29 July 2019	16 September 2019
Gagik Simonyan (Interim)	(Armenia)	16 September 2019	14 October 2019
Vadym Lazorenko	(Ukraine)	14 October 2019	28 December 2019
Igor Kolyvanov	(Russia)	6 January 2020	23 July 2020
Vardan Bichakhchyan	(Armenia)	23 July 2020	11 January 2022
Edgar Torosyan	(Armenia)	25 January 2022	1 June 2022
Aram Voskanyan	(Armenia)	1 June 2022	4 October 2022
Rafael Safaryan (Interim)	(Armenia)	4 October 2022	15 October 2022
Gagik Simonyan (Interim)	(Armenia)	16 October 2022	28 October 2022
Aleksandr Petrosyan	(Armenia)	29 October 2022	30 March 2023
Gagik Simonyan	(Armenia)	31 March 2023	12 December 2023
Tigran Yesayan	(Armenia)	19 February 2024	4 July 2025
Albert Safaryan	(Armenia)	4 July 2025	

== See also ==
- Football in Armenia
- Football Federation of Armenia
- The Invincibles (football)
