= Alyosha Abrahamyan =

Armenian footballer

Personal information
- Date of birth: 29 August 1945
- Place of birth: Gyumri, Armenia, Soviet Union
- Date of death: 26 August 2018 (aged 72)
- Place of death: Yerevan, Armenia
- Position: Goalkeeper

Senior career*
| Years | Team | Apps | (Gls) |
- FC Ararat Yerevan
- * Club domestic league appearances and goals

Alyosha Abrahamyan (Armenian: Ալյոշա Աբրահամյան; 29 August 1945 – 26 August 2018) was an Armenian footballer who played as a goalkeeper for FC Ararat Yerevan. He has been described as an Armenian football legend.

== Information ==
He began his career with Shirak SC in 1964. He then moved over to FC Ararat Yerevan from 1965 to 1968, where during the 1965 season, he was named best USSR rookie goalkeeper by Smena magazine. He played a single game for Shirak SC in 1969 then resumed play with FC Ararat Yerevan. He stayed with the club until 1978 then finished off his playing career with Shirak SC in 1979. He was part of Ararat's 1973 Soviet Top League championship, which was the only Armenian team to capture the Soviet championship and helped the club win the Soviet Cup in 1973 and 1975.

He became a coach after retirement and was a coach at clubs such as Shirak SC, FC Ararat Yerevan, FC Mika, and FC Urartu. He was also a referee from 1981 to 1987.

He was awarded the Armenian First Degree Medal for Services Rendered to the Homeland on October 10, 2013.

He became ill during the last few years of his life as he suffered a stroke and had to be operated on. He died on August 26, 2018.

== Personal life ==
His brother, Furman Abrahamyan, was also a professional football player and had played alongside his brother at FC Ararat Yerevan.
