= Eduard Markarov =

Soviet footballer (born 1942)

Personal information
- Full name: Eduard Artyomovich Markarov
- Date of birth: 20 June 1942 (age 84)
- Place of birth: Baku, Azerbaijan SSR
- Height: 1.64 m (5 ft 5 in)
- Position: Forward

Youth career
- 1954–1959: Lokomotiv Baku

Senior career*
Years	Team	Apps	(Gls)
1960	Torpedo Armavir		
1961–1970	Neftchi Baku	251	(88)
1971–1975	Ararat Yerevan	119	(41)
Total		370	(129)

International career
1961–1962	Soviet Union U-20		
1966–1968	Soviet Union	3	(0)

Managerial career
- 1976–1977: Ararat Yerevan
- 1984–1985: Ararat Yerevan (assistant)
- 1986–1991: Soviet Union U-21 (assistant)
- 1992: Malatia Yerevan
- 1992–1994: Armenia
- 1995–1996: Erebuni Yerevan
- 1998–1999: Homenmen Beirut
- 2000–2001: Mika Yerevan
- 2002: Mika Yerevan
- 2008: Kilikia Yerevan
- 2008–2010: Kilikia Yerevan (trainer-breeder)
- 2010–: Mika Yerevan (Vice-president)
- 2011: Mika Yerevan (acting coach)
- * Club domestic league appearances and goals

Eduard Artyomovich Markarov (Armenian: Էդուարդ Մարկարով, Russian: Эдуард Артёмович Маркаров, Azerbaijani: Eduard Artyomoviç Markarov, born on 20 June 1942) is a retired Soviet football player who played striker for clubs Torpedo Armavir, Neftchi Baku and Ararat Yerevan and for the Soviet Union national football team. In his career as a manager, his last team was the Armenian Premier League club Mika Yerevan.

He was a member of the Ararat Yerevan team that won the Soviet Top League in 1973 and the Soviet Cup in 1973 and 1975. Markarov scored 5 goals for Ararat Yerevan at the 1974–75 European Cup, sharing top goalscorer with Gerd Müller of Bayern Munich. He played three matches for the Soviet national squad and participated with the team at the 1966 FIFA World Cup, where they came in fourth place. As a manager, Markarov led Mika Yerevan to victory at the Armenian Cup in 2000 and 2001. Markarov was awarded the Master of Sport of the USSR title in 1963, the Honored Master of Sport of the USSR title in 1973 and the Honored Coach of the Armenian SSR title in 1983.

== Early life ==
Eduard Markarov was born in Baku, Azerbaijan SSR to a family of Armenians in Azerbaijan. Their family name is the Russified version of Margaryan. Markarov is ethnically Armenian. His father was Master of Sport of the USSR football player Artyom Markarov. Following in the footsteps of his father, Eduard took an interest in football and often played the sport with his brothers in their family yard. His father became his first coach. At age 14, he began to train in the youth club of Lokomotiv Baku.

== Club career ==
Markarov was personally invited by head coach Boris Arkadyev to play for his club Neftchi Baku in 1961. In the same year, Markarov was invited to the Soviet Union national under-20 football team. His forward partners in the club were Yuri Kuznetsov, Alakbar Mammadov, Adamas Golodets and Anatoliy Banishevskiy, whom all made up the main strikers of Neftchi. Despite the teamwork of the players, the national team rarely invited them, and even when they were invited, they almost never played together.

In 1971, Markarov moved to Ararat Yerevan. He had been receiving several injuries throughout the late 1960s, resulting in a change of clubs. Markarov had the most successful period of his career with this team. Ararat Yerevan won the 1973 Soviet Top League and the Soviet Cup in 1973 and 1975. These achievements are considered among the greatest milestones in the history of Armenian football to this day. Markarov played as one of the main strikers of Ararat during these years. In 1974, along with Gerd Muller was the top scorer of the European Cup.

In the 1974–75 European Cup, Markarov scored both goals in the 2-0 first victory over Viking and three of the goals in the 4-2 second victory. Ararat Yerevan advanced to the quarterfinals, where the team played two games against Bayern Munich, losing the first 0-2 and winning the second 1–0. Bayern moved on due to aggregate and went on to win the European Cup. Markarov's five goals tied him with Gerd Müller as the top goalscorer of the European Cup.

== International career ==
Markarov played for the Soviet Union national under-20 football team from 1961 to 1962. He played three matches for the Soviet Union national football team and was a member of the Soviet national squad that competed at the 1966 FIFA World Cup. The national team came in fourth place.

== Managerial career ==
His managing career started suddenly in 1976, hardly a year after he retired as a football player. Head coach Victor Maslov left Ararat Yerevan and Markarov, having more respect in the team, was asked to become the head coach. He accepted, officially becoming a football manager at 33 years of age. Markarov led Ararat to the 1976 Soviet Top League spring finals. Ararat Yerevan also made it to the 1976 Soviet Cup under Markarov's guidance. After the successful debut season, Markarov left the team to begin training children at the National Football School of the Armenian SSR. In 1979, he went to Algeria to teach at the Institute of Science and Sports. On his return, he joined the Ararat Yerevan coaching staff again for the 1984–85 season, as an assistant to Nikita Simonyan, who also coached Ararat when Markarov played for the team. He was an assistant coach for the Soviet Union national under-21 football team from 1986 until the collapse of the Soviet Union in 1991. The youth team won the 1990 UEFA European Under-21 Football Championship and came in third place in the 1991 FIFA World Youth Championship during Markarov's time on the staff. Markarov then went back to working with Armenian teams of the now independent Armenia. Markarov managed Malatia Yerevan for the first ever Armenian Premier League in 1992 and became the first ever manager of the Armenia national football team, leading the team from 1992 to 1994. He managed Erebuni Yerevan for the 1995–96 season. From 1995 to 1999, Markarov worked in Lebanon with the Lebanese Armenian club Homenmen Beirut, which won the Lebanese Elite Cup in 1999. Markarov was the manager of Mika Yerevan from 2000 to 2001, during which time they won the Armenian Cup in both 2000 and 2001. For the 2008 season, he worked as the head coach of Kilikia Yerevan [1]. Markarov improved the team results, but they did not rise up from last place. At the end of the year, Makarov voluntarily resigned and moved to the position of trainer-breeder of the club from 2008 to 2010. As of 2010, Markarov is the vice-president of coaching issues and director of the football school of club Mika Yerevan. Following the leave of head coach of Mika Armen Shahgeldyan from his position, it had been proposed that Markarov would fill the vacancy. Markarov worked as the acting head coach of Mika Yerevan from June to July 2011.

== Style of play ==
Markarov was known for his technical play and passing ability. As a forward, he was noted for his shooting accuracy and his ability to create scoring opportunities.

== Career statistics ==
=== Club ===
Club	Season	League		Cup		Europe		Super Cup		Total	
Club	Season	Apps	Goals	Apps	Goals	Apps	Goals	Apps	Goals	Apps	Goals
Neftchi Baku	1961	11	1	1	0	0	0	0	0	11	1
Neftchi Baku	1962	30	16	1	0	0	0	0	0	31	16
Neftchi Baku	1963	37	12	1	0	0	0	0	0	38	12
Neftchi Baku	1964	27	8	1	0	0	0	0	0	28	8
Neftchi Baku	1965	31	10	0	0	0	0	0	0	31	10
Neftchi Baku	1966	26	12	0	0	0	0	0	0	26	12
Neftchi Baku	1967	31	14	5	3	0	0	0	0	36	17
Neftchi Baku	1968	25	7	4	3	0	0	0	0	29	10
Neftchi Baku	1969	14	5	4	3	0	0	0	0	14	5
Neftchi Baku	1970	19	3	5	2	0	0	0	0	24	5
Total		251	88	18	8	0	0	0	0	269	96
Ararat Yerevan	1971	25	14	4	1	0	0	0	0	29	15
Ararat Yerevan	1972	22	2	2	0	4	2	0	0	28	4
Ararat Yerevan	1973	24	10	8	5	0	0	0	0	32	15
Ararat Yerevan	1974	21	5	5	2	3	5	0	0	29	12
Ararat Yerevan	1975	27	10	5	2	6	5	0	0	38	17
Total		119	41	24	10	13	12	0	0	156	63
Career Totals		370	129	42	18	13	12	0	0	425	159

== Honours ==
=== Club ===
==== Player ====
Ararat Yerevan

- Soviet Top League: 1973
- Soviet Top League runner-up: 1971
- Soviet Cup: 1973, 1975

==== Manager ====
Ararat Yerevan

- Soviet Top League runner-up: 1976 (spring)
- Soviet Cup runner-up: 1976

Homenmen Beirut

- Lebanese Elite Cup: 1999

Mika Yerevan

- Armenian Cup: 2000, 2001

=== Country ===
Player

Soviet Union

- FIFA World Cup (1): 1966 4th place

Manager

Soviet Union U-21

- UEFA Euro U-21 (1): 1990
- FIFA U-20 World Cup (1): 1991 3rd place

=== Individual ===
- Grigory Fedotov club member - 159 goals
- European Cup Top Goalscorer (1): 1974–75
- Best 33 players of the Soviet Top League season: No. 2 - 1973; No. 3 - 1971, 1975
- Honorary Citizen of the City of Fresno
- Honorary Citizen of the City of Jerusalem
- Order For Merit to the Fatherland
