= Albert Safaryan =

Armenian actor

Albert Safaryan / Ալբերտ Սաֆարյան
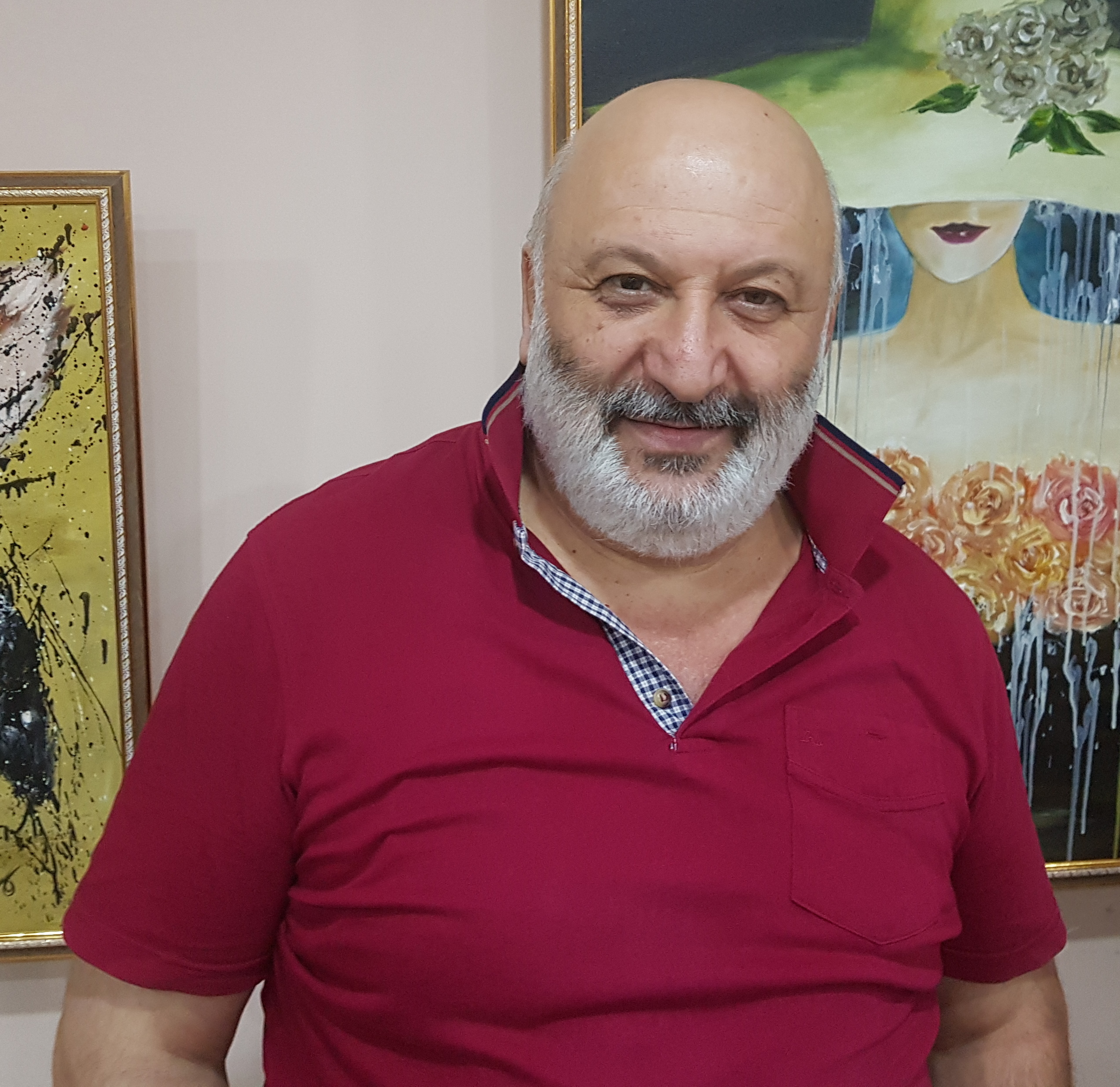
- Albert Safaryan in 2021
- Born: Albert Anushavan Safaryan; August 1, 1963 (age 62); Tbilisi, Georgian SSR, Soviet Union
- Occupation: Actor
- Years active: 1991–present

Albert Anushavani Safaryan (Armenian: Ալբերտ Անուշավանի Սաֆարյան; born August 1, 1963), is an Armenian actor. He is an honored artist of Armenia since 2013.
