= Arthur Minasyan (footballer, born 1977) =

Armenian footballer and manager

Personal information
- Full name: Arthur Hranti Minasyan
- Date of birth: 4 June 1977 (age 49)
- Place of birth: Yerevan, Armenian SSR, Soviet Union
- Height: 1.73 m (5 ft 8 in)
- Position: Midfielder

Senior career*
Years	Team	Apps	(Gls)
1998	Ararat Yerevan		
1998–1999	Lausanne-Sport	2	(0)
1999–2010	Ararat Yerevan	174+	(11+)
2003	→ Ararat Tehran (loan)		
2010	Resovia Rzeszów	6	(0)
2010–2013	Ararat Yerevan	53	(1)
Total		235+	(12+)

International career
2006–2008	Armenia	5	(0)

Managerial career
- 2013–2016: Ararat Yerevan (sporting director)
- 2015: Ararat Yerevan (caretaker)
- 2020–: Dilijan (assistant)
- * Club domestic league appearances and goals

Arthur Hranti Minasyan (Armenian: Արթուր Հրանտի Մինասյան, Russian: Артур Грантович Минасян; born 4 June 1977) is an Armenian professional football manager and former player who played as a midfielder and made five appearances for the Armenia national team. He played the majority of his career at Ararat Yerevan between 1998 and 2013, only leaving for three short stints with teams in Switzerland, Iran and Poland.

== Career ==
Minasyan made his international debut for Armenia on 11 October 2006 in a UEFA Euro 2008 qualifying match against Serbia, which ended in a 0–3 away loss. He made five appearances in total for Armenia, earning his final cap on 1 June 2008 in a friendly match against Greece, which ended in a 0–0 draw.

== Career statistics ==
=== International ===
Armenia
Year	Apps	Goals
2006	1	0
2007	2	0
2008	2	0
Total	5	0

== Honours ==
Ararat Yerevan

- Armenian Cup: 2008
- Armenian Supercup: 2009
