= Samvel Darbinyan =

Armenian football coach

Personal information
- Full name: Samvel Darbinyan
- Date of birth: January 1, 1952 (age 74)
- Place of birth: Yerevan, Armenia

Managerial career
- Years: Team
- 1992–1994: Homenmen-Skif Yerevan
- 1995–1995: Ararat Yerevan
- 1995–1996: Armenia
- 1996–1998: FC Yerevan
- 1999–2000: Kilikia Yerevan
- 2001–2002: Pyunik Yerevan
- 2002–2003: Zob Ahan
- 2004–2006: Kilikia Yerevan
- 2006–2008: Paykan Tehran
- 2009–2011: Mika Yerevan
- 2011–2012: Saipa Shomal (Assistant)
- 2012–2014: Giti Pasand
- 2014: Ararat Yerevan

Samvel Darbinyan (Armenian: Սամվել Դարբինյան) is an Armenian football coach who is currently the manager of Ararat Yerevan.
