= FC Vologda =

- Full name: Football Club Vologda
- Founded: 2010
- Dissolved: 2014
- Ground: Dynamo Stadium
- Capacity: 10,000
- Chairman: Igor Sidorov
- Manager: Sergei Boyko
- League: N/A
- 2013–14: Russian Professional Football League, Zone West, 16th

FC Vologda (Russian: «ФК Вологда») was a Russian football team from Vologda in Northwest Russia. It played professionally in the Russian Professional Football League from 2012 to 2013/14 season, after which it was dissolved due to financial issues.
