= Gagik Simonyan =

Armenian footballer and manager

Personal information
- Full name: Gagik Simonyan
- Date of birth: 21 August 1971 (age 55)
- Place of birth: Yerevan, Soviet Union
- Height: 1.71 m (5 ft 7 in)
- Position: Midfielder

Senior career*
Years	Team	Apps	(Gls)
2006–2007	Ararat Yerevan	26	(4)
2007–2008	Ulisses	20	(1)

International career
2001	Armenia	1	(0)

Managerial career
- 2010–2013: Impuls B (assistant)
- 2014: Ulisses (assistant)
- 2014–2015: Ulisses
- 2015: Ulisses (assistant)
- 2015–2016: Ulisses
- 2019: Ararat Yerevan (caretaker)
- 2019–2020: Ararat Armenia (assistant)
- 2022: West Armenia
- 2022: Ararat Yerevan (caretaker)
- * Club domestic league appearances and goals

Gagik Simonyan (Armenian: Գագիկ Սիմոնյան, born 21 August 1971), is a retired Armenian football midfielder and current manager. He has also 1 appearance for Armenia national team as a substitute in an away match against Wales.

== Coaching career ==
2011–2013 - assistant coach of Alashkert FC, 2013–2014 - assistant coach of Ulisses FC, 2014–2015 - interim coach of Ulisses FC, since 2015 - Head coach of Alashkert FC.

== Arrest ==
On 12 January 2016 Simonyan was arrested by the National Security Service of Armenia along with administrator, assistant coach and one of footballers of the club. He was accused of illegal betting.
