= Abraham Khashmanyan =

Armenian footballer (born 1967)

Personal information
- Date of birth: 11 November 1967 (age 58)
- Place of birth: Yerevan, Armenian SSR
- Height: 1.74 m (5 ft 9 in)
- Position: Midfielder

Senior career*
Years	Team	Apps	(Gls)
1984–1990	Ararat Yerevan	60	(2)
1991–1992	Kotayk	40	(5)
1992–1993	Shirak	35	(19)
1994	Homenetmen	21	(12)
1994–1996	Homenetmen Beirut	?	(?)
1997–1998	FC Yerevan	10	(0)
1999	Erebuni FC	27	(5)
2000–2001	FC Mika	32	(4)

Managerial career
- 2008–2010: Kilikia
- 2010–2012: Gandzasar
- 2012–2014: Ararat Yerevan
- 2013: Armenia U19
- 2013–2014: Armenia U21
- 2014–2018: Alashkert
- 2018–2019: Ararat Yerevan
- 2019: Alashkert
- 2019–2020: Armenia
- 2021: Alashkert
- * Club domestic league appearances and goals

Abraham Khashmanyan (Armenian: Աբրահամ Խաշմանյան; born 11 November 1967) is an Armenian football manager and former player.

== Honours ==
Alashkert

- Armenian Premier League 2015–16, 2016–17
- Armenian Cup: 2018–19
- Armenian Supercup: 2016–17
