= Dušan Mijić =

Serbian football executive, manager and player

Personal information
- Full name: Dušan Mijić
- Date of birth: 23 January 1965 (age 61)
- Place of birth: Banja Luka, SR Bosnia and Herzegovina, SFR Yugoslavia
- Height: 1.76 m (5 ft 9 in)
- Position: Defender

Youth career
- Hajduk Kula

Senior career*
Years	Team	Apps	(Gls)
1982–1991	Vojvodina	148	(4)
1991–1992	Espanyol	9	(0)
1992–1993	Palamós	33	(1)
1994	Spartak Subotica	7	(0)
1994–1995	Kavala	2	(1)
Total		199	(6)

International career
1983	Yugoslavia U18	5	(2)

Managerial career
- 2007: Ararat Yerevan
- 2010–2011: Veternik
- 2011–2012: Veternik
- 2014: Ararat Yerevan
- * Club domestic league appearances and goals

Dušan Mijić (Serbian Cyrillic: Душан Мијић; born 23 January 1965) is a Serbian football executive and former manager and player.

== Club career ==
After starting out at Hajduk Kula, Mijić joined Vojvodina in 1982. He was a member of the team that won the Yugoslav First League in the 1988–89 season. Later on, Mijić spent some time abroad in Spain, having stints with Espanyol and Palamós.

== International career ==
At international level, Mijić represented Yugoslavia at the 1983 UEFA European Under-18 Championship.

== Post-playing career ==
After hanging up his boots, Mijić served as manager of Armenian Premier League club Ararat Yerevan on two occasions (2007 and 2014).

In December 2016, Mijić was named the president of Vojvodina. He stepped down in September 2017.

== Honours ==
Vojvodina

- Yugoslav First League: 1988–89
- Yugoslav Second League: 1986–87
