= 1973 Soviet Top League =

36th season of top-tier football league in Soviet Union

Soviet Top League
- Season: 1973

Statistics of Soviet Top League for the 1973 season.

== Overview ==
It was contested by 16 teams, and Ararat Yerevan won the championship.

== League standings ==
Pos	Team	Pld	W	PKW	PKL	L	GF	GA	GD	Pts	Qualification or relegation
1	(Armenian Soviet Socialist Republic) Ararat Yerevan (C)	30	18	3	4	5	52	26	+26	39	Qualification for European Cup first round
2	(Ukrainian Soviet Socialist Republic) Dynamo Kyiv	30	16	4	4	6	44	23	+21	36	Qualification for Cup Winners' Cup first round
3	(Russian Soviet Federative Socialist Republic) Dynamo Moscow	30	13	7	3	7	43	30	+13	33	Qualification for UEFA Cup first round
4	(Russian Soviet Federative Socialist Republic) Spartak Moscow	30	14	3	5	8	37	28	+9	31	Qualification for UEFA Cup first round
5	(Georgian Soviet Socialist Republic) Dinamo Tbilisi	30	13	5	2	10	42	33	+9	31	
6	(Ukrainian Soviet Socialist Republic) Shakhtar Donetsk	30	14	3	4	9	32	26	+6	31	
7	(Ukrainian Soviet Socialist Republic) Zarya Voroshilovgrad	30	14	1	5	10	38	26	+12	29	
8	(Ukrainian Soviet Socialist Republic) Dnipro Dnipropetrovsk	30	9	8	1	12	36	40	−4	26	
9	(Kazakh Soviet Socialist Republic) Kairat Alma-Ata	30	8	10	1	11	25	37	−12	26	
10	(Russian Soviet Federative Socialist Republic) CSKA Moscow	30	10	5	4	11	33	36	−3	25	
11	(Russian Soviet Federative Socialist Republic) Zenit Leningrad	30	9	3	9	9	33	35	−2	21	
12	(Uzbek Soviet Socialist Republic) Pakhtakor Tashkent	30	9	2	4	15	37	44	−7	20	
13	(Russian Soviet Federative Socialist Republic) Torpedo Moscow	30	9	1	7	13	28	37	−9	19	
14	(Ukrainian Soviet Socialist Republic) Karpaty Lviv	30	8	3	3	16	28	48	−20	19	
15	(Byelorussian Soviet Socialist Republic) Dinamo Minsk (R)	30	7	3	6	14	21	36	−15	17	Relegation to First League
16	(Russian Soviet Federative Socialist Republic) SKA Rostov-on-Don (R)	30	3	5	4	18	19	43	−24	11	Relegation to First League

Rules for classification: Drawn matches decided by penalties, the winners obtaining 1 point, the losers 0.
(C) Champion; (R) Relegated

== Results ==
Results in brackets indicate the results from penalty shoot-outs whenever games were drawn.

Home \ Away	ARA	CSK	DNI	DYK	DMN	DYN	DTB	KAI	KAR	PAK	SHA	SKA	SPA	TOR	ZAR	ZEN
Ararat Yerevan		1–0	1–0	3–1	2–1	1–1^{(3–5)}	3–0	4–0	3–0	4–0	3–0	2–2^{(4–5)}	3–1	1–3	1–1^{(4–3)}	3–2
CSKA Moscow	0–1		0–0^{(3–5)}	3–0	3–2	1–1^{(4–5)}	1–1^{(5–4)}	1–0	1–0	3–0	0–1	3–1	2–2^{(5–3)}	3–2	1–0	0–0^{(8–7)}
Dnipo Dnipropetrovsk	1–1^{(5–4)}	4–1		1–0	1–0	2–3	0–0^{(4–2)}	2–0	1–1^{(4–3)}	1–1^{(5–3)}	2–1	2–0	0–1	2–0	2–0	3–1
Dynamo Kyiv	3–1	1–0	5–2		4–0	3–0	2–1	3–1	1–0	3–0	2–1	1–1^{(7–8)}	1–1^{(3–2)}	0–0^{(5–3)}	1–0	2–0
Dinamo Minsk	1–0	1–1^{(5–3)}	2–0	0–0^{(4–5)}		2–1	0–1	1–0	1–1^{(4–5)}	0–1	0–0^{(8–9)}	1–1^{(5–4)}	0–1	1–0	1–2	0–0^{(4–5)}
Dynamo Moscow	0–1	3–0	1–0	2–2^{(5–4)}	1–1^{(5–4)}		4–1	1–1^{(3–4)}	2–0	1–1^{(6–5)}	2–0	2–0	0–0^{(5–3)}	1–1^{(4–5)}	2–1	1–1^{(5–4)}
Dinamo Tbilisi	0–0^{(4–3)}	3–1	2–0	0–1	4–0	0–3		3–0	3–0	4–0	0–0^{(6–5)}	2–0	1–0	4–2	1–1^{(4–3)}	1–1^{(6–5)}
Kairat Alma-Ata	1–4	1–1^{(4–3)}	2–2^{(4–5)}	0–0^{(5–3)}	1–0	1–0	1–0		2–1	1–1^{(5–4)}	2–0	0–0^{(5–4)}	1–2	1–1^{(4–3)}	1–1^{(4–3)}	0–0^{(5–2)}
Karpaty Lviv	3–0	0–9	3–2	0–0^{(4–5)}	1–0	3–5	1–3	0–1		2–1^{(5–4)}	0–1	1–0	3–2	1–0	0–2	2–2^{(4–5)}
Pakhtakor Tashkent	2–3	1–0	4–1	0–1	4–0	2–0	2–2^{(2–5)}	4–1	3–1		0–1	0–1	1–0	1–2	1–2	5–0
Shakhtar Donetsk	0–0^{(3–4)}	4–1	2–1	0–2	1–0	1–1^{(4–3)}	0–1	0–0^{(3–5)}	3–1	1–0		3–0	2–1	2–0	3–1	3–1
SKA Rostov-on-Don	0–2	0–1	2–2^{(6–5)}	1–1^{(10–9)}	1–2	0–1	2–3	1–2	0–1	1–1^{(4–5)}	0–0^{(2–4)}		1–1^{(6–5)}	0–1	1–0	2–0
Spartak Moscow	2–2^{(4–5)}	2–1	3–1	2–1	2–0	1–0	3–1	1–0	1–0	4–0	0–0^{(5–1)}	1–0		1–1^{(5–4)}	0–2	2–0
Torpedo Moscow	0–1	2–2^{(3–4)}	3–1	0–2	1–1^{(3–5)}	1–0	1–0	1–3	1–1^{(3–4)}	1–0	0–1	1–0	2–0		0–3	0–1
Zarya Voroshilovgrad	0–1	1–0	0–0^{(3–4)}	1–0	0–2	0–1	3–0	1–0	4–1	3–1	2–1	3–1	2–0	0–0^{(5–3)}		0–0^{(2–4)}
Zenit Leningrad	1–0	1–2	0–0^{(11–12)}	2–1	1–1^{(7–6)}	2–3	1–0	1–1^{(3–4)}	3–0	0–0^{(3–4)}	3–0	3–0	0–0^{(4–5)}	3–1	3–2	

Legend: Blue = home team win; Yellow = draw; Red = away team win.

== Top scorers ==
18 goals

- Oleg Blokhin (Dynamo Kyiv)

16 goals

- Anatoli Kozhemyakin (Dynamo Moscow)

13 goals

- Arkady Andreasyan (Ararat)

12 goals

- Berador Abduraimov (Pakhtakor)
- Aleksandr Piskaryov (Spartak Moscow)

11 goals

- Mikhail Bulgakov (Spartak Moscow)
- Givi Nodia (Dinamo Tbilisi)

10 goals

- Eduard Markarov (Ararat)
- Vitali Starukhin (Shakhtar)

9 goals

- Vladimir Dorofeyev (CSKA)
- Viktor Kuznetsov (Zorya)

== Attendances ==
No.	Club	Average
1	Ararat	56,867
2	Dynamo Kyiv	41,200
3	Shakhtar Donetsk	31,000
4	Zorya	27,800
5	Dinamo Tbilisi	25,467
6	Zenit	25,133
7	Karpaty	24,467
8	Paxtakor	24,333
9	Dinamo Minsk	22,200
10	Spartak Moscow	21,407
11	Dnipro	21,067
12	Dynamo Moscow	19,967
13	Kairat	19,467
14	Torpedo Moscow	19,100
15	PFC CSKA	18,533
16	Rostov-on-Don	12,900
