= Hrazdan Stadium =

Football stadium in Yerevan, Armenia

Hrazdan Stadium Հրազդան մարզադաշտ
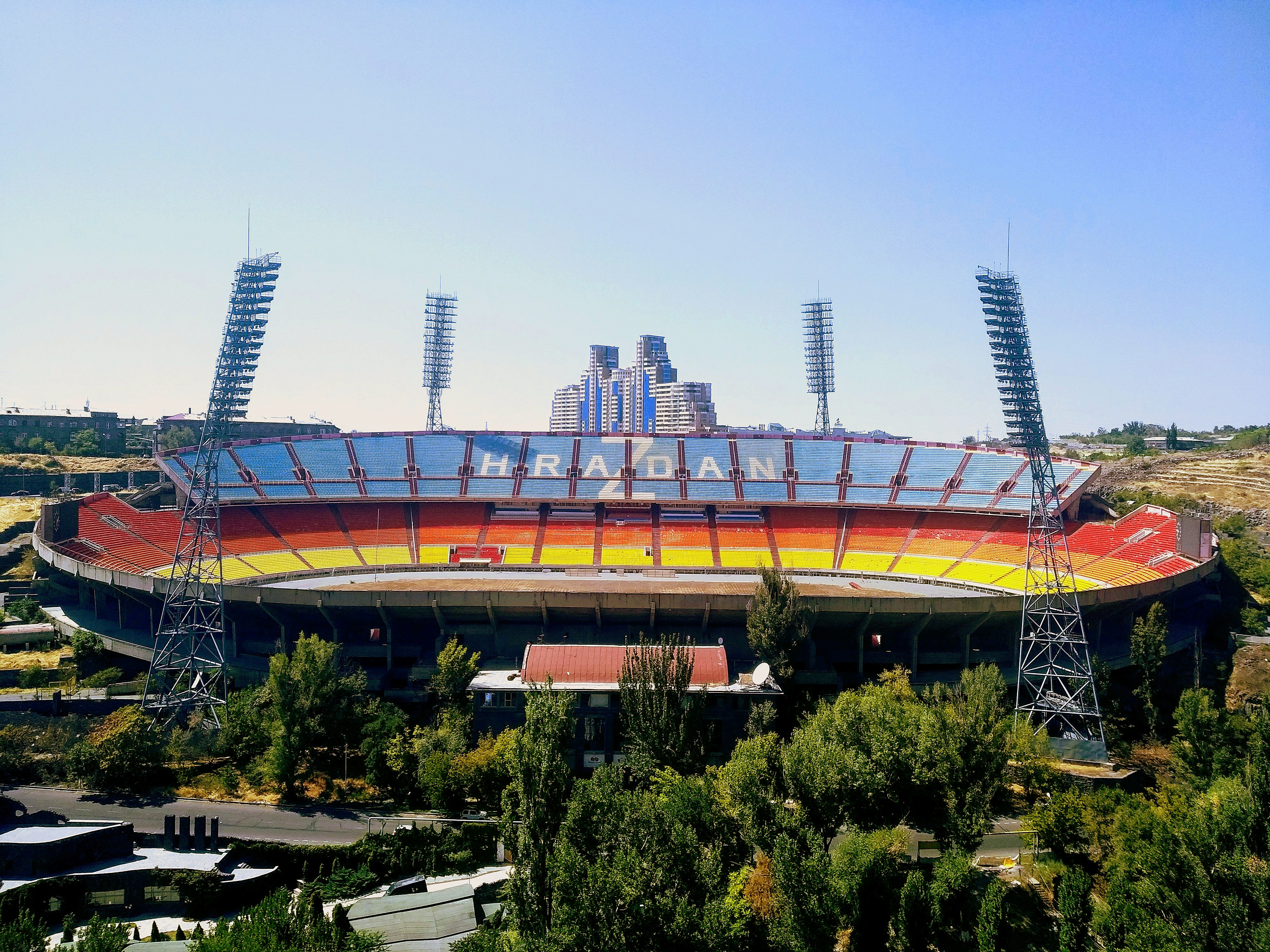
- Interactive map of Hrazdan Stadium; Հրազդան մարզադաշտ
- Location: Yerevan, Armenia
- Coordinates: 40°10′49.45″N 44°29′41.88″E
- Owner: Government of Armenia
- Operator: Hrazdan Central Stadium CJSC
- Capacity: 54,208
- Surface: Grass
- Scoreboard: Yes
- Record attendance: 78,000 (Ararat Yerevan 3-0 Kairat Almaty, 19 May 1971)
- Field size: 105 m × 68 m (344 ft × 223 ft)

Construction
- Built: 1969–70
- Opened: 29 November 1970
- Renovated: 2008, 2012
- Architects: Koryun Hakobyan, Gurgen Musheghyan
- Structural engineer: Edward Tossunian

Tenants
- FC Pyunik (1992–1998); Armenia national football team (1992–1999); FC Ararat Yerevan (1971–2015)

Hrazdan Stadium (Armenian: Հրազդան մարզադաշտ) is a multi-use, all-seater stadium in Yerevan, Armenia, opened in 1970. Being the largest sports venue in Armenia, Hrazdan was mostly used for football matches. It was the home stadium of the Armenia national football team until 1999 and has hosted the occasional international game since then. The stadium is able to host 54,208 spectators after the most recent reconstruction in 2008, which converted the stadium into an all-seater one. Before the reconstruction, Hrazdan was able to hold up to 70,000 spectators. It was among the top four stadiums of the Soviet Union by its capacity. The stadium hosted the Armenian Cup finals on many occasions, as well as the opening ceremony of the Pan-Armenian Games in 2003. The Soviet Union national team played two games, against Finland and Greece, in Hrazdan in 1978.

== History ==
=== Origin and construction ===
The idea of building a football stadium in the Hrazdan Gorge was first proposed by Soviet Armenian statesman Anastas Mikoyan during one of his visits to Yerevan during the Khrushchev Thaw. While staying at his residence overlooking the Hrazdan River, he observed a natural amphitheater in the gorge and proposed the construction of a football venue with a capacity of 20,000 seats.

However, the idea was not seriously pursued until 1967 when the leadership of Soviet Armenia launched a program to celebrate the 50th anniversary of Armenia's sovietization in 1970. A group of architects, led by former weightlifter Koryun Hakopyan and former fencer Gurgen Musheghyan proposed the construction plan of a football stadium in the Hrazdan Gorge, to host around 75,000 spectators.

A total amount of 5 million rubles was allocated for the project. The construction works were launched during the second half of 1969 and with the financial support of Calouste Gulbenkian Foundation, completed in a remarkable period of 18 months.

The construction process was highly supervised by the Communist leader Karen Demirchyan. Finally, the venue became ready in November 1970. The official opening of the stadium took place on 29 November 1970 with the presence of Leonid Brezhnev, celebrating the 50th anniversary of the Armenian SSR. However, the planned ceremony for the opening day was postponed due to heavy snow.

=== Architectural team ===
The history of the stadium is closely related with the history of Armenian football. The Stadium which was built in a record period of 18 months, is the first in the world that was built in a mountainous landscape.

The architects of the stadium were Koryun Hakobyan and Gurgen Musheghyan from Armenia. The construction process was supervised by engineer Edward Tossunian. The architectural group of the stadium was granted the award of the best construction of the year in 1971 and honoured by the Soviet Government.

== Significant games hostings ==
Hrazdan Stadium hosted its first official football match on 19 May 1971 when Ararat Yerevan defeated Kairat Almaty 3-0 in front of 78,000 spectators, with Alexandr Kovalenko (58th min), Oganes Zanazanyan (74th min. pen.) and Nikolai Kazaryan (77th min.) scoring for the hosts.

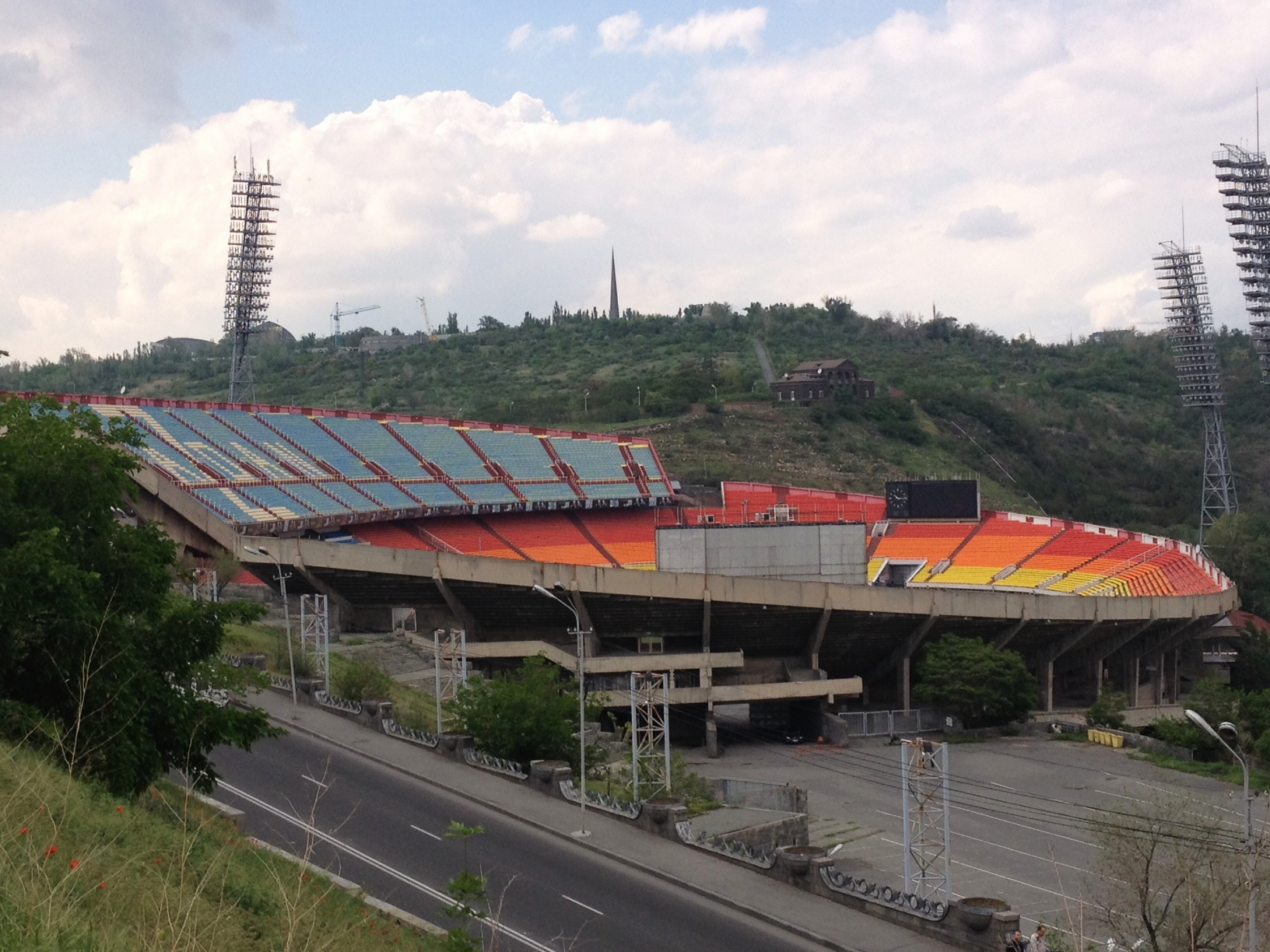
General view of the stadium

The stadium hosted some glorious moments of the Armenian football during Soviet era. The Armenians celebrated Ararat Yerevan's double of the Soviet football in 1973, which allowed them to play in the European Cup. Reaching the quarterfinals, they lost the first leg to the defending and future champions Bayern Munich with a result of 2-0 while they won the 2nd leg 1-0 in Hrazdan stadium in front of more than 70,000 spectators.

In 1985, Hrazdan was one of the venues of the FIFA World Youth Championship took place in the Soviet Union. It hosted the matches of the 1st group as well as a match during the quarter-finals.

After the independence of Armenia, the arena hosted the matches of the national team until 1999 when the smaller Republican Stadium in downtown Yerevan became its home ground. The largest number of spectators for the National team was recorded on 9 October 1996 in a 1998 World Cup qualification match against Germany. Attended by 42,000 fans, the match ended in a 5-1 win for Germany.

== Concerts ==
American rapper 50 Cent, along with French singer Zaz and British rock band Led Zeppelin performed concerts at Hrazdan Stadium during the summer of 2022 as part of the HAYA Festival. Later that same year, American singer Christina Aguilera was to perform in October, but the event was postponed by the HAYA Festival team due to the increasing tensions in the region.

American rapper Snoop Dogg was scheduled to perform at the stadium in September 2023, but the concert was cancelled by the Armenian government due to the sudden military offensive in Artsakh. His performance was instead replaced by American singer Jennifer Lopez, who performed at the Vazgen Sargsyan Republican Stadium in August 2025 as part of her Up All Night tour.

== Renovation ==
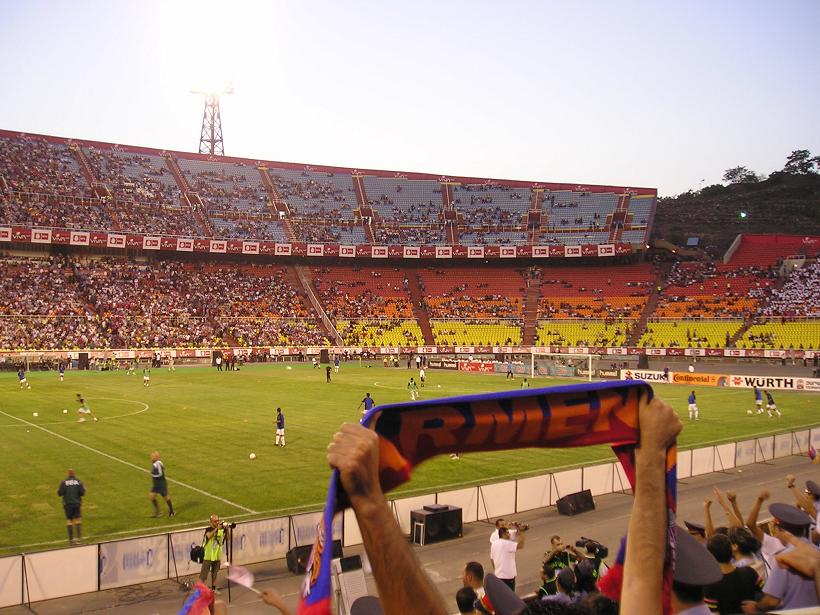
The stadium in 2008

In 2003 the stadium was privatized and sold to the Hrazdan Holding CJSC, who began to set up a renovation process in 2005. By the end of 2008 the stadium became all-seater.

Shortly after its renovation the Stadium hosted Armenia's match against Turkey on 6 September 2008, which was the first match Armenia had played at ground since a Euro 2000 qualifying match against France on 8 September 1999. The crucial match was attended by presidents Serzh Sargsyan and Abdullah Gul, with the presence of more than 30,000 spectators.

After the 2008 renovation, Hrazdan held UEFA three-star status until that rating was superseded by a new system of classification.

According to the president of Armenian Football Federation Ruben Hayrapetyan, a total of 6 million Euros will be spent for the modernization of the infrastructure, the pitch, the running track and the installation of a full-tribune cover for the stadium. After the upcoming renovation, the stadium will have an opportunity to bid as a host-venue for UEFA club competitions final matches. The renovation works began in March 2012. An estimated US$ 10 million was invested.

== Attendance records ==
=== Historical concerts ===
Soviet Superstar Alla Pugacheva performed at Hrazdan Stadium in 1984.The concert is considered one of the most famous events in the stadium’s history. Footage from the performance was included in the film I Came and I Speak ("Пришла и говорю"). According to Pugacheva’s recollections, the concert in Yerevan was especially meaningful to her, and she later said that she often rewatched recordings of the performance. According to various publications, three concerts from the “I Came and I Speak” program were held at Hrazdan Stadium and attracted an enormous audience—about 200,000 spectators in total.

In 1989, a year after the 1988 Armenian earthquake that killed 25,000 people and left more than 500,000 homeless, along with the break out of the First Nagorno-Karabakh War and the rise of the Karabakh movement and nationalism, hundreds of thousands of Armenians were looking for some kind of temporary diversion from the devastation and feeling the importance of national activities. More than 110,000 fans packed the Hrazdan stadium to hear revolutionary and patriotic songs performed by the Armenian famous singer Harout Pamboukjian. Then-Minister of Culture Yuri Melik-Ohanjanian remarked this was the highest-attended performance in the history of Armenia.

=== FC Ararat Yerevan ===
Top 10 matches for Ararat Yerevan with the highest attendance during the Soviet era:

- 19 May 1971, Soviet Top League: Ararat Yerevan 3-0 Kairat Almaty, att. 78,000.
- 19 March 1975, 1974–75 European Cup quarter finals, 2nd leg: Ararat Yerevan 1-0 Bayern Munich, att. 70,000.
- 28 October 1973, Soviet Top League: Ararat Yerevan 3-2 Zenit Leningrad, att. 70,000.
- 13 October 1974, Soviet Top League: Ararat Yerevan 2-2 Dinamo Tbilisi, att. 70,000.
- 22 July 1973, Soviet Top League: Ararat Yerevan 3-0 Dinamo Minsk, att. 70,000.
- 14 April 1973, Soviet Top League: Ararat Yerevan 1-1 [pen. 4-3] Zarya Voroshilovgrad, att. 70,000.
- 14 September 1971, Soviet Top League: Ararat Yerevan 0-1 Dinamo Tbilisi, att. 70,000.
- 20 June 1971, Soviet Top League: Ararat Yerevan 1-0 Shakhtyor Donetsk, att. 70,000.
- 16 July 1975, Soviet Cup semifinal: Ararat Yerevan 3-1 Dinamo Tbilisi, att. 68,600.
- 8 July 1973, Soviet Top League: Ararat Yerevan 1-0 CSKA Moscow, att. 66,000.

=== National teams ===
- 9 October 1996, 1998 World Cup qualifying, group 9: Armenia 1–5 Germany, att. 42,000.
- 20 September 1978, Euro 1980 qualifying, group 6: Soviet Union 2-0 Greece, att. 40,000.
- 26 April 1995, Euro 1996 qualifying, group 2: Armenia 0–2 Spain, att. 35,000.
- 12 October 2012, 2014 World Cup qualifying, Group B: Armenia 1-3 Italy, att. 32,000.
- 6 September 2008, 2010 World Cup qualifying, group 5: Armenia 0–2 Turkey, att. 30,000.
