= FC Urartu in European football =

Overview of FC Urartu's role in European football

Urartu in European football
- Club: Urartu
- Most appearances: Ararat Arakelyan (13)
- Top scorer: Aram Hakobyan (4)
- First entry: 1996–97 UEFA Cup
- Latest entry: 2025–26 UEFA Europa Conference League

Urartu is an Armenian football club based in Yerevan, Armenia and until 1 August 2019 was known as FC Banants. The club plays in the Armenian Premier League.

== History ==
=== 2000's ===
Banants made their European debut on 14 August 2003, in a UEFA Cup Qualifying round match against Hapoel Tel Aviv from Israel, drawing the match 1–1 at the Sparta Stadion Het Kasteel in Rotterdam, Netherlands. The second leg was played at the Republican Stadium in Yerevan, Armenia, on 28 August 2003 with Hapoel Tel Aviv winning 2-1 and 3–2 on aggregate.

=== Matches ===
As of match played 17 July 2025

| Season | Competition | Round | Opponent | Home | Away | Aggregate |
|---|---|---|---|---|---|---|
| 2003–04 | UEFA Cup | QR | (Israel) Hapoel Tel Aviv | 1–2 | 1–1 | 2–3 |
| 2004–05 | UEFA Cup | 1Q | (Ukraine) Illichivets Mariupol | 0–2 | 0–2 | 0–4 |
| 2005–06 | UEFA Cup | 1Q | (Georgia (country)) Locomotive Tbilisi | 2–3 | 2–0 | 4–3 |
| 2005–06 | UEFA Cup | 2Q | (Ukraine) Dnipro Dnipropetrovsk | 2–4 | 0–4 | 2–8 |
| 2006–07 | UEFA Cup | 1Q | (Georgia (country)) Ameri Tbilisi | 1–2 | 1–0 | 2–2 (a) |
| 2007–08 | UEFA Cup | 1Q | (Switzerland) Young Boys | 1–1 | 0–4 | 1–5 |
| 2008–09 | UEFA Cup | 1Q | (Austria) Red Bull Salzburg | 0–3 | 0–7 | 0–10 |
| 2009–10 | UEFA Europa League | 1Q | (Bosnia and Herzegovina) Široki Brijeg | 0–2 | 1–0 | 1–2 |
| 2010–11 | UEFA Europa League | 1Q | (Cyprus) Anorthosis Famagusta | 0–1 | 0–3 | 0–4 |
| 2011–12 | UEFA Europa League | 1Q | (Georgia (country)) Rustavi Metalurgist | 0–1 | 1–1 | 1–2 |
| 2014–15 | UEFA Champions League | 1Q | (Andorra) Santa Coloma | 3–2 | 0–1 | 3–3 (a) |
| 2016–17 | UEFA Europa League | 1Q | (Cyprus) Omonia | 0–1 | 1–4 | 1–5 |
| 2018–19 | UEFA Europa League | 1Q | (Bosnia and Herzegovina) Sarajevo | 1–2 | 0–3 | 1–5 |
| 2019–20 | UEFA Europa League | 1Q | (Serbia) Čukarički | 0–5 | 0–3 | 0–8 |
| 2021–22 | UEFA Europa Conference League | 1Q | (Slovenia) Maribor | 0–1 | 0–1 | 0–2 |
| 2023–24 | UEFA Champions League | 1Q | (Bosnia and Herzegovina) Zrinjski Mostar | 0–1 | 3–2 | 3–3 (4–3 p) |
| 2023–24 | UEFA Europa Conference League | 2Q | (Romania) Farul Constanța | 2–3 | 2–3 | 4–6 |
| 2024–25 | UEFA Conference League | 1Q | (Estonia) Tallinna Kalev | 2–0 | 2–1 | 4–1 |
| 2024–25 | UEFA Conference League | 2Q | (Czech Republic) Baník Ostrava | 0–2 | 1–5 | 1–7 |
| 2025–26 | UEFA Conference League | 1Q | (Belarus) Neman Grodno | 1–2 | 0–4 | 1–6 |

== Player statistics ==
=== Appearances ===
As of match played 17 July 2025

| | Name | Years | UEFA Cup | UEFA Champions League | UEFA Europa League | UEFA Conference League | Total | Ratio |
|---|---|---|---|---|---|---|---|---|
| 1 | (Armenia) Ararat Arakelyan | 2002-2011, 2012-2013 | 10 (0) | (-) | 3 (0) | (-) | 13 (0) | 0 |
| 2 | (Armenia) Samvel Melkonyan | 2002-2008, 2009-2010 | 8 (0) | (-) | 4 (0) | (-) | 12 (0) | 0 |
| 3 | (Armenia) Karen Simonyan | 2003-2007 | 11 (0) | (-) | (-) | (-) | 11 (0) | 0 |
| 3 | (Armenia) Romeo Jenebyan | 2000-2008 | 11 (0) | (-) | (-) | (-) | 11 (0) | 0 |
| 5 | (Armenia) Karen Melkonyan | 2017- | (-) | 1 (0) | 4 (0) | 5 (0) | 10 (0) | 0 |
| 6 | (Armenia) Hovhannes Grigoryan | 2005-2009 | 8 (0) | (-) | 1 (0) | (-) | 9 (0) | 0 |
| 6 | (Armenia) Arsen Balabekyan | 2006-2012 | 4 (0) | (-) | 5 (0) | (-) | 9 (0) | 0 |
| 6 | (Armenia) Zhirayr Margaryan | 2022-2023, 2023- | (-) | 2 (0) | (-) | 7 (0) | 9 (0) | 0 |
| 9 | (Armenia) Ashot Grigoryan | 2003-2005, 2006-2007 | 8 (0) | (-) | (-) | (-) | 8 (0) | 0 |
| 9 | (Armenia) Aghvan Hayrapetyan | 2005-2009 | 8 (0) | (-) | (-) | (-) | 8 (0) | 0 |
| 9 | (Armenia) Aram Bareghamyan | 2005-2010, 2016-2020 | 4 (0) | (-) | 4 (0) | (-) | 8 (0) | 0 |
| 9 | (Armenia) Gagik Daghbashyan | 2007-2015 | 2 (0) | 2 (0) | 4 (0) | (-) | 8 (0) | 0 |
| 9 | (Armenia) Vahagn Ayvazyan | 2013-2020 | (-) | 2 (0) | 6 (1) | (-) | 8 (1) | 0.13 |
| 9 | (Armenia) Narek Agasaryan | 2021- | (-) | 0 (0) | (-) | 8 (0) | 8 (0) | 0 |
| 9 | (Armenia) Erik Piloyan | 2020- | (-) | 2 (0) | (-) | 6 (0) | 8 (0) | 0 |
| 16 | (Armenia) Simyon Muradyan | 2006-2009, 2014 | 5 (0) | 2 (0) | (-) | (-) | 7 (0) | 0 |
| 16 | (Armenia) Mikayel Mirzoyan | 2023- | (-) | (-) | (-) | 7 (2) | 7 (2) | 0.29 |
| 18 | (Armenia) Aram Hakobyan | 2003, 2005–2006, 2007, 2008 | 6 (4) | (-) | (-) | (-) | 6 (4) | 0.67 |
| 18 | (Armenia) Ara Khachatryan | 2005, 2007 | 6 (1) | (-) | (-) | (-) | 6 (1) | 0.17 |
| 18 | (Armenia) Stepan Ghazaryan | 2007-2013, 2015-2019 | (-) | (-) | 6 (0) | (-) | 6 (0) | 0 |
| 18 | (Armenia) Artur Voskanyan | 2002, 2009-2011 | (-) | (-) | 6 (0) | (-) | 6 (0) | 0 |
| 18 | (Armenia) Artak Dashyan | 2007-2009, 2011–2013, 2019–2020 | (-) | (-) | 6 (0) | (-) | 6 (0) | 0 |
| 18 | (Armenia) Walter Poghosyan | 2009-2017 | (-) | 2 (0) | 4 (0) | (-) | 6 (0) | 0 |
| 18 | (Armenia) Hakob Hakobyan (Note: Hakob Hakobyan was born in Georgia, and went on to represent Armenia at international level in 2020.) | 2014-2022 | (-) | (-) | 4 (0) | 2 (0) | 6 (0) | 0 |
| 18 | (Ghana) Nana Antwi | 2021-2024 | (-) | 2 (0) | (-) | 4 (1) | 6 (1) | 0.17 |
| 18 | (Armenia) Narek Grigoryan | 2018-2023 | (-) | 2 (2) | (0) | 4 (0) | 6 (1) | 0.33 |
| 18 | (Armenia) Yevhen Tsymbalyuk | 2022-2024, 2025- | (-) | 2 (0) | (-) | 4 (0) | 6 (0) | 0 |
| 28 | (Uzbekistan) Temur Ganiev | 2004-2005 | 5 (0) | (-) | (-) | (-) | 5 (0) | 0 |
| 28 | (Armenia) Artak Oseyan | 2004-2007, 2009 | 4 (0) | (-) | 1 (0) | (-) | 5 (0) | 0 |
| 28 | (Ukraine) Andrey Cherevko | 2006-2009 | 4 (0) | (-) | 1 (0) | (-) | 5 (0) | 0 |
| 28 | (Armenia) Eduard Kakosyan | 2004-2010 | 4 (1) | (-) | 1 (0) | (-) | 5 (1) | 0.2 |
| 28 | (Armenia) Sargis Karapetyan | 2006-2011 | 3 (0) | (-) | 2 (0) | (-) | 5 (0) | 0 |
| 28 | (Armenia) Arman Ghazaryan | 2022- | (-) | 1 (0) | (-) | 4 (0) | 5 (0) | 0 |
| 28 | (Armenia) Edgar Movsesyan | 2016-2017, 2024-2025 | (-) | (-) | 2 (0) | 3 (2) | 5 (2) | 0.4 |
| 28 | (Russia) Oleg Polyakov | 2020-2026 | (-) | 1 (0) | 2 (0) | 2 (0) | 5 (0) | 0 |
| 28 | (Ukraine) Artem Polyarus | 2024- | (-) | (-) | (-) | 5 (0) | 5 (0) | 0 |
| 28 | (Armenia) Davit Harutyunyan | 2024- | (-) | (-) | (-) | 5 (0) | 5 (0) | 0 |
| 38 | (Armenia) Hovhannes Demirchyan | 2003-2004 | 4 (0) | (-) | (-) | (-) | 4 (0) | 0 |
| 38 | (Ukraine) Dmytro Kondrashenko | 2003-2004 | 4 (0) | (-) | (-) | (-) | 4 (0) | 0 |
| 38 | (Armenia) Ara Hakobyan | 2003, 2007 | 4 (0) | (-) | (-) | (-) | 4 (0) | 0 |
| 38 | (Armenia) Yuriy Dudnyk | 2005 | 4 (0) | (-) | (-) | (-) | 4 (0) | 0 |
| 38 | (Moldova) Dumitru Gusila | 2005 | 4 (0) | (-) | (-) | (-) | 4 (0) | 0 |
| 38 | (Armenia) Tigran Gharabaghtsyan | 2002-2006 | 4 (1) | (-) | (-) | (-) | 4 (1) | 0.25 |
| 38 | (Armenia) Vahe Tadevosyan | 2005-2006, 2009-2010 | 4 (2) | (-) | (-) | (-) | 4 (2) | 0.5 |
| 38 | (Serbia) Nenad Radaca | 2006-2008 | 4 (0) | (-) | (-) | (-) | 4 (0) | 0 |
| 38 | (Armenia) Norayr Gyozalyan | 2007-2011, 2017-2018 | 1 (0) | (-) | 3 (0) | (-) | 4 (0) | 0 |
| 38 | (Uganda) Noah Kasule | 2007-2010 | (-) | (-) | 4 (0) | (-) | 4 (0) | 0 |
| 38 | (Armenia) Hovhannes Hambardzumyan | 2008-2014 | (-) | (-) | 4 (0) | (-) | 4 (0) | 0 |
| 38 | (Ghana) Edward Kpodo | 2018-2020 | (-) | (-) | 4 (0) | (-) | 4 (0) | 0 |
| 38 | (Serbia) Igor Stanojević | 2018-2019 | (-) | (-) | 4 (0) | (-) | 4 (0) | 0 |
| 38 | (Armenia) Narek Petrosyan | 2015-2020 | (-) | (-) | 4 (0) | (-) | 4 (0) | 0 |
| 38 | (Burkina Faso) Dramane Salou | 2023-2024 | (-) | 2 (0) | (-) | 2 (0) | 4 (0) | 0 |
| 38 | (Armenia) Aras Özbiliz (Note: Aras Özbiliz was born in Turkey, and went on to represent Armenia at international level in 2012.) | 2023 | (-) | 2 (0) | (-) | 2 (0) | 4 (0) | 0 |
| 38 | (Brazil) Marcos Júnior | 2022-2023 | (-) | 2 (0) | (-) | 2 (0) | 4 (0) | 0 |
| 38 | (Russia) Aleksandr Melikhov | 2022-2025 | (-) | 2 (0) | (-) | 2 (0) | 4 (0) | 0 |
| 38 | (Russia) Artyom Maksimenko | 2023 | (-) | 2 (1) | (-) | 2 (1) | 4 (2) | 0.5 |
| 38 | (Armenia) Erik Simonyan | 2019-2026 | (-) | (-) | (-) | 3 (0) | 4 (0) | 0 |
| 38 | (Armenia) Hayk Ghazaryan | 2024- | (-) | (-) | (-) | 4 (0) | 4 (0) | 0 |
| 38 | (Armenia) Khariton Ayvazyan | 2020- | (-) | (-) | (-) | 4 (0) | 4 (0) | 0 |
| 60 | (Armenia) Arshak Amiryan | 2003-2005 | 3 (2) | (-) | (-) | (-) | 3 (2) | 0.67 |
| 60 | (Ukraine) Andrey Burdiyan | 2006-2008 | 3 (0) | (-) | (-) | (-) | 3 (0) | 0 |
| 60 | (Armenia) Suren Sargsyan | 2002-2007 | 3 (0) | (-) | (-) | (-) | 3 (0) | 0 |
| 60 | (Armenia) Grisha Khachatryan | 2009-2013 | (-) | (-) | 3 (0) | (-) | 3 (0) | 0 |
| 60 | (Armenia) Artashes Arakelyan | 2006-2008 | (-) | 2 (0) | 1 (0) | (-) | 3 (0) | 0 |
| 60 | (Armenia) Aram Loretsyan | 2013-2015, 2017-2019 | (-) | 2 (0) | 1 (0) | (-) | 3 (0) | 0 |
| 60 | (Armenia) Anatoliy Ayvazov | 2018-2022 | (-) | (-) | 1 (0) | 2 (0) | 3 (0) | 0 |
| 60 | (Armenia) Aram Ayrapetyan (Note: Aram Ayrapetyan was born in Russia, and went on to represent Armenia at international level in 2018.) | 2014, 2017-2020 | (-) | 0 (0) | 3 (0) | (-) | 3 (0) | 0 |
| 60 | (Armenia) Ugochukwu Iwu (Note: Ugochukwu Iwu was born in Nigeria, and went on to represent Armenia at international level in 2023.) | 2020-2023 | (-) | 1 (0) | (-) | 2 (0) | 3 (0) | 0 |
| 60 | (Ukraine) Ivan Zotko | 2023 | (-) | 1 (0) | (-) | 2 (1) | 3 (1) | 0.33 |
| 60 | (Russia) Leon Sabua (Note: Leon Sabua was born in Georgia.) | 2022-2025 | (-) | 2 (0) | (-) | 1 (1) | 3 (1) | 0.33 |
| 60 | (Russia) Pavel Mogilevets | 2023 | (-) | 2 (0) | (-) | 1 (0) | 3 (0) | 0 |
| 60 | (Russia) Temur Dzhikiya | 2023-2024 | (-) | 1 (0) | (-) | 2 (0) | 3 (0) | 0 |
| 60 | (Nigeria) Barry Isaac | 2022-2025 | (-) | (-) | (-) | 2 (0) | 3 (0) | 0 |
| 60 | (Morocco) Ayoub Abou | 2024-2025 | (-) | (-) | (-) | 3 (0) | 3 (0) | 0 |
| 60 | (Nigeria) Luqman Gilmore | 2024-2025 | (-) | (-) | (-) | 3 (0) | 3 (0) | 0 |
| 60 | (Armenia) Gevorg Tarakhchyan | 2019-2021, 2023-2025 | (-) | (-) | (-) | 3 (1) | 3 (1) | 0.33 |
| 77 | (Russia) Dmitriy Vorobiev | 2003 | 2 (0) | (-) | (-) | (-) | 2 (0) | 0 |
| 77 | (Armenia) Sergey Arakelyan | 2003 | 2 (0) | (-) | (-) | (-) | 2 (0) | 0 |
| 77 | (Ukraine) Oleksandr Kucher | 2003-2004 | 2 (0) | (-) | (-) | (-) | 2 (0) | 0 |
| 77 | (Ukraine) Mikola Hibalyuk | 2003 | 2 (0) | (-) | (-) | (-) | 2 (0) | 0 |
| 77 | (Armenia) Karen Barseghyan | 2003 | 2 (0) | (-) | (-) | (-) | 2 (0) | 0 |
| 77 | (Armenia) Aram Sargsyan | 2003-2004 | 2 (0) | (-) | (-) | (-) | 2 (0) | 0 |
| 77 | (Armenia) Artem Pidgayniy | 2004 | 2 (0) | (-) | (-) | (-) | 2 (0) | 0 |
| 77 | (Ukraine) Artem Yevlyanov | 2004-2005 | 2 (0) | (-) | (-) | (-) | 2 (0) | 0 |
| 77 | (Armenia) Sergey Erzrumyan | 2004 | 2 (0) | (-) | (-) | (-) | 2 (0) | 0 |
| 77 | (Armenia) Nshan Erzrumyan | 2003-2004 | 2 (0) | (-) | (-) | (-) | 2 (0) | 0 |
| 77 | (Armenia) Artur Minasyan | 2001, 2002, 2003-2004 | 2 (0) | (-) | (-) | (-) | 2 (0) | 0 |
| 77 | (Moldova) Serghei Secu | 2005 | 2 (0) | (-) | (-) | (-) | 2 (0) | 0 |
| 77 | (Ukraine) Sergey Sidikhin | 2006 | 2 (0) | (-) | (-) | (-) | 2 (0) | 0 |
| 77 | (Moldova) Eugen Matiughin | 2008-2009 | 2 (0) | (-) | (-) | (-) | 2 (0) | 0 |
| 77 | (Russia) Romik Khachatryan | 2008-2009 | 2 (0) | (-) | (-) | (-) | 2 (0) | 0 |
| 77 | (Bulgaria) Marko Markov | 2008 | 2 (0) | (-) | (-) | (-) | 2 (0) | 0 |
| 77 | (Bulgaria) Simeon Zlatev | 2008-2009 | 2 (0) | (-) | (-) | (-) | 2 (0) | 0 |
| 77 | (Ukraine) Dmytro Nazarenko | 2003 | (-) | (-) | 2 (0) | (-) | 2 (0) | 0 |
| 77 | (Armenia) Sargis Nasibyan | 2009 | (-) | (-) | 2 (0) | (-) | 2 (0) | 0 |
| 77 | (Armenia) Hamlet Mkhitaryan | 2009 | (-) | (-) | 2 (0) | (-) | 2 (0) | 0 |
| 77 | (Ukraine) Volodimir Romanenko | 2009 | (-) | (-) | 2 (0) | (-) | 2 (0) | 0 |
| 77 | (Bulgaria) Nikolay Nikolov | 2010 | (-) | (-) | 2 (0) | (-) | 2 (0) | 0 |
| 77 | (Brazil) Beto | 2010-2012 | (-) | (-) | 2 (0) | (-) | 2 (0) | 0 |
| 77 | (Nigeria) Ortega Deniran | 2010 | (-) | (-) | 2 (0) | (-) | 2 (0) | 0 |
| 77 | (Ukraine) Dmytro Nepohodov (Note: Dmytro Nepohodov was born in Ukraine, and went on to represent Kazakhstan at international level in 2018.) | 2011-2012 | (-) | (-) | 2 (0) | (-) | 2 (0) | 0 |
| 77 | (Armenia) Artur Yedigaryan | 2011 | (-) | (-) | 2 (0) | (-) | 2 (0) | 0 |
| 77 | (Brazil) Bruno Correa | 2011-2012 | (-) | (-) | 2 (0) | (-) | 2 (0) | 0 |
| 77 | (Armenia) Argishti Petrosyan | 2011-2014 | (-) | (-) | 2 (0) | (-) | 2 (0) | 0 |
| 77 | (Armenia) Davit Sujyan | 2010-2014 | (-) | (-) | 2 (0) | (-) | 2 (0) | 0 |
| 77 | (Armenia) Artur Toroyan | 2012-2015 | (-) | 2 (0) | (-) | (-) | 2 (0) | 0 |
| 77 | (Russia) Maxim Usanov | 2014-2015 | (-) | 2 (0) | (-) | (-) | 2 (0) | 0 |
| 77 | (Mali) Sékou Fofana | 2003 | (-) | 2 (0) | (-) | (-) | 2 (0) | 0 |
| 77 | (Armenia) Rumyan Hovsepyan | 2013-2014, 2017-2018 | (-) | 2 (2) | (-) | (-) | 2 (2) | 1 |
| 77 | (Armenia) Gevorg Karapetyan | 2012-2015 | (-) | 2 (0) | (-) | (-) | 2 (0) | 0 |
| 77 | (Armenia) Areg Azatyan | 2014 | (-) | 2 (0) | (-) | (-) | 2 (0) | 0 |
| 77 | (Armenia) Gevorg Nranyan | 2014-2015 | (-) | 2 (0) | (-) | (-) | 2 (0) | 0 |
| 77 | (North Macedonia) Vlatko Drobarov | 2015-2017 | (-) | (-) | 2 (0) | (-) | 2 (0) | 0 |
| 77 | (Russia) Layonel Adams | 2016-2017 | (-) | (-) | 2 (0) | (-) | 2 (0) | 0 |
| 77 | (Russia) Aslan Kalmanov | 2016-2017 | (-) | (-) | 2 (0) | (-) | 2 (0) | 0 |
| 77 | (Russia) Soslan Kachmazov | 2016-2017 | (-) | (-) | 2 (0) | (-) | 2 (0) | 0 |
| 77 | (Armenia) Petros Avetisyan | 2014-2016 | (-) | (-) | 2 (0) | (-) | 2 (0) | 0 |
| 77 | (United States) Claudio Torrejón | 2016 | (-) | (-) | 2 (0) | (-) | 2 (0) | 0 |
| 77 | (Armenia) Zaven Badoyan | 2015-2016 | (-) | (-) | 2 (0) | (-) | 2 (0) | 0 |
| 77 | (Russia) Atsamaz Burayev | 2015-2016 | (-) | (-) | 2 (0) | (-) | 2 (0) | 0 |
| 77 | (Serbia) Borislav Jovanović | 2017-2019 | (-) | (-) | 2 (0) | (-) | 2 (0) | 0 |
| 77 | (Nigeria) Solomon Udo (Note: Solomon Udo was born in Nigeria, and went on to represent Armenia at international level in 2020.) | 2018-2019 | (-) | (-) | 2 (0) | (-) | 2 (0) | 0 |
| 77 | (Serbia) Ognjen Krasić | 2017-2018 | (-) | (-) | 2 (0) | (-) | 2 (0) | 0 |
| 77 | (Trinidad and Tobago) Lester Peltier | 2018 | (-) | (-) | 2 (0) | (-) | 2 (0) | 0 |
| 77 | (Brazil) Wal | 2017-2019 | (-) | (-) | 2 (0) | (-) | 2 (0) | 0 |
| 77 | (Ghana) Kwasi Sibo | 2017-2018 | (-) | (-) | 2 (0) | (-) | 2 (0) | 0 |
| 77 | (Russia) Yevgeni Kobzar | 2019-2021 | 0 (0) | (-) | (-) | 2 (0) | 2 (0) | 0 |
| 77 | (Russia) Semyon Sinyavsky | 2019-2020 | 0 (0) | (-) | (-) | 2 (0) | 2 (0) | 0 |
| 77 | (Armenia) Andranik Voskanyan | 2019 | 0 (0) | (-) | (-) | 2 (0) | 2 (0) | 0 |
| 77 | (Senegal) Pape Camara | 2018-2019 | 0 (0) | (-) | (-) | 2 (0) | 2 (0) | 0 |
| 77 | (Bosnia and Herzegovina) Aleksandar Glišić | 2019 | 0 (0) | (-) | (-) | 2 (0) | 2 (0) | 0 |
| 77 | (Russia) Pyotr Ten | 2020-2021 | (-) | (-) | 2 (0) | (-) | 2 (0) | 0 |
| 77 | (Ghana) Annan Mensah | 2020-2022 | (-) | (-) | 2 (0) | (-) | 2 (0) | 0 |
| 77 | (Rwanda) Salomon Nirisarike | 2021-2022 | (-) | (-) | 2 (0) | (-) | 2 (0) | 0 |
| 77 | (Armenia) Artur Miranyan | 2021-2022 | (-) | (-) | 2 (0) | (-) | 2 (0) | 0 |
| 77 | (Armenia) Edgar Grigoryan | 2020-2022 | (-) | (-) | 2 (0) | (-) | 2 (0) | 0 |
| 77 | (Belgium) Livio Milts | 2021 | (-) | (-) | 2 (0) | (-) | 2 (0) | 0 |
| 77 | (Armenia) Sergey Mkrtchyan | 2021- | (-) | (-) | (-) | 2 (0) | 2 (0) | 0 |
| 77 | (Brazil) Bruno Michel | 2025- | (-) | (-) | (-) | 2 (0) | 2 (0) | 0 |
| 77 | (Russia) Maksim Paliyenko | 2025 | (-) | (-) | (-) | 2 (0) | 2 (0) | 0 |
| 77 | (Armenia) Nicholas Kaloukian'|2025-2026 | (-) | (-) | (-) | 2 (1) | 2 (1) | 0.5 | |
| 77 | (Russia) Artemi Gunko | 2025-2026 | (-) | (-) | (-) | 2 (0) | 2 (0) | 0 |
| 77 | (Russia) Vladislav Yakovlev | 2025 | (-) | (-) | (-) | 2 (0) | 2 (0) | 0 |
| 143 | (Armenia) Albert Iskoyants | 2004 | 1 (0) | (-) | (-) | (-) | 1 (0) | 0 |
| 143 | (Georgia (country)) Manuchari Ivardava | 2005 | 1 (0) | (-) | (-) | (-) | 1 (0) | 0 |
| 143 | (Armenia) Ara Karapetyan | 2005 | 1 (0) | (-) | (-) | (-) | 1 (0) | 0 |
| 143 | (Armenia) Eghishe Melikyan | 2007-2008 | 1 (0) | (-) | (-) | (-) | 1 (0) | 0 |
| 143 | (Bulgaria) Plamen Krumov | 2008 | 1 (0) | (-) | (-) | (-) | 1 (0) | 0 |
| 143 | (Belarus) Maksim Tsyhalka | 2008 | 1 (0) | (-) | (-) | (-) | 1 (0) | 0 |
| 143 | (Ukraine) Yarema Kavatsiv | 2009 | (-) | (-) | 1 (0) | (-) | 1 (0) | 0 |
| 143 | (Armenia) Zhora Stepanyan | 2008-2010 | (-) | (-) | 1 (0) | (-) | 1 (0) | 0 |
| 143 | (Armenia) Khachatur Avetisyan | 2010-2014 | (-) | (-) | 1 (0) | (-) | 1 (0) | 0 |
| 143 | (Brazil) Du Bala | 2010-2012 | (-) | (-) | 1 (0) | (-) | 1 (0) | 0 |
| 143 | (Armenia) Benik Hovhannisyan | 2010-2013 | (-) | (-) | 1 (0) | (-) | 1 (0) | 0 |
| 143 | (Armenia) Aram Shakhnazaryan | 2012-2016 | (-) | 1 (0) | (-) | (-) | 1 (0) | 0 |
| 143 | (Armenia) Garegin Mashumyan | 2014-2015 | (-) | 1 (1) | (-) | (-) | 1 (1) | 1 |
| 143 | (Armenia) Aleksandr Hovhannisyan | 2015-2018 | (-) | (-) | 1 (0) | (-) | 1 (0) | 0 |
| 143 | (North Macedonia) Jasmin Mecinovikj (Note: Jasmin Mecinovikj was born in Socialist Republic of Serbia, and went on to represent Macedonia at international level in 2012.) | 2016 | (-) | (-) | 1 (0) | (-) | 1 (0) | 0 |
| 143 | (Brazil) Fagner Santos | 2018 | (-) | (-) | 1 (0) | (-) | 1 (0) | 0 |
| 143 | (Brazil) Eduardo Teixeira | 2023 | (-) | (-) | 1 (0) | (-) | 1 (0) | 0 |
| 143 | (Montenegro) Periša Pešukić | 2023-2024 | (-) | (-) | 1 (0) | (-) | 1 (0) | 0 |
| 143 | (France) Yaya Sanogo | 2023-2024 | (-) | (-) | 1 (0) | (-) | 1 (0) | 0 |
| 143 | (Russia) Ivan Ignatyev | 2024-2025 | (-) | (-) | (-) | 1 (0) | 1 (0) | 0 |
| 143 | (Armenia) Gor Matinyan | 2024- | (-) | (-) | (-) | 1 (0) | 1 (0) | 0 |
| 143 | (Montenegro) Andrija Dragojević | 2025- | (-) | (-) | (-) | 1 (0) | 1 (0) | 0 |
| 143 | (Ukraine) Anton Bratkov | 2025- | (-) | (-) | (-) | 1 (0) | 1 (0) | 0 |

=== Goalscorers ===
As of match played 17 July 2025

| | Name | Years | UEFA Cup | UEFA Champions League | UEFA Europa League | UEFA Conference League | Total | Ratio |
|---|---|---|---|---|---|---|---|---|
| 1 | (Armenia) Aram Hakobyan | 2003, 2005–2006, 2007, 2008 | 4 (6) | (-) | (-) | (-) | 4 (6) | 0.67 |
| 2 | (Armenia) Arshak Amiryan | 2003-2005 | 2 (3) | (-) | (-) | (-) | 2 (3) | 0.67 |
| 2 | (Armenia) Vahe Tadevosyan | 2005-2006, 2009-2010 | 2 (4) | (-) | (-) | (-) | 2 (4) | 0.5 |
| 2 | (Armenia) Rumyan Hovsepyan | 2013-2014, 2017-2018 | (-) | 2 (2) | (-) | (-) | 2 (2) | 1 |
| 2 | (Armenia) Narek Grigoryan | 2018-2023 | (-) | 2 (2) | (-) | 0 (2) | 2 (4) | 0.5 |
| 2 | (Russia) Artyom Maksimenko | 2023 | (-) | 1 (2) | (-) | 1 (2) | 2 (4) | 0.5 |
| 2 | (Armenia) Edgar Movsesyan | 2016-2017, 2024-2025 | (-) | (-) | 0 (2) | 2 (2) | 2 (4) | 0.5 |
| 2 | (Armenia) Mikayel Mirzoyan | 2023-Present | (-) | 0 (0) | (-) | 2 (6) | 2 (6) | 0.33 |
| 9 | (Armenia) Tigran Gharabaghtsyan | 2002-2006 | 1 (4) | (-) | (-) | (-) | 1 (4) | 0.25 |
| 9 | (Armenia) Ara Khachatryan | 2005-2008 | 1 (8) | (-) | 0 (1) | (-) | 1 (9) | 0.11 |
| 9 | (Armenia) Eduard Kakosyan | 2004-2010 | 1 (4) | (-) | 0 (1) | (-) | 1 (5) | 0.2 |
| 9 | (Armenia) Artak Dashyan | 2007-2009, 2011–2013, 2019–2020 | 0 (0) | (-) | 1 (6) | (-) | 1 (6) | 0.17 |
| 9 | (Brazil) Du Bala | 2010-2012 | (-) | (-) | 1 (2) | (-) | 1 (2) | 0.5 |
| 9 | (Armenia) Garegin Mashumyan | 2014-2015 | (-) | 1 (1) | (-) | (-) | 1 (1) | 1 |
| 9 | (Russia) Atsamaz Burayev | 2015-2016 | (-) | (-) | 1 (2) | (-) | 1 (2) | 0.5 |
| 9 | (Armenia) Vahagn Ayvazyan | 2013-2020 | (-) | 0 (2) | 1 (6) | (-) | 1 (8) | 0.13 |
| 9 | (Ukraine) Ivan Zotko | 2023 | (-) | 0 (1) | (-) | 1 (2) | 1 (3) | 0.33 |
| 9 | (Russia) Leon Sabua | 2023-2025 | (-) | 0 (2) | (-) | 1 (1) | 1 (3) | 0.33 |
| 9 | (Ghana) Nana Antwi | 2021-2024 | (-) | 0 (2) | (-) | 1 (4) | 1 (6) | 0.17 |
| 9 | (Armenia) Gevorg Tarakhchyan | 2020-2021, 2023-2024 | (-) | (-) | (-) | 1 (3) | 1 (3) | 0.33 |
| 9 | (Armenia) Nicholas Kaloukian | 2025-2026 | (-) | (-) | (-) | 1 (2) | 1 (2) | 0.5 |

=== Clean sheets ===
As of match played 17 July 2025

| | Name | Years | UEFA Cup | UEFA Champions League | UEFA Europa League | UEFA Conference League | Total | Ratio |
|---|---|---|---|---|---|---|---|---|
| 1 | (Uzbekistan) Temur Ganiev | 2004-2005 | 1 (5) | (-) | (-) | (-) | 1 (5) | 0.2 |
| 1 | (Serbia) Nenad Radaca | 2006-2008 | 1 (4) | (-) | (-) | (-) | 1 (4) | 0.25 |
| 1 | (Armenia) Stepan Ghazaryan | 2007-2013, 2015-2019 | 0 (0) | (-) | 1 (6) | (-) | 1 (6) | 0.17 |
| 1 | (Armenia) Hayk Ghazaryan | 2024-Present | (-) | (-) | (-) | 1 (4) | 1 (4) | 0.25 |
| 5 | (Russia) Dmitriy Vorobyov | 2003 | 0 (2) | (-) | (-) | (-) | 0 (2) | 0 |
| 5 | (Georgia (country)) Manuchari Ivardava | 2005 | 0 (1) | (-) | (-) | (-) | 0 (1) | 0 |
| 5 | (Moldova) Eugen Matiughin | 2008-2009 | 0 (2) | (-) | (-) | (-) | 0 (2) | 0 |
| 5 | (Ukraine) Dmytro Nepohodov | 2011-2012 | (-) | (-) | 0 (2) | (-) | 0 (2) | 0 |
| 5 | (Armenia) Artur Toroyan | 2012-2015 | (-) | 0 (2) | (-) | (-) | 0 (2) | 0 |
| 5 | (Armenia) Aram Ayrapetyan | 2014, 2017-2020 | (-) | 0 (0) | 0 (3) | (-) | 0 (3) | 0 |
| 5 | (Armenia) Anatoly Ayvazov | 2018-2022 | (-) | (-) | 0 (1) | 0 (2) | 0 (3) | 0 |
| 5 | (Russia) Aleksandr Melikhov | 2022-2025 | (-) | 0 (2) | (-) | 0 (2) | 0 (4) | 0 |
| 5 | (Armenia) Gor Matinyan | 2024-2026 | (-) | (-) | (-) | 0 (1) | 0 (1) | 0 |
| 5 | (Montenegro) Andrija Dragojević | 2025-Present | (-) | (-) | (-) | 0 (1) | 0 (1) | 0 |

== Overall record ==
=== By competition ===
As of match played 17 July 2025

| Competition | GP | W | D | L | GF | GA | +/- |
|---|---|---|---|---|---|---|---|
| UEFA Champions League | 4 | 2 | 0 | 2 | 6 | 6 | 0 |
| UEFA Europa League / UEFA Cup | 26 | 3 | 3 | 20 | 15 | 61 | –46 |
| UEFA Conference League | 10 | 2 | 0 | 8 | 10 | 22 | -12 |
| Total | 40 | 7 | 3 | 30 | 31 | 89 | −58 |

=== By country ===
As of match played 17 July 2025

| Country | Pld | W | D | L | GF | GA | GD | Win% |
|---|---|---|---|---|---|---|---|---|
| Andorra | 2 | 1 | 0 | 1 | 3 | 3 | +0 | 50.00 |
| Austria | 2 | 0 | 0 | 2 | 0 | 10 | −10 | 0.00 |
| Belarus | 2 | 0 | 0 | 2 | 1 | 6 | −5 | 0.00 |
| Bosnia and Herzegovina | 6 | 2 | 0 | 4 | 5 | 10 | −5 | 33.33 |
| Cyprus | 4 | 0 | 0 | 4 | 1 | 9 | −8 | 0.00 |
| Czech Republic | 2 | 0 | 0 | 2 | 1 | 7 | −6 | 0.00 |
| Estonia | 2 | 2 | 0 | 0 | 4 | 1 | +3 | 100.00 |
| Georgia | 6 | 2 | 1 | 3 | 7 | 7 | +0 | 33.33 |
| Israel | 2 | 0 | 1 | 1 | 2 | 3 | −1 | 0.00 |
| Romania | 2 | 0 | 0 | 2 | 4 | 6 | −2 | 0.00 |
| Serbia | 2 | 0 | 0 | 2 | 0 | 8 | −8 | 0.00 |
| Slovenia | 2 | 0 | 0 | 2 | 0 | 2 | −2 | 0.00 |
| Switzerland | 2 | 0 | 1 | 1 | 1 | 5 | −4 | 0.00 |
| Ukraine | 4 | 0 | 0 | 4 | 2 | 12 | −10 | 0.00 |

=== By club ===
As of match played 17 July 2025

| Opponent | Played | Won | Drawn | Lost | For | Against | Difference | Ratio |
|---|---|---|---|---|---|---|---|---|
| (Georgia (country)) Ameri Tbilisi | 2 | 1 | 0 | 1 | 2 | 2 | +0 | 50.00 |
| (Cyprus) Anorthosis Famagusta | 2 | 0 | 0 | 2 | 0 | 4 | −4 | 0.00 |
| (Czech Republic) Baník Ostrava | 2 | 0 | 0 | 2 | 1 | 7 | −6 | 0.00 |
| (Serbia) Čukarički | 2 | 0 | 0 | 2 | 0 | 8 | −8 | 0.00 |
| (Ukraine) Dnipro Dnipropetrovsk | 2 | 0 | 0 | 2 | 2 | 8 | −6 | 0.00 |
| (Romania) Farul Constanța | 2 | 0 | 0 | 2 | 4 | 6 | −2 | 0.00 |
| (Israel) Hapoel Tel Aviv | 2 | 0 | 1 | 1 | 2 | 3 | −1 | 0.00 |
| (Ukraine) Illichivets Mariupol | 2 | 0 | 0 | 2 | 0 | 4 | −4 | 0.00 |
| (Georgia (country)) Locomotive Tbilisi | 2 | 1 | 0 | 1 | 4 | 3 | +1 | 50.00 |
| (Slovenia) Maribor | 2 | 0 | 0 | 2 | 0 | 2 | −2 | 0.00 |
| (Georgia (country)) Metalurgi Rustavi | 2 | 0 | 1 | 1 | 1 | 2 | −1 | 0.00 |
| (Belarus) Neman Grodno | 2 | 0 | 0 | 2 | 1 | 6 | −5 | 0.00 |
| (Cyprus) Omonia | 2 | 0 | 0 | 2 | 1 | 5 | −4 | 0.00 |
| (Austria) Red Bull Salzburg | 2 | 0 | 0 | 2 | 0 | 10 | −10 | 0.00 |
| (Andorra) Santa Coloma | 2 | 1 | 0 | 1 | 3 | 3 | +0 | 50.00 |
| (Bosnia and Herzegovina) Sarajevo | 2 | 0 | 0 | 2 | 1 | 5 | −4 | 0.00 |
| (Bosnia and Herzegovina) Široki Brijeg | 2 | 1 | 0 | 1 | 1 | 2 | −1 | 50.00 |
| (Estonia) Tallinna Kalev | 2 | 2 | 0 | 0 | 4 | 1 | +3 | 100.00 |
| (Switzerland) Young Boys | 2 | 0 | 1 | 1 | 1 | 5 | −4 | 0.00 |
| (Bosnia and Herzegovina) Zrinjski Mostar | 2 | 1 | 0 | 1 | 3 | 3 | +0 | 50.00 |
