= 2003–04 UEFA Cup qualifying round =

The 2003–04 UEFA Cup qualifying round was played from 12 to 28 August 2003. The round consisted of 41 ties, with the winners advancing to the first round of the 2003–04 UEFA Cup.

== Draw ==
The draw was held on 20 June 2003, 14:00 CEST, at the UEFA headquarters in Nyon, Switzerland. Teams were divided into geographical groups, each with seeded and unseeded pots.

== Summary ==
The first legs were played on 12, 13 and 14 August, and the second legs were played on 27 and 28 August 2003.

Team 1	Agg.	Team 2	1st leg	2nd leg
AIK (Sweden)	1–0	(Iceland) Fylkir	1–0	0–0
Vllaznia (Albania)	0–6	(Scotland) Dundee	0–2	0–4
Levadia Maardu (Estonia)	3–6	(Croatia) Varteks	1–3	2–3
Esbjerg (Denmark)	9–1	(Andorra) FC Santa Coloma	5–0	4–1
Željezničar (Bosnia and Herzegovina)	4–1	(Cyprus) Anorthosis Famagusta	1–0	3–1
Hapoel Tel Aviv (Israel)	3–2	(Armenia) Banants	1–1	2–1
Brøndby (Denmark)	5–0	(Belarus) Dinamo Minsk	3–0	2–0
Malmö FF (Sweden)	6–0	(Northern Ireland) Portadown	4–0	2–0
Dinamo București (Romania)	6–3	(Latvia) Liepājas Metalurgs	5–2	1–1
Valletta (Malta)	0–4	(Switzerland) Neuchâtel Xamax	0–2	0–2
Kärnten (Austria)	3–2	(Iceland) Grindavík	2–1	1–1
Viktoria Žižkov (Czech Republic)	6–1	(Kazakhstan) Zhenis	3–0	3–1
Sarajevo (Bosnia and Herzegovina)	1–4	(Serbia and Montenegro) Sartid	1–1	0–3
APOEL (Cyprus)	5–1	(Republic of Ireland) Derry City	2–1	3–0
Litex Lovech (Bulgaria)	0–2	(Moldova) Zimbru Chișinău	0–0	0–2
Neman Grodno (Belarus)	1–1 (a)	(Romania) Steaua București	1–1	0–0
Etzella Ettelbruck (Luxembourg)	1–9	(Croatia) Kamen Ingrad	1–2	0–7
Manchester City (England)	7–0	(Wales) Total Network Solutions	5–0	2–0
Molde (Norway)	6–0	(Faroe Islands) KÍ	2–0	4–0
Odense (Denmark)	4–1	(Estonia) TVMK	1–1	3–0
Ventspils (Latvia)	3–3 (a)	(Poland) Wisła Płock	1–1	2–2
MYPA (Finland)	5–4	(Switzerland) Young Boys	3–2	2–2
Vaduz (Liechtenstein)	0–2	(Ukraine) Dnipro Dnipropetrovsk	0–1	0–1
Coleraine (Northern Ireland)	2–6	(Portugal) União de Leiria	2–1	0–5
Groclin Grodzisk Wielkopolski (Poland)	6–1	(Lithuania) Atlantas	2–0	4–1
Dinamo Tirana (Albania)	1–7	(Belgium) Lokeren	0–4	1–3
Cwmbrân Town (Wales)	0–6	(Israel) Maccabi Haifa	0–3	0–3
Publikum (Slovenia)	12–2	(North Macedonia) Belasica	7–2	5–0
Cementarnica 55 (North Macedonia)	1–1 (a)	(Poland) GKS Katowice	0–0	1–1
Matador Púchov (Slovakia)	6–0	(Georgia (country)) Sioni Bolnisi	3–0	3–0
Red Star Belgrade (Serbia and Montenegro)	8–2	(Moldova) Nistru Otaci	5–0	3–2
Ekranas (Lithuania)	2–3	(Hungary) Debrecen	1–1	1–2 (a.e.t.)
Birkirkara (Malta)	0–6	(Hungary) Ferencváros	0–5	0–1
Haka (Finland)	2–2 (a)	(Croatia) Hajduk Split	2–1	0–1
Torpedo Moscow (Russia)	9–0	(San Marino) Domagnano	5–0	4–0
Atyrau (Kazakhstan)	1–6	(Bulgaria) Levski Sofia	1–4	0–2
Olimpija Ljubljana (Slovenia)	4–2	(Republic of Ireland) Shelbourne	1–0	3–2
Lens (France)	5–0	(Georgia (country)) Torpedo Kutaisi	3–0	2–0
Nordsjælland (Denmark)	6–0	(Armenia) Shirak	4–0	2–0
Artmedia Petržalka (Slovakia)	2–0	(Luxembourg) F91 Dudelange	1–0	1–0
NSÍ (Faroe Islands)	1–9	(Norway) Lyn	1–3	0–6

== Matches ==
14 August 2003
20:30

AIK (Sweden)	1–0	(Iceland) Fylkir
Quansah 89'	Report

Råsunda Stadium, Solna
Attendance: 7,556
Referee: Nicole Petignat (Switzerland)
28 August 2003
20:00

Fylkir (Iceland)	0–0	(Sweden) AIK
	Report

Laugardalsvöllur, Reykjavík
Attendance: 1,193
Referee: Mark Whitby (Wales)

AIK won 1–0 on aggregate.

14 August 2003
19:00

Vllaznia (Albania)	0–2	(Scotland) Dundee
	Report	Lovell 42'; Novo 49'

Loro Boriçi Stadium, Shkodër
Attendance: 10,000
Referee: Jaroslav Jára (Czech Republic)
28 August 2003
20:30

Dundee (Scotland)	4–0	(Albania) Vllaznia
Novo 2', 89'; Sara 41'; Rae 49'	Report

Dens Park, Dundee
Attendance: 8,200
Referee: Carlo Bertolini (Switzerland)

Dundee won 6–0 on aggregate.

14 August 2003
17:00

Levadia Maardu (Estonia)	1–3	(Croatia) Varteks
Rõtškov 55'	Report	Mumlek 33', 65'; Režić 71'

Kadrioru Stadium, Tallinn
Attendance: 1,700
Referee: Marian Mircea Salomir (Romania)
28 August 2003
18:00

Varteks (Croatia)	3–2	(Estonia) Levadia Maardu
Karić 34'; Kristić 58'; Šafarić 71'	Report	Leitan 72', 87'

Stadion Varteks, Varaždin
Attendance: 1,500
Referee: Eduard Cichý (Slovakia)

Varteks won 6–3 on aggregate.

14 August 2003
19:00

Esbjerg (Denmark)	5–0	(Andorra) FC Santa Coloma
Løvenkrands 14', 23'; Thorup 41', 76'; Hansen 83'	Report

Esbjerg Stadium, Esbjerg
Attendance: 1,605
Referee: Valery Vyalichka (Belarus)
28 August 2003
19:15

FC Santa Coloma (Andorra)	1–4	(Denmark) Esbjerg
Walker 38'	Report	Løvenkrands 9'; Thorup 10'; Hansen 31'; Høgh 62'

Estadi Comunal, Andorra la Vella
Attendance: 400
Referee: Robert Kranjc (Slovenia)

Esbjerg won 9–1 on aggregate.

14 August 2003
20:15

Željezničar (Bosnia and Herzegovina)	1–0	(Cyprus) Anorthosis Famagusta
Gredić 71'	Report

Asim Ferhatović Hase Stadium, Sarajevo
Attendance: 10,000
Referee: Kenny Clark (Scotland)
28 August 2003
19:00

Anorthosis Famagusta (Cyprus)	1–3	(Bosnia and Herzegovina) Željezničar
Velis 20'	Report	Gredić 8'; Jahić 25', 72'

Antonis Papadopoulos Stadium, Larnaca
Attendance: 7,100
Referee: Paolo Bertini (Italy)

Željezničar won 4–1 on aggregate.

14 August 2003
20:00

Hapoel Tel Aviv (Israel)	1–1	(Armenia) Banants
Rozen 45'	Report	Amiryan 73'

Het Kasteel, Rotterdam, Netherlands (Note: Due to security issues caused by the Second Intifada, Israeli teams were required to play their home matches at neutral venues until further notice.)
Attendance: 525
Referee: Jörg Keßler (Germany)
28 August 2003
16:00

Banants (Armenia)	1–2	(Israel) Hapoel Tel Aviv
Amiryan 67'	Report	Solchaga 13'; Edri 53'

Vazgen Sargsyan Republican Stadium, Yerevan
Attendance: 12,500
Referee: Ben Haverkort (Netherlands)

Hapoel Tel Aviv won 3–2 on aggregate.

14 August 2003
20:00

Brøndby (Denmark)	3–0	(Belarus) Dinamo Minsk
Jakobsson 3'; Wieghorst 19'; Bagger 89'	Report

Brøndby Stadium, Brøndbyvester
Attendance: 9,376
Referee: Athanassios Briakos (Greece)
28 August 2003
20:00

Dinamo Minsk (Belarus)	0–2	(Denmark) Brøndby
	Report	Retov 25'; Jonson 81'

Dinamo Stadium, Minsk
Attendance: 2,697
Referee: Rob Styles (England)

Brøndby won 5–0 on aggregate.

14 August 2003
20:00

Malmö FF (Sweden)	4–0	(Northern Ireland) Portadown
Mattisson 23'; Yngvesson 29', 57'; Skoog 77'	Report

Malmö Stadion, Malmö
Attendance: 5,941
Referee: Andrejs Sipailo (Latvia)
28 August 2003
19:30

Portadown (Northern Ireland)	0–2	(Sweden) Malmö FF
	Report	Ijeh 61', 64'

Shamrock Park, Portadown
Attendance: 650
Referee: Gevorg Hovhannisyan (Armenia)

Malmö FF won 6–0 on aggregate.

14 August 2003
19:00

Dinamo București (Romania)	5–2	(Latvia) Liepājas Metalurgs
Dănciulescu 17', 88'; Fl. Petre 30', 73'; Bărcăuan 78'	Report	Dobrecovs 42' (pen.); Šafranko 58'

Stadionul Național, București
Attendance: 8,530
Referee: Oleg Chykun (Belarus)
28 August 2003
17:00

Liepājas Metalurgs (Latvia)	1–1	(Romania) Dinamo București
Grebis 45'	Report	Zicu 25'

Daugava Stadium, Liepāja
Attendance: 2,400
Referee: Emil Laursen (Denmark)

Dinamo București won 6–3 on aggregate.

12 August 2003
19:30

Valletta (Malta)	0–2	(Switzerland) Neuchâtel Xamax
	Report	Griffiths 18'; Mangane 35'

Ta' Qali National Stadium, Valletta
Attendance: 815
Referee: Kuddusi Müftüoğlu (Turkey)
28 August 2003
20:15

Neuchâtel Xamax (Switzerland)	2–0	(Malta) Valletta
Griffiths 45'; Portillo 90'	Report

La Maladière, Neuchâtel
Attendance: 2,300
Referee: Paulius Malžinskas (Lithuania)

Neuchâtel Xamax won 4–0 on aggregate.

14 August 2003
18:00

Kärnten (Austria)	2–1	(Iceland) Grindavík
Schellander 28'; Kabát 77' (pen.)	Report	Flóventsson 84'

Wortherseestadion, Klagenfurt
Attendance: 2,584
Referee: Mike Dean (England)
28 August 2003
19:30

Grindavík (Iceland)	1–1	(Austria) Kärnten
Jónsson 9'	Report	Hota 90'

Grindavíkurvöllur, Grindavík
Attendance: 957
Referee: Jonas Eriksson (Sweden)

Kärnten won 3–2 on aggregate.

14 August 2003
17:00

Viktoria Žižkov (Czech Republic)	3–0	(Kazakhstan) Zhenis
Dirnbach 54'; Chihuri 60'; Mikolanda 90'	Report

FK Viktoria Stadion, Prague
Attendance: 1,216
Referee: Alan Kelly (Republic of Ireland)
27 August 2003
13:00

Zhenis (Kazakhstan)	1–3	(Czech Republic) Viktoria Žižkov
Kozyulin 89'	Report	Oravec 14'; Pikl 27'; Chihuri 79'

Kazhymukan Munaitpasov Stadium, Astana
Attendance: 7,800
Referee: Knud Stadsgaard (Denmark)

Viktoria Žižkov won 6–1 on aggregate.

12 August 2003
21:00

Sarajevo (Bosnia and Herzegovina)	1–1	(Serbia and Montenegro) Sartid
Kovačević 83' (o.g.)	Report	Mirosavljević 5'

Asim Ferhatović Hase Stadium, Sarajevo
Attendance: 18,100
Referee: Damien Ledentu (France)
28 August 2003
16:00

Sartid (Serbia and Montenegro)	3–0	(Bosnia and Herzegovina) Sarajevo
Pantelić 30' (pen.); Zečević 65'; Mudrinić 89'	Report

Smederevo City Stadium, Smederevo
Attendance: 8,046
Referee: Vitaliy Hodulian (Ukraine)

Sartid won 4–1 on aggregate.

14 August 2003
18:30

APOEL (Cyprus)	2–1	(Republic of Ireland) Derry City
Kowalczyk 22'; Okkarides 55'	Report	Beckett 44'

GSP Stadium, Nicosia
Attendance: 8,824
Referee: Oleh Oriekhov (Ukraine)
28 August 2003
20:30

Derry City (Republic of Ireland)	0–3	(Cyprus) APOEL
	Report	Malekkos 37'; Charalambidis 81'; Papandreou 90'

Brandywell Stadium, Derry
Attendance: 2,000
Referee: Ivan Bebek (Croatia)

APOEL won 5–1 on aggregate.

14 August 2003
19:30

Litex Lovech (Bulgaria)	0–0	(Moldova) Zimbru Chișinău
	Report

Lovech Stadium, Lovech
Attendance: 2,000
Referee: Gianluca Paparesta (Italy)
28 August 2003
19:00

Zimbru Chișinău (Moldova)	2–0	(Bulgaria) Litex Lovech
Bălaşa 67'; Cebotari 81' (pen.)	Report

Sheriff Stadium, Tiraspol
Attendance: 3,270
Referee: Robert Malek (Poland)

Zimbru Chișinău won 2–0 on aggregate.

14 August 2003
16:00

Neman Grodno (Belarus)	1–1	(Romania) Steaua București
Dolya 70'	Report	Oprița 89'

Traktor Stadium, Minsk
Attendance: 660
Referee: Rusmir Mrković (Bosnia and Herzegovina)
28 August 2003
19:30

Steaua București (Romania)	0–0	(Belarus) Neman Grodno
	Report

Stadionul Steaua, Bucharest
Attendance: 14,000
Referee: Mark Halsey (England)

1–1 on aggregate; Steaua București won on away goals.

14 August 2003
18:45

Etzella Ettelbruck (Luxembourg)	1–2	(Croatia) Kamen Ingrad
Mischo 21'	Report	Zekić 29', 50'

Stade Am Deich, Ettelbruck
Attendance: 715
Referee: Merab Malagurazde (Georgia)
28 August 2003
20:00

Kamen Ingrad (Croatia)	7–0	(Luxembourg) Etzella Ettelbruck
Bajsić 33' (pen.); Popović 49', 60'; Lisnić 63'; Kovač 68'; Kopunović 82', 87'	Report

Stadion Kamen Ingrad, Velika
Attendance: 2,200
Referee: Viktor Kassai (Hungary)

Kamen Ingrad won 9–1 on aggregate.

14 August 2003
20:45

Manchester City (England)	5–0	(Wales) Total Network Solutions
Sinclair 14'; Wright-Phillips 51'; Sun 60'; Sommeil 73'; Anelka 87'	Report

City of Manchester Stadium, Manchester
Attendance: 34,103
Referee: Alexey Tiumin (Russia)
28 August 2003
20:45

Total Network Solutions (Wales)	0–2	(England) Manchester City
	Report	Negouai 42'; Huckerby 80'

Millennium Stadium, Cardiff
Attendance: 10,123
Referee: Zsolt Szabo (Hungary)

Manchester City won 7–0 on aggregate.

14 August 2003
19:00

Molde (Norway)	2–0	(Faroe Islands) KÍ
Hoseth 35' (pen.); Ljung 37'	Report

Molde Stadion, Molde
Attendance: 868
Referee: Gerald Lehner (Austria)
28 August 2003
20:00

KÍ (Faroe Islands)	0–4	(Norway) Molde
	Report	Hestad 28'; Gustafson 35'; Hulsker 75'; Ljung 89'

Djúpumýra Stadium, Klaksvík
Attendance: 580
Referee: Jouni Hyytiä (Finland)

Molde won 6–0 on aggregate.

14 August 2003
20:00

Odense (Denmark)	1–1	(Estonia) TVMK
Miti 25'	Report	Kurjanov 61'

Odense Stadion, Odense
Attendance: 4,221
Referee: Draženko Kovačić (Croatia)
28 August 2003
18:00

TVMK (Estonia)	0–3	(Denmark) Odense
	Report	Berg 68'; Miti 80', 84'

Lilleküla Stadium, Tallinn
Attendance: 440
Referee: Charlie Richmond (Scotland)

Odense won 4–1 on aggregate.

13 August 2003
17:00

Ventspils (Latvia)	1–1	(Poland) Wisła Płock
Butriks 61'	Report	Gęsior 43'

Ventspils Olimpiskais Stadions, Ventspils
Attendance: 1,504
Referee: Milan Šedivý (Czech Republic)
28 August 2003
18:00

Wisła Płock (Poland)	2–2	(Latvia) Ventspils
Jeleń 13', 41'	Report	Rimkus 51' (pen.); Zangareev 68'

Stadion im. Kazimierza Górskiego, Płock
Attendance: 1,135
Referee: Espen Berntsen (Norway)

3–3 on aggregate; Ventspils won on away goals.

14 August 2003
17:05

MYPA (Finland)	3–2	(Switzerland) Young Boys
Okkonen 2' (pen.), 71' (pen.); Luiz Antônio 23'	Report	Leandro 19'; Magnin 57'

Saviniemen Jalkapallostadion, Anjalankoski
Attendance: 1,515
Referee: Georgios Borovilos (Greece)
28 August 2003
19:30

Young Boys (Switzerland)	2–2	(Finland) MYPA
Sermeter 24', 77'	Report	Luiz Antônio 71'; Taipale 86'

Wankdorf Stadium, Bern
Attendance: 7,264
Referee: Nikolay Ivanov (Russia)

MYPA won 5–4 on aggregate.

14 August 2003
19:30

Vaduz (Liechtenstein)	0–1	(Ukraine) Dnipro Dnipropetrovsk
	Report	Rykun 88'

Rheinpark Stadion, Vaduz
Attendance: 750
Referee: Pavel Saliy (Kazakhstan)
28 August 2003
17:00

Dnipro Dnipropetrovsk (Ukraine)	1–0	(Liechtenstein) Vaduz
Rykun 75'	Report

Meteor Stadium, Dnipropetrovsk
Attendance: 8,500
Referee: Zöhrab Gadiyev (Azerbaijan)

Dnipro Dnipropetrovsk won 2–0 on aggregate.

14 August 2003
19:45

Coleraine (Northern Ireland)	2–1	(Portugal) União de Leiria
Gaston 10'; Hamill 45+1'	Report	João Manuel 43'

The Showgrounds, Coleraine
Attendance: 1,214
Referee: Dimitar Dimitrov (Bulgaria)
28 August 2003
22:00

União de Leiria (Portugal)	5–0	(Northern Ireland) Coleraine
Ludemar 59', 77'; Edson 73', 75'; Caíco 89'	Report

Estádio Municipal da Marinha Grande, Marinha Grande
Attendance: 2,000
Referee: Josef Dvoracek (Czech Republic)

União de Leiria won 6–2 on aggregate.

14 August 2003
20:00

Groclin Grodzisk Wielkopolski (Poland)	2–0	(Lithuania) Atlantas
Rasiak 37', 53'	Report

Stadion Dyskobolia, Grodzisk Wielkopolski
Attendance: 4,000
Referee: Sergey Shmolik (Belarus)
27 August 2003
16:00

Atlantas (Lithuania)	1–4	(Poland) Groclin Grodzisk Wielkopolski
Tarvydas 90'	Report	Rasiak 30'; Križanac 34'; Niedzielan 47', 65'

Žalgiris Stadium, Klaipėda
Attendance: 500
Referee: Drago Kos (Slovenia)

Groclin Grodzisk Wielkopolski won 6–1 on aggregate.

14 August 2003
17:00

Dinamo Tirana (Albania)	0–4	(Belgium) Lokeren
	Report	De Beule 19', 54'; Baldvinsson 40'; van Hoeylandt 45'

Qemal Stafa Stadium, Tirana
Attendance: 1,200
Referee: Haim Yaakov (Israel)
28 August 2003
20:30

Lokeren (Belgium)	3–1	(Albania) Dinamo Tirana
Baldvinsson 29'; Fofana 56', 77'	Report	Xhihani 11'

Daknamstadion, Lokeren
Attendance: 2,013
Referee: Sten Kaldma (Estonia)

Lokeren won 7–1 on aggregate.

14 August 2003
18:45

Cwmbrân Town (Wales)	0–3	(Israel) Maccabi Haifa
	Report	Tal 9'; Zandberg 29'; López 90'

Cwmbran Stadium, Cwmbran
Attendance: 700
Referee: Anthony Zammit (Malta)
28 August 2003
18:45

Maccabi Haifa (Israel)	3–0	(Wales) Cwmbrân Town
Katan 33'; Roso 45'; Zandberg 61'	Report

İzmir Alsancak Stadium, İzmir, Turkey
Attendance: 141
Referee: Roland Beck (Liechtenstein)

Maccabi Haifa won 6–0 on aggregate.

14 August 2003
17:30

Publikum (Slovenia)	7–2	(North Macedonia) Belasica
Križnik 6'; Brulc 11', 21'; Maletić 35'; Čadikovski 47', 60'; Robnik 82'	Report	Baldovaliev 49', 85' (pen.)

Arena Petrol, Celje
Attendance: 740
Referee: Levan Paniashvili (Georgia)
28 August 2003
16:30

Belasica (North Macedonia)	0–5	(Slovenia) Publikum
	Report	Budimir 30'; Križnik 37'; Čadikovski 64'; Kvas 72'; Plastovski 75'

Stadion Mladost, Strumica
Attendance: 250
Referee: Adrian Casha (Malta)

Publikum won 12–2 on aggregate.

14 August 2003
17:00

Cementarnica 55 (North Macedonia)	0–0	(Poland) GKS Katowice
	Report

Gradski stadion, Skopje
Attendance: 1,000
Referee: Mark Courtney (Northern Ireland)
28 August 2003
21:00

GKS Katowice (Poland)	1–1	(North Macedonia) Cementarnica 55
Kowalczyk 57'	Report	Bajramovski 24'

Stadion GKS Katowice, Katowice
Attendance: 1,530
Referee: Brage Sandmoen (Norway)

1–1 on aggregate; Cementarnica 55 won on away goals.

14 August 2003
17:00

Matador Púchov (Slovakia)	3–0	(Georgia (country)) Sioni Bolnisi
Breška 48', 90'; Perniš 79'	Report

Mestský štadión, Púchov
Attendance: 3,825
Referee: Anton Genov (Bulgaria)
28 August 2003
14:30

Sioni Bolnisi (Georgia (country))	0–3	(Slovakia) Matador Púchov
	Report	Nemec 17', 34'; Gegić 45'

Tamaz Stepania Stadium, Bolnisi
Attendance: 2,200
Referee: Dejan Stanišić (Serbia and Montenegro)

Matador Púchov won 6–1 on aggregate.

14 August 2003
19:00

Red Star Belgrade (Serbia and Montenegro)	5–0	(Moldova) Nistru Otaci
Žigić 8', 20', 49'; Vidić 45' (pen.); Bošković 46'	Report

Red Star Stadium, Belgrade
Attendance: 10,594
Referee: Peter Sippel (Germany)
28 August 2003
17:00

Nistru Otaci (Moldova)	2–3	(Serbia and Montenegro) Red Star Belgrade
Bursuc 27', 65'	Report	Bogavac 2'; Krivokapić 10'; Perović 87'

Stadionul Republican, Chișinău
Attendance: 500
Referee: Wolfgang Sowa (Austria)

Red Star Belgrade won 8–2 on aggregate.

14 August 2003
17:00

Ekranas (Lithuania)	1–1	(Hungary) Debrecen
Lukšys 17'	Report	Bajzát 74'

Aukštaitija Stadium, Panevėžys
Attendance: 3,100
Referee: Peter Vervecken (Belgium)
28 August 2003
19:00

Debrecen (Hungary)	2–1 (a.e.t.)	(Lithuania) Ekranas
Bajzát 41', 97'	Report	Kavaliauskas 60'

Oláh Gábor utcai Stadion, Debrecen
Attendance: 6,300
Referee: Albano Janku (Albania)

Debrecen won 3–2 on aggregate.

14 August 2003
19:45

Birkirkara (Malta)	0–5	(Hungary) Ferencváros
	Report	Rósa 31', 90'; Jović 55', 60'; Gera 73'

Ta'Qali National Stadium, Ta' Qali
Attendance: 1,213
Referee: David McKeon (Northern Ireland)
28 August 2003
20:00

Ferencváros (Hungary)	1–0	(Malta) Birkirkara
Dragóner 90'	Report

Üllői úti stadion, Budapest
Attendance: 0 (Note: The match was played behind closed doors.)
Referee: Stefan Johannesson (Sweden)

Ferencváros won 6–0 on aggregate.

12 August 2003
17:05

Haka (Finland)	2–1	(Croatia) Hajduk Split
Popovitch 14'; Ristilä 42'	Report	Krpan 2'

Tehtaan kenttä, Valkeakoski
Attendance: 2,068
Referee: Eric Blareau (Belgium)
28 August 2003
20:15

Hajduk Split (Croatia)	1–0	(Finland) Haka
Računica 9'	Report

Stadion Poljud, Split
Attendance: 9,929
Referee: António Almeida Costa (Portugal)

2–2 on aggregate; Hajduk Split won on away goals.

14 August 2003
18:00

Torpedo Moscow (Russia)	5–0	(San Marino) Domagnano
Volkov 22'; Shirko 30', 56'; Osipov 49'; Zyryanov 87'	Report

Luzhniki Stadium, Moscow
Attendance: 900
Referee: Egill Markusson (Iceland)
28 August 2003
20:30

Domagnano (San Marino)	0–4	(Russia) Torpedo Moscow
	Report	Leonchenko 38' (pen.); Samusiovas 60'; Volkov 62'; Oper 71'

Stadio Olimpico, Serravalle
Attendance: 614
Referee: Robert Johnsdorf (Luxembourg)

Torpedo Moscow won 9–0 on aggregate.

14 August 2003
13:30

Atyrau (Kazakhstan)	1–4	(Bulgaria) Levski Sofia
Agabaýew 88'	Report	Chilikov 9'; Ivanov 13', 33'; Temile 20'

Munayshy Stadium, Atyrau
Attendance: 7,800
Referee: Ali Aydin (Turkey)
28 August 2003
18:30

Levski Sofia (Bulgaria)	2–0	(Kazakhstan) Atyrau
G. Ivanov 27'; Telkiyski 69'	Report

Georgi Asparuhov Stadium, Sofia
Attendance: 4,041
Referee: Olegário Benquerença (Portugal)

Levski Sofia won 6–1 on aggregate.

14 August 2003
20:00

Olimpija Ljubljana (Slovenia)	1–0	(Republic of Ireland) Shelbourne
Jusufbegović 73'	Report

Bežigrad Stadium, Ljubljana
Attendance: 2,000
Referee: Krzysztof Slupik (Poland)
28 August 2003
20:45

Shelbourne (Republic of Ireland)	2–3	(Slovenia) Olimpija Ljubljana
Cahill 14'; Byrne 90'	Report	Jusufbegović 8'; Žlogar 45'; Kmetec 56'

Tolka Park, Dublin
Attendance: 3,011
Referee: Gylfi Orrasson (Iceland)

Olimpija Ljubljana won 4–2 on aggregate.

14 August 2003
20:00

Lens (France)	3–0	(Georgia (country)) Torpedo Kutaisi
Moreira 69'; Utaka 82'; Diop 85'	Report

Stade Félix-Bollaert, Lens
Attendance: 26,443
Referee: Dietmar Drabek (Austria)
28 August 2003
17:00

Torpedo Kutaisi (Georgia (country))	0–2	(France) Lens
	Report	Bakari 35', 41'

Central Stadium, Kutaisi
Attendance: 3,000
Referee: Ferenc Bede (Hungary)

Lens won 5–0 on aggregate.

14 August 2003
19:00

Nordsjælland (Denmark)	4–0	(Armenia) Shirak
Sørensen 12', 45', 48'; Rasmussen 56'	Report

Farum Park, Farum
Attendance: 2,363
Referee: Ghenadie Orlic (Moldova)
28 August 2003
15:00

Shirak (Armenia)	0–2	(Denmark) Nordsjælland
	Report	Rasmussen 43', 89'

Gyumri City Stadium, Gyumri
Attendance: 1,250
Referee: Richard Havrilla (Slovakia)

Nordsjælland won 6–0 on aggregate.

14 August 2003
18:00

Artmedia Petržalka (Slovakia)	1–0	(Luxembourg) F91 Dudelange
Ďurica 14'	Report

Štadión Petržalka, Bratislava
Attendance: 2,130
Referee: Alfonso Pérez Burrull (Spain)
28 August 2003
17:00

F91 Dudelange (Luxembourg)	0–1	(Slovakia) Artmedia Petržalka
	Report	Ďurica 87'

Stade Jos Nosbaum, Dudelange
Attendance: 1,063
Referee: Panagiotis Gerasimou (Cyprus)

Artmedia Petržalka won 2–0 on aggregate.

14 August 2003
20:00

NSÍ (Faroe Islands)	1–3	(Norway) Lyn
Hansen 87'	Report	Sundgot 22'; Guðmundsson 38'; Sigurðsson 80'

Svangaskarð, Toftir
Attendance: 816
Referee: Igor Egorov (Russia)
28 August 2003
19:00

Lyn (Norway)	6–0	(Faroe Islands) NSÍ
Hadžimehmedović 11', 31', 42', 49', 50', 58'	Report

Ullevaal Stadion, Oslo
Attendance: 532
Referee: Raivo Lattik (Estonia)

Lyn won 9–1 on aggregate.
