= 2008 Armenian Cup =

Tournament details
- Country: Armenia
- Teams: 14

Final positions
- Champions: Ararat
- Runners-up: Banants
- UEFA Europa League: Banants

Tournament statistics
- Matches played: 25
- Goals scored: 80 (3.2 per match)

The 2008 Armenian Cup was the 17th edition of the Armenian Cup, a football competition. In 2008, the tournament had 14 participants, out of which 6 were reserve teams.

== Summary ==
Banants and Ararat got a pass on the 1st round because these two clubs reached the final the previous year. The first round passed without any surprises, as the reserve teams were expected to be knocked out. The quarter finals, however, turned out to be very interesting. Two of the matches had to be decided on penalties. Gandzasar put up quite a fight against defending Armenian Premier League champions Pyunik, and even managed to outplay the champions in various aspects of the game. Shirak also demonstrated a fighting spirit and managed to defeat defending cup holders Banants away, after losing the first leg at home. Luck turned Banants' way as the match was won only on penalties. The semifinals also turned out to be interesting as Banants and Ararat defeated Mika and Pyunik respectively with an aggregate score of 5–1. The final was a repeat of last year's final and this time it was Ararat that edged out on top as Marcos Pizzeli managed to sneak a late extra-time winner for the five-time Armenian Independence Cup winners. The victory gave Ararat an opportunity to participate in the 2008–09 UEFA Cup, First qualifying round.

== Results ==
=== First round ===
The first legs were played on 21 March 2008. The second legs were played on 28 March 2008.

Team 1	Agg.	Team 2	1st leg	2nd leg
Banants-2	2–6	Ulisses	1–4	1–2
Pyunik	15–2	Patani	11–2	4–0
Gandzasar	8–0	Pyunik-2	3–0	5–0
Kilikia	5–2	Mika-2	2–0	3–2
Mika	11–0	Ararat-2	7–0	4–0
Shengavit	2–3	Shirak	1–3	1–0

=== Quarter-finals ===
The first legs were played on 3 April 2008. The second legs were played on 10 April 2008.

Team 1	Agg.	Team 2	1st leg	2nd leg
Ararat Yerevan	2–1	Ulisses	0–1	2–0
Pyunik	0–0 (4–1 p)	Gandzasar	0–0	0–0
Kilikia	1–3	Mika	0–1	1–2
Shirak	1–1 (5–6 p)	Banants	0–1	1–0

=== Semi-finals ===
The first legs were played on 14 April 2008. The second legs were played on 23 April 2008.

Team 1	Agg.	Team 2	1st leg	2nd leg
Ararat Yerevan	5–1	Pyunik	2–1	3–0
Mika	1–5	Banants	1–3	0–2

=== Final ===
9 May 2008
17:00 (WAST)

Ararat Yerevan	2 – 1 (a.e.t.)	Banants
V. Minasyan 75'; Pizzelli 115'		Ganchev 36'

Arnar Stadium, Ijevan
Attendance: 2,500
Referee: Ararat Chagharian (Yerevan)

FC ARARAT YEREVAN:
GK	1	(Armenia) Nikolay Sargsyan
DF	20	(Armenia) Vahe Mehrabyan	(yellow card) 4'	(substituted off) 60'
DF	19	(Armenia) Vahagn Minasyan
DF	5	(Armenia) Hrayr Mkoyan
MF	18	(Armenia) Artur Petrosyan		(substituted off) 116'
MF	7	(Armenia) Artur Minasyan (c)	(yellow card) 101'
MF	3	(Brazil) Renato de Morais	(yellow card) 45+1'
MF	6	(Armenia) Karen Navoyan
MF	15	(Armenia) Marcos Pizzeli
FW	9	(Armenia) Sergey Erzrumyan	(yellow card) 78'	(substituted off) 95'
FW	2	(Armenia) Sargis Movsisyan
Substitutes:
GK	16	(Mexico) Sergio Ramírez
DF	14	(Armenia) Vachagan Karapetyan
DF	8	(Armenia) Andranik Tadeosyan		(substituted on) 95'
DF	12	(Brazil) Emilio Palucci		(substituted on) 116'
DF	17	(Armenia) Artak Grigoryan
FW	21	(Armenia) Edgar Safaryan		(substituted on) 60'
FW	11	(Armenia) Gevorg Nranyan
Manager:
(Armenia) Varuzhan Sukiasyan

FC BANANTS:
GK	1	(Moldova) Yevgeni Matyugin	(yellow card) 89'
DF	10	(Armenia) Yegishe Melikyan (c)
DF	15	(Ukraine) Andriy Cherevko	(yellow card) 119'
DF	6	(Ukraine) Andriy Burdian
DF	3	(Armenia) Gagik Daghbashyan		(substituted off) 77'
MF	5	(Armenia) Romik Khachatryan		(substituted off) 46'
MF	13	(Uganda) Noah Kasule	(yellow card) 73'
MF	25	(Armenia) Karen Aleksanyan	(yellow card) 4' (yellow-red card) 119'
MF	8	(Bulgaria) Marko Ganchev	(yellow card) 3'
FW	19	(Bulgaria) Plamen Krumov
FW	17	(Bulgaria) Semion Zlatev		(substituted off) 72'
Substitutes:
GK	22	(Armenia) Stepan Ghazaryan
DF	20	(Armenia) Hovhannes Grigoryan		(substituted on) 46'
MF	4	(Armenia) Aghvan Hayrapetyan	(yellow card) 118'	(substituted on) 77'
MF	7	(Armenia) Romeo Jenebyan
MF	9	(Armenia) Aram Bareghamyan
MF	23	(Armenia) Eduard Kakosyan
FW	11	(Armenia) Arsen Balabekyan		(substituted on) 72'
Manager:
(Bulgaria) Nedelcho Matushev

MATCH RULES

- 90 minutes.
- 30 minutes of extra-time if necessary.
- Penalty shootout if scores still level.
- Seven named substitutes
- Maximum of 3 substitutions.

== See also ==
- 2008 Armenian Premier League
- 2008 Armenian First League
