= 1998 in Armenian football =

Premier League champions
- Tsement Ararat

First League champions
- Zvartnots-AAL

Armenian Cup winners
- Tsement Ararat

1998 in Armenian football was the seventh season of independent football after the split-up from the Soviet Union. The Armenian Premier League for 1998 existed of ten teams of which the top six would qualify for the championship stage, while the other four would enter the relegation stage.

== Premier League ==
- Aragats FC is promoted.
- FC Kotayk were expelled for not paying taxes.

=== First stage league table ===
Pos	Team	Pld	W	D	L	GF	GA	GD	Pts	Qualification
1	Shirak	16	13	3	0	41	8	+33	42	Qualification for the Championship round
2	Tsement Ararat	16	12	3	1	43	10	+33	39	Qualification for the Championship round
3	Yerevan	16	8	3	5	25	16	+9	27	Qualification for the Championship round
4	Erebuni-Homenmen	16	7	4	5	19	13	+6	25	Qualification for the Championship round
5	Ararat Yerevan	16	5	5	6	14	18	−4	20	Qualification for the Championship round
6	Pyunik	16	5	3	8	17	28	−11	18	Qualification for the Championship round
7	Dvin Artashat	16	4	5	7	19	24	−5	17	Qualification for the Relegation round
8	Karabakh Yerevan	16	2	5	9	14	28	−14	11	Qualification for the Relegation round
9	Aragats	16	0	1	15	6	53	−47	1	Qualification for the Relegation round
10	Kotayk (W)	0	–	–	–	–	–	—	0	Expelled (Note: Kotayk were expelled from the competition because did not pay the start tax.)

(W) Withdrew

==== Results ====
Home \ Away	ARG	ARA	DVI	ERE	KAR	PYU	SHI	TSE	YER
Aragats		0–1	0–2	1–3	0–0	1–2	2–3	1–6	0–3
Ararat Yerevan	3–0		2–2	3–1	2–1	2–3	0–0	0–4	0–2
Dvin Artashat	3–0	2–2		0–2	4–2	3–1	1–1	1–3	0–1
Erebuni-Homenmen	4–0	2–1	0–0		2–0	0–0	0–3	1–1	2–1
Karabakh Yerevan	5–1	1–1	3–0	0–0		1–1	0–3	1–2	1–4
Pyunik	3–0	0–1	3–2	1–2	2–1		0–1	1–1	0–1
Shirak	5–0	3–0	4–0	2–1	3–1	6–1		3–1	1–0
Tsement Ararat	6–0	2–0	2–0	3–1	3–0	3–0 (Note: Pyunik did not enter the match.)	2–2		3–0
Yerevan	4–0	0–0	4–4	2–1	1–1	4–0	0–2	0–2	

Legend: Blue = home team win; Yellow = draw; Red = away team win.

=== Championship stage league table ===
Pos	Team	Pld	W	D	L	GF	GA	GD	Pts	Qualification
1	Tsement Ararat (C)	26	20	4	2	70	22	+48	64	Qualification for the Champions League first qualifying round
2	Shirak	26	19	4	3	72	25	+47	61	Qualification for the UEFA Cup qualifying round
3	Yerevan	26	15	3	8	47	30	+17	48	Qualification for the UEFA Cup qualifying round
4	Ararat Yerevan	26	10	5	11	40	40	0	35	Qualification for the Intertoto Cup first round
5	Erebuni-Homenmen	26	9	4	13	39	44	−5	31	
6	Pyunik	26	6	3	17	27	68	−41	21	

(C) Champions

==== Results ====
Home \ Away	ARA	ERE	PYU	SHI	TSE	YER
Ararat Yerevan		2–1	2–1	3–1	2–3	1–3
Erebuni-Homenmen	4–1		1–2	4–5	1–3	0–1
Pyunik	0–4	0–2		1–6	1–3	0–5
Shirak	3–1	6–2	5–0		1–1	3–0 (Note: Yerevan did not enter the match.)
Tsement Ararat	1–0	5–1	6–3	1–0		2–0
Yerevan	0–4	2–1	5–1	3–0	2–1	

Legend: Blue = home team win; Yellow = draw; Red = away team win.

=== Relegation stage league table ===
Pos	Team	Pld	W	D	L	GF	GA	GD	Pts	Qualification
7	Dvin Artashat	20	8	5	7	41	36	+5	29	
8	Karabakh Yerevan	20	4	5	11	24	37	−13	17	
9	Aragats (O)	20	0	1	19	10	68	−58	1	Qualification for the Relegation play-off

(O) Play-off winners

==== Results ====
Home \ Away	ARG	DVI	KAR
Aragats		1–3	0–2
Dvin Artashat	6–3		4–1
Karabakh Yerevan	2–0	1–4	

Legend: Blue = home team win; Yellow = draw; Red = away team win.

== Promotion and relegation play-off ==
Date	Venue	PL Team	Result	FL Team	Information
unknown	unknown	FC Shirak 2	3-2	Lori Vanadzor	FC Shirak 2 remains in Premier League.

=== Top goalscorers ===
		Player	Team	Goals
1	(Armenia)	Ara Hakobyan	Dvin Artashat	20
2	(Armenia)	Arayik Adamyan	Shirak	13
3	(Armenia)	Arthur Petrosyan	Shirak	12
	(Armenia)	Shirak Sarikyan	Tsement	12
5	(Armenia)	Mher Avanesyan	Shirak	11
	(Armenia)	Hayk Hakopyan	Dvin Artashat	11

== First League ==
- Alashkert Martuni, FIMA Yerevan, and FC Nig Aparan returned to professional football.
- Aragats Ashtarak are renamed back to Kasakh Ashtarak.
- Dinamo Yerevan are renamed Dinamo-Energo Yerevan.
- SKVV Yerevan and FC Moush Kasakh are introduced to the league.

=== League table ===
Pos	Team	Pld	W	D	L	GF	GA	GD	Pts	Promotion or qualification
1	Zvartnots-AAL	24	21	3	0	92	18	+74	66	Promoted to Armenian Premier League
2	Lori	24	16	6	2	42	16	+26	54	Forced to play the promotion/relegation play-off
3	Nairit	24	17	2	5	48	24	+24	53	
4	Moush Kasakh	24	13	3	8	39	29	+10	42	
5	Lernagorts Kapan	24	12	2	10	37	32	+5	38	
6	Alashkert Martuni	24	9	8	7	30	25	+5	35	
7	SKVV Yerevan	24	10	3	11	49	39	+10	33	
8	FIMA Yerevan	24	9	3	12	48	40	+8	30	
9	Kasakh	24	8	4	12	30	44	−14	28	
10	Spitak	24	9	1	14	35	50	−15	28	
11	Dinamo-Energo Yerevan	24	6	1	17	26	65	−39	19	
12	Karabakh-2 Yerevan	24	4	3	17	12	47	−35	15	
13	Nig Aparan	24	2	1	21	13	67	−54	7	
14	BMA-Arai Echmiadzin	0	–	–	–	–	–	—	0	Withdrew from competition

Source: rsssf.com

== Armenia Cup ==
Quarter finals		
Ararat Yerevan	0 - 3; 1 - 2	Yerevan
Tsement	1 - 1; 1 - 0	Shirak
Karabakh Yerevan	1 - 5; 0 - 1	Pyunik
SKVV Yerevan	0 - 4; 0 - 3	Erebuni-Homenmen
Semi finals		
Yerevan	*0 - 0	Pyunik
Erebuni-Homenmen	0 - 1	Tsement
Final		
Tsement	3 - 1	Yerevan
