= 1998 Armenian Cup =

Tournament details
- Country: Armenia
- Teams: 17

Final positions
- Champions: Tsement
- Runners-up: Yerevan

Tournament statistics
- Matches played: 22
- Goals scored: 72 (3.27 per match)

The 1998 Armenian Cup was the seventh edition of the Armenian Cup, a football competition. In 1998, the tournament had 17 participants, out of which only one was a reserve team.

== Results ==
=== Preliminary round ===
The match was played on 6 March 1998.

Team 1	Score	Team 2
Alashkert	0–2	SKVV

=== First round ===
The first legs were played on 10 March 1998. The second legs were played on 15 March 1998.

Team 1	Agg.	Team 2	1st leg	2nd leg
Shirak	8–2	Shirak-2	5–0	3–2
Spitak	0–3	Ararat Yerevan	0–0	0–3
Pyunik	3–1	Zvartnots-AAL	2–1	1–0
Erebuni	16–0	Dinamo Yerevan	5–0	11–0
Dvin Artashat	2–6	Yerevan	1–3	1–3
Tsement	w/o	Lori	n/a	n/a
SKVV	w/o	Kotayk	n/a	n/a
Karabakh	w/o	Aragats	n/a	n/a

=== Quarter-finals ===
The first legs were played on 10 and 11 April 1998. The second legs were played on 25 April 1998.

Team 1	Agg.	Team 2	1st leg	2nd leg
Ararat Yerevan	1–5	Yerevan	0–3	1–2
SKVV	0–7	Erebuni	0–4	0–3
Tsement	2–1	Shirak	1–1	1–0
Karabakh	1–6	Pyunik	1–5	0–1

=== Semi-finals ===
The matches were played on 9 May 1998.

Team 1	Score	Team 2
Yerevan	0–0*	Pyunik
Erebuni	0–1	Tsement

- Yerevan advanced to the final after the draw.

=== Final ===
31 May 1998

Tsement	3 – 1	Yerevan
Manukyan 32'; Srakisyan 37'; Okhoyan 66'		Minasyan 90'

Hrazdan Stadium, Yerevan
Attendance: 4,000
Referee: Kazaryan (Yerevan)

== See also ==
- 1998 Armenian Premier League
