= Spitak (disambiguation) =

Spitak (Armenian: Սպիտակ) is a town in the northern Lori Province of Armenia.

Spitak may also refer to:

- Spitak district, a former administrative district around Spitak (1937—1995)
- Spitak Pass, Armenia
- Spitak River, a tributary of Chknakh in Debed river basin
- Spitak earthquake
- Spitak (film), a 2018 Armenian film
