= 1999 in Armenian football =

Premier League champions
- Shirak

First League champions
- Dinamo Yerevan

Armenian Cup winners
- Tsement

1999 in Armenian football was the eighth season of independent football after the split-up from the Soviet Union. The Armenian Premier League for 1999 existed of 10 teams of which the three lowest ranked teams would relegate to the Armenian First League. The seventh ranked team would enter the promotion/relegation play-off with the second ranked team of the First League. Only the winner of that competition was promoted directly.

== Premier League ==
- Zvartnots-AAL are promoted.
- Kilikia F.C. returned to professional football.
- Erebuni-Homenmen changed their name to Erebuni FC.
- Shirak-2 changed their name to FC Gyumri.
- Karabakh were relocated from Yerevan to Stepanakert.

Pos	Team	Pld	W	D	L	GF	GA	GD	Pts	Qualification or relegation
1	Shirak (C)	32	23	4	5	93	29	+64	73	Qualification for the Champions League first qualifying round
2	Ararat Yerevan	32	22	6	4	63	21	+42	72	Qualification for the UEFA Cup qualifying round
3	Tsement Ararat	32	22	5	5	78	19	+59	71	Qualification for the Intertoto Cup First round
4	Zvartnots-AAL	32	16	6	10	50	38	+12	54	
5	Yerevan	32	15	6	11	60	43	+17	51	
6	Erebuni-Homenmen	32	12	5	15	41	44	−3	41	
7	Kilikia (R)	32	10	4	18	57	55	+2	34	Qualification for the Relegation play-off
8	Dvin Artashat (R)	32	2	2	28	20	116	−96	8	Relegation to First League
9	Gyumri (R)	32	2	2	28	23	120	−97	8	Relegation to First League
10	Karabakh Stepanakert (W)	0	0	0	0	0	0	0	0	Expelled (Note: Karabakh Stepanakert were expelled during the season due to financial trouble.)

(C) Champions; (R) Relegated; (W) Withdrew

=== Promotion and relegation play-off ===
Date	Venue	PL Team	Result	FL Team	Information
12 December	Armavir	Kilikia	0-1	Mika-Kasakh Ashtarak	Mika-Kasakh Ashtarak promoted, Kilikia relegated.

=== Top goalscorers ===
		Player	Team	Goals
1	(Armenia)	Shirak Sarikyan	Tsement	21
2	(Armenia)	Arman Karamyan	Kilikia	20
3	(Armenia)	Arayik Adamyan	Shirak	16
	(Armenia)	Mher Avanesyan	Zvartnots-AAL	16
	(Armenia)	Kolya Yepranosyan	Shirak	16

== First League ==
- Dinamo-Energo Yerevan changed its name back to Dinamo Yerevan.
- Arpa returned to professional football.
- In the middle of the season, FC Kasakh was dissolved and its position was taken over with a newly founded FC Mika-Kasakh.

Pos	Team	Pld	W	D	L	GF	GA	GD	Pts	Promotion or qualification
1	Dinamo Yerevan	16	13	0	3	40	14	+26	39	Promoted to the Armenian Premier League
2	Mika-Kasakh	16	11	2	3	34	18	+16	35	Forced to play the promotion/relegation play-off
3	Lori	16	9	4	3	32	10	+22	31	
4	Lernagorts Kapan	16	7	4	5	41	16	+25	25	
5	Nairit	16	7	3	6	23	25	−2	24	
6	Karabakh-2 Stepanakert	16	7	2	7	18	19	−1	23	
7	FIMA Yerevan	16	4	3	9	12	31	−19	15	
8	Arpa	16	2	2	12	11	46	−35	8	
9	Moush Kasakh	16	1	2	13	6	42	−36	5	
10	Alashkert	0	–	–	–	–	–	—	0	Withdrew from competition
11	SKVV Yerevan	0	–	–	–	–	–	—	0	Withdrew from competition
12	Nig Aparan	0	–	–	–	–	–	—	0	Withdrew from competition

Source: rsssf.com

== Armenia Cup ==
Quarter finals
Dvin Artashat	0 - 4; 0 - 2	Tsement
Yerevan	1 - 0; 1 - 2	Kilikia
Ararat Yerevan	1 - 1; 0 - 1	Erebuni
Zvartnots-AAL	2 - 1; 0 - 1	Shirak
Semi finals
Erebuni	2 - 4; 2 - 3	Tsement
Shirak	3 - 1; 0 - 1	Yerevan
Final
Tsement	3 - 2	Shirak
