= 1998 Armenian Premier League =

Football league season

Statistics of Armenian Premier League in the 1998 season.

- Aragats FC of Gyumri is promoted.

== Regular season ==
=== League table ===
Pos	Team	Pld	W	D	L	GF	GA	GD	Pts	Qualification
1	Shirak	16	13	3	0	41	8	+33	42	Qualification for the Championship round
2	Tsement Ararat	16	12	3	1	43	10	+33	39	Qualification for the Championship round
3	Yerevan	16	8	3	5	25	16	+9	27	Qualification for the Championship round
4	Erebuni-Homenmen	16	7	4	5	19	13	+6	25	Qualification for the Championship round
5	Ararat Yerevan	16	5	5	6	14	18	−4	20	Qualification for the Championship round
6	Pyunik	16	5	3	8	17	28	−11	18	Qualification for the Championship round
7	Dvin Artashat	16	4	5	7	19	24	−5	17	Qualification for the Relegation round
8	Karabakh Yerevan	16	2	5	9	14	28	−14	11	Qualification for the Relegation round
9	Aragats	16	0	1	15	6	53	−47	1	Qualification for the Relegation round
10	Kotayk (W)	0	–	–	–	–	–	—	0	Expelled (Note: Kotayk were expelled from the competition because did not pay the start tax.)

(W) Withdrew

==== Results ====
Home \ Away	ARG	ARA	DVI	ERE	KAR	PYU	SHI	TSE	YER
Aragats		0–1	0–2	1–3	0–0	1–2	2–3	1–6	0–3
Ararat Yerevan	3–0		2–2	3–1	2–1	2–3	0–0	0–4	0–2
Dvin Artashat	3–0	2–2		0–2	4–2	3–1	1–1	1–3	0–1
Erebuni-Homenmen	4–0	2–1	0–0		2–0	0–0	0–3	1–1	2–1
Karabakh Yerevan	5–1	1–1	3–0	0–0		1–1	0–3	1–2	1–4
Pyunik	3–0	0–1	3–2	1–2	2–1		0–1	1–1	0–1
Shirak	5–0	3–0	4–0	2–1	3–1	6–1		3–1	1–0
Tsement Ararat	6–0	2–0	2–0	3–1	3–0	3–0 (Note: Pyunik did not enter the match.)	2–2		3–0
Yerevan	4–0	0–0	4–4	2–1	1–1	4–0	0–2	0–2	

Legend: Blue = home team win; Yellow = draw; Red = away team win.

== Championship round ==
=== Championship round league table ===
Pos	Team	Pld	W	D	L	GF	GA	GD	Pts	Qualification
1	Tsement Ararat (C)	26	20	4	2	70	22	+48	64	Qualification for the Champions League first qualifying round
2	Shirak	26	19	4	3	72	25	+47	61	Qualification for the UEFA Cup qualifying round
3	Yerevan	26	15	3	8	47	30	+17	48	Qualification for the UEFA Cup qualifying round
4	Ararat Yerevan	26	10	5	11	40	40	0	35	Qualification for the Intertoto Cup first round
5	Erebuni-Homenmen	26	9	4	13	39	44	−5	31	
6	Pyunik	26	6	3	17	27	68	−41	21	

(C) Champions

==== Results ====
Home \ Away	ARA	ERE	PYU	SHI	TSE	YER
Ararat Yerevan		2–1	2–1	3–1	2–3	1–3
Erebuni-Homenmen	4–1		1–2	4–5	1–3	0–1
Pyunik	0–4	0–2		1–6	1–3	0–5
Shirak	3–1	6–2	5–0		1–1	3–0 (Note: Yerevan did not enter the match.)
Tsement Ararat	1–0	5–1	6–3	1–0		2–0
Yerevan	0–4	2–1	5–1	3–0	2–1	

Legend: Blue = home team win; Yellow = draw; Red = away team win.

== Relegation round ==
=== Relegation round league table ===
Pos	Team	Pld	W	D	L	GF	GA	GD	Pts	Qualification
7	Dvin Artashat	20	8	5	7	41	36	+5	29	
8	Karabakh Yerevan	20	4	5	11	24	37	−13	17	
9	Aragats (O)	20	0	1	19	10	68	−58	1	Qualification for the Relegation play-off

(O) Play-off winners

==== Results ====
Home \ Away	ARG	DVI	KAR
Aragats		1–3	0–2
Dvin Artashat	6–3		4–1
Karabakh Yerevan	2–0	1–4	

Legend: Blue = home team win; Yellow = draw; Red = away team win.

== Promotion/relegation play-off ==
Date	Venue	PL Team	Result	FL Team
unknown	unknown	Aragats	3 - 2	Lori

== Top goalscorers ==
#	Player		Team	Goals
1	(Armenia)	Ara Hakobyan	Dvin Artashat	20
2	(Armenia)	Arayik Adamyan	Shirak	13
3	(Armenia)	Arthur Petrosyan	Shirak	12
3	(Armenia)	Shirak Sarikyan	Tsement Ararat	12
5	(Armenia)	Mher Avanesyan	Shirak	11
5	(Armenia)	Hayk Hakopyan	Dvin Artashat	11

== See also ==
- 1998 in Armenian football
- 1998 Armenian First League
- 1998 Armenian Cup
