= Romik Khachatryan =

Armenian footballer

Personal information
- Date of birth: 23 August 1978 (age 48)
- Place of birth: Yerevan, Soviet Union
- Height: 1.70 m (5 ft 7 in)
- Position: Midfielder

Senior career*
Years	Team	Apps	(Gls)
1995–1998	Kilikia Yerevan	22	(4)
1999–2000	Araks Ararat	42	(3)
2000–2002	Olympiakos Nicosia	34	(3)
2002–2003	APOEL	20	(1)
2003–2004	Olympiakos Nicosia	27	(3)
2004–2006	OFI	33	(0)
2006	Anorthosis Famagusta	15	(2)
2007	Unirea Urziceni	18	(0)
2007–2008	Universitatea Cluj-Napoca	18	(0)
2008	APOP Kinyras Peyias	15	(0)
2008–2009	Banants Yerevan	16	(0)
2009–2010	AEP Paphos	29	(0)
2011	Omonia Aradippou	22	(5)
2012–2013	Lokomotiv Tashkent	19	(0)

International career^{‡}
1997–2008	Armenia	54	(1)
- * Club domestic league appearances and goals as of 1 May 2010 ‡ National team caps and goals as of 10 September 2008

Romik Khachatryan (Armenian: Ռոմիկ Խաչատրյան; born 23 August 1978 in Yerevan) is an Armenian retired football player. He was formerly a member of the Armenia national team.

== Club career ==
Romik Khachatryan began to get involved in football at age 7. Khachatryan began his youth career in SKA-Arai Echmiadzin. The then 16-year-old player played for the club for 11 games and was able to score 2 goals in the 1994 season. The club performed poorly that season, taking 14th place in the Armenian Premier League and was sent to the Armenian First League. Khachatryan joined Kilikia Yerevan. The club, who were soon merged with Pyunik Yerevan, played in season informal and formal, respectively. Following 1996, he joined BKMA Yerevan and stayed at the club for a long time. His first season for the club was initially not good. They had 7 defeats at the start of the Premier League. In the first round, the team finished with one win and 10 losses. Moreover, after the first match of the second round, the club withdrew from the championship and disbanded. Khachatryan himself played only three games and returned to Pyunik. From this period, Khachatryan went to take his career elsewhere. Successful performance for the club provided the opportunity to play in the Armenia national team. At the end of the 1998 Armenian Premier League, he made a transition into Araks Ararat. His skills developed in the new club and he was allowed half of the season to move to the Cypriot First Division. He played for Cypriot clubs Olympiakos Nicosia, APOEL and Anorthosis Famagusta. He also returned to Armenia to play for Banants Yerevan, which made it to the finals of the 2008 Armenian Cup. Khachatryan currently plays for Lokomotiv Tashkent.

== International career ==
Khachatryan played in 54 matches in the Armenia national football team. He made his debut on 30 March 1997 in Tbilisi in a friendly game between Armenia and Georgia. In this match, Khachatryan substituted in, replacing Arthur Petrosyan at the 60th minute of the match. The Armenian team suffered a devastating defeat 0:7. To his credit, he had scored a goal once in a match against Andorra. Khachatryan has played the 7th most games for the national team.

== Personal life ==
Romik was born to parents Akop and Manushak. He is married and has two children, twins Eric and Helen.

== National team statistics ==
Armenia national team
Year	Apps	Goals
1997	1	0
1998	0	0
1999	4	0
2000	9	0
2001	6	0
2002	4	0
2003	6	0
2004	7	0
2005	8	1
2006	2	0
2007	6	0
2008	3	0
Total	56	1

== Honours ==
=== Club ===
Pyunik Yerevan

- Armenian Premier League (2): 1995–96, 1996–97
- Armenian Cup (1): 1996
- Armenian Supercup (1): 1997
- Armenian Cup Runner-up (1): 1997

Spartak Yerevan

- Armenian Premier League 3rd place (1): 1999
- Armenian Cup (1): 1999
- Armenian Supercup Runner-up (1): 1999

Banants Yerevan

- Armenian Cup Runner-up (1): 2008

Olympiakos Nicosia

- Cypriot First Division Runner-up (1): 2000–01

APOEL Nicosia

- Cypriot Super Cup (1): 2002

Anorthosis Famagusta

- Cypriot Cup (1): 2006–07
