= 1999 Armenian Premier League =

Football league season

Statistics of Armenian Premier League in the 1999 season.

- Zvartnots-AAL FC were promoted.
- Aragats FC changed their name to FC Gyumri.

== League table ==
Pos	Team	Pld	W	D	L	GF	GA	GD	Pts	Qualification or relegation
1	Shirak (C)	32	23	4	5	93	29	+64	73	Qualification for the Champions League first qualifying round
2	Ararat Yerevan	32	22	6	4	63	21	+42	72	Qualification for the UEFA Cup qualifying round
3	Tsement Ararat	32	22	5	5	78	19	+59	71	Qualification for the Intertoto Cup First round
4	Zvartnots-AAL	32	16	6	10	50	38	+12	54	
5	Yerevan	32	15	6	11	60	43	+17	51	
6	Erebuni-Homenmen	32	12	5	15	41	44	−3	41	
7	Kilikia (R)	32	10	4	18	57	55	+2	34	Qualification for the Relegation play-off
8	Dvin Artashat (R)	32	2	2	28	20	116	−96	8	Relegation to First League
9	Gyumri (R)	32	2	2	28	23	120	−97	8	Relegation to First League
10	Karabakh Stepanakert (W)	0	0	0	0	0	0	0	0	Expelled (Note: Karabakh Stepanakert were expelled during the season due to financial trouble.)

Source: RSSSF
(C) Champions; (R) Relegated; (W) Withdrew

== Results ==
=== First half of season ===
Home \ Away	ARA	DVI	ERE	GYU	KIL	SHI	TSE	YER	ZVA
Ararat Yerevan		3–0	1–0	3–0	2–1	0–4	1–0	1–0	3–0
Dvin Artashat	0–2		1–3	2–1	1–7	1–3	0–3	0–5	0–3 (Note: Match awarded.)
Erebuni-Homenmen	0–2	2–0		3–0	5–0	0–3	0–3	0–0	0–0
Gyumri	0–7	3–7	0–2		0–2	0–6	1–6	2–1	1–3
Kilikia	0–1	1–1	0–2	9–0		2–3	0–1	2–1	0–0
Shirak	1–2	4–1	1–0	5–0	3–1		0–1	1–0	2–1
Tsement Ararat	2–0	5–1	1–2	3–1	3–1	2–0		1–1	1–0
Yerevan	0–0	2–0	0–0	6–0	4–2	1–1	0–2		1–0
Zvartnots-AAL	1–1	6–1	0–0	1–0	1–0	4–6	1–0	1–2	

Source: RSSSF
Legend: Blue = home team win; Yellow = draw; Red = away team win.

=== Second half of season ===
Home \ Away	ARA	DVI	ERE	GYU	KIL	SHI	TSE	YER	ZVA
Ararat Yerevan		4–1	5–2	5–1	0–0	1–0	1–1	3–0 (Note: Match awarded.)	3–1
Dvin Artashat	0–3		0–3	0–3	0–3	0–4	0–3	1–6	0–1
Erebuni-Homenmen	0–1	3–0		3–0	2–0	1–2	1–7	0–1	0–1
Gyumri	1–2	1–1	0–6		0–2	3–4	0–3	2–2	1–2
Kilikia	1–4	5–0	2–0	5–0		0–3	1–0	2–4	1–2
Shirak	1–1	11–1	6–0	3–0	4–2		1–0	5–0	4–1
Tsement Ararat	0–0	7–0	4–1	8–0	1–1	0–0		2–0	3–2
Yerevan	1–0	3–0	3–0	6–2	5–3	2–1	1–2		2–3
Zvartnots-AAL	2–1	3–0	0–0	2–0	2–1	1–1	1–3	4–0	

Source: RSSSF
Legend: Blue = home team win; Yellow = draw; Red = away team win.

== Promotion/relegation play-off ==
Date	Venue	PL Team	Result	FL Team
12 December	Armavir	Kilikia	0 - 1	Mika-Kasagh Ashtarak

Source: RSSSF

== Top goalscorers ==
#	Player		Team	Goals
1	(Armenia)	Shirak Sarikyan	Tsement Ararat	21
2	(Armenia)	Arman Karamyan	Kilikia	20
3	(Armenia)	Arayik Adamyan	Shirak	16
3	(Armenia)	Mher Avanesyan	Zvartnots-AAL	16
3	(Armenia)	Kolya Yepranosyan	Shirak	16

Source: RSSSF

== See also ==
- 1999 in Armenian football
- 1999 Armenian First League
- 1999 Armenian Cup
