= Jacek Kowalczyk =

Polish footballer

Personal information
- Date of birth: 12 August 1981 (age 45)
- Place of birth: Katowice, Poland
- Height: 1.86 m (6 ft 1 in)
- Position: Defender

Senior career*
Years	Team	Apps	(Gls)
2000–2003	GKS Katowice		
2004–2005	Wisła Kraków	9	(0)
2006	Polonia Warsaw	7	(1)
2006–2010	Odra Wodzisław	94	(2)
2010–2013	GKS Katowice	61	(4)

International career
2003–2004	Poland	3	(0)
- * Club domestic league appearances and goals

Jacek Kowalczyk (born 12 August 1981) is a Polish former professional footballer who played as a defender.

== Club career ==
In his career, he played for clubs such as GKS Katowice, Wisła Kraków and Polonia Warsaw.

In early August 2006, he signed a two-and-a-half-year contract with Odra Wodzisław Śląski, and on 10 December 2008, he signed an extension until June 2011.

== International career ==
He made three appearances for the Poland national team.

== Honours ==
Wisła Kraków

- Ekstraklasa: 2003–04, 2004–05
