= Spitak =

City in Lori, Armenia

Spitak Սպիտակ
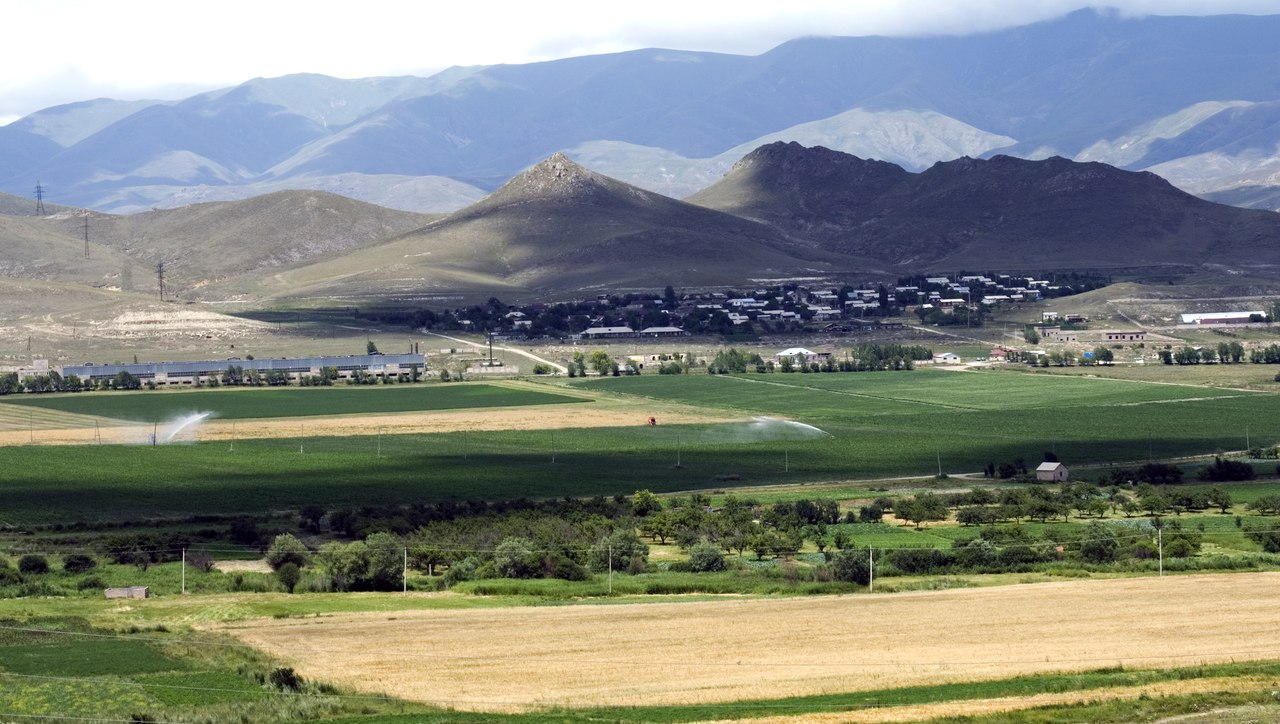
- Spitak

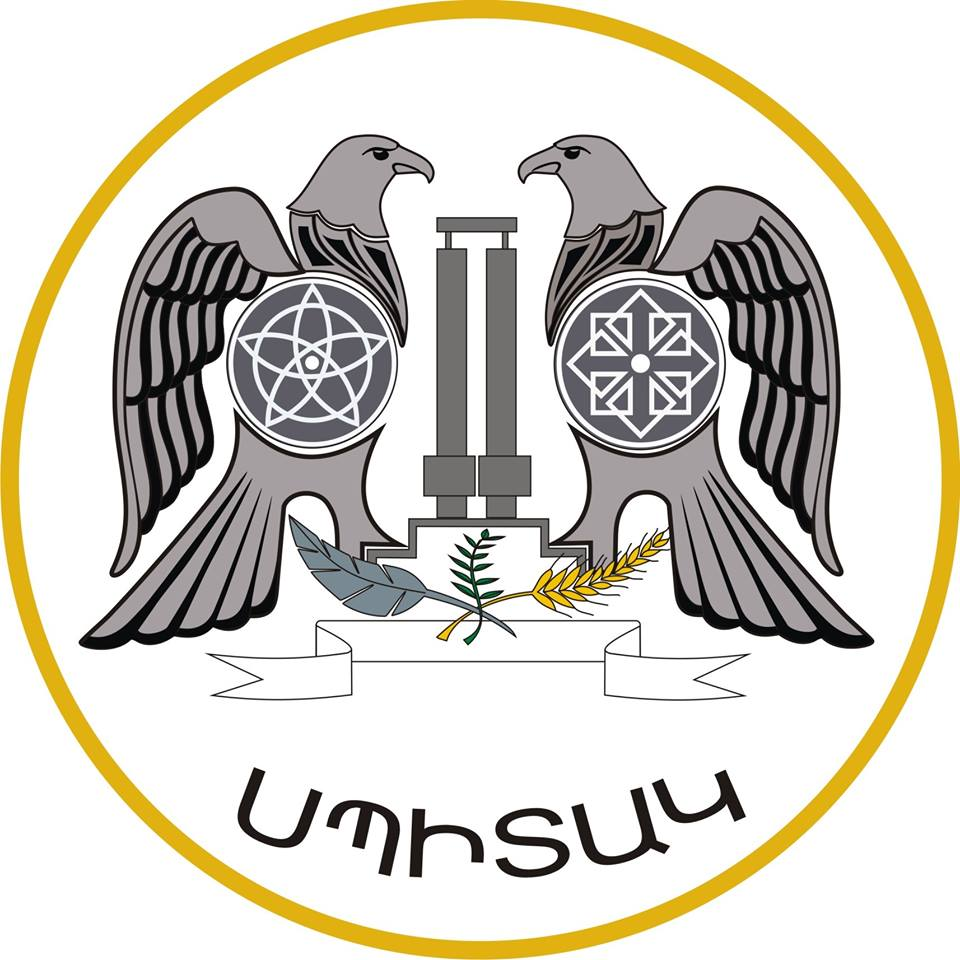
- Seal

- Location within Armenia
- Coordinates: 40°50′14″N 44°16′03″E
- Country: Armenia
- Province: Lori
- Founded: 17th century

Area
  - Total: 57.6 km^{2} (22.2 sq mi)
- Elevation: 1,650 m (5,410 ft)

Population (2022)
  - Total: 13,133
  - Density: 228/km^{2} (591/sq mi)
- Time zone: UTC+4 (AMT)
- Website: Official website

Spitak (Armenian: Սպիտակ), is a city and urban municipal community in the northern Lori Province of Armenia. It is 96 km (60 mi) north of the capital, Yerevan, and 22 km (14 mi) west of the provincial center, Vanadzor. Spitak was entirely destroyed during the devastating 1988 Armenian earthquake, and it was rebuilt in a slightly different location. Currently, the town has an approximate population of 13,133 as per the 2022 census.

== Etymology ==
Spitak, meaning white in Armenian because of the presence of white limestone rocks in the area. The word spitak itself derives from Middle Persian spēdag (compare Parthian ispēd).

== History ==
The area of modern-day Spitak was probably inhabited since the 4th millennium BC, based on ancient settlements found on the surrounding hills. Many remnants are found on the Sardar hill dating back to the Bronze Age. Later, the region was included within the kingdom of Urartu during the 7th century BC. Between the 4th and 2nd centuries BC, the region was part of the Orontid Armenia, followed by the Artaxiad ruled in 189 BC. The region was included within the Tashir (Armenian: Տաշիր) canton of the historic Gugark province, the 13th province of Greater Armenia.

In the 9th century, the territory of Tashir became part of the newly founded Bagratid Kingdom of Armenia in 885. With the establishment of the Kingdom of Tashir-Dzoraget 979 under the protectorate of the Bagratids, the region of Tashir became part of the kingdom ruled by the Kiurikians until its dissolution in 1118.

After a brief Byzantine rule over Armenia between 1045 and 1064, the invading Seljuks ruled over the entire region, including Tashir. However, with the establishment of the Zakarid Principality of Armenia in 1201 under the Georgian protectorate, the Eastern Armenian territories including Gugark had significantly grown. After the Mongols captured Ani in 1236, Tashir became part of the Ilkhanate as a Mongol protectorate, and the Zakarids became vassals to the Mongols. After the fall of the Ilkhanate in the mid-14th century, the Zakarid princes ruled over Tashir until 1360 when they fell to the invading Turkic tribes.

In 1501, most of the Eastern Armenian territories including Tashir were occupied by Safavid Iran. In mid 17th century, the small village Hamamlu was founded in the historic region of Tashir, within the newly formed administrative territory of Erivan Khanate under the Afsharid dynasty of Iran. The first residents of the village were Armenian migrants from the Iranian town of Khoy.

In 1828, the Erivan Khanate -including Hamamlu- was annexed by the Russian Empire. The region became officially part of the Russian Empire at the Treaty of Turkmenchay signed on 10 February 1828 between Imperial Russia and Qajar Persia. Hamamlu became part of the Alexandropol uyezd within the Erivan Governorate of the Russian Empire.

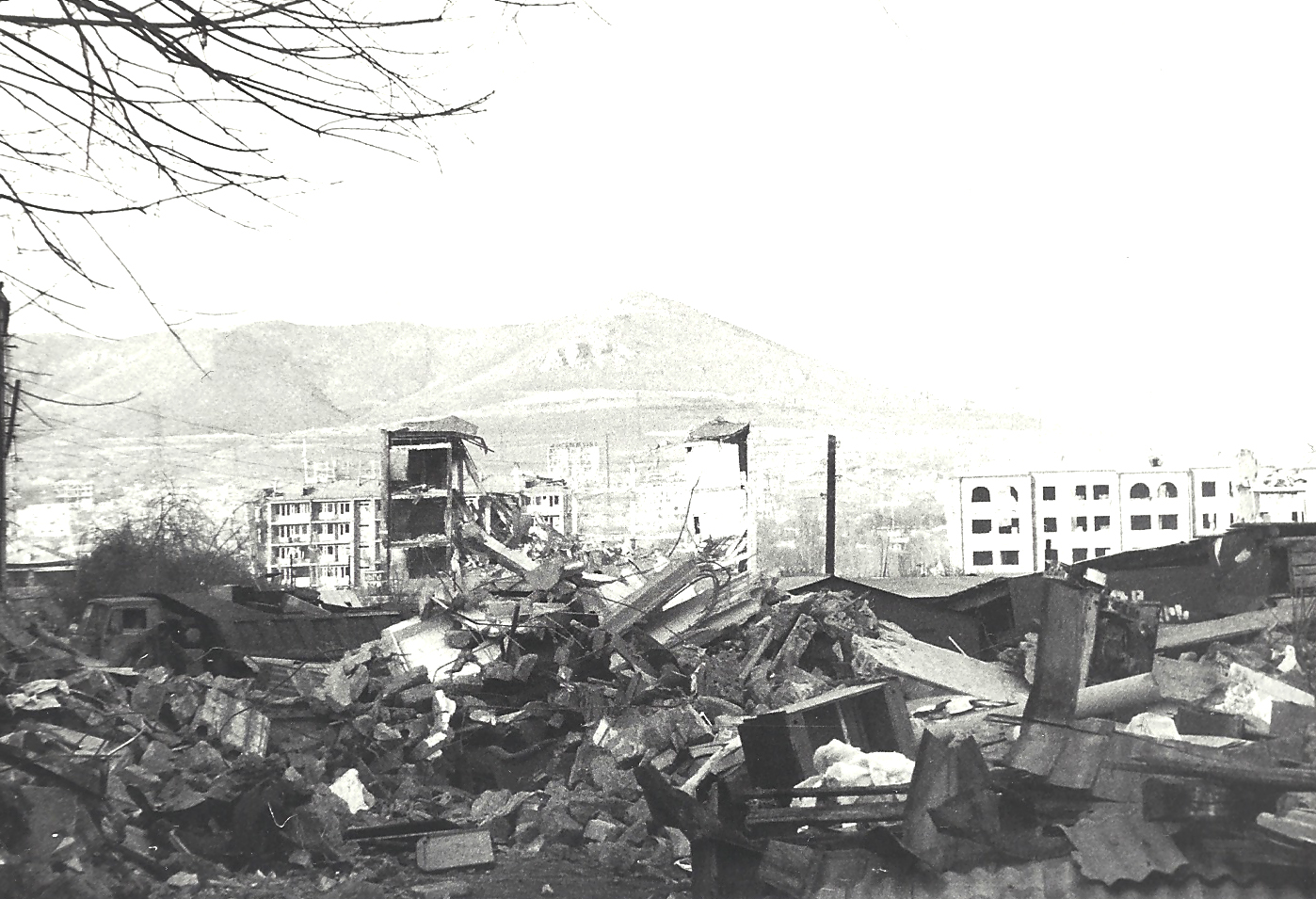
Spitak devastated after the 1988 earthquake

In November 1918, Hamamlu was included within the newly formed Republic of Armenia. Following the Sovietization of Armenia in December 1920, Hamamlu was finally incorporated into Soviet Armenia on 11 February 1921.

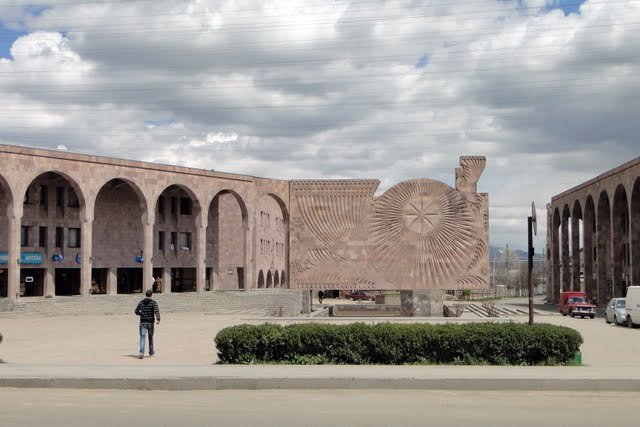
Spitak central square

In 1937 the Hamamlu raion was established, with the village of Hamamlu as the centre of the newly formed administrative region. The dairy products factory of 1937 was the 1st industrial firm opened in Hamamlu under the Soviet rule, followed by the sugar plant in 1947. In 1949, Hamamlu was renamed Spitak along with its raion. In 1960, Spitak received the status of a town. In 1971, it became a town of republican subordination.

The 1st urban development plan of the town was introduced in 1965 by architect A. Harutyanyan, followed by the 2nd plan in 1974 composed by architects K. Ghazaryan and H. Mirzakhanyan. Many large factories were opened in Spitak, mainly for knitwear and dairy products. In 1980, a new urban plan was approved and the sports complex of the town was opened later in 1983.

During the 1988 earthquake, Spitak was entirely destroyed and one third of the town's 15,000 population were killed, while the rest became homeless. The city was gradually rebuilt through the efforts of the Soviet and post-Soviet state governments as well as the Armenian diaspora, with the assistance of many countries.

== Geography ==
Spitak covers an area of 57.6 km^{2} (22 sq mi) on the shores of Pambak River, at a height of 1650 meters above sea level. It is dominated by the Bazum mountains from the north and Pambak mountains from the south.

=== Climate ===
Spitak is characterized with extremely cold winter and mild summer. The annual precipitation level reaches up to 440 mm (17 in).

Climate data for Spitak(WMO ID: 37695, normals for 1936-1992)
Month	Jan	Feb	Mar	Apr	May	Jun	Jul	Aug	Sep	Oct	Nov	Dec	Year
Average precipitation mm (inches)	14.6 (0.57)	17.4 (0.69)	23.2 (0.91)	44.5 (1.75)	73.7 (2.90)	71.3 (2.81)	44.0 (1.73)	36.5 (1.44)	28.0 (1.10)	39.6 (1.56)	25.3 (1.00)	14.5 (0.57)	432.6 (17.03)
Average precipitation days (≥ 0.01 in)	6.2	6.7	8.2	11.1	15.6	13.4	8.4	7.5	6.6	7.9	6.5	5.8	103.9
Source: NCEI

== Demographics ==
Holy Resurrection Church

In the 2011 census, the population of the town was 12,881. Currently, the town has an approximate population of 13,133 as per the 2022 census. Spitak has a population of ethnic Armenians who belong to the Armenian Apostolic Church. The regulating body of the church is the Diocese of Gougark, seated in Vanadzor. The church of Holy Resurrection opened in 2001 is the town's church.

At the beginning of the 19th century, many Armenian migrants from Khoy and Muş who were resettled in the town. In December 1988, around 4,000 people were killed in Spitak as a result of the devastating earthquake. Upon the breakout of the First Nagorno-Karabakh War in 1988, around 500 Armenian refugees from Azerbaijan were resettled in Spitak.

Historical population
Year	Pop.	±% p.a.
1831	466	—
1897	3,004	+2.86%
1908	3,627	+1.73%
1911	3,920	+2.62%
1914	3,986	+0.56%
1926	4,078	+0.19%
1939	5,035	+1.63%
1959	3,740	−1.48%
1979	14,536	+7.02%
1989	3,740	−12.69%
2001	14,984	+12.26%
2011	12,881	−1.50%
2022	13,133	+0.18%

== Culture ==
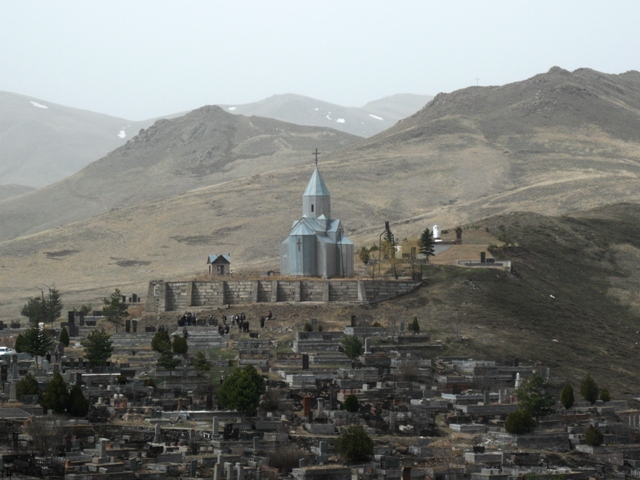
The metallic church in Spitak cemetery

Spitak has a cultural house, 3 public libraries, many cinema theatres, a municipal theater, and an ethnographic museum.

The cultural heritage of the town includes an archaeological site from the 2nd millennium BC, the ruins of an ancient settlement on the nearby Sardar hill from the 1st millennium BC, as well as a bridge on the Pambak river dating back to the 19th century.

The Spitak day is celebrated every year on July the 15th.

== Transportation ==
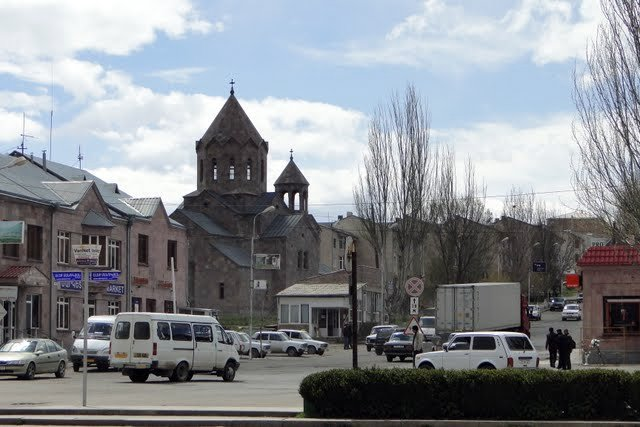
Downtown Spitak

Spitak is an important hub for transportation in Armenia. The M-3 Motorway that connects Yerevan with Tbilisi passes through the town. The M-7 Motorway the connects Gyumri with Vanadzor starts from Spitak.

The town is also home to the Spitak railway station, almost midway between Yerevan and Tbilisi.

== Economy ==
Under the Soviet rule, Spitak became a major industrial hub in northern Armenia. The Spitak dairy factory was opened in 1937, while the sugar factory was opened in 1947. However, after the earthquake, the town lost its significance as an industrial centre in Lori.

The town has a flour mill and a building materials manufacturing plant.

== Education ==
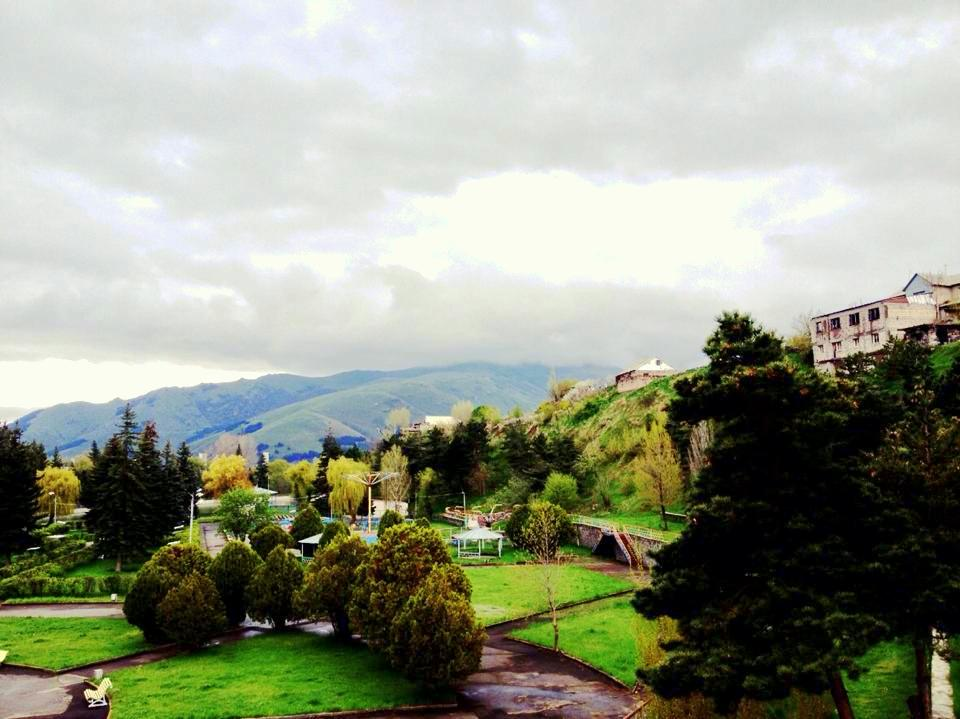
Spitak central park

In 2015, Spitak had 7 public education schools, one boarding school and 7 kindergartens. The town is also home to a musical academy and a school of art.

A branch of the Yerevan electro-technical intermediate college is also operating in the town.

== Sport ==
Football is the most popular sport in the town. FC Spitak represented the town in the domestic competitions between 1990 and 1998. However, like most Armenian football teams, the club was dissolved in 1999 due to financial difficulties.

Spitak has children's and youth's sport school, specialized in six types of sports: football, chess, sambo, judo, wrestling and boxing.

== Twin towns – sister cities ==
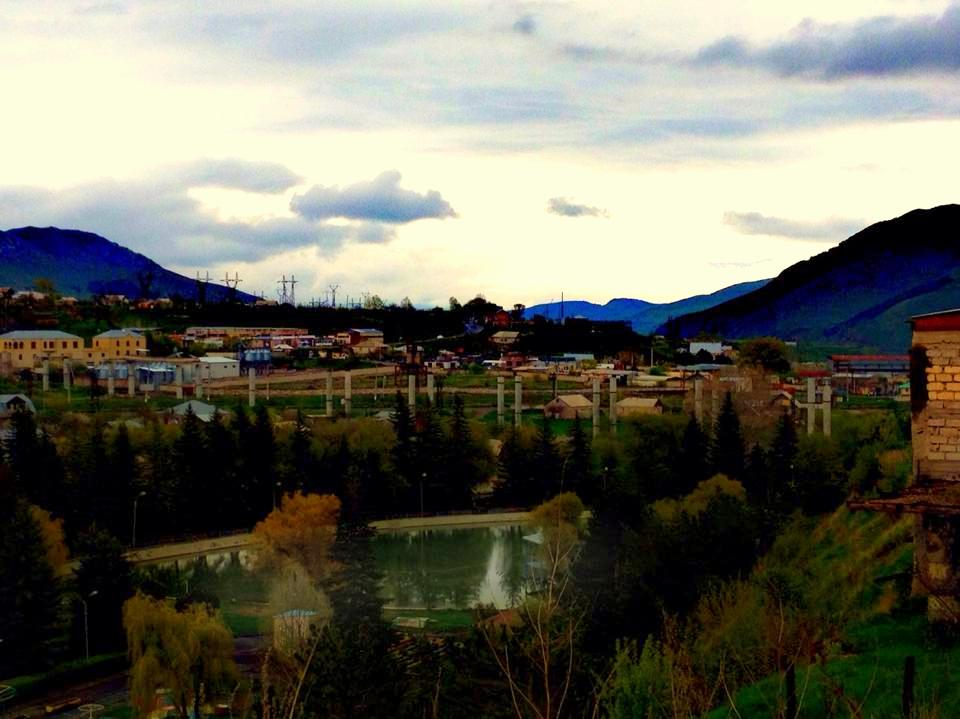
Spitak at dusk

Spitak is twinned with:

- Limmen (Castricum), Netherlands (2011)
- Orsha, Belarus (2009)
- Samara, Russia (2019)

== See also ==
- 1988 Armenian earthquake
