= Spitak Pass =

Mountain pass in Armenia

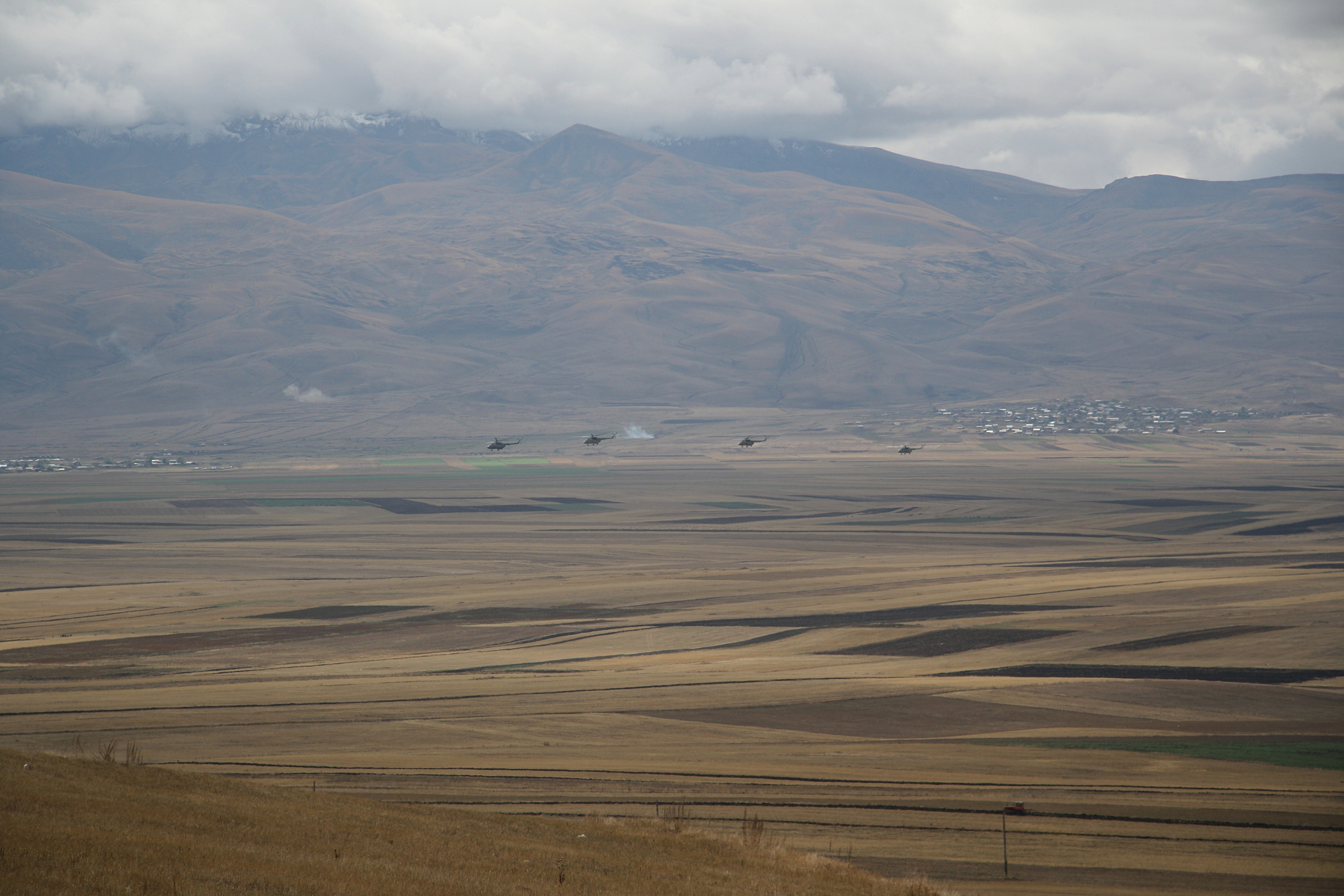
View from the Spitak Pass over an agricultural plain. In the middle-ground is a flight of military helicopters. In the background is the cloud-capped Aragats massif.

Spitak Pass is a pass in Armenia crossing the Pambak mountains from Aragatsotn Province to Lori Province at height 2,378m. The M3 highway (Armenia) (de:M3 (Armenien)) runs via the pass.
