= David Rasmussen (footballer) =

Danish footballer (born 1976)

Personal information
- Date of birth: 1 December 1976 (age 49)
- Place of birth: Copenhagen, Denmark
- Height: 1.82 m (6 ft 0 in)
- Position: Midfielder

Team information
- Current team: Hillerød (assistant)

Youth career
- 1982–1995: B.93

Senior career*
Years	Team	Apps	(Gls)
1995–1997	B.93	1	(?)
1997–1998	Zwolle	8	(0)
1998–2001	B.93	1	(?)
2001–2004	Nordsjælland	91	(17)
2004–2005	Hansa Rostock	16	(1)
2005–2007	Viborg	15	(1)
2007–2008	Fremad Amager	13	(1)
2009–2011	Helsingør		

International career
2003–2004	Denmark	3	(0)

Managerial career
- 2012: Helsingør (assistant)
- 2012–2013: Frederiksværk
- 2014: Karlslunde
- 2015: GVI (assistant)
- 2015–2017: GVI
- 2022: Hillerød (assistant)
- 2024–: Hillerød (assistant)
- * Club domestic league appearances and goals

David Rasmussen (born 1 December 1976 in Copenhagen) is a Danish former professional footballer and current assistant coach of Hillerød Fodbold. He spent one season in the Bundesliga with Hansa Rostock.

== Career ==
=== Coaching career ===
At the beginning of January 2012, Rasmussen confirmed that he would end his career and instead continue as assistant coach for FC Helsingør. Already six months later, in the summer of 2012, Rasmussen becomes head coach of Frederiksværk FK. After just four wins in 17 games in the 2013-14 season, Rasmussen was fired in Frederiksværk at the end of November 2013.

Rasmussen spent the first half of the 2014-15 season as coach of Karlslunde IF, before he was hired as assistant coach for GVI. With three games left in the season and relegation from the Danish 2nd Division already a fact, GVI chose to fire the club's head coach, Søren Fjorting, early, and Rasmussen was hired as head coach just six months after his arrival. Rasmussen left GVI in the summer of 2017.

In the summer of 2022, Rasmussen was back on the coaching bench when he was hired as assistant coach at Hillerød Fodbold, where Christian Lønstrup was head coach, whom Rasmussen knows from their time together at FC Helsingør. However, he had to leave the club again at the end of 2022 as the job did not fit in with his civilian job.

In June 2024, Rasmussen was back in Hillerød when he was hired as assistant coach for the second time, this time as a replacement for Rasmus Minor Petersen, who had left the club.
