= Almir Gegić =

Serbian footballer

Personal information
- Birth name: Almir Gegić
- Date of birth: 30 October 1979 (age 46)
- Place of birth: Novi Pazar, SR Serbia, SFR Yugoslavia
- Height: 1.74 m (5 ft 9 in)
- Position: Midfielder

Senior career*
Years	Team	Apps	(Gls)
1995–1998	Novi Pazar		
1998–2000	Vicenza	6	(0)
2000–2001	Antalyaspor	2	(0)
2001–2002	1. FC Košice	33	(0)
2002–2004	Matador Púchov	57	(1)
2005–2007	Tatran Prešov	62	(10)
2007	İstanbulspor	10	(1)
2007–2011	Chiasso	70	(6)
- * Club domestic league appearances and goals as of 10 May 2014

Almir Gegić (Serbian Cyrillic: Алмир Гегић; born 30 October 1979) is a Serbian-Turkish former footballer. He holds Serbian and Turkish passports.

== Career ==
He debuted for the first team of FK Novi Pazar when he was 17, by the time the team was led by Milonja Kaličanin. In the following season he becomes a regular in the starting line-up. He was spotted by players agent Aleksandar Seničanin in one league game in which he scored a direct goal from a corner. Ever since, his career boosted and he will later play in Italy, Turkey, Slovakia and Switzerland. When he was 18 he went to Italy to trials with Torino F.C., however because of the limit of foreigners he didn't stayed at the team. He further had trials with Brescia Calcio and A.C. Chievo Verona before he signed with Serie A side Vicenza Calcio. He spent all the time on the bench and as Vicenza were struggling to avoid relegation, coach Colombo didn't wanted to take riscs and Gegić ended up not debuting in the Serie A. Vincenza ended up relegated. In the next season Gegić made 6 appearances in the Serie B, but he wanted to play more and decided it was time to move.

He moved to Turkey and joined Antalyaspor. He made his debut in the European cups by playing with Antalyaspor against Werder Bremen in the 2000–01 UEFA Cup. He spends half a season with Antalyaspor and returns to Vicenza. While training with Vicenza, he receives a financially same offer from a Slovak club Matador Púchov which had been acquired b one Italian businessman. He will spend the following 5 seasons in Slovakia.

While playing in Turkey with İstanbulspor in January 2007, he choose his shirt name as Almir Senan. He played two Turkish Super League games for Antalyaspor. In the 2007–08 season, he joined Chiasso and played 22 league matches, he followed the team to play at 1. Liga.

After a year on the run, he surrendered himself to Italian authorities in Milan in 2012 as part of the Calcio scommesse scandal. He confirmed links between the scandal and a Singaporean syndicate, which authorities later tied to Dan Tan.

Besides his playing career, he also opened 2 football schools in Novi Pazar, Legionar and later, Nacional.

== Honours ==
- Slovak Cup: 2003

== Personal life ==
His surname is derived from Albanian ethnic subgroup of Ghegs.
