= Emilio Palucci =

Brazilian footballer and physiotherapist (born 1985)

Personal information
- Full name: Emilio Palucci Calsani
- Date of birth: May 21, 1985 (age 41)
- Place of birth: Ribeirão Preto, Brazil
- Height: 1.83 m (6 ft 0 in)
- Position: Defender

Youth career
- 2002–2005: São Carlos

Senior career*
Years	Team	Apps	(Gls)
2006–2009	Ararat Yerevan	35	(2)
- * Club domestic league appearances and goals as of 13 December 2016

Emilio Palucci (born May 21, 1985, in Ribeirão Preto), is a retired Brazilian football defender. After retiring from football, Emilio became a physiotherapist.
