= Du Bala =

Brazilian footballer (born 1981)

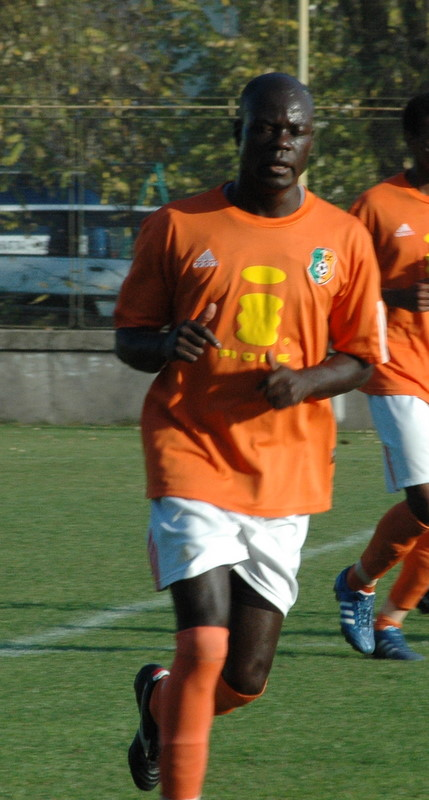

Personal information
- Full name: Eduardo Roberto dos Santos
- Date of birth: 2 February 1981 (age 45)
- Place of birth: Limeira, Brazil
- Height: 1.74 m (5 ft 9 in)
- Position: Striker

Youth career
- Internacional Limeira
- Bangu

Senior career*
Years	Team	Apps	(Gls)
2004	EC Vitória		
2005–2007	Belasitsa Petrich	49	(20)
2008	Litex Lovech	16	(1)
2009	Slavia Sofia	27	(6)
2010–2012	Banants	27	(16)
2013	Gandzasar	7	(0)
- * Club domestic league appearances and goals as of 5 June 2013

Eduardo Roberto dos Santos (born 2 February 1981), commonly known as Du Bala, is a Brazilian retired footballer who played as a forward.

== Career ==
He signed with Belasitsa Petrich on 2 February 2006. For two years in Belasitsa Du Bala earned 34 appearances playing in the A PFG, scoring 15 goals.

In January 2008, Du Bala moved to Litex Lovech, with whom he won the 2008 Bulgarian Cup. One year later Du Bala signed with Slavia Sofia.

== Awards ==
- Bulgarian Cup: 2008
