= Almir Bajramovski =

Macedonian football defender

Personal information
- Full name: Almir Bajramovski
- Date of birth: 21 May 1982 (age 44)
- Place of birth: Bitola, SFR Yugoslavia
- Height: 1.70 m (5 ft 7 in)
- Position: Defender

Youth career
- FK Pelister

Senior career*
Years	Team	Apps	(Gls)
2000–2003	Pelister	130	(8)
2003–2004	Cementarnica	90	(5)
2004–2005	Vardar	45	(4)
2005–2007	Shkëndija	38	(2)
2010–2011	Skopje	55	(3)

International career
2004	Macedonia	2	(0)
- * Club domestic league appearances and goals

Almir Bajramovski (Macedonian: Алмир Бајрамовски; Albanian: Almir Bajrami; born 21 May 1982) is a Macedonian retired football defender, who last played for FK Skopje.

== International career ==
He made his debut for North Macedonia in a January 2004 friendly match against China and has earned a total of 2 caps, scoring no goals. His second international was the second of two friendlies against China in January 2004.

== External sources ==
- Almir Bajramovski at National-Football-Teams.com
