= Eduard Kakosyan =

Armenian footballer

Personal information
- Full name: Eduard Kakosyan
- Date of birth: 4 June 1986 (age 40)
- Place of birth: Soviet Union
- Height: 1.79 m (5 ft 10 in)
- Position: Midfielder

Senior career*
Years	Team	Apps	(Gls)
2004–2010	FC Banants	82	(2)
2010–2012	Impuls FC Dilijan	41	(0)

International career
2004–2005	Armenia U-19	4	(0)
2007–2008	Armenia U-21	1	(0)
2009–	Armenia	3	(0)
- * Club domestic league appearances and goals

Eduard Kakosyan (Armenian: Էդուարդ Կակոսյան; born 4 June 1986), is an Armenian professional football midfielder.

== Club career ==
Eduard grew up being part FC Banants's youth team. He moved up to the main squad mainly during the 2007 and 2008 seasons. In 2007, he had a large contribution in Banants's Armenian Cup glory. Since 2009, he has been a regular for the main team.

=== Club career statistics ===
Season	Club	Competition	Apps	Goals
2004	FC Banants	Armenian Premier League	9	0
2005	FC Banants	Armenian Premier League	5	0
2006	FC Banants	Armenian Premier League	10	1
2007	FC Banants	Armenian Premier League	10	0
2008	FC Banants	Armenian Premier League	17	0
2009	FC Banants	Armenian Premier League	23	1
Total			74	2

== National team ==
Eduard was a member of the Armenia U-21 team, although he only made 1 appearance. He made his debut for the senior squad in a friendly against Moldova on 12 August 2009.

== Achievements ==
- Armenian Cup with FC Banants: 2007
