= Marko Markov =

Bulgarian footballer

Marko Markov Ganchev (Bulgarian: Марко Марков, born 11 August 1981) is a Bulgarian footballer who played as a midfielder.

He has played for a few clubs, including Neftochimic Burgas, Lokomotiv Plovdiv, Vihren Sandanski, Armenian Premier League Banants Yerevan and Sliven 2000.

- Height - 1.71 m.
- Weight - 65 kg.
- Number - 8

== Career ==
- 1999-2000 (Bulgaria) Naftex Burgas
- 2000-2002 (Bulgaria) FC Pomorie
- 2002-2003 (Bulgaria) Naftex Burgas
- 2003-2004 (Bulgaria) PFC Sliven
- 2004-2005 (Bulgaria) Lokomotiv Plovdiv
- 2005-2007 (Bulgaria) FC Vihren Sandanski
- 2007 (Greece) Aiolikos
- 2008 (Armenia) Banants Yerevan
