= Arshak Amiryan =

Armenian footballer

Personal information
- Full name: Arshak Amiryan
- Date of birth: 11 September 1977 (age 49)
- Place of birth: Yerevan, Armenia
- Height: 1.68 m (5 ft 6 in)
- Position: Midfielder

Senior career*
Years	Team	Apps	(Gls)
1995–1997	Yerevan		
1997–2011	Ararat Yerevan		
2001–2002	Bargh Shiraz	26	(1)
2002–2003	Ararat Tehran		
2003	Spartak Yerevan		
2003–2005	Banants	3	(2)
2008	Gandzasar Kapan	9	(0)
2008	Ulisses	12	(0)

International career
1998	Armenia	1	(0)
- * Club domestic league appearances and goals as of 10 october 2016

Arshak Amiryan (Armenian: Արշակ Ամիրյան; born 11 September 1977) is an Armenian professional footballer.
