= FC Spitak =

Armenian defunct association football team

- Full name: Spitak Football Club
- Founded: 1990
- Dissolved: 1999
- League: Armenian First League
- 1998: 10th Place

Spitak Football Club (Armenian: Ֆուտբոլային Ակումբ Սպիտակ) was an Armenian football club from the town of Spitak, Lori Province. The club was dissolved in 1999.

== League record ==
Year	Club name	Division	Position	GP	W	D	L	GS	GA	PTS
1990	Spitak F.C.	Armenian SSR League	3	32	23	3	6	106	41	49
1991	Spitak F.C.	Armenian SSR League	4	38	25	3	10	112	61	53
1992 – 1996–97	-	no participation	-	-	-	-	-	-	-	-
1997	Spitak F.C.	Armenian First League	2	16	13	1	2	38	14	40
1998	Spitak F.C.	Armenian First League	10	24	9	1	14	35	50	28
1999–present	-	no participation	-	-	-	-	-	-	-	-
