= SKVV Yerevan =

- Full name: SKVV Yerevan
- Founded: 1998; 27 years ago
- Dissolved: 1999; 26 years ago

SKVV Yerevan (Armenian: ՍԿՎՎ Երևան) was a short-lived Armenian football club from the capital Yerevan. The club was formed in 1998, representing the Committee of the Soviet Veterans of World War II (Sovetskiy komitet veteranov voyny / Советский комитет ветеранов войны (СКВВ)).

On their debut, the club participated in the Armenian First League. After spending one year in the First League, the SKVV was dissolved prior to the 1999 season kick-off due to a lack of financial resources.

== League record ==
| Year | Club name | Division | Position | GP | W | D | L | GS | GA | PTS |
|---|---|---|---|---|---|---|---|---|---|---|
| 1998 | SKVV Yerevan | Armenian First League | 7 | 24 | 10 | 3 | 11 | 49 | 39 | 33 |
| 1999 | SKVV Yerevan | Armenian First League | - | - | - | - | - | - | - | - |
