= Mher Avanesyan =

Armenian footballer

Personal information
- Date of birth: 28 July 1974 (age 52)
- Height: 1.81 m (5 ft 11 in)
- Position: Forward

Senior career*
Years	Team	Apps	(Gls)
1995–1998	Lernayin Artsakh		
1998–1999	Shirak		
1999–2000	Zvartnots-AAL		
2000–2001	Shirak		
2001–2002	Bargh Shiraz	26	(2)
2002–2003	Zvartnots-AAL		
2004–2005	Ararat Yerevan		
2006	Lernayin Artsakh		
- * Club domestic league appearances and goals as of 17 October 2016

Mher Avanesyan; born 28 July 1974) is an Armenian professional footballer.
