= Blackburn Rovers F.C. in European football =

English club in European football

- Club: Blackburn Rovers
- Seasons played: 8
- Most appearances: Brad Friedel (18)
- Top scorer: Benni McCarthy (5)
- First entry: 1994–95 UEFA Cup
- Latest entry: 2007–08 UEFA Cup

Blackburn Rovers is an English professional football club based in Blackburn, Lancashire. The club has competed eight times in UEFA competitions in its history, with its first entry coming in the 1994–95 UEFA Cup. Additionally, the club has also participated in the minor Anglo-Scottish Cup on a number of occasions.

== History ==
=== 1994–95 UEFA Cup ===
Blackburn's first foray into European competition came following the club's second-place finish in the 1993–94 FA Premier League. Drawn against Swedish side Trelleborg in the first round, Blackburn were unable to negotiate the two-legged tie and were eliminated.

Season	Competition	Round	Opposition	Home	Attendance	Away	Attendance	Aggregate
1994–95	UEFA Cup	First round	(Sweden) Trelleborg	0–1	13,775	2–2	6,730	2–3

=== 1995–96 UEFA Champions League ===
In 1995, Blackburn won the league championship, and thus qualified for Europe's premier competition, the UEFA Champions League for the first time in their history. Drawn in a group alongside teams from Russia, Poland and Norway, Blackburn went into the competition with a degree of confidence that they would be able to negotiate what was felt to be a less difficult group than it might have been. However, the club ultimately came bottom of their group with a single win from their six games.

Season	Competition	Round	Opposition	Home	Attendance	Away	Attendance	Aggregate
1995–96	UEFA Champions League	Group B	(Russia) Spartak Moscow	0–1	20,940	0–3	25,000	4th
1995–96	UEFA Champions League	Group B	(Norway) Rosenborg	4–1	20,677	1–2	12,210	4th
1995–96	UEFA Champions League	Group B	(Poland) Legia Warsaw	0–0	20,897	0–1	15,000	4th

=== 1998–99 UEFA Cup ===
Having missed out on European competition for three seasons, Blackburn qualified for the 1998–99 UEFA Cup thanks to their sixth place finish in the Premier League. Drawn in the first round against French club Lyon, Blackburn again failed to negotiate their way through, losing 3–2 on aggregate.

Season	Competition	Round	Opposition	Home	Attendance	Away	Attendance	Aggregate
1998–99	UEFA Cup	First round	(France) Lyon	0–1	13,646	2–2	24,558	2–3

=== 2002–03 UEFA Cup ===
Having won the 2001–02 Football League Cup, their first trophy since the 1994–95 Premier League title, Blackburn gained qualification for the 2002–03 UEFA Cup, the club's third attempt at the competition. This saw them get through the opening round of European competition for the first time thanks to an away goals victory over Bulgarian side CSKA Sofia, which led to them meeting Celtic in the second round. Ultimately, Blackburn were unable to negotiate the so-called "Battle of Britain" tie, and were eliminated by the Scottish side.

Season	Competition	Round	Opposition	Home	Attendance	Away	Attendance	Aggregate
2002–03	UEFA Cup	First round	(Bulgaria) CSKA Sofia	1–1	18,300	3–3	18,000	4–4 (a)
2002–03	UEFA Cup	Second round	(Scotland) Celtic	0–2	29,698	0–1	55,553	0–3

=== 2003–04 UEFA Cup ===
Blackburn's sixth place finish in the 2002–03 FA Premier League saw them once again enter the UEFA Cup the following season, which saw them drawn against Gençlerbirliği from Turkey. Once again Blackburn were unable to get past the first round of the competition, this time losing 4–2 on aggregate over the two legs.

Season	Competition	Round	Opposition	Home	Attendance	Away	Attendance	Aggregate
2003–04	UEFA Cup	First round	(Turkey) Gençlerbirliği	1–1	14,573	1–3	14,102	2–4

=== 2006–07 UEFA Cup ===
Another sixth place finish in the league saw Blackburn qualify for the 2006–07 UEFA Cup. Having beaten Red Bull Salzburg in the opening round, the club qualified for the group stage. Three wins in the group stage led to Blackburn finish top and reach the latter stages of a UEFA competition for the first time. In the following Round of 32, the club faced off against Bayer Leverkusen, who knocked them out 3–2 on aggregate.

Season	Competition	Round	Opposition	Home	Attendance	Away	Attendance	Aggregate
2006–07	UEFA Cup	First round	(Austria) Red Bull Salzburg	2–0	18,888	2–2	16,140	4–2
2006–07	UEFA Cup	Group E	(Poland) Wisła Kraków	—N/a	—N/a	2–1	10,500	1st
2006–07	UEFA Cup	Group E	(Switzerland) Basel	3–0	13,789	—N/a	—N/a	1st
2006–07	UEFA Cup	Group E	(Netherlands) Feyenoord	—N/a	—N/a	0–0	28,000	1st
2006–07	UEFA Cup	Group E	(France) Nancy	1–0	12,568	—N/a	—N/a	1st
2006–07	UEFA Cup	Round of 32	(Germany) Bayer Leverkusen	0–0	25,124	2–3	17,906	2–3

=== 2007 UEFA Intertoto Cup ===
Although only finishing tenth in the 2006–07 FA Premier League, Blackburn were the highest ranked club in the table that applied for entry into the UEFA Intertoto Cup that had not otherwise qualified for European football. As a result, the club entered UEFA's summer competition for the first time. The format of the competition meant that, entering in the third round, victory in a single two-legged tie would provide a place in the 2007–08 UEFA Cup. Drawn against FK Vėtra of Lithuania, Blackburn secured a 6–0 aggregate victory, the club's largest such win in European competition.

Season	Competition	Round	Opposition	Home	Attendance	Away	Attendance	Aggregate
2007	UEFA Intertoto Cup	Third round	(Lithuania) FK Vėtra	4–0	11,854	2–0	4,200	6–0

=== 2007–08 UEFA Cup ===
Having negotiated the 2007 UEFA Intertoto Cup, Blackburn gained a place in the 2007–08 UEFA Cup. Entering in the second qualifying round, the club negotiated its way past Finnish side MyPa 47 before being eliminated in the first round proper by Larissa of Greece.

Season	Competition	Round	Opposition	Home	Attendance	Away	Attendance	Aggregate
2007–08	UEFA Cup	Second qualifying round	(Finland) MyPa 47	2–0	13,490	1–0	3,340	3–0
2007–08	UEFA Cup	First round	(Greece) AEL	2–1	20,741	0–2	8,126	2–3

== Overall record in UEFA competitions ==
=== Record by competition ===
Competition	Pld	W	D	L	GF	GA	GD	Best performance
UEFA Champions League	6	1	1	4	5	8	-3	Group stage (1995–96)
UEFA Cup	22	7	8	7	27	27	0	Round of 32 (2006–07)
UEFA Intertoto Cup	2	2	0	0	8	0	+8	Third round (2007) (Note: Blackburn were one of eleven "co-winners" of the Intertoto Cup, receiving a place in the UEFA Cup)
Total	30	10	9	11	40	35	+5	

=== Record by nation ===
Nation	Pld	W	D	L	GF	GA	GD	Opponents
Austria	2	1	1	0	4	2	+2	Red Bull Salzburg
Bulgaria	2	0	2	0	4	4	0	CSKA Sofia
Finland	2	2	0	0	3	0	+3	MyPa-47
France	3	1	1	1	3	3	0	Lyon, Nancy
Germany	2	0	1	1	2	3	-1	Bayer Leverkusen
Greece	2	1	0	1	2	3	-1	AEL
Lithuania	2	2	0	0	6	0	+6	FK Vėtra
Netherlands	1	0	1	0	0	0	0	Feyenoord
Norway	2	1	0	1	5	3	+2	Rosenborg
Poland	3	1	1	1	2	2	0	Legia Warsaw, Wisła Kraków
Russia	2	0	0	2	0	4	-4	Spartak Moscow
Scotland	2	0	0	2	0	3	-3	Celtic
Switzerland	1	1	0	0	3	0	+3	Basel
Sweden	2	0	1	1	2	3	-1	Trelleborg
Turkey	2	0	1	1	2	4	-2	Gençlerbirliği

=== Record by match ===
Season	Competition	Round	Opposition	Home	Away	Aggregate
1994–95	UEFA Cup	First round	(Sweden) Trelleborg	0–1	2–2	2–3
1995–96	UEFA Champions League	Group B	(Russia) Spartak Moscow	0–1	0–3	4th
1995–96	UEFA Champions League	Group B	(Norway) Rosenborg	4–1	1–2	4th
1995–96	UEFA Champions League	Group B	(Poland) Legia Warsaw	0–0	0–1	4th
1998–99	UEFA Cup	First round	(France) Lyon	0–1	2–2	2–3
1998–99	UEFA Cup	First round	(Bulgaria) CSKA Sofia	1–1	3–3	4–4 (a)
1998–99	UEFA Cup	Second round	(Scotland) Celtic	0–2	0–1	0–3
2003–04	UEFA Cup	First round	(Turkey) Gençlerbirliği	1–1	1–3	2–4
2006–07	UEFA Cup	First round	(Austria) Red Bull Salzburg	2–0	2–2	4–2
2006–07	UEFA Cup	Group E	(Poland) Wisła Kraków	—N/a	2–1	1st
2006–07	UEFA Cup	Group E	(Switzerland) Basel	3–0	—N/a	1st
2006–07	UEFA Cup	Group E	(Netherlands) Feyenoord	—N/a	0–0	1st
2006–07	UEFA Cup	Group E	(France) Nancy	1–0	—N/a	1st
2006–07	UEFA Cup	Round of 32	(Germany) Bayer Leverkusen	0–0	2–3	2–3
2007	UEFA Intertoto Cup	Third round	(Lithuania) FK Vėtra	4–0	2–0	6–0
2007–08	UEFA Cup	Second qualifying round	(Finland) MyPa 47	2–0	1–0	3–0
2007–08	UEFA Cup	First round	(Greece) AEL	2–1	0–2	2–3

== All-time goalscorers in UEFA competitions ==
The following is a list of Blackburn's goalscorers in official UEFA competitions:

Rank	Player	Champions League	UEFA Cup	Intertoto Cup	Total
1	(South Africa) Benni McCarthy	0	3	2	5
=2	(England) David Bentley	0	4	0	4
=2	(England) Mike Newell	4	0	0	4
=4	(England) Matt Derbyshire	0	1	1	2
=4	(England) Jason Roberts	0	1	1	2
=4	(Wales) Robbie Savage	0	2	0	2
=4	(England) Alan Shearer	1	1	0	2
=8	(Republic of Ireland) Damien Duff	0	1	0	1
=8	(Australia) Brett Emerton	0	1	0	1
=8	(England) Garry Flitcroft	0	1	0	1
=8	(Italy) Corrado Grabbi	0	1	0	1
=8	(England) Matt Jansen	0	1	0	1
=8	(England) Francis Jeffers	0	1	0	1
=8	(Australia) Lucas Neill	0	1	0	1
=8	(Democratic Republic of the Congo) Shabani Nonda	0	1	0	1
=8	(Norway) Egil Østenstad	0	1	0	1
=8	(Norway) Morten Gamst Pedersen	0	0	1	1
=8	(France) Sébastien Pérez	0	1	0	1
=8	(Republic of the Congo) Christopher Samba	0	0	1	1
=8	(Paraguay) Roque Santa Cruz	0	1	0	1
=8	(England) Chris Sutton	0	1	0	1
=8	(England) David Thompson	0	1	0	1
=8	(Turkey) Tugay Kerimoğlu	0	1	0	1
=8	(England) Stephen Warnock	0	1	0	1

== Non-UEFA competitions ==
=== Anglo-Scottish Cup ===
Blackburn Rovers participated in every instance of the Anglo-Scottish Cup, a competition inaugurated in 1975 as a reincarnation of the Texaco Cup.

==== 1975–76 Anglo-Scottish Cup ====
Season	Round	Opposition	Home	Away	Aggregate
1975–76	Group C	(England) Sheffield United	—N/a	1–3	1st
1975–76	Group C	(England) Manchester City	1–0	—N/a	1st
1975–76	Group C	(England) Blackpool	3–2	—N/a	1st
1975–76	Quarter-final	(Scotland) Motherwell	0–0	1–2	1–2

==== 1976–77 Anglo-Scottish Cup ====
Season	Round	Opposition	Home	Away	Aggregate
1976–77	Group A	(England) Burnley	1–1	—N/a	4th
1976–77	Group A	(England) Blackpool	1–0	—N/a	4th
1976–77	Group A	(England) Bolton Wanderers	—N/a	0–2	4th

==== 1977–78 Anglo-Scottish Cup ====
Season	Round	Opposition	Home	Away	Aggregate
1977–78	Group A	(England) Burnley	—N/a	1–2	1st
1977–78	Group A	(England) Blackpool	3–1	—N/a	1st
1977–78	Group A	(England) Bolton Wanderers	2–0	—N/a	1st
1977–78	Quarter-final	(Scotland) Hibernian	0–1	1–2	1–3

==== 1978–79 Anglo-Scottish Cup ====
Season	Round	Opposition	Home	Away	Aggregate
1978–79	Group A	(England) Blackpool	—N/a	1–0	2nd
1978–79	Group A	(England) Preston North End	1–0	—N/a	2nd
1978–79	Group A	(England) Burnley	1–1	—N/a	2nd

==== 1979–80 Anglo-Scottish Cup ====
Season	Round	Opposition	Home	Away	Aggregate
1979–80	Group A	(England) Blackpool	—N/a	2–2	2nd
1979–80	Group A	(England) Burnley	2–2	—N/a	2nd
1979–80	Group A	(England) Preston North End	1–1	—N/a	2nd

==== 1980–81 Anglo-Scottish Cup ====
Season	Round	Opposition	Home	Away	Aggregate
1980–81	Group D	(England) Blackpool	—N/a	0–2	2nd
1980–81	Group D	(England) Preston North End	—N/a	1–0	2nd
1980–81	Group D	(England) Carlisle United	—N/a	4–1	2nd
