= 2003–04 UEFA Cup final phase =

The final phase of the 2003–04 UEFA Cup began on 26 February 2004 with the third round and concluded on 19 May 2004 with the final at the Ullevi in Gothenburg, Sweden. The final phase involved 32 teams: the 24 teams which qualified from the second round, and the eight third-placed teams from the Champions League group stage.

Times up to 27 March 2004 (third and fourth rounds) were CET (UTC+1), and thereafter (quarter-finals to final) CEST (UTC+2).

== Round and draw dates ==
The schedule was as follows (all draws were held at the UEFA headquarters in Nyon, Switzerland).

Round	Draw date	First leg	Second leg
Third round	12 December 2003	26 February 2004	3 March 2004
Fourth round	4 March 2004	11 March 2004	25 March 2004
Quarter-finals	4 March 2004	8 April 2004	14 April 2004
Semi-finals	4 March 2004	22 April 2004	6 May 2004
Final	4 March 2004	19 May 2004 at Ullevi, Gothenburg	

== Format ==
Apart from the final, each tie was played over two legs, with each team playing one leg at home. The team that scored more goals on aggregate over the two legs advanced to the next round. If the aggregate score was level, the away goals rule was applied, i.e., the team that scored more goals away from home over the two legs advanced. If away goals were also equal, then thirty minutes of extra time (two fifteen-minute periods) was played. In the final phase the silver goal system was applied, whereby the team who leads the game at the half-time break during the extra time period would be declared the winner. If the scores were still level after the initial 15 minutes of extra time play would continue for a further 15 minutes. The away goals rule was again applied after extra time, i.e., if there were goals scored during extra time and the aggregate score was still level, the visiting team advanced by virtue of more away goals scored. If no goals were scored during extra time, the tie was decided by penalty shoot-out.

In the final, which was played as a single match, if scores were level at the end of normal time, extra time was played. If, on completion of the first period of extra time, one of the teams had scored more goals than the other, the silver goal rule was applied, i.e., the match ended and that team was declared the winner. If no decisive goal was scored, the second period of the extra time was played, followed by a penalty shoot-out if scores remained tied. The mechanism of the draws for each round was as follows:

- In the draws for the third and fourth rounds, teams were seeded and divided into groups containing an equal number of seeded and unseeded teams. In each group, the seeded teams were drawn against the unseeded teams, with the first team drawn hosting the first leg. Teams from the same association could not be drawn against each other.
- In the draws for the quarter-finals onwards, there were no seedings and teams from the same association could be drawn against each other.

== Bracket ==
Third round
(Scotland) Celtic	3	0	3
(Czech Republic) Teplice	0	1	1
(Denmark) Brøndby	0	1	1
(Spain) Barcelona	1	2	3
(Turkey) Galatasaray	2	0	2
(Spain) Villarreal	2	3	5
(Turkey) Gaziantepspor	1	0	1
(Italy) Roma	0	2	2
(Poland) Groclin Grodzisk Wielkopolski	0	1	1
(France) Bordeaux	1	4	5
(Belgium) Club Brugge	1	0	1
(Hungary) Debrecen	0	0	0
(Italy) Parma	0	0	0
(Turkey) Gençlerbirliği	1	3	4
(Spain) Valencia	3	2	5
(Turkey) Beşiktaş	2	0	2
(France) Auxerre	0	1	1
(Greece) Panathinaikos	0	0	0
(Italy) Perugia	0	1	1
(Netherlands) PSV Eindhoven	0	3	3
(Norway) Vålerenga	1	1	2
(England) Newcastle United	1	3	4
(Russia) Spartak Moscow	0	1	1
(Spain) Mallorca	3	0	3
(England) Liverpool	2	4	6
(Bulgaria) Levski Sofia	0	2	2
(France) Marseille	1	0	1
(Ukraine) Dnipro Dnipropetrovsk	0	0	0
(Portugal) Benfica (a)	1	1	2
(Norway) Rosenborg	0	2	2
(France) Sochaux	2	0	2
(Italy) Internazionale (a)	2	0	2

Fourth round
(Scotland) Celtic	1	0	1
(Spain) Barcelona	0	0	0
(Spain) Villarreal	2	1	3
(Italy) Roma	0	2	2
(France) Bordeaux	3	1	4
(Belgium) Club Brugge	1	0	1
(Turkey) Gençlerbirliği	1	0	1
(Spain) Valencia (s.g.)	0	2	2
(France) Auxerre	1	0	1
(Netherlands) PSV Eindhoven	1	3	4
(England) Newcastle United	4	3	7
(Spain) Mallorca	1	0	1
(England) Liverpool	1	1	2
(France) Marseille	1	2	3
(Portugal) Benfica	0	3	3
(Italy) Internazionale	0	4	4

Quarter-finals
(Scotland) Celtic	1	0	1
(Spain) Villarreal	1	2	3
(France) Bordeaux	1	1	2
(Spain) Valencia	2	2	4
(Netherlands) PSV Eindhoven	1	1	2
(England) Newcastle United	1	2	3
(France) Marseille	1	1	2
(Italy) Internazionale	0	0	0

Semi-finals
(Spain) Villarreal	0	0	0
(Spain) Valencia	0	1	1
(England) Newcastle United	0	0	0
(France) Marseille	0	2	2

Final
19 May – Gothenburg
(Spain) Valencia	2
(France) Marseille	0

== Third round ==
The draw for the third round was held on 12 December 2003, 13:00 CET.

=== Summary ===
The first legs were played on 26 February, and the second legs were played on 3 March 2004.

Team 1	Agg.	Team 2	1st leg	2nd leg
Brøndby (Denmark)	1–3	(Spain) Barcelona	0–1	1–2
Parma (Italy)	0–4	(Turkey) Gençlerbirliği	0–1	0–3
Benfica (Portugal)	2–2 (a)	(Norway) Rosenborg	1–0	1–2
Marseille (France)	1–0	(Ukraine) Dnipro Dnipropetrovsk	1–0	0–0
Celtic (Scotland)	3–1	(Czech Republic) Teplice	3–0	0–1
Perugia (Italy)	1–3	(Netherlands) PSV Eindhoven	0–0	1–3
Groclin Grodzisk Wielkopolski (Poland)	1–5	(France) Bordeaux	0–1	1–4
Valencia (Spain)	5–2	(Turkey) Beşiktaş	3–2	2–0
Galatasaray (Turkey)	2–5	(Spain) Villarreal	2–2	0–3
Club Brugge (Belgium)	1–0	(Hungary) Debrecen	1–0	0–0
Sochaux (France)	2–2 (a)	(Italy) Internazionale	2–2	0–0
Liverpool (England)	6–2	(Bulgaria) Levski Sofia	2–0	4–2
Spartak Moscow (Russia)	1–3	(Spain) Mallorca	0–3	1–0
Gaziantepspor (Turkey)	1–2	(Italy) Roma	1–0	0–2
Auxerre (France)	1–0	(Greece) Panathinaikos	0–0	1–0
Vålerenga (Norway)	2–4	(England) Newcastle United	1–1	1–3

=== Matches ===
26 February 2004
20:30

Brøndby (Denmark)	0–1	(Spain) Barcelona
	Report	Ronaldinho 63'

Brøndby Stadium, Brøndbyvester
Attendance: 26,031
Referee: Frank De Bleeckere (Belgium)
3 March 2004
21:15

Barcelona (Spain)	2–1	(Denmark) Brøndby
Luis García 31'; Cocu 43'	Report	Nielsen 84'

Camp Nou, Barcelona
Attendance: 46,589
Referee: Massimo Busacca (Switzerland)

Barcelona won 3–1 on aggregate.

26 February 2004
19:45

Parma (Italy)	0–1	(Turkey) Gençlerbirliği
	Report	Skoko 60'

Stadio Ennio Tardini, Parma
Attendance: 404
Referee: Wolfgang Stark (Germany)
3 March 2004
16:45

Gençlerbirliği (Turkey)	3–0	(Italy) Parma
Daems 37' (pen.); Ferrari 81' (o.g.); Tandoğan 90+5'	Report

19 Mayıs Stadium, Ankara
Attendance: 15,723
Referee: Éric Poulat (France)

Gençlerbirliği won 4–0 on aggregate.

26 February 2004
22:15

Benfica (Portugal)	1–0	(Norway) Rosenborg
Zahovič 59'	Report

Estádio da Luz, Lisbon
Attendance: 47,111
Referee: Paul Allaerts (Belgium)
3 March 2004
20:45

Rosenborg (Norway)	2–1	(Portugal) Benfica
Berg 7'; Karadas 15'	Report	Nuno Gomes 19'

Lerkendal Stadium, Trondheim
Attendance: 18,238
Referee: Vladimír Hriňák (Slovakia)

2–2 on aggregate; Benfica won on away goals.

26 February 2004
19:00

Marseille (France)	1–0	(Ukraine) Dnipro Dnipropetrovsk
Drogba 54' (pen.)	Report

Stade Vélodrome, Marseille
Attendance: 15,285
Referee: Georgios Kasnaferis (Greece)
3 March 2004
17:00

Dnipro Dnipropetrovsk (Ukraine)	0–0	(France) Marseille
	Report

Meteor Stadium, Dnipropetrovsk
Attendance: 22,100
Referee: Claus Bo Larsen (Denmark)

Marseille won 1–0 on aggregate.

26 February 2004
20:45

Celtic (Scotland)	3–0	(Czech Republic) Teplice
Larsson 3', 90'; Sutton 12'	Report

Celtic Park, Glasgow
Attendance: 48,947
Referee: Konrad Plautz (Austria)
3 March 2004
18:00

Teplice (Czech Republic)	1–0	(Scotland) Celtic
Mašek 35'	Report

Na Stínadlech, Teplice
Attendance: 16,258
Referee: Tom Henning Øvrebø (Norway)

Celtic won 3–1 on aggregate.

26 February 2004
19:30

Perugia (Italy)	0–0	(Netherlands) PSV Eindhoven
	Report

Stadio Renato Curi, Perugia
Attendance: 2,451
Referee: Michal Beneš (Czech Republic)
3 March 2004
20:30

PSV Eindhoven (Netherlands)	3–1	(Italy) Perugia
Hofland 22'; Kežman 43', 48'	Report	Zé Maria 88'

Philips Stadion, Eindhoven
Attendance: 26,000
Referee: Eduardo Iturralde González (Spain)

PSV Eindhoven won 3–1 on aggregate.

26 February 2004
18:00

Groclin Grodzisk Wielkopolski (Poland)	0–1	(France) Bordeaux
	Report	Chamakh 90'

Stadion Dyskobolia, Grodzisk Wielkopolski
Attendance: 4,000
Referee: Stefan Messner (Austria)
3 March 2004
18:45

Bordeaux (France)	4–1	(Poland) Groclin Grodzisk Wielkopolski
Planus 41'; Chamakh 42'; Križanac 64' (o.g.); Riera 74' (pen.)	Report	Wieszczycki 90'

Stade Chaban-Delmas, Bordeaux
Attendance: 9,197
Referee: Paulo Costa (Portugal)

Bordeaux won 6–2 on aggregate.

26 February 2004
21:30

Valencia (Spain)	3–2	(Turkey) Beşiktaş
Sissoko 25'; Canobbio 43'; Navarro 90+4'	Report	Pancu 17', 39'

Mestalla Stadium, Valencia
Attendance: 21,000
Referee: Alain Sars (France)
3 March 2004
19:30

Beşiktaş (Turkey)	0–2	(Spain) Valencia
	Report	Angulo 12'; Juan Sánchez 57'

BJK İnönü Stadium, Istanbul
Attendance: 18,600
Referee: Domenico Messina (Italy)

Valencia won 5–2 on aggregate.

26 February 2004
19:30

Galatasaray (Turkey)	2–2	(Spain) Villarreal
Erdoğan 26'; César Prates 51'	Report	Anderson 6'; Riquelme 21'

Atatürk Olympic Stadium, Istanbul
Attendance: 34,778
Referee: Stefano Farina (Italy)
3 March 2004
21:30

Villarreal (Spain)	3–0	(Turkey) Galatasaray
Anderson 48'; Roger García 52'; Riquelme 88'	Report

Estadio El Madrigal, Villarreal
Attendance: 8,397
Referee: Jan Wegereef (Netherlands)

Villarreal won 5–2 on aggregate.

26 February 2004
20:30

Club Brugge (Belgium)	1–0	(Hungary) Debrecen
Lange 40'	Report

Jan Breydel Stadium, Bruges
Attendance: 20,538
Referee: Emil Bozinovski (Macedonia)
3 March 2004
19:00

Debrecen (Hungary)	0–0	(Belgium) Club Brugge
	Report

Stadion Oláh Gábor Út, Debrecen
Attendance: 6,900
Referee: Arturo Daudén Ibáñez (Spain)

Club Brugge won 1–0 on aggregate.

26 February 2004
21:00

Sochaux (France)	2–2	(Italy) Internazionale
Frau 59', 81'	Report	Vieri 8'; Recoba 61'

Stade Auguste Bonal, Montbéliard
Attendance: 19,561
Referee: Luis Medina Cantalejo (Spain)
3 March 2004
20:45

Internazionale (Italy)	0–0	(France) Sochaux
	Report

San Siro, Milan
Attendance: 15,883
Referee: Steve Bennett (England)

2–2 on aggregate; Internazionale won on away goals.

26 February 2004
21:00

Liverpool (England)	2–0	(Bulgaria) Levski Sofia
Gerrard 67'; Kewell 70'	Report

Anfield, Liverpool
Attendance: 39,149
Referee: René Temmink (Netherlands)
3 March 2004
20:10

Levski Sofia (Bulgaria)	2–4	(England) Liverpool
G. Ivanov 27'; Simonović 40'	Report	Gerrard 7'; Owen 11'; Hamann 43'; Hyypiä 68'

Vasil Levski National Stadium, Sofia
Attendance: 40,281
Referee: Peter Fröjdfeldt (Sweden)

Liverpool won 6–2 on aggregate.

26 February 2004
17:00

Spartak Moscow (Russia)	0–3	(Spain) Mallorca
	Report	Eto'o 67'; Toni González 81'; Jesús Perera 85'

Lokomotiv Stadium, Moscow
Attendance: 13,000
Referee: Alon Yefet (Israel)
3 March 2004
21:00

Mallorca (Spain)	0–1	(Russia) Spartak Moscow
	Report	Samedov 44'

Son Moix, Palma de Mallorca
Attendance: 6,664
Referee: Stéphane Bré (France)

Mallorca won 3–1 on aggregate.

26 February 2004
18:00

Gaziantepspor (Turkey)	1–0	(Italy) Roma
Şimşek 19'	Report

Kamil Ocak Stadium, Gaziantep
Attendance: 12,765
Referee: Yuri Baskakov (Russia)
3 March 2004
17:30

Roma (Italy)	2–0	(Turkey) Gaziantepspor
Emerson 23'; Cassano 43'	Report

Stadio Olimpico, Rome
Attendance: 11,191
Referee: Alain Hamer (Luxembourg)

Roma won 2–1 on aggregate.

26 February 2004
20:00

Auxerre (France)	0–0	(Greece) Panathinaikos
	Report

Stade de l'Abbé-Deschamps, Auxerre
Attendance: 12,388
Referee: Stuart Dougal (Scotland)
3 March 2004
20:30

Panathinaikos (Greece)	0–1	(France) Auxerre
	Report	Kalou 71'

Leoforos Alexandras Stadium, Athens
Attendance: 12,262
Referee: Florian Meyer (Germany)

Auxerre won 1–0 on aggregate.

26 February 2004
17:00

Vålerenga (Norway)	1–1	(England) Newcastle United
Normann 54'	Report	Bellamy 38'

Ullevaal Stadion, Oslo
Attendance: 17,039
Referee: Grzegorz Gilewski (Poland)
3 March 2004
20:45

Newcastle United (England)	3–1	(Norway) Vålerenga
Shearer 20'; Ameobi 47', 89'	Report	Hagen 25'

St James' Park, Newcastle upon Tyne
Attendance: 38,531
Referee: Eric Braamhaar (Netherlands)

Newcastle United won 4–2 on aggregate.

== Fourth round ==
The draw for the fourth round was held on 4 March 2004, 14:00 CET.

=== Summary ===
The first legs were played on 11 March, and the second legs were played on 25 March 2004.

Team 1	Agg.	Team 2	1st leg	2nd leg
Celtic (Scotland)	1–0	(Spain) Barcelona	1–0	0–0
Gençlerbirliği (Turkey)	1–2	(Spain) Valencia	1–0	0–2 (a.e.t.)
Bordeaux (France)	4–1	(Belgium) Club Brugge	3–1	1–0
Newcastle United (England)	7–1	(Spain) Mallorca	4–1	3–0
Auxerre (France)	1–4	(Netherlands) PSV Eindhoven	1–1	0–3
Benfica (Portugal)	3–4	(Italy) Internazionale	0–0	3–4
Liverpool (England)	2–3	(France) Marseille	1–1	1–2
Villarreal (Spain)	3–2	(Italy) Roma	2–0	1–2

=== Matches ===
11 March 2004
20:00

Celtic (Scotland)	1–0	(Spain) Barcelona
Thompson 59'	Report

Celtic Park, Glasgow
Attendance: 59,539
Referee: Wolfgang Stark (Germany)
25 March 2004
21:00

Barcelona (Spain)	0–0	(Scotland) Celtic
	Report

Camp Nou, Barcelona
Attendance: 77,108
Referee: Domenico Messina (Italy)

Celtic won 1–0 on aggregate.

11 March 2004
19:30

Gençlerbirliği (Turkey)	1–0	(Spain) Valencia
Daems 12' (pen.)	Report

Ankara 19 Mayıs Stadium, Ankara
Attendance: 17,214
Referee: Tom Henning Øvrebø (Norway)
25 March 2004
21:30

Valencia (Spain)	2–0 (a.e.t.)	(Turkey) Gençlerbirliği
Mista 63'; Vicente 94'	Report

Mestalla, Valencia
Attendance: 20,700
Referee: René Temmink (Netherlands)

Valencia won 2–1 on aggregate.

11 March 2004
19:00

Bordeaux (France)	3–1	(Belgium) Club Brugge
Celades 60', 71'; Riera 87'	Report	Verheyen 58'

Stade Chaban-Delmas, Bordeaux
Attendance: 14,398
Referee: Steve Bennett (England)
25 March 2004
19:30

Club Brugge (Belgium)	0–1	(France) Bordeaux
	Report	Chamakh 84'

Jan Breydel Stadium, Bruges
Attendance: 23,713
Referee: Massimo De Santis (Italy)

Bordeaux won 4–1 on aggregate.

11 March 2004
20:45

Newcastle United (England)	4–1	(Spain) Mallorca
Bellamy 67'; Shearer 71'; Robert 74'; Bramble 84'	Report	Correa 58'

St James' Park, Newcastle upon Tyne
Attendance: 38,012
Referee: Alain Hamer (Luxembourg)
25 March 2004
21:00

Mallorca (Spain)	0–3	(England) Newcastle United
	Report	Shearer 46', 89'; Bellamy 78'

Son Moix, Palma de Mallorca
Attendance: 7,612
Referee: Konrad Plautz (Austria)

Newcastle United won 7–1 on aggregate.

11 March 2004
20:30

Auxerre (France)	1–1	(Netherlands) PSV Eindhoven
Tainio 36'	Report	Lucius 71'

Stade de l'Abbé-Deschamps, Auxerre
Attendance: 8,557
Referee: Massimo Busacca (Switzerland)
25 March 2004
20:30

PSV Eindhoven (Netherlands)	3–0	(France) Auxerre
Kežman 4', 27'; Van Bommel 73'	Report

Philips Stadion, Eindhoven
Attendance: 28,000
Referee: Graham Poll (England)

PSV Eindhoven won 4–1 on aggregate.

11 March 2004
21:00

Benfica (Portugal)	0–0	(Italy) Internazionale
	Report

Estádio da Luz, Lisbon
Attendance: 64,569
Referee: Jan Wegereef (Netherlands)
25 March 2004
21:00

Internazionale (Italy)	4–3	(Portugal) Benfica
Martins 45+1', 70'; Recoba 60'; Vieri 64'	Report	Nuno Gomes 36', 67'; Tiago 77'

San Siro, Milan
Attendance: 27,640
Referee: Alain Sars (France)

Internazionale won 4–3 on aggregate.

11 March 2004
21:00

Liverpool (England)	1–1	(France) Marseille
Baroš 55'	Report	Drogba 79'

Anfield, Liverpool
Attendance: 41,270
Referee: Yuri Baskakov (Russia)
25 March 2004
21:00

Marseille (France)	2–1	(England) Liverpool
Drogba 38' (pen.); Méïté 58'	Report	Heskey 15'

Stade Vélodrome, Marseille
Attendance: 54,160
Referee: Arturo Dauden Ibañez (Spain)

Marseille won 3–2 on aggregate.

11 March 2004
21:30

Villarreal (Spain)	2–0	(Italy) Roma
Anderson 29'; José Mari 35'	Report

Estadio El Madrigal, Vilarreal
Attendance: 13,654
Referee: Frank De Bleeckere (Belgium)
25 March 2004
20:45

Roma (Italy)	2–1	(Spain) Villarreal
Emerson 10'; Cassano 50'	Report	Anderson 66'

Stadio Olimpico, Rome
Attendance: 29,088
Referee: Gilles Veissière (France)

Villarreal won 3–2 on aggregate.

== Quarter-finals ==
The draw for the quarter-finals was held on 4 March 2004, 14:00 CET, immediately after the fourth round draw.

=== Summary ===
The first legs were played on 8 April, and the second legs were played on 14 April 2004.

Team 1	Agg.	Team 2	1st leg	2nd leg
Bordeaux (France)	2–4	(Spain) Valencia	1–2	1–2
Marseille (France)	2–0	(Italy) Internazionale	1–0	1–0
Celtic (Scotland)	1–3	(Spain) Villarreal	1–1	0–2
PSV Eindhoven (Netherlands)	2–3	(England) Newcastle United	1–1	1–2

=== Matches ===
8 April 2004
19:15

Bordeaux (France)	1–2	(Spain) Valencia
Riera 18'	Report	Baraja 75'; Rufete 88'

Stade Chaban-Delmas, Bordeaux
Attendance: 29,108
Referee: Mike Riley (England)
14 April 2004
21:45

Valencia (Spain)	2–1	(France) Bordeaux
Pellegrino 52'; Rufete 60'	Report	Eduardo 71'

Mestalla Stadium, Valencia
Attendance: 24,537
Referee: Herbert Fandel (Germany)

Valencia won 4–2 on aggregate.

8 April 2004
21:00

Marseille (France)	1–0	(Italy) Internazionale
Drogba 46'	Report

Stade Vélodrome, Marseille
Attendance: 56,277
Referee: Lucílio Batista (Portugal)
14 April 2004
20:45

Internazionale (Italy)	0–1	(France) Marseille
	Report	Meriem 74'

San Siro, Milan
Attendance: 36,044
Referee: Kim Milton Nielsen (Denmark)

Marseille won 2–0 on aggregate.

8 April 2004
21:00

Celtic (Scotland)	1–1	(Spain) Villarreal
Larsson 64'	Report	Josico 9'

Celtic Park, Glasgow
Attendance: 58,493
Referee: Kyros Vassaras (Greece)
14 April 2004
20:00

Villarreal (Spain)	2–0	(Scotland) Celtic
Anderson 6'; Roger 68'	Report

Estadio El Madrigal, Villarreal
Attendance: 15,964
Referee: Massimo De Santis (Italy)

Villarreal won 3–1 on aggregate.

8 April 2004
20:45

PSV Eindhoven (Netherlands)	1–1	(England) Newcastle United
Kežman 15'	Report	Jenas 45+4'

Philips Stadion, Eindhoven
Attendance: 30,000
Referee: Gilles Veissière (France)
14 April 2004
20:45

Newcastle United (England)	2–1	(Netherlands) PSV Eindhoven
Shearer 9'; Speed 66'	Report	Kežman 52' (pen.)

St James' Park, Newcastle upon Tyne
Attendance: 50,083
Referee: Manuel Mejuto González (Spain)

Newcastle United won 3–2 on aggregate.

== Semi-finals ==
The draw for the semi-finals was held on 4 March 2004, 14:00 CET, immediately after the fourth round and quarter-final draws.

=== Summary ===
The first legs were played on 22 April, and the second legs were played on 6 May 2004.

Team 1	Agg.	Team 2	1st leg	2nd leg
Newcastle United (England)	0–2	(France) Marseille	0–0	0–2
Villarreal (Spain)	0–1	(Spain) Valencia	0–0	0–1

=== Matches ===
22 April 2004
20:45

Newcastle United (England)	0–0	(France) Marseille
	Report

St James' Park, Newcastle upon Tyne
Attendance: 52,004
Referee: Valentin Ivanov (Russia)
6 May 2004
21:00

Marseille (France)	2–0	(England) Newcastle United
Drogba 18', 82'	Report

Stade Vélodrome, Marseille
Attendance: 58,897
Referee: Ľuboš Micheľ (Slovakia)

Marseille won 2–0 on aggregate.

22 April 2004
21:45

Villarreal (Spain)	0–0	(Spain) Valencia
	Report

Estadio El Madrigal, Villarreal
Attendance: 21,446
Referee: Lucílio Batista (Portugal)
6 May 2004
21:45

Valencia (Spain)	1–0	(Spain) Villarreal
Mista 16' (pen.)	Report

Mestalla Stadium, Valencia
Attendance: 46,860
Referee: Terje Hauge (Norway)

Valencia won 1–0 on aggregate.

== Final ==
The final was played on 19 May 2004 at the Ullevi in Gothenburg, Sweden. A draw was held on 4 March 2004 (after the fourth round, quarter-final and semi-final draws) to determine the "home" team for administrative purposes.

19 May 2004
20:45 UTC+2

Valencia (Spain)	2–0	(France) Marseille
Vicente 45+3' (pen.); Mista 58'	Report

Ullevi, Gothenburg
Attendance: 39,000
Referee: Pierluigi Collina (Italy)
