= 2004 UEFA Cup final =

- Match programme cover
- Event: 2003–04 UEFA Cup
Valencia	Marseille
(Spain)	(France)
2	0
- Date: 19 May 2004
- Venue: Ullevi, Gothenburg
- Man of the Match: Roberto Ayala (Valencia)
- Referee: Pierluigi Collina (Italy)
- Attendance: 39,000
- Weather: Partly cloudy 10 °C (50 °F)

The 2004 UEFA Cup final was an association football match that took place on 19 May 2004 at Ullevi in Gothenburg, Sweden, contested between Spanish side Valencia and French side Olympique de Marseille. Valencia won the match 2–0, with goals from Vicente and Mista. This was the fourth major European trophy won by Valencia.

== Route to the final ==
=== Valencia ===
Round	(Spain) Valencia			
UEFA Cup
Round	Opponent	Agg.	1st leg	2nd leg
First round	(Sweden) AIK	2–0	1–0 (A)	1–0 (H)
Second round	(Israel) Maccabi Haifa	4–0	0–0 (H)	4–0 (A)
Third round	(Turkey) Beşiktaş	5–2	3–2 (H)	2–0 (A)
Fourth round	(Turkey) Gençlerbirliği	2–1 (a.e.t.)	0–1 (A)	2–0 (a.e.t.) (H)
Quarter-finals	(France) Bordeaux	4–2	2–1 (A)	2–1 (H)
Semi-finals	(Spain) Villarreal	1–0	0–0 (A)	1–0 (H)

=== Marseille ===
Round	(France) Marseille			
Champions League
Qualifying stage	Opponent	Agg.	1st leg	2nd leg
Third qualifying round	Austria Wien	1–0	1–0 (A)	0–0 (H)
Group stage	Opponent	Result		
Matchday 1	(Spain) Real Madrid	2–4 (A)		
Matchday 2	(Serbia and Montenegro) Partizan	3–0 (H)		
Matchday 3	(Portugal) Porto	2–3 (H)		
Matchday 4	(Portugal) Porto	0–1 (A)		
Matchday 5	(Spain) Real Madrid	1–2 (H)		
Matchday 6	(Serbia and Montenegro) Partizan	1–1 (A)		
Final standings	Group F third place: Pos / Team / Pld / Pts; 1 / (Spain) Real Madrid / 6 / 14; 2 / (Portugal) Porto / 6 / 11; 3 / (France) Marseille / 6 / 4; 4 / (Serbia and Montenegro) Partizan / 6 / 3; Source: RSSSF			
UEFA Cup
Round	Opponent	Agg.	1st leg	2nd leg
Third round	(Ukraine) Dnipro Dnipropetrovsk	1–0	1–0 (H)	0–0 (A)
Fourth round	(England) Liverpool	3–2	1–1 (A)	2–1 (H)
Quarter-finals	(Italy) Internazionale	2–0	1–0 (H)	1–0 (A)
Semi-finals	(England) Newcastle United	2–0	0–0 (A)	2–0 (H)

== Match ==
=== Summary ===
Valencia had been on a 14-match unbeaten run previous to this match, which had only ended the previous week to Villarreal, the side they beat in the semi-final to reach the final, due to a weakened lineup after securing the La Liga title. In contrast, Marseille had lost four of their last five matches in Ligue 1.

The start of the match was conservative due to the wind. Didier Drogba threatened early on, and was sent tumbling by a robust challenge from Roberto Ayala, which led to a free kick, in which the resulting shot was cleared off the line by Carlos Marchena. This sparked Valencia into life and David Albelda produced a save from Fabien Barthez after pouncing on Mista's rebounded shot.

Valencia dominated possession, which led to frustration, and Steve Marlet getting booked in the tenth minute. Marseille's first meaningful attempt at goal came in the 16th minute when Steve Marlet headed over from Camel Meriem's cross. Minutes later, Meriem himself had a chance to give Marseille the lead, but he shot wide from the edge of the area. Marseille had another chance when Habib Beye got on the end of Drogba's free kick, but he headed wide. The definitive moment in the match came on the stroke of half time, when Barthez brought down Mista in the area after a cross by Curro Torres. Barthez was sent off and Valencia were awarded a penalty. Jérémy Gavanon replaced Barthez with Camel Meriem making way for him. Vicente dispatched the penalty to give Valencia a 1–0 lead going into half time.

The second half started off with Valencia in total ascendancy, and after 13 minutes of near-total possession, Valencia doubled their lead. Vicente had cut the ball in from the left for Mista, who finished the chance with ease to record his fifth goal of the competition. Marseille's heads inevitably dropped. They came forward in flourishes in the last remnants of the game, however, when Drogba's free kick was stopped by Santiago Cañizares. Drogba also nearly played in Steve Marlet with a through-ball, but it was intercepted at the last second. Marseille almost found a way back into the Valencia goal area in the 80th minute, but Sylvain N'Diaye's shot was saved by Cañizares.

After this, the match descended into a stoic affair and Valencia ran out winners to win their first major European trophy in 24 years, and victory after two successive UEFA Champions League final defeats, in 2000 and 2001. The victory also meant that Amedeo Carboni became the oldest player to win a European final at 39 years and 43 days old.

=== Details ===
19 May 2004
20:45 UTC+2

Valencia (Spain)	2–0	(France) Marseille
Vicente 45+3' (pen.); Mista 58'	Report

Ullevi, Gothenburg
Attendance: 39,000
Referee: Pierluigi Collina (Italy)

Valencia	Marseille

GK	1	(Spain) Santiago Cañizares
RB	23	(Spain) Curro Torres
CB	4	(Argentina) Roberto Ayala
CB	5	(Spain) Carlos Marchena		(substituted off) 86'
LB	15	(Italy) Amedeo Carboni	(yellow card) 34'
RM	19	(Spain) Francisco Rufete		(substituted off) 64'
CM	6	(Spain) David Albelda (c)
CM	8	(Spain) Rubén Baraja
LM	14	(Spain) Vicente	(yellow card) 27'
SS	10	(Spain) Miguel Ángel Angulo		(substituted off) 82'
CF	20	(Spain) Mista
Substitutes:
GK	13	(Spain) Andrés Palop
DF	2	(Argentina) Mauricio Pellegrino		(substituted on) 86'
DF	3	(Brazil) Fábio Aurélio
MF	21	(Argentina) Pablo Aimar		(substituted on) 64'
MF	25	(Mali) Mohamed Sissoko		(substituted on) 82'
FW	11	(Spain) Juan Sánchez
FW	24	(Spain) Xisco
Manager:
(Spain) Rafael Benítez

GK	28	(France) Fabien Barthez	(red card) 45'
CB	23	(Senegal) Habib Beye
CB	6	(Algeria) Brahim Hemdani (c)
CB	12	(Ivory Coast) Abdoulaye Méïté
RWB	2	(Brazil) Demetrius Ferreira
LWB	3	(France) Manuel dos Santos
CM	32	(France) Mathieu Flamini		(substituted off) 71'
CM	7	(Senegal) Sylvain N'Diaye		(substituted off) 84'
RW	20	(France) Steve Marlet	(yellow card) 10'
LW	18	(France) Camel Meriem		(substituted off) 45'
CF	11	(Ivory Coast) Didier Drogba	(yellow card) 60'
Substitutes:
GK	30	(France) Jérémy Gavanon		(substituted on) 45'
DF	5	(France) Philippe Christanval
DF	21	(France) Johnny Ecker
MF	14	(Czech Republic) Štěpán Vachoušek
MF	26	(France) Laurent Batlles		(substituted on) 71'
MF	29	(Switzerland) Fabio Celestini		(substituted on) 84'
MF	33	(France) Nicolas Cicut
Manager:
(France) José Anigo

Man of the Match:
Roberto Ayala (Valencia)

Assistant referees:
Marco Ivaldi (Italy)
Narciso Pisacreta (Italy)
Fourth official:
Roberto Rosetti (Italy)

Match rules

- 90 minutes
- 30 minutes of silver goal extra time if necessary
- Penalty shoot-out if scores still level
- Seven named substitutes
- Maximum of three substitutions

=== Statistics ===
First half
Statistic	Valencia	Marseille
Goals scored	1	0
Total shots	5	4
Shots on target	3	0
Ball possession	50%	50%
Corner kicks	3	1
Fouls committed	16	11
Offsides	0	1
Yellow cards	2	1
Red cards	0	1

Second half
Statistic	Valencia	Marseille
Goals scored	1	0
Total shots	5	7
Shots on target	2	3
Ball possession	58%	42%
Corner kicks	0	3
Fouls committed	10	13
Offsides	2	0
Yellow cards	0	1
Red cards	0	0

Overall
Statistic	Valencia	Marseille
Goals scored	2	0
Total shots	10	11
Shots on target	5	3
Ball possession	54%	46%
Corner kicks	3	4
Fouls committed	26	24
Offsides	2	1
Yellow cards	2	2
Red cards	0	1

== See also ==
- 2004 UEFA Champions League final
- 2004 UEFA Super Cup
- Olympique de Marseille in European football
- Valencia CF in European football
- 2003–04 Olympique de Marseille season
- 2003–04 Valencia CF season
