= 2003–04 UEFA Cup second round =

The 2003–04 UEFA Cup second round was played from 29 October to 11 December 2003. The round consisted of 24 ties, with the winners advancing to the third round of the 2003–04 UEFA Cup.

All match times are CET (UTC+1), as listed by UEFA.

== Draw ==
The draw was held on 17 October 2003, 12:00 CEST, at the UEFA headquarters in Nyon, Switzerland. Teams were divided into geographical groups, each with seeded and unseeded pots.

== Summary ==
The second round featured the 48 winners of the first round. The first legs were played on 29 October and 6 November, and the second legs were played on 27 November and 11 December 2003.

| Team 1 | Agg. | Team 2 | 1st leg | 2nd leg |
|---|---|---|---|---|
| Rosenborg (Norway) | 1–0 | (Serbia and Montenegro) Red Star Belgrade | 0–0 | 1–0 |
| Dinamo Zagreb (Croatia) | 1–3 | (Ukraine) Dnipro Dnipropetrovsk | 0–2 | 1–1 |
| Borussia Dortmund (Germany) | 2–6 | (France) Sochaux | 2–2 | 0–4 |
| Manchester City (England) | 1–1 (a) | (Poland) Groclin Grodzisk Wielkopolski | 1–1 | 0–0 |
| Benfica (Portugal) | 5–1 | (Norway) Molde | 3–1 | 2–0 |
| Slavia Prague (Czech Republic) | 2–2 (a) | (Bulgaria) Levski Sofia | 2–2 | 0–0 |
| Spartak Moscow (Russia) | 5–3 | (Romania) Dinamo București | 4–0 | 1–3 |
| Gaziantepspor (Turkey) | 6–1 | (France) Lens | 3–0 | 3–1 |
| Schalke 04 (Germany) | 3–3 (1–3 p) | (Denmark) Brøndby | 2–1 | 1–2 (a.e.t.) |
| Perugia (Italy) | 3–1 | (Greece) Aris | 2–0 | 1–1 |
| Utrecht (Netherlands) | 0–4 | (France) Auxerre | 0–0 | 0–4 |
| Steaua București (Romania) | 1–2 | (England) Liverpool | 1–1 | 0–1 |
| Vålerenga (Norway) | 0–0 (4–3 p) | (Poland) Wisła Kraków | 0–0 | 0–0 (a.e.t.) |
| PAOK (Greece) | 1–1 (a) | (Hungary) Debrecen | 1–1 | 0–0 |
| Copenhagen (Denmark) | 2–3 | (Spain) Mallorca | 1–2 | 1–1 |
| Basel (Switzerland) | 2–4 | (England) Newcastle United | 2–3 | 0–1 |
| Roma (Italy) | 2–1 | (Croatia) Hajduk Split | 1–0 | 1–1 |
| Gençlerbirliği (Turkey) | 4–1 | (Portugal) Sporting CP | 1–1 | 3–0 |
| Villarreal (Spain) | 2–1 | (Russia) Torpedo Moscow | 2–0 | 0–1 |
| Feyenoord (Netherlands) | 1–3 | (Czech Republic) Teplice | 0–2 | 1–1 |
| Bordeaux (France) | 2–1 | (Scotland) Heart of Midlothian | 0–1 | 2–0 |
| Panionios (Greece) | 0–5 | (Spain) Barcelona | 0–3 | 0–2 |
| Wüstenrot Salzburg (Austria) | 0–9 | (Italy) Parma | 0–4 | 0–5 |
| Valencia (Spain) | 4–0 | (Israel) Maccabi Haifa | 0–0 | 4–0 |

== Matches ==
29 October 2003
20:00

| Rosenborg (Norway) | 0–0 | (Serbia and Montenegro) Red Star Belgrade |
|---|---|---|
| | Report |

Lerkendal Stadium, Trondheim
Attendance: 12,632
Referee: Steve Bennett (England)
27 November 2003
19:00

| Red Star Belgrade (Serbia and Montenegro) | 0–1 | (Norway) Rosenborg |
|---|---|---|
| | Report | Brattbakk 50' |

Red Star Stadium, Belgrade
Attendance: 46,022
Referee: Paulo Costa (Portugal)

Rosenborg won 1–0 on aggregate.

6 November 2003
17:30

| Dinamo Zagreb (Croatia) | 0–2 | (Ukraine) Dnipro Dnipropetrovsk |
|---|---|---|
| | Report | Venhlinskyi 8'; Maksymyuk 84' |

Stadion Maksimir, Zagreb
Attendance: 6,129
Referee: Fritz Stuchlik (Austria)
27 November 2003
17:00

| Dnipro Dnipropetrovsk (Ukraine) | 1–1 | (Croatia) Dinamo Zagreb |
|---|---|---|
| Venhlinskyi 64' | Report | Sedloski 62' |

Meteor Stadium, Dnipropetrovsk
Attendance: 20,000
Referee: Zsolt Szabó (Hungary)

Dnipro Dnipropetrovsk won 3–1 on aggregate.

6 November 2003
20:30

| Borussia Dortmund (Germany) | 2–2 | (France) Sochaux |
|---|---|---|
| Senesie 68'; Ewerthon 78' | Report | Santos 12'; Frau 27' |

Westfalenstadion, Dortmund
Attendance: 40,100
Referee: Vladimír Hriňák (Slovakia)
27 November 2003
20:30

| Sochaux (France) | 4–0 | (Germany) Borussia Dortmund |
|---|---|---|
| Frau 5' (pen.); Santos 67'; Oruma 76'; Mathieu 89' | Report |

Stade Auguste Bonal, Montbéliard
Attendance: 18,584
Referee: Yuri Baskakov (Russia)

Sochaux won 6–2 on aggregate.

6 November 2003
21:00

| Manchester City (England) | 1–1 | (Poland) Groclin Grodzisk Wielkopolski |
|---|---|---|
| Anelka 5' | Report | Mila 65' |

City of Manchester Stadium, Manchester
Attendance: 32,509
Referee: Georgios Kasnaferis (Greece)
27 November 2003
16:15

| Groclin Grodzisk Wielkopolski (Poland) | 0–0 | (England) Manchester City |
|---|---|---|
| | Report |

Stadion Dyskobolia, Grodzisk Wielkopolski
Attendance: 4,000
Referee: Peter Fröjdfeldt (Sweden)

1–1 on aggregate; Groclin Grodzisk Wielkopolski won on away goals.

6 November 2003
22:00

| Benfica (Portugal) | 3–1 | (Norway) Molde |
|---|---|---|
| Nuno Gomes 20', 54'; Geovanni 51' | Report | Hestad 76' |

Estádio da Luz, Lisbon
Attendance: 30,780
Referee: Hermann Albrecht (Germany)
27 November 2003
20:00

| Molde (Norway) | 0–2 | (Portugal) Benfica |
|---|---|---|
| | Report | Tiago Mendes 30', 42' |

Molde Stadion, Molde
Attendance: 4,181
Referee: Andy D'Urso (England)

Benfica won 5–1 on aggregate.

6 November 2003
17:00

| Slavia Prague (Czech Republic) | 2–2 | (Bulgaria) Levski Sofia |
|---|---|---|
| Kuka 22'; Fořt 90+2' | Report | Ivanov 78'; Müller 90+1' (o.g.) |

Stadion Evžena Rošického, Prague
Attendance: 4,000
Referee: Mike McCurry (Scotland)
27 November 2003
16:00

| Levski Sofia (Bulgaria) | 0–0 | (Czech Republic) Slavia Prague |
|---|---|---|
| | Report |

Georgi Asparuhov Stadium, Sofia
Attendance: 23,000
Referee: Nicolai Vollquartz (Denmark)

2–2 on aggregate; Levski Sofia won on away goals.

6 November 2003
17:00

| Spartak Moscow (Russia) | 4–0 | (Romania) Dinamo București |
|---|---|---|
| Pjanović 23', 62'; Kalynychenko 59'; Pavlenko 73' | Report |

Lokomotiv Stadium, Moscow
Attendance: 10,000
Referee: Dick van Egmond (Netherlands)
27 November 2003
19:00

| Dinamo București (Romania) | 3–1 | (Russia) Spartak Moscow |
|---|---|---|
| Dănciulescu 28', 73' (pen.); Iordache 58' | Report | Parfenov 85' (pen.) |

Stadionul Dinamo, Bucharest
Attendance: 10,000
Referee: Costas Kapitanis (Cyprus)

Spartak Moscow won 5–3 on aggregate.

6 November 2003
16:45

| Gaziantepspor (Turkey) | 3–0 | (France) Lens |
|---|---|---|
| Devran 43'; Bouazizi 59'; Lazarov 65' | Report |

Kamil Ocak Stadium, Gaziantep
Attendance: 4,010
Referee: Dejan Delević (Serbia and Montenegro)
27 November 2003
18:30

| Lens (France) | 1–3 | (Turkey) Gaziantepspor |
|---|---|---|
| Fanni 73' | Report | Bölükbaşı 40'; Namlı 55'; Lazarov 85' (pen.) |

Stade Félix-Bollaert, Lens
Attendance: 37,372
Referee: Stefan Messner (Austria)

Gaziantepspor won 6–1 on aggregate.

6 November 2003
18:00

| Schalke 04 (Germany) | 2–1 | (Denmark) Brøndby |
|---|---|---|
| Hanke 60', 73' | Report | Jakobsson 35' |

Arena AufSchalke, Gelsenkirchen
Attendance: 50,538
Referee: Alain Sars (France)
27 November 2003
18:15

| Brøndby (Denmark) | 2–1 (a.e.t.) | (Germany) Schalke 04 |
|---|---|---|
| Jakobsson 16' (pen.); Jonson 71' | Report | Agali 55' |
Penalties
| Johansen (penalty scored); Jakobsson (penalty missed); Kahlenberg (penalty scored); Foldgast (penalty scored) | 3–1 | (penalty scored) Vermant; (penalty missed) Altıntop; (penalty missed) Matellan; (penalty missed) Hajto |

Brøndby Stadium, Brøndbyvester
Attendance: 25,817
Referee: Michal Beneš (Czech Republic)

3–3 on aggregate; Brøndby won 3–1 on penalties.

6 November 2003
20:45

| Perugia (Italy) | 2–0 | (Greece) Aris |
|---|---|---|
| Margiotta 47', 86' (pen.) | Report |

Stadio Renato Curi, Perugia
Attendance: 5,744
Referee: Fernando Carmona Méndez (Spain)
27 November 2003
19:30

| Aris (Greece) | 1–1 | (Italy) Perugia |
|---|---|---|
| Papadopoulos 90+4' | Report | Margiotta 29' |

Toumba Stadium, Thessaloniki
Attendance: 13,008
Referee: Philippe Leuba (Switzerland)

Perugia won 3–1 on aggregate.

6 November 2003
18:30

| Utrecht (Netherlands) | 0–0 | (France) Auxerre |
|---|---|---|
| | Report |

Stadion Galgenwaard, Utrecht
Attendance: 16,251
Referee: Leslie Irvine (Northern Ireland)
27 November 2003
20:30

| Auxerre (France) | 4–0 | (Netherlands) Utrecht |
|---|---|---|
| Cissé 22', 48'; Kapo 29'; Kalou 56' | Report |

Stade de l'Abbé-Deschamps, Auxerre
Attendance: 8,823
Referee: Karel Vidlak (Czech Republic)

Auxerre won 4–0 on aggregate.

6 November 2003
20:00

| Steaua București (Romania) | 1–1 | (England) Liverpool |
|---|---|---|
| Răducanu 68' | Report | Traoré 22' |

Stadionul Steaua, Bucharest
Attendance: 18,785
Referee: Stefano Farina (Italy)
27 November 2003
21:00

| Liverpool (England) | 1–0 | (Romania) Steaua București |
|---|---|---|
| Kewell 50' | Report |

Anfield, Liverpool
Attendance: 42,837
Referee: Florian Meyer (Germany)

Liverpool won 2–1 on aggregate.

6 November 2003
18:30

| Vålerenga (Norway) | 0–0 | (Poland) Wisła Kraków |
|---|---|---|
| | Report |

Ullevaal Stadion, Oslo
Attendance: 3,716
Referee: Serhiy Shebek (Ukraine)
27 November 2003
20:00

| Wisła Kraków (Poland) | 0–0 (a.e.t.) | (Norway) Vålerenga |
|---|---|---|
| | Report |
Penalties
| Głowacki (penalty scored); Paszulewicz (penalty scored); Frankowski (penalty missed); Szymkowiak (penalty missed); Żurawski (penalty scored) | 3–4 | (penalty scored) Rekdal; (penalty scored) Hanssen; (penalty scored) Edvardsen; (penalty missed) Bolthof; (penalty scored) Bohinen |

Stadion Miejski, Kraków
Attendance: 6,300
Referee: Antonio Costa (Portugal)

0–0 on aggregate; Vålerenga won 4–3 on penalties.

6 November 2003
20:15

| PAOK (Greece) | 1–1 | (Hungary) Debrecen |
|---|---|---|
| Karadimos 17' | Report | Bajzát 25' |

Toumba Stadium, Thessaloniki
Attendance: 8,701
Referee: Edo Trivković (Croatia)
27 November 2003
17:00

| Debrecen (Hungary) | 0–0 | (Greece) PAOK |
|---|---|---|
| | Report |

Stadion Oláh Gábor Út, Debrecen
Attendance: 6,429
Referee: Alon Yefet (Israel)

1–1 on aggregate; Debrecen won on away goals.

6 November 2003
20:15

| Copenhagen (Denmark) | 1–2 | (Spain) Mallorca |
|---|---|---|
| Álvaro 32' | Report | Albrechtsen 28' (o.g.); Nagore 74' |

Parken Stadium, Copenhagen
Attendance: 20,487
Referee: Roberto Rosetti (Italy)
27 November 2003
21:00

| Mallorca (Spain) | 1–1 | (Denmark) Copenhagen |
|---|---|---|
| Campano 68' | Report | Albrechtsen 87' |

Son Moix, Palma de Mallorca
Attendance: 8,200
Referee: Franz-Xaver Wack (Germany)

Mallorca won 3–2 on aggregate.

6 November 2003
20:30

| Basel (Switzerland) | 2–3 | (England) Newcastle United |
|---|---|---|
| Cantaluppi 11'; Chipperfield 15' | Report | Robert 13'; Bramble 37'; Ameobi 75' |

St. Jakob-Park, Basel
Attendance: 30,000
Referee: Tom Henning Øvrebø (Norway)
27 November 2003
20:30

| Newcastle United (England) | 1–0 | (Switzerland) Basel |
|---|---|---|
| Smiljanić 14' (o.g.) | Report |

St James' Park, Newcastle upon Tyne
Attendance: 40,387
Referee: Knud Erik Fisker (Denmark)

Newcastle United won 4–2 on aggregate.

6 November 2003
21:00

| Roma (Italy) | 1–0 | (Croatia) Hajduk Split |
|---|---|---|
| Cassano 90+1' | Report |

Stadio Olimpico, Rome
Attendance: 16,709
Referee: Luis Medina Cantalejo (Spain)
27 November 2003
20:45

| Hajduk Split (Croatia) | 1–1 | (Italy) Roma |
|---|---|---|
| Bule 33' | Report | Cassano 85' |

Stadion Poljud, Split
Attendance: 27,300
Referee: Stuart Dougal (Scotland)

Roma won 2–1 on aggregate.

6 November 2003
19:00

| Gençlerbirliği (Turkey) | 1–1 | (Portugal) Sporting CP |
|---|---|---|
| Veysel 55' | Report | Liédson 50' |

19 Mayıs Stadyumu, Ankara
Attendance: 9,429
Referee: Sorin Corpodean (Romania)
27 November 2003
22:00

| Sporting CP (Portugal) | 0–3 | (Turkey) Gençlerbirliği |
|---|---|---|
| | Report | Tandoğan 44'; Mário Sérgio 45' (o.g.); Veysel 48' |

Estádio José Alvalade, Lisbon
Attendance: 27,494
Referee: Johan Verbist (Belgium)

Gençlerbirliği won 4–1 on aggregate.

6 November 2003
20:00

| Villarreal (Spain) | 2–0 | (Russia) Torpedo Moscow |
|---|---|---|
| Riquelme 51', 68' | Report |

Estadio El Madrigal, Villarreal
Attendance: 7,520
Referee: Emil Bozinovski (Macedonia)
27 November 2003
17:30

| Torpedo Moscow (Russia) | 1–0 | (Spain) Villarreal |
|---|---|---|
| Semshov 73' | Report |

Luzhniki Stadium, Moscow
Attendance: 6,000
Referee: Martin Ingvarsson (Sweden)

Villarreal won 2–1 on aggregate.

6 November 2003
20:45

| Feyenoord (Netherlands) | 0–2 | (Czech Republic) Teplice |
|---|---|---|
| | Report | Doležal 3'; Rezek 52' |

De Kuip, Rotterdam
Attendance: 23,000
Referee: Athanassios Briakos (Greece)
27 November 2003
18:00

| Teplice (Czech Republic) | 1–1 | (Netherlands) Feyenoord |
|---|---|---|
| Horvath 40' | Report | Snoyl 36' |

Na Stínadlech, Teplice
Attendance: 16,900
Referee: Bertrand Layec (France)

Teplice won 3–1 on aggregate.

6 November 2003
18:30

| Bordeaux (France) | 0–1 | (Scotland) Heart of Midlothian |
|---|---|---|
| | Report | de Vries 79' |

Stade Chaban-Delmas, Bordeaux
Attendance: 15,377
Referee: Kristinn Jakobsson (Iceland)
27 November 2003
20:45

| Heart of Midlothian (Scotland) | 0–2 | (France) Bordeaux |
|---|---|---|
| | Report | Riera 8'; Feindouno 66' |

Tynecastle Stadium, Edinburgh
Attendance: 17,587
Referee: Grzegorz Gilewski (Poland)

Bordeaux won 2–1 on aggregate.

6 November 2003
19:00

| Panionios (Greece) | 0–3 | (Spain) Barcelona |
|---|---|---|
| | Report | Luis García 43'; Kluivert 47'; Xavi 90+2' |

Nea Smyrni Stadium, Athens
Attendance: 8,679
Referee: Jacek Granat (Poland)
27 November 2003
21:15

| Barcelona (Spain) | 2–0 | (Greece) Panionios |
|---|---|---|
| Saviola 33'; Luis García 44' | Report |

Camp Nou, Barcelona
Attendance: 25,324
Referee: Claude Colombo (France)

Barcelona won 5–0 on aggregate.

6 November 2003
20:30

| Wüstenrot Salzburg (Austria) | 0–4 | (Italy) Parma |
|---|---|---|
| | Report | Filippini 60' (pen.); Gilardino 65'; Nakata 84'; Rosina 87' |

Linzer Stadion, Linz
Attendance: 6,060
Referee: Eduardo Iturralde González (Spain)
27 November 2003
18:00

| Parma (Italy) | 5–0 | (Austria) Wüstenrot Salzburg |
|---|---|---|
| Carbone 1', 7'; Filippini 43'; Sorrentino 47', 87' | Report |

Stadio Ennio Tardini, Parma
Attendance: 3,305
Referee: Nikolai Ivanov (Russia)

Parma won 9–0 on aggregate.

6 November 2003
22:00

| Valencia (Spain) | 0–0 | (Israel) Maccabi Haifa |
|---|---|---|
| | Report |

Mestalla Stadium, Valencia
Attendance: 21,338
Referee: Kenny Clark (Scotland)
11 December 2003 (Note: Due to security issues caused by the Second Intifada, Israeli teams were required to play their home matches at neutral venues until further notice. Therefore, Maccabi Haifa were originally scheduled to play their second round home match on 27 November 2003 at İzmir Alsancak Stadium, İzmir, Turkey, instead of their usual stadium, Kiryat Eliezer Stadium, Haifa. However, due to the 2003 Istanbul bombings, the match was postponed to 11 December 2003 and relocated to Sparta Stadion, Rotterdam, Netherlands.)
20:00

| Maccabi Haifa (Israel) | 0–4 | (Spain) Valencia |
|---|---|---|
| | Report | Mista 11'; Baraja 24'; Albelda 90+1'; Angulo 90+2' |

Sparta Stadion, Rotterdam, Netherlands
Attendance: 2,333
Referee: Eric Braamhaar (Netherlands)

Valencia won 4–0 on aggregate.
