= 2003–04 UEFA Cup first round =

The 2003–04 UEFA Cup first round was played from 24 September to 16 October 2003. The round consisted of 48 ties, with the winners advancing to the second round of the 2003–04 UEFA Cup.

All times are CEST (UTC+2), as listed by UEFA.

== Draw ==
The draw was held on 29 August 2003, 13:00 CEST, at the Grimaldi Forum in Monaco. Teams were divided into geographical groups, each with seeded and unseeded pots.

== Summary ==
The first round featured the 41 winners of the qualifying round, joined by 36 directly qualified teams, the 16 losers of the Champions League third qualifying round and the 3 winners for the Intertoto Cup. The first legs were played on 24 and 25 September, and the second legs were played on 15 and 16 October 2003.

Team 1	Agg.	Team 2	1st leg	2nd leg
AIK (Sweden)	0–2	(Spain) Valencia	0–1	0–1
Dinamo București (Romania)	5–2	(Ukraine) Shakhtar Donetsk	2–0	3–2
Maccabi Haifa (Israel)	4–3	(Slovenia) Publikum	2–1	2–2
Dundee (Scotland)	1–3	(Italy) Perugia	1–2	0–1
Cementarnica 55 (North Macedonia)	0–6	(France) Lens	0–1	0–5
Newcastle United (England)	6–0	(Netherlands) NAC Breda	5–0	1–0
Panionios (Greece)	3–1	(Denmark) Nordsjælland	2–1	1–0
Heart of Midlothian (Scotland)	2–0	(Bosnia and Herzegovina) Željezničar	2–0	0–0
Gençlerbirliği (Turkey)	4–2	(England) Blackburn Rovers	3–1	1–1
Matador Púchov (Slovakia)	1–9	(Spain) Barcelona	1–1	0–8
Dinamo Zagreb (Croatia)	3–1	(Hungary) MTK Hungária	3–1	0–0
Hapoel Ramat Gan (Israel)	0–5	(Bulgaria) Levski Sofia	0–1	0–4
Sartid (Serbia and Montenegro)	2–4	(Czech Republic) Slavia Prague	1–2	1–2
Villarreal (Spain)	3–2	(Turkey) Trabzonspor	0–0	3–2
Grasshopper (Switzerland)	1–1 (a)	(Croatia) Hajduk Split	1–1	0–0
Hertha BSC (Germany)	0–1	(Poland) Groclin Grodzisk Wielkopolski	0–0	0–1
Vålerenga (Norway)	1–1 (a)	(Austria) GAK	0–0	1–1
Zimbru Chișinău (Moldova)	2–3	(Greece) Aris	1–1	1–2
Varteks (Croatia)	3–6	(Hungary) Debrecen	1–3	2–3
União de Leiria (Portugal)	2–3	(Norway) Molde	1–0	1–3
Austria Wien	1–3	(Germany) Borussia Dortmund	1–2	0–1
Auxerre (France)	2–0	(Switzerland) Neuchâtel Xamax	1–0	1–0
Ventspils (Latvia)	1–10	(Norway) Rosenborg	1–4	0–6
Gaziantepspor (Turkey)	1–0	(Israel) Hapoel Tel Aviv	1–0	0–0
Odense (Denmark)	5–6	(Serbia and Montenegro) Red Star Belgrade	2–2	3–4
Sporting CP (Portugal)	3–0	(Sweden) Malmö FF	2–0	1–0
Utrecht (Netherlands)	6–0	(Slovakia) Žilina	2–0	4–0
Metalurh Donetsk (Ukraine)	1–4	(Italy) Parma	1–1	0–3
MYPA (Finland)	0–3	(France) Sochaux	0–1	0–2
Southampton (England)	1–2	(Romania) Steaua București	1–1	0–1
Roma (Italy)	5–1	(North Macedonia) Vardar	4–0	1–1
Manchester City (England)	4–2	(Belgium) Lokeren	3–2	1–0
Spartak Moscow (Russia)	3–1	(Denmark) Esbjerg	2–0	1–1
CSKA Sofia (Bulgaria)	2–2 (2–3 p)	(Russia) Torpedo Moscow	1–1	1–1 (a.e.t.)
Ferencváros (Hungary)	2–2 (2–3 p)	(Denmark) Copenhagen	1–1	1–1 (a.e.t.)
APOEL (Cyprus)	3–6	(Spain) Mallorca	1–2	2–4
Olimpija Ljubljana (Slovenia)	1–4	(England) Liverpool	1–1	0–3
PAOK (Greece)	3–1	(Norway) Lyn	0–1	3–0
Malatyaspor (Turkey)	2–3	(Switzerland) Basel	0–2	2–1 (a.e.t.)
La Louvière (Belgium)	1–2	(Portugal) Benfica	1–1	0–1
Wüstenrot Salzburg (Austria)	2–2 (a)	(Italy) Udinese	0–1	2–1
Brøndby (Denmark)	2–0	(Czech Republic) Viktoria Žižkov	1–0	1–0
1. FC Kaiserslautern (Germany)	1–3	(Czech Republic) Teplice	1–2	0–1
Hamburger SV (Germany)	2–4	(Ukraine) Dnipro Dnipropetrovsk	2–1	0–3
Bordeaux (France)	3–2	(Slovakia) Artmedia Petržalka	2–1	1–1
Wisła Kraków (Poland)	4–2	(Netherlands) NEC	2–1	2–1
Kamen Ingrad (Croatia)	0–1	(Germany) Schalke 04	0–0	0–1
Feyenoord (Netherlands)	3–1	(Austria) Kärnten	2–1	1–0

== Matches ==
24 September 2003
20:30

AIK (Sweden)	0–1	(Spain) Valencia
	Report	Oliveira 64'

Råsunda Stadium, Solna
Attendance: 25,433
Referee: Hermann Albrecht (Germany)
15 October 2003
21:45

Valencia (Spain)	1–0	(Sweden) AIK
Mista 71'	Report

Mestalla Stadium, Valencia
Attendance: 21,441
Referee: Johan Verbist (Belgium)

Valencia won 2–0 on aggregate.

24 September 2003
20:00

Dinamo București (Romania)	2–0	(Ukraine) Shakhtar Donetsk
Niculescu 87'; Zicu 88'	Report

Stadionul Dinamo, Bucharest
Attendance: 7,500
Referee: Bernhard Brugger (Austria)
15 October 2003
19:00

Shakhtar Donetsk (Ukraine)	2–3	(Romania) Dinamo București
Aghahowa 18', 45+1'	Report	Niculescu 30'; Marica 75'; Dănciulescu 87'

Shakhtar Stadium, Donetsk
Attendance: 30,500
Referee: Tomasz Mikulski (Poland)

Dinamo București won 5–2 on aggregate.

24 September 2003
19:30

Maccabi Haifa (Israel)	2–1	(Slovenia) Publikum
Badir 8'; Katan 84'	Report	Kvas 90'

İzmir Alsancak Stadium, İzmir, Turkey (Note: Due to security issues caused by the Second Intifada, Israeli teams were required to play their home matches at neutral venues until further notice.)
Attendance: 200
Referee: Sergei Shebek (Ukraine)
15 October 2003
19:00

Publikum (Slovenia)	2–2	(Israel) Maccabi Haifa
Koren 42', 59'	Report	Tal 62'; Roso 84'

Arena Petrol, Celje
Attendance: 2,500
Referee: Víctor Esquinas Torres (Spain)

Maccabi Haifa won 4–3 on aggregate.

24 September 2003
20:05

Dundee (Scotland)	1–2	(Italy) Perugia
Wilkie 64'	Report	Di Loreto 51'; Fusani 84'

Dens Park, Dundee
Attendance: 9,111
Referee: Željko Širić (Croatia)
15 October 2003
20:30

Perugia (Italy)	1–0	(Scotland) Dundee
Margiotta 72'	Report

Stadio Renato Curi, Perugia
Attendance: 8,685
Referee: Vladimír Hriňák (Slovakia)

Perugia won 3–1 on aggregate.

24 September 2003
18:00

Cementarnica 55 (North Macedonia)	0–1	(France) Lens
	Report	Diop 90'

Gradski stadion, Skopje
Attendance: 3,300
Referee: René Rogalla (Switzerland)
15 October 2003
20:30

Lens (France)	5–0	(North Macedonia) Cementarnica 55
Coridon 14'; Moreira 45'; Utaka 52' (pen.); Coulibaly 56'; Bakari 90'	Report

Stade Félix-Bollaert, Lens
Attendance: 22,671
Referee: Costas Kapitanis (Cyprus)

Lens won 6–0 on aggregate.

24 September 2003
20:45

Newcastle United (England)	5–0	(Netherlands) NAC Breda
Bellamy 31', 37'; Bramble 59'; Shearer 77'; Ambrose 89'	Report

St James' Park, Newcastle upon Tyne
Attendance: 36,007
Referee: Nikolai Ivanov (Russia)
15 October 2003
20:15

NAC Breda (Netherlands)	0–1	(England) Newcastle United
	Report	Robert 86'

Rat Verlegh Stadion, Breda
Attendance: 15,564
Referee: Espen Berntsen (Norway)

Newcastle United won 6–0 on aggregate.

24 September 2003
16:30

Panionios (Greece)	2–1	(Denmark) Nordsjælland
Smiljanić 29'; Majewski 32'	Report	Ziberi 67'

Nea Smyrni Stadium, Athens
Attendance: 2,996
Referee: Karel Vidlak (Czech Republic)
15 October 2003
18:00

Nordsjælland (Denmark)	0–1	(Greece) Panionios
	Report	Raguel 90+5'

Farum Park, Farum
Attendance: 2,606
Referee: Philppe Leuba (Switzerland)

Panionios won 3–1 on aggregate.

24 September 2003
20:45

Heart of Midlothian (Scotland)	2–0	(Bosnia and Herzegovina) Željezničar
De Vries 28'; Webster 58'	Report

Tynecastle Stadium, Edinburgh
Attendance: 15,830
Referee: Jack van Hulten (Netherlands)
15 October 2003
20:15

Željezničar (Bosnia and Herzegovina)	0–0	(Scotland) Heart of Midlothian
	Report

Koševo Stadium, Sarajevo
Attendance: 6,102
Referee: Anton Stredák (Slovakia)

Heart of Midlothian won 2–0 on aggregate.

24 September 2003
16:55

Gençlerbirliği (Turkey)	3–1	(England) Blackburn Rovers
Skoko 41'; Youla 42', 59'	Report	Emerton 56'

Ankara 19 Mayıs Stadium, Ankara
Attendance: 14,102
Referee: Paolo Bertini (Italy)
15 October 2003
21:15

Blackburn Rovers (England)	1–1	(Turkey) Gençlerbirliği
Jansen 65'	Report	Özkan 67'

Ewood Park, Blackburn
Attendance: 14,573
Referee: Eric Braamhaar (Netherlands)

Gençlerbirliği won 4–2 on aggregate.

24 September 2003
19:00

Matador Púchov (Slovakia)	1–1	(Spain) Barcelona
Jambor 90+3'	Report	Kluivert 49'

Štadión Antona Malatinského, Trnava
Attendance: 18,500
Referee: Kuddusi Müftüoğlu (Turkey)
15 October 2003
21:30

Barcelona (Spain)	8–0	(Slovakia) Matador Púchov
Ronaldinho 7', 20', 57'; Motta 41'; Luis Enrique 64', 75'; Saviola 73', 89'	Report

Camp Nou, Barcelona
Attendance: 29,701
Referee: Nicolai Vollquartz (Denmark)

Barcelona won 9–1 on aggregate.

24 September 2003
17:30

Dinamo Zagreb (Croatia)	3–1	(Hungary) MTK Hungária
Eduardo 37'; Agić 47'; Sedloski 55' (pen.)	Report	Torghelle 2'

Stadion Maksimir, Zagreb
Attendance: 8,100
Referee: Serge Gumienny (Belgium)
15 October 2003
20:15

MTK Hungária (Hungary)	0–0	(Croatia) Dinamo Zagreb
	Report

Hidegkuti Nándor Stadium, Budapest
Attendance: 1,830
Referee: Kristinn Jakobsson (Iceland)

Dinamo Zagreb won 3–1 on aggregate.

24 September 2003
15:30

Hapoel Ramat Gan (Israel)	0–1	(Bulgaria) Levski Sofia
	Report	B. Dimitrov 80'

Mestský Stadion, Dunajská Streda, Slovakia
Attendance: 1,200
Referee: Lawrence Sammut (Malta)
15 October 2003
17:30

Levski Sofia (Bulgaria)	4–0	(Israel) Hapoel Ramat Gan
Chilikov 23'; G. Ivanov 75'; Simonović 79'; Demba-Nyren 90'	Report

Georgi Asparuhov Stadium, Sofia
Attendance: 2,545
Referee: Georgios Douros (Greece)

Levski Sofia won 5–0 on aggregate.

24 September 2003
16:30

Sartid (Serbia and Montenegro)	1–2	(Czech Republic) Slavia Prague
Kocić 90+3'	Report	Dosek 44'; Bejbl 45+1' (pen.)

Smederevo City Stadium, Smederevo
Attendance: 6,665
Referee: Carlos Megia Davila (Spain)
15 October 2003
18:00

Slavia Prague (Czech Republic)	2–1	(Serbia and Montenegro) Sartid
Dostalek 6'; Adauto 23'	Report	Mirosavljević 47'

Stadion Evžena Rošického, Prague
Attendance: 4,243
Referee: Dick van Egmond (Netherlands)

Slavia Prague won 4–2 on aggregate.

24 September 2003
22:00

Villarreal (Spain)	0–0	(Turkey) Trabzonspor
	Report

Estadio El Madrigal, Villarreal
Attendance: 12,493
Referee: Laurent Duhamel (France)
15 October 2003
19:00

Trabzonspor (Turkey)	2–3	(Spain) Villarreal
Gökdeniz 72'; Tekke 82'	Report	Anderson 60'; José Mari 66', 90'

Hüseyin Avni Aker Stadium, Trabzon
Attendance: 10,761
Referee: Markus Nobs (Switzerland)

Villarreal won 3–2 on aggregate.

24 September 2003
19:30

Grasshopper (Switzerland)	1–1	(Croatia) Hajduk Split
Eduardo 40'	Report	Neretljak 56'

Hardturm, Zürich
Attendance: 8,100
Referee: Alan Kelly (Republic of Ireland)
15 October 2003
17:30

Hajduk Split (Croatia)	0–0	(Switzerland) Grasshopper
	Report

Stadion Poljud, Split
Attendance: 15,833
Referee: Ruud Bossen (Netherlands)

1–1 on aggregate; Hajduk Split won on away goals.

24 September 2003
17:30

Hertha BSC (Germany)	0–0	(Poland) Groclin Grodzisk Wielkopolski
	Report

Olympiastadion, Berlin
Attendance: 23,142
Referee: Fernando Carmona Méndez (Spain)
15 October 2003
17:30

Groclin Grodzisk Wielkopolski (Poland)	1–0	(Germany) Hertha BSC
Rasiak 84'	Report

Stadion Dyskobolia, Grodzisk Wielkopolski
Attendance: 4,450
Referee: Paulo Paraty (Portugal)

Groclin Grodzisk Wielkopolski won 1–0 on aggregate.

24 September 2003
18:00

Vålerenga (Norway)	0–0	(Austria) GAK
	Report

Ullevaal Stadion, Oslo
Attendance: 2,594
Referee: Paulius Malžinskas (Lithuania)
15 October 2003
18:00

GAK (Austria)	1–1	(Norway) Vålerenga
Ramusch 32'	Report	Berre 59'

Arnold Schwarzenegger Stadium, Graz
Attendance: 7,464
Referee: Dejan Stanišić (Serbia and Montenegro)

1–1 on aggregate; Vålerenga won on away goals.

24 September 2003
18:00

Zimbru Chișinău (Moldova)	1–1	(Greece) Aris
Bălaşa 57'	Report	Mallous 25'

Sheriff Stadium, Tiraspol
Attendance: 3,600
Referee: Draženko Kovačić (Croatia)
15 October 2003
20:30

Aris (Greece)	2–1	(Moldova) Zimbru Chișinău
Koltsidas 44'; Lazanas 85'	Report	Shishelov 19'

Makedonikos Stadium, Thessaloniki
Attendance: 4,504
Referee: Alon Yefet (Israel)

Aris won 3–2 on aggregate.

24 September 2003
18:00

Varteks (Croatia)	1–3	(Hungary) Debrecen
Kastel 45'	Report	Sándor 24'; Kiss 57'; Dombi 88'

Stadion Varteks, Varaždin
Attendance: 2,100
Referee: David Malcolm (Northern Ireland)
15 October 2003
18:00

Debrecen (Hungary)	3–2	(Croatia) Varteks
Granić 45' (o.g.); Kiss 45+2'; Habi 90'	Report	Šafarić 26'; Vučković 58'

Stadion Oláh Gábor Út, Debrecen
Attendance: 6,004
Referee: Ceri Richards (Wales)

Debrecen won 6–3 on aggregate.

24 September 2003
18:00

União de Leiria (Portugal)	1–0	(Norway) Molde
Caíco 56'	Report

Estádio Dr. Magalhães Pessoa, Leiria
Attendance: 1,550
Referee: Alexandru Tudor (Romania)
15 October 2003
19:00

Molde (Norway)	3–1	(Portugal) União de Leiria
Hoseth 35' (pen.), 78' (pen.); Hestad 51'	Report	Maciel 58'

Molde Stadion, Molde
Attendance: 1,787
Referee: Viktor Kassai (Hungary)

Molde won 3–2 on aggregate.

24 September 2003
20:40

Austria Wien	1–2	(Germany) Borussia Dortmund
Janočko 39'	Report	Addo 38'; Ricken 67'

Ernst-Happel-Stadion, Vienna
Attendance: 30,500
Referee: Stuart Dougal (Scotland)
15 October 2003
20:30

Borussia Dortmund (Germany)	1–0	Austria Wien
Ricken 16'	Report

Westfalenstadion, Dortmund
Attendance: 50,500
Referee: Antonio Manuel Almeida Costa (Portugal)

Borussia Dortmund won 3–1 on aggregate.

24 September 2003
20:45

Auxerre (France)	1–0	(Switzerland) Neuchâtel Xamax
Kalou 6'	Report

Stade Abbé-Deschamps, Auxerre
Attendance: 6,155
Referee: Anton Genov (Bulgaria)
15 October 2003
20:15

Neuchâtel Xamax (Switzerland)	0–1	(France) Auxerre
	Report	Lachuer 53'

La Maladière, Neuchâtel
Attendance: 5,585
Referee: Andy D'Urso (England)

Auxerre won 2–0 on aggregate.

24 September 2003
19:00

Ventspils (Latvia)	1–4	(Norway) Rosenborg
Rimkus 81' (pen.)	Report	Johnsen 23'; Stensaas 32'; Storflor 39'; Brattbakk 68'

Daugava Stadium, Liepāja
Attendance: 1,500
Referee: Paul McKeon (Republic of Ireland)
15 October 2003
18:30

Rosenborg (Norway)	6–0	(Latvia) Ventspils
Karadas 17'; Brattbakk 29', 90+2'; Hoftun 45'; Solli 57'; Lukaševičs 90' (o.g.)	Report

Lerkendal Stadion, Trondheim
Attendance: 17,077
Referee: Mikko Vuorela (Finland)

Rosenborg won 10–1 on aggregate.

24 September 2003
19:00

Gaziantepspor (Turkey)	1–0	(Israel) Hapoel Tel Aviv
Özer 86'	Report

Kamil Ocak Stadium, Gaziantep
Attendance: 5,896
Referee: Jacek Granat (Poland)
15 October 2003
17:00

Hapoel Tel Aviv (Israel)	0–0	(Turkey) Gaziantepspor
	Report

Het Kasteel, Rotterdam, Netherlands
Attendance: 2,650
Referee: Vitaliy Hodulian (Ukraine)

Gaziantepspor won 1–0 on aggregate.

24 September 2003
20:05

Odense (Denmark)	2–2	(Serbia and Montenegro) Red Star Belgrade
Miti 17'; Borre 90+2'	Report	Žigić 22', 64'

Odense Stadion, Odense
Attendance: 7,795
Referee: Romans Lajuks (Latvia)
15 October 2003
20:15

Red Star Belgrade (Serbia and Montenegro)	4–3	(Denmark) Odense
Žigić 3'; Vidić 12', 86'; Djordjic 27'	Report	Stokholm 11'; Hojer 39'; Lindrup 78'

Red Star Stadium, Belgrade
Attendance: 25,281
Referee: Bertrand Layec (France)

Red Star Belgrade won 6–5 on aggregate.

24 September 2003
22:00

Sporting CP (Portugal)	2–0	(Sweden) Malmö FF
Luís Lourenço 15'; Liedson 85'	Report

Estádio José Alvalade, Lisbon
Attendance: 25,500
Referee: Roberto Rosetti (Italy)
15 October 2003
20:15

Malmö FF (Sweden)	0–1	(Portugal) Sporting CP
	Report	Liedson 49'

Malmö Stadion, Malmö
Attendance: 6,360
Referee: Uriah Rennie (England)

Sporting CP won 3–0 on aggregate.

24 September 2003
18:30

Utrecht (Netherlands)	2–0	(Slovakia) Žilina
van de Haar 44'; Tanghe 85'	Report

Stadion Galgenwaard, Utrecht
Attendance: 0 (Note: The match was played behind closed doors.)
Referee: Anthony Zammit (Malta)
15 October 2003
18:00

Žilina (Slovakia)	0–4	(Netherlands) Utrecht
	Report	van de Haar 20', 66'; Lamey 79'; Tanghe 82'

Štadión pod Dubňom, Žilina
Attendance: 3,373
Referee: Edo Trivković (Croatia)

Utrecht won 6–0 on aggregate.

24 September 2003
19:00

Metalurh Donetsk (Ukraine)	1–1	(Italy) Parma
Shyshchenko 44'	Report	Adriano 67'

RSC Olimpiyskiy, Donetsk
Attendance: 17,000
Referee: Tonny Kolbech Poulsen (Denmark)
15 October 2003
20:45

Parma (Italy)	3–0	(Ukraine) Metalurh Donetsk
Gilardino 44', 46'; Marchionni 73'	Report

Stadio Ennio Tardini, Parma
Attendance: 8,308
Referee: Leif Sundell (Sweden)

Parma won 4–1 on aggregate.

24 September 2003
18:00

MYPA (Finland)	0–1	(France) Sochaux
	Report	Diawara 45'

Saviniemen Jalkapallostadion, Anjalankoski
Attendance: 2,275
Referee: Michael Weiner (Germany)
15 October 2003
19:15

Sochaux (France)	2–0	(Finland) MYPA
Monsoreau 58'; Santos 82'	Report

Stade Auguste Bonal, Montbéliard
Attendance: 8,885
Referee: Selçuk Dereli (Turkey)

Sochaux won 3–0 on aggregate.

24 September 2003
20:45

Southampton (England)	1–1	(Romania) Steaua București
Phillips 52'	Report	Răducanu 20'

St Mary's Stadium, Southampton
Attendance: 30,577
Referee: Tommy Skjerven (Norway)
15 October 2003
18:45

Steaua București (Romania)	1–0	(England) Southampton
Răducanu 83'	Report

Stadionul Steaua, Bucharest
Attendance: 22,800
Referee: Stefan Johannesson (Sweden)

Steaua București won 2–1 on aggregate.

24 September 2003
21:00

Roma (Italy)	4–0	(North Macedonia) Vardar
Dellas 15'; De Rossi 21'; Carew 54'; Delvecchio 90+2'	Report

Stadio Olimpico, Rome
Attendance: 25,000
Referee: Florian Meyer (Germany)
15 October 2003
18:00

Vardar (North Macedonia)	1–1	(Italy) Roma
Zaharievski 40'	Report	Mancini 63'

Gradski stadion, Skopje
Attendance: 4,000
Referee: Miroslav Liba (Czech Republic)

Roma won 5–1 on aggregate.

24 September 2003
21:00

Manchester City (England)	3–2	(Belgium) Lokeren
Sibierski 8'; Fowler 77'; Anelka 80' (pen.)	Report	Zoundi 14'; Kristinsson 40'

City of Manchester Stadium, Manchester
Attendance: 29,067
Referee: Grzegorz Gilewski (Poland)
15 October 2003
20:30

Lokeren (Belgium)	0–1	(England) Manchester City
	Report	Anelka 19' (pen.)

Daknamstadion, Lokeren
Attendance: 8,335
Referee: Damien Ledentu (France)

Manchester City won 4–2 on aggregate.

24 September 2003
18:00

Spartak Moscow (Russia)	2–0	(Denmark) Esbjerg
Pavlenko 14'; Kalynychenko 33'	Report

Dynamo Stadium, Moscow
Attendance: 10,500
Referee: Petteri Kari (Finland)
15 October 2003
18:00

Esbjerg (Denmark)	1–1	(Russia) Spartak Moscow
Jørgensen 88'	Report	Pavlyuchenko 43'

Aarhus Stadium, Aarhus (Note: Match played at Aarhus Stadium, Aarhus, instead of Esbjerg's regular stadium, Esbjerg Stadium, Esbjerg.)
Attendance: 6,448
Referee: Cristian Balaj (Romania)

Spartak Moscow won 3–1 on aggregate.

24 September 2003
16:00

CSKA Sofia (Bulgaria)	1–1	(Russia) Torpedo Moscow
V. Dimitrov 18'	Report	Semshov 78'

Balgarska Armia Stadium, Sofia
Attendance: 7,832
Referee: Jouni Hyytiä (Finland)
15 October 2003
16:00

Torpedo Moscow (Russia)	1–1 (a.e.t.)	(Bulgaria) CSKA Sofia
Oper 11'	Report	V. Dimitrov 90+2'
Penalties
Leonchenko (penalty missed); Volkov (penalty scored); Lebedenko (penalty missed); Jolović (penalty scored); Budylin (penalty scored)	3–2	(penalty missed) V. Dimitrov; (penalty scored) Leo Lima; (penalty missed) João Carlos; (penalty scored) Kolev; (penalty missed) Brito

Eduard Streltsov Stadium, Moscow
Attendance: 4,000
Referee: Roland Beck (Liechtenstein)

2–2 on aggregate; Torpedo Moscow won 3–2 on penalties.

24 September 2003
20:15

Ferencváros (Hungary)	1–1	(Denmark) Copenhagen
Kriston 37'	Report	Jónson 1'

Üllői úti stadion, Budapest
Attendance: 6,715
Referee: Jaroslav Jara (Czech Republic)
15 October 2003
20:05

Copenhagen (Denmark)	1–1 (a.e.t.)	(Hungary) Ferencváros
Nielsen 90+1' (pen.)	Report	Lipcsei 84'
Penalties
Christiansen (penalty scored); Nielsen (penalty scored); Møller (penalty missed); Røll (penalty missed); Santos (penalty scored)	3–2	(penalty scored) Gera; (penalty missed) Sasu; (penalty missed) Lipcsei; (penalty missed) Leandro; (penalty scored) Szűcs

Parken Stadium, Copenhagen
Attendance: 16,597
Referee: Ivan Dobrinov (Bulgaria)

2–2 on aggregate; Copenhagen won 3–2 on penalties.

24 September 2003
20:30

APOEL (Cyprus)	1–2	(Spain) Mallorca
Papandreou 46'	Report	Toni González 22'; Bruggink 54'

GSP Stadium, Nicosia
Attendance: 5,696
Referee: Mark Halsey (England)
15 October 2003
21:00

Mallorca (Spain)	4–2	(Cyprus) APOEL
Eto'o 30', 62', 67'; Correa 89'	Report	Okkarides 10'; Amanatidis 90'

Son Moix, Palma de Mallorca
Attendance: 8,178
Referee: Damir Skomina (Slovenia)

Mallorca won 6–3 on aggregate.

24 September 2003
20:15

Olimpija Ljubljana (Slovenia)	1–1	(England) Liverpool
Žlogar 66'	Report	Owen 78'

Bežigrad Stadium, Ljubljana
Attendance: 6,543
Referee: Julian Rodriguez Santiago (Spain)
15 October 2003
21:00

Liverpool (England)	3–0	(Slovenia) Olimpija Ljubljana
Le Tallec 30'; Heskey 37'; Kewell 47'	Report

Anfield, Liverpool
Attendance: 42,880
Referee: Stefan Messner (Austria)

Liverpool won 4–1 on aggregate.

24 September 2003
20:30

PAOK (Greece)	0–1	(Norway) Lyn
	Report	Sigurðsson 39'

Toumba Stadium, Thessaloniki
Attendance: 7,221
Referee: Attila Hanacsek (Hungary)
15 October 2003
19:00

Lyn (Norway)	0–3	(Greece) PAOK
	Report	Yiasoumi 51'; Koutsis 61'; Vokolos 68'

Ullevaal Stadion, Oslo
Attendance: 2,068
Referee: Darko Čeferin (Slovenia)

PAOK won 3–1 on aggregate.

24 September 2003
19:00

Malatyaspor (Turkey)	0–2	(Switzerland) Basel
	Report	M. Yakin 15'; H. Yakin 75'

Malatya İnönü Stadium, Malatya
Attendance: 7,057
Referee: Marian Mircea Salomir (Romania)
15 October 2003
19:30

Basel (Switzerland)	1–2 (a.e.t.)	(Turkey) Malatyaspor
Streller 95'	Report	Koçak 65', 85'

St. Jakob-Park, Basel
Attendance: 26,663
Referee: Attila Juhos (Hungary)

Basel won 3–2 on aggregate.

24 September 2003
20:00

La Louvière (Belgium)	1–1	(Portugal) Benfica
Odemwingie 14'	Report	Simão 52'

Stade du Pays de Charleroi, Charleroi
Attendance: 14,200
Referee: Yuri Baskakov (Russia)
15 October 2003
22:00

Benfica (Portugal)	1–0	(Belgium) La Louvière
Fehér 58'	Report

Estádio do Bessa, Porto
Attendance: 9,634
Referee: Pascal Garibian (France)

Benfica won 2–1 on aggregate.

24 September 2003
18:00

Wüstenrot Salzburg (Austria)	0–1	(Italy) Udinese
	Report	Fava 36'

Linzer Stadion, Linz
Attendance: 9,400
Referee: Emil Bozinovski (Macedonia)
15 October 2003
20:45

Udinese (Italy)	1–2	(Austria) Wüstenrot Salzburg
Bertotto 14'	Report	Hässler 61'; Eder 77'

Stadio Friuli, Udine
Attendance: 18,095
Referee: Athanassios Briakos (Greece)

2–2 on aggregate; Wüstenrot Salzburg won on away goals.

24 September 2003
18:00

Brøndby (Denmark)	1–0	(Czech Republic) Viktoria Žižkov
Jonson 64'	Report

Brøndby Stadium, Brøndbyvester
Attendance: 8,939
Referee: Gylfi Orrason (Iceland)
16 October 2003
15:00

Viktoria Žižkov (Czech Republic)	0–1	(Denmark) Brøndby
	Report	Daugaard 88'

FK Viktoria Stadion, Prague
Attendance: 3,162
Referee: Gerald Lehner (Austria)

Brøndby won 2–0 on aggregate.

24 September 2003
18:30

1. FC Kaiserslautern (Germany)	1–2	(Czech Republic) Teplice
Klose 58'	Report	Rezek 7'; Benčík 64'

Fritz-Walter-Stadion, Kaiserslautern
Attendance: 18,511
Referee: Rob Styles (England)
16 October 2003
17:30

Teplice (Czech Republic)	1–0	(Germany) 1. FC Kaiserslautern
Benčík 71'	Report

Na Stínadlech, Teplice
Attendance: 14,300
Referee: Martin Hansson (Sweden)

Teplice won 3–1 on aggregate.

25 September 2003
19:00

Hamburger SV (Germany)	2–1	(Ukraine) Dnipro Dnipropetrovsk
Hoogma 49' (pen.); Romeo 81'	Report	Venhlinskyi 10'

AOL Arena, Hamburg
Attendance: 26,831
Referee: Martin Ingvarsson (Sweden)
15 October 2003
19:00

Dnipro Dnipropetrovsk (Ukraine)	3–0	(Germany) Hamburger SV
Mykhaylenko 5'; Rykun 68'; Venhlinskyi 79'	Report

Meteor Stadium, Dnipropetrovsk
Attendance: 21,000
Referee: Douglas McDonald (Scotland)

Dnipro Dnipropetrovsk won 4–2 on aggregate.

25 September 2003
20:45

Bordeaux (France)	2–1	(Slovakia) Artmedia Petržalka
Riera 7'; Darcheville 36'	Report	Krejčí 16'

Stade Chaban-Delmas, Bordeaux
Attendance: 11,461
Referee: Jörg Keßler (Germany)
15 October 2003
18:45

Artmedia Petržalka (Slovakia)	1–1	(France) Bordeaux
Krejčí 90'	Report	Darcheville 85'

Tehelné pole, Bratislava
Attendance: 3,300
Referee: Dejan Delević (Serbia and Montenegro)

Bordeaux won 3–2 on aggregate.

25 September 2003
20:00

Wisła Kraków (Poland)	2–1	(Netherlands) NEC
Frankowski 29', 56'	Report	de Nooijer 65' (pen.)

Stadion Miejski, Kraków
Attendance: 4,200
Referee: Levan Paniashvili (Georgia)
15 October 2003
20:30

NEC (Netherlands)	1–2	(Poland) Wisła Kraków
Zonneveld 33'	Report	Frankowski 45', 68'

Goffertstadion, Nijmegen
Attendance: 10,865
Referee: Zsolt Szabó (Hungary)

Wisła Kraków won 4–2 on aggregate.

25 September 2003
17:30

Kamen Ingrad (Croatia)	0–0	(Germany) Schalke 04
	Report

Stadion Kamen Ingrad, Velika
Attendance: 6,850
Referee: Pasquale Rodomonti (Italy)
16 October 2003
20:30

Schalke 04 (Germany)	1–0	(Croatia) Kamen Ingrad
Hanke 76'	Report

Arena AufSchalke, Gelsenkirchen
Attendance: 52,600
Referee: Olegário Benquerença (Portugal)

Schalke 04 won 1–0 on aggregate.

25 September 2003
20:30

Feyenoord (Netherlands)	2–1	(Austria) Kärnten
Kuyt 63'; Buffel 76'	Report	Marić 56'

De Kuip, Rotterdam
Attendance: 21,000
Referee: Kenny Clark (Scotland)
16 October 2003
20:30

Kärnten (Austria)	0–1	(Netherlands) Feyenoord
	Report	Buffel 14'

Wortherseestadion, Klagenfurt
Attendance: 6,267
Referee: Loizos Loizou (Cyprus)

Feyenoord won 3–1 on aggregate.
