= Sylvain N'Diaye =

Footballer (born 1976)

Personal information
- Full name: Sylvain Patrick Jean N'Diaye
- Date of birth: 25 June 1976 (age 50)
- Place of birth: Paris, France
- Height: 1.79 m (5 ft 10 in)
- Position: Defensive midfielder

Senior career*
| Years | Team | Apps | (Gls) |
| 1996–1998 | Bordeaux | 1 | (0) |
| 1997–1998 | → FC Martigues (loan) | 34 | (1) |
| 1998–2000 | Gent | 11 | (0) |
| 1999 | → Monaco (loan) | 11 | (2) |
| 1999–2000 | → Toulouse (loan) | 37 | (2) |
| 2000–2003 | Lille | 88 | (3) |
| 2003–2005 | Marseille | 42 | (1) |
| 2005–2008 | Levante | 44 | (2) |
| 2007–2008 | → Tenerife (loan) | 29 | (1) |
| 2008–2010 | Reims | 34 | (0) |
| 2010–2011 | Cannes | 28 | (0) |
| Total | | 359 | (12) |

International career
| 2001–2004 | Senegal | 24 | (0) |
- * Club domestic league appearances and goals

Sylvain Patrick Jean N'Diaye (born 25 June 1976) is a former professional footballer who played as a defensive midfielder. Born in France, he made 24 appearances for the Senegal national team.

== Club career ==
Born in Paris, N'Diaye played for Bordeaux, who loaned him to Martigues, Belgian First Division's Gent, Toulouse, Lille and Marseille. Whilst at Marseille, he started in the 2004 UEFA Cup Final.

Other than in Belgium, he also had abroad stints with Spain's Levante, helping the team achieve top flight promotion in 2006, and Tenerife. In July 2008, he returned to France, signing with Ligue 2 outfit Reims. On 12 July 2010, he signed for Cannes.

== International career ==
N'Diaye received 17 international caps for Senegal, and participated at the 2002 World Cup. However, he played no minutes for the quarterfinalists.
