= 2003–04 UEFA Cup =

33rd season of Europe's secondary club football tournament organised by UEFA

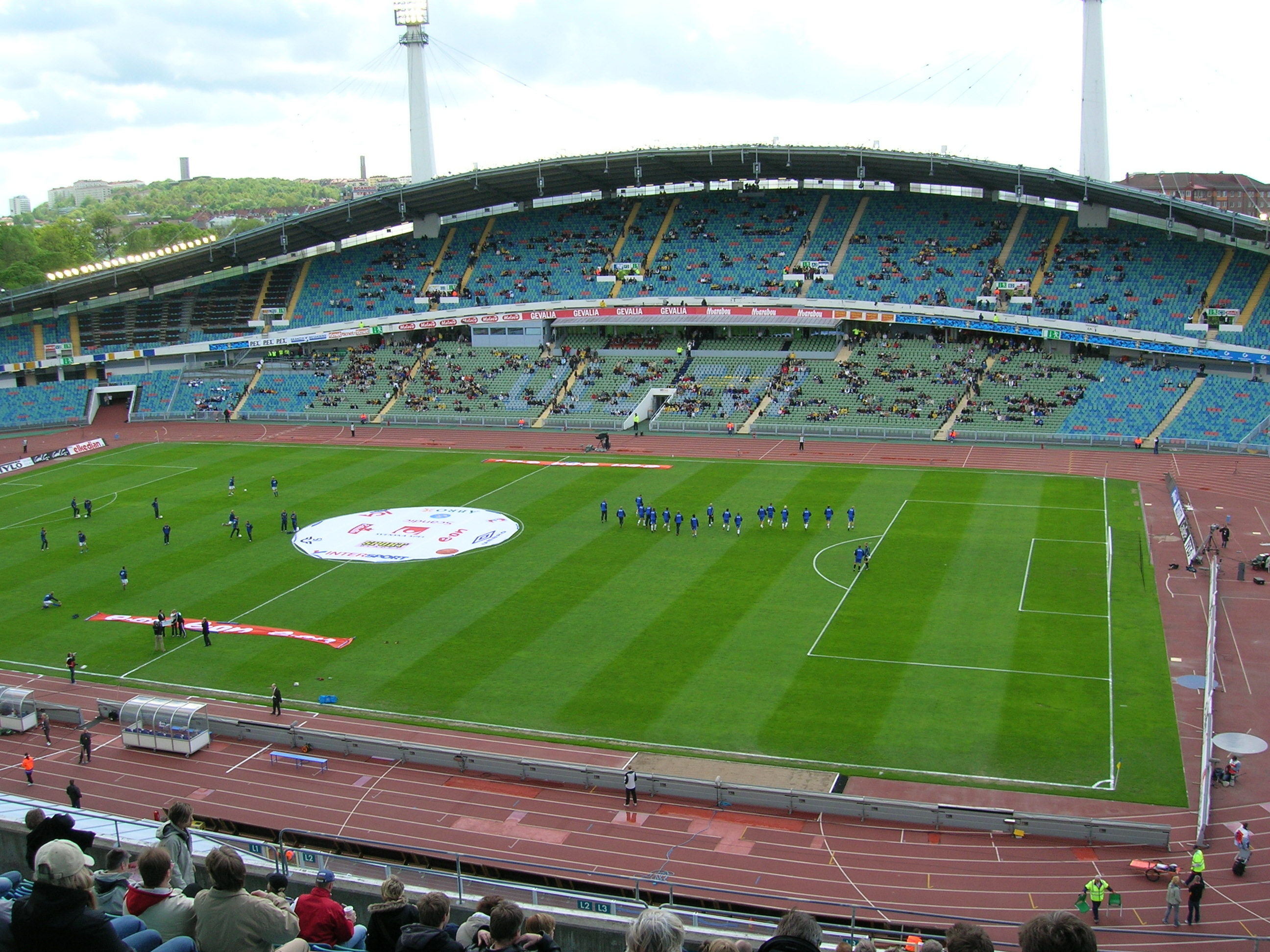
- Ullevi in Gothenburg hosted the final.

Tournament details
- Dates: 12 August 2003 – 19 May 2004
- Teams: 145 (from 1 confederation)

Final positions
- Champions: (Spain) Valencia (1st title)
- Runners-up: (France) Marseille

Tournament statistics
- Matches played: 205
- Goals scored: 464 (2.26 per match)
- Top scorer(s): Sonny Anderson (Villarreal); Mateja Kežman (PSV Eindhoven); Didier Drogba (Marseille); Alan Shearer (Newcastle United); 6 goals

The 2003–04 UEFA Cup was won by Valencia in the final against Marseille. It wrapped up a league and UEFA Cup double for Valencia.

Porto could not defend their title as they automatically qualified for the 2003–04 UEFA Champions League and also went on to win the final for their second European Cup title.

== Association team allocation ==
A total of 145 teams from 51 of 52 UEFA member associations participated in the 2003–04 UEFA Cup (the exception being Azerbaijan which was suspended). The association ranking based on the UEFA country coefficients was used to determine the number of participating teams for each association:

- Associations 1–6 and 16–21 each had three teams qualify.
- Associations 7–8 each had four teams qualify.
- Associations 9–15 and 22–52 (except Azerbaijan, Liechtenstein, Andorra and San Marino) each had two teams qualify.
- Liechtenstein (as they organized only a domestic cup and no domestic league), Andorra and San Marino had only one team that qualified.

Moreover, the following teams also qualified for the competition:

- 24 teams eliminated from the 2003–04 UEFA Champions League were transferred to the UEFA Cup.
- 3 teams advancing from the 2003 UEFA Intertoto Cup were transferred to the UEFA Cup.
- 3 associations had one additional team qualify via the UEFA Respect Fair Play ranking.

=== Association ranking ===
For the 2003–04 UEFA Cup, the associations were allocated places according to their 2002 UEFA country coefficients, which took into account their performance in European competitions from 1997–98 to 2001–02.

Apart from the allocation based on the country coefficients, associations could have additional teams participating in the UEFA Cup, as noted below:

- (UCL) – Additional teams transferred from the UEFA Champions League
- (IC) – Additional teams transferred from the UEFA Intertoto Cup
- (FP) – Additional berth via Fair Play ranking

Association ranking for 2003–04 UEFA Cup

Rank	Association	Coeff.	Teams	Notes
1	Spain	68.467	3	+1 (IC)
2	Italy	58.668	3	+1 (IC) +1 (UCL)
3	England	55.459	3	+1 (FP) +1 (UCL)
4	Germany	52.990	3	+1 (IC) +1 (UCL)
5	France	42.352	3	+1 (FP) +1 (UCL)
6	Greece	36.116	3	+1 (UCL)
7	Netherlands	34.165	4	+1 (UCL)
8	Turkey	28.725	4	+2 (UCL)
9	Portugal	28.249	2	+1 (UCL)
10	Russia	27.291	2	
11	Czech Republic	26.625	2	+1 (UCL)
12	Scotland	26.125	2	+1 (UCL)
13	Ukraine	25.958	2	+1 (UCL)
14	Belgium	25.525	2	+1 (UCL)
15	Austria	23.250	2	+2 (UCL)
16	Switzerland	22.625	3	+1 (UCL)
17	Norway	21.475	3	+1 (UCL)
18	Israel	21.332	3	

Rank	Association	Coeff.	Teams	Notes
19	Croatia	21.041	3	+1 (UCL)
20	Poland	17.500	3	+1 (UCL)
21	Denmark	17.375	3	+1 (FP) +1 (UCL)
22	Sweden	17.241	2	
23	Serbia and Montenegro	16.331	2	
24	Slovakia	15.665	2	+1 (UCL)
25	Bulgaria	15.165	2	+1 (UCL)
26	Romania	13.916	2	
27	Hungary	13.749	2	+1 (UCL)
28	Slovenia	11.832	2	
29	Cyprus	9.332	2	
30	Finland	8.041	2	
31	Latvia	7.165	2	
32	Georgia	6.999	2	
33	Moldova	5.165	2	
34	Iceland	4.832	2	
35	Belarus	4.083	2	

Rank	Association	Coeff.	Teams	Notes
36	Lithuania	3.831	2	
37	Republic of Ireland	3.331	2	
38	Macedonia	2.997	2	+1 (UCL)
39	Malta	2.498	2	
40	Wales	1.832	2	
41	Estonia	1.665	2	
42	Bosnia and Herzegovina	1.333	2	
43	Armenia	1.332	2	
44	Northern Ireland	1.331	2	
45	Albania	1.165	2	
46	Faroe Islands	1.165	2	
47	Azerbaijan	1.165	0	
48	Liechtenstein	1.000	1	
49	Luxembourg	0.832	2	
50	Andorra	0.000	1	
51	San Marino	0.000	1	
52	Kazakhstan	0.000	2	

=== Distribution ===
The following was the access list for this season.

Access list for 2003–04 UEFA Cup
Round	Teams entering in this round	Teams advancing from the previous round	Teams transferred from Champions League or Intertoto Cup
Qualifying round (82 teams)	2 domestic league champions from Andorra and San Marino; 31 domestic cup winners from associations 19–52 (except Azerbaijan, Andorra and San Marino); 33 domestic league runners-up from associations 16–52 (except Azerbaijan, Liechtenstein, Andorra and San Marino); 13 domestic league third-placed teams from associations 9–21; 3 teams which qualified via Fair Play ranking		
First round (96 teams)	18 domestic cup winners from associations 1–18; 2 domestic league third-placed teams from associations 7–8; 5 domestic league fourth-placed teams from associations 4–8; 8 domestic league fifth-placed teams from associations 1–8 (league cup winners for France); 3 domestic league sixth-placed teams from associations 1–3 (league cup winners for England)	41 winners from qualifying round	16 losers from Champions League third qualifying round; 3 winners from UEFA Intertoto Cup finals
Second round (48 teams)		48 winners from first round	
Third round (32 teams)		24 winners from first round	8 group third-placed teams from Champions League group stage

Due to the UEFA Cup title holder (Porto) qualifying for the Champions League via their domestic league, the following changes to the access list were made:

- The cup winners of association 15 and 16 (Austria and Switzerland) entered the UEFA Cup first round instead of the qualifying round.

Due to the suspension of Azerbaijan, the following changes to the access list were made:

- The cup winners of association 17 and 18 (Norway and Israel) entered the UEFA Cup first round instead of the qualifying round.

=== Teams ===
The labels in the parentheses show how each team qualified for the place of its starting round:

- CW: Cup winners
- CR: Cup runners-up
- LC: League Cup winners
- Nth: League position
- PO: End-of-season European competition play-offs (winners or position)
- IC: Intertoto Cup
- FP: Fair play
- CL: Relegated from the Champions League
  - GS: Third-placed teams from the group stage
  - Q3: Losers from the third qualifying round

Third round
(Italy) Internazionale (CL GS)	(Greece) Panathinaikos (CL GS)	(Turkey) Beşiktaş (CL GS)	(Scotland) Celtic (CL GS)
(France) Marseille (CL GS)	(Netherlands) PSV Eindhoven (CL GS)	(Turkey) Galatasaray (CL GS)	(Belgium) Club Brugge (CL GS)
First round
(Spain) Mallorca (CW)	(France) Sochaux (5th)	(Czech Republic) Teplice (CW)	(Austria) GAK (CL Q3)
(Spain) Valencia (5th)	(Greece) PAOK (CW)	(Scotland) Heart of Midlothian (3rd)	(Switzerland) Grasshopper (CL Q3)
(Spain) Barcelona (6th)	(Greece) Panionios (5th)	(Ukraine) Metalurh Donetsk (3rd)	(Norway) Rosenborg (CL Q3)
(Italy) Parma (5th)	(Greece) Aris (6th)	(Belgium) La Louvière (CW)	(Croatia) Dinamo Zagreb (CL Q3)
(Italy) Udinese (6th)	(Netherlands) Utrecht (CW)	(Austria) Wüstenrot Salzburg (3rd)	(Poland) Wisła Kraków (CL Q3)
(Italy) Roma (CR)	(Netherlands) Feyenoord (3rd)	(Switzerland) Basel (CW)	(Denmark) Copenhagen (CL Q3)
(England) Liverpool (5th)	(Netherlands) NAC Breda (4th)	(Norway) Vålerenga (CW)	(Slovakia) Žilina (CL Q3)
(England) Blackburn Rovers (6th)	(Netherlands) NEC (5th)	(Israel) Hapoel Ramat Gan (CW)	(Bulgaria) CSKA Sofia (CL Q3)
(England) Southampton (CR)	(Turkey) Trabzonspor (CW)	(England) Newcastle United (CL Q3)	(Hungary) MTK Hungária (CL Q3)
(Germany) Hamburger SV (4th)	(Turkey) Gençlerbirliği (3rd)	(Germany) Borussia Dortmund (CL Q3)	(North Macedonia) Vardar (CL Q3)
(Germany) Hertha BSC (5th)	(Turkey) Gaziantepspor (4th)	(Portugal) Benfica (CL Q3)	(Spain) Villarreal (IC)
(Germany) 1. FC Kaiserslautern (CR)	(Turkey) Malatyaspor (5th)	(Czech Republic) Slavia Prague (CL Q3)	(Italy) Perugia (IC)
(France) Auxerre (CW)	(Portugal) Sporting CP (3rd)	(Ukraine) Shakhtar Donetsk (CL Q3)	(Germany) Schalke 04 (IC)
(France) Bordeaux (4th)	(Russia) Spartak Moscow (CW)	Austria Wien (CL Q3)	
Qualifying round
(Portugal) União de Leiria (CR)	(Denmark) Odense (3rd)	(Georgia (country)) Torpedo Kutaisi (2nd)	(Bosnia and Herzegovina) Željezničar (CW)
(Russia) Torpedo Moscow (4th)	(Sweden) Malmö FF (2nd)	(Georgia (country)) Sioni Bolnisi (CR)	(Bosnia and Herzegovina) Sarajevo (3rd)
(Czech Republic) Viktoria Žižkov (3rd)	(Sweden) AIK (CR)	(Moldova) Zimbru Chișinău (CW)	(Armenia) Shirak (2nd)
(Scotland) Dundee (CR)	(Serbia and Montenegro) Sartid (CW)	(Moldova) Nistru Otaci (3rd)	(Armenia) Banants (3rd)
(Ukraine) Dnipro Dnipropetrovsk (4th)	(Serbia and Montenegro) Red Star Belgrade (2nd)	(Iceland) Fylkir (CW)	(Northern Ireland) Coleraine (CW)
(Belgium) Lokeren (3rd)	(Slovakia) Matador Púchov (CW)	(Iceland) Grindavík (3rd)	(Northern Ireland) Portadown (2nd)
(Austria) Kärnten (CR)	(Slovakia) Artmedia Petržalka (2nd)	(Belarus) Dinamo Minsk (CW)	(Albania) Dinamo Tirana (CW)
(Switzerland) Neuchâtel Xamax (3rd)	(Bulgaria) Levski Sofia (CW)	(Belarus) Neman Grodno (2nd)	(Albania) Vllaznia (2nd)
(Switzerland) Young Boys (4th)	(Bulgaria) Litex Lovech (3rd)	(Lithuania) Atlantas (CW)	(Faroe Islands) NSÍ (CW)
(Norway) Molde (2nd)	(Romania) Dinamo București (CW)	(Lithuania) Ekranas (3rd)	(Faroe Islands) KÍ (3rd)
(Norway) Lyn (3rd)	(Romania) Steaua București (2nd)	(Republic of Ireland) Derry City (CW)	(Liechtenstein) Vaduz (CW)
(Israel) Maccabi Haifa (2nd)	(Hungary) Ferencváros (CW)	(Republic of Ireland) Shelbourne (2nd)	(Luxembourg) F91 Dudelange (2nd)
(Israel) Hapoel Tel Aviv (3rd)	(Hungary) Debrecen (3rd)	(North Macedonia) Cementarnica 55 (CW)	(Luxembourg) Etzella Ettelbruck (CR)
(Croatia) Hajduk Split (CW)	(Slovenia) Olimpija Ljubljana (CW)	(North Macedonia) Belasica (2nd)	(Andorra) FC Santa Coloma (1st)
(Croatia) Varteks (3rd)	(Slovenia) Publikum (2nd)	(Malta) Birkirkara (CW)	(San Marino) Domagnano (1st)
(Croatia) Kamen Ingrad (4th)	(Cyprus) Anorthosis Famagusta (CW)	(Malta) Valletta (3rd)	(Kazakhstan) Zhenis (CW)
(Poland) Groclin Grodzisk Wielkopolski (2nd)	(Cyprus) APOEL (3rd)	(Wales) Total Network Solutions (2nd)	(Kazakhstan) Atyrau (2nd)
(Poland) GKS Katowice (3rd)	(Finland) Haka (CW)	(Wales) Cwmbrân Town (CR)	(England) Manchester City (FP)
(Poland) Wisła Płock (CR)	(Finland) MYPA (2nd)	(Estonia) TVMK (CW)	(France) Lens (FP)
(Denmark) Brøndby (CW)	(Latvia) Ventspils (2nd)	(Estonia) Levadia Maardu (2nd)	(Denmark) Esbjerg (FP)
(Denmark) Nordsjælland (2nd)	(Latvia) Liepājas Metalurgs (CR)		

Notes

1. Azerbaijan (AZE): Clubs from Azerbaijan were not admitted to UEFA competitions as no domestic competitions took place in 2002–03 season and AFFA was suspended by UEFA as a result of ongoing conflict between the clubs and federation.

== Round and draw dates ==
The schedule of the competition was as follows.

Schedule for 2003–04 UEFA Cup
Round	Draw date	First leg	Second leg
Qualifying round	20 June 2003	14 August 2003	28 August 2003
First round	29 August 2003	24 September 2003	15 October 2003
Second round	17 October 2003	6 November 2003	27 November 2003
Third round	12 December 2003	26 February 2004	3 March 2004
Fourth round	4 March 2004	11 March 2004	25 March 2004
Quarter-finals	4 March 2004	8 April 2004	14 April 2004
Semi-finals	4 March 2004	22 April 2004	6 May 2004
Final	4 March 2004	19 May 2004 at Ullevi, Gothenburg	

== Qualifying round ==
The first legs were played on 12, 13 and 14 August, and the second legs were played on 27 and 28 August 2003.

Team 1	Agg.	Team 2	1st leg	2nd leg
AIK (Sweden)	1–0	(Iceland) Fylkir	1–0	0–0
Vllaznia (Albania)	0–6	(Scotland) Dundee	0–2	0–4
Levadia Maardu (Estonia)	3–6	(Croatia) Varteks	1–3	2–3
Esbjerg (Denmark)	9–1	(Andorra) FC Santa Coloma	5–0	4–1
Željezničar (Bosnia and Herzegovina)	4–1	(Cyprus) Anorthosis Famagusta	1–0	3–1
Hapoel Tel Aviv (Israel)	3–2	(Armenia) Banants	1–1	2–1
Brøndby (Denmark)	5–0	(Belarus) Dinamo Minsk	3–0	2–0
Malmö FF (Sweden)	6–0	(Northern Ireland) Portadown	4–0	2–0
Dinamo București (Romania)	6–3	(Latvia) Liepājas Metalurgs	5–2	1–1
Valletta (Malta)	0–4	(Switzerland) Neuchâtel Xamax	0–2	0–2
Kärnten (Austria)	3–2	(Iceland) Grindavík	2–1	1–1
Viktoria Žižkov (Czech Republic)	6–1	(Kazakhstan) Zhenis	3–0	3–1
Sarajevo (Bosnia and Herzegovina)	1–4	(Serbia and Montenegro) Sartid	1–1	0–3
APOEL (Cyprus)	5–1	(Republic of Ireland) Derry City	2–1	3–0
Litex Lovech (Bulgaria)	0–2	(Moldova) Zimbru Chișinău	0–0	0–2
Neman Grodno (Belarus)	1–1 (a)	(Romania) Steaua București	1–1	0–0
Etzella Ettelbruck (Luxembourg)	1–9	(Croatia) Kamen Ingrad	1–2	0–7
Manchester City (England)	7–0	(Wales) Total Network Solutions	5–0	2–0
Molde (Norway)	6–0	(Faroe Islands) KÍ	2–0	4–0
Odense (Denmark)	4–1	(Estonia) TVMK	1–1	3–0
Ventspils (Latvia)	3–3 (a)	(Poland) Wisła Płock	1–1	2–2
MYPA (Finland)	5–4	(Switzerland) Young Boys	3–2	2–2
Vaduz (Liechtenstein)	0–2	(Ukraine) Dnipro Dnipropetrovsk	0–1	0–1
Coleraine (Northern Ireland)	2–6	(Portugal) União de Leiria	2–1	0–5
Groclin Grodzisk Wielkopolski (Poland)	6–1	(Lithuania) Atlantas	2–0	4–1
Dinamo Tirana (Albania)	1–7	(Belgium) Lokeren	0–4	1–3
Cwmbrân Town (Wales)	0–6	(Israel) Maccabi Haifa	0–3	0–3
Publikum (Slovenia)	12–2	(North Macedonia) Belasica	7–2	5–0
Cementarnica 55 (North Macedonia)	1–1 (a)	(Poland) GKS Katowice	0–0	1–1
Matador Púchov (Slovakia)	6–0	(Georgia (country)) Sioni Bolnisi	3–0	3–0
Red Star Belgrade (Serbia and Montenegro)	8–2	(Moldova) Nistru Otaci	5–0	3–2
Ekranas (Lithuania)	2–3	(Hungary) Debrecen	1–1	1–2 (a.e.t.)
Birkirkara (Malta)	0–6	(Hungary) Ferencváros	0–5	0–1
Haka (Finland)	2–2 (a)	(Croatia) Hajduk Split	2–1	0–1
Torpedo Moscow (Russia)	9–0	(San Marino) Domagnano	5–0	4–0
Atyrau (Kazakhstan)	1–6	(Bulgaria) Levski Sofia	1–4	0–2
Olimpija Ljubljana (Slovenia)	4–2	(Republic of Ireland) Shelbourne	1–0	3–2
Lens (France)	5–0	(Georgia (country)) Torpedo Kutaisi	3–0	2–0
Nordsjælland (Denmark)	6–0	(Armenia) Shirak	4–0	2–0
Artmedia Petržalka (Slovakia)	2–0	(Luxembourg) F91 Dudelange	1–0	1–0
NSÍ (Faroe Islands)	1–9	(Norway) Lyn	1–3	0–6

== First round ==
The first round featured the 41 winners of the qualifying round, joined by 36 directly qualified teams, the 16 losers of the Champions League third qualifying round and the 3 winners for the Intertoto Cup. The first legs were played on 24 and 25 September, and the second legs were played on 15 and 16 October 2003.

Team 1	Agg.	Team 2	1st leg	2nd leg
AIK (Sweden)	0–2	(Spain) Valencia	0–1	0–1
Dinamo București (Romania)	5–2	(Ukraine) Shakhtar Donetsk	2–0	3–2
Maccabi Haifa (Israel)	4–3	(Slovenia) Publikum	2–1	2–2
Dundee (Scotland)	1–3	(Italy) Perugia	1–2	0–1
Cementarnica 55 (North Macedonia)	0–6	(France) Lens	0–1	0–5
Newcastle United (England)	6–0	(Netherlands) NAC Breda	5–0	1–0
Panionios (Greece)	3–1	(Denmark) Nordsjælland	2–1	1–0
Heart of Midlothian (Scotland)	2–0	(Bosnia and Herzegovina) Željezničar	2–0	0–0
Gençlerbirliği (Turkey)	4–2	(England) Blackburn Rovers	3–1	1–1
Matador Púchov (Slovakia)	1–9	(Spain) Barcelona	1–1	0–8
Dinamo Zagreb (Croatia)	3–1	(Hungary) MTK Hungária	3–1	0–0
Hapoel Ramat Gan (Israel)	0–5	(Bulgaria) Levski Sofia	0–1	0–4
Sartid (Serbia and Montenegro)	2–4	(Czech Republic) Slavia Prague	1–2	1–2
Villarreal (Spain)	3–2	(Turkey) Trabzonspor	0–0	3–2
Grasshopper (Switzerland)	1–1 (a)	(Croatia) Hajduk Split	1–1	0–0
Hertha BSC (Germany)	0–1	(Poland) Groclin Grodzisk Wielkopolski	0–0	0–1
Vålerenga (Norway)	1–1 (a)	(Austria) GAK	0–0	1–1
Zimbru Chișinău (Moldova)	2–3	(Greece) Aris	1–1	1–2
Varteks (Croatia)	3–6	(Hungary) Debrecen	1–3	2–3
União de Leiria (Portugal)	2–3	(Norway) Molde	1–0	1–3
Austria Wien	1–3	(Germany) Borussia Dortmund	1–2	0–1
Auxerre (France)	2–0	(Switzerland) Neuchâtel Xamax	1–0	1–0
Ventspils (Latvia)	1–10	(Norway) Rosenborg	1–4	0–6
Gaziantepspor (Turkey)	1–0	(Israel) Hapoel Tel Aviv	1–0	0–0
Odense (Denmark)	5–6	(Serbia and Montenegro) Red Star Belgrade	2–2	3–4
Sporting CP (Portugal)	3–0	(Sweden) Malmö FF	2–0	1–0
Utrecht (Netherlands)	6–0	(Slovakia) Žilina	2–0	4–0
Metalurh Donetsk (Ukraine)	1–4	(Italy) Parma	1–1	0–3
MYPA (Finland)	0–3	(France) Sochaux	0–1	0–2
Southampton (England)	1–2	(Romania) Steaua București	1–1	0–1
Roma (Italy)	5–1	(North Macedonia) Vardar	4–0	1–1
Manchester City (England)	4–2	(Belgium) Lokeren	3–2	1–0
Spartak Moscow (Russia)	3–1	(Denmark) Esbjerg	2–0	1–1
CSKA Sofia (Bulgaria)	2–2 (2–3 p)	(Russia) Torpedo Moscow	1–1	1–1 (a.e.t.)
Ferencváros (Hungary)	2–2 (2–3 p)	(Denmark) Copenhagen	1–1	1–1 (a.e.t.)
APOEL (Cyprus)	3–6	(Spain) Mallorca	1–2	2–4
Olimpija Ljubljana (Slovenia)	1–4	(England) Liverpool	1–1	0–3
PAOK (Greece)	3–1	(Norway) Lyn	0–1	3–0
Malatyaspor (Turkey)	2–3	(Switzerland) Basel	0–2	2–1 (a.e.t.)
La Louvière (Belgium)	1–2	(Portugal) Benfica	1–1	0–1
Wüstenrot Salzburg (Austria)	2–2 (a)	(Italy) Udinese	0–1	2–1
Brøndby (Denmark)	2–0	(Czech Republic) Viktoria Žižkov	1–0	1–0
1. FC Kaiserslautern (Germany)	1–3	(Czech Republic) Teplice	1–2	0–1
Hamburger SV (Germany)	2–4	(Ukraine) Dnipro Dnipropetrovsk	2–1	0–3
Bordeaux (France)	3–2	(Slovakia) Artmedia Petržalka	2–1	1–1
Wisła Kraków (Poland)	4–2	(Netherlands) NEC	2–1	2–1
Kamen Ingrad (Croatia)	0–1	(Germany) Schalke 04	0–0	0–1
Feyenoord (Netherlands)	3–1	(Austria) Kärnten	2–1	1–0

== Second round ==
The second round featured the 48 winners of the first round. The first legs were played on 29 October and 6 November, and the second legs were played on 27 November and 11 December 2003.

Team 1	Agg.	Team 2	1st leg	2nd leg
Rosenborg (Norway)	1–0	(Serbia and Montenegro) Red Star Belgrade	0–0	1–0
Dinamo Zagreb (Croatia)	1–3	(Ukraine) Dnipro Dnipropetrovsk	0–2	1–1
Borussia Dortmund (Germany)	2–6	(France) Sochaux	2–2	0–4
Manchester City (England)	1–1 (a)	(Poland) Groclin Grodzisk Wielkopolski	1–1	0–0
Benfica (Portugal)	5–1	(Norway) Molde	3–1	2–0
Slavia Prague (Czech Republic)	2–2 (a)	(Bulgaria) Levski Sofia	2–2	0–0
Spartak Moscow (Russia)	5–3	(Romania) Dinamo București	4–0	1–3
Gaziantepspor (Turkey)	6–1	(France) Lens	3–0	3–1
Schalke 04 (Germany)	3–3 (1–3 p)	(Denmark) Brøndby	2–1	1–2 (a.e.t.)
Perugia (Italy)	3–1	(Greece) Aris	2–0	1–1
Utrecht (Netherlands)	0–4	(France) Auxerre	0–0	0–4
Steaua București (Romania)	1–2	(England) Liverpool	1–1	0–1
Vålerenga (Norway)	0–0 (4–3 p)	(Poland) Wisła Kraków	0–0	0–0 (a.e.t.)
PAOK (Greece)	1–1 (a)	(Hungary) Debrecen	1–1	0–0
Copenhagen (Denmark)	2–3	(Spain) Mallorca	1–2	1–1
Basel (Switzerland)	2–4	(England) Newcastle United	2–3	0–1
Roma (Italy)	2–1	(Croatia) Hajduk Split	1–0	1–1
Gençlerbirliği (Turkey)	4–1	(Portugal) Sporting CP	1–1	3–0
Villarreal (Spain)	2–1	(Russia) Torpedo Moscow	2–0	0–1
Feyenoord (Netherlands)	1–3	(Czech Republic) Teplice	0–2	1–1
Bordeaux (France)	2–1	(Scotland) Heart of Midlothian	0–1	2–0
Panionios (Greece)	0–5	(Spain) Barcelona	0–3	0–2
Wüstenrot Salzburg (Austria)	0–9	(Italy) Parma	0–4	0–5
Valencia (Spain)	4–0	(Israel) Maccabi Haifa	0–0	4–0

== Final phase ==
In the final phase, teams played against each other over two legs on a home-and-away basis, except for the one-match final. The mechanism of the draws for each round was as follows:

- In the draws for the third and fourth rounds, teams were seeded and divided into groups containing an equal number of seeded and unseeded teams. In each group, the seeded teams were drawn against the unseeded teams, with the first team drawn hosting the first leg. Teams from the same association could not be drawn against each other.
- In the draws for the quarter-finals onwards, there were no seedings and teams from the same association could be drawn against each other.

=== Bracket ===
Third round
(Scotland) Celtic	3	0	3
(Czech Republic) Teplice	0	1	1
(Denmark) Brøndby	0	1	1
(Spain) Barcelona	1	2	3
(Turkey) Galatasaray	2	0	2
(Spain) Villarreal	2	3	5
(Turkey) Gaziantepspor	1	0	1
(Italy) Roma	0	2	2
(Poland) Groclin Grodzisk Wielkopolski	0	1	1
(France) Bordeaux	1	4	5
(Belgium) Club Brugge	1	0	1
(Hungary) Debrecen	0	0	0
(Italy) Parma	0	0	0
(Turkey) Gençlerbirliği	1	3	4
(Spain) Valencia	3	2	5
(Turkey) Beşiktaş	2	0	2
(France) Auxerre	0	1	1
(Greece) Panathinaikos	0	0	0
(Italy) Perugia	0	1	1
(Netherlands) PSV Eindhoven	0	3	3
(Norway) Vålerenga	1	1	2
(England) Newcastle United	1	3	4
(Russia) Spartak Moscow	0	1	1
(Spain) Mallorca	3	0	3
(England) Liverpool	2	4	6
(Bulgaria) Levski Sofia	0	2	2
(France) Marseille	1	0	1
(Ukraine) Dnipro Dnipropetrovsk	0	0	0
(Portugal) Benfica (a)	1	1	2
(Norway) Rosenborg	0	2	2
(France) Sochaux	2	0	2
(Italy) Internazionale (a)	2	0	2

Fourth round
(Scotland) Celtic	1	0	1
(Spain) Barcelona	0	0	0
(Spain) Villarreal	2	1	3
(Italy) Roma	0	2	2
(France) Bordeaux	3	1	4
(Belgium) Club Brugge	1	0	1
(Turkey) Gençlerbirliği	1	0	1
(Spain) Valencia (s.g.)	0	2	2
(France) Auxerre	1	0	1
(Netherlands) PSV Eindhoven	1	3	4
(England) Newcastle United	4	3	7
(Spain) Mallorca	1	0	1
(England) Liverpool	1	1	2
(France) Marseille	1	2	3
(Portugal) Benfica	0	3	3
(Italy) Internazionale	0	4	4

Quarter-finals
(Scotland) Celtic	1	0	1
(Spain) Villarreal	1	2	3
(France) Bordeaux	1	1	2
(Spain) Valencia	2	2	4
(Netherlands) PSV Eindhoven	1	1	2
(England) Newcastle United	1	2	3
(France) Marseille	1	1	2
(Italy) Internazionale	0	0	0

Semi-finals
(Spain) Villarreal	0	0	0
(Spain) Valencia	0	1	1
(England) Newcastle United	0	0	0
(France) Marseille	0	2	2

Final
19 May – Gothenburg
(Spain) Valencia	2
(France) Marseille	0

=== Third round ===
The draw for the third round was held on 12 December 2003, 13:00 CET. The first legs were played on 26 February, and the second legs were played on 3 March 2004.

Team 1	Agg.	Team 2	1st leg	2nd leg
Brøndby (Denmark)	1–3	(Spain) Barcelona	0–1	1–2
Parma (Italy)	0–4	(Turkey) Gençlerbirliği	0–1	0–3
Benfica (Portugal)	2–2 (a)	(Norway) Rosenborg	1–0	1–2
Marseille (France)	1–0	(Ukraine) Dnipro Dnipropetrovsk	1–0	0–0
Celtic (Scotland)	3–1	(Czech Republic) Teplice	3–0	0–1
Perugia (Italy)	1–3	(Netherlands) PSV Eindhoven	0–0	1–3
Groclin Grodzisk Wielkopolski (Poland)	1–5	(France) Bordeaux	0–1	1–4
Valencia (Spain)	5–2	(Turkey) Beşiktaş	3–2	2–0
Galatasaray (Turkey)	2–5	(Spain) Villarreal	2–2	0–3
Club Brugge (Belgium)	1–0	(Hungary) Debrecen	1–0	0–0
Sochaux (France)	2–2 (a)	(Italy) Internazionale	2–2	0–0
Liverpool (England)	6–2	(Bulgaria) Levski Sofia	2–0	4–2
Spartak Moscow (Russia)	1–3	(Spain) Mallorca	0–3	1–0
Gaziantepspor (Turkey)	1–2	(Italy) Roma	1–0	0–2
Auxerre (France)	1–0	(Greece) Panathinaikos	0–0	1–0
Vålerenga (Norway)	2–4	(England) Newcastle United	1–1	1–3

=== Fourth round ===
The draw for the fourth round was held on 4 March 2004, 14:00 CET. The first legs were played on 11 March, and the second legs were played on 25 March 2004.

Team 1	Agg.	Team 2	1st leg	2nd leg
Celtic (Scotland)	1–0	(Spain) Barcelona	1–0	0–0
Gençlerbirliği (Turkey)	1–2	(Spain) Valencia	1–0	0–2 (a.e.t.)
Bordeaux (France)	4–1	(Belgium) Club Brugge	3–1	1–0
Newcastle United (England)	7–1	(Spain) Mallorca	4–1	3–0
Auxerre (France)	1–4	(Netherlands) PSV Eindhoven	1–1	0–3
Benfica (Portugal)	3–4	(Italy) Internazionale	0–0	3–4
Liverpool (England)	2–3	(France) Marseille	1–1	1–2
Villarreal (Spain)	3–2	(Italy) Roma	2–0	1–2

=== Quarter-finals ===
The draw for the quarter-finals was held on 4 March 2004, 14:00 CET, immediately after the fourth round draw. The first legs were played on 8 April, and the second legs were played on 14 April 2004.

Team 1	Agg.	Team 2	1st leg	2nd leg
Bordeaux (France)	2–4	(Spain) Valencia	1–2	1–2
Marseille (France)	2–0	(Italy) Internazionale	1–0	1–0
Celtic (Scotland)	1–3	(Spain) Villarreal	1–1	0–2
PSV Eindhoven (Netherlands)	2–3	(England) Newcastle United	1–1	1–2

=== Semi-finals ===
The draw for the semi-finals was held on 4 March 2004, 14:00 CET, immediately after the fourth round and quarter-final draws. The first legs were played on 22 April, and the second legs were played on 6 May 2004.

Team 1	Agg.	Team 2	1st leg	2nd leg
Newcastle United (England)	0–2	(France) Marseille	0–0	0–2
Villarreal (Spain)	0–1	(Spain) Valencia	0–0	0–1

=== Final ===
The final was played on 19 May 2004 at the Ullevi in Gothenburg, Sweden. A draw was held on 4 March 2004 (after the fourth round, quarter-final and semi-final draws) to determine the "home" team for administrative purposes.

19 May 2004
20:45 UTC+2

Valencia (Spain)	2–0	(France) Marseille
Vicente 45+3' (pen.); Mista 58'	Report

Ullevi, Gothenburg
Attendance: 39,000
Referee: Pierluigi Collina (Italy)

== Top goalscorers ==
Rank	Name	Team	Goals	Minutes played
1	(Brazil) Sonny Anderson	(Spain) Villarreal	6	967
1	(Serbia and Montenegro) Mateja Kežman	(Netherlands) PSV Eindhoven	6	540
1	(Ivory Coast) Didier Drogba	(France) Marseille	6	635
1	(England) Alan Shearer	(England) Newcastle United	6	900
5	(Portugal) Nuno Gomes	(Portugal) Benfica	5	379
5	(Wales) Craig Bellamy	(England) Newcastle United	5	502
5	(Spain) Mista	(Spain) Valencia	5	581
5	(Spain) Albert Riera	(France) Bordeaux	5	769

== See also ==
- 2003–04 UEFA Champions League
- 2003 UEFA Intertoto Cup
