= Mista (footballer) =

Spanish footballer (born 1978)

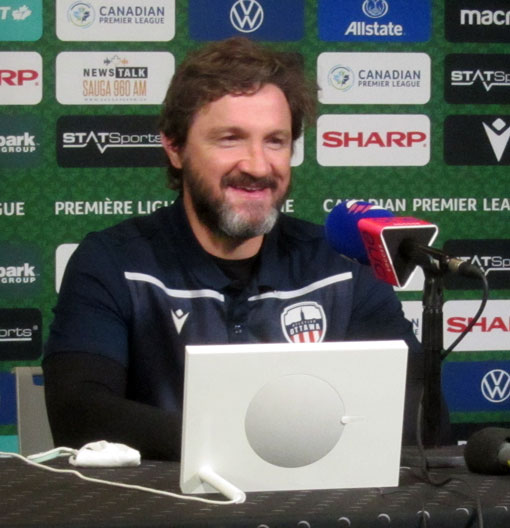
- Mista in 2021

Personal information
- Full name: Miguel Ángel Ferrer Martínez
- Date of birth: 12 November 1978 (age 48)
- Place of birth: Caravaca de la Cruz, Spain
- Height: 1.84 m (6 ft 1/2 in)
- Position: Striker

Youth career
- 1990–1994: Peña Madridista Caravaca Cruz
- 1994–1995: Caravaca Promesas
- 1995–1996: Real Madrid

Senior career*
Years	Team	Apps	(Gls)
1996–1997	Real Madrid C	29	(9)
1997–1998	Real Madrid B	43	(23)
1999–2001	Tenerife	84	(22)
2001–2006	Valencia	144	(40)
2006–2008	Atlético Madrid	35	(3)
2008–2010	Deportivo La Coruña	26	(2)
2010	Toronto FC	9	(0)
Total		370	(99)

International career
1995	Spain U17	3	(1)
1996–1997	Spain U18	10	(1)
1999	Spain U21	1	(0)
2005	Spain	2	(0)

Managerial career
- 2020–2021: Atlético Ottawa
- * Club domestic league appearances and goals

Miguel Ángel Ferrer Martínez (born 12 November 1978), known as Mista, is a Spanish former professional footballer who played as a striker.

An unsuccessful Real Madrid youth graduate, he would make a name for himself with Valencia, helping the club to win four major titles during his five-year spell and scoring 48 goals in 218 La Liga games over ten seasons, in representation of four teams.

Mista was a Spain international in the 2000s. He later worked briefly as a coach with Atlético Ottawa.

== Club career ==
=== Spain ===
Born in Caravaca de la Cruz, Region of Murcia, Mista was a protégé of Rafael Benítez. The pair worked together at tenerife and Valencia.

At Tenerife, Mista – along with Curro Torres and Luis García – was a key member of the team that promoted to La Liga in 2001. He subsequently signed for Valencia, and was a prominent member of the successful sides that won two league titles and the 2003–04 UEFA Cup, where he scored the second goal in the 2–0 win against Marseille. On 21 March 2004, he netted a hat-trick for the eventual champions in a 5–1 home victory over Mallorca, but his goal rate decreased drastically after the 2004–05 campaign.

In July 2006, Mista joined Atlético Madrid, playing 29 games in his first season but almost absolutely no part in the following. In July 2008, the free agent moved to fellow top-division club Deportivo de La Coruña on a three-year contract, scoring in his competitive debut by netting the first in a 2–1 defeat of Real Madrid on 31 August; constantly troubled by injuries and a loss of form, his second league goal came more than a year later (7 November 2009) in a 2–0 away victory against Getafe.

=== Toronto FC ===
After only two official goals for Deportivo in two seasons, Mista signed with Toronto FC of Major League Soccer on 6 July 2010, in a deal running until the end of the season. He first took the field in a friendly against Bolton Wanderers on the 21st, and made his competitive debut in a 1–1 draw against FC Dallas also at BMO Field three days later. His only goal came on 17 August, in a 2–1 home win over Cruz Azul in the CONCACAF Champions League.

On 24 November 2010, in the 2010 MLS Expansion Draft, the 32-year-old Mista was waived. He announced his retirement on 14 August of the following year.

== International career ==
Mista made his debut with Spain on 26 March 2005, in a 3–0 friendly win against China in Salamanca. He added another cap seven months later, in a 6–0 away thrashing of San Marino for the 2006 FIFA World Cup qualifiers.

== Coaching career ==
Mista began working as a coach at youth level, first with Valencia then with Madrid-based Rayo Vallecano. On 11 February 2020, he was announced as the first manager of Canadian Premier League side Atlético Ottawa at the club's official launch event. After the COVID-19 pandemic, he finally made his managerial debut on 15 August in a 2–2 draw with York9 at the neutral Prince Edward Island; the team from the capital finished the season in seventh place, one above last.

After a last-place finish in the 2021 campaign, Mista announced that he would not be returning.

== Managerial statistics ==
As of 31 December 2021

Team	From	To	Record								Ref.
Team	From	To	M	W	D	L	GF	GA	GD	Win %	Ref.
Atlético Ottawa	29 January 2020	28 December 2021	36	8	10	18	39	62	−23	22.22	
Total			36	8	10	18	39	62	−23	22.22	—

== Honours ==
Valencia

- La Liga: 2001–02, 2003–04
- UEFA Cup: 2003–04
- UEFA Super Cup: 2004

Atlético Madrid

- UEFA Intertoto Cup: 2007

Deportivo

- UEFA Intertoto Cup: 2008

Toronto FC

- Canadian Championship: 2010
