= Grzegorz Gilewski =

Polish football referee (born 1973)

- Born: 24 February 1973 (age 53); Radom, Poland

Domestic
- Years: League
- 1998–2009: Polish Football Association

International
- Years: League
- 2001–2009: UEFA
- 2004–2009: FIFA

Grzegorz Gilewski (born 24 February 1973) is a Polish former referee. Gilewski started his professional career in 1998 with the Polish Football Association. He started his international career as a referee for UEFA in 2001, overseeing matches in both Intertoto Cup and Europa League. Three year later Gilewski took his first match for FIFA, working World Cup qualifying.

== Bribery scandal ==
In October 2008, FIFA announced Gilewski was on the list of prospective referees for the 2010 FIFA World Cup. On 9 November 2008, Gilewski was detained by CBA in an investigation related to match-fixing in Polish football. He was charged the next day with three crimes: match-fixing, accepting bribes worth 120,000 PLN (ca. 30,000 EUR) and participation in an organised criminal group.
