= Manukyan =

Manukyan, Manoukian, Manoukyan and Manukian (Armenian: Մանուկյան) and Western Armenian alternative transliterations Manougian, Manuguian , Manoogian and Manookian (Western Armenian: Մանուկեան) is an Armenian surname. It is derived from the Armenian given name Manuk, Manug, Manoug (Armenian: Մանուկ) meaning a child and the addition of yan/ian for a surname.

Manukyan and its alternatives can refer to the following people:

== Manukian ==
- Aram Manukian (1879–1919), also Aram of Van and Sarkis Hovanessian, an Armenian revolutionary, politician and military commander, a leader of the Van Resistance and instrumental the foundation of the First Republic of Armenia in 1918
- Gevorg Manukian (born 1993), Armenian-born Ukrainian amateur boxer

== Manukyan ==
- Aghasi Manukyan (1967–2018), Armenian wrestler
- Anush Manukyan (born 1970), Armenian swimmer
- Aram Manukyan (born 1957), Armenian politician
- Arman Manukyan (1931–2012), Turkish lecturer, writer and economist
- Arthur Manukyan (born 1985), Armenian director and producer
- David Manukyan (born 1969), Ukrainian Greco Roman wrestler of Armenian descent
- Edward Manukyan (born 1981), Armenian-American composer
- Gagik Manukyan (1974–2002), Armenian football midfielder
- Gor Manukyan (born 1993), Armenian footballer
- Guzh Manukyan (1937–2025), Armenian actor
- Hamlet Manukyan (born 2007), Armenian artistic gymnast
- Khachik Manukyan (born 1964), Armenian poet
- Lilit Manukyan (born 1979), Armenian game show contestant in Spain
- Maksim Manukyan (born 1987), Armenian Greco-Roman wrestler
- Matild Manukyan (1914–2001), Armenian-Turkish businesswoman
- Mkhitar Manukyan (born 1973), Armenian-Kazakhstani wrestler
- Pandukht Manukyan (1951–2021), Armenian politician
- Samvel Manukyan (born 1974), Armenian Greco-Roman wrestler
- Samvel Manukyan (politician) (born 1976), Georgian-Armenian politician
- Vazgen Manukyan (born 1946), former Prime Minister of Armenia
- Yuri Manukyan (1940–2013), Soviet and Armenian politician and statesman

== Manoukian ==
- Alain Manoukian (born 1946), French fashion designer and owner of fashion group
- André Manoukian (born 1957), French-Armenian songwriter, arranger, and jazz musician
- Athena Manoukian (born 1994), Greek-Armenian singer and songwriter
- Catherine Manoukian (born 1981), Canadian Armenian violinist
- David Manoukian (born 1975), French-Belgian-Armenian businessman, real estate investor and founder, chairman, and CEO of the luxury social network service The-Sphere.com
- Diran Manoukian (1919–2020), French field hockey player and Olympian
- Don Manoukian (1934–2014), American-Armenian football guard and professional wrestler
- Gev Manoukian, Top 20 finalist in season 4 of So You Think You Can Dance in 2008
- Guy Manoukian (born 1976), Lebanese-Armenian musician, composer and pianist
- Noel Manoukian (1938–2019), justice of the Supreme Court of Nevada
- Rafi Manoukian (born 1961), Lebanese-born Armenian American businessman and politician
- Seta Manoukian, Lebanese painter

== Manoukyan ==
- Sargis Manoukyan, founding member of the Armenian rock band Empyray

== Manougian ==
- Manoug Manougian (1935–2024), Lebanese Armenian scientist, professor, and father of the Lebanese space program
- Nourhan Manougian (born 1948), 97th and incumbent Armenian Patriarch of Jerusalem serving the Armenian Patriarchate of Jerusalem since January 2013

== Manoogian ==
- Alex Manoogian (1901–1996), Armenian-American businessman, industrial engineer, and philanthropist
- Armenuhi Manoogian (1915–2011), known as Kay Armen, American Armenian singer, songwriter, radio, TV, film and stage actress
- Haig P. Manoogian (1916–1980), professor of film at New York University
- John Manoogian, multiple people
- Louise Manoogian Simone (1933–2019), founding member of the Board of Trustees of the Armenian General Benevolent Union
- Mari Manoogian (born 1992), State representative for Michigan's 40th House of Representatives district
- Richard Manoogian (born 1936), Armenian-American businessman
- Robert Manoogian, Jr. (1918–2002), better known as Bobby Managoff, American professional wrestler who was best known for his work with National Wrestling Alliance in the 1940s
- Torkom Manoogian (1919–2012), former Armenian Patriarch of Jerusalem who served as Patriarch from 1990 until his death in 2012

== Manookian ==
- Arman Manookian (1904–1931), American artist
- Jeff Manookian (1953–2021), American pianist, composer, and conductor
- Roland Manookian (born 1980), British actor

== See also ==
- AGBU Manoogian-Demirdjian School, Armenian-American private school located in Winnetka, Los Angeles, California, USA
- Manoogian Mansion, the official residence of the mayor of Detroit, Michigan
- Manuk (disambiguation) including a section of the Armenian given name Manuk
