= Manoug =

Manoug (Armenian: Մանուկ, lit. 'child') is a common Armenian given name.

- Manoug Exerjian (1898–1974), American Armenian architect
- Manoug Manougian (born 1935), Lebanese Armenian scientist, professor, and father of the Lebanese space program
- Manoug Parikian (1920–1987), British Armenian concert violinist and violin professor

== See also ==
- Manuk (disambiguation)
- Manouk (disambiguation)
