= Armenia national football team results =

The Armenia national football team represents Armenia in association football and is controlled by the Football Federation of Armenia (FFA), the governing body of the sport in the country. It competes as a member of the Union of European Football Associations (UEFA), which encompasses the countries of Europe.

Armenia joined the International Federation of Association Football (FIFA) in 1992, and played its first official match against Moldova on 14 October 1992.

== All time record ==
Key

- P = Matches played
- W = Matches won
- D = Matches drawn
- L = Matches lost
- GF = Goals for
- GA = Goals against
- +/– = Goal difference
- Countries are listed in alphabetical order

As of match played 15 November 2026

All-time record of Armenia national football team
Opponents	P	W	D	L	GF	GA	GD	% Won
Albania	6	1	1	4	5	10	−5	16.67
Algeria	1	0	0	1	1	3	−2	0
Andorra	8	7	1	0	20	2	+18	87.5
Belarus	8	2	2	4	10	11	–1	25
Belgium	6	1	0	5	2	11	−9	16.67
Bosnia and Herzegovina	4	1	0	3	6	10	−4	25
Bulgaria	2	1	0	1	2	2	0	50
Canada	1	1	0	0	3	1	+2	100
Chile	1	0	0	1	0	7	−7	0
Croatia	3	0	1	2	1	3	−2	0
Cyprus	9	1	3	5	9	17	−8	11.11
Czech Republic	6	1	0	5	4	16	−12	16.67
Denmark	8	1	1	6	7	13	−6	12.5
Ecuador	1	0	0	1	0	3	−3	0
El Salvador	1	1	0	0	4	0	+4	100
Estonia	7	2	3	2	7	7	0	28.57
Finland	6	0	1	5	1	11	−10	0
Faroe Islands	2	0	1	1	2	3	–1	0
France	5	0	0	5	2	14	−12	0
Georgia	9	2	2	5	9	23	−14	22.22
Germany	5	0	0	5	3	25	−22	0
Gibraltar	2	1	0	1	6	3	+3	50
Greece	6	1	1	4	3	7	−4	16.67
Guatemala	2	1	1	0	8	2	+6	50
Hungary	3	0	0	3	0	5	−5	0
Iceland	5	1	2	2	3	5	−2	20
Iran	1	0	0	1	1	3	−2	0
Israel	1	0	0	1	0	2	−2	0
Italy	4	0	1	3	5	18	−13	0
Jordan	1	0	1	0	0	0	0	0
Kazakhstan	9	5	3	1	15	8	+7	55.56
Kosovo	3	0	1	2	3	8	–5	0
Kuwait	1	0	0	1	1	3	−2	0
Latvia	8	4	2	2	10	7	+3	50
Lebanon	1	1	0	0	1	0	+1	100
Liechtenstein	6	3	3	0	10	5	+5	50
Lithuania	4	2	0	2	6	7	−1	50
Luxembourg	1	0	1	0	1	1	0	0
North Macedonia	15	4	3	8	18	27	−9	26.67
Malta	6	4	1	1	5	2	+3	66.67
Moldova	6	1	4	1	6	8	−2	16.67
Montenegro	6	2	2	2	9	11	−2	33.33
Morocco	1	0	0	1	0	6	−6	0
Netherlands	2	0	0	2	0	3	−3	0
Northern Ireland	4	2	2	0	3	1	+2	50
Norway	3	0	1	2	1	13	−12	0
Panama	1	0	1	0	1	1	0	0
Paraguay	2	1	0	1	2	3	−1	50
Peru	1	0	0	1	0	4	−4	0
Poland	7	1	1	5	4	15	−11	14.29
Portugal	8	0	2	6	5	23	−18	0
Republic of Ireland	6	2	0	4	6	8	−2	33.33
Romania	7	1	1	5	4	15	−11	14.29
Russia	5	0	1	4	1	10	−9	0
Saint Kitts and Nevis	1	1	0	0	5	0	+5	100
Scotland	2	0	0	2	1	6	−5	0
Serbia	5	0	2	3	1	8	−7	0
Slovakia	2	2	0	0	7	1	+6	100
Slovenia	1	0	0	1	1	2	-1	0
Spain	6	0	0	6	1	16	−15	0
Sweden	1	0	0	1	1	3	−2	0
Turkey	4	0	1	3	2	7	−5	0
Turkmenistan	1	1	0	0	1	0	+1	100
Ukraine	10	0	3	7	8	25	−17	0
United Arab Emirates	1	1	0	0	4	3	+1	100
United States	1	0	0	1	0	1	−1	0
Uzbekistan	2	2	0	0	5	1	+4	100
Wales	4	1	3	0	7	5	+2	25
68 countries	278	67	60	151	281	504	−223	24.1

== International goalscorers ==
As of Match played 13 October 2024

All goalscorers from Armenia national football team results.

32 goal

- Henrikh Mkhitaryan

14 goal

- Gevorg Ghazaryan
- Yura Movsisyan

11 goal

- Artur Petrosyan
- Marcos Pizzelli

9 goal

- Tigran Barseghyan
- Edgar Manucharyan

7 goal

- Ara Hakobyan

6 goal

- Arman Karamyan
- Aleksandr Karapetyan
- Aras Özbiliz
- Artur Sarkisov
- Armen Shahgeldyan
- Eduard Spertsyan

5 goal

- Robert Arzumanyan
- Vahan Bichakhchyan
- Lucas Zelarayán

4 goal

- Grant-Leon Ranos
- Hovhannes Hambardzumyan
- Tigran Yesayan
- Varazdat Haroyan

3 goal

- Éric Assadourian
- Albert Sarkisyan
- Karen Dokhoyan
- Ararat Arakelyan
- Ruslan Koryan
- Kamo Hovhannisyan

2 goal

- Razmik Grigoryan
- Garnik Avalyan
- Karapet Mikaelyan
- Artak Minasyan
- Andrey Movsisyan
- Artavazd Karamyan
- Hamlet Mkhitaryan
- Sargis Hovsepyan
- Levon Pachajyan
- Karlen Mkrtchyan
- Gegam Kadimyan
- Rumyan Hovsepyan
- Sargis Adamyan
- Wbeymar Angulo
- Khoren Bayramyan
- Artak Dashyan

1 goal

- Armen Adamyan
- Arsen Avetisyan
- Varazdat Avetisyan
- Hakob Ter-Petrosyan
- Harutyun Vardanyan
- Karen Barseghyan
- Karen Simonyan
- Vardan Khachatryan
- Felix Khojoyan
- Gagik Manukyan
- Rafael Nazaryan
- Hayk Hakobyan
- Arthur Minasyan
- Galust Petrosyan
- Aram Hakobyan
- Romik Khachatryan
- Artur Voskanyan
- Vahagn Minasyan
- Hovhannes Goharyan
- Aghvan Mkrtchyan
- Levon Hayrapetyan
- Hrayr Mkoyan
- Zaven Badoyan
- Artak Grigoryan
- Hayk Ishkhanyan
- Erik Vardanyan
- Artak Yedigaryan
- Artur Kartashyan
- Ivan Yagan
- Edgar Babayan
- Zhirayr Shaghoyan
- Nair Tiknizyan
- Edgar Sevikyan
- Gor Manvelyan

Own goal

- Óscar Sonejee (12 October 2005 vs Andorra)
- Dzmitry Verkhawtsow (15 August 2012 vs Belarus)
- Mërgim Mavraj (29 March 2015 vs Albania)
- Xavier García (1 June 2016 vs El Salvador)
- Stjepan Lončar (8 September 2019 vs Bosnia and Herzegovina)
- Noah Frommelt (25 March 2021 vs Liechtenstein)
- Ozan Kabak (25 March 2023 vs Turkey)
- Aleksandr Marochkin (7 June 2024 vs Kazakhstan)
- Kaspars Dubra (7 September 2024 vs Latvia)
