= Crimesterdam =

Armenian rock band from Yerevan

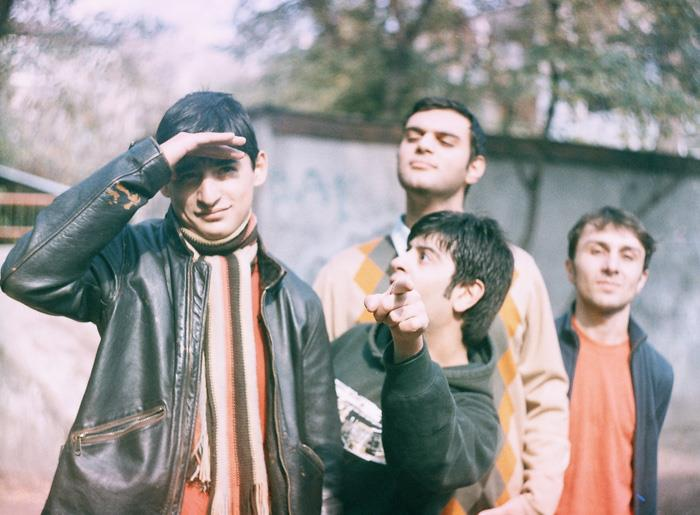
- Crimesterdam in 2011. From left to right: Yura Khachatryan, Dave Geodakian, Vladimir Hovhannisyan and Arthur Solakhyan

Background information
- Origin: Yerevan, Armenia
- Genres: Psychedelic rock, rock and roll
- Years active: 2010–2014
- Labels: Indie Libertines Records, Rekwired Rekords, Crimesterdam
- Members: Arthur Solakhyan; Dave Geodakian; Yura Khachatryan; Vladimir Hovhannisyan
- Past members: Sargis Shirinyan; George Hovhannisyan; David Olizarenko; Aram Avagyan; Vahe Aharonyan
- Website: www.crimesterd.am

Crimesterdam were an Armenian rock band from Yerevan. They are known for their rock and roll and psychedelic sound influenced by many bands such as Oasis, Blur, The Beatles, etc. They disbanded in 2014.

== Overview ==
=== Formation ===
Crimesterdam was founded in Yerevan in July 2010 by vocalist Arthur Solakhyan and guitarists Sarkis Shirinian and George Hovhannisyan. They played several concerts at local clubs with support from former The North Avenues bassist Dave Geodakian (who joined Crimesterdam in November 2010) and other musicians. Guitarist Yura Khachatryan joins the band in March 2011. The final line-up of Crimesterdam formed in June 2011 when Vladimir Hovhannisyan from Scream of Silence joined the band.

=== First releases ===
In December 2010 Crimesterdam signed to Indie Libertines Records label. They released their debut single Yeah Pappa I'm Smoking under Indie Libertines Records on 14 December, and several weeks later, on 31 January 2011, their acoustic EP, Acoustic for Indie Libertines, came out. It consisted of three songs, studio versions of the two of which are also featured on Mary Wants To Marry EP.

The band released their debut EP Mary Wants To Marry on 28 April 2011. EP was recorded and mixed at Dave Geodakian's home studio.

Later that year, on 3 September, Crimesterdam released Your Russian Wife EP, which was preceded with eponymous video.

=== Debut album ===
In October 2011 Crimesterdam started working on their debut full-length album. Their only LP, "Obsolete Modern Retro" was released on 18 June 2012.

=== Unfinished second album and break-up ===
Following the release of "Obsolete Modern Retro" and a series of concerts in Armenia, Crimesterdam started recording new songs and planning the release of the follow-up album. In November 2012 they released two separate singles, "An English Breakfast" and "Bring it On" as lead songs from the album under the working name "Yerevan Beat". However, during the recordings and songwriting sessions, the band decided to amicably break-up for personal reasons.

In 2022 the band released "OMR", a compilation containing 17 songs from their both EPs and "Obsolete Modern Retro" album. However, there are no plans on reforming and new releases.

== Discography ==
=== Albums ===
- Obsolete Modern Retro (18 June 2012)

=== EPs ===
- Mary Wants To Marry (28 April 2011)
- Your Russian Wife (3 September 2011)

=== Singles ===
- Underground Glory (26 March 2012)
- Friday (As It Starts) / It Is Not Dying (7 May 2012)
- Bring It On (6 November 2012)
- An English Breakfast (6 November 2012)

=== Compilations and Other ===
- Acoustic For Indie Libertines (31 January 2011)
- OMR (22 July 2022) In 2022 the band released OMR, a compilation containing 17 songs from their EPs and Obsolete Modern Retro.

== See also ==
- Armenian rock
- Music of Armenia
