= Manouk =

Manouk is a masculine Armenian or female Dutch given name. Notable people with the name include:

- Manouk Avedissian (1841–1925), more commonly known as Bechara Effendi or Bechara Effendi al-Muhandis, Ottoman Armenian administrator and engineer
- Manouk Gijsman (born 1992), Dutch figure skater
- Manouk Petrosian, birth name of Mkhitar Sebastatsi (1676–1749), Armenian Catholic monk, scholar and theologian
- Manouk Pluis (born 1999), Dutch actress

== See also ==
- Manuk (disambiguation)
