= Ivan Sokolov (composer) =

Russian-born composer and pianist

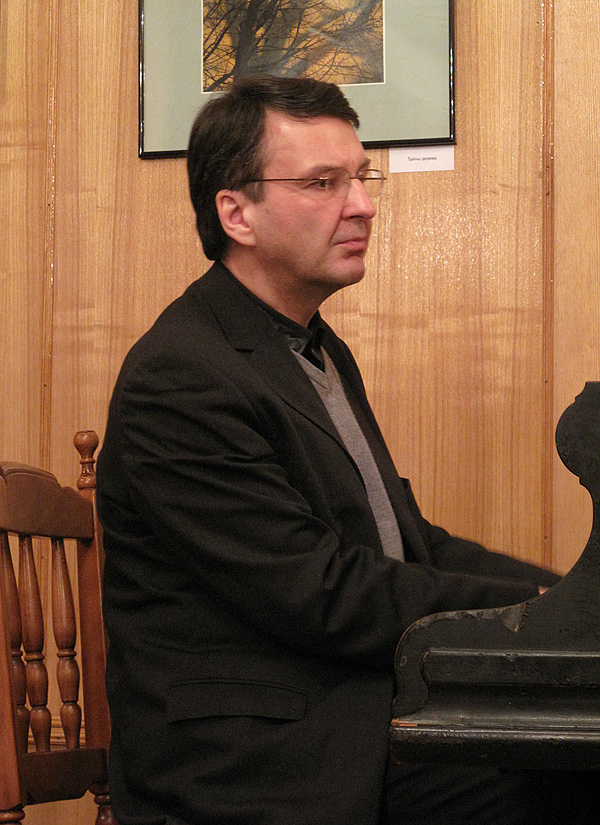
Ivan Sokolov plays at the Moscow Chekhov Library, 2009

Ivan Glebovich Sokolov (Russian: Иван Глебович Соколов, Ivan Glebovič Sokolov; August 29, 1960) is a Russian-born composer and pianist, currently living in Germany.

He is a member of the Russian-German Composers Quartet with Sokolov and Alexei Aigui from Moscow and Dietmar Bonnen and Manfred Niehaus from Cologne.
