= Artur Askaryan =

Armenian footballer (born 2006)

Personal information
- Date of birth: 26 April 2006 (age 20)
- Place of birth: Khankendi, Azerbaijan
- Height: 1.76 m (5 ft 9 in)
- Position: Central midfielder

Team information
- Current team: BKMA Yerevan
- Number: 29

Youth career
- Lernayin Artsakh

Senior career*
Years	Team	Apps	(Gls)
2022–2023	Lernayin Artsakh-2	8	(1)
2023–	BKMA Yerevan	36	(2)
2023–2024	→ BKMA Yerevan-2 (loan)	11	(1)

International career^{‡}
2024	Armenia U19	3	(0)
2024–	Armenia U21	8	(0)
2026–	Armenia	1	(0)
- * Club domestic league appearances and goals as of 11 September 2026 ‡ National team caps and goals as of 5 October 2026

Artur Askaryan (Armenian: Արթուր Ասկարյան; born 26 April 2006) is an Armenian football player who plays as a central midfielder for Armenian Premier League club BKMA Yerevan and the Armenia national team.

== Early life ==
Artur Askaryan was born in Stepanakert, Republic of Artsakh.

== International career ==
Askaryan made his debut for Armenia national team on 29 March 2026 in a friendly against Belarus.
