= Armenian rock =

Music genre or scene

Armenian Rock
- Stylistic origins: Hard rock, Heavy metal, Folk rock, rock and roll, British Invasion, Progressive rock
- Cultural origins: Mid 1960s, Soviet Armenia

Other topics
- Armenian Jazz – Armenian music – Soviet music – Russian rock

Armenian rock describes a wide variety of forms of rock music made in Armenia or by artists of Armenian descent.

Among the most recognized groups of Soviet era were Arthur Meschian's Arakyalner, 1+2, Kaleidoscope, and Bliki groups. Following the loosening of state control in the early 1980s, a number of Armenian rock bands gained followers in Western Europe. Asparez was the only Armenian rock act to release an LP on the Soviet label Melodiya. The bands Tarerk, Tessilk, 36.6 and Maximum had strong followings at home. The Armenian-American band System of a Down became an internationally recognized and politically active band.

== History ==
=== Soviet Era ===
Rock was greatly restricted for most of the period Armenia was under Soviet rule, being viewed by the CPSU as a Western anti-socialist influence. Yet, by the early 1970s, there were a range of popular bands in the capital city of Yerevan strong enough to compete with their Soviet counterparts, including four by Arthur Meschian.

By the 1980s, Armenian folk-rock groups were founded: Bambir, founded 1978 in Leninakan, and Vostan Hayots, founded in 1986 in Yerevan. In 1982 Bambir won the "Folk Music Award" at the International Festival in Lida, Belarus. Other more obscure groups were also founded in the same time period like Zartong, a short-lived Armenian progressive folk group from France.

As the Soviet rock scene grew larger in the late 1980s, bands like Asparez and Ayas attracted international audiences due to the new popularity of oriental rock these two bands were among original contributors, that was described first time in Melodie und Rhythmus magazine. Ayas was formed in 1986 by the Yerevan Komitas State Conservatory graduate Artur Mitinyan, and a year later won Best Song of the Year award at Yerevan's "Rock, Rock, Rock Festival". Later they won the "Sisian Rock Festival" award. Elips was another important band of the era formed in 1986. In summer 1986 “Elips” went on tour to Latvia, where they played together with a Riga-based group “Pilligrim”. Simultaneously with the fame, the group gained the hatred of the Soviet Communist party nomenclature and was prohibited as an anti-Soviet group. Their most popular song - "Patkeratsrek" (Imagine) remains as one of the hymns of Armenian rock.

The development of rock music in Soviet Armenia was accompanied by difficulty concerning the accessibility of foreign musical recordings and the restrictions placed upon public performances. Hovhannes Kourghinyan, the vocalist of Vostan Hayots, in an interview conducted in 2005, described how much of his exposure to Western rock music during the 1970s was made possible through relatives residing outside the Soviet Union. The performance of such music, however, was not always well received by educational and cultural institutions. Kourghinyan, for instance, recalls being reprimanded by the administration of his school following a performance of two compositions by the English hard rock band Deep Purple.

=== Post-Soviet Era ===
In the early 1990s, an Armenian progressive rock scene developed. Formed by Vahagn Papayan, Dumbarton Oaks was one of the first bands trying to combine rock with classical music, an example of this is "Once Upon a Time There Lived a Cadence". The psychedelic side of prog-rock was represented in the much heavier works of MDP. Though only in the 2000s Artsruni and Oaksenham released their albums with the leading French label, Musea, being the pioneers among local bands releasing albums beyond sentimental market. Both bands boast presence of their albums on iTunes and Allmusic.com. Other popular Armenian rock bands of this era included Breeze, Ambehr, The Kings' Cross, Alter Ego, IF by Hayk F. Gyolchanyan, Lav Eli and Empyray. Beerdingungs Lauten was the only representative of grindcore style. Former "Lav Eli" guitarist Gor Mkhitarian is currently involved with the folk rock scene in the United States regularly releasing his albums there.

A notable example is Deti Picaso a Russia-based folk prog-band consisted of mostly Armenians was noticed and appreciated in Armenia and revived interest towards folk music.

In the same early 1990s the Armenian rock bands got to have a fanzine - Mark's Gazette, self-published by Arman Padaryan (aka Mark) for the next 10 years.

The dissolution of the Soviet Union in 1991, despite allowing musicians to operate in the absence of many of the restrictions previously imposed upon them, was followed by a period of economic hardship in Armenia. Given the difficulties associated with the production and distribution of electricity throughout the country, the performance of rock music became particularly problematic. In the case of Vostan Hayots, the circumstances resulted in the band resorting to acoustic performances until 1993. The production of a rock opera entitled Artavazd and Cleopatra, for which the musicians had received financial support from the Ministry of Culture, was also left unfinished due to the continuing energy crisis.

=== Heavy metal ===
Heavy metal has been a part of the Armenian rock scene since the Soviet period, with Asparez and Ayas being among the earlier representatives of the genre. Several recordings produced by the two bands during the late 1980s are preserved in the archives of the Public Radio of Armenia. While much of the earlier development of Armenian metal was associated with traditional heavy metal, the 1990s saw the emergence of bands whose musical characteristics were considerably different from those of their predecessors. Beerdigings Lauten, formed in 1993, for instance, made use of elements of death metal and grindcore in its compositions. The band's recordings, produced at Ardzagank Studio in Yerevan in 1994, were subsequently reissued by Metal Race Records.

In the following decades, Armenian metal diversified into several subgenres, including black metal. The 2026 Highland Metalfest programme featured bands such as Divahar and Ildaruni.

Ildaruni, formed in 2016, derives its name from an ancient name of the Hrazdan River. According to the members of the band, in an interview conducted by Guido Segers in 2018, much of the lyrical content of their compositions is based on historical events and beliefs associated with pre-Christian Armenia, with particular attention being given to the Kingdom of Van. The band's first studio album, Beyond Unseen Gateways, was released in April 2021 through the Swedish record label Black Lion Records.

=== Contemporary Armenian rock and metal ===
The development of the Armenian rock scene throughout the 2010s and 2020s has been accompanied by the establishment of several projects concerned with the production and promotion of music by local artists. Among such projects is Tonelab, a recording studio established in Yerevan in April 2023. According to Arpine Hovhannisian, the studio, co-founded by Narek Tovmasyan, the drummer of the Armenian progressive rock band Rozen Tal, is used not only for the production of musical recordings but also for the organization of concerts and charitable events. The members of Rozen Tal, having received considerable guidance from the members of Bambir during the earlier stages of their musical careers, have also made use of the studio to assist younger musicians with the development of their compositions.

The involvement of rock musicians in the political developments of Armenia can be observed in the events surrounding the Velvet Revolution of 2018. One of the slogans used extensively throughout the demonstrations, urging participants to take a step against the government of Serzh Sargsyan, was inspired by a composition of the Armenian alternative metal band Vordan Karmir.

The contemporary Armenian metal scene encompasses a variety of musical genres. Rampant Beast has been described as blackened speed metal, while Exileth plays death metal.

A number of recordings produced by contemporary Armenian metal bands have been distributed through record labels situated outside the country. Among such recordings are Into the Infernal Pyre (2024) by Rampant Beast and Death of the Almighty (2025) by Exileth. Rampant Beast, initially formed under the name Intoxicated in 2019, underwent a change in its musical characteristics alongside the change in its name, with much of its subsequent material being influenced by speed and black metal compositions of the 1980s. Exileth, on the other hand, is primarily associated with death metal, with its first studio album being released through Satanath Records in March 2025.

In January 2026, an episode of the programme Panorama Yerevan, hosted by Lucia Kagramanyan on NTS Radio, was dedicated to the development of Armenian metal throughout the preceding decades. The programme, prepared with the assistance of members of Ildaruni and Gyurza, presented recordings belonging to different periods and subgenres of Armenian metal.

=== Expatriate Armenian rock ===
Expatriate Armenian rock musicians in the US during the 1990s were few, with fewer venues for them to perform. Tigran Mousoian, president of the Armenian Musicians & Artists Center, had organized two festivals in Yerevan, and then planned an Armenian Rock Festival in Glendale, California.

The development of Armenian rock has not been geographically restricted to Armenia. Among its internationally recognized representatives is System of a Down, an Armenian-American metal band from California, whose compositions and public activities have frequently addressed subjects concerning Armenian history and identity. Despite the Armenian descent of all four members of the band, System of a Down had not performed in Armenia prior to 2015. On April 23 of that year, on the eve of the centenary of the Armenian Genocide, the band gave a free concert at Republic Square in Yerevan. The concert constituted the final performance of the band's Wake Up the Souls tour, organized in commemoration of the centenary of the genocide.

== Audience in Armenia ==
Local rock groups in Armenia primarily perform in local clubs in Yerevan and Gyumri. Bands such as SARD, Bambir 2, Vordan Karmir, Reincarnation and the speed-metal band Aramazd received media exposure, especially after their videos were broadcast on national television. Roxygeen was a cover-band, while STRYFE and Sworn performed progressive metal. MDP and Oaksenham in addition to Bambir 2, Blood Covenant, STRYFE, Sworn and Empyray were among the Armenian rock bands active in the new millennium. Arthur Meschian performed concerts at the Yerevan Opera Theatre and Complex Sports and Concerts Complex. The Beautified Project is an Armenian alternative rock band that has performed internationally. The band has played concerts worldwide.

== Music awards ==
Since 2004 International Armenian Music Award announces winners in various rock categories. Among laureates and nominees there were Bambir 2, Empyray, Oaksenham, Hexen, Gor Mkhitaryan, Red Snow and others. In 2009 Lebanese Armenian, Eileen Khatchadourian's album Midan received the award of the Best Rock Album of the year. Another ceremony is Armenia's National Music Awards showcase of the Armenian Television 1st Channel, which claims best performers of the year in Armenia. At the 6th ceremony, which took place on March 27, 2010, the best rock group was announced Dorians, a group featuring a singer Gor Sujyan.

Unfortunately both awards has not gained authority, and are often boycotted by more intransigent Armenian rock musicians.

== Rock festivals ==
In the late 1990s and early 2000s, festivals organized by the ACCEA (Armenian Center for Contemporary Experimental Art) signaled a rebirth of the Armenian rock music scene, with many new bands and musicians coming from the heartland region of Vanadzor. Among the most popular bands at that time there were "Vostan Hayots", "Angels", and punk rockers "Ass Kissers". There was a splash of interest in very heavy acts such as "Beerdigungs Läuten" playing quality grindcore metal.

In September 2007 Rock4Peace festival concerts organized with participation of Germans from Kultur Aktiv e.V. and Vibrographus were held in Yerevan, Gyumri and Stepanakert. The reunion of Ayas took place after the meeting of the band's core musicians in Moscow, whilst Vostan Hayots continued irregularly appear with club concerts in Yerevan. Armenian rock started to live another wave of revival and yet local rock music does not have an industrial sense, though Armenian rock musicians started to participate in the commercially and politically biased projects such as two "Rock-and-Dram" festivals were held, on April 13 and November 23, 2007.

Tigran Mousoian, president of The Armenian Musicians & Artists Center, organized two festivals in Yerevan, and planned Armenian Rock Festival in Glendale, California.

Throughout the 2010s, a number of festivals dedicated to rock music were organized in Armenia, providing opportunities for musicians belonging to different generations of the Armenian rock scene to perform alongside one another. Among such events was the Armenia in Rock festival, which took place at Freedom Square in Yerevan on September 27 and 28, 2019. The festival, organized at the initiative of the Armenian Rock Association, consisted of performances by 18 Armenian rock bands.

The involvement of Armenian metal musicians in festivals has not been geographically restricted to Armenia. The first edition of Satanath Records Fest, organized in October 2024, consisted of three consecutive concerts in Batumi, Tbilisi and Yerevan, with the Armenian death metal band Exileth participating in all three. The second edition of the festival, announced for Yerevan and Tbilisi in October 2025, listed bands from a number of countries outside the Caucasus.

Highland Metalfest 2026, organized by Zhesht Events, was scheduled for June 12 to 14, with performances across four stages. While the performances on the first and third days were scheduled to take place at the Yerevan State Puppet Theatre and Tonelab respectively, those of the second day were scheduled across two open-air stages near the village of Zovuni.

The announced programme of Highland Metalfest 2026 brought together Armenian metal bands whose periods of activity and musical characteristics varied considerably. Alongside bands such as Ayas, whose origins date back to the Soviet period, and Divahar, whose activities date back to the late 2000s, the programme listed performances by a number of bands formed in more recent years, such as Rampant Beast, Mudlung and Pareidolia. The announced lineup also included bands from Georgia, Germany and Cyprus, among which were Psychonaut 4, Ennui, Dismorial, Lagnia and Ka'aper.

== Concerts by outside groups ==
A range of top-class concerts featuring legendary rock groups has been organized in Armenia by Vibrgraphus in 2009 and 2010 including visits of Jethro Tull, Uriah Heep, John McLaughlin and Deep Purple.
