= Armen Gyulbudaghyants =

Armenian footballer (born 1966)

Personal information
- Date of birth: 19 December 1966 (age 59)
- Place of birth: Kirovakan, Armenian SSR
- Height: 1.78 m (5 ft 10 in)
- Position: Midfielder

Senior career*
Years	Team	Apps	(Gls)
1983–1984	Spartak Hoktemberyan	23	(1)
1988	Spartak Hoktemberyan	34	(1)
1989–1990	FC Lori	61	(7)
1992–1994	Banants	63	(17)

International career
1994	Armenia	1	(0)

Managerial career
- 2001–2003: Banants
- 2002: Armenia U19
- 2002: Armenia U21
- 2007–2008: Pyunik
- 2008–2009: Banants
- 2011–2013: Impulse FC
- 2013–2014: Alashkert
- 2015: Gol Gohar (caretaker)
- 2015–2016: Gol Gohar (assistant)
- 2016–2017: Padideh (assistant)
- 2017–2018: FC Pyunik
- 2018–2019: Armenia
- 2023–: Armenia U21
- 2023–: BKMA
- * Club domestic league appearances and goals

Armen Gyulbudaghyants (Armenian: Արմեն Գյուլբուդաղյանց; born 19 December 1966), is an Armenian football manager and former player. He is the former manager of the Armenia national team.

== Career ==
During his career, Gyulbudaghyants managed the Armenian Premier League clubs of FC Banants, FC Pyunik, Impulse FC and Alashkert FC.

In 2002, he managed the Armenia U19 and Armenia U21 national teams.

== Managerial statistics ==
As of Match played 15 October 2019

Team	From	To	Record				
Team	From	To	G	W	D	L	Win %
Armenia	September 2018	present	12	5	2	5	41.67
