= Andranik Adamyan =

Armenian football manager

Managerial career
- Years: Team
- Shirak Gyumri
- Armenia U-21
- 2002-2003: Armenia national football

Andranik Adamyan is an Armenian football manager. He was a caretaker manager for the Armenia national team in 2002 and 2003. He also managed Armenian Premier League club Shirak Gyumri and Armenia U-21 team.
