= Bambir =

The Bambir
- Also known as: Angin Qarer
- Origin: Gyumri, Armenia
- Genres: rock, folk rock, Ethnic rock
- Years active: 1978–present
- Website: bambir.band

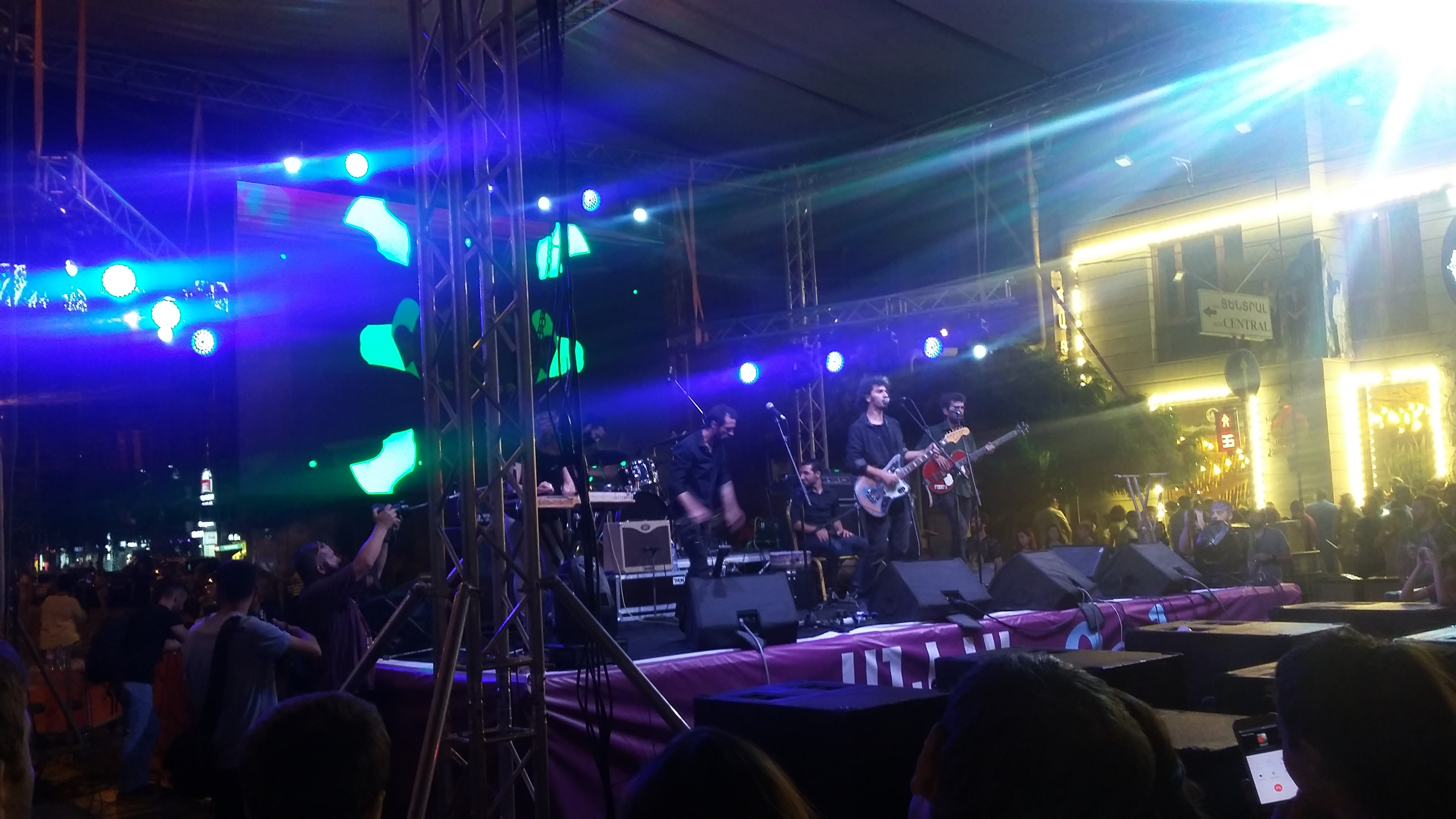
Bambir performing at a concert

The Bambir is an Armenian rock band from Gyumri. Spanning 4 decades and with more than 50 musicians passing through its ranks, the band has moved into its second generation- as in, sons of the original members are operating as a separate four-piece that is still part of the original ensemble.

Founded by Jag Barseghyan in the 1970s in Gyumri, Armenia, The Bambir was lauded as one of the best rock groups in the Soviet Union, performing original material, traditional Armenian songs, and modern arrangements of Komitas and medieval Armenian music. Today, Jag Barseghyan records solo albums, ensemble albums, and performs with original members of The Bambir and other international musicians. In 1982 The Bambir won the Folk Music Award at the International Festival in Lida, Belarus. They celebrated their 20th anniversary in Moscow in 1998 and in Gyumri at their first Biennial. On their 30th anniversary, they released Armenian Scotch, an album dedicated to the 140th anniversary of Hovhannes Tumanyan and the 250th anniversary of Robert Burns.

A separate but connected four-piece rock band The Bambir (Progressive Ethnic Rock'n'Roll) formed in Gyumri later in 1994, by Narek Barseghyan (son of Jag), Arman Kocharyan, Arik Grigoryan and Vardan Paremuzyan. While they started playing together in Armenia, they've earned a reputation in Russia, France, the United States, Turkey, Georgia, Lebanon, Poland and beyond. They were based in Ireland in 2012 and toured in the United States in 2016-2017.

They write and perform their own music written by Narek and Arik, and are known for their unique stage presence and sound in their live shows.

== Early history ==
In the sixties Jag began traveling to the city of Gyumri, traditionally Armenia's city of arts and one of the cultural centers of the Soviet Union. While there weren't many people listening to rock music in Yerevan at the time, an underground scene seemed to be thriving in Gyumri. It was there that he began to find like-minded individuals and appreciators of the music he loved. He started jamming with Robert Kocharyan (not the former Armenian president) on bass, Suren Martirosyan on guitar, and Levon "Watts" Nouroyan on drums, calling themselves Angin Qarer ("precious stones", in the Armenian language), playing hard rock. They soon morphed into their folk "bard rock" style, arranging pieces by Komitas and moving on to their own original material, changing their name to Bambir. Performances and many albums followed and they toured Armenia, Russia, Europe and the United States. Members of the original band reunite for special concerts, and Jag continues to actively record and collaborate with local and international artists.

He has been awarded by the Armenian Ministry of Culture for his achievements in Contemporary Armenian Music.

== Second Generation ==
Narek (son of Jag) and Arman (son of Robert Kocharyan, an original member of "Angin Qarer"), friends since birth, grew up in Gyumri in the creative environment built by their fathers and community. They picked up the guitar and bass at a very young age. They met Arik (flute) when they were nine years old, and their trio began jamming and performing on their own. In 1999-2000 they travelled to Los Angeles and New York, and even recorded an album (never released) in California but had to return to Armenia, and school. Ashot Korganyan joined them on drums in 2001. As the boys grew up in Gyumri they became better musicians and started playing more and more. The four-piece returned to Los Angeles in 2007, and Ashot left the band upon their return. That same year, the now trio travelled to Shoushi in Artsakh for a music festival and Narek, Arman, and Arik met Vardan, originally from Vanadzor, Lori region. They continue to work with Jag.

The band's notoriety grew as they finished university and continued to gig, and they started to attract international attention. They played in Moscow, Paris, Istanbul, Beirut, Tbilisi, and all over Armenia, placing third in 2010's Eurovoice Competition in Athens. They made the decision to make a go of breaking into the European market, and moved to Dublin in January 2012. Their incredible musicianship and intense energy on-stage made them stand out immediately, and it wasn't long before they were booked for festivals like KnockanStockan, No Place Like Dome, Body&Soul, and Electric Picnic, as well as special events like launches and Tower Records' 19th birthday. They became known for their relentless gigging, sometimes playing 3 shows/night- their final performances in Dublin, 2012 were on Arthur's Day when they played 3 times in The Mercantile, The Stag's Head, and The Sweeney Mongrel. State called them "Ireland's hairiest and hardest working band," featuring them as part of their 2012 Electric Picnic coverage. They appeared on Near FM, Radio Nova 100FM (Ireland), Dublin City FM, and WDAR. While much of their live sets in Ireland are in English, they continue to perform and write songs in the Armenian language as well.

They toured in the United States in 2016-2017 (Austin, Chicago, Los Angeles, New York, Washington,..) performing at SXSW and the notorious The Viper Room.

The band has recorded with international musicians like Dietmar Bonnen.

They write and perform their own music written by Narek and Arik and are known for their stage presence in their live shows and unique sound.

From 2019, The Bambir have been inspired by the sound of Mar Margaryan’s qanun, reputed for her way of playing and her collaborations with many artists. Together, they continue to experiment and revisit Armenian folk.

Since 2017, Narek and Vardan have been playing as well as a power duo called “ Freedom is Expensive”.

== Bambir Members ==
Present Members:

- Gaguik "Jag" Barseghyan (founder) 1978–present
- Grigor Mirzoyan -cello-2012–present
- Anna Kocharyan -violin-2017–present
- Sergo Tonoyan -keyboards-1982-85/2012–present
- Narek Barseghyan – guitar, vocals 2002–2017
- Arik Grigoryan – flute, percussions, vocals 2002–present
- Arman Kocharyan – bass, vocals 2002–present
- Vardan Paremuzyan– drums 2007–present

The Bambir Members (Second generation):

- Narek Barseghyan – guitar, vocals/1994–present
- Arik Grigoryan – flute, percussions, vocals/1994–present
- Arman Kocharyan – bass, vocals/1994–present
- Vardan Paremuzyan– drums, vocals/2007–present

Past Members:

- Tatul Yeghiazaryan† 1993 - 1999
- Gourgen Hakobjanyan 1978 -2009
- Gaguik Hakobjanyan 1978 - 1983
- Artash Harutyunyan 1978 - 1983
- Mkrtich Hovhannisyan 1979 -1984
- Vrezh Aramyan 1979-1982
- Grigor Virabyan 1982 - 2001
- Armen Karapetyan 1983 - 1988
- Vardan Varosyan 1985 -1988
- Armen Sargsyan 1980 - 1998
- Edvard Yuzbashyan 1980 - 1984
- Murad Gasabyan bass 1983 - 1993
- Hrant Melqonyan bass 1987 - 1993
- Hakob Yesayan 1989 - 1993
- Vladimir Voskanyan 1997 - 1999
- Artour Hovhanisyan 1986 -1993
- Varouzh Vardanyan 1989-1990
- Ashot Hovhanisyan 1987 - 1993
- Seiran Vardanyan 1998 - 2002
- Levon Davtyan 2002 - 2004
- Ani Arakyan 2009–2015
- Armen Karjyan 2012-2015
- Ashot Korganyan - drums/2001 - 2007
- Mher Vardikyan - guitar/1997 -2002
- Garik Barseghyan 1992 - 1993

'Angin Qarer - "Priceless Stones

- Gagik "Jag" Barseghyan - Guitar 1969-1978
- Souren Martirosyan - Guitar 1969-1978
- Levon Nouroyan - Drums 1969-1978
- Robert Kocharyan - Bass 1969-1978
- Matos Margaryan - 1969-1978

== Discography and Releases ==
Bambir (Jag):

- 1999 – "Quake" Album
- 2003 - Quake Released by Pomegranate Music Label http://pomegranatemusic.com/recordings/bambir/ http://www.allmusic.com/album/quake-mw0000670482 http://www.globalrhythm.net/WorldMusicCDReviews/MiddleEastNorthAfrica/BAMBIR.cfm
- 2003 – "J&G" Album
- 2005 – "Blind Alley" Album
- 2008 - Alexandropol- recorded with “Dietmar Bonnen" (Live)
- 2011 – "Armenian Scotch" Album
- 2020 - "Home" Jag.Bonnen.Barz Album
- 2021 - "Armabeton" Album

Recorded albums, EP sessions, Singles by The Bambir (Second generation):

- 2003 - "Alabalanitsa" (Nursery Rhymes) Single
- 2004 - "Dark City Train" Single
- 2005 - "BBR". Best Folk Rock Album 2005 at the Armenian Music Awards. LA, California, in 2005.
- 2007 - "The Black" Album
- 2010 - "Thats Fine with Us" Single
- 2012 - "Urbane/Urban" Single
- 2013 - "Do You Love Me" Single
- 2013 - "Index Sessions" EP
- 2013 - "Imitate" Single
- 2015 - "Upsessions" Album
- 2017 - "Bambir Anthology Vol. 1" Album
- 2018 - "Arev e Elel" Single
- 2018 - "Sev Kshoghas" Single
- 2019 - "Migutse" Single
- 2019 - "Eveline " Single
- 2020 - "Gzhi Harsaniq" Album
- 2020 - "S.O.S" Single
- 2020 - "2 Kes" Single
- 2022 - "Sea Inside" Album

Awards

- 2003 & 2004 - Best Rock Band, Armenian National Music Award (Yerevan, Armenia).
- 2005 - Best Folk Rock Album, Armenian Music Awards (Hollywood, California)
- 2010 - Super Finalist, Eurovoice Music Contest 2010 (Athens, Greece)
- 2015 - For music development, Caucasian Music Awards Phoenix (Tbilisi, Georgia)
- 2015 - Best Ethnic Project, Zolotaya Gorgulya Awards, 16 Tons Club (Moscow, Russia)

== Music videos ==
- 2003 - "Alabalanitsa" Music video
- 2007 - "Children's games" Music Video
- 2004 - "Dark City Train" Music Video
- 2010 - "Thats Fine with Us" Music Video
- 2012 - "Urbane/Urban" Music Video
- 2013 - "Do you love me" Music Video
- 2013 - "Khio" Music Video
- 2014 - "Black Blouse" Music Video
- 2020 - "2 Kes" Music Video
- 2020 - "Gzhi Harsaniq" Music Video
