= Oaksenham =

American progressive rock band

- Origin: Yerevan, Armenia
- Genre: Progressive rock
- Years active: 2001–present
- Members: Vahagn Papayan Anna Adamyan Valery Tolstov Koryun Bobikyan Vardan Gasparyan Ashot Korganyan

Oaksenham is an electric and acoustic progressive rock band established in 2001. Oaksenham’s core consists of experienced musicians that have played in a range of influential Armenian rock bands: Vahagn Papayan (a.k.a. Dumbarton Oaks) and Ashot Korganyan from the same progressive band very popular in 1990s in Armenia (a.k.a. Strangers, Bambir 2).

Professionally educated musicians, nearly all of them are graduates of the Yerevan State Komitas Conservatory. They soon proved their serious intentions upon giving a very good concert in June 2002. In addition to the electric program, the band also boasts an acoustic one, part of which was presented to public on March 18, 2004 at the opening of the British Posters Exhibition organized by British Council Yerevan. This time it was their “Beatles Fantasy” performed with a woodwind ensemble that met a very warm response from public and media. The Oaksenham were highly claimed in the leading European and North American prog journals for their debut live CD “Woden’s Eve” self-released in 2004, among them Classic Rock Society (UK), Expose (United States), Prog-Resiste (Belgium), Strutter-zine (Netherlands). There are articles dedicated to the band in the Gibraltar Encyclopedia of Progressive Rock, (United States).

In summer 2006, the band finished mixing and mastering of their first studio album “Conquest of the Pacific” and already received positive comments for a promo version of the album. As a result, Oaksenham signed a respected license deal with a leading French label Musea and the album's official release occurred in November 2007. Following the release, the album was met with acclaim from general public and prog-connoisseurs. This debut studio album was considered as one of the best prog releases in 2007. Very respectful articles appeared in the GEPR, Progressor, and Proggnosis.

For the last two years Oaksenham has been recording its second studio album "Upon All the Living and the Dead," planned for release in 2013.

== Recordings ==
- 2002 Woden's Eve Live (Live, Armenia)
- 2007 Conquest of the Pacific (Musea, France)

== Excerpts from Reviews ==
In November 2007, Progressor reviewed Oaksenham's *Conquest of the Pacific*, describing it as a mature debut release and placing the band within contemporary symphonic progressive rock.

"Oaksenham have potential to please a prog-rock audience, especially those with a more eccentric outlook." Martin Hudson Classic Rock Society, UK (2004)

"A solid continuation of the classic prog style." Peter Thelen, Expose, USA (2004)

"The music of Oaksenham is all well orchestrated and expertly performed instrumental arrangements." Fred Trafton, GEPR, USA (2004)

“People looking for a real quality instrumental Prog-rock album need to check out this release”, Strutter-zine, Netherlands (2004)

== Personnel ==
=== Line-up 2004-2009 ===
- Vahagn Papayan – bass
- Anna Adamyan – keyboards
- Valeri Tolstov – flute, keyboards
- Vardan Gasparyan – guitars
- Koriun Bobikyan – violin, percussion
- Ashot Korganyan – drums

=== Line-up 2010-current ===
- Vahagn Papayan – bass
- Ashot Korganyan – drums
- Vardan Gasparyan – guitars
- Vardan Harutyunyan – keyboards
- Aram Asatryan – violin
