= Arthur Meschian =

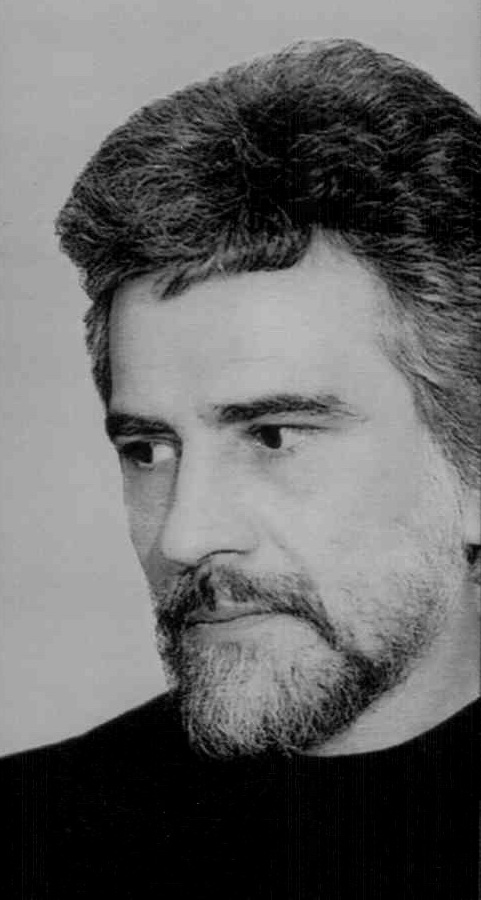
- Meschian in 1996

Background information
- Born: Արթուր Մեսչյան; March 3, 1949 (age 77); Yerevan, Armenian SSR, Soviet Union
- Genres: Rock
- Occupations: Musician, architect
- Years active: 1960s–present

Arthur (Artashes) Meschian (Armenian: Արթուր Մեսչյան; born March 3, 1949, in Yerevan, Armenia) is an Armenian architect, musician, composer, poet, singer and painter. He is also known as one of the founders of Armenian rock. He was the founder and the lead singer of Apostles (1968 – 1979), the first rock band performing songs in their native language in the history of the Soviet Union. He is the author of different architectural projects, including Guest House and the new building of Matenadaran in Armenia.

== Biography ==
Since childhood, Meschian has been interested in music and arts; singing songs in languages ranging from Armenian to English. At the age of seven, he started taking violin and piano lessons at the school of music named after A. Spendiaryan. It was during those years when he made his first steps in writing songs and joined the boy's chorus at the National Academic Theater of Opera and Ballet. In 1973, he briefly joined the chorus of the Mother See of Holy Etchmiadzin. Even though his stay was short (less than a year) in the chorus, it had a profound influence on his subsequent musical creations. While still at school, Meschian wrote some of his early masterpieces including “Where were you, God?,” “The Will,” and “The Old Man.” In 1965, he first performed his well acclaimed and widely controversial “Where were you, God?” in the auditorium of number 122 secondary school where he was a student at the time. In 1966, he got accepted to the department of architecture at the National Polytechnic University of Armenia.

In 1967, Meschian, along with his friends Levon Melikian and Gregory Nalbandian, founded a rock band which they initially did not give a name. The band was simply referred to as “The Band of the Department of Architecture.” After giving a series of concerts throughout 1967 and on, the band gained an immense deal of acclaim among the youth. By blending Armenian spiritual music with the thriving rock of the time, the band left a remarkable impression on its listeners and became a true revelation. As a result, the activists at the party Central Committee raised concerns about the band's prolific endeavors. The committee led an anti-Meschian campaign accusing him of anti-Soviet propaganda and calling the band members “Newly Ordained Apostles.” It was, in much part, due to the name calling, that the band was later named “The apostles.” The remarkable success of the Apostles was not hindered by anti-Meschian Communist efforts. In the early 1970s, Meschian composed the first Armenian rock opera, “The Insane Asylum” which vastly contributed to the band's publicity. Thereafter, the band started giving concerts in numerous universities and cities such as Gyumri, Moscow, Yerevan and Tallinn. In 1971, Meschian gave an outstanding performance in the USSR festival for young musicians in Poland, where the band was only allowed to participate under the guidance of the Communist Committee Activists. Despite the fact that the Apostles found themselves performing in various republics throughout the Soviet Union, they always remained loyal to performing in their native Armenian.

In 1972, Meschian successfully graduated from university, but due to the anti-Meschian attitudes infested in the Armenian Soviet Socialist Republic, it took him two years to find a job as an architect. In 1974, Meschian was employed by the Armenian Governmental Project where he participated in the development of Zvartnots Airport in Yerevan. In 1973, he briefly joined the chorus of the Mother See of Holy Etchmiadzin, where he made the acquaintance of Vazgen I, the Catholicos of the Armenian Apostolic Church who commissioned him to write a requiem dedicated to the martyrs of the Armenian genocide. With Moushegh Ishkhan’s permission, Meschian used some of his verses in writing the requiem. In 1975, Meschian performed his requiem at the Mother See of Holy Etchmiadzin, and with the support of the Catholicos, he later recorded the masterpiece.

In the beginning of the next decade, the Apostles, unexpectedly, disappeared from the musical arena. At the time of its existence, the band featured various musicians such as Ashot Adamyan, Gevorg Mangasaryan, Viguen Stepanyan, Gevorg Jangulyan, Movses Muradyan, Ashot Eghikyan, Stanislav Buniatyan, Rostom Ohanyan and Ashot Eghikyan. In 1984, Meschian started his own musical path with his students, Vahan Artsruni and Gourgen Melikyan. In the 1980s, he also got leading roles in two motion pictures. He became a part of the film, The Glowing Fire of the Night, playing the role of Michael Nalbandian. That was an opportunity for him to have his songs included in the movie. The film gave him basis to do a professional recording in the Melodia Studio of Moscow. The film highlighted three of Meschian’s works, “Ancient Land,” “Epitaph” and “Resurrection.” The second film he did was "And, Everything will Recur," which came out in 1989, when Meschian had already moved to the United States. In the early 1980s Meschian was the leader of the Armenian Industrial Project Studio of Architecture. At the time, he had supervised the reconstruction of Lazarian Seminary in Moscow (Later the Embassy of the Armenian Republic.) He also laid out the construction of the building of Admission for the Armenian government in Yerevan, the extension building to Matenadaran, the library of Manuscripts whose construction got delayed due to the 1988 earthquake and only resumed in 2007, when Meschain was back in Yerevan.

In 1989, Meschian, along with his family, moved to Boston, where he finally managed to properly record his songs. In 1990, he started performing in places such as the Armenian Church of Boston, the center of Armenian Relief Fund and The Wilshire Ebell Theatre. In 1990, he recorded his first album called Catharisis. In addition, he formed a new band called Apostles 90 with Wayne Johnson on the guitar, John Leftwich on the bass and Art Rodrigues on the drums. In 1993, Meschian released yet another album called The Monologue of the Insane Violinist, and gave a series of concerts with Apostles 90 in Pasadena, CA. In 1995, Meschian released two other albums; Wander, which included a couple of songs from the Requiem and Communion which he deems the pinnacle of his musical career. In 1996 he first performed the Communion at the First Church of Nazarene in Pasadena. Later in the same year, his Communion was performed four days in a row at the National Academic Theater for Opera and Ballet in Yerevan.

In 2001, Meschian released his hit collection featuring four CDs encompassing “The monologue of a Crazy Violinist,” “Catharsis”, “Catharsis 2” and “Communion.” In 2003, he gave a concert at the Kodak Theatre (now Dolby Theatre ) where he presented his new songs, and performed the Sayat Nova piece. In 2005, after living in the United States for 17 years, Meschian and his wife returned to Armenia. There, he gave a series of concerts which were highly esteemed and appreciated by both the general public and his long term fans who had been loyal to his art since the Soviet times.

In 2007, the construction of the new section of the Mesrop Mashtots Institute of Ancient Manuscripts begins under the guidance of the chief architect Arthur Meschian. Meschian worked very hard to finish the project before schedule in 2011. Notwithstanding his busy schedule, Meschian managed to give yet another concert tour in 2009. He performed in Yerevan, Moscow, and Pasadena LA. In 2015, architect Meschian finishes yet another project. This time, he designs and conceives the first newly built museum of Komitas in Yerevan, Armenia

In 2011, Arthur Meschian is awarded with the Mesrop Mashtots Medal. In 2012, Meschian is awarded with the golden medal of the office of public construction in Yerevan, Armenia. In 2013, he is awarded with the national accolade of the Armenian Republic for his Matenataran project. As of now, despite his huge musical success, Meschian is not in a hurry to present his new musical creations.

== Discography ==
In 1975, Apostles recorded the Requiem album, dedicated to the memory of the Armenian genocide victims. The Soviet recording studio Melodiya refused to release the album.

- "The Monologue of an insane violinist" (Khent jutakahari menakhosutyunn), 1992
- "Catharsis", 1991
- "Wander" (Taparum), 1995
- "Communion" (Haghordutyun), 1996
- "Live At Aram Khachatryan Concert Hall", 2005
- "Arthur Meschian Live 2006", 2006
