= Armenia national under-21 football team =

Armenia U-21
- Nickname: Yeritasardakan (youth team)
- Association: Football Federation of Armenia
- Head coach: Armen Gyulbudaghyants
- Captain: Misak Hakobyan
- Most caps: Misak Hakobyan (24)
- Top scorer: Henrikh Mkhitaryan (9)
First colours	Second colours

First international
- Belgium 7-0 Armenia (Ghent; September 6, 1994)

Biggest win
- Armenia 4-0 San Marino (Yerevan; June 9, 2006)

Biggest defeat
- Sweden 10-0 Armenia (Lublin, Poland; October 13, 2020)

UEFA U-21 Championship
- Appearances: none (first in n/a)
- Best result: 2nd in qual. group, 2007

The Armenia national under-21 football team is the youth football team of Armenia. The team is based mostly on the young players from the league and competes every two years in order to qualify for the European Under-21 Football Championship. The team played its first match in 1994, Armenia having until 1992 been part of the Soviet Union.

== UEFA U-21 record ==
- 1978 - 1991: part of Soviet Union
- 1992 - 1994: did not participate
- 1996: 6th of 6 in qualification group.
- 1998: 5th of 5 in qualification group.
- 2000: 5th of 5 in qualification group.
- 2002: 5th of 6 in qualification group.
- 2004: 5th of 5 in qualification group.
- 2006: 6th of 6 in qualification group.
- 2007: 2nd of 3 in qualification group.
- 2009: 4th of 5 in qualification group.
- 2011: 4th of 6 in qualification group.
- 2013: 2nd of 5 in qualification group.
- 2015: 4th of 5 in qualification group.
- 2017: 6th of 6 in qualification group.
- 2019: 4th of 6 in qualification group.
- 2021: 5th of 6 in qualification group.
- 2023: 6th of 6 in qualification group.
- 2025: 6th of 6 in qualification group.

== Managers ==
- Oganes Zanazanyan - From September 1994 - 1995
- Samvel Petrosyan - From 1996 - 1997
- Varuzhan Sukiasyan - From 1998 - 1999
- Armen Gyulbudaghyants - From 2000 - 2002
- Andranik Adamyan - From 2002 - 2003
- Mihai Stoica - From 2003 - August 2004
- Vardan Minasyan - From August 2004 – 2005
- Samvel Petrosyan - From 2005 - 2007
- Varuzhan Sukiasyan - From 2007 - 2008
- Flemming Serritslev - From March 2009 - June 30, 2011
- Rafael Nazaryan - From 2011- October 22, 2013
- Abraham Khashmanyan - October 22, 2013 - November 30, 2014
- Sargis Hovsepyan - December 1, 2014 - June 5, 2015
- Artak Oseyan - June 6, 2015 - November 26, 2015
- Karen Barseghyan - January 11, 2016 - October 28, 2016
- Artur Voskanyan - May 1, 2017 - June 30, 2018
- Armen Gyulbudaghyants - July 1, 2018 - October 6, 2018
- Antonio Jesus Flores - February 12, 2019 - October 14, 2020
- Rafael Nazaryan - October 19, 2020 - September 9, 2023
- Narek Azatyan (interim) - October, 2023 - November, 2023
- Tiran Ghazaryan (interim) - November, 2023 - December, 2023
- Armen Gyulbudaghyants - December 8, 2023 -

== Players ==
=== Current squad ===
- UEFA European U-21 Championship 2027
- Match dates: October 1 and 5, 2026
- Opposition: Italy and Montenegro
- Caps and goals correct as of: 5 October 2026, after the match against Montenegro

No.	Pos.	Player	Date of birth (age)	Caps	Goals	Club
1	GK	Davit Davtyan	27 July 2005 (age 21)	1	0	(Football Federation of Armenia) Gandzasar
12	GK	Hayk Ghazaryan	19 September 2006 (age 20)	4	0	(Football Federation of Armenia) BKMA
	GK	Hunan Gyurjinyan	16 January 2005 (age 21)	0	0	(Football Federation of Armenia) Van
2	DF	Alyosha Khachatryan	13 May 2006 (age 20)	2	0	(Football Federation of Armenia) BKMA
4	DF	Armen Sargsyan	20 February 2004 (age 22)	2	0	(Football Federation of Armenia) Sardarapat
5	DF	Petik Manukyan	21 February 2006 (age 20)	13	0	(Football Federation of Armenia) Urartu
6	DF	Davit Dokhoyan	12 February 2008 (age 18)	1	0	(Football Federation of Armenia) BKMA
14	DF	Poghos Krmzyan	16 August 2004 (age 22)	7	0	(Football Federation of Armenia) BKMA
19	DF	Suren Tsarukyan	19 August 2005 (age 21)	10	0	(Football Federation of Armenia) Shirak
20	DF	Stepan Gigolyan	20 January 2006 (age 20)	0	0	(Football Federation of Armenia) Alashkert
	DF	Andranik Hakobyan	4 October 2005 (age 21)	7	0	Free Agent
8	MF	Michel Ayvazyan	21 June 2005 (age 21)	7	0	(Football Federation of Armenia) Ararat-Armenia
10	MF	Davit Hakobyan	9 August 2005 (age 21)	12	3	(Football Federation of Armenia) Pyunik
13	MF	Hamlet Sargsyan	20 May 2004 (age 22)	17	0	(Football Federation of Armenia) BKMA
21	MF	Artur Askaryan	26 April 2006 (age 20)	8	0	(Football Federation of Armenia) BKMA
23	MF	David Kirakosyan	13 July 2006 (age 20)	6	0	(Russian Football Union) Spartak Kostroma
	MF	Aram Aslanyan	17 March 2005 (age 21)	1	0	(Football Federation of Armenia) Ararat Yerevan
	MF	Vazgen Sargsyan	11 December 2004 (age 21)	0	0	(Football Federation of Armenia) Shirak
	MF	Vyacheslav Afyan	28 February 2005 (age 21)	9	1	(Football Federation of Armenia) Pyunik
7	FW	Misak Hakobyan (captain)	11 June 2004 (age 22)	24	1	(Football Federation of Armenia) Sardarapat
9	FW	Edik Vardanyan	25 March 2005 (age 21)	12	1	(Football Federation of Armenia) Urartu
11	FW	David Harutyunyan	2 August 2007 (age 19)	3	0	(Football Federation of Armenia) BKMA
15	FW	Sergey Manukyan	3 April 2004 (age 22)	0	0	(Football Federation of Armenia) Shirak
17	FW	Petros Alekyan	25 December 2005 (age 20)	3	0	(Football Federation of Armenia) Ararat Yerevan
22	FW	Davit Davtyan	10 June 2008 (age 18)	2	0	(Football Federation of Armenia) BKMA
	FW	Arayik Eloyan	16 March 2004 (age 22)	9	0	(Football Federation of Armenia) Ararat-Armenia

=== Recent call-ups ===
Players that have been called up within the past 12 months.

Pos.	Player	Date of birth (age)	Caps	Goals	Club	Latest call-up
GK	Gor Matinyan	23 June 2004 (age 22)	19	0	(Armenia) Sardarapat	v. North Macedonia, 31 March 2026
DF	Mher Kankanyan	19 March 2004 (age 22)	0	0	(Armenia) Gandzasar	v. Poland, 27 March 2026
DF	Mark Avetisyan	24 June 2005 (age 21)	6	0	(Armenia) Noah	v. North Macedonia, 31 March 2026
DF	Mher Tarloyan	7 March 2005 (age 21)	8	0	(Armenia) Shirak	v. Poland, 27 March 2026
DF	Tigran Sumbulyan	27 December 2004 (age 21)	0	0	(Armenia) Shirak	v. Poland, 27 March 2026
MF	Levon Bashoyan	15 September 2005 (age 21)	4	1	(Armenia) Urartu	v. Italy, 1 October 2026 ^{INJ}
MF	Edgar Piloyan	7 November 2004 (age 21)	12	0	(Armenia) Alashkert	v. Italy, 1 October 2026 ^{INJ}
MF	Narek Janoyan	28 October 2005 (age 21)	3	0	(Armenia) Shirak	v. Poland, 27 March 2026
MF	Vadim Harutyunyan	8 September 2005 (age 21)	1	0	(Belarus) Dnepr Mogilev	v. North Macedonia, 31 March 2026
MF	Karlen Hovhannisyan	26 April 2005 (age 21)	11	0	(Russia) Akron Tolyatti	v. Sweden, 18 November 2025
MF	Narek Hovhannisyan	6 August 2006 (age 20)	10	1	(Poland) Lechia Gdańsk	v. Sweden, 18 November 2025
MF	Yervand Sukiasyan	25 February 2005 (age 21)	3	1	Free Agent	v. Sweden, 18 November 2025
FW	Finn Geragusyan	28 October 2007 (age 19)	2	0	(England) Sunderland U21	v. Sweden, 18 November 2025
FW	Artur Gharibyan	29 July 2006 (age 20)	4	0	(Russia) Rodina Moscow	v. Sweden, 18 November 2025

== UEFA Euro U-21 qualification ==
=== 2027 UEFA European Under-21 Championship qualification Group E ===
==== Standings ====
Pos	Team	Pld	W	D	L	GF	GA	GD	Pts	Qualification	Italy	Poland	Sweden	Montenegro	North Macedonia	Armenia
1	Italy	10	9	0	1	32	7	+25	27 (Note: Tied on head-to-head points (3). Head-to-head goal difference: Italy +3, Poland −3.)	Final tournament	—	6–2	4–0	2–1	4–0	5–1
2	Poland	10	9	0	1	28	8	+20	27	Final tournament	2–1	—	3–0	2–0	3–0	4–1
3	Sweden	10	4	1	5	12	22	−10	13		0–4	0–6	—	2–2	2–0	3–0
4	Montenegro	10	3	3	4	13	16	−3	12		1–4	0–1	2–0	—	3–2	1–1
5	North Macedonia	10	2	1	7	8	20	−12	7		0–1	0–1	1–4	1–1	—	2–1
6	Armenia	10	0	1	9	5	25	−20	1		0–1	0–4	0–1	1–2	0–2	—

Source: UEFA
Rules for classification: Tiebreakers

== See also ==
- Armenia national football team
- Armenia national under-19 football team
- Armenia national under-17 football team
