= Alain Manoukian =

French fashion designer (born 1946)

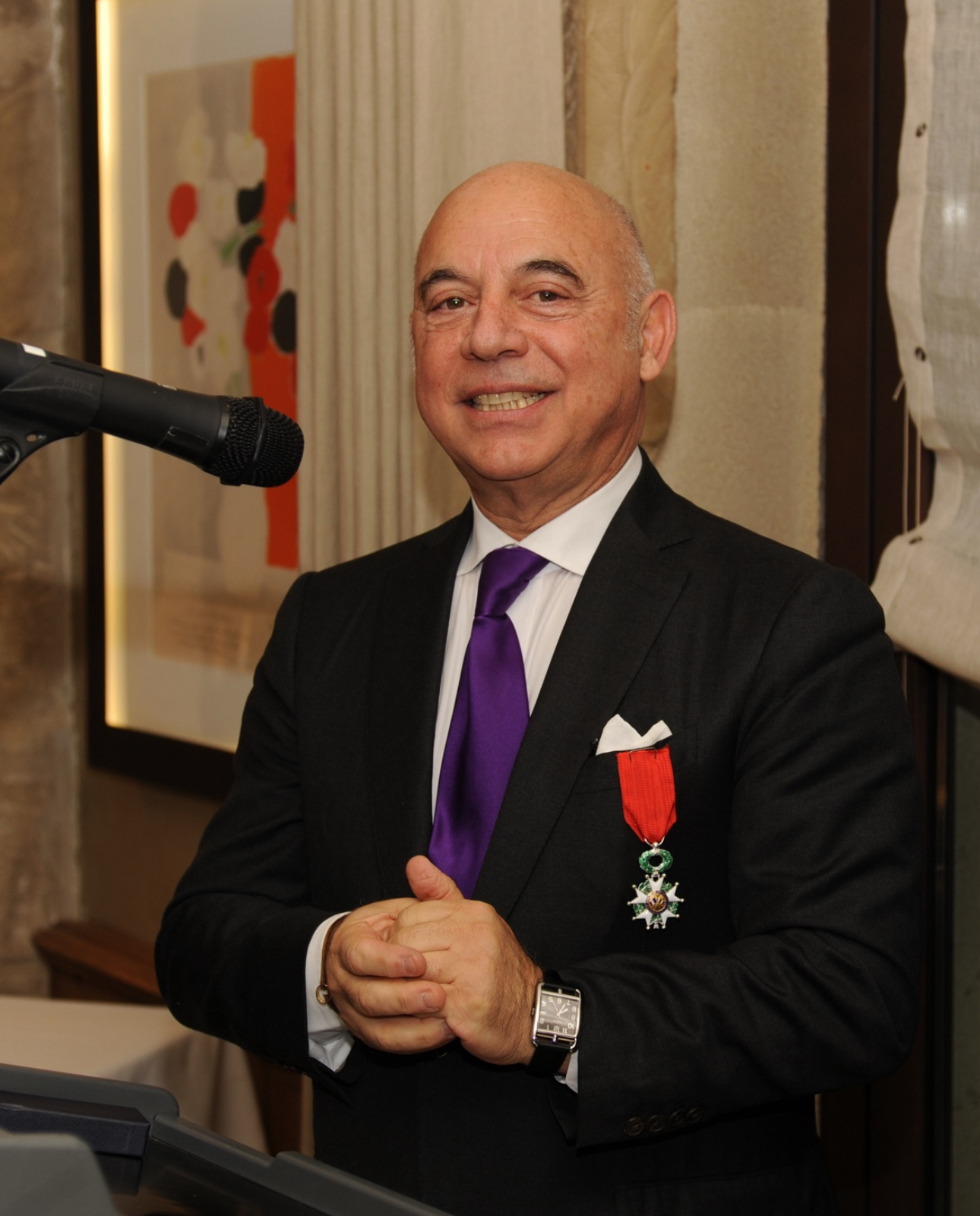
- Alain Manoukian receiving the Legion of Honour awarded on the 14th of July 2011 by Christine Lagarde, President of the European Central Bank.
- Born: February 19, 1946 (age 80); Marseille, France
- Occupations: Businessman, entrepreneur
- Spouse: Dany Manoukian
- Children: David Manoukian, Seda Manoukian
- Awards: Officer of the National Order of Merit (1980); Knight of the Legion of Honour (2011)
- Website: mnkholdings.lu

Alain Manoukian (Armenian: Ալեն Մանուկյան, born 19 February 1946) is a French fashion designer and owner of the Manoukian fashion group. Manoukian began his career in the fashion industry in 1972. Established as a franchise in 1979, the company eventually opened 700 stores throughout the world, 300 of which were in France. After the Manoukian company was sold in 2005 to BCBG, Alain Manoukian now heads the MNK Holdings private investment group based in Luxembourg.

== Early life ==
Alain Manoukian was born to Armenian parents in Marseille, France, on 19 February 1946. His grandparents, along with his father, arrived in France from Aleppo, Syria in 1927. The family was originally from Kharpert and during the Armenian genocide, they were deported to Syria. During the deportations, Manoukian's father lost six siblings. The family managed to emigrate to France with the help of the Nansen Passport. When living in Marseille, Manoukian's parents were involved with shoe-making.

== Career ==
Alain Manoukian's first store was opened in 1972 with the help of his wife, Danielle Manoukian. The store mostly featured sweater designs. In 1979, the company became a franchise and in 1984, it began to expand worldwide. In 1985, the company went public and was listed on the Euronext Paris Stock Exchange through an IPO led by Lazard, with the family retaining an 89% majority stake.

During the 1988 Armenian earthquake, Manoukian was one of the first to send relief supplies. The relief supplies required four airplanes to have it delivered. In honor of his father, he sponsored the construction of an Armenian church next to Lake Sevan.

By 1990, the company eventually opened four-hundred fifty stores throughout the world, three hundred of which were in France, and was worth $140 million.

In 2001, Manoukian launched two websites: one included an e-commerce section with seven hundred clothing items for sale, making it Europe’s first fashion e-commerce platform, while the second was a B2B corporate website aimed at investors. A year later, in 2002, the company started the Seda Manoukian brand which appeals to the youth market. At this time, Alain Manoukian had a network of more than 700 stores, including those operated directly by the group as well as affiliated and franchised locations, and was distributed in over 3,000 points of sale across 28 countries (including corners in department stores and multi-brand shops).

In 2005, the Manoukian family sold the business to the American fashion group BCBG Max Azria. The transaction, structured around a $300 million acquisition, was led by Goldman Sachs and Citigroup, which launched a $300 million financing package comprising a five-year $100 million asset-based loan and a six-year $200 million term loan.

His son, David Manoukian is the founder, chairman, and chief executive officer of the luxury social network service The Sphere.

== Distinctions ==
Some of Alain Manoukian's distinctions include:

- National Order of Merit
- Chevalier of the Legion of Honor
