= Yuri Manukyan =

Armenian politician (1940–2013)

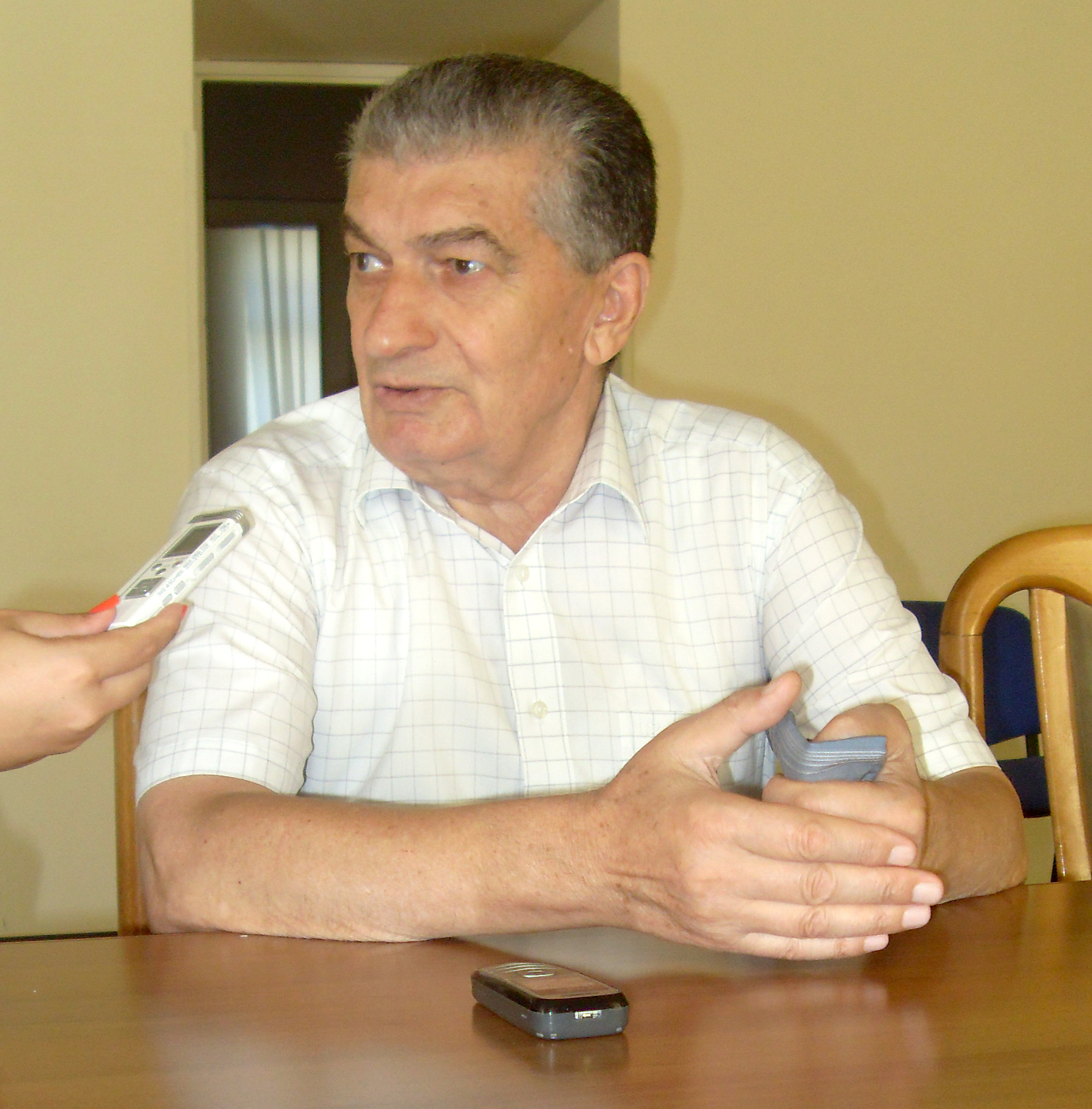
- Yuri Manukyan in the year prior to his death, September 2012.
- Born: 3 January 1940; Yerevan, Armenian Soviet Socialist Republic
- Died: 7 February 2013 (aged 73); Yerevan, Armenia
- Education: Armenian State Pedagogical University
- Occupations: Politician, teacher and mathematician

Yuri Avakovovich Manukyan (3 January 1940 – 7 February 2013; Armenian: Յուրի Ավագի Մանուկյան), was a Soviet and Armenian politician and statesman.

== Personal life and career ==
Yuri Manukyan was born in Yerevan on the Armenian Soviet Socialist Republic, on 3 January 1940.

Yuri was a laborer at the Yerevan Crystal Factory between 1957 and 1959.

He graduated from the Armenian State Pedagogical University in 1963. He became a pedagogue-mathematician.

He was the First Secretary of the District Committee of the All-Union Leninist Young Communist League of Vedi between 1965 and 1968.

Between 1968 and 1970 he was Head of the Sector of the Central Committee of the LKSM of Armenia. From 1970 to 1975 he was the director of the youth tourist complex.

Manukyan was the Director of Yerevan School No. 59 from 1975 to 1983.

From 1983 and 1991 he was Head of the Public Education Department of Spandaryan district. On 30 May 1999 he was elected as a deputy of the National Assembly of Armenia.

After the USSR's collapse in 1991 and Armenia's independence declaration on 23 August 1990, Yuri Manukyan became the First Secretary of the Spandaryan District Committee of the Armenian Communist Party. He served on the Parliamentary Assembly of the Council of Europe for Armenia from 23 April 2001 to 21 January 2002.

Yuri Manukyan died on 7 February 2013, aged 73, in Yerevan, Armenia.
