= Armenia national football team =

Men's association football team representing Armenia

Armenia
- Nickname: Հավաքական (Havakakan)
- Association: Football Federation of Armenia (FFA)
- Confederation: UEFA (Europe)
- Head coach: Yegishe Melikyan
- Captain: Eduard Spertsyan
- Most caps: Sargis Hovsepyan (132)
- Top scorer: Henrikh Mkhitaryan (32)
- Home stadium: Vazgen Sargsyan Republican Stadium
- FIFA code: ARM
First colours	Second colours

FIFA ranking
- Current: 110 ▼2 (18 November 2026)
- Highest: 30 (February 2014)
- Lowest: 159 (July 1994)

First international
- Official; Armenia 0–0 Moldova (Yerevan, Armenia; 14 October 1992)

Biggest win
- Armenia 7–1 Guatemala (Los Angeles, United States; 28 May 2016)

Biggest defeat
- Norway 9–0 Armenia (Oslo, Norway; 29 March 2022)

The Armenia national football team (Armenian: Հայաստանի ֆուտբոլի ազգային հավաքական) represents Armenia in men's international football, and is controlled by the Football Federation of Armenia, the governing body for football in Armenia.

After gaining independence from the Soviet Union, the team played its first international match on 12 October 1992. The national team has participated in the qualification of every major tournament from the UEFA Euro 1996 onwards, though they are yet to qualify for the final stages of either a UEFA European Football Championship or a FIFA World Cup. The team's main achievements have been third-place finish in the UEFA Euro 2012 qualifying stage, and being promoted to the 2022–23 UEFA Nations League B.

The primary training ground is at the Technical Center-Academy of the Football Federation of Armenia in the northern Avan District of the capital Yerevan, and the team plays their home matches at the Republican Stadium.

== History ==
Oldest records of football teams in Soviet Armenia go back to 1926, when the Transcaucasian Championship was organized in Tbilisi, Georgia, with all three South Caucasian countries participating.

Until Armenia became an independent state in 1991, players from the Armenian Soviet Socialist Republic were playing for the Soviet Union national football team. After independence, the Football Federation of Armenia was founded on 18 January 1992 and established relations with FIFA in 1992 and with UEFA in 1993. The history of the Armenia national team began on 14 October 1992, when Armenia played its first match against Moldova. That meeting ended in a goalless draw. Since 1996, the team has been a member of qualifiers European and World Championships. Armenia has competed in every UEFA European Championship qualifying and FIFA World Cup qualification since 1994.

The first head coach of the Armenian national squad was Soviet Armenian football star Eduard Markarov. Armenian winner of the UEFA Jubilee Awards and fellow Soviet Armenian football great Khoren Oganesian also became a head coach. Many of the early coaches of the national team never stayed for longer than two years. Scottish coach Ian Porterfield became head coach in 2006 and began to lead the team to some of its first international successes. Under his leadership, the Armenian team played a series of great matches with victories over Kazakhstan 2–1, Poland 1–0 and a draw with Portugal (1–1), with Cristiano Ronaldo in the lineup. But then tragedy struck; the 62-year-old Porterfield died of cancer, leaving his work unfinished. An acting assistant coach, Vardan Minasyan, became acting head coach following Porterfield's death. Minasyan learned much from Porterfield and Samvel Darbinyan, another former head coach of Armenia, during this time about coaching and managing. On 10 February 2009, after the draw for the qualifying round teams of the UEFA Euro 2012, by order of the President of the Football Federation of Armenia Ruben Hayrapetyan, Minasyan continued to lead the Armenian national squad, only now as the official head coach.

In the UEFA Euro 2012 qualifying matches, Minasyan led Armenia in Group B against Russia, Slovakia, Ireland, Macedonia and Andorra. Armenia, considered a heavy underdog, defeated the group favorite Slovakia with two crushing defeats 4–0 and 3–1, defeated Andorra in two matches as well 4–0 and 3–0, drew with Macedonia 2–2 and defeated them in the deciding match 4–1 and tied with the group winners Russia 0–0. The Armenian team scored the most goals out of Group B, with a total of 22. Henrikh Mkhitaryan of Armenia scored 6 goals, the most goals scored by a single player in Group B. The national team almost made the final draw, but controversially lost in a decisive match against Ireland 1–2. Armenian goalkeeper Roman Berezovsky was given a red card by Spanish referee Eduardo Gonzalez in the 26th-minute for supposedly touching the ball outside the goal area. However, replays clearly showed the ball touched his chest and never touched his hands. Replays also showed that Ireland striker Simon Cox had actually touched the ball with his right hand. Despite this, Gonzalez did not penalize Cox, who would later admit he touched the ball with his hand. Had Cox's offence been punished, Armenia would have been awarded a free-kick. Edgar Malakyan was swapped for replacement goalkeeper Arsen Petrosyan. Valeri Aleksanyan later accidentally scored an own goal past Petrosyan, which ended up deciding the match. Armenia and Ireland would each score another goal. The Football Federation of Armenia unsuccessfully filed a protest over the match. Gonzalez had later resigned after the match. Despite not getting to play in the UEFA Euro 2012, Minasyan brought the Armenia national team to a record #41 FIFA ranking, placed the team in a personal best third place in the group stage and went on to become the longest leading head coach of the Armenia football team. Minasyan stated he was proud of the entire team. They were all welcomed in the airport back in Armenia as heroes.

After the incredible UEFA Euro 2012 run, the 2014 World Cup and Euro 2016 qualifiers were not successful, with the Armenian side stood near bottom in the 2014 World Cup run and even finished last without a single win in Euro 2016 campaign. Armenia salvaged some few pride in 2018 World Cup qualification when the Armenians managed to create a shocking 3–2 home win over Montenegro, which contributed to Montenegro's failure to qualify for the 2018 FIFA World Cup. After these disappointments, Vardan Minasyan returned to lead Armenia in the 2018–19 UEFA Nations League D, but finished behind Macedonia, including a humiliating 0–1 home loss to Gibraltar. Due to this humiliation, Minasyan was sacked and Armen Gyulbudaghyants was appointed new coach of Armenian side. The Armenians participated in the UEFA Euro 2020 qualifying along with giants Italy, Bosnia and Herzegovina, former European champions Greece, Finland and Liechtenstein. Armenia lost two opening fixtures to Bosnia 1–2 away and Finland 0–2 at home, and was supposed to get eliminated pretty early. However, Armenia began their resurgence following these losses, with a convincing 3–0 home cruise to Liechtenstein before managed to create a shocking 3–2 away win over Greece, former UEFA Euro 2004 champions. Armenia suffered a minor setback after losing at home to powerhouse Italy 1–3, before created another shock in their qualification with a 4–2 convincing win over Bosnia and Herzegovina in the same ground. Armenia was pulled back to the ground when they faced Greece, Finland and Italy in their games, with Armenia defeated in both games and eventually finished fifth in their group, failed to qualify for UEFA Euro 2020.

Armenia participated in the 2020–21 UEFA Nations League C and was seen as a minnow in a group containing strong North Macedonia and Georgia, along with fellow minnow Estonia. Armenia began with a 1–2 loss to North Macedonia away, before bounded back with an encouraging 2–0 home win to Estonia in September 2020. In October, Armenia had to play their designated "home game" away from their country in Poland due to the Second Nagorno-Karabakh War, and disappointed with only a 2–2 draw to Georgia and 1–1 draw to Estonia, thus leaving impression that Armenia would flounder from the chance to get promotion. Yet, in November the same year, despite having to play away from home, and without their talisman and captain Henrikh Mkhitaryan, Armenia managed what would be the country's greatest comeback in the history, beating Georgia right in Tbilisi 2–1 before stunned the Fyromians, who had qualified for Euro 2020, 1–0, in their designated home game in Cyprus. These wins had not just ensured Armenia's promotion to 2022–23 UEFA Nations League B, but it also meant Armenia could be the first Caucasus country to get a FIFA World Cup playoff ticket. Moreover, the League B season in 2022–23 could also ensure Armenia a playoff place for the UEFA Euro 2024.

Armenia participated in the 2022 World Cup qualification and was seen weak to the group containing strong Germany, Iceland, Romania and North Macedonia. Armenia started with a difficult 1–0 win to Liechtenstein away, leaving yet again an impression that Armenia would just end up being mopped by the remainders. However, Armenia stunned both Iceland and Romania on their home fixtures 2–0 and 3–2 to top the group for the first time ever, raising the country's hopes of qualifying for an improbable maiden World Cup. Ultimately however, Armenia's campaign ended in bitter disappointment as they failed to win a single one of their remaining seven qualifying games, finding themselves on the end of a 6-0 trashing by Germany and even being held to a 1–1 draw at home by lowly Liechtenstein. Armenia finished a distant fourth place in the group, ahead of Liechtenstein and an underwhelming Iceland side but six points behind playoff-bound North Macedonia and even five points behind third-placed Romania.

== Stadium ==
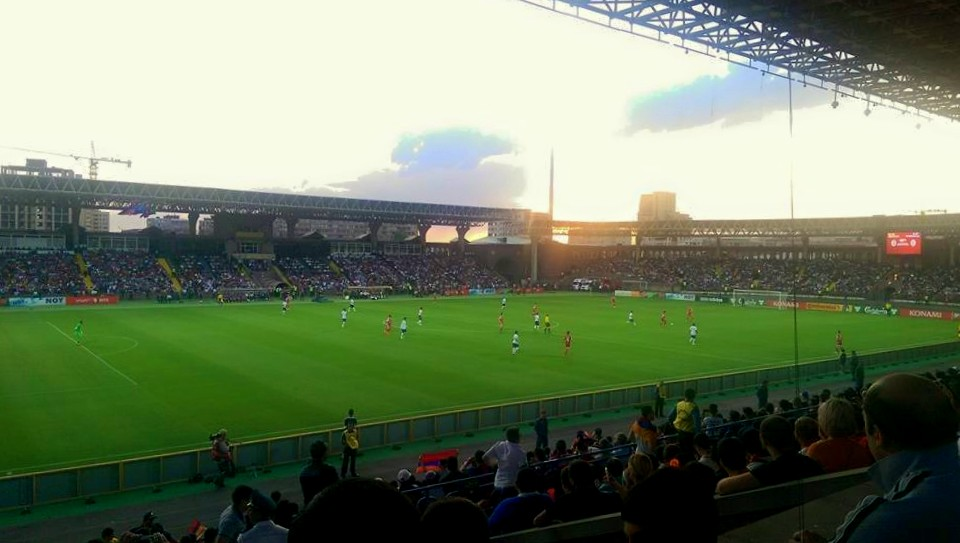
Armenia vs Portugal during a UEFA Euro 2016 qualifying match at the Republican Stadium in Yerevan

Hrazdan Stadium was built from 1969 to 1970 on Athens St., Kentron in a period of 18 months with the financial support of the oil magnate Calouste Gulbenkian Foundation. A total amount of 5 million rubles was allocated for Hrazdan. The stadium was named after the slope of the Hrazdan River. It is the largest stadium in Armenia, with more than 70,000 seats. The opening of the stadium took place on 29 November 1970. The Armenia national team played home matches in Hrazdan until 2000. Several Armenian football clubs also played in Hrazdan. In Soviet times, it was one of the largest stadiums in the Soviet Union (among the top four) and one of the few double-tiered stadiums. Hrazdan was the football ground stadium for Ararat Yerevan. Hrazdan Stadium hosted its first official football match on 19 May 1971 when Ararat Yerevan defeated Kairat 3–0 in front of a record 78,000 spectators. The stadium would host Ararat Yerevan for the final victory of the club in the 1973 Soviet Top League and in the 1973 and 1975 Soviet Cup. The Soviet Union national football team played only two matches at the stadium, both of which date back to 1978. In April of that year, in a friendly game against Finland, the USSR won 10–2. Six months later, in a qualifying match for the UEFA Euro 1980 against Greece the Soviet team won again 2–0. The match with Finland hosted 12,000 spectators and the match with Greece hosted 40,000. The capacity of the stadium decreased from 70,000 to an all-seater of 53,849 spectators. By the second half of 2012, Hrazdan was completely renovated to become the regular venue of the national team's home matches.

The Republican Stadium was renovated in 1999 and, since 2000, has been the home ground for Armenia. The stadium was built in 1953 and finished within a year's time. Republican Stadium has a capacity of 14,968. During the Soviet period and onward from 1953 to 1999, it was known as Dinamo Stadium. The stadium had its official name changed to "Republican Stadium named after Vazgen Sargsyan" in 1999, after Armenian war hero and former Prime Minister of Armenia Vazgen Sargsyan, who died that year. Local clubs Pyunik and Ulisses play home matches at the Republican Stadium. In 2008, the stadium went under a large-scale development in order to modernize the playing surface and to create a high level VIP section and other facilities which met UEFA standards.

Armenia played a match in Hrazdan in 2008 against Turkey after partial renovation earlier that year. The number of seats decreased from 75,000 to 53,849. It is planned to hold Armenia's home matches after a complete renovation in 2012. On 12 October 2012, Armenia played a 2014 FIFA World Cup qualification match against Italy, but has not used Hrazdan since. Hrazdan is used mostly for Armenian football clubs and a number of other athletic competitions.

== Team image ==
=== Jerseys and colour ===
Armenia's first kit, used in a 1992 friendly match against Moldova was a white-blue-black Erima jersey with the country's name written in Armenian across the chest. Armenia's next matches were in 1994, the team wore orange as home colours and white as away, from Puma. After using a mix of Adidas and Puma kits through the 1990's, Armenia signed their first long term kit contract with Italian sportswear company Lotto in 2000, wearing red at home and white away.

The home gear color were previously the Red-Blue-Orange Armenian tricolour, designed by Stepan Malkhasyants. All three colors were on the first Armenia national team jerseys issued. The definition of the colors, as stated in government website, is:

The Red emblematizes the Armenian Highland, the Armenian people's continued struggle for survival, maintenance of the Orthodox Christian faith, Armenia's independence and freedom. The Blue emblematizes the will of the people of Armenia to live beneath peaceful skies. The Orange emblematizes the creative talent and hard-working nature of the people of Armenia.

In the Euro 2012 qualification matches, played in 2010 and 2011, Armenia's home colors were red-blue-red, produced by Hummel. Beginning with the May 2012 friendly with Greece, Armenia switched to all-red home colours and an all-white away kit produced by Adidas.

In 2018, Armenia switched kit providers to Macron through the UEFA kit assistance scheme, a program to support Europe’s smaller associations who do not necessarily have bargaining power when negotiating with kit suppliers. Armenia chose to stay with Macron as their supplier after the kit assistance scheme contract shifted from Macron to Erreà in 2022. In 2023, Armenia extended their partnership with Macron until 2029.

Armenia's current home kit is burgendy red with gold trim and has stylised bird forms, based on illuminated letters from medieval Armenian manuscripts. The away is white with red trim, with a pattern inspired by the elaborate ornamental motifs found in the margins and decorative sections of Armenian manuscripts. The third kit is blue, with a design inspired by Lake Sevan.

=== Kit suppliers ===
Kit provider	Period
(Germany) Erima	1992
(Germany) Puma	1994–1999
(Germany) Adidas	1999
(Italy) Lotto	2000–2003
(Denmark) Hummel	2004–2011
(Germany) Adidas	2012–2017
(Italy) Macron	2018–present

== Results and fixtures ==
The following is a list of match results in the last 12 months, as well as any future matches that have been scheduled.

Win Draw Loss Fixture

=== 2026 ===
26 March 2026 Friendly	United Arab Emirates	Cancelled	Armenia	Abu Dhabi, United Arab Emirates
Note: Match cancelled due to the 2026 Iran war.

29 March 2026 Friendly	Armenia	1–2	Belarus	Yerevan, Armenia
18:00 UTC+4	Bichakhchyan 88' (pen.)	Report	Yablonsky 8'; Tiknizyan 72' (o.g.)	Stadium: Vazgen Sargsyan Republican Stadium; Attendance: 11,483; Referee: Dumitru Muntean (Moldova)

6 June 2026 Friendly	Armenia	1–1	Kazakhstan	Yerevan, Armenia
18:00 UTC+4	Spertsyan 54'	Report	Samorodov 50'	Stadium: Vazgen Sargsyan Republican Stadium; Attendance: 8,400; Referee: Kyriakos Athanasiou (Cyprus)

9 June 2026 Friendly	Armenia	1–1	Moldova	Yerevan, Armenia
19:00 UTC+4	Serobyan 89'	Report	Bogaciuc 90+1'	Stadium: Vazgen Sargsyan Republican Stadium; Attendance: 6,000; Referee: Aleko Aptsiauri (Georgia)

25 September 2026 2026–27 Nations League	Armenia	2–0	Latvia	Yerevan, Armenia
20:00 UTC+4	Arutyunyan 31'; Gharibyan 75'	Report		Stadium: Vazgen Sargsyan Republican Stadium; Attendance: 11,093; Referee: Martin Matoša (Slovenia)

28 September 2026 2026–27 Nations League	Armenia	2–3	Montenegro	Yerevan, Armenia
20:00 UTC+4	Serobyan 34'; Spertsyan 65'	Report	Piloyan 20' (o.g.); Krstović 38'; Latković 89'	Stadium: Vazgen Sargsyan Republican Stadium; Attendance: 11,400; Referee: José Luis Munuera Montero (Spain)

2 October 2026 2026–27 Nations League	Cyprus	2–0	Armenia	Nicosia, Cyprus
21:45 UTC+3	Konomis 19'; Kakoullis 31'	Report		Stadium: GSP Stadium; Attendance: 3,456; Referee: Mohammad Al-Emara (Finland)

5 October 2026 2026–27 Nations League	Montenegro	0–0	Armenia	Podgorica, Montenegro
20:45 UTC+2		Report		Stadium: Podgorica City Stadium; Attendance: 9,700; Referee: Manfredas Lukjančukas (Lithuania)

12 November 2026 2026–27 Nations League	Armenia	1–1	Cyprus	Yerevan, Armenia
21:00 UTC+4	Garibyan 58'	Report	Pikis 9'	Stadium: Vazgen Sargsyan Republican Stadium; Attendance: 7,000; Referee: Orel Grinfeld (Israel)

15 November 2026 2026–27 Nations League	Latvia	0–0	Armenia	Riga, Latvia
15:00 UTC+2		Report		Stadium: Skonto Stadium; Attendance: 5,355; Referee: Vasilios Fotias (Greece)

== Managers ==
=== Current coaching staff ===
Position	Name
Head coach	(Armenia) Yeghishe Melikyan
Assistant coach	(Ukraine) Roman Monaryov
Assistant coach	(Armenia) Aghvan Ayvazyan
Goalkeeping coach	(Armenia) Stepan Demirchyan
Fitness coach	(Serbia) Predrag Božič

=== List of managers ===
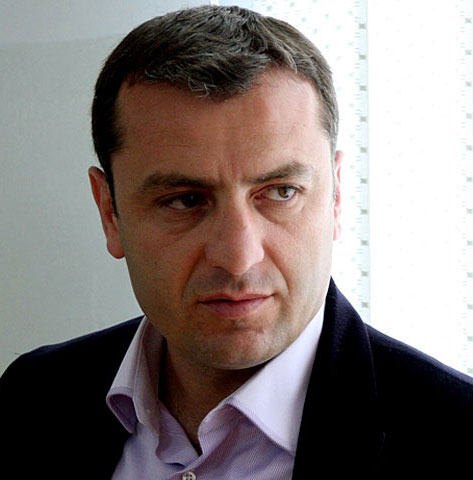
Vardan Minasyan, previously held the position from 2009 to 2014 and again briefly in 2018, the longest period of time.

As of match played 15 November 2026

Manager	Period	Pld	Won	Tied	Lost	GF	GA	Win %
(Armenia) Eduard Markarov	1992–1994	6	1	2	3	1	5	16.67
(Armenia) Samvel Darbinyan	1995–1996	9	1	1	7	5	21	11.11
(Armenia) Khoren Hovhannisyan	1996–1997	16	2	5	9	10	41	12.5
(Armenia) Souren Barseghyan	1998–1999	14	4	2	8	11	19	28.57
(Armenia) Varuzhan Sukiasyan	2000–2001	17	3	7	7	17	27	17.65
(Armenia) Andranik Adamyan (caretaker)	2002	1	1	0	0	2	0	100
(Argentina) Oscar López	2002	2	0	1	1	2	4	0
(Armenia) Andranik Adamyan (caretaker)	2003	1	0	0	1	0	2	0
(Romania) Mihai Stoichiță	2003–2004	10	4	1	5	11	17	40
(France) Bernard Casoni	2004–2005	8	1	1	6	5	18	12.5
(Netherlands) Henk Wisman	2005–2006	8	1	1	6	5	14	12.5
(Scotland) Ian Porterfield	2006–2007	10	2	4	4	5	9	20
(Armenia) Vardan Minasyan (caretaker) (England) Tom Jones (caretaker)	2007	6	1	1	4	2	8	16.67
(Denmark) Jan Poulsen	2008–2009	12	3	4	5	9	19	25
(Armenia) Vardan Minasyan	2009–2014	39	14	4	21	56	58	35.9
(Switzerland) Bernard Challandes	2014–2015	9	1	1	7	9	23	11.11
(Armenia) Sargis Hovsepyan (caretaker)	2015	4	0	1	3	2	9	0
(Armenia) Varuzhan Sukiasyan	2015–2016	7	2	1	4	12	12	28.57
(Armenia) Artur Petrosyan	2016–2018	10	5	1	4	21	21	50
(Armenia) Vardan Minasyan	2018	4	1	2	1	3	4	25
(Armenia) Armen Gyulbudaghyants	2018–2019	12	5	2	5	25	20	41.67
(Armenia) Abraham Khashmanyan	2019–2020	2	0	0	2	1	10	0
(Spain) Joaquín Caparrós	2020–2022	26	9	5	12	25	56	34.62
(Armenia) Roman Berezovsky (caretaker)	2022	2	0	1	1	2	4	0
(Ukraine) Oleksandr Petrakov	2023–2024	18	4	4	10	22	29	22.22
(Armenia) Suren Chakhalyan (caretaker)	2024	2	1	0	1	2	2	50
(Netherlands) John van 't Schip	2025	4	0	1	3	5	16	0
(Armenia) Yegishe Melikyan	2025–	15	2	5	8	11	29	13.33

== Players ==
=== Current squad ===
The following players were called up for the 2026–27 UEFA Nations League matches against Cyprus and Latvia on November 12 and 15.

- Caps and goals correct as of as of 15 November 2026, after the match against Latvia.

No.	Pos.	Player	Date of birth (age)	Caps	Goals	Club
1	GK	Ognjen Čančarević	25 September 1989 (age 37)	23	0	(Football Association of Serbia) IMT
12	GK	Gor Matinyan	23 June 2004 (age 22)	0	0	(Football Federation of Armenia) Sardarapat
16	GK	Aleksandr Mishiev	29 January 2004 (age 22)	3	0	(Football Federation of Armenia) Urartu
	GK	Arsen Beglaryan	18 February 1993 (age 33)	19	0	(Football Federation of Armenia) Alashkert
2	DF	Artyom Bandikyan	20 September 2005 (age 21)	7	0	(Russian Football Union) CSKA Moscow
3	DF	Erik Piloyan	29 January 2001 (age 25)	15	0	(Football Federation of Armenia) Urartu
4	DF	Georgy Arutyunyan	9 August 2004 (age 22)	37	1	(Hungarian Football Federation) Puskás Akadémia
5	DF	Styopa Mkrtchyan	17 February 2003 (age 23)	26	0	(German Football Association) 1. FC Nürnberg
13	DF	Arman Ghazaryan	24 July 2001 (age 25)	2	0	(Football Federation of Armenia) Urartu
19	DF	Edgar Grigoryan	25 August 1998 (age 28)	10	0	(Football Federation of Armenia) Ararat-Armenia
21	DF	Nair Tiknizyan	12 May 1999 (age 27)	37	1	(Hellenic Football Federation) Olympiacos
	DF	Argishti Petrosyan	16 October 1992 (age 34)	3	0	(Football Federation of Armenia) BKMA Yerevan
	DF	Khariton Ayvazyan	8 November 2003 (age 23)	0	0	(Football Federation of Armenia) Urartu
6	MF	Ugochukwu Iwu	28 October 1999 (age 27)	27	0	(Russian Football Union) Rubin Kazan
8	MF	Karlen Hovhannisyan	26 April 2005 (age 21)	8	0	(Russian Football Union) Akron Tolyatti
11	MF	Hovhannes Harutyunyan	25 May 1999 (age 27)	17	0	(Football Federation of Armenia) Pyunik
14	MF	Gor Manvelyan	9 April 2002 (age 24)	14	1	(Football Federation of Armenia) Noah
20	MF	Karen Muradyan	1 November 1992 (age 34)	14	0	(Football Federation of Armenia) Ararat-Armenia
	MF	Edgar Sevikyan	8 August 2001 (age 25)	25	2	(Royal Spanish Football Federation) Ceuta
	MF	Karen Nalbandyan	14 April 2002 (age 24)	3	0	(Football Federation of Armenia) Alashkert
	MF	Edgar Piloyan	11 July 2004 (age 22)	0	0	(Football Federation of Armenia) Alashkert
7	FW	Artur Garibyan	29 July 2006 (age 20)	5	2	(Russian Football Union) Rodina Moscow
9	FW	Artur Serobyan	2 July 2003 (age 23)	33	2	(Football Federation of Armenia) Ararat-Armenia
10	FW	Zhirayr Shaghoyan	10 April 2001 (age 25)	28	1	(Football Federation of Armenia) Ararat-Armenia
17	FW	Grant-Leon Ranos	20 July 2003 (age 23)	28	5	(Royal Spanish Football Federation) Tenerife
18	FW	Artur Miranyan	27 December 1995 (age 30)	25	1	(Israel Football Association) Ironi Tiberias
22	FW	Narek Grigoryan	17 June 2001 (age 25)	15	0	(Romanian Football Federation) Farul Constanța
23	FW	Narek Hovhannisyan	6 August 2006 (age 20)	8	0	(Polish Football Association) Lechia Gdańsk

=== Recent call-ups ===
The following players have been called up to the national team in the past 12 months but are not part of the current squad.

Pos.	Player	Date of birth (age)	Caps	Goals	Club	Latest call-up
GK	Henri Avagyan	16 January 1996 (age 30)	8	0	(Armenia) Pyunik	v. Moldova, 9 June 2026
GK	Arman Nersesyan	19 October 2001 (age 25)	0	0	Ararat-Armenia	v. Moldova, 9 June 2026
DF	Davit Terteryan	18 December 1997 (age 28)	12	0	(Armenia) Alashkert	v. Montenegro, 5 October 2026
DF	Erik Simonyan	12 June 2003 (age 23)	3	0	(Armenia) Pyunik	v. Montenegro, 5 October 2026
DF	Junior Bueno	3 September 1996 (age 30)	4	0	Ararat-Armenia	v. Montenegro, 28 September 2026 ^{INJ}
DF	Sergey Muradyan	27 August 2004 (age 22)	16	0	(Armenia) Noah	v. Latvia, 25 September 2026 ^{INJ}
DF	Kamo Hovhannisyan	5 October 1992 (age 34)	97	3	Ararat-Armenia	v. Moldova, 9 June 2026
DF	David Davidyan	14 December 1997 (age 28)	5	0	(Russia) Arsenal Tula	v. Moldova, 9 June 2026
DF	Arsen Sadoyan	16 March 1999 (age 27)	0	0	(Armenia) Alashkert	v. Belarus, 29 March 2026
MF	Eduard Spertsyan	7 June 2000 (age 26)	46	13	(Saudi Arabia) Al-Ahli	v. Montenegro, 5 October 2026
MF	Narek Aghasaryan	15 July 2001 (age 25)	3	0	(Armenia) Urartu	v. Montenegro, 5 October 2026
MF	Tigran Avanesyan	13 April 2002 (age 24)	5	0	(Uzbekistan) Dinamo Samarqand	v. Moldova, 9 June 2026
MF	Aram Khamoyan	10 January 2000 (age 26)	1	0	(Armenia) Noah	v. Moldova, 9 June 2026
MF	Artur Askaryan	26 April 2006 (age 20)	1	0	(Armenia) BKMA Yerevan	v. Belarus, 29 March 2026
FW	Arayik Eloyan	16 March 2004 (age 22)	4	0	Ararat-Armenia	v. Montenegro, 5 October 2026
FW	Davit Hakobyan	9 August 2005 (age 21)	0	0	(Armenia) Pyunik	v. Moldova, 9 June 2026
FW	Karen Melkonyan	25 March 1999 (age 27)	1	0	(Armenia) Urartu	v. Belarus, 29 March 2026
FW	Vahan Bichakhchyan	9 July 1999 (age 27)	47	6	(Poland) Legia Warsaw	v. Belarus, 29 March 2026
FW	Finn Geragusian	28 October 2007 (age 19)	1	0	(England) Sunderland U21	v. Belarus, 29 March 2026
Notes: ^{RET} = Retired from the national team; ^{INJ} = Player withdrew from the squad due to injury; ^{PRE} = Preliminary squad/standby

== Records ==
As of matched played 15 November 2026
Players in bold are still active with Armenia.

=== Most appearances ===
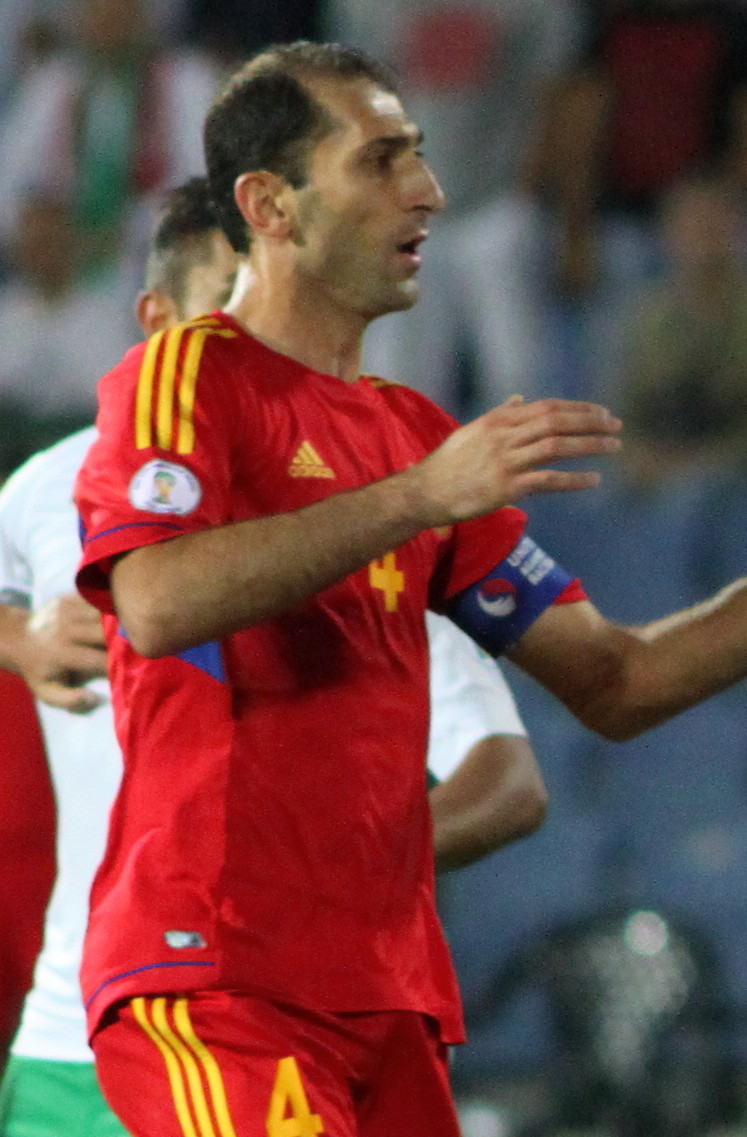
Sargis Hovsepyan is Armenia's most capped player with 132 appearances.

Rank	Player	Caps	Goals	Career
1	Sargis Hovsepyan	132	2	1992–2012
2	**Kamo Hovhannisyan**	97	3	2012–present
3	Henrikh Mkhitaryan	95	32	2007–2021
4	Roman Berezovsky	94	0	1996–2015
5	Varazdat Haroyan	92	4	2011–2025
6	Gevorg Ghazaryan	75	14	2007–2023
7	Robert Arzumanyan	74	5	2005–2015
8	Artur Petrosyan	69	11	1992–2004
9	Marcos Pizzelli	67	11	2008–2019
10	Tigran Barseghyan	64	9	2016–2025

=== Top goalscorers ===
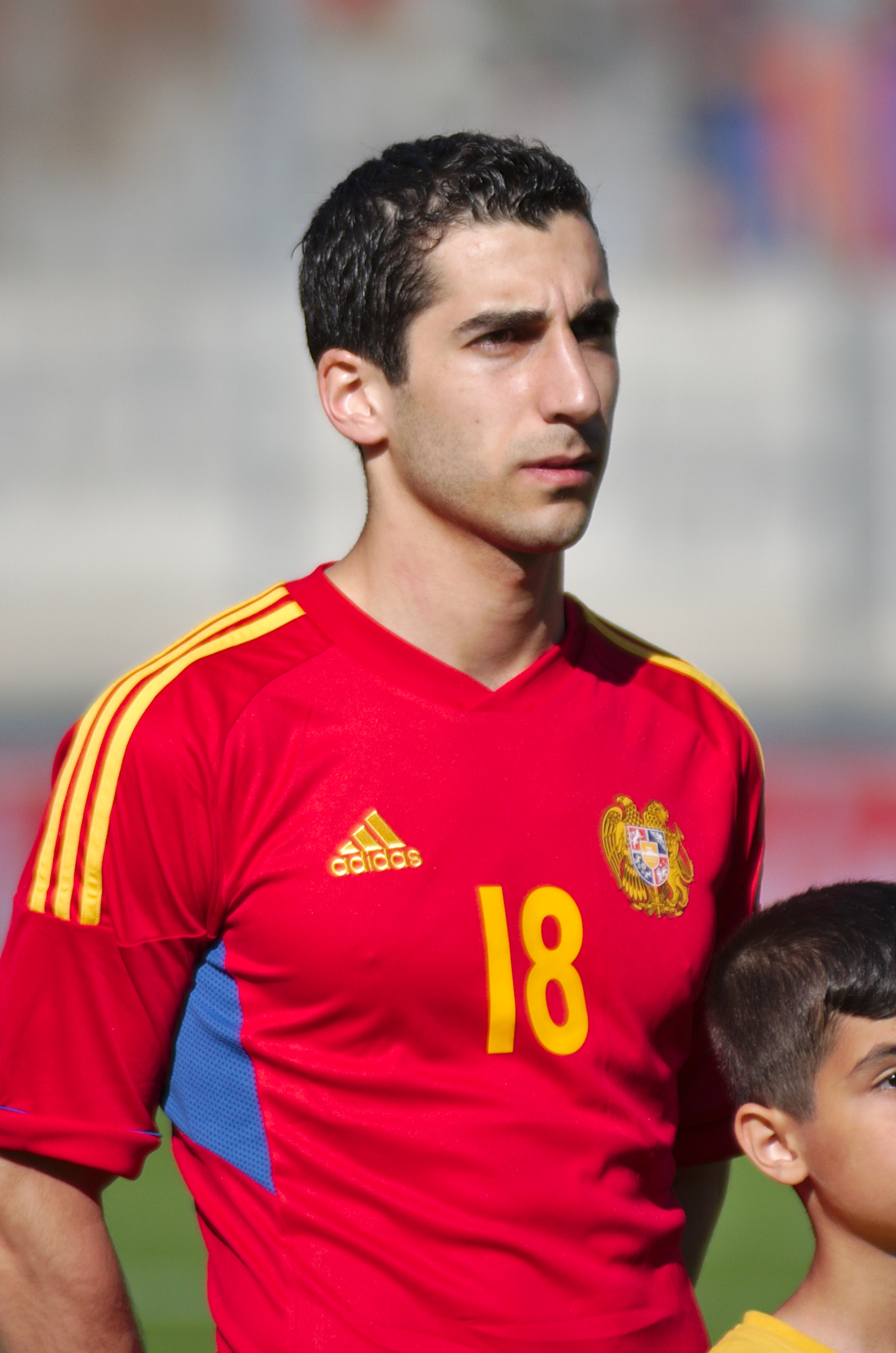
Henrikh Mkhitaryan is Armenia's top goalscorer with 32 goals.

Rank	Player	Goals	Caps	Ratio	Career
1	Henrikh Mkhitaryan (list)	32	95	0.34	2007–2021
2	Yura Movsisyan	14	38	0.37	2010–2018
2	Gevorg Ghazaryan	14	75	0.19	2007–2023
4	**Eduard Spertsyan**	13	46	0.28	2021–present
5	Marcos Pizzelli	11	67	0.16	2004–2019
5	Artur Petrosyan	11	69	0.16	1992–2004
7	Edgar Manucharyan	9	54	0.17	2004–2017
7	Tigran Barseghyan	9	64	0.14	2016–2025
9	Ara Hakobyan	7	44	0.16	1998–2008
10	Aleksandr Karapetyan	6	25	0.24	2014–2022
10	Aras Özbiliz	6	41	0.15	2012–2021
10	Artur Sarkisov	6	42	0.14	2011–2019
10	**Vahan Bichakhchyan**	6	47	0.13	2020–present
10	Armen Shahgeldyan	6	53	0.11	1992–2007

== Competitive record ==
=== FIFA World Cup ===
FIFA World Cup record										Qualification record						
Year	Round	Position	Pld	W	D	L	GF	GA	Squad	Pld	W	D	L	GF	GA	Position
(Uruguay) 1930 to (Italy) 1990	Part of Soviet Union									Part of Soviet Union						
(United States) 1994	FIFA member from 1992. Not admitted to the tournament. (Note: FIFA adopted a decision not to allow to participate in the 1994 FIFA World Cup the national teams of those former Soviet republics that did not participate in the qualification draw on 8 December 1991. A proposition of Ukraine to arrange a separate tournament for all successors of the Soviet Union and supported by Georgia and Armenia was blocked by Russia.)									Not admitted to the tournament						
(France) 1998	Did not qualify									10	1	5	4	8	17	4/6
(South Korea) (Japan) 2002	Did not qualify									10	0	5	5	7	19	6/6
(Germany) 2006	Did not qualify									12	2	1	9	9	25	6/7
(South Africa) 2010	Did not qualify									10	1	1	8	6	22	6/6
(Brazil) 2014	Did not qualify									10	4	1	5	12	13	5/6
(Russia) 2018	Did not qualify									10	2	1	7	10	26	5/6
(Qatar) 2022	Did not qualify									10	3	3	4	9	20	4/6
(Canada) (Mexico) (United States) 2026	Did not qualify									6	1	0	5	3	19	4/4
(Morocco) (Portugal) (Spain) 2030	To be determined									To be determined						
(Saudi Arabia) 2034	To be determined									To be determined						
Total	—	0/8	–	–	–	–	–	–	—	78	14	17	47	64	161	—

=== UEFA European Championship ===
UEFA European Championship record									Qualifying record						
Year	Round	Position	Pld	W	D	L	GF	GA	Pld	W	D	L	GF	GA	Position
(France) 1960 to (West Germany) 1988	Part of Soviet Union								Part of Soviet Union						
(Sweden) 1992	Part of CIS								Part of Soviet Union						
(England) 1996	Did not qualify								10	1	2	7	5	17	6/6
(Belgium) (Netherlands) 2000	Did not qualify								10	2	2	6	8	15	5/6
(Portugal) 2004	Did not qualify								8	2	1	5	7	16	4/5
(Austria) (Switzerland) 2008	Did not qualify								12	2	3	7	4	13	7/8
(Poland) (Ukraine) 2012	Did not qualify								10	5	2	3	22	10	3/6
(France) 2016	Did not qualify								8	0	2	6	5	14	5/5
(Europe) 2020	Did not qualify								10	3	1	6	14	25	5/6
(Germany) 2024	Did not qualify								8	2	2	4	9	11	4/5
(United Kingdom) (Republic of Ireland) 2028	To be determined								To be determined						
(Italy) (Turkey) 2032	To be determined								To be determined						
Total	—	0/8	–	–	–	–	–	–	76	17	15	44	74	121	—

=== UEFA Nations League ===
UEFA Nations League record
Season	Division	Group	Round	Pos.	Pld	W	D	L	GF	GA	P/R	RK
2018–19	D	4	Group stage	2nd	6	3	1	2	14	8	▲	45th
2020–21	C	2	Group stage	1st	6	3	2	1	9	6	▲	36th
2022–23	B	1	Group stage	4th	6	1	0	5	4	17	▼	31st
2024–25	C	4	Group stage	2nd	8	2	1	5	9	18	Same position	40th
2026–27	C	2	Group stage	3rd	6	1	3	2	5	6	Same position	43rd
Total					31	10	6	15	40	54	31st	

== All-time head-to-head record ==
Key
Positive balance (more wins)
Neutral balance (equal W/L ratio)
Negative balance (more losses)

Armenia all-time head-to-head record As of 15 November 2026, after the match against Latvia.
Opponents	Pld	W	D	L	GF	GA	GD
Albania	6	1	1	4	5	10	−5
Algeria	1	0	0	1	1	3	−2
Andorra	8	7	1	0	20	2	+18
Belarus	8	2	2	4	10	11	-1
Belgium	6	1	0	5	2	11	−9
Bosnia and Herzegovina	4	1	0	3	6	10	−4
Bulgaria	2	1	0	1	2	2	0
Canada	1	1	0	0	3	1	+2
Chile	1	0	0	1	0	7	−7
Croatia	3	0	1	2	1	3	–2
Cyprus	9	1	3	5	9	17	−8
Czech Republic	6	1	0	5	4	16	−12
Denmark	8	1	1	6	7	13	−6
Ecuador	1	0	0	1	0	3	−3
El Salvador	1	1	0	0	4	0	+4
Estonia	7	2	3	2	7	7	0
Faroe Islands	2	0	1	1	2	3	–1
Finland	6	0	1	5	1	11	−10
France	5	0	0	5	2	14	−12
Georgia	9	2	2	5	9	23	−14
Germany	5	0	0	5	3	25	−22
Gibraltar	2	1	0	1	6	3	+3
Greece	6	1	1	4	3	7	−4
Guatemala	2	1	1	0	8	2	+6
Hungary	3	0	0	3	0	5	−5
Iceland	5	1	2	2	3	5	−2
Iran	1	0	0	1	1	3	−2
Israel	1	0	0	1	0	2	−2
Italy	4	0	1	3	5	18	−13
Jordan	1	0	1	0	0	0	0
Kazakhstan	9	5	3	1	15	8	+7
Kosovo	3	0	1	2	4	8	−4
Kuwait	1	0	0	1	1	3	−2
Latvia	8	4	2	2	10	7	+3
Lebanon	1	1	0	0	1	0	+1
Liechtenstein	6	3	3	0	10	5	+5
Lithuania	4	2	0	2	6	7	−1
Luxembourg	1	0	1	0	1	1	0
North Macedonia	15	4	3	8	18	27	−9
Malta	6	4	1	1	5	2	+3
Moldova	6	1	4	1	6	8	−2
Montenegro	6	2	2	2	9	11	−2
Morocco	1	0	0	1	0	6	−6
Netherlands	2	0	0	2	0	3	−3
Northern Ireland	4	2	2	0	3	1	+2
Norway	3	0	1	2	1	13	−12
Panama	1	0	1	0	1	1	0
Paraguay	2	1	0	1	2	3	−1
Peru	1	0	0	1	0	4	−4
Poland	7	1	1	5	4	15	−11
Portugal	8	0	2	6	5	23	−18
Republic of Ireland	6	2	0	4	6	8	−2
Romania	7	1	1	5	4	15	−11
Russia	5	0	1	4	1	10	−9
Saint Kitts and Nevis	1	1	0	0	5	0	+5
Scotland	2	0	0	2	1	6	−5
Serbia	5	0	2	3	1	8	−7
Slovakia	2	2	0	0	7	1	+6
Slovenia	1	0	0	1	1	2	–1
Spain	6	0	0	6	1	16	−15
Sweden	1	0	0	1	1	3	−2
Turkey	4	0	1	3	2	7	−5
Turkmenistan	1	1	0	0	1	0	+1
Ukraine	10	0	3	7	8	25	−17
United Arab Emirates	1	1	0	0	4	3	+1
United States	1	0	0	1	0	1	−1
Uzbekistan	2	2	0	0	5	1	+4
Wales	4	1	3	0	7	5	+2
68 National Teams	264	66	56	142	267	493	–226

== See also ==
- Armenia national football team results
- Armenia national under-21 football team
- Armenia national under-19 football team
- Armenia national under-17 football team
- List of Armenian international footballers
