= David Manoukian =

French-Belgian-Armenian businessman (born 1975)

David J.L. Manoukian
- Born: January 10, 1975 (age 51)
- Education: Institut Le Rosey; Institut supérieur de gestion
- Occupation: CEO / President
- Known for: Son of Alain Manoukian, Founder and CEO of The-Sphere.com in 2008
- Children: 2 – Raffi, Azad
- Website: mnkholdings.lu

David J.L. Manoukian (January 10, 1975) is a French-Belgian-Armenian businessman. He is the founder, chairman, and chief executive officer of the luxury social network service The-Sphere.com. David Manoukian is the co-founder and chief executive officer of Realty Capital Partners which is a Company that invests in luxury real estate within niche markets such as Courchevel, Megève or Saint-Tropez.

== Early life ==
After studying in Le Rosey in Switzerland and then the US in Boston, David Manoukian got his Bachelor of Business Administration from the Institut supérieur de gestion in Paris in 1997. He went on to PricewaterhouseCoopers, the auditing and consulting firm where he worked first in the Audit division and then in the Corporate-Finance division in charge of mergers and acquisitions for 3 years.

== Career ==
In 2000, he joined the family group Alain Manoukian as the International President, and actively participated in the brand's expansion in Europe, Russia, the Middle East and Asia. It was also with the family company that he developed France's first textile E-commerce website. Before moving on to other horizons he oversaw the French ready-to-wear brand's acquisition by the American brand BCBG Max Azria and its subsequent growth in the United States. With his family in 2007, he turned his attention to urban commercial real estate development projects as well as high-luxury residential real estate. In 2008, he created a multimedia division exclusively dedicated to the Web and the first project was The Sphere.

== Personal life ==
David Manoukian is married to Chantal Manoukian; a Lebanese-Armenian woman who is a lawyer who took her bar exam in Paris. They have two boys Raffi and Azad.

== See also ==
- The Sphere (social network)
- List of social networking websites
