= John Manoogian =

John Manoogian may refer to:

- John Manoogian II, American Automobile Designer
- John Manoogian III, American Internet entrepreneur
