= Empyray =

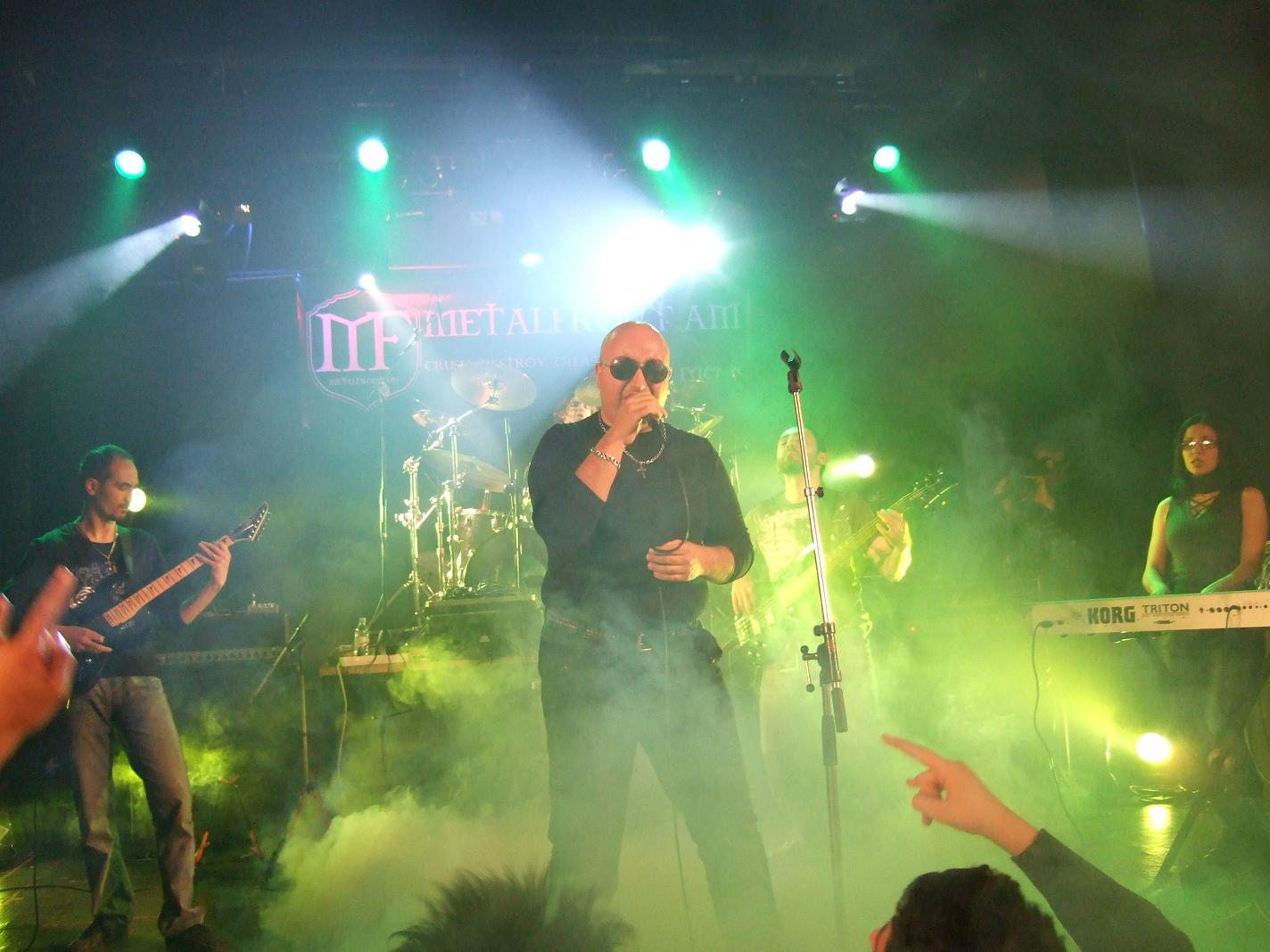
- Էմփիռեյ

Background information
- Origin: Yerevan, Armenia
- Genres: heavy rock, hard rock, oriental rock
- Years active: 1993–present
- Label: Empyray
- Members: Sargis Manukyan; Karen Arzoumanyan; Gisaneh Palyan; David Khurshudyan; Koryun Bobikyan

Empyray (Armenian: Էմփիռեյ) is an Armenian rock group, working in heavy rock, hard rock genres. Their works are characterized by imposing vocal, surprising melody transitions, thoughtful lyrics in Armenian and English languages, and complete, harmonic musical forms.

== History ==
The group was formed in 1993 on the initiative of Sargis Manoukyan and Karen Arzumanyan. There have been about 50 concerts since then, but they got wide recognition only in 2005. In 2006 Empyray recorded its debut CD album with 13 tracks in the group's own studio, gave its first solo concert and won Armenian National Music Awards in category "Best Rock Band". The group won the Best Rock Album category at the 2007 Armenian Music Awards.

== Title etymology ==
"Empyray" is the English transliteration of эмпирей - the Slavonic version of Greek empuros (Latin, empyreus, English empyrean), the highest part of the (supposedly spherical) heavens, thought in ancient times to contain the pure element of fire and by early Christians to be the abode of God and the angels

== Band members ==
- Sargis Manoukyan - vocalist, band's manager, graduated from university as an economist, has got 2-year training in vocal under the guidance of Yerevan State Conservatory professor Sergey Danielyan
- Karen Arzoumanyan - guitarist, composer, graduated from university as a medical doctor, has got secondary musical education, is married to Gisaneh Palyan
- Gisaneh Palyan - keyboardist, author of lyrics, graduated from Yerevan State Conservatory as a pianist, is married to Karen Arzoumanyan
- David Khurshudyan - bass guitarist
- Koryun Bobikyan - drummer

== Discography ==
=== Albums ===
- 2007 - Empyray
- 2009 - Hure (Հուր է)
- 2011 - Mekendmisht (Մեկընդմիշտ)

=== DVD ===
- 2008 - Evolution
