= The Sphere (social network) =

Luxury rental property network

The-Sphere.com
- Company type: Privately held company
- Website type: Property rental
- Available in: English/French
- Founded: France, (2008; 18 years ago)
- Headquarters: Paris, France
- Area served: Worldwide
- Founder: David Manoukian
- Key people: David Manoukian, CEO
- Industry: Property rental
- Website: www.the-sphere.com
- Registration: Required
- Launched: December 2, 2008; 17 years ago
- Current status: Active

The-Sphere.com is a network for renting luxury properties. It was founded in December 2008 by David Manoukian.

Before being accepted, an applicant must be approved by a committee.

Members also receive a concierge service and international networking opportunities.

There are also offline meeting of members such as at The Global Gift Gala 2013.

In 2009, the website organized the “Par Coeur Gala” to benefit the Make-A-Wish Foundation hosted by Eva Longoria.
