= Dietmar Bonnen =

German composer and pianist

Dietmar Bonnen (born 27 July 1958 in Cologne, Germany) is a German composer and pianist.

== Life ==
Dietmar Bonnen studied music and fine arts in Cologne and Düsseldorf. In 1981 he founded the avantgarde-rock ensemble Fleisch, with whom he recorded several CDs with his own compositions. After two years of production he published a CD called “Bonnen spielt …” with organ music of the 20th century. This production was the first, which combined different organs and acoustics from different churches made possible by recording techniques taken from pop music. Beside works of György Ligeti, Paul Hindemith, Charles Ives and Max Reger, he also played compositions written especially for this project and that cannot be performed on conventional organs. It contains premieres of two works of John Cage; “Solo with Obbligato Accompaniment of Two Voices in Canon, and Six Short Inventions on the Subjects of the Solo” from 1933/34 and “Composition for Three Voices” from 1934.

Later, Bonnen produced several CDs in several different musical genres, as for example the soundscape-composition “Bonnen in Beijing”, recorded 1993/94 for WDR in Beijing and Cologne. Other works present music of other composers in new arrangements. Examples are CDs with music of Frank Zappa, Hildegard von Bingen, Jimi Hendrix, Kurt Weill, Willie Dixon and Claudio Monteverdi.

Concerts in Europe, Asia, South America and especially Russia led to intensive collaborations with foreign artists and to the foundation of the “Russian-German Composers Quartet” with Alexei Aigui and Ivan Glebovich Sokolov from Moscow, Manfred Niehaus and Dietmar Bonnen from Cologne.

Bonnen is the director of the chamber choir Les Saxosythes.

He has more than 70 CD productions in different musical genres, composition commissions for different broadcasting companies and theatres to his name.

Important for his own composing are the works of Johann Sebastian Bach, Jimi Hendrix, Pier Paolo Pasolini, Joseph Beuys and John Cage, whose pieces can be found in many of Bonnen's productions.

== Compositions (selection) ==
Die Nachtwache (concert for accordion and string orchestra)

Beijing (Peking-soundscape)

Muspilli (composition for choir and organ)

Algarabia (composition for soprano and choir)

Adagio (composition for keyboards)

Gazimagusa (composition for electronics and piano)

Knäuel (composition for trumpet, guitar and electronics)

Quatuor plus 2 (composition for 3 drums, organ, clarinet and guitar)

Die Wolke des Vergessens (composition for ensemble)

Ouroboros (composition for three drums, electronics and clarinet)

i.m.J.C. (composition for electronics)

Blau (cycle for piano)

Früher, als wir die großen Ströme noch … (suite for speaker and ensemble) with Peter Rühmkorf and Andreas Schilling

Archangelos, Rodini, Solovki (graphic compositions)

Ben und seine Freunde im Konzert (cycle for sound sculptures) with Peter Hölscher and Andreas Schilling

bukhara (composition for doublebass, prepared piano and viola) with Andreas Schilling

Thai (ambient composition for double bass, percussion, piano and soundscape)

Ryoan-ji (composition for five melody instruments and percussion)

Medea (composition for three violoncelli, three electric guitars, percussion and electronics)

Chronotopia (composition for ensemble)

archet-en-ciel (composition for violoncello and electronics)

axis (composition for electronics and strings) with Arkady Marto

New York City Museums Cycle

Music I Forgot To Compose

Meetings With Remarkable Melodies (arrangements of music by George Gurdjieff )

Sphera with Arkady Marto
