= Gagik Manukyan =

Armenian footballer

Personal information
- Full name: Gagik Manukyan
- Date of birth: 16 August 1978
- Place of birth: Armenia
- Date of death: 5 August 2002 (aged 23)
- Position: Midfielder

Senior career*
Years	Team	Apps	(Gls)
1993–1997	Kotayk Abovyan	62	(4)
1997	FC Yerevan	10	(3)
1998–1999	Tsement Ararat	25	(6)
2000	Ararat Yerevan	2	(0)

International career
1997–2000	Armenia	5	(1)
- * Club domestic league appearances and goals

Gagik Manukyan (Armenian: Գագիկ Մանւկյան, born 22 December 1974; died 5 August 2002), was an Armenian football midfielder.

Manukyan was a member of the Armenia national team, being capped 5 times.
