= Manuk (disambiguation) =

Manuk is an uninhabited volcanic island located in the Banda Sea, Indonesia.

Manuk and its variances Manouk, Manoog and Manoug are also common Armenian given names (Armenian: Մանուկ) meaning child and/or infant.

Manuk and variants may also refer to:

== Places ==
- Manuk River, river in northern Java, Indonesia

== People ==
=== Manuk ===
- Manuk Bey or Manuc Bey (real name Emanuel Mârzayan) (1769–1817), Armenian merchant, diplomat and inn-keeper
- Manuk Abeghian (1865–1944), scholar of Armenian literature and folklore
- Manuk Kakosyan (born 1974), Armenian Russian professional football player

=== Manouk ===
- Manouk Avedissian or Bechara Effendi (1841–1925), Ottoman administrator and the chief engineer of the Vilayet of Syria and later of the Vilayet of Beirut
- Manouk Petrosian or Mekhitar of Sebaste (1674–1749), Armenian Catholic monk and a prominent theologian who founded the Mekhitarist Order

=== Manoug ===
- Manoug Exerjian (1898–1974), American Armenian architect
- Manoug Manougian, Lebanese Armenian scientist, professor, and father of the Lebanese space program
- Manoug Parikian (1920–1987), British Armenian concert violinist and violin professor

== Others ==
- Manuk Napinadar or Chicken Napinadar, typical Batak cuisine in Indonesia that is usually served at certain customary feasts

== See also ==
- Manukyan, a surname based on the given name
