= 2010–11 PFC Litex Lovech season =

Litex Lovech
2010–11 season
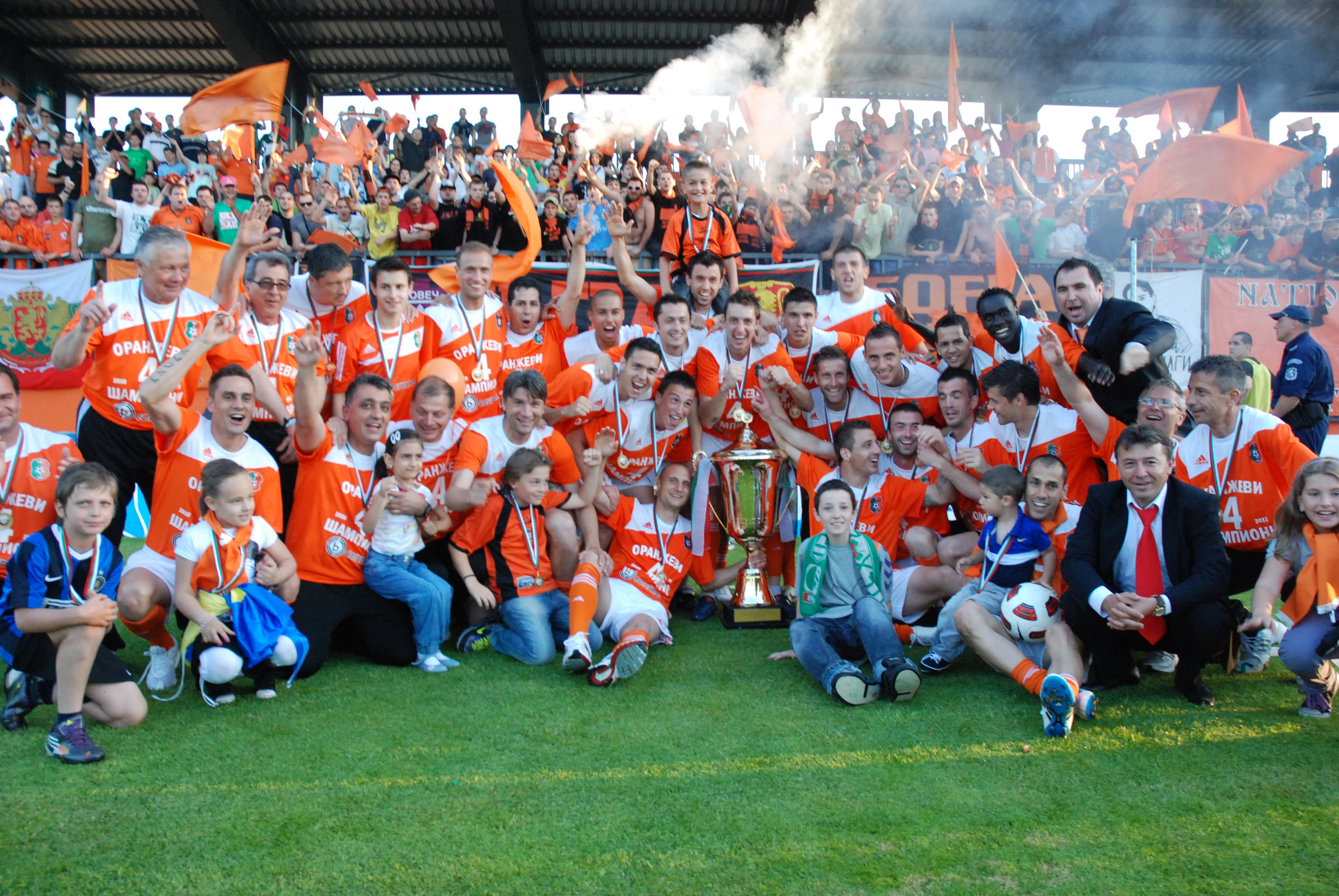
- PFC Litex Lovech celebrating winning the 2010–11 A Group
- Manager: Angel Chervenkov (until 5 August); Petko Petkov (from 5 Aug to 2 Sept); Lyuboslav Penev (from 2 Sept)
- Stadium: Lovech Stadium
- A Group: 1st
- Bulgarian Cup: Semi-finals
- Bulgarian Supercup: Winners
- UEFA Champions League: Third qualifying round
- UEFA Europa League: Play-off round
Home colours	Away colours	Third colours

The 2010–11 season was Professional Football Club Litex Lovech's 16th consecutive season in the A Group. In addition to the domestic league, Litex Lovech participated in this season's editions of the Bulgarian Cup, Bulgarian Supercup, UEFA Champions League and UEFA Europa League.

== Squad ==
Note: Flags indicate national team as defined under FIFA eligibility rules; some limited exceptions apply. Players may hold more than one non-FIFA nationality.

No.	Pos.	Nation	Player
1	GK	SRB	Uroš Golubović
2	DF	FRA	Alexandre Barthe
3	DF	BUL	Petar Zanev
4	DF	BIH	Džemal Berberović
5	DF	BUL	Mihail Venkov
6	DF	BUL	Ivaylo Petkov
7	MF	BUL	Hristo Yanev
8	MF	BRA	Tom
9	FW	BUL	Svetoslav Todorov
10	MF	BRA	Sandrinho
14	FW	SLO	Dejan Djermanović
15	MF	BRA	Doka Madureira

No.	Pos.	Nation	Player
16	MF	BUL	Strahil Popov
17	MF	BUL	Georgi Milanov
18	DF	BUL	Iliya Milanov
20	MF	BRA	Neném
21	DF	BUL	Aleksandar Tsvetkov
22	DF	BUL	Plamen Nikolov
23	MF	SRB	Nebojša Jelenković
27	FW	BUL	Momchil Tsvetanov
30	GK	BUL	Evgeni Aleksandrov
31	GK	BRA	Vinícius
33	DF	BUL	Nikolay Bodurov

== Competitions ==
=== Overview ===
Competition	First match	Last match	Starting round	Final position	Record							
Competition	First match	Last match	Starting round	Final position	Pld	W	D	L	GF	GA	GD	Win %
A Group	31 July 2010	28 May 2011	Matchday 1	Winners	30	23	6	1	56	13	+43	76.67
Bulgarian Cup	20 November 2010	20 April 2011	Second round	Semi-finals	4	2	1	1	6	4	+2	50.00
Bulgarian Supercup	11 August 2010		Final	Winners	1	1	0	0	2	1	+1	100.00
UEFA Champions League	13 July 2010	4 August 2010	Second qualifying round	Third qualifying round	4	2	1	1	7	4	+3	50.00
UEFA Europa League	19 August 2010	26 August 2010	Play-off round	Play-off round	2	0	0	2	1	4	−3	0.00
Total					41	28	8	5	72	26	+46	68.29

Source: Competitions

=== Bulgarian Supercup ===
11 August 2010 Final	Litex Lovech	2–1 (a.e.t.)	Beroe	Sofia
21:00 EEST (UTC+3)	Barthe 17'; Zanev (yellow card) 25'; Jelenković (yellow card) 36'; Niflore (yellow card) 53', (goal) 101'; Berberović (yellow card) 108'	Report	Berberović 4' (o.g.); Dimitrov (yellow card) 12'; Zhekov (yellow card) 51'; Genchev (yellow card) 108'	Stadium: Vasil Levski National Stadium; Referee: Stefan Spasov

=== A Group ===
==== League table ====
Pos	Team	Pld	W	D	L	GF	GA	GD	Pts	Qualification or relegation
1	Litex Lovech (C)	30	23	6	1	56	13	+43	75	Qualification for Champions League second qualifying round
2	Levski Sofia	30	23	3	4	67	24	+43	72	Qualification for Europa League third qualifying round
3	CSKA Sofia	30	18	7	5	53	26	+27	61	Qualification for Europa League play-off round (Note: CSKA Sofia have won the 2010–11 Bulgarian Cup competition and therefore qualified for the play-off round of the 2011–12 UEFA Europa League.)
4	Lokomotiv Sofia	30	16	4	10	47	33	+14	52 (Note: Lokomotiv Sofia ahead of Lokomotiv Plovdiv on head-to-head record; Lokomotiv Sofia–Lokomotiv Plovdiv 3–0, Lokomotiv Plovdiv–Lokomotiv Sofia 0–0.)	Qualification for Europa League second qualifying round
5	Lokomotiv Plovdiv	30	14	10	6	54	28	+26	52	

Source: A PFG (in Bulgarian)
Rules for classification: 1st points; 2nd head-to-head points; 3rd head-to-head goal difference; 4th head-to-head goals scored; 5th head-to-head away goals scored; 6th goal difference; 7th goals scored
(C) Champions

==== Results summary ====
Overall								Home						Away					
Pld	W	D	L	GF	GA	GD	Pts	W	D	L	GF	GA	GD	W	D	L	GF	GA	GD
30	23	6	1	56	13	+43	75	12	3	0	31	5	+26	11	3	1	25	8	+17

Source: Competitions

==== Matches ====
31 July 2010 1	Litex Lovech	2–1	Minyor Pernik	Lovech
21:00 EEST (UTC+3)	Bratu 10'; Petkov 51' (pen.)	Report	Gospodinov 90+2'	Stadium: Lovech Stadium; Referee: Nikolay Yordanov

8 August 2010 2	Beroe	1–1	Litex Lovech	Stara Zagora
18:00 EEST (UTC+3)	Zlatinov 90'	Report	Todorov 22'	Stadium: Stadion Beroe; Referee: Angel Angelov

14 August 2010 3	Litex Lovech	2–1	Pirin	Lovech
21:00 EEST (UTC+3)	G. Milanov 25'; Bodurov 50'	Report	Stoykov 66'	Stadium: Lovech Stadium; Referee: Atanas Dimitrov

22 August 2010 4	Lokomotiv Plovdiv	2–2	Litex Lovech	Plovdiv
18:00 EEST (UTC+3)	Lazarov 13'; De Carvalho 38'	Report	Niflore 8'; Sandrinho 41'	Stadium: Stadion Lokomotiv; Referee: Nikolay Yordanov

29 August 2010 5	Litex Lovech	2–0	Akademik Sofia	Lovech
21:00 EEST (UTC+3)	Tom 35'; Niflore 47'	Report	Sechkov (yellow card) 70'; Kyumurdzhiev (yellow card) 71'	Stadium: Lovech Stadium; Referee: Ivaylo Stoyanov

11 September 2010 6	CSKA Sofia	1–1	Litex Lovech	Sofia
21:00 EEST (UTC+3)	Marquinhos 39'	Report	Todorov 11'	Stadium: Vasil Levski National Stadium; Referee: Stefan Spasov

18 September 2010 7	Litex Lovech	0–0	Chernomorets Burgas	Lovech
21:00 EEST (UTC+3)		Report		Stadium: Lovech Stadium; Referee: Bogomil Marinov

25 September 2010 8	Vidima-Rakovski	0–3	Litex Lovech	Sevlievo
16:00 EEST (UTC+3)		Report	Niflore 26', 34'; Todorov 78'	Stadium: Rakovski Stadium; Referee: Vihren Manev

2 October 2010 9	Litex Lovech	3–1	Cherno More	Lovech
21:00 EEST (UTC+3)	Yanev 33'; Bodurov 64'; Bratu 90' (pen.)	Report	Dimov 40'	Stadium: Lovech Stadium; Referee: Ahmed Ahmed

16 October 2010 10	Sliven	0–1	Litex Lovech	Sliven
15:00 EEST (UTC+3)		Report	Niflore 43' (pen.)	Stadium: Stadion Hadzhi Dimitar; Referee: Ivaylo Stoyanov

25 October 2010 11	Litex Lovech	2–1	Levski Sofia	Lovech
21:00 EEST (UTC+3)	Yanev 29'; Nikolov (red card) 33'; Berberović (yellow card) 34'; Tom (yellow card) 35'; Bodurov (yellow card) 73'; Todorov 89'	Report	Dembélé 11', (yellow card) 86'; Tasevski (red card) 33'; Gadzhev (yellow card) 34'; Greene (yellow card) 35'; Minev (yellow card) 39'; Mulder (yellow card) 65'; Miliev (yellow card) 87'	Stadium: Lovech Stadium; Referee: Stanislav Todorov

31 October 2010 12	Litex Lovech	2–0	Slavia Sofia	Lovech
18:00 EET (UTC+2)	Todorov 10'; Barthe 67'	Report		Stadium: Lovech Stadium; Referee: Nikolay Yordanov

6 November 2010 13	Montana	0–2	Litex Lovech	Montana
14:00 EET (UTC+2)		Report	Tsvetanov 25'; Niflore 45'	Stadium: Stadion Ogosta; Referee: Ivaylo Stoyanov

13 November 2010 14	Litex Lovech	1–0	Lokomotiv Sofia	Lovech
18:00 EET (UTC+2)	Madureira 85'	Report		Stadium: Lovech Stadium; Referee: Angel Angelov

28 November 2010 15	Kaliakra	0–1	Litex Lovech	Kavarna
18:00 EET (UTC+2)		Report	Madureira 29'	Stadium: Kavarna Stadium; Referee: Nikolay Yordanov

27 February 2011 16	Minyor Pernik	0–3	Litex Lovech	Pernik
15:00 EET (UTC+2)		Report	Madureira 69', 89' (pen.); Diouf 90+5'	Stadium: Stadion Minyor; Referee: Ahmed Ahmed

7 March 2011 17	Litex Lovech	4–0	Beroe	Lovech
18:00 EET (UTC+2)	Madureira 27', 44', 70'; Djermanović 77'	Report		Stadium: Lovech Stadium; Referee: Atanas Dimitrov

12 March 2011 18	Pirin	1–2	Litex Lovech	Blagoevgrad
15:00 EET (UTC+2)	Karachanakov 15'	Report	Madureira 57'; Diouf 85'	Stadium: Stadion Hristo Botev; Referee: Nikolay Yordanov

20 March 2011 19	Litex Lovech	1–0	Lokomotiv Plovdiv	Lovech
18:00 EET (UTC+2)	Djermanović 85'	Report		Stadium: Lovech Stadium; Referee: Anton Genov

2 April 2011 20	Akademik Sofia	0–3	Litex Lovech	Sofia
17:00 EEST (UTC+3)	Organista 27'	Report	Kyumurdzhiev 45+2' (o.g.); Todorov 60'; G. Milanov 80'	Stadium: Stadion Aleksandar Shalamanov; Referee: Radoslav Stanev

10 April 2011 21	Litex Lovech	0–0	CSKA Sofia	Lovech
21:00 EEST (UTC+3)		Report		Stadium: Lovech Stadium; Referee: Tasko Taskov

16 April 2011 22	Chernomorets Burgas	0–1	Litex Lovech	Burgas
21:00 EEST (UTC+3)		Report	Yanev 7'	Stadium: efbet Arena; Referee: Ivaylo Stoyanov

24 April 2011 23	Litex Lovech	4–0	Vidima-Rakovski	Lovech
21:00 EEST (UTC+3)	Yanev 14', 47'; Todorov 54' (pen.); Madureira 74'	Report		Stadium: Lovech Stadium; Referee: Dimitar Andreev

30 April 2011 24	Cherno More	0–1	Litex Lovech	Varna
18:00 EEST (UTC+3)		Report	G. Milanov 61'	Stadium: Stadion Ticha; Referee: Stefan Spasov

4 May 2011 25	Litex Lovech	4–0	Sliven	Lovech
18:00 EEST (UTC+3)	Barthe 8'; G. Milanov 34'; Tsvetanov 38'; Djermanović 68'	Report		Stadium: Lovech Stadium; Referee: Stoyan Denev

8 May 2011 26	Levski Sofia	2–0	Litex Lovech	Sofia
21:00 EEST (UTC+3)	Mulder (yellow card) 22'; Minev (yellow card) 31' (yellow-red card) 89'; Ognyanov (yellow card) 41'; Dembélé 76'; Yovov 90'	Report	Yanev (yellow card) 29'; Madureira (yellow card) 87'	Stadium: Georgi Asparuhov Stadium; Referee: Pieter Vink (Netherlands)

13 May 2011 27	Slavia Sofia	0–1	Litex Lovech	Sofia
18:00 EEST (UTC+3)		Report	Deniran 59' (o.g.)	Stadium: Stadion Aleksandar Shalamanov; Referee: Georgi Kabakov

18 May 2011 28	Litex Lovech	4–1	Montana	Lovech
18:00 EEST (UTC+3)	Madureira 25', 30'; Barthe 47'; Zanev 68'	Report	Ivanov 63'	Stadium: Lovech Stadium; Referee: Atanas Dimitrov

21 May 2011 29	Lokomotiv Sofia	1–3	Litex Lovech	Sofia
18:00 EEST (UTC+3)	Lahchev 68'	Report	Tsvetanov 48'; Todorov 54'; Madureira 72'	Stadium: Stadion Balgarska Armia; Referee: Stanislav Todorov

28 May 2011 30	Litex Lovech	0–0	Kaliakra	Lovech
18:00 EEST (UTC+3)	G. Milanov (yellow card) 39'	Report	Bonev (yellow card) 90+4'	Stadium: Lovech Stadium; Referee: Stefan Apostolov

=== Bulgarian Cup ===
20 November 2010 Second round	Chernomorets Balchik	1–2	Litex Lovech	Albena
13:30 EET (UTC+2)	Pavlov 78'	Report	Doka 34'; Bratu 90+2'	Stadium: Stadion Albena-1; Attendance: 2,000; Referee: Anton Genov

4 December 2010 Third round	Chernomorets Pomorie	0–2	Litex Lovech	Pomorie
13:00 EET (UTC+2)		Report	Todorov 40' (pen.), 47'	Stadium: Stadion Pomorie; Attendance: 1,300; Referee: Atanas Dimitrov

6 April 2011 Quarter-finals	Litex Lovech	1–1 (4–2 p)	Levski Sofia	Lovech
18:00 EEST (UTC+3)	Tom 34' (pen.)	Report	Dembélé 79'	Stadium: Lovech Stadium; Attendance: 6,000; Referee: Lars Christoffersen (Denmark)
	Penalties
	Tom (penalty scored); Doka (penalty missed); Djermanović (penalty scored); Todorov (penalty scored); Zanev (penalty scored)		(penalty scored) Dembélé; (penalty missed) Aleks; (penalty scored) Ognyanov; (penalty missed) Isa
Note: Litex Lovech won 4–2 on penalties.

20 April 2011 Semi-finals	CSKA Sofia	2–1	Litex Lovech	Sofia
21:00 EEST (UTC+3)	Delev 28', 87'	Report	G. Milanov 68'	Stadium: Stadion Balgarska Armia; Referee: Anton Genov

=== UEFA Champions League ===
==== Second qualifying round ====
13 July 2010 First leg	Litex Lovech (Bulgaria)	1–0	(Montenegro) Rudar Pljevlja	Lovech, Bulgaria
20:50 EEST (UTC+3)	I. Popov 8'	Report	Useni (yellow card) 27'; Ranđelović (yellow card) 33'; Igumanović (yellow card) 40'; Bojović (yellow card) 59' (yellow-red card) 85'	Stadium: Lovech Stadium; Attendance: 8,256; Referee: Pavel Olšiak (Slovakia)

20 July 2010 Second leg	Rudar Pljevlja (Montenegro)	0–4 (0–5 agg.)	(Bulgaria) Litex Lovech	Podgorica, Montenegro (Note: The match was played at the Stadion Pod Goricom in Podgorica, instead of Rudar Pljevlja regular stadium, the Gradski stadion in Pljevlja, which did not meet UEFA requirements.)
20:30 CEST (UTC+2)	Adžić (yellow card) 18'; Mićić (yellow card) 38'; Useni (yellow card) 80'	Report	Tom (yellow card) 19'; Niflore 28'; Jelenković 39'; Bodurov (yellow card) 45'; Bratu 74', 90'	Stadium: Stadion Pod Goricom; Attendance: 2,137; Referee: Stanislav Sukhina (Russia)
Note: Litex Lovech won 5–0 on aggregate.

==== Third qualifying round ====
27 July 2010 First leg	Litex Lovech (Bulgaria)	1–1	(Slovakia) Žilina	Lovech, Bulgaria
20:00 EEST (UTC+3)	Barthe (yellow card) 71'; Tom 78'; Nikolov (yellow card) 87'	Report	Oravec (yellow card) 52'; Piaček (yellow card) 58'; Majtán 65'	Stadium: Lovech Stadium; Attendance: 5,920; Referee: Kristinn Jakobsson (Iceland)

4 August 2010 Second leg	Žilina (Slovakia)	3–1 (4–2 agg.)	(Bulgaria) Litex Lovech	Žilina, Slovakia
19:30 CEST (UTC+2)	Jež (penalty missed) 22'; Rilke 52'; Oravec 70'; Ceesay 84'	Report	Bodurov (yellow card) 22'; I. Popov (yellow card) 25' (yellow-red card) 53'; Sandrinho 50'; Niflore (yellow card) 61'; Jelenković (yellow card) 70'; Berberović (yellow card) 73'	Stadium: Štadión pod Dubňom; Attendance: 8,123; Referee: Thomas Einwaller (Austria)
Note: Žilina won 4–2 on aggregate.

=== UEFA Europa League ===
==== Play-off round ====
19 August 2010 First leg	Debrecen (Hungary)	2–0	(Bulgaria) Litex Lovech	Nyíregyháza, Hungary (Note: The match was played at the Városi Stadion in Nyíregyháza, instead of Debrecen regular stadium, the Oláh Gábor utcai Stadion in Debrecen, which did not meet UEFA requirements.)
19:00 CEST (UTC+2)	Coulibaly 22'; Laczkó 33'; Bernáth (yellow card) 76'; J. Varga (yellow card) 90+1'	Report	Barthe (yellow card) 35' (yellow-red card) 69'	Stadium: Városi Stadion; Attendance: 8,125; Referee: Leontios Trattou (Cyprus)

26 August 2010 Second leg	Litex Lovech (Bulgaria)	1–2 (1–4 agg.)	(Hungary) Debrecen	Lovech, Bulgaria
20:30 EEST (UTC+3)	Niflore 68'	Report	Laczkó (yellow card) 24'; Mbengono 53'; Mijadinoski (yellow card) 58'; Czvitkovics 81'	Stadium: Lovech Stadium; Attendance: 2,500; Referee: Robert Malek (Poland)
Note: Debrecen won 4–1 on aggregate.
