= 2009–10 A Group =

86th season of top-tier football league in Bulgaria

A Group
- Season: 2009–10
- Dates: 7 August 2009 – 16 May 2010
- Champions: Litex Lovech (3rd title)
- Relegated: Botev Plovdiv; Sportist Svoge; Loko Mezdra
- Champions League: Litex Lovech
- Europa League: CSKA Sofia; Levski Sofia; Beroe (via domestic cup)
- Matches: 191
- Goals: 462 (2.42 per match)
- Top goalscorer: (France) Wilfried Niflore (19 goals)
- Biggest home win: Levski 5–0 Botev; Litex 5–0 Loko P. Levski 5–0 Sportist
- Biggest away win: Loko M. 0–5 Litex; Loko P. 0–5 CSKA; Loko M. 0–5 Ch'morets
- Highest scoring: Minyor 4–2 Sliven; Ch. More 4–2 Loko S. Loko P. 3–3 Minyor; Sportist 1–5 Loko S. Sliven 2–4 CSKA; Loko P. 2–4 Montana; CSKA 5–1 Loko S. Sportist 2–4 Litex

The 2009–10 A Group was the 86th season of the Bulgarian national top football division, and the 62nd of A Group as the top tier football league in the country. It began on 7 August 2009 with the game between Beroe and Lokomotiv Sofia. The last round took place on 16 May 2010. Levski Sofia were the defending champions, but they were unable to defend it and Litex Lovech won the title, which was their third overall.

== Promotion and relegation from 2008–09 ==
Belasitsa Petrich, Spartak Varna and Vihren Sandanski were directly relegated for finishing in the bottom three places. Belasitsa ended a six-year stint in the Bulgarian top flight, while Spartak Varna were relegated for a record ninth time since the introduction of the A PFG, after three years. Vihren ended their four-year tenure in the A PFG, the club's first ever in the top division.

The relegated teams were replaced by Montana, champions of the West B PFG 2008-2009, and Beroe Stara Zagora, champions of the East B PFG 2008-2009. Montana returned to the A PFG after twelve years, while Beroe returned after a one-year absence. Beroe won promotion for the ninth time in its history, therefore equaling the record previously set by Minyor Pernik.

A further place in the league was decided through a one-legged play-off. Sportist Svoge as runner-up in West B PFG had to face Naftex Burgas, who came second in East B PFG. Sportist Svoge won the game 4–2 after a penalty shootout, following a regular time score of 2–2. This was Sportist's first participation in the Bulgarian top flight.

== Team overview ==
Location of teams in 2009–10 A Group
Sofia 2009–10 A Group football clubs

| Club | Location | Manager | Stadium | Capacity | Team captain |
|---|---|---|---|---|---|
| Beroe | Stara Zagora | (Bulgaria) Ilian Iliev | Beroe | 17,800 | (Bulgaria) Slavi Zhekov |
| Botev | Plovdiv | (Italy) Enrico Piccioni | Hristo Botev (Plovdiv) | 21,000 | (Bulgaria) Vasil Vasilev |
| Cherno More | Varna | (Bulgaria) Velizar Popov | Ticha | 8,250 | (Bulgaria) Georgi Iliev |
| Chernomorets | Burgas | (Bulgaria) Krasimir Balakov | Lazur | 18,037 | (Bulgaria) Cvetomir Conkov |
| CSKA | Sofia | (Bulgaria) Pavel Dochev | Bulgarian Army | 22,015 | (Bulgaria) Todor Yanchev |
| Levski | Sofia | (Bulgaria) Georgi Ivanov | Georgi Asparuhov | 29,200 | (Bulgaria) Georgi Petkov |
| Litex | Lovech | (Bulgaria) Angel Chervenkov | Gradski Stadion | 7,050 | (Bulgaria) Ivelin Popov |
| Lokomotiv Mezdra | Mezdra | (Bulgaria) Voyn Voynov | Lokomotiv (Mezdra) | 5,000 | (Bulgaria) Strati Iliev |
| Lokomotiv Plovdiv | Plovdiv | (Bulgaria) Hristo Bonev | Lokomotiv (Plovdiv) | 13,800 | (Bulgaria) Georgi Mechedzhiev |
| Lokomotiv Sofia | Sofia | (Bulgaria) Dimitar Vasev | Lokomotiv (Sofia) | 22,000 | (Bulgaria) Georgi Markov |
| Minyor | Pernik | (Bulgaria) Anton Velkov | Minyor | 12,000 | (Bulgaria) Ivaylo Ivanov |
| Montana | Montana | (Bulgaria) Atanas Dzhambazki | Ogosta | 8,000 | (Bulgaria) Ventsislav Ivanov |
| Sliven 2000 | Sliven | (Serbia) Dragoljub Simonović | Hadzhi Dimitar | 10,000 | (Bulgaria) Miroslav Mindev |
| Pirin | Blagoevgrad | (Bulgaria) Stefan Grozdanov | Hristo Botev (Bgd) | 7,500 | (Bulgaria) Georgi Georgiev |
| Slavia | Sofia | (Bulgaria) Velislav Vutsov | Ovcha Kupel | 18,000 | (Bulgaria) Yordan Petkov |
| Sportist | Svoge | (Bulgaria) Stoycho Stoev | Chavdar Cvetkov | 3,500 | (Bulgaria) Todor Kyuchukov |

== League table ==
| Pos | Team | Pld | W | D | L | GF | GA | GD | Pts | Qualification or relegation |
|---|---|---|---|---|---|---|---|---|---|---|
| 1 | Litex Lovech (C) | 30 | 22 | 4 | 4 | 59 | 17 | +42 | 70 | Qualification for Champions League second qualifying round |
| 2 | CSKA Sofia | 30 | 16 | 10 | 4 | 51 | 25 | +26 | 58 | Qualification for Europa League third qualifying round |
| 3 | Levski Sofia | 30 | 17 | 6 | 7 | 57 | 26 | +31 | 57 | Qualification for Europa League second qualifying round |
| 4 | Lokomotiv Sofia | 30 | 15 | 7 | 8 | 47 | 33 | +14 | 52 | |
| 5 | Chernomorets Burgas | 30 | 15 | 6 | 9 | 44 | 29 | +15 | 51 | |
| 6 | Slavia Sofia | 30 | 14 | 8 | 8 | 34 | 28 | +6 | 50 | |
| 7 | Cherno More | 30 | 13 | 9 | 8 | 40 | 28 | +12 | 48 | |
| 8 | Minyor Pernik | 30 | 13 | 6 | 11 | 38 | 26 | +12 | 45 | |
| 9 | Pirin Blagoevgrad | 30 | 11 | 10 | 9 | 34 | 32 | +2 | 43 | |
| 10 | Beroe | 30 | 10 | 8 | 12 | 30 | 36 | −6 | 38 | Qualification for Europa League third qualifying round (Note: Beroe won the 2009–10 Bulgarian Cup and qualified for the third qualifying round of the UEFA Europa League.) |
| 11 | Montana | 30 | 9 | 9 | 12 | 30 | 37 | −7 | 36 | |
| 12 | Lokomotiv Plovdiv | 30 | 9 | 6 | 15 | 36 | 52 | −16 | 33 | |
| 13 | Sliven | 30 | 9 | 5 | 16 | 29 | 40 | −11 | 32 | |
| 14 | Lokomotiv Mezdra (R) | 30 | 7 | 6 | 17 | 30 | 48 | −18 | 27 | Relegation to 2010–11 B Group |
| 15 | Sportist Svoge (R) | 30 | 5 | 4 | 21 | 23 | 59 | −36 | 19 | Relegation to 2010–11 B Group |
| 16 | Botev Plovdiv (Note: Botev Plovdiv were expelled from the league during the winter break because they were unable to meet the criteria required to continue the season, and deducted six points for administrative irregularities. All of their remaining matches have been scratched and will be counted as a 3–0 win for their opponents.) (R) | 30 | 1 | 4 | 25 | 12 | 78 | −66 | 1 | Relegation to 2010–11 B Group |

Source: A PFG (in Bulgarian)
Rules for classification: 1st points; 2nd head-to-head points; 3rd head-to-head goal difference; 4th head-to-head goals scored; 5th head-to-head away goals scored; 6th goal difference; 7th goals scored
(C) Champions; (R) Relegated

== Results ==
| Home \ Away | BSZ | BOT | CHM | CHB | CSK | LEV | LIT | LME | LPL | LSO | MIN | MON | OFC | PIR | SLA | SPO |
|---|---|---|---|---|---|---|---|---|---|---|---|---|---|---|---|---|
| Beroe | | 3–1 | 0–0 | 1–1 | 0–0 | 1–3 | 3–0 | 1–0 | 0–1 | 2–1 | 0–3 | 0–0 | 0–1 | 1–1 | 0–1 | 1–0 |
| Botev Plovdiv | 0–3 (Note: Matches awarded after Botev's expulsion during the winter break.) | | 0–3 | 0–3 | 0–1 | 0–3 | 0–3 | 0–3 | 1–0 | 0–3 | 0–3 | 2–3 | 0–3 | 2–2 | 0–1 | 1–1 |
| Cherno More | 0–0 | 3–0 | | 2–0 | 0–0 | 1–1 | 0–0 | 2–0 | 3–2 | 4–2 | 1–0 | 2–1 | 4–0 | 1–1 | 1–1 | 3–0 |
| Chernomorets Burgas | 0–2 | 2–0 | 2–1 | | 2–0 | 1–1 | 1–2 | 3–0 | 2–1 | 0–2 | 3–1 | 1–1 | 2–0 | 2–1 | 2–2 | 3–0 |
| CSKA Sofia | 3–0 | 3–0 | 2–2 | 0–0 | | 2–0 | 1–0 | 4–0 | 3–2 | 5–1 | 0–3 | 1–1 | 1–0 | 1–1 | 2–0 | 4–1 |
| Levski Sofia | 0–1 | 5–0 | 3–0 | 0–1 | 0–0 | | 2–2 | 3–1 | 2–0 | 1–2 | 3–1 | 3–1 | 2–0 | 2–0 | 3–0 | 5–0 |
| Litex Lovech | 3–0 | 2–1 | 4–0 | 2–0 | 2–0 | 3–0 | | 3–0 | 5–0 | 2–0 | 1–0 | 3–0 | 1–0 | 0–1 | 1–0 | 2–0 |
| Lokomotiv Mezdra | 2–1 | 2–2 | 1–2 | 0–5 | 4–0 (Note: This match was abandoned after 66 minutes, with Lokomotiv Mezdra leading 1–0, due to a pitch invasion by CSKA supporters. The match was awarded a 4–0 win in favour of Lokomotiv Mezdra; CSKA Sofia were fined $10,370 and their stadium was suspended for three games.) | 1–1 | 0–5 | | 0–0 | 1–2 | 0–1 | 0–2 | 1–1 | 4–0 | 0–0 | 2–1 |
| Lokomotiv Plovdiv | 1–3 | 3–0 | 1–0 | 2–1 | 0–5 | 2–2 | 0–3 | 0–1 | | 2–1 | 3–3 | 2–4 | 1–2 | 2–0 | 0–2 | 3–0 |
| Lokomotiv Sofia | 2–0 | 2–2 | 1–2 | 0–1 | 2–2 | 2–0 | 0–1 | 2–1 | 3–0 | | 1–1 | 0–0 | 2–0 | 1–0 | 0–0 | 3–2 |
| Minyor Pernik | 3–0 | 3–0 | 1–0 | 2–0 | 0–0 | 0–2 | 0–1 | 1–0 | 0–0 | 1–2 | | 1–1 | 4–2 | 0–1 | 0–1 | 1–2 |
| Montana | 2–1 | 3–0 | 1–2 | 2–0 | 1–2 | 0–2 | 0–0 | 1–1 | 2–3 | 0–1 | 0–0 | | 0–0 | 0–3 | 2–0 | 1–0 |
| OFC Sliven | 1–1 | 3–0 | 0–0 | 0–1 | 2–4 | 1–0 | 1–2 | 1–0 | 1–1 | 1–3 | 1–3 | 1–0 | | 4–0 | 1–2 | 1–0 |
| Pirin Blagoevgrad | 2–2 | 3–0 | 1–0 | 1–3 | 0–0 | 0–2 | 4–1 | 3–1 | 0–0 | 1–1 | 0–1 | 2–0 | 2–0 | | 1–0 | 2–0 |
| Slavia Sofia | 3–1 | 3–0 | 1–0 | 3–2 | 1–3 | 1–3 | 1–1 | 1–0 | 1–3 | 0–0 | 1–0 | 4–0 | 2–1 | 0–0 | | 1–0 |
| Sportist Svoge | 1–2 | 3–0 | 2–1 | 0–0 | 0–2 | 2–3 | 2–4 | 0–4 | 2–1 | 1–5 | 0–1 | 0–1 | 1–0 | 1–1 | 1–1 | |

Source: A PFG (in Bulgarian)
Legend: Blue = home team win; Yellow = draw; Red = away team win.

== Champions ==
Litex Lovech

Goalkeepers
| 1 | (Serbia) Uroš Golubović | 19 | (0) |
| 12 | (Bulgaria) Todor Todorov | 0 | (0) |
| 30 | (Bulgaria) Evgeni Aleksandrov | 0 | (0) |
| 31 | (Brazil) Rodrigo Galatto | 12 | (0) |

Defenders
| 2 | (France) Alexandre Barthe | 27 | (2) |
| 3 | (Bulgaria) Petar Zanev | 19 | (0) |
| 5 | (Bulgaria) Mihail Venkov | 10 | (1) |
| 6 | (Bulgaria) Ivaylo Petkov | 15 | (1) |
| 14 | (Bulgaria) Tsvetomir Panov | 1 | (0) |
| 18 | (Bulgaria) Iliya Milanov | 1 | (0) |
| 22 | (Bulgaria) Plamen Nikolov | 27 | (1) |
| 25 | (Bulgaria) Radostin Kishishev | 20 | (0) |
| 33 | (Bulgaria) Nikolay Bodurov | 18 | (2) |

Midfielders
| 7 | (Bulgaria) Hristo Yanev | 26 | (6) |
| 8 | (Brazil) Tom | 18 | (2) |
| 10 | (Brazil) Sandrinho | 25 | (1) |
| 13 | (Bulgaria) Maksim Stoykov | 1 | (0) |
| 15 | (Brazil) Doka Madureira | 26 | (6) |
| 17 | (Bulgaria) Georgi Milanov | 27 | (2) |
| 21 | (Bulgaria) Aleksandar Tsvetkov | 1 | (0) |
| 23 | (Serbia) Nebojša Jelenković | 24 | (1) |
| 24 | (Brazil) Adriano Miranda* | 1 | (0) |
| 27 | (Bulgaria) Momchil Tsvetanov | 4 | (1) |
| 28 | (Brazil) Diego Ferraresso | 9 | (0) |

Forwards
| 9 | (Bulgaria) Svetoslav Todorov | 12 | (1) |
| 19 | (France) Wilfried Niflore | 27 | (19) |
| 71 | (Bulgaria) Ivelin Popov | 18 | (7) |
| 99 | (Bulgaria) Dormushali Saidhodzha* | 11 | (1) |

Manager
| (Bulgaria) Angel Chervenkov |

- Saidhodzha and Miranda left the club during a season.

== Statistics ==
=== Top goalscorers ===
Source:Bulgarian PFL official site

| Rank | Scorer | Club | Goals |
|---|---|---|---|
| 1 | (France) Wilfried Niflore | Litex Lovech | 19 |
| 2 | (Bulgaria) Martin Kamburov | Lokomotiv Sofia | 16 |
| 3 | (Bulgaria) Ismail Isa | Lokomotiv Mezdra | 11 |
| 3 | (Brazil) Junior | Slavia Sofia | 11 |
| 3 | (Bulgaria) Georgi Andonov | Beroe | 11 |
| 3 | (Bulgaria) Hristo Yovov | Levski Sofia | 11 |
| 7 | (Bulgaria) Deyan Hristov | Sliven | 10 |
| 8 | (Bulgaria) Miroslav Antonov | Sportist Svoge / Levski Sofia | 9 |
| 8 | (Serbia) Goran Janković | Minyor Pernik | 9 |
| 10 | (Bulgaria) Ivan Stoyanov | CSKA Sofia | 8 |
| 10 | (Bulgaria) Yordan Todorov | CSKA Sofia / Lokomotiv Plovdiv | 8 |

=== Top assistants ===
Source:Sportal Archived 2009-12-12 at the Wayback Machine

| Rank | Player | Club | Assists |
|---|---|---|---|
| 1 | (France) Wilfried Niflore | Litex Lovech | 9 |
| 2 | (Bulgaria) Daniel Peev | Pirin / Slavia Sofia | 8 |
| 3 | (Bulgaria) Strati Iliev | Lokomotiv Mezdra | 7 |
| 3 | (Bulgaria) Ivelin Popov | Litex Lovech | 7 |
| 5 | (Bulgaria) Galin Ivanov | Slavia Sofia | 6 |
| 6 | (Argentina) Roberto Carboni | Chernomorets Burgas | 5 |
| 6 | (Bulgaria) Tom | Litex Lovech | 5 |
| 8 | (Bulgaria) Hristo Yanev | Litex Lovech | 4 |
| 8 | (Bulgaria) Georgi Iliev | Cherno More | 4 |
| 8 | (Bulgaria) Slavi Zhekov | Beroe | 4 |
| 8 | (Bulgaria) Todor Kolev | Slavia Sofia | 4 |
| 8 | (Serbia) Velimir Ivanović | Minyor Pernik | 4 |
| 8 | (Argentina) Adrián Fernández | Chernomorets Burgas | 4 |

== Transfers ==
- List of Bulgarian football transfers summer 2009
- List of Bulgarian football transfers winter 2010

== Attendances ==
| # | Club | Average |
|---|---|---|
| 1 | Chernomorets | 3,996 |
| 2 | Beroe | 3,876 |
| 3 | CSKA Sofia | 3,511 |
| 4 | Botev | 2,439 |
| 5 | Montana | 2,359 |
| 6 | Levski | 2,277 |
| 7 | Cherno More | 1,983 |
| 8 | Lokomotiv Plovdiv | 1,771 |
| 9 | Minyor | 1,582 |
| 10 | Lovech | 1,270 |
| 11 | Pirin | 1,214 |
| 12 | Sliven | 1,009 |
| 13 | Sportist | 678 |
| 14 | Lokomotiv Sofia | 676 |
| 15 | Lokomotiv Mezdra | 591 |
| 16 | Slavia Sofia | 452 |

== See also ==
- 2009–10 B Group
- 2009–10 Bulgarian Cup
