= Tom (footballer, born 1985) =

Brazilian footballer

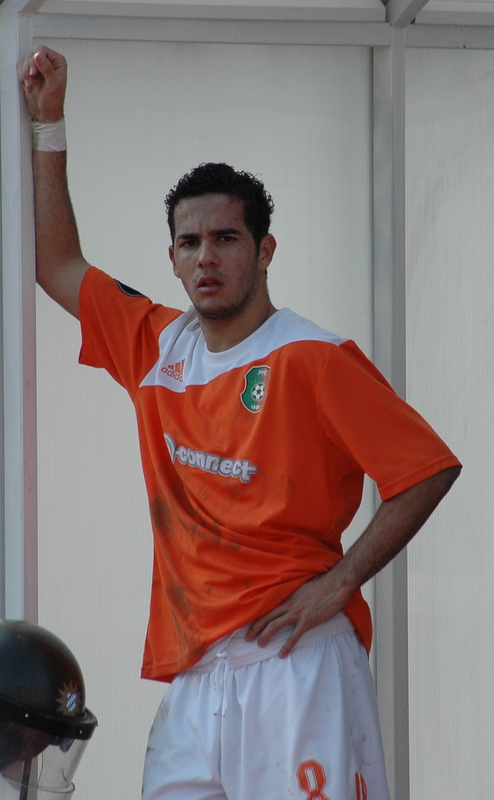

Personal information
- Full name: Wellington Brito da Silva
- Date of birth: 23 July 1985 (age 41)
- Place of birth: Aruja, São Paulo, Brazil
- Height: 1.81 m (5 ft 11 in)
- Position: Winger

Senior career*
Years	Team	Apps	(Gls)
2006	Portuguesa Londrinense	?	(?)
2006–2011	Litex Lovech	110	(15)
2012–2015	İstanbul Başakşehir	42	(2)
2014	→ Litex Lovech (loan)	13	(0)
2015–2018	Elazığspor	86	(14)
2018–2019	Hatayspor	19	(3)
2020–2021	Botev Vratsa	28	(0)
2021–2022	Dobrudzha	15	(1)
- * Club domestic league appearances and goals

Wellington Brito da Silva (born 23 July 1985), commonly known as Tom, is a Brazilian former professional footballer who played as a winger. He spent majority of his career in Bulgaria and Turkey.

== Career ==
=== Litex Lovech ===
In November 2006, Tom joined Litex Lovech from Portuguesa Londrinense. He made his A Group debut on 3 March 2007 in the 3–1 win away to Spartak Varna. His first two goals for the club came in a 7–1 home win over Belasitsa Petrich on 12 May.

Tom began the 2007–08 season in fine form for Litex, scoring in a 1–1 draw against CSKA Sofia on the opening day of the season at the Lovech Stadium on 11 August. In December 2007 Tom was named the Litex Player of the Year by fans, beating Mihail Venkov and Ivelin Popov to the award. In March 2008 he received a Bulgarian passport and he announced his intention to play for the Bulgaria national team. On 14 May 2008, Tom gave the assist to Stanislav Manolev against Cherno More Varna in the 2008 Bulgarian Cup Final which was the winning goal, as Litex won it 1–0.

On 26 October 2008, Tom scored his first league goal of the 2008–09 season, netting Litex's first against Lokomotiv Plovdiv in a 3–1 away win. His second goal came in the 2–1 home win over Lokomotiv Mezdra on 2 November. Two weeks later, he scored his third goal in a 2–0 win over Sliven. Tom netted his first goal of 2009 as he scored Litex's fоurth in a 5–1 home victory over Botev Plovdiv on 4 April.

On 27 July 2010 in a 1–1 home draw against Žilina in the third qualifying round of the 2010–11 Champions League, Tom netted his first goal of the season and his first-ever European goal. On 11 August he assisted Wilfried Niflore for Litex's winning goal in a 2–1 win over Beroe Stara Zagora in the match for the 2010 Bulgarian Supercup. On 29 August Tom scored his first league goal of the season in a 2–0 home victory over Akademik Sofia. On 16 April 2011, Tom dislocated his shoulder in a 1–0 win over Chernomorets Burgas and was out to the end of the season.

He returned in the first match of the following campaign on 12 July against Mogren Budva in the second qualifying round of the 2011–12 Champions League. Tom netted Litex's only and his first goal of the season in their loss in the third qualifying round of the Champions League, a 2–1 defeat against Wisła Kraków on 26 July.

=== İstanbul Başakşehir ===
On 6 December 2011, Tom joined Turkish Süper Lig side İstanbul Başakşehir for an undisclosed fee. On 7 January 2012, he made his debut, playing the first 55 minutes in a 0–2 home loss against Trabzonspor in the Turkish Süper Lig match. He netted for the first time on 11 January, which turned out to be an extra time winning goal against Adanaspor in a Turkish Cup match.

=== Botev Vratsa ===
Tom returned to Bulgaria in January 2020, signing a contract with Botev Vratsa.

=== Dobrudzha ===
After spending some time training with Bansko, in August 2021 he joined Dobrudzha.

== Honours ==
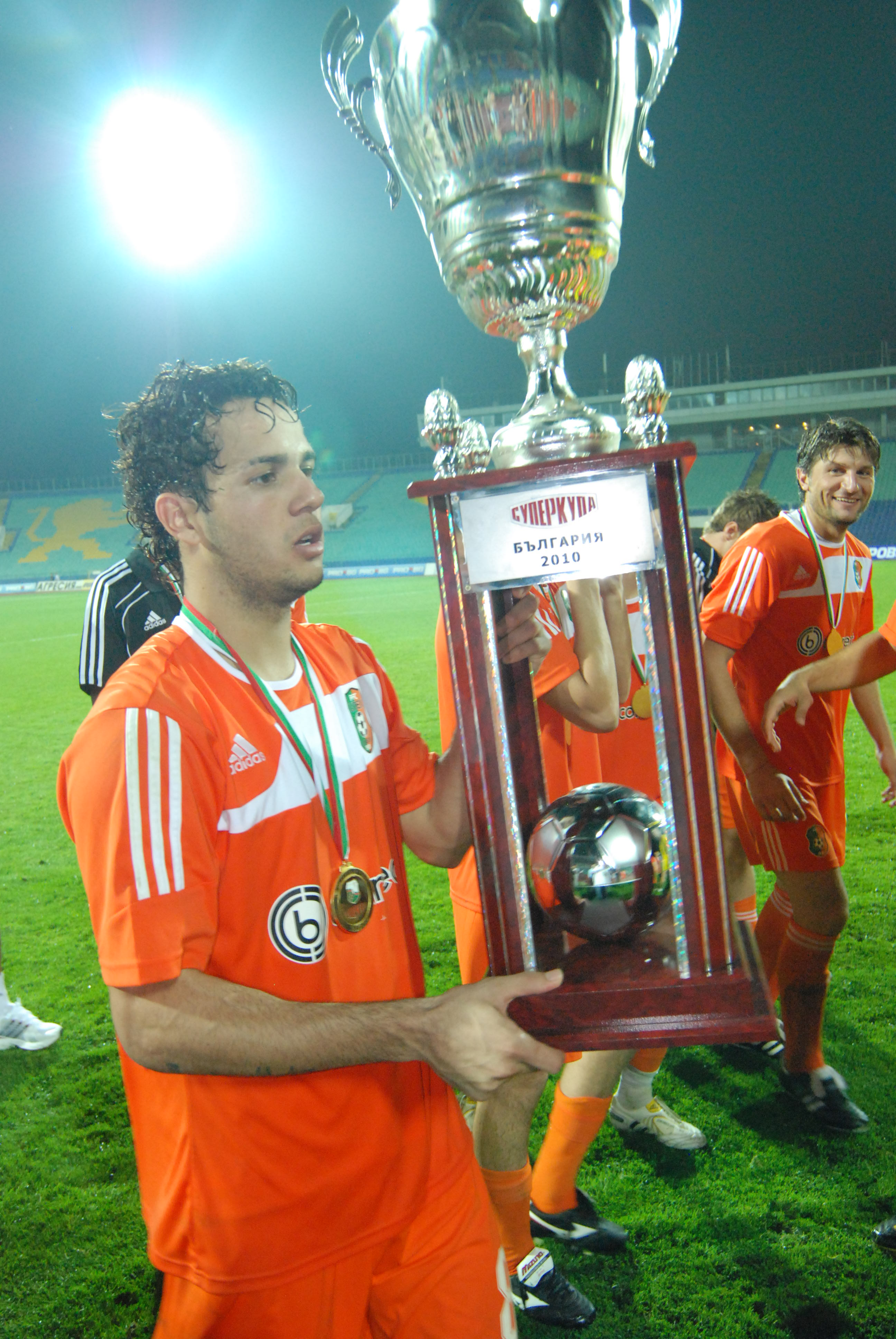
Tom with the Bulgarian Supercup

Litex Lovech

- Bulgarian League: 2009–10, 2010–11
- Bulgarian Cup: 2008, 2009
- Bulgarian Supercup: 2010
