= Georgi Milanov (footballer) =

Bulgarian footballer (born 1992)

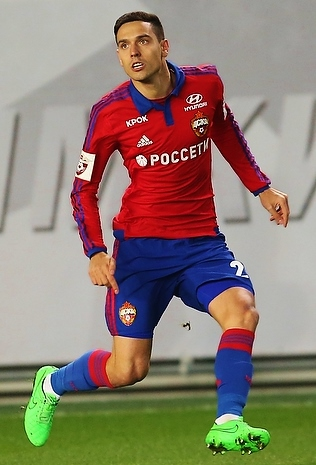
- Milanov with CSKA Moscow in November 2015

Personal information
- Full name: Georgi Ventsislavov Milanov
- Date of birth: 19 February 1992 (age 34)
- Place of birth: Levski, Bulgaria
- Height: 1.84 m (6 ft 1/2 in)
- Position: Attacking midfielder

Team information
- Current team: Botev Plovdiv
- Number: 17

Youth career
- 2005–2009: Litex Lovech

Senior career*
Years	Team	Apps	(Gls)
2009–2013	Litex Lovech	106	(28)
2013–2018	CSKA Moscow	99	(5)
2016	→ Grasshoppers (loan)	11	(0)
2018–2020	MOL Fehérvár	42	(4)
2021–2023	Levski Sofia	41	(4)
2023	Al Dhafra	14	(0)
2024–2026	Dinamo București	86	(4)
2026–	Botev Plovdiv	5	(0)

International career^{‡}
2010	Bulgaria U19	3	(1)
2010–2013	Bulgaria U21	10	(2)
2011–	Bulgaria	54	(2)
- * Club domestic league appearances and goals as of 6 October 2026 ‡ National team caps and goals as of 7 September 2025

Georgi Ventsislavov Milanov (Bulgarian: Георги Венциславов Миланов; born 19 February 1992) is a Bulgarian professional footballer who plays as a central midfielder for Bulgarian First League club Botev Plovdiv.

== Club career ==
=== Litex Lovech ===
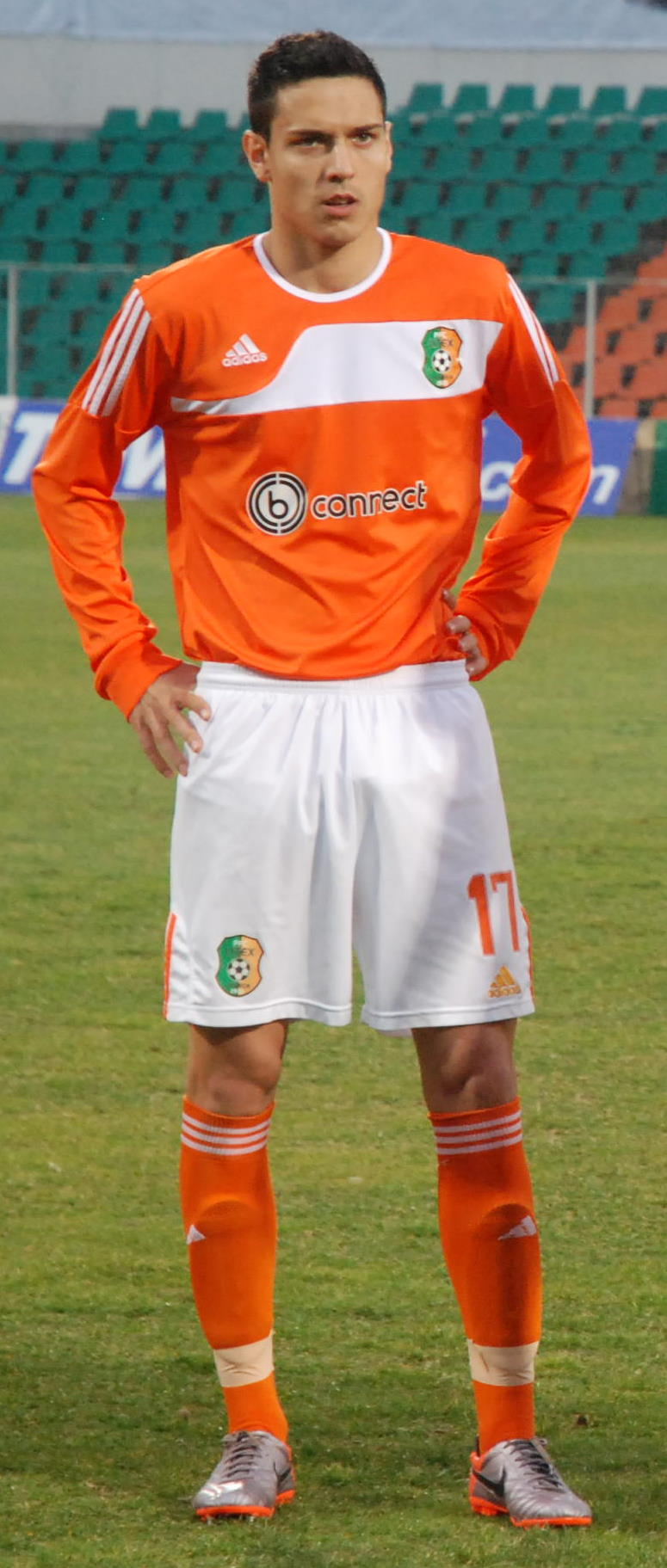
Milanov with Litex in 2010

Born in Levski, Pleven Province, Milanov began playing football at the local club, before joined the Litex Lovech Academy, together with his twin brother Iliya, in 2005. He was part of a group of young players at the club who guided the club to win the Bulgarian U-17 Championship in June 2009, with Milanov scoring in the final against Levski Sofia.

On 1 August 2009, Milanov made his first team debut, at 17 years 152 days, coming off the bench in the 2009 Bulgarian Supercup against Levski Sofia, which ended in a 1–0 defeat at Vasil Levski National Stadium. A week later, he made his league debut against Lokomotiv Mezdra, scoring the opening goal in a 5–0 victory. On 3 December, he scored his first ever Bulgarian Cup goal, in a 4–0 win over Pirin Gotse Delchev which sent them through to the 1/8 finals. Milanov play regularly in his first season, making 31 appearances in all competitions and collected his first A PFG title winner's medal at the end of the 2009–10 season.

On 14 August 2010, in a 2–1 home victory over Pirin Blagoevgrad, Milanov netted his first goal of 2010–11 season. He ended his second season with 5 goals in 36 appearances in all competitions. Milanov helped Litex retain the A PFG title by a 3-point margin after being pushed by Levski Sofia for much of the season.

In 2011–12 season, Milanov scored 6 goals in 25 league matches. On 24 May 2012, he was credited with the ABF A PFG Young Player of the Season award, by the professional footballers association of Bulgaria.

On 19 August 2012, Milanov scored his first goal of 2012–13 season in a 1–1 away draw against Lokomotiv Plovdiv. On 27 October, he scored his first ever hat-trick in the A PFG, against Montana, in a 3–1 victory at Ogosta Stadium; he scored from a penalty kick and a two free-kicks. On 27 December 2012, he became the youngest ever recipient of the Bulgarian Footballer of the Year award.

On 30 March 2013, as a result of injuries to regular captains Nebojša Jelenković and Nikolay Bodurov, Milanov captained Litex for the first time against Botev Vratsa in a 5–1 home win. On 14 April, he played his 100th match for Litex in the league in a 2–1 away loss against Slavia Sofia.

=== CSKA Moscow ===
On 5 July 2013, Milanov signed with Russian Premier League side CSKA Moscow on a five-year deal for an initial fee of 5,4 million leva, with a further 2 million leva depending on CSKA appearances in the UEFA competitions in the next two years. He was given the number 23 jersey.

He made his official debut on 18 August 2013, in the 1–0 home win over Kuban Krasnodar in a league match after coming on as a late substitute for Keisuke Honda. Although having had trouble fitting into the club at start, Milanov is improving at a fast rate according to head coach Leonid Slutsky, resulting in him becoming a regular starter plus in him receiving playing time in important European matches in the group stages of the 2013–14 UEFA Champions League. He provided his first assist in a 4–1 home win over Terek Grozny; it was the opening goal of the match netted by teammate Seydou Doumbia. Milanov scored his first official goal for CSKA Moscow in a game against FC Zenit Saint Petersburg on 16 March 2014 – a long range effort that eventually won the game for his team; being the only goal scored in the whole match. His classy goal didn't go unnoticed, as he was voted player of the week for matchday 21 in the Russian Premier League. For the 2016–17 season, Milanov received the number 8 jersey upon his return from Grasshopper. He scored his first goal of the season in a 0–1 away win against FC Ural, saving his team from a 0–0 draw in the last seconds of the game. Upon the expiration of his contract at the end of the 2017–18 season, he left CSKA as a free agent.

==== Grasshoppers loan ====
On 16 February 2016, CSKA Moscow announced that Milanov had joined Swiss Super League side Grasshopper Club Zürich on loan for the remainder of the season.

=== Fehérvár ===
On 3 September 2018, he joined Hungarian club Fehérvár FC. He made his debut on 15 September in a 2–1 away loss against Puskás Akadémia FC. He scored his first goal for the club on 23 September in a 0–2 win against Cigánd SE, in a match for the Magyar Kupa. On 8 November 2018, he scored the only goal in a 1–0 home win against PAOK in a Europa League match.

On 21 July 2020, Milanov left Fehérvár on mutual agreement.

=== Levski Sofia ===
After more than a year without a club, Milanov joined Levski Sofia on 29 July 2021, signing a one-year contract with the club.

=== Dinamo București ===
On 19 January 2024, Dinamo București announced the signing of Milanov, when the club was in the Liga I relegation zone. Milanov made his debut for the team on 27 January 2024, in the 1–2 loss against Rapid București, when he came in as a substitute in the 78th minute to replace Dennis Politic. On 12 February 2024, he provided an assist for Darko Velkovski in the 2–0 away win against champions Farul Constanța and he was selected as man of the match.

== International career ==
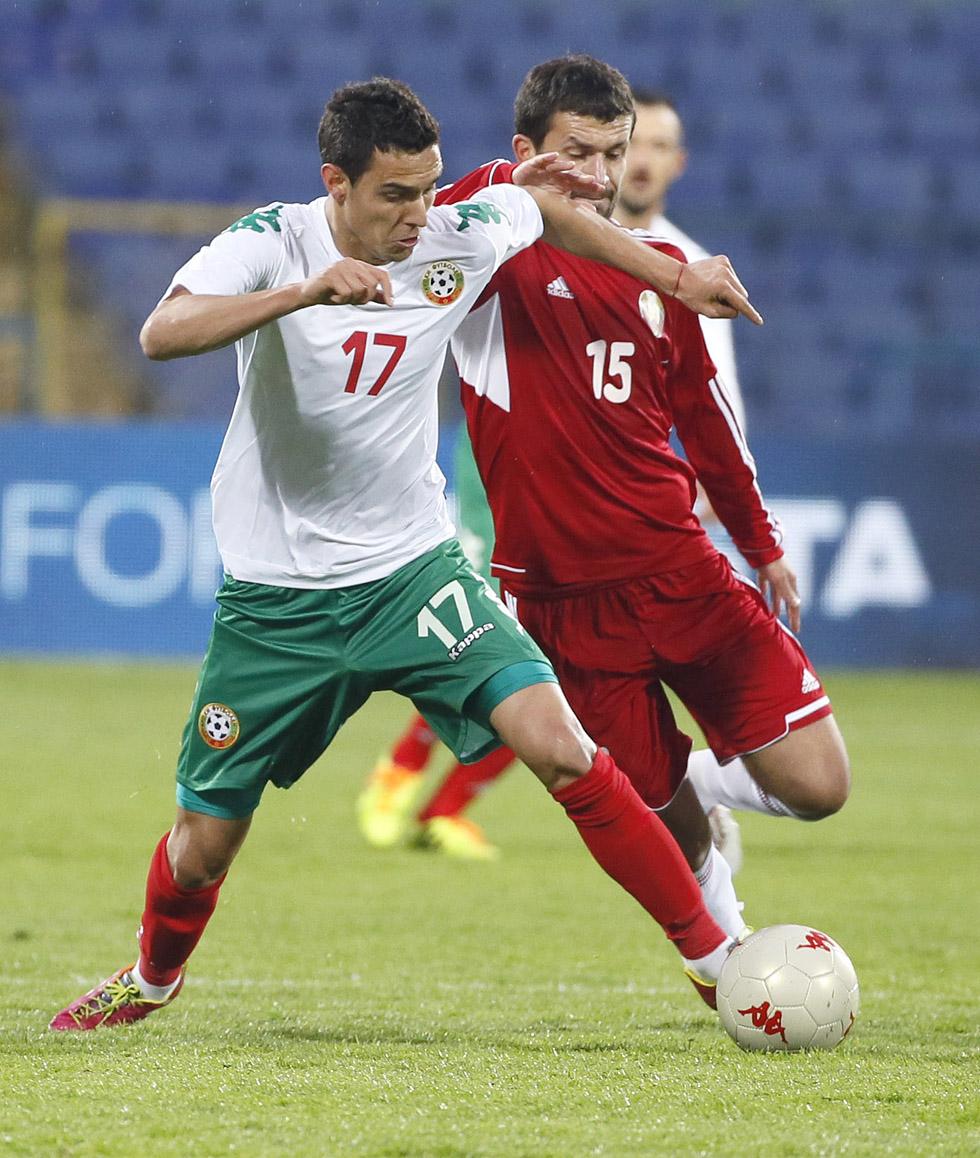
Milanov in 2012

Milanov was called up to the Bulgaria under-21 team for the first time in February 2010, making his competitive debut on 3 March, in a 0–2 loss against Montenegro U21.

Milanov was called up to the senior Bulgaria squad for the first time in September 2011, and made his full international debut in a friendly against Ukraine at Valeriy Lobanovskyi Dynamo Stadium on 7 October, playing 24 minutes as a substitute of a 3–0 loss for Bulgaria. On 7 September 2012, Milanov scored his first international goal in a 2–2 home draw against Italy during 2014 FIFA World Cup qualifying.

On 28 March 2015 Milanov made an assist for the Bulgarian national team during the 2–2 draw with Italy.

== Career statistics ==
=== Club ===
As of 21 July 2026

Appearances and goals by club, season and competition
Club	Season	League			National cup (Note: Includes Bulgarian Cup, Russian Cup, Magyar Kupa, UAE President's Cup, Cupa României)		Europe		Other		Total	
Club	Season	Division	Apps	Goals	Apps	Goals	Apps	Goals	Apps	Goals	Apps	Goals
Litex Lovech	2009–10	A Group	27	2	2	1	1 (Note: Appearance(s) in UEFA Europa League)	0	1 (Note: Appearance in Bulgarian Super Cup)	0	31	4
Litex Lovech	2010–11	A Group	27	4	3	1	5 (Note: Three appearances in UEFA Champions League, two appearances in UEFA Europa League)	0	1	0	36	5
Litex Lovech	2011–12	A Group	25	6	2	0	6 (Note: Four appearances in UEFA Champions League, two appearances in UEFA Europa League)	0	1	0	34	6
Litex Lovech	2012–13	A Group	27	16	6	3	—		—		33	19
Litex Lovech	Total		106	28	13	5	12	0	3	0	134	34
CSKA Moscow	2013–14	Russian Premier League	22	1	4	0	6 (Note: Appearances in UEFA Champions League)	0	0	0	32	1
CSKA Moscow	2014–15	Russian Premier League	28	2	3	0	6	0	1 (Note: Appearance in Russian Super Cup)	0	35	2
CSKA Moscow	2015–16	Russian Premier League	18	0	2	0	8	0	0	0	28	0
CSKA Moscow	2016–17	Russian Premier League	18	2	1	1	6	0	1	0	26	3
CSKA Moscow	2017–18	Russian Premier League	13	0	1	0	10 (Note: Six appearances in UEFA Champions League, four appearances in UEFA Europa League)	0	0	0	24	0
CSKA Moscow	Total		99	5	11	1	36	0	2	0	145	6
Grasshoppers (loan)	2015–16	Swiss Super League	11	0	0	0	—		—		11	0
Fehérvár	2018–19	Nemzeti Bajnokság I	24	1	7	2	6	1	0	0	37	4
Fehérvár	2019–20	Nemzeti Bajnokság I	18	3	6	0	4	0	0	0	28	3
Fehérvár	Total		42	4	13	2	10	1	0	0	65	7
Levski Sofia	2021–22	Bulgarian First League	23	2	5	2	—		0	0	28	4
Levski Sofia	2022–23	First League	18	2	2	1	3 (Note: Appearances in UEFA Europa Conference League)	0	1	1	22	4
Levski Sofia	Total		41	4	7	3	3	0	1	1	52	8
Al Dhafra	2022–23	UAE Pro League	14	0	1	0	—		—		15	0
Dinamo București	2023–24	Liga I	15	2	—		—		2 (Note: Appearances in Liga I promotion/relegation play-offs)	0	17	2
Dinamo București	2024–25	Liga I	39	0	1	0	—		—		40	0
Dinamo București	2025–26	Liga I	32	2	4	0	—		1 (Note: Appearances in Liga I European play-offs)	0	37	2
Dinamo București	Total		86	4	5	0	—		3	0	94	4
Botev Plovdiv	2026–27	Bulgarian First League	1	0	0	0	—		—		1	0
Career total			400	45	50	11	61	1	9	1	520	58

=== International ===
As of match played 7 September 2025

Appearances and goals by national team and year
National team	Year	Apps	Goals
Bulgaria	2011	1	0
Bulgaria	2012	8	1
Bulgaria	2013	7	0
Bulgaria	2014	6	1
Bulgaria	2015	6	0
Bulgaria	2016	6	0
Bulgaria	2017	4	0
Bulgaria	2018	3	0
Bulgaria	2019	1	0
Bulgaria	2020	1	0
Bulgaria	2021	0	0
Bulgaria	2022	4	0
Bulgaria	2023	0	0
Bulgaria	2024	2	0
Bulgaria	2025	5	0
Total		54	2

Scores and results list Bulgaria's goal tally first, score column indicates score after each Milanov goal.

List of international goals scored by Georgi Milanov
No.	Date	Venue	Opponent	Score	Result	Competition
1	7 September 2012	Vasil Levski National Stadium, Sofia, Bulgaria	Italy	2–2	2–2	2014 FIFA World Cup qualification
2	5 March 2014	Vasil Levski National Stadium, Sofia, Bulgaria	Belarus	1–0	2–1	Friendly

== Personal life ==
His twin brother Iliya, is also a football player, who plays as a defender for Bulgarian Third League club Rilski Sportist.

== Honours ==
=== Club ===
Litex Lovech

- A PFG: 2009–10, 2010–11
- Bulgarian Supercup: 2010

CSKA Moscow

- Russian Premier League: 2013–14, 2015–16
- Russian Super Cup: 2013, 2014

MOL Fehérvár

- Magyar Kupa: 2018–19

Levski Sofia

- Bulgarian Cup: 2021–22
- Bulgarian Supercup runner-up: 2022

=== Individual ===
- Bulgarian Footballer of the Year : 2012
- A PFG Player of the Year: 2012
- Bulgarian First League Goal of the Week: 2021–22 (Week 7) v. Lokomotiv Plovdiv, (Week 9) v. CSKA Sofia

== See also ==
- List of foreign Russian Premier League players
- List of foreign Swiss Super League players
- List of foreign Nemzeti Bajnokság I players
- List of foreign Liga I players
