= 2010 Bulgarian Supercup =

Финал за Суперкупата на България 2010
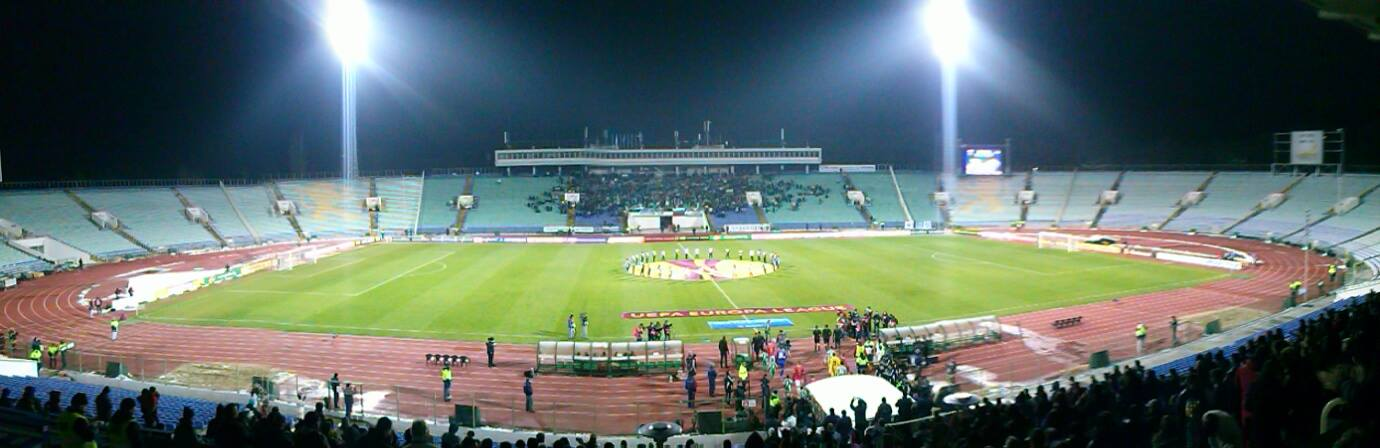
Litex Lovech	Beroe
A Group	Bulgarian Cup
2	1
- Date: 11 August 2010
- Venue: Vasil Levski National Stadium, Sofia
- Man of the Match: Wilfried Niflore
- Referee: Stefan Spasov (Pernik)
- Attendance: 3,000

The 2010 Bulgarian Supercup was a football match played on 11 August 2010 between 2009–10 A PFG champions Litex Lovech and 2009–10 Bulgarian Cup winners Beroe. Litex won the game 2–1, after the match finished 1–1 after 90 minutes. The French players Alexandre Barthe and Wilfried Niflore scored Litex's goals.

== Match details ==
11 August 2010
21:00 EEST

Litex Lovech	2–1 (a.e.t.)	Beroe
Barthe 17'; Niflore 101'	Report	Berberović 4' (o.g.)

Vasil Levski National Stadium, Sofia
Attendance: 3,000
Referee: Stefan Spasov

Litex Lovech	Beroe

Litex Lovech:
GK	1	(Serbia) Uroš Golubović
DF	2	(France) Alexandre Barthe
DF	3	(Bulgaria) Petar Zanev	(yellow card) 24'
DF	4	(Bosnia and Herzegovina) Džemal Berberović
DF	6	(Bulgaria) Ivaylo Petkov
MF	23	(Serbia) Nebojša Jelenković (c)	(yellow card) 37'
MF	7	(Bulgaria) Hristo Yanev		(substituted off) 108'
MF	10	(Brazil) Sandrinho		(substituted off) 58'
FW	8	(Brazil) Tom
FW	19	(France) Wilfried Niflore	(yellow card) 52'
FW	27	(Bulgaria) Momchil Tsvetanov		(substituted off) 58'
Substitutes:
GK	30	(Bulgaria) Evgeni Aleksandrov
FW	9	(Bulgaria) Svetoslav Todorov		(substituted in) 58'
FW	11	(Romania) Florin Bratu
MF	17	(Bulgaria) Georgi Milanov		(substituted in) 58'
DF	18	(Bulgaria) Iliya Milanov
DF	22	(Bulgaria) Plamen Nikolov		(substituted in) 108'
DF	33	(Bulgaria) Nikolay Bodurov
Manager:
(Bulgaria) Petko Petkov

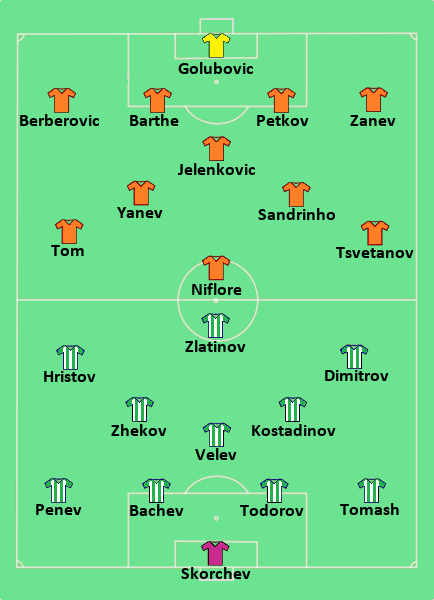

Beroe:
GK	33	(Bulgaria) Teodor Skorchev
DF	23	(Bulgaria) Aleksandar Tomash
DF	3	(Bulgaria) Todor Todorov
DF	24	(Bulgaria) Stanislav Bachev
DF	28	(Bulgaria) Veselin Penev
MF	16	(Bulgaria) Stefan Velev
MF	7	(Bulgaria) Slavi Zhekov (c)	(yellow card) 51'
MF	18	(Bulgaria) Petar Kostadinov		(substituted off) 72'
FW	19	(Bulgaria) Vladislav Zlatinov		(substituted off) 102'
FW	21	(Bulgaria) Todor Hristov
FW	88	(Bulgaria) Petar Dimitrov	(yellow card) 12'	(substituted off) 89'
Substitutes:
GK	1	(Bulgaria) Plamen Petrov
MF	6	(Bulgaria) Simeon Minchev
MF	10	(Bulgaria) Dian Genchev		(substituted in) 72'
FW	11	(Bulgaria) Stoycho Mladenov
FW	14	(Bulgaria) Evgeni Yordanov		(substituted in) 102'
DF	25	(Bulgaria) Miroslav Enchev
MF	77	(Bulgaria) Georgi Bozhanov		(substituted in) 89'
Manager:
(Bulgaria) Ilian Iliev

MATCH OFFICIALS

- Assistant referees:
  - Nikola Dzhuganski
  - Nikolay Angelov
- Fourth official: Ahmed Ahmed

MATCH RULES

- 90 minutes.
- 30 minutes of extra-time if necessary.
- Penalty shoot-out if scores still level.
- Seven named substitutes.
- Maximum of three substitutions.
