= Evgeni Aleksandrov =

Bulgarian footballer

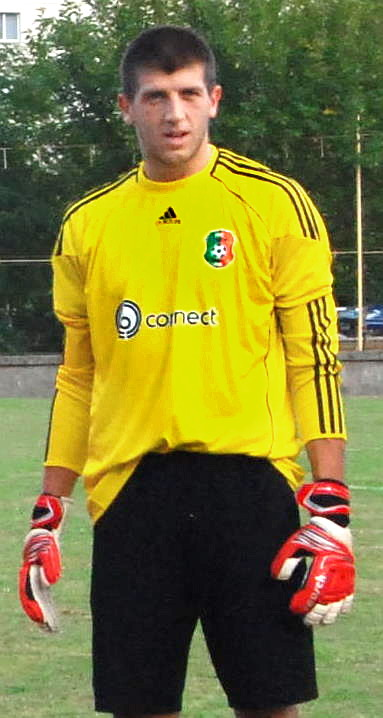

Personal information
- Date of birth: 14 June 1988 (age 38)
- Place of birth: Elin Pelin, Bulgaria
- Height: 1.98 m (6 ft 6 in)
- Position: Goalkeeper

Youth career
- 2000–2001: Levski Elin Pelin
- 2001–2005: Septemvri Sofia

Senior career*
Years	Team	Apps	(Gls)
2005–2016	Litex Lovech	33	(0)
2015–2016	Litex Lovech II	11	(0)
2016	Dunav Ruse	0	(0)
2017	Montana	4	(0)
2018–2019	Lokomotiv GO	32	(0)
- * Club domestic league appearances and goals as of 1 June 2019

Evgeni Aleksandrov (Bulgarian: Евгени Александров; born 14 June 1988) is a Bulgarian footballer who plays as a goalkeeper.

== Career ==
A Litex Lovech youth graduate, Aleksandrov was promoted to the senior squad for 2007–08 season as a third-choice goalkeeper. He made his debut on 28 May 2011, in the last game of the 2010–11 season in a 0–0 home draw against Kaliakra Kavarna.

On 30 July 2011, Aleksandrov played for Litex in the 2011 Bulgarian Supercup match against CSKA Sofia which was lost 2–1. In the 2011–12 season he earned 6 league appearances and kept two clean sheets. He became a starter for Litex during the 2013–14 season after first choice goalkeeper Ilko Pirgov had sustained an injury. Aleksandrov subsequently lost his status as first choice goalkeeper following the arrival of Vinícius Barrivieira prior to the 2014–15 season.

On 28 December 2016, Aleksandrov signed with Montana for 6 months plus another year as club's option. On 29 December 2017, his contract was terminated by mutual consent.

== Honours ==
=== Club ===
Litex Lovech

- A PFG (2): 2009–10, 2010–11
- Bulgarian Cup (2): 2007–08, 2008–09
- Bulgarian Supercup: 2010
