= Roberto Carboni =

Argentine footballer (born 1985)

Personal information
- Full name: Roberto Eduardo Carboni
- Date of birth: 8 April 1985 (age 41)
- Place of birth: Bernal, Argentina
- Height: 1.72 m (5 ft 8 in)
- Position: Midfielder

Senior career*
Years	Team	Apps	(Gls)
2004	Independiente	11	(2)
2005–2006	All Boys	14	(0)
2006–2007	Estudiantes de Mérida	18	(3)
2007–2008	Deportivo Anzoátegui	23	(8)
2008	Deportivo Cuenca	15	(2)
2009–2010	Chernomorets Burgas	31	(4)
2011	APOP Peyias	9	(1)
2011	Lobos de la BUAP	5	(0)
2012	FBC Melgar	31	(1)
2013	Nacional Potosí	14	(2)
2014	LÁ Firpo	15	(3)
- * Club domestic league appearances and goals as of July 22, 2014

Roberto Eduardo Carboni (born 8 April 1985) is an Argentine retired football player, who last played for LÁ Firpo in El Salvador.

== Career ==
Roberto Carboni is a left midfielder who was born in Bernal and made his debut in professional football, being part of the Club Atlético Independiente squad in the 2004 season. During his first season for Independiente, Carboni played only 2 games. In the summer of 2005, he moved to All Boys in the Primera B Metropolitana, where he played a considerably larger number of matches.

In 2006 Carboni relocated to Venezuela, signing a contract with Estudiantes de Mérida. In season 2007/08, he played for another team of Primera División Venezolana - Deportivo Anzoátegui.

After spending six months of his career in Deportivo Cuenca, Carboni relocated to Europe in January 2009, signing a two-a-half year contract with Bulgarian Chernomorets Burgas. He made his competitive debut for Chernomorets on 7 March 2009 against Botev Plovdiv in the round of 16 of the Bulgarian top division.
