= Ivelin Popov =

Bulgarian footballer (born 1987)

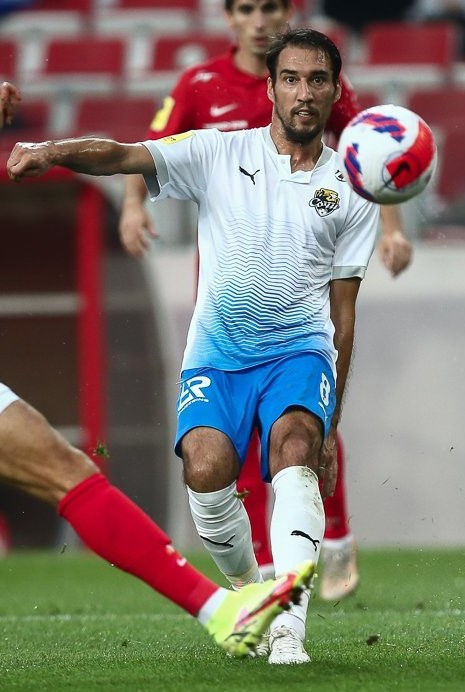
- Popov with Sochi in 2021

Personal information
- Full name: Ivelin Ivanov Popov
- Date of birth: 26 October 1987 (age 39)
- Place of birth: Sofia, Bulgaria
- Height: 1.82 m (6 ft 0 in)
- Positions: Attacking midfielder; second striker; winger

Youth career
- 1993–1998: Septemvri Sofia
- 1999–2004: Levski Sofia
- 2004–2005: Feyenoord

Senior career*
Years	Team	Apps	(Gls)
2005–2010	Litex Lovech	96	(25)
2010–2012	Gaziantepspor	60	(6)
2012–2015	Kuban Krasnodar	79	(19)
2015–2018	Spartak Moscow	77	(6)
2018	→ Rubin Kazan (loan)	9	(4)
2019–2020	Rostov	39	(6)
2020–2022	Sochi	22	(5)
2022–2023	Levski Sofia	31	(5)
2023–2025	Botev Plovdiv	62	(12)
2025–2026	Arda Kardzhali	13	(3)
Total		488	(91)

International career
2006–2008	Bulgaria U21	13	(2)
2007–2019	Bulgaria	90	(18)
- * Club domestic league appearances and goals

Ivelin Ivanov Popov (Bulgarian: Ивелин Иванов Попов; born 26 October 1987) is a Bulgarian former professional footballer who played as an attacking midfielder.

== Club career ==
=== Youth career ===
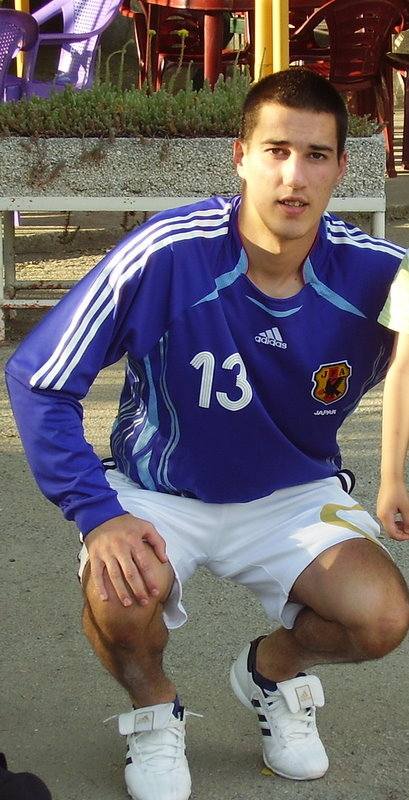
Popov, pictured, in 2008

Born in Sofia, Popov started to play football in Septemvri Sofia's academy. Then he played for the youth formations of Levski Sofia from 1999 to 2004. In 2005, he trained for four months with Feyenoord but did not sign with the team because he was not 18 years old. After that, he returned to Bulgaria and played in a tournament for Beroe's youth team and there he was spotted by the Litex Lovech scouts. On 14 July 2005, he even scored a goal for Beroe in a friendly game.

=== Litex Lovech ===
Popov signed his first professional contract with Litex Lovech in December 2005. He made his European debut in the first leg of Round of 32 Stage in a 0–0 draw against Strasbourg; he made his official debut in the Bulgarian top division in a match against CSKA Sofia on 12 March 2006. He played 59 minutes. The result of the match was a 1–1 draw. On 9 April 2006, he scored his first goal in professional football against Lokomotiv Sofia. The result of the match was a 3–1 win for Litex. The same season, Popov played in 11 matches and scored five goals. In two consecutive seasons, Popov was third placed in the voting for Young player of the year award in 2005–06 and 2006–07 seasons. In the 2007–08 UEFA Cup, Popov scored a brace, in a first leg of second round, in a 3–0 win over Besa Kavajë. Eventually, Litex Lovech advanced to the next round, losing to Hamburger SV in two's leg.

On 18 September 2008, Popov scored a goal in the first round of the UEFA Cup against Aston Villa. In July 2009, Popov was given the captain's armband. At the end of the season, Popov was awarded A League's player of the season after having the most votes in the poll.

In August 2010, he went on trial to Premier League club Blackburn Rovers. He impressed the club, whereafter he received a contract offer, but the move collapsed over his work permit rejected by the British Government, having not played enough international matches.

=== Kuban Krasnodar ===
On 25 August 2012, Popov joined Russian Premier League club Kuban Krasnodar on a three-year contract for an undisclosed fee. According to Chempionat.com, the fee was worth €2 million. He made his debut for the club, coming on as a substitute for Marcos Pizzelli, in a 2–1 win over Dynamo Moscow on 2 September 2012. On 26 October 2012, Popov scored his first goal for the club in a 1–0 win over Rostov. Less than a month later he scored his first brace, putting two goals past Krylia Sovetov and contributing with an assist in a 4–1 home victory. On 13 April 2013, Popov scored a late equalizer in a 2–2 draw away from home to Terek Grozny. On 4 May, he scored a brace as Kuban beat Rostov 2–0 away from home on. On the last day of the 2012–13 season, Popov scored the only goal in a vital 1–0 home victory over Anzhi Makhachkala, securing Kuban a European debut in the Third Qualifying Round of the 2013–14 UEFA Europa League and earning them their best ever finish in the top flight at fifth, having the same points as fourth-placed Spartak Moscow. He finished the season with 9 goals as the club's top goalscorer together with Aras Özbiliz.

Because of his outstanding performance in the 2012–13 season, Popov was appointed captain of Kuban Krasnodar for the 2013–14 season. He captained his team to its first away victory of the season over Russian Premier League newcomer, Tom Tomsk, by contributing with a pair of assists. The match ended with a 2–1 score. His first brace came shortly after, in a historical first ever match in a European championship for Kuban. He netted two goals in a 2–0 away victory over Scottish Premier League runners-up Motherwell in the first leg of a qualifying match for the UEFA Europa League. Both goals were assisted by teammate Ibrahima Baldé. This resulted in his jersey being displayed in the National football museum.

On 28 April 2014, Ivelin Popov scored an away brace against strong Spartak Moscow in a 2–0 victory. This outstanding performance got him voted as player of week 27 in the Russian Premier League. He continued his good run the week after, which saw him providing two assists, marking a 4–0 victory over Krylia Sovetov. The first assist was turned into a goal, scored by fellow Bulgarian teammate Stanislav Manolev, marking his first goal for the club after recently being transferred from PSV Eindhoven. Popov was named man of the match for the second time in a row, earning him a spot in Russian premier league team of the week. He finished his season in Russia having provided 12 assists; making him the joint top assists provider of the season, alongside Danny from Zenit St. Petersburg. He was also included in the team of the season 2013–14, because of his consistency throughout the whole campaign.

=== Spartak Moscow ===
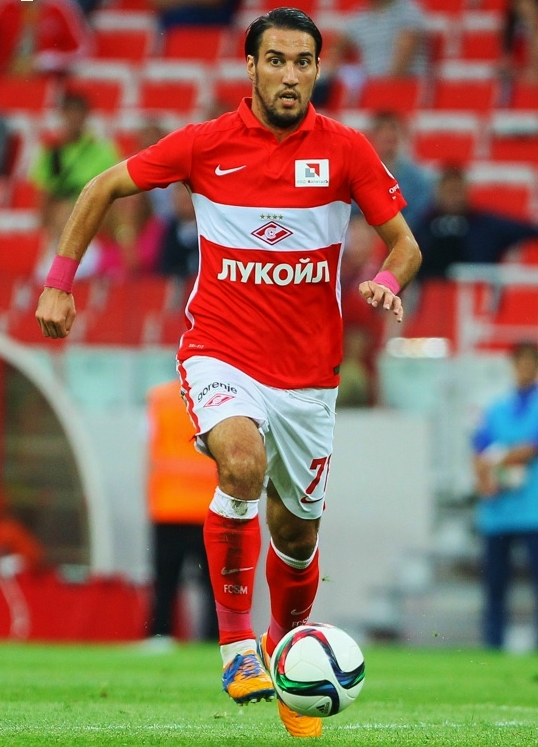
Popov with Spartak in 2015

On 3 June 2015, it was announced that Popov had signed a long-term contract with Spartak Moscow. It was reported that the signing fee cost the club about €7 million. Popov made his league debut for Spartak as a starter in a 2–2 home draw to Ufa on 17 July. He scored his first two official goals for the club on 23 September, in a 7–0 win away to Volga Nizhny Novgorod in the Round of 32 in the Russian Cup. He followed that with his first league goal for the club, coming against Zenit as Spartak drew 2–2 at home. The goal featured a spectacular lob over Zenit defender Javi García, followed by another lob over the goalkeeper Yuri Lodigin. Popov's performance earned him the Best Player award for the tenth round of the 2015–16 Russian Premier League, as well as the most valuable player award for the month of September. He scored for the third consecutive game on 3 October, netting the only goal in a 1–0 win away to Mordovia Saransk.

On 30 April 2017, he provided two assists in a 2–1 away victory over city rivals, CSKA Moscow, which earned him a spot in the Russian Premier League team of the week for matchday 26.

On 8 January 2019, he was released from his Spartak contract by mutual consent.

=== Rubin Kazan ===
On 12 January 2018, he joined FC Rubin Kazan on loan until the end of the 2017–18 season. He scored on his debut for the club, in a 1–1 away draw against Anzhi on 2 March 2018. On 7 April 2018, he scored a brace in a 3–2 home win against Akhmat, which saw him being named Man of the Match for the second match in a row.

=== Rostov ===
On 24 January 2019, he signed a 2.5-year contract with Russian club FC Rostov.

=== Sochi ===
On 23 August 2020, he moved to another Russian club PFC Sochi in exchange for Dmitry Poloz moving the other way.

=== Levski Sofia ===
On 28 April 2022, Popov signed a two-year contract with Levski Sofia beginning from the 2022–23 season, thus returning to his home country after 12 years.

=== Botev Plovdiv ===
On 15 August 2023, Popov moved to Botev Plovdiv from Levski Sofia after terminating his contract, thus joining as a free agent.

== International career ==
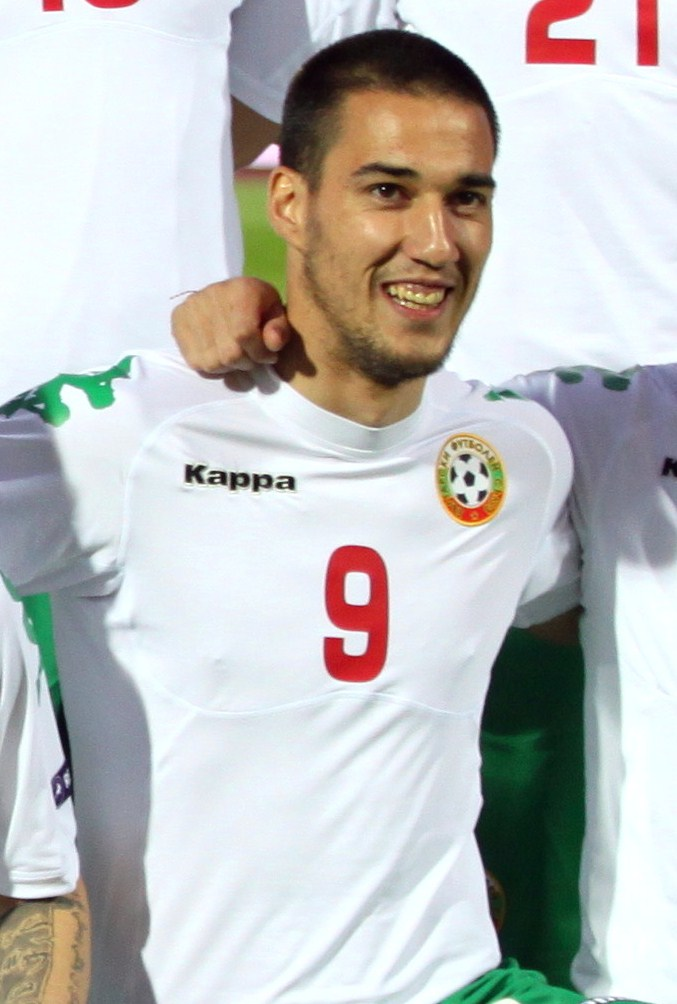
Popov with Bulgaria in 2011

In August 2007, Dimitar Penev called-up Popov in the Bulgaria national team for the friendly match with Wales. On 11 February 2009, he scored his first goal for Bulgaria against Switzerland. On 2 April 2009, Popov scored the first of two goals for Bulgaria in the 2–0 win against Cyprus. On 17 September 2010, during a friendly match against Serbia, he became the youngest player to captain the national side. On 9 February 2011, Popov scored twice from the penalty spot in a 2–2 friendly draw with Estonia, but the result was subsequently declared void by FIFA and expunged from the records due to suspicions of match fixing with the involvement of the game officials. He captained the national team during the 2014 FIFA World Cup qualification, providing his team with two goals, including a 25-yard free kick goal against Armenia, throughout a tough campaign, having to face strong national teams like those of Italy, the Czech Republic and Denmark.

In 2015, Popov was a crucial figure in the 2–2 home draw versus Italy. He hit the back of the net to tie the score at 1–1 in the 11th minute, raising the spirits of his compatriots after a disappointing own-goal in the 4th minute. This resulted in a series of swift attacks from the home team which saw them grab the lead in the 17th minute. They were able to keep their lead until the 84th minute, but in the end had to settle for a 2–2 draw after a late equalizer. In the next official match, he once again proved his worth after the only goal in a tough but decisive 0–1 away win against Malta, keeping the hopes alive of his national team qualifying for Euro 2016.

On 31 August 2017, Ivelin Popov provided two decisive assists in a 3–2 home win against Sweden. He announced his retirement from international football in November 2019.

== Controversies ==
Popov's name became associated with scandal early in his career and became synonymous with irresponsibility and lack of discipline. In April 2007, he was removed from Litex's starting roster due to bad form.

In September 2008, Popov was banned from the youth national team following an incident on the team bus, where he threw a bottle at the bus driver–-hitting him on the head–-who then lost control, narrowly avoiding a crash.

In September 2010, just days before the Euro 2012 qualifier against England, Popov led a group of teammates out of the training camp in Pravets and took them to Botevgrad so they could celebrate Valeri Bojinov's birthday, where the players consumed large amounts of alcohol. Days later, Bulgaria lost to England 4–0. In September 2011, as Bulgaria was preparing to host England for the second leg of the Euro 2012 qualifier, Popov again led a group of players to a bar, where they drank until 4 am, angering then coach Lothar Matthäus. Bulgaria lost to England 3–0 at home.

On 16 November 2014, Popov missed a penalty against Malta in a Euro 2016 qualifier, allowing for the match to end in a 1–1 draw. Following the game, Popov was accused of missing the penalty on purpose. Days later, it came to light that Popov had abused and humiliated the national team masseuse on several occasions, forcing him to do pushups in front of the other players. At this point, the executive committee of the Bulgarian Football Union had seen enough and proceeded to ban Popov from the national team for life.

In 2015, newly appointed head coach Ivaylo Petev reinstated Popov to the squad. The captain's band, however, went to midfielder Svetoslav Dyakov.

== Career statistics ==
=== Club ===
As of match played 24 October 2025

Appearances and goals by club, season and competition
Club	Season	League			Cup (Note: Includes appearances in League Cup and Super Cup)		Europe		Total	
Club	Season	Division	Apps	Goals	Apps	Goals	Apps	Goals	Apps	Goals
Litex Lovech	2005–06	A Group	9	5	2	0	1	0	12	5
Litex Lovech	2006–07	A Group	19	1	0	0	2	0	21	1
Litex Lovech	2007–08	A Group	25	10	4	1	6	5	35	16
Litex Lovech	2008–09	A Group	22	3	3	4	4	2	29	9
Litex Lovech	2009–10	A Group	18	6	1	0	0	0	19	6
Litex Lovech	2010–11	A Group	3	0	0	0	4	1	4	1
Litex Lovech	Total		96	25	10	5	17	8	123	38
Gaziantepspor	2010–11	Süper Lig	28	2	8	3	–	–	36	5
Gaziantepspor	2011–12	Süper Lig	32	4	1	2	4	1	37	7
Gaziantepspor	Total		60	6	9	5	4	1	73	12
Kuban Krasnodar	2012–13	Russian Premier League	23	9	3	0	–	–	26	9
Kuban Krasnodar	2013–14	Russian Premier League	29	6	0	0	8	3	37	9
Kuban Krasnodar	2014–15	Russian Premier League	27	4	5	1	0	0	32	5
Kuban Krasnodar	Total		79	19	8	1	8	3	95	23
Spartak Moscow	2015–16	Russian Premier League	29	4	2	2	–	–	31	6
Spartak Moscow	2016–17	Russian Premier League	22	2	1	0	1	0	24	2
Spartak Moscow	2017–18	Russian Premier League	13	0	3	0	5	0	21	0
Spartak Moscow	2018–19	Russian Premier League	13	0	2	0	6	1	21	1
Spartak Moscow	Total		77	6	8	2	12	1	97	9
Rubin Kazan (loan)	2017–18	Russian Premier League	9	4	0	0	0	0	9	4
Rostov	2018–19	Russian Premier League	12	1	3	2	–	–	15	3
Rostov	2019–20	Russian Premier League	25	5	2	1	–	–	27	6
Rostov	2020–21	Russian Premier League	2	0	0	0	0	0	2	0
Rostov	Total		39	6	5	3	0	0	44	9
Sochi	2020–21	Russian Premier League	1	0	0	0	–	–	1	0
Sochi	2021–22	Russian Premier League	21	5	1	0	3	0	25	5
Sochi	Total		22	5	1	0	3	0	26	5
Levski Sofia	2022–23	First League	27	5	3	0	1	0	31	5
Levski Sofia	2023–24	First League	4	0	0	0	2	0	6	0
Levski Sofia	Total		31	5	3	0	3	0	37	5
Botev Plovdiv	2023–24	First League	24	6	6	2	–	–	30	8
Botev Plovdiv	2024–25	First League	33	6	3	1	6 (Note: Two appearances in UEFA Europa League, four appearances in UEFA Conference League)	0	42	7
Botev Plovdiv	2025–26	First League	5	0	0	0	–	–	5	0
Botev Plovdiv	Total		62	12	9	3	6	0	77	15
Arda Kardzhali	2025–26	First League	5	1	0	0	–	–	5	1
Career total			501	90	53	19	53	13	603	122

=== International ===
Appearances and goals by national team and year
National team	Year	Apps	Goals
Bulgaria	2007	4	0
Bulgaria	2008	4	0
Bulgaria	2009	4	2
Bulgaria	2010	9	2
Bulgaria	2011	7	3
Bulgaria	2012	9	1
Bulgaria	2013	9	2
Bulgaria	2014	5	0
Bulgaria	2015	7	2
Bulgaria	2016	8	2
Bulgaria	2017	6	1
Bulgaria	2018	8	1
Bulgaria	2019	10	2
Total		90	18

Scores and results list Bulgaria's goal tally first, score column indicates score after each Popov goal.

List of international goals scored by Ivelin Popov
No.	Date	Venue	Opponent	Score	Result	Competition
1	11 February 2009	Stade de Genève, Geneva, Switzerland	Switzerland	1–0	1–1	Friendly
2	1 April 2009	Vasil Levski National Stadium, Sofia, Bulgaria	Cyprus	1–0	2–0	2010 FIFA World Cup qualification
3	19 May 2010	King Baudouin Stadium, Brussels, Belgium	Belgium	1–0	1–2	Friendly
4	8 October 2010	Cardiff City Stadium, Cardiff, Wales	Wales	1–0	1–0	UEFA Euro 2012 qualification
5	9 February 2011	Lilleküla Stadium, Tallinn,	Estonia	1–1	2–2	Friendly
6	9 February 2011	Lilleküla Stadium, Tallinn,	Estonia	2–2	2–2	Friendly
7	4 June 2011	City Stadium, Podgorica, Montenegro	Montenegro	1–1	1–1	UEFA Euro 2012 qualification
8	26 May 2012	Amsterdam Arena, Amsterdam, Netherlands	Netherlands	1–0	2–1	Friendly
9	22 March 2013	Vasil Levski National Stadium, Sofia, Bulgaria	Malta	3–0	6–0	2014 FIFA World Cup qualification
10	11 October 2013	Vazgen Sargsyan Republican Stadium, Yerevan, Armenia	Armenia	1–1	1–2	2014 FIFA World Cup qualification
11	28 March 2015	Vasil Levski National Stadium, Sofia, Bulgaria	Italy	1–1	2–2	UEFA Euro 2016 qualification
12	12 June 2015	Ta' Qali National Stadium, Mdina, Malta	Malta	1–0	1–0	UEFA Euro 2016 qualification
13	6 September 2016	Vasil Levski National Stadium, Sofia, Bulgaria	Luxembourg	3–2	4–3	2018 FIFA World Cup qualification
14	13 November 2016	Vasil Levski National Stadium, Sofia, Bulgaria	Belarus	1–0	1–0	2018 FIFA World Cup qualification
15	13 November 2017	Estádio do Restelo, Lisbon, Portugal	Saudi Arabia	1–0	1–0	Friendly
16	26 March 2018	Pancho Aréna, Felcsút, Hungary	Kazakhstan	1–0	2–1	Friendly
17	10 June 2019	Vasil Levski National Stadium, Sofia, Bulgaria	Kosovo	1–1	2–3	UEFA Euro 2020 qualification
18	10 September 2019	Aviva Stadium, Dublin, Republic of Ireland	Republic of Ireland	1–1	1–3	Friendly

== Honours ==
Litex Lovech

- Bulgarian Cup: 2007–08, 2008–09
- Bulgarian Supercup: 2010

Spartak Moscow

- Russian Premier League: 2016–17
- Russian Super Cup: 2017

Botev Plovdiv

- Bulgarian Cup: 2023–24

Individual

- Bulgarian Players' Player of the Year: 2009–10
- Bulgarian Footballer of the Year: 2015, 2016, 2017
- List of 33 top players of the Russian league: 2013–14
- Russian Premier League Player of the Month: September 2015
