= Teodor Skorchev =

Bulgarian footballer

Personal information
- Full name: Teodor Marinov Skorchev
- Date of birth: 4 September 1986 (age 40)
- Place of birth: Plovdiv, Bulgaria
- Height: 1.83 m (6 ft 0 in)
- Position: Goalkeeper

Senior career*
Years	Team	Apps	(Gls)
2006–2009	Maritsa Plovdiv	41	(0)
- → Brestnik 1948 (loan)
2009–2013	Beroe Stara Zagora	27	(0)
2013–2014	Ethnikos Alexandroupoli	?	(?)
2014–2015	Lokomotiv Plovdiv	9	(0)
- * Club domestic league appearances and goals as of 15 December 2015

Teodor Marinov Skorchev (Bulgarian: Tеодор Маринов Скорчев; born 4 September 1986) is a Bulgarian footballer who plays as a goalkeeper.

== Honours ==
=== Club ===
- Beroe
  - Bulgarian Cup (2): 2009-10, 2012–13
