= Florin Bratu =

Romanian footballer and coach

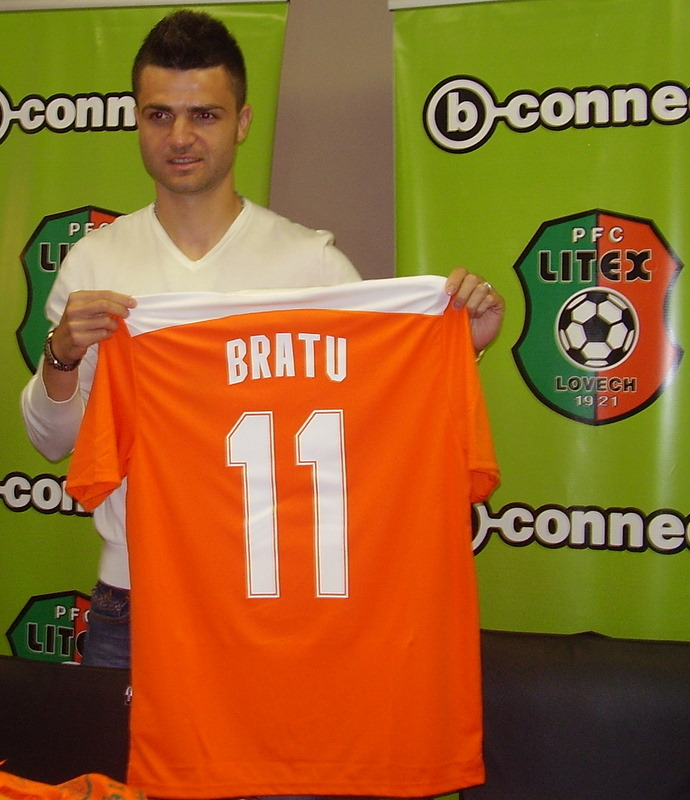
- Bratu in 2010

Personal information
- Full name: Florin Daniel Bratu
- Date of birth: 2 January 1980 (age 46)
- Place of birth: Bucharest, Romania
- Height: 1.86 m (6 ft 1 in)
- Position: Forward

Youth career
- 1988–1991: Voința București
- 1991–1992: Dinamo București
- 1992–2000: Rapid București

Senior career*
Years	Team	Apps	(Gls)
2000–2003	Rapid București	48	(15)
2000–2001	→ Tractorul Brașov (loan)	27	(8)
2003–2004	Galatasaray	25	(6)
2004–2007	Nantes	13	(2)
2005–2006	→ Dinamo București (loan)	23	(6)
2006–2007	→ Valenciennes (loan)	22	(1)
2007–2010	Dinamo București	44	(22)
2010	→ Litex Lovech (loan)	7	(2)
2011–2012	Gaz Metan Mediaș	11	(1)
2012	Gloria Bistrița	9	(1)
Total		229	(64)

International career
2001–2002	Romania U21	5	(3)
2003–2008	Romania	15	(2)

Managerial career
- 2014–2015: Dinamo București II
- 2015–2016: Tunari
- 2016–2017: Dinamo București U19
- 2017–2018: Romania U18
- 2018: Dinamo București
- 2018–2019: Aerostar Bacău
- 2019: Turris Turnu Măgurele
- 2020: Concordia Chiajna
- 2021–2022: Romania U21
- 2023: Karmiotissa
- 2024–2026: CS Dinamo București
- 2026: Metaloglobus București
- 2026: Partizani
- * Club domestic league appearances and goals

Florin Daniel Bratu (born 2 January 1980) is a Romanian professional football manager and former player.

== Early life and youth career ==
Bratu was born on 2 January 1980 in Bucharest, Romania where in 1986, he started to play tennis for a year and a half, afterwards switching to football, playing a few years with the junior squads of Voința București. Then he moved for about one year at his childhood favorite team, Dinamo București where he was coached by Iosif Varga. As he was unsatisfied with the poor training conditions that were at Dinamo during that time, in 1992 after seeing an article in Gazeta Sporturilor that Rapid București was organizing trials, he went there and got accepted after impressing the coach with his speeding ability.

== Club career ==
=== Rapid, Tractorul and Galatasaray ===
Shortly after joining Rapid's senior squad, Bratu was loaned to Divizia B club Tractorul Brașov in 2000 where, in his only season spent at the club, he scored eight goals in 27 league games. He then returned to Rapid, and on 5 August 2001, made his Divizia A debut under coach Viorel Hizo in a 3–0 away victory against UM Timișoara. By the end of the season, he won the first trophy of his career, the 2001–02 Cupa României, where in the 2–1 victory against Dinamo in the final, coach Mircea Rednic used him as a starter until the 68th minute, when he was substituted by Dennis Șerban.

In the following season, Rednic had Bratu form a partnership in the offence with Daniel Niculae, and the team's first achievement was winning the 2002 Supercupa României, with Bratu opening the scoring in the 2–1 victory against Dinamo. They finished the season champions, and Bratu was the team's top-scorer with 11 goals in 27 matches. In 2003, Bratu began his season at Rapid by winning another Supercupa României, a match where Rednic utilized him until the 68th minute before replacing him with Robert Niță, who subsequently scored the decisive goal in the 1–0 victory over Dinamo. Bratu also netted a goal against Anderlecht during the second leg of the 2003–04 Champions League, helping Rapid secure a 2–0 halftime lead before the team ultimately failed to qualify after losing the match 3–2.

In September 2003, Turkish club Galatasaray announced they had reached an agreement with Rapid for the transfer of Bratu, who agreed to a four-year deal, with Galatasaray paying Rapid $2.75 million. His debut in the Süper Lig took place on 13 September, and he played the entire match under coach Fatih Terim in a 1–0 away loss to Konyaspor. He scored his first goal in the competition on 4 October in a 4–3 victory against Akçaabat Sebatspor. Bratu eventually spent only one season alongside compatriots Gabriel Tamaș and Ovidiu Petre with the Cim Bom Bom side, being used regularly by Terim, but when fellow Romanian Gheorghe Hagi came as head coach to the club, he played less frequently.

=== Nantes and loans ===
In July 2004, Galatasaray sold him to French side Nantes for €2.5 million, signing a four-year contract. Bratu made his Ligue 1 debut on 7 August, as coach Loïc Amisse used him as a starter in a 1–0 away loss to Metz. Until the end of the season, he netted two league goals in two away losses to AS Monaco and Caen. He spent only one season with The Canaries, claiming he had problems adapting to French football's reliance on physical strength.

In 2005 Nantes wanted to loan him to Romania, so Bratu went to train with his former club Rapid București for a few weeks, but they did not want to keep him because they considered they had enough forwards in the squad. Thus he went to play for Dinamo București where in his first game, coach Ioan Andone used him as a starter and he scored a goal in the 3–2 victory against rivals Steaua București which helped the club earn its first Supercupa României. He also played in eight games in the 2005–06 UEFA Cup campaign when the team eliminated Everton against whom he scored a double in a historical 5–2 win on aggregate, reaching the group stage.

In 2006 Bratu returned to Ligue 1 football, playing one season for Valenciennes on loan from Nantes, scoring his only goal for them in the last round of the season, a 3–1 loss to Auxerre. He has a total of 35 appearances with three goals netted in the French league.

=== Dinamo and Litex ===
In June 2007, Bratu was signed by Dinamo București from Nantes for a €700,000 fee, reuniting with his former coach from Rapid, Mircea Rednic, with the objective of reaching the Champions League group stage. He scored a goal in the second leg of the third qualifying round against Lazio after a prolonged sprint, leaving his opponent Guglielmo Stendardo behind and defeating Marco Ballotta with a precise shot, but they failed to qualify, losing 4–2 on aggregate. Bratu formed a partnership in Dinamo's offence with Ionel Dănciulescu, and the Romanian press called them "BD in action", a nickname inspired by the first letters of their family names and the Romanian movie "BD in action". By the end of the 2007–08 season, the team had no chance of winning the title, but rivals Steaua were in first position, having scheduled a match on Dinamo's ground. The match ended with a 2–1 victory for Dinamo with Bratu scoring a goal and providing an assist to the one netted by Dănciulescu. After Bratu scored his goal from a penalty, he celebrated by taking the corner flag and "machine-gunning" Steaua's fans with it, thus earning the nickname "Mitraliera" (the machine gun). That victory helped CFR Cluj advance to the first position and become champions after the final round of the season.

In the following season, after 10 games Dinamo was in first position, with Bratu in good shape, as he scored six goals. However, in the 32nd minute of a match against CFR Cluj, due to the difficult terrain and after a duel with the strong Álvaro Pereira, Bratu suffered a sprained knee, with damage to the cruciate ligaments which kept him off the field for about one year. He was unable to fully recover after that, and Dinamo eventually lost the title that season.

In the summer of 2010, Bratu joined Litex Lovech on loan from Dinamo. His debut in the Bulgarian league took place on 31 July under coach Angel Chervenkov, when he opened the scoring in a 2–1 home win over Minyor Pernik. He scored a brace to help his side get past Rudar Pljevlja in the 2010–11 Champions League second qualifying round before they were defeated by Žilina in the following round. His stint with Litex lasted until December 2010, during which the team won a Bulgarian Supercup.

=== Late career ===
In January 2011, Bratu signed for Liga I team Gaz Metan Mediaș where he spent a year and a half, playing only 11 league games there, scoring one goal in August 2011 against Voința Sibiu. In the summer of 2012, Bratu signed a one-year contract with Gloria Bistrița. He made his last Liga I appearance on 2 November 2012 in Gloria's 1–1 draw against Viitorul Constanța, totaling 135 matches with 45 goals in the competition.

== International career ==
Bratu played 14 games and scored two goals for Romania, making his debut on 12 February 2003 when coach Anghel Iordănescu sent him in the 90+2nd minute to replace Adrian Mutu in a 2–1 friendly victory against Slovakia. He scored his first goal in a friendly which ended in a 1–0 win over Lithuania. Bratu appeared in four games and scored one goal in a 4–0 victory against Luxembourg in the Euro 2004 qualifiers. He also played one game in the 2006 World Cup qualifiers, one in the Euro 2008 qualifiers and two during the 2010 World Cup qualifiers.

== After retirement ==
Since retiring from football in the middle of the 2012–13 season, Bratu has gone into punditry and worked for a while as a commentator for Digi Sport.

In March 2014, Bratu became the head of the scouting department at his former club Dinamo București.

== Managerial career ==
In August 2014, Bratu started his coaching career as head coach at Dinamo București II in Liga III. One year later, he moved to Tunari in the same league, and in 2016, he took charge of Dinamo București's under-19 team, winning the 2017 Liga Elitelor. Subsequently, Bratu continued to work with juniors as he led Romania's under-18 national team from 2017 to 2018.

On 25 February 2018, Bratu was appointed head coach of Liga I club Dinamo București. He was sacked in September 2018, following three consecutive defeats, and replaced by Claudiu Niculescu. Afterwards, he worked for several teams in Liga II such as Aerostar Bacău, Turris Turnu Măgurele and Concordia Chiajna.

On 9 August 2021, he was named the head coach of Romania U21. One year later, he was dismissed after the team earned two victories, two draws and four losses during his tenure. In March 2023, Bratu became the head coach of Cypriot First Division club Karmiotissa, where he had compatriot Răzvan Grădinaru as one of his players. He managed to help them avoid relegation at the end of the season. However, in September 2024, he left the club after earning a single point in the first five rounds of the 2023–24 season.

In August 2024, Bratu took over third league team CS Dinamo București. He helped them gain promotion to the second league at the end of the 2024–25 season. In March 2026, Bratu left CS Dinamo to take charge of first league club Metaloglobus București. He left Metaloglobus after failing to help them avoid relegation at the end of the 2025–26 season.

On 6 July 2026, Bratu was appointed as manager of Partizani Tirana on a one-year contract with an option for a further year.

== Career statistics ==
=== Club ===
Appearances and goals by club, season and competition
Club	Season	Division	League		National cup		Europe		Other		Total	
Club	Season	Division	Apps	Goals	Apps	Goals	Apps	Goals	Apps	Goals	Apps	Goals
Tractorul Brașov	2000–01	Divizia B	27	8			–		–		27	8
Rapid București	2001–02	Divizia A	18	2	5	3	4 (Note: Appearances in the UEFA Cup)	1	–		27	6
Rapid București	2002–03	Divizia A	27	11	2	0	4	0	1 (Note: Appearance in the Supercupa României)	1	34	12
Rapid București	2003–04	Divizia A	3	2	0	0	2 (Note: Appearances in the UEFA Champions League)	1	1	0	6	3
Rapid București	Total		48	15	7	3	10	2	2	1	67	21
Galatasaray	2003–04	Süper Lig	25	6	2	1	0	0	–		27	7
Nantes	2004–05	Ligue 1	13	2	0	0	2 (Note: Appearances in the Intertoto Cup)	0	2 (Note: Appearances in the Coupe de la Ligue)	0	17	2
Dinamo București	2005–06	Divizia A	23	6	2	0	8	2	1	1	34	9
Valenciennes	2006–07	Ligue 1	22	1	2	0	–		–		24	1
Dinamo București	2007–08	Liga I	28	14	3	2	3 (Note: One appearance with one goal scored in the UEFA Champions League and two appearances in the UEFA Cup)	1	1	0	35	17
Dinamo București	2008–09	Liga I	10	7	1	0	2	0	–		13	7
Dinamo București	2009–10	Liga I	6	1	1	0	0	0	–		7	1
Dinamo București	Total		44	22	5	2	5	1	1	0	55	25
Litex Lovech	2010–11	A PFG	7	2	1	1	5 (Note: Four appearances with two goals scored in the UEFA Champions League and one appearance in the UEFA Europa League)	2	–		13	5
Gaz Metan Mediaș	2010–11	Liga I	5	0	0	0	–		–		5	0
Gaz Metan Mediaș	2011–12	Liga I	6	1	1	0	1 (Note: Appearance in the UEFA Europa League)	0	–		8	1
Gaz Metan Mediaș	Total		11	1	1	0	1	0	–		13	1
Gloria Bistrița	2012–13	Liga I	9	1	1	0	–		–		10	1
Career total			229	64	21	7	31	7	6	2	287	80

=== International ===
Appearances and goals by national team and year
National team	Year	Apps	Goals
Romania	2003	9	2
Romania	2004	2	0
Romania	2007	1	0
Romania	2008	3	0
Total		15	2

Scores and results list Romania's goal tally first, score column indicates score after each Bratu goal.

List of international goals scored by Florin Bratu
#	Date	Venue	Cap	Opponent	Score	Result	Competition
1	30 April 2003	Darius and Girėnas Stadium, Kaunas, Lithuania	3	Lithuania	1–0	1–0	Friendly
2	6 September 2003	Stadionul Astra, Ploiești, Romania	5	Luxembourg	4–0	4–0	Euro 2004 qualifiers

== Managerial statistics ==
As of 20 September 2026

Team	From	To	Record							
Team	From	To	G	W	D	L	GF	GA	GD	Win %
Dinamo II București	20 August 2014	14 June 2015	27	14	2	11	48	43	+5	51.85
Tunari	13 July 2015	6 July 2016	25	5	5	15	33	55	−22	20.00
Romania U18	12 July 2017	28 January 2018	5	0	3	2	4	7	−3	0.00
Dinamo București	25 February 2018	23 September 2018	24	14	2	8	41	28	+13	58.33
Aerostar Bacău	17 October 2018	6 May 2019	21	7	3	11	38	33	+5	33.33
Turris Turnu Măgurele	3 October 2019	22 October 2019	4	1	1	2	5	6	−1	25.00
Concordia Chiajna	8 January 2020	6 November 2020	14	5	3	6	23	22	+1	35.71
Romania U21	9 August 2021	15 August 2022	8	2	2	4	12	17	−5	25.00
Karmiotissa	25 March 2023	24 September 2023	16	5	4	7	14	22	−8	31.25
CS Dinamo București	5 August 2024	3 March 2026	57	25	12	20	88	82	+6	43.86
Metaloglobus București	4 March 2026	15 June 2026	10	2	5	3	12	16	−4	20.00
Partizani Tirana	6 July 2026	10 October 2026	6	1	1	4	8	13	−5	16.67
Total			216	81	43	92	325	341	−16	37.50

== Honours ==
=== Player ===
Rapid București

- Divizia A: 2002–03
- Cupa României: 2001–02
- Supercupa României: 2002, 2003

Dinamo București

- Supercupa României: 2005

Litex Lovech

- Bulgarian Supercup: 2010

=== Manager ===
CS Dinamo București

- Liga III: 2024–25
