= Uroš Golubović =

Serbian footballer

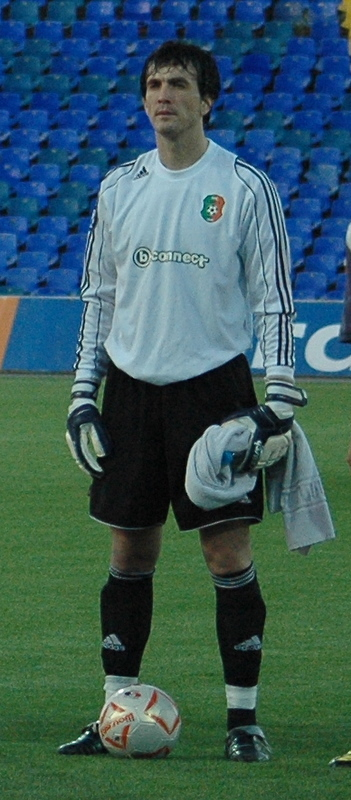
- Golubović with Litex Lovech in 2009

Personal information
- Full name: Uroš Golubović
- Date of birth: 19 August 1976 (age 50)
- Place of birth: Belgrade, SFR Yugoslavia
- Height: 1.90 m (6 ft 3 in)
- Position: Goalkeeper

Senior career*
Years	Team	Apps	(Gls)
1995–1996	IMR		
1997–2002	Rad	32+	(0)
2002–2003	Leotar	8	(0)
2003–2004	Spartak Varna	22	(0)
2004–2008	Lokomotiv Sofia	104	(0)
2008–2011	Litex Lovech	42	(0)
2011–2013	Ludogorets Razgrad	34	(0)
Total		242+	(0)
- * Club domestic league appearances and goals

Uroš Golubović (Serbian Cyrillic: Урош Голубовић; born 19 August 1976) is a Serbian retired footballer who played as a goalkeeper.

== Career ==
In the 1995–96 season, Golubović was a regular member of IMR in the Serbian League Belgrade. He subsequently played for Rad in the First League of FR Yugoslavia until the end of the 2001–02 season. Afterwards, Golubović moved to Bosnia and Herzegovina and signed with Leotar, helping the club win the national championship in the 2002–03 season.

In the summer of 2003, Golubović moved to Bulgaria and joined Spartak Varna. He played regularly for the side that season, before switching to fellow Bulgarian club Lokomotiv Sofia in the summer of 2004. Over the next four seasons, Golubović amassed over 100 league appearances and helped the side qualify for the UEFA Cup twice in a row (2006–07 and 2007–08). He subsequently spent three years at Litex Lovech, winning two consecutive championships (2009–10 and 2010–11), one Bulgarian Cup, and one Bulgarian Supercup. In the summer of 2011, Golubović signed for newly promoted Ludogorets Razgrad. He spent two seasons at the club, winning the league on both occasions and adding one more Cup (2011–12) and Supercup (2012) to his collection.

== Honours ==
Leotar

- Premier League of Bosnia and Herzegovina: 2002–03

Litex Lovech

- Bulgarian First League: 2009–10, 2010–11
- Bulgarian Cup: 2008–09
- Bulgarian Supercup: 2010

Ludogorets Razgrad

- Bulgarian First League: 2011–12, 2012–13
- Bulgarian Cup: 2011–12
- Bulgarian Supercup: 2012
