= Gradski stadion (Lovech) =

Football stadium in Lovech, Bulgaria

- City Stadium of Lovech
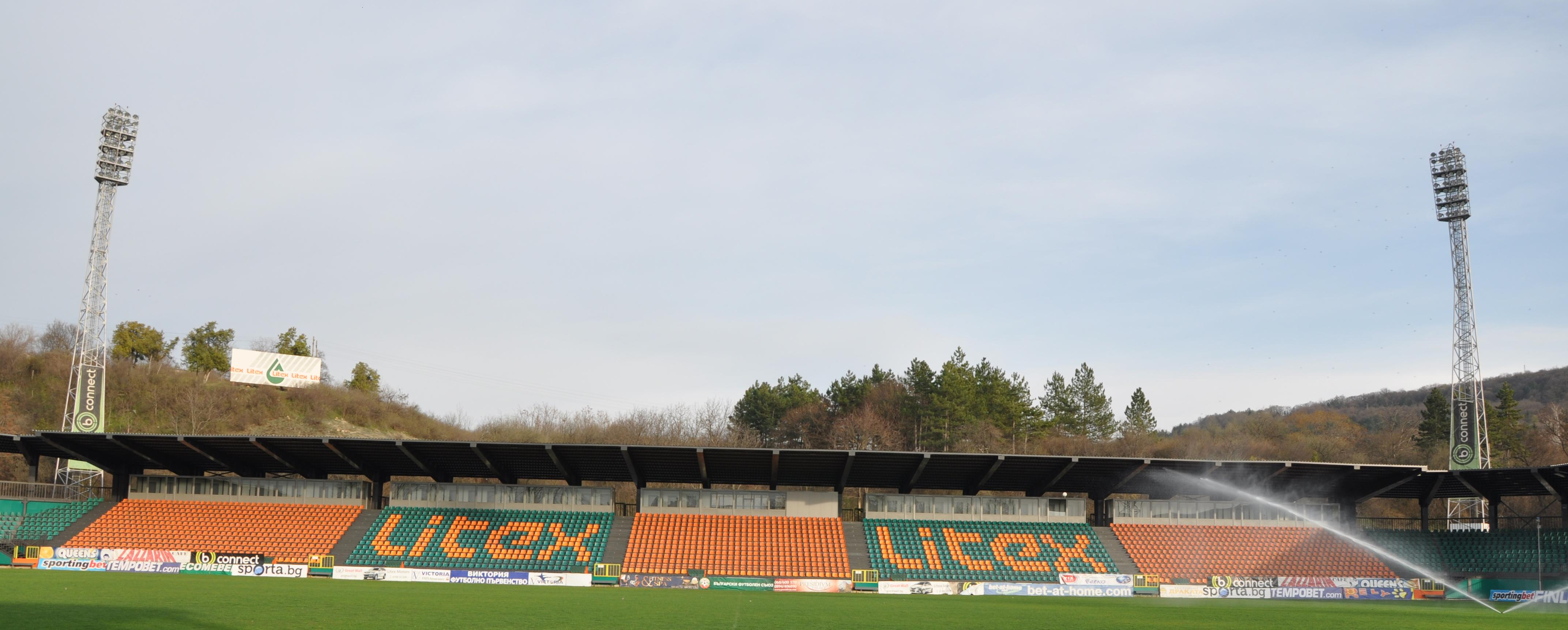
- UEFA Category 3 Stadium
- Interactive map of Gradski stadion
- Full name: Gradski stadion Lovech
- Former names: Stadion Hristo Karpachev
- Location: Lovech, Bulgaria
- Coordinates: 43°8′33.50″N 24°43′29.50″E
- Owner: Litex Commerce JSC
- Operator: Lovech Municipality
- Capacity: 8,100
- Surface: Grass
- Field size: 105 X 68

Construction
- Groundbreaking: 1961
- Built: 1961 - 1962
- Opened: 1962
- Renovated: 1999, 2011
- Expanded: 1999, 2011

Tenants
- FC Lovech (1962–); PFC Litex Lovech II (2015–2016)

Gradski stadion (Bulgarian: Градски стадион, lit. ''City Stadium'') is a football stadium in Lovech, Bulgaria. It is currently used for football matches and is the home of local team Lovech. The stadium has more than 8,100 seats. On July 12, 2010, the venue received a 3-star rating by UEFA and currently meets the UEFA guidelines to host Champions League and Europa League matches. The record attendance of the stadium was achieved at the game between Levski Sofia and Litex Lovech in 1997, a Bulgarian cup match, where Litex won 2-0 - in front of 12,500 spectators. The most visited European match was against Aston Villa in 2008, where 8000 spectators attended.

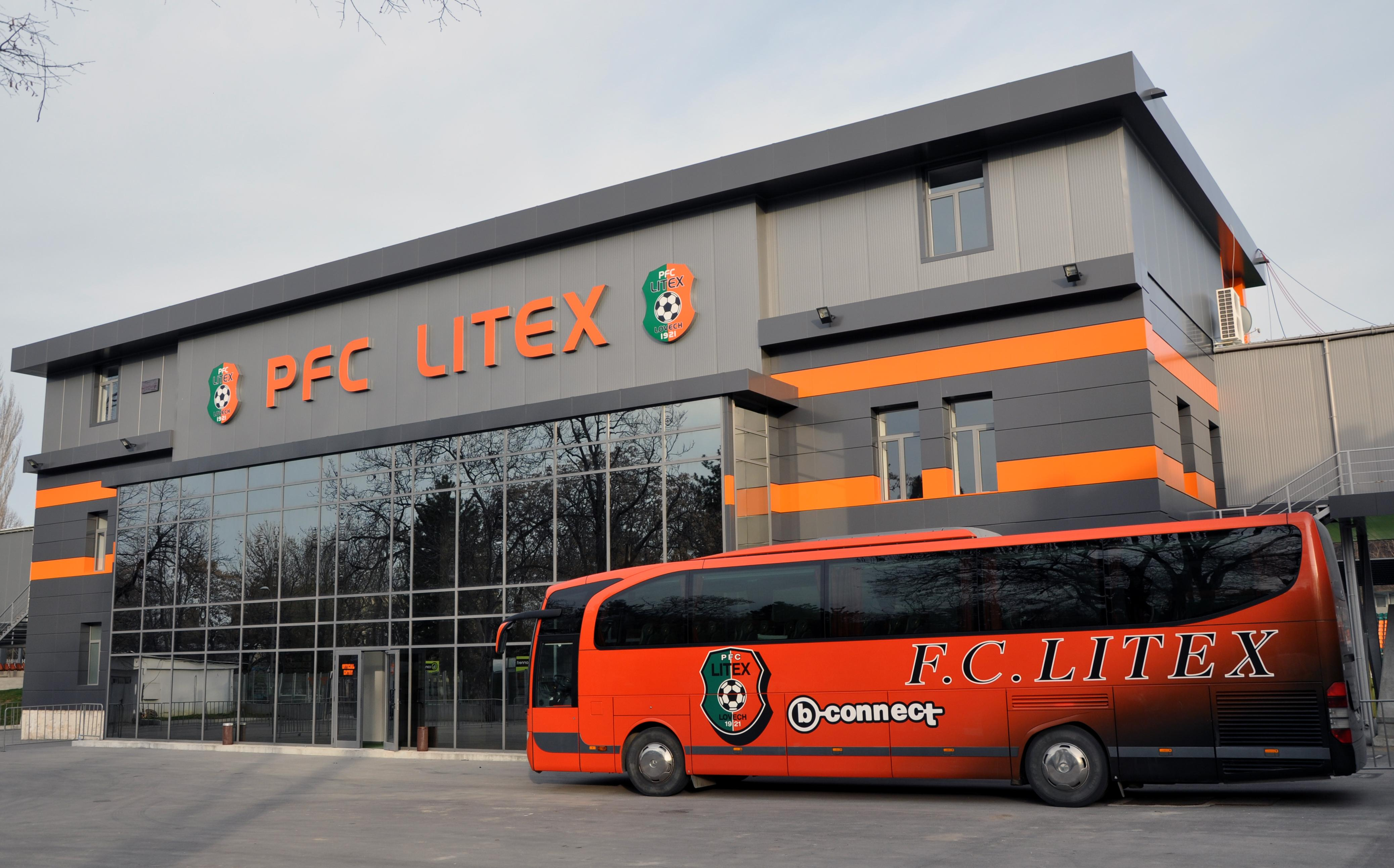
City Stadium of Lovech

In 2010, right after the end of the 2009-10 season of the A PFG, the stadium was totally reconstructed to meet the UEFA rules for a 3-star UEFA stadium, in order to host the home matches of Litex Lovech in the 2010-11 UEFA Champions League. The reconstructions of the stadium started on May 12, 2010 and finished on July 10, at a total cost of €3 million.

Summer of 2011 renovations of the stadium continued as the main stand was demolished and a new one constructed.
