= Vinícius (footballer, born 1985) =

Brazilian footballer

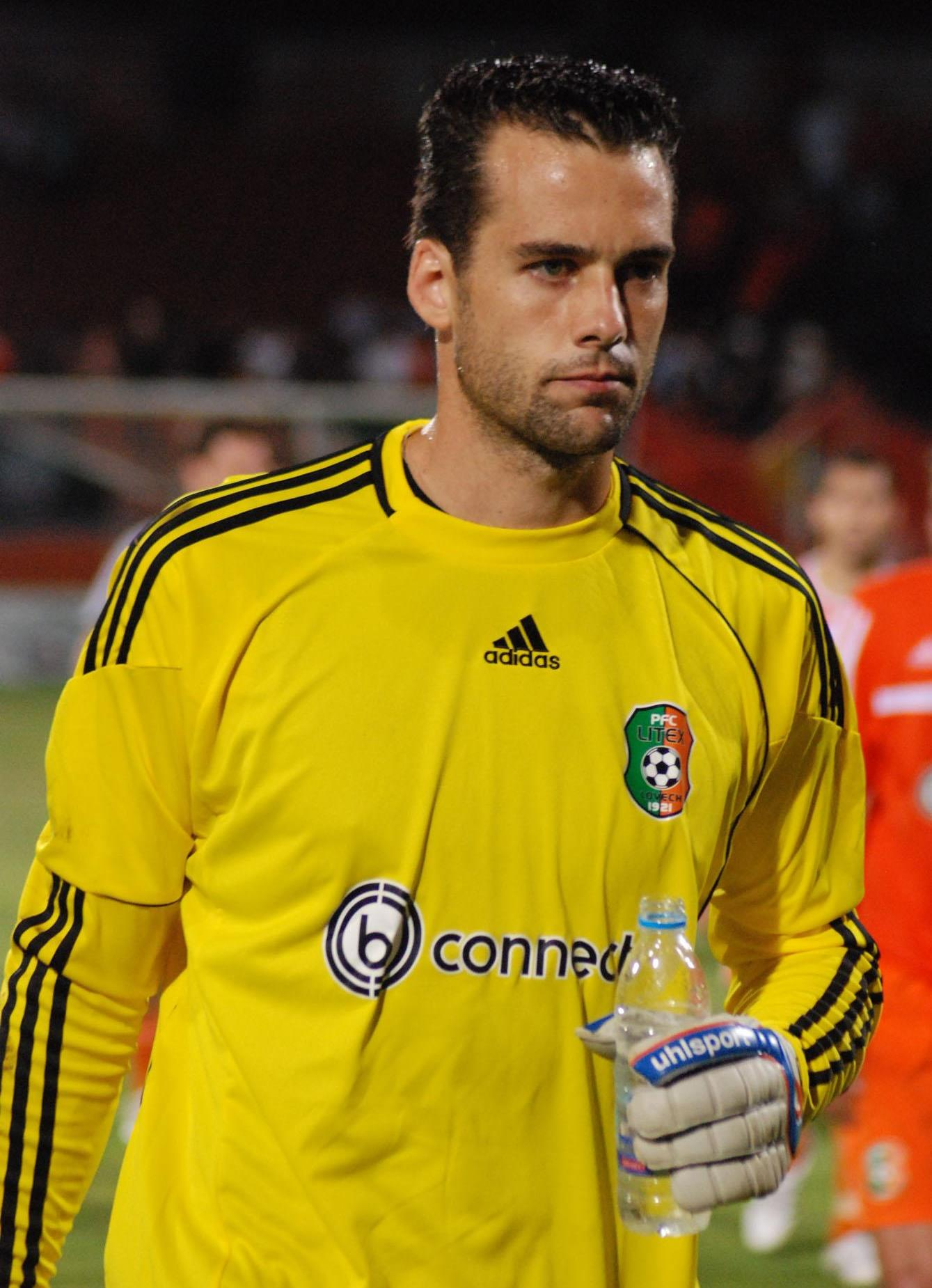

Personal information
- Full name: Vinícius Barrivieira
- Date of birth: 19 July 1985 (age 41)
- Place of birth: Marechal Cândido Rondon, Brazil
- Height: 1.91 m (6 ft 3 in)
- Position: Goalkeeper

Team information
- Current team: Mixto

Youth career
- 1999–2005: Atlético Paranaense

Senior career*
Years	Team	Apps	(Gls)
2005–2012	Atlético Paranaense	20	(0)
2010	→ Vitória (loan)	5	(0)
2010–2011	→ Litex Lovech (loan)	35	(0)
2013–2014	Vila Nova	0	(0)
2014–2016	Litex Lovech	51	(0)
2017	América RN	0	(0)
2018	Cascavel	0	(0)
2019–	Mixto	0	(0)
- * Club domestic league appearances and goals as of 22:51, 16 April 2016 (UTC)

Vinícius Barrivieira (born July 19, 1985, in Marechal Cândido Rondon-SP), or simply Vinícius, is a Brazilian footballer who plays as a goalkeeper for Mixto.

== Career ==
Vinícius is a product of Atlético Paranaense's youth system. He made his first-team debut during the 2005 season on February 23, 2005, in a 3–2 away win over Francisco Beltrão, in a match of Campeonato Paranaense. On 21 October 2007, Vinícius made his Série A debut, keeping a clean sheet against América-RN at Arena da Baixada. In the following two seasons he was second-choice goalkeeper behind Rodrigo Galatto.

On 8 February 2010 Vinícius was loaned to Esporte Clube Vitória for four months, where he earned 5 league appearances.

On 10 August 2010, it was announced that Barrivieira would join the Bulgarian side Litex Lovech on a loan deal. He won the A PFG title with the team from Lovech in 2011.

== Club statistics ==
As of 16 April 2016

Club	Season	Division	League		State League		Cup		Continental		Total	
Club	Season	Division	Apps	Goals	Apps	Goals	Apps	Goals	Apps	Goals	Apps	Goals
Atlético Paranaense	2005	Série A	0	0	?	?	?	?	–		0	0
Atlético Paranaense	2006	Série A	0	0	?	?	?	?	0	0	0	0
Atlético Paranaense	2007	Série A	2	0	?	?	?	?	–		2	0
Atlético Paranaense	2008	Série A	8	0	?	?	?	?	3	0	11	0
Atlético Paranaense	2009	Série A	10	0	0	0	0	0	0	0	10	0
Atlético Paranaense	2012	Série B	0	0	8	0	3	0	–		11	0
Atlético Paranaense	Total		20	0	8	0	3	0	3	0	34	0
Vitória (loan)	2010	Série A	5	0	1	0	0	0	–		6	0
Vitória (loan)	Total		5	0	1	0	0	0	–		6	0
Litex Lovech (loan)	2010–11	A Group	26	0	–		3	0	1	0	30	0
Litex Lovech (loan)	2011–12	A Group	9	0	–		0	0	6	0	15	0
Litex Lovech (loan)	Total		35	0	–		3	0	7	0	45	0
Vila Nova	2013	Série C	0	0	16	0	0	0	–		16	0
Vila Nova	Total		0	0	16	0	0	0	–		16	0
Litex Lovech	2014–15	A Group	31	0	–		3	0	2	0	36	0
Litex Lovech	2015–16	A Group	20	0	–		2	0	2	0	24	0
Litex Lovech	Total		51	0	–		5	0	4	0	60	0
Career Total			111	0	25	0	11	0	14	0	161	0

== Honours ==
=== Club ===
Atlético Paranaense

- Dallas Cup: 2004
- Paraná State League: 2005

Litex Lovech

- A Group: 2010–11
