= Wilfried Niflore =

French footballer (born 1981)

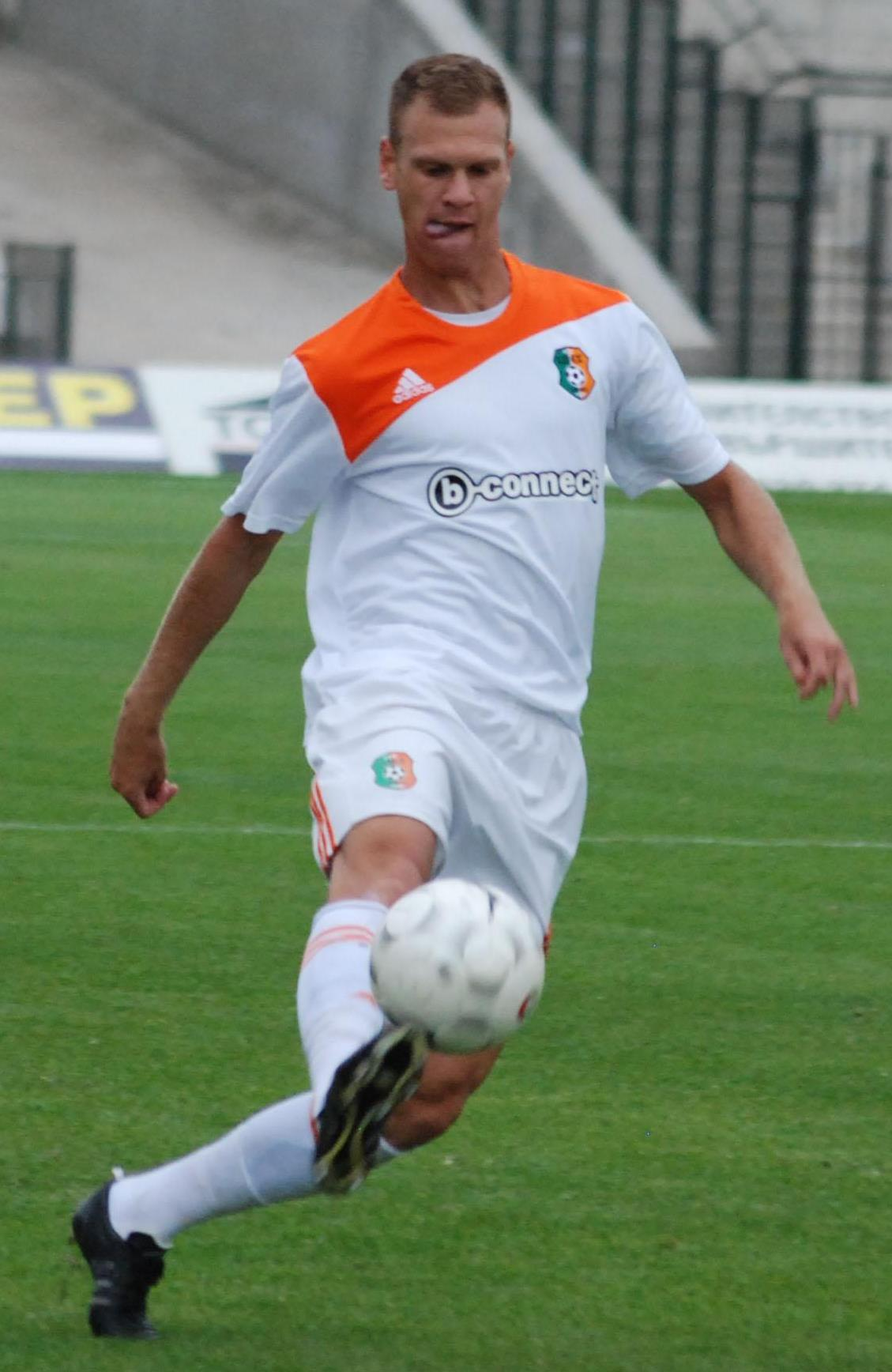
- Niflore with Litex Lovech in 2009

Personal information
- Date of birth: 29 April 1981 (age 45)
- Place of birth: Toulouse, France
- Height: 1.86 m (6 ft 1 in)
- Position: Forward

Senior career*
Years	Team	Apps	(Gls)
2001–2002	Toulouse	23	(3)
2002–2004	Cannes	52	(18)
2004–2005	Tours	30	(9)
2005–2007	Gueugnon	72	(23)
2008–2011	Litex Lovech	75	(39)
2011–2013	Nîmes	18	(1)
2013	→ Paris FC (loan)	12	(2)
2013–2014	Muret	19	(4)
Total		301	(99)

Managerial career
- 2014–2016: Muret (youth)
- 2016: Muret (assistant)
- 2016–2019: Blagnac
- 2019: Cholet (assistant)
- 2019: Cholet (caretaker)
- 2019–2021: Muret
- * Club domestic league appearances and goals

Wilfried Niflore (born 29 April 1981) is a French professional football manager and former player.

== Playing career ==
=== In France ===
Born in Toulouse, Niflore began his career at local club Toulouse FC, making his professional debuts in 2001–02. He earned 23 appearances for the club, scored three goals, before moved to AS Cannes in the summer of 2002. In his country Niflore also played for Tours FC and FC Gueugnon, before in January 2008 relocated to Bulgaria.

=== Litex Lovech ===
On 10 January 2008, Niflore signed a two-and-a-half-year contract with Litex Lovech. He made his competitive debut for Litex on 1 March 2008 against CSKA Sofia. A few days later, on 8 March Niflore scored his first goal for the club against Vihren Sandanski.

In the 2008–09 season, Niflore's form blossomed as he became first-choice striker due to the departure of Emil Angelov to Denizlispor. In this season, Niflore earned 31 appearances for the club and scored 10 goals.

Wilfried started excellently the 2009–10 season, scoring his first goals of the season in the first round of First Professional Football League on 8 August 2009 in a 5–0 victory over Lokomotiv Mezdra. He scored twice. This season proved to be one of remarkable personal achievements for Niflore. He completed the season as the Professional League's top goal-scorer with 19 goals.

=== Return to France ===
After 94 matches for Litex, in which he scored some 43 goals, Niflore signed for French Championnat National side Nîmes Olympique. He would have spells at Paris FC and Muret before retiring in 2014.

== Personal life ==
Niflore's son Mathys Niflore is also a professional footballer.

== Honours ==
Litex Lovech

- First Professional Football League: 2009–10
- Bulgarian Cup: 2008, 2009
- Bulgarian Supercup: 2010

Individual

- First Professional Football League top scorer: 2009–10
