= Sandrinho (footballer, born 1980) =

Brazilian footballer

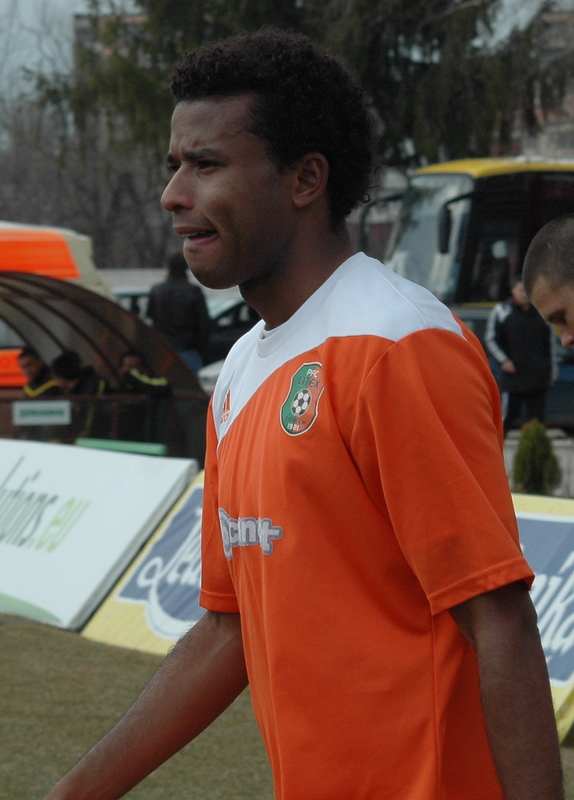

Personal information
- Full name: Alessandro Correa
- Date of birth: 5 July 1980 (age 46)
- Place of birth: Aimorés, Brazil
- Height: 1.84 m (6 ft 0 in)
- Position: Attacking midfielder

Senior career*
Years	Team	Apps	(Gls)
1998–2000	Nacional		
2000–2001	Monterrey	48	(6)
2002–2003	Cobras	52	(3)
2004	Juventude	16	(6)
2005–2012	Litex Lovech	173	(24)
- * Club domestic league appearances and goals

Alessandro Correa (born 5 July 1980), better known as Sandrinho, is a Brazilian former professional footballer who played as an attacking midfielder.

== Career ==
Sandrinho made his debut at Nacional Futebol Clube, where he played in the seasons 1998–2000. In 2000, he moved to Mexican side Club de Fútbol Monterrey. There he played from 2000 to 2002. In June 2003 Sandrinho returned to Brazil, signing a contract with Esporte Clube Juventude. Due to his performances there, manager Itzhak Shum of Litex Lovech signed him in January 2005. Sandrinho quickly became part of the main team. With Litex he won two times the Bulgarian Cup - in 2008 and in 2009 in addition to two national titles - in 2010 and 2011. Sandrinho left the club from Lovech with the expiration of his contract in June 2012.

== Career statistics ==
As of 24 May 2012

Club	Season	League		Cup		Europe		Total	
Club	Season	Apps	Goals	Apps	Goals	Apps	Goals	Apps	Goals
Litex Lovech	2004–05	15	4	0	0	0	0	15	4
Litex Lovech	2005–06	27	7	2	0	10	2	39	9
Litex Lovech	2006–07	28	1	5	3	6	2	39	6
Litex Lovech	2007–08	27	3	4	0	6	0	37	3
Litex Lovech	2008–09	29	6	5	0	4	1	38	7
Litex Lovech	2009–10	25	1	2	1	2	1	29	3
Litex Lovech	2010–11	10	1	1	0	6	1	17	2
Litex Lovech	2011–12	12	1	0	0	0	0	1	0
Total		173	24	19	4	34	7	226	35

== Honours ==
Litex Lovech

- Bulgarian A PFG: 2009–10, 2010–11
- Bulgarian Cup: 2008, 2009
- Bulgarian Supercup: 2010
