= Stadion Ogosta =

Sports Stadium in Bulgaria

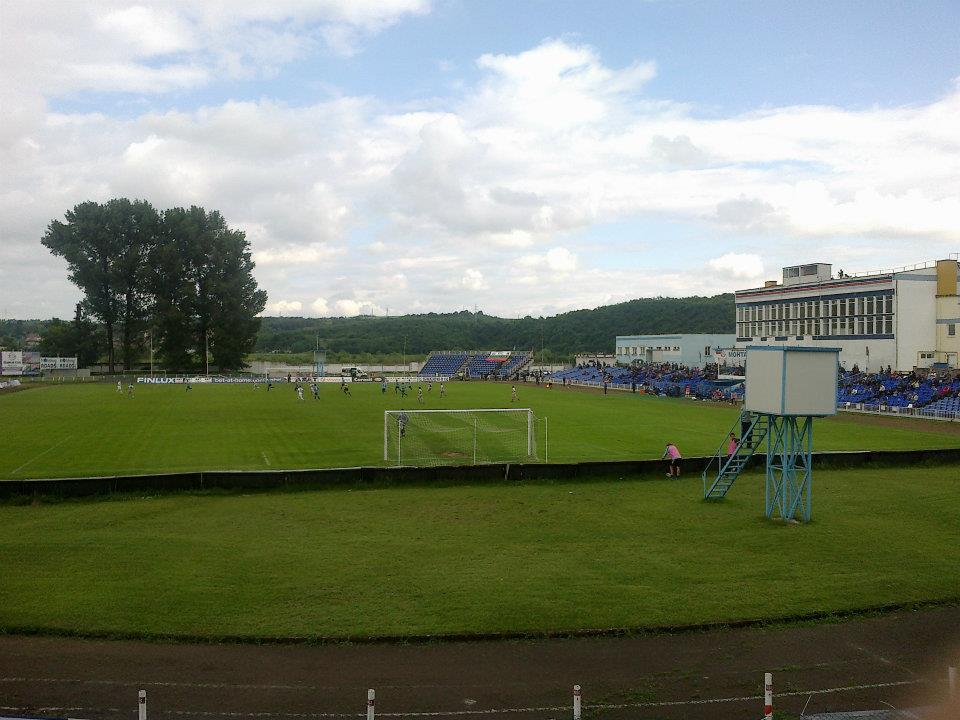
- Interactive map of Stadion Ogosta
- Full name: Ogosta Stadium
- Location: Montana, Bulgaria
- Coordinates: 43°23′55″N 23°13′31″E
- Owner: Montana Municipality
- Operator: FC Montana
- Capacity: 7,000
- Surface: Grass
- Field size: 105 X 60

Construction
- Groundbreaking: 1962
- Built: 1962 - 1965
- Opened: 1965
- Renovated: 2006, 2014, 2017

Tenant
- FC Montana (1965-present)

Stadion Ogosta (Bulgarian: Стадион „Огоста“, English: 'Ogosta Stadium') is a multi-purpose stadium in Montana, Bulgaria. It is currently used for football matches and is the home ground of local football club PFC Montana. The stadium has a seating capacity of 7,000 spectators.

- The record attendance at the stadium is 11,500 during a game between PFC Montana and CSKA Sofia.
- The stadium's name is derived from the river Ogosta, which passes through the club's namesake town.
