= 2010–11 PFC CSKA Sofia season =

CSKA Sofia
2010–11 season
- Chairman: Dimitar Borisov
- Manager: Pavel Dochev (until August 16); Gjore Jovanovski (until October 21); Milen Radukanov (from October 21)
- A Group: Third place
- Bulgarian Cup: Winners
- UEFA Europa League: Group Stage
- Top goalscorer: League: Delev (13); All: Delev (22)
- Highest home attendance: 12,300 vs Levski Sofia (1 August 2010)
- Lowest home attendance: 450 vs Kaliakra (17 October 2010)
Home colours	Away colours

The 2010–11 season was PFC CSKA Sofia's 63rd consecutive season in A Group. This article shows player statistics and all matches (official and friendly) that the club will play during the 2010–11 season.

== Players ==
=== Squad statistics ===
Appearances for competitive matches only

No.	Pos	Nat	Player	Total		A Group		Bulgarian Cup		Europa League	
No.	Pos	Nat	Player	Apps	Goals	Apps	Goals	Apps	Goals	Apps	Goals
1	GK	(Bulgaria) BUL	Zdravko Chavdarov	4	0	2	0	2	0	0	0
3	MF	(Bulgaria) BUL	Tomislav Kostadinov	9	1	0+5	0	0	0	0+4	1
4	DF	(Bulgaria) BUL	Kostadin Stoyanov	27	1	17	1	3+1	0	6	0
5	MF	(Bulgaria) BUL	Todor Yanchev	43	2	27+1	0	5	1	10	1
6	DF	(Italy) ITA	Giuseppe Aquaro	31	5	19	3	3	0	9	2
7	MF	(Bulgaria) BUL	Spas Delev	39	22	24+2	13	5	7	5+3	2
8	DF	(Bulgaria) BUL	Rumen Trifonov	42	3	27+2	2	5	0	8	1
9	FW	(Brazil) BRA	Michel Platini	26	10	15+3	10	3+1	0	4	0
11	DF	(Bulgaria) BUL	Ivan Bandalovski	19	0	13+2	0	4	0	0	0
12	GK	(Bulgaria) BUL	Ivan Karadzhov	24	0	17	0	3	0	4	0
14	FW	(Bulgaria) BUL	Stanislav Kostov	3	1	2+1	1	0	0	0	0
17	MF	(Bulgaria) BUL	Chetin Sadula	6	0	3+2	0	0+1	0	0	0
18	MF	(Bulgaria) BUL	Boris Galchev	34	1	19+3	1	4	0	4+4	0
19	DF	(Bulgaria) BUL	Apostol Popov	26	2	16+4	2	4+1	0	1	0
21	MF	(Bulgaria) BUL	Kosta Yanev	26	0	6+11	0	2+1	0	3+3	0
22	MF	(Bulgaria) BUL	Petar Stoyanov	4	0	2+1	0	0+1	0	0	0
23	MF	(Bulgaria) BUL	Emil Gargorov	13	2	6+6	2	0+1	0	0	0
24	MF	(Bulgaria) BUL	Aleksandar Tonev	35	2	17+6	2	1+3	0	7+1	0
26	FW	(Republic of Ireland) IRL	Cillian Sheridan	26	7	9+7	4	1+2	2	4+3	1
27	FW	(Bulgaria) BUL	Stanko Yovchev	6	0	0+5	0	0+1	0	0	0
28	MF	(Brazil) BRA	Marquinhos	43	13	24+4	9	5	1	9+1	3
29	FW	(Netherlands) NED	Gregory Nelson	31	4	17+6	3	3	0	4+1	1
30	DF	(Italy) ITA	Fabrizio Grillo	7	0	3	0	0	0	3+1	0
88	GK	(Bulgaria) BUL	Blagoy Makendzhiev	2	0	2	0	0	0	0	0
Players sold or loaned out after the start of the season:
2	DF	(Bulgaria) BUL	Pavel Vidanov	23	1	12	0	1+1	0	9	1
9	FW	(Bulgaria) BUL	Dormushali Saidhodzha	7	0	0+5	0	0	0	1+1	0
10	FW	(Portugal) POR	Rui Miguel	3	0	1	0	0	0	1+1	0
10	MF	(Argentina) ARG	Lucas Trecarichi	7	0	1+4	0	0	0	0+2	0
11	DF	(Bulgaria) BUL	Kristiyan Velinov	0	0	0	0	0	0	0	0
13	GK	(Bulgaria) BUL	Bozhidar Stoychev	0	0	0	0	0	0	0	0
14	FW	(Bulgaria) BUL	Dimitar Iliev	10	0	2+3	0	0+1	0	3+1	0
15	MF	(France) FRA	Elliot Grandin	2	0	1	0	0	0	1	0
16	FW	(Italy) ITA	Christian Tiboni	6	1	1+3	0	0	0	1+1	1
16	FW	(Serbia) SRB	Nikola Radulović	0	0	0	0	0	0	0	0
17	MF	(Bulgaria) BUL	Atanas Zehirov	0	0	0	0	0	0	0	0
20	MF	(Bulgaria) BUL	Nikolay Manchev	0	0	0	0	0	0	0	0
22	DF	(Italy) ITA	Marco Esposito	3	0	2+1	0	0	0	0	0
23	MF	(Ghana) GHA	William Tiero	6	0	3+1	0	0	0	2	0
25	DF	(Bulgaria) BUL	Yordan Minev	11	0	6	0	1	0	4	0
27	DF	(Bulgaria) BUL	Martin Dechev	8	0	5	0	0	0	1+2	0
92	GK	(Algeria) ALG	Raïs M'Bolhi	15	0	9	0	0	0	6	0

As of 29 May 2011

== Players in/out ==
=== Summer transfers ===
In: Note: Flags indicate national team as defined under FIFA eligibility rules; some limited exceptions apply. Players may hold more than one non-FIFA nationality.

No.	Pos.	Nation	Player
3	MF	BUL	Tomislav Kostadinov (Loan return from Bdin Vidin)
6	DF	ITA	Giuseppe Aquaro (From Aarau)
7	MF	BUL	Spas Delev (From Pirin, previously on loan)
10	MF	ARG	Lucas Trecarichi (Free from Sevilla II, previously on loan at Ponferradina)
11	DF	BUL	Ivan Bandalovski (Free from Lokomotiv Sofia)
14	FW	BUL	Dimitar Iliev (Loan return from Minyor Pernik)
15	DF	BUL	Martin Vasilev (Free from CSKA Sofia II)
16	FW	ITA	Christian Tiboni (On Loan from Atalanta)
17	MF	BUL	Atanas Zehirov (Loan return from OFC Sliven 2000)
22	DF	ITA	Marco Esposito (From Mantova)
23	MF	GHA	William Tiero (Free from Académica de Coimbra)
24	MF	BUL	Aleksandar Tonev (Loan return from OFC Sliven 2000)
26	FW	IRL	Cillian Sheridan (From Celtic, previously on loan at St Johnstone)
27	DF	BUL	Martin Dechev (Loan return from Lokomotiv Mezdra)
29	FW	NED	Gregory Nelson (Free from AZ, previously on loan at RBC Roosendaal)
30	DF	ITA	Fabrizio Grillo (From Arezzo, previously on loan at Crotone)
36	FW	SRB	Nikola Radulović (From Radnički Pirot)
92	GK	ALG	Raïs M'Bolhi (Loan from Slavia Sofia)

Out: Note: Flags indicate national team as defined under FIFA eligibility rules; some limited exceptions apply. Players may hold more than one non-FIFA nationality.

No.	Pos.	Nation	Player
3	MF	POR	David Silva (Released, previously on loan from Castellón)
7	FW	BUL	Vladimir Manchev (Free to Akademik Sofia)
10	FW	POR	Rui Miguel (Released)
11	DF	BUL	Kristiyan Velinov (On loan at Akademik Sofia)
13	DF	BUL	Aleksandar Branekov (Free to Vidima-Rakovski)
14	MF	BUL	Svetoslav Petrov (Released)
15	FW	FRA	Elliot Grandin (To Blackpool)
17	MF	BUL	Atanas Zehirov (Terminated contract)
20	MF	BUL	Nikolay Manchev (Free to Botev Plovdiv)
29	FW	BUL	Blagoy Paskov (Free to Pirin, previously on loan from Bdin Vidin)
32	MF	LAT	Viktors Morozs (Released)
—	DF	BUL	Dimitar Petkov (Free to Cherno more Varna, previously on loan from Lokomotiv Mezdra)
—	FW	BUL	Ivaylo Dimitrov (Released, previously on loan from Sportist Svoge)

=== Winter transfers ===
In: Note: Flags indicate national team as defined under FIFA eligibility rules; some limited exceptions apply. Players may hold more than one non-FIFA nationality.

No.	Pos.	Nation	Player
14	FW	BUL	Stanislav Kostov (From Pirin Blagoevgrad)
16	MF	BUL	Vladimir Baharov (From CSKA Sofia II)
17	FW	BUL	Stanko Yovchev (From Pontioi Katerini)
22	MF	BUL	Petar Stoyanov (From Sliven)
23	MF	BUL	Emil Gargorov (From Universitatea Craiova)
27	MF	BUL	Chetin Sadula (From Kaliakra Kavarna)
34	FW	BUL	Borislav Nikolov (From CSKA Sofia II)
35	DF	BUL	Angel Granchov (From CSKA Sofia II)
38	MF	BUL	Georgi Amzin (From CSKA Sofia II)
88	GK	BUL	Blagoy Makendzhiev (From Pirin Blagoevgrad)
—	FW	CHI	Nicolás Medina (From Osasuna)
—	MF	POR	Sérgio Organista (From OFI)

Out: Note: Flags indicate national team as defined under FIFA eligibility rules; some limited exceptions apply. Players may hold more than one non-FIFA nationality.

No.	Pos.	Nation	Player
2	DF	BUL	Pavel Vidanov (On loan at Rapid București)
9	FW	BUL	Dormushali Saidhodzha (Free to Lokomotiv Sofia)
13	GK	BUL	Bozhidar Stoychev (On loan at Akademik Sofia)
14	FW	BUL	Dimitar Iliev (On loan at Pirin Blagoevgrad)
16	FW	ITA	Christian Tiboni (Free to Hellas Verona, previously on loan from Atalanta)
16	FW	SRB	Nikola Radulović (On loan at Akademik Sofia)
22	DF	ITA	Marco Esposito (To Portogruaro)
23	MF	GHA	William Tiero (Released to Olhanense)
25	DF	BUL	Yordan Minev (Free to Botev Plovdiv)
27	DF	BUL	Martin Dechev (On loan at Ludogorets Razgrad)
92	GK	ALG	Raïs M'Bolhi (To Krylia Sovetov Samara, previously on loan from Slavia Sofia)
—	FW	CHI	Nicolás Medina (On loan at Akademik Sofia)
—	MF	POR	Sérgio Organista (On loan at Akademik Sofia)

== Player seasonal records ==
Competitive matches only. Updated to games played 29 May 2011.

=== Goalscorers ===
Player	League	Cup	Europa League	Total
(Bulgaria) Spas Delev	13	7	2	22
(Brazil) Marquinhos	9	1	3	13
(Brazil) Michel Platini	10	0	0	10
(Republic of Ireland) Cillian Sheridan	4	2	1	7
(Italy) Giuseppe Aquaro	3	0	2	5
(Netherlands) Gregory Nelson	3	0	1	4
(Bulgaria) Rumen Trifonov	2	0	1	3
(Bulgaria) Aleksandar Tonev	2	0	0	2
(Bulgaria) Apostol Popov	2	0	0	2
(Bulgaria) Emil Gargorov	2	0	0	2
(Bulgaria) Todor Yanchev	0	1	1	2
(Bulgaria) Stanislav Kostov	1	0	0	1
(Bulgaria) Kostadin Stoyanov	1	0	0	1
(Bulgaria) Boris Galchev	1	0	0	1
(Bulgaria) Pavel Vidanov	0	0	1	1
(Bulgaria) Tomislav Kostadinov	0	0	1	1
(Italy) Christian Tiboni	0	0	1	1
Total	53	11	14	78

=== Start formations ===
Qnt	Formation	Match(es)
20	4-2-3-1	EL1, 1, EL2, 2, 3, 6, EL5, 9, 13, C1, C2, EL10, 17, C3, 21, C4, 24, 25, 26, 27, CF
11	4-1-4-1	10, EL7, 11, 12, 16, 18, 20, 23, 28, 29, 30
5	4-4-2	EL3, 4, 5, 8, EL6
4	4-3-3	EL4, EL8, 14, 19
1	4-1-3-2	7
1	3-4-2-1	15
1	4-4-1-1	EL9

Last updated: 29 May 2011
Source: Match reports in Competitive matches
Only competitive matches.

=== Overall ===
	Total	Home	Away
Games played	30	15	15
Games won	18	10	8
Games drawn	7	3	4
Games lost	4	2	3
Biggest win	4–0 vs Chernomorets	3–1 vs Lokomotiv Sofia; 3–1 vs Akademik Sofia	4–0 vs Chernomorets
Biggest loss	1–4 vs Lokomotiv Plovdiv	1–2 vs Chernomorets	1–4 vs Lokomotiv Plovdiv
Clean sheets	13	8	5
Goals scored	53	23	30
Goals conceded	26	10	16
Goal difference	+27	+11	+14
Top scorer	Delev – 13	Delev – 7	Delev – 6
Winning rate	60%	67%	53%

Last updated: 29 May 2011
Source: Competitive matches

Team	Results		Points
Team	Home	Away	Points
Akademik	3–1	1–1	4
Beroe	3–2	2–0	6
Cherno more	1–0	0–1	3
Chernomorets	1–2	4–0	3
Kaliakra	0–0	3–0	4
Levski	0–1	3–1	3
Litex	1–1	0–0	2
Lokomotiv Plovdiv	1–0	1–4	3
Lokomotiv Sofia	3–1	2–2	4
Minyor	2–0	4–2	6
Montana	2–0	4–1	6
Pirin	2–2	1–0	4
Slavia	1–0	0–1	3
Sliven	2–0	3–1	6
Vidima	1–0	2–2	4

Source: Soccerway

== Pre-season and friendlies ==
Win Draw Loss Fixtures

=== Pre-season ===
27 June 2010 Friendly	CSKA (Bulgaria)	0–1	(Azerbaijan) Inter Baku	Samokov
17:00 EEST	Stoyanov (yellow card)	Report	Zlatinov 50' (pen.); Jill (yellow card); Zhelev (yellow card) 77' (yellow-red card) 80'	Stadium: Iskar; Attendance: 300; Referee: Anton Genov

3 July 2010 Friendly	CSKA (Bulgaria)	1–0	(Germany) Arminia Bielefeld	Bad Lippspringe, Germany
12:00 EEST	Marquinhos 38'; Tiero (yellow card) 35'	Report	Abelski (yellow card) 48'	Stadium: Stadion am Kurwald; Attendance: 250

7 July 2010 Friendly	SC Verl (Germany)	0–5	(Bulgaria) CSKA	Verl, Germany
18:30 EEST		Report	Iliev 61'; Delev 64', 87', 88'; Böhmer-Schulte 79' (o.g.); Yanev (yellow card) 66'	Stadium: Stadion an der Poststraße; Attendance: 200

8 July 2010 Friendly	CSKA (Bulgaria)	4–3	(Germany) Hannover 96 II	Bad Lippspringe, Germany
19:00 EEST	Manchev 13'; Iliev 23'; Marquinhos 64' (pen.); Rui Miguel 84'; Yanchev (yellow card) 57'	Report	Beil 30'; Hofmann 45'; Bopp 86' (yellow card)	Stadium: Stadion am Kurwald; Attendance: 250

12 July 2010 Friendly	CSKA (Bulgaria)	3–1	(Greece) PAOK	Homberg, Germany
19:30 EEST	Vidanov 17'; Balafas 79' (o.g.); Manchev 89' (pen.); Minev (yellow card) 59'	Report	Balafas 80'; Etto (yellow card) 30'	Stadium: Stelbergstadion; Attendance: 300

14 July 2010 Friendly	Rot-Weiß Oberhausen (Germany)	2–1	(Bulgaria) CSKA	Oberhausen, Germany
20:00 EEST	Çelik 13'; Klinger 45'	Report	Tonev 55'; Manchev (yellow card)	Stadium: Niederrheinstadion; Attendance: 124

18 July 2010 Friendly	CSKA	5–1	Kom-Minyor Berkovitsa	Tsarsko selo, Sofia
18:00 EEST	Vidanov 2'; Tonev 53'; Rui Miguel 59'; Kostadinov 64', 82'; Velinov (yellow card) 21'; Manchev (yellow card) 43'	Report	Kolev (yellow card) 42' (goal) 85'	Stadium: Tsarsko selo Attendance: 200

=== On-season (autumn) ===
22 July 2010 Friendly	CSKA (Bulgaria)	2–5	(Cyprus) Olympiakos Nicosia	Sofia
19:00 EEST	Kostadinov 78'; Delev (yellow card) 81' (goal) 83'; Aquaro (yellow card) 16'; Minev (yellow card) 38'	Report	Kenmogne 21'; Sotirou 47'; Wilson (yellow card) 15' (goal) 56'; Caiado 65'; Onyemah 86'	Stadium: Vasil Levski; Attendance: 6,000; Referee: Angel Angelov

10 August 2010 Friendly	CSKA	1–2	Botev Vratsa	Sofia
18:30 EEST	Radulović 9'; Rui Miguel (yellow card) 33'	Report	Danchev 58'; Chalakov 68'	Stadium: Balgaraska Armiya; Attendance: 200

7 September 2010 Friendly	CSKA	3–1	Botev Krivodol	Sofia
17:00 EEST	Iliev 45'; Delev 57'; Marquinhos 87'	Report	Manolov 1'; Kunchev (yellow card) 39'	Stadium: Balgaraska Armiya; Attendance: 800; Referee: Unknown

21 September 2010 Friendly	CSKA	7–2	Sportist Svoge	Tsarsko selo, Sofia
17:00 EEST	Trecarichi 16'; Delev 17'; D. Iliev 39', 47'; Radulović 63'; Saidhodzha 75' (pen.); G. Vasilev 87'	Report	Semerdzhiev 6'; Malikatov 69' (o.g.); B. Iliev (yellow card) 20'; Korudzhiev (yellow card) 33'	Stadium: Tsarsko selo Referee: Georgi Dimitrov

12 October 2010 Friendly	CSKA	4–2	Dorostol Silistra	Sofia
16:00 EEST	Tiboni 6', 36'; Michel Platini 28'; Trecarichi 29'	Report	B. Nikolov 16'; Beadirov 60'	Stadium: Balgaraska Armiya; Attendance: 300; Referee: Tasko Taskov

24 November 2010 Friendly	CSKA	2–0	Slivnishki Geroy Slivnitsa	Sofia
14:00 EET	Delev 5'; Saidhodzha 65' (pen.)	Report	Velchev (yellow card) 68'	Stadium: Balgaraska Armiya; Referee: Valeri Petrovski

=== Mid-season ===
24 January 2011 Friendly	CSKA	3–0	Vihren	Xanthi, Greece
15:00 EET	K. Stoyanov 23'; Galchev 40'; Delev 47'	Report		Stadium: Skoda Xanthi Arena; Attendance: 50; Referee: Ivan Babanov

28 January 2011 Friendly	CSKA	6–0	Sportist Svoge	Pravets
15:00 EET	Sadula 7'; Delev 12', 77', 83', 85'; Yovchev 81'	Report		Stadium: Gradski; Attendance: 50

31 January 2011 Friendly	CSKA	0–0	Chavdar Etropole	Pravets
14:00 EET	Marquinhos (yellow card) 10'; Minev (yellow card) 20'	Report	Tonchev (yellow card) 10'	Stadium: Gradski; Attendance: 400; Referee: Spas Dzhevizov

4 February 2011 Friendly	CSKA	2–0	Ludogorets Razgrad	Side, Turkey
16:00 EET	Marquinhos 2' (pen.); Trecarichi 90'; Vidanov (yellow card) 36'	Report	Dimov (yellow card) 49'	Stadium: Hane Hotel; Referee: Georgi Yordanov

6 February 2011 Friendly	CSKA (Bulgaria)	1–0	(Ukraine) Chornomorets Odesa	Side, Turkey
17:00 EET	Aquaro 72'; Bandalovski (yellow card) 23'; Marquinhos (yellow card) 55'	Report	Zubeyko (yellow card)	Stadium: Starlight Hotel; Referee: Valkov

8 February 2011 Friendly	CSKA (Bulgaria)	1–0	(Ukraine) Metalurh Donetsk	Belek, Turkey
15:00 EET	Marquinhos 31'	Report		Stadium: IC Santai Hotel; Attendance: 20; Referee: Dimitar Petkov

9 February 2011 Friendly	CSKA (Bulgaria)	3–2	(Russia) Amkar Perm	Side, Turkey
17:00 EET	Delev 4'; Nelson 32'; Radulović 48'	Report	Tyukalov 17'; Majkić 26'; Maki (yellow card); Kalashnikov (yellow card) 38' (yellow-red card) 42'	Stadium: Emirhan Sport Center; Referee: Georgi Kabakov

12 February 2011 Friendly	CSKA (Bulgaria)	0–0	(Poland) Górnik Zabrze	Side, Turkey
17:00 EET	Galchev (yellow card) 84' (yellow-red card) 87'	Report		Stadium: Blue Waters Hotel

15 February 2011 Friendly	CSKA (Bulgaria)	2–1	(Romania) Vaslui	Side, Turkey
17:00 EET	Nelson 61'; Michel Platini 77' (pen.); Aquaro (yellow card) 19'; Popov (yellow card) 32'; Galchev (yellow card) 35' (yellow-red card) 50'; Bandalovski (yellow card) 63'; Kostov (yellow card) 90+3'	Report	Temwanjera 90'; Adaílton (yellow card) 26'; Papp (yellow card) 42'; Bello (yellow card) 45' (yellow-red card) 72'; Bălace (yellow card) 70'; Milanov (yellow card) 71'; Costin (yellow card) 72'; Kuciak (yellow card) 73' (yellow-red card) 74'; Campano (yellow card) 80'	Stadium: Papillon Sport Center; Attendance: 10

19 February 2011 Friendly	CSKA	2–1	Chavdar Byala Slatina	Elin Pelin
14:00 EET	Tonev 42'; Sheridan 57'	Report	Vasilev 67'; Atanasov (yellow card) 38'	Stadium: Levski Stadium; Attendance: 500; Referee: Adrian Petrov

=== On-season (spring) ===
26 March 2011 Friendly	CSKA	1–0	Chavdar Byala Slatina	Pravets
14:00 EET	Yanchev 2'	Report		Stadium: Gradski; Attendance: 150; Referee: Kalin Lyudmilov

== Competitions ==
=== A Group ===
==== Table ====
Pos	Team	Pld	W	D	L	GF	GA	GD	Pts	Qualification or relegation
1	Litex Lovech (C)	30	23	6	1	56	13	+43	75	Qualification for Champions League second qualifying round
2	Levski Sofia	30	23	3	4	67	24	+43	72	Qualification for Europa League third qualifying round
3	CSKA Sofia	30	18	7	5	53	26	+27	61	Qualification for Europa League play-off round (Note: CSKA Sofia have won the 2010–11 Bulgarian Cup competition and therefore qualified for the play-off round of the 2011–12 UEFA Europa League.)
4	Lokomotiv Sofia	30	16	4	10	47	33	+14	52 (Note: Lokomotiv Sofia ahead of Lokomotiv Plovdiv on head-to-head record; Lokomotiv Sofia–Lokomotiv Plovdiv 3–0, Lokomotiv Plovdiv–Lokomotiv Sofia 0–0.)	Qualification for Europa League second qualifying round
5	Lokomotiv Plovdiv	30	14	10	6	54	28	+26	52	

Source: A PFG (in Bulgarian)
Rules for classification: 1st points; 2nd head-to-head points; 3rd head-to-head goal difference; 4th head-to-head goals scored; 5th head-to-head away goals scored; 6th goal difference; 7th goals scored
(C) Champions

==== Results summary ====
Overall								Home						Away					
Pld	W	D	L	GF	GA	GD	Pts	W	D	L	GF	GA	GD	W	D	L	GF	GA	GD
30	18	7	5	53	26	+27	61	10	3	2	23	10	+13	8	4	3	30	16	+14

Last updated: 29 May 2011.
Source: Soccerway

==== Results by round ====
Round	1	2	3	4	5	6	7	8	9	10	11	12	13	14	15	16	17	18	19	20	21	22	23	24	25	26	27	28	29	30
Ground	H	H	A	H	A	H	A	H	A	H	A	H	A	H	A	A	A	H	A	H	A	H	A	H	A	H	A	H	A	H
Result	L	L	D	W	W	D	L	W	D	D	W	W	W	W	D	W	W	W	L	W	D	W	W	W	W	W	W	D	L	W
Position	14	16	13	11	9	9	9	9	8	9	8	7	6	4	5	5	3	3	3	3	3	3	3	3	3	3	3	3	3	3

Source: CSKA Sofia league results
A = Away; H = Home; W = Win; D = Draw; L = Loss

==== Fixtures and results ====
1 August 2010 1	CSKA	0–1	Levski	Sofia
21:00 EEST	Grandin (yellow card) 62'; Marquinhos (yellow card) 19' (yellow-red card) 90+3'	(Report)	Dembélé 39'; Minev (yellow card) 27'; Petkov (yellow card) 59'; Gadzhev (yellow card) 61' (yellow-red card) 81'; Topuzakov (yellow card) 84'; Yovov (yellow card) 89'	Stadium: Vasil Levski; Attendance: 12,300; Referee: Stanislav Todorov (Shumen)

8 August 2010 2	CSKA	1–2	Chernomorets	Sofia
21:00 EEST	Trifonov 1'; Aquaro (yellow card) 43' (yellow-red card) 67'; Galchev (yellow card) 68' (yellow-red card) 80'	Report	Hajri 7'; Pedrinha 42'; André (yellow card) 20'; Fernández (yellow card) 53'; Starokin (yellow card) 57'; Andonov (yellow card) 68'; Pedrinha (yellow card) 79'; Borel (yellow card) 86'	Stadium: Vasil Levski; Attendance: 750; Referee: Georgi Yordanov (Gabrovo)

14 August 2010 3	Vidima-Rakovski	2–2	CSKA	Sevlievo
18:00 EEST	Zakov 22' (pen.); Ashimov 77'; Tsvetkov (yellow card) 32' (yellow-red card) 63'; Stoychev (yellow card) 60'; Ashimov (yellow card) 65' (yellow-red card) 90+5'; Panov (yellow card) 71'; Iliev (yellow card) 88'	Report	Delev 4'; Marquinhos 40'; Dechev (yellow card) 21'; Vidanov (yellow card) 65'	Stadium: Rakovski; Attendance: 1,800; Referee: Ivaylo Stoyanov (Petrich)

22 August 2010 4	CSKA	1–0	Cherno More	Sofia
21:00 EEST	Marquinhos 76'; Yanchev (yellow card) 61'; Nelson (yellow card) 88'	Report	Georgiev (yellow card) 52'; Petkov (yellow card) 67'; Ademar (yellow card) 85'; Atanasov (yellow card) 90'	Stadium: Vasil Levski; Attendance: 900; Referee: Ahmed Ahmed (Burgas)

29 August 2010 5	Sliven	1–3	CSKA	Sliven
18:00 EEST	Hristov 14'; Kovachev (yellow card) 1'	Report	Aquaro 55'; Tonev 58'; Sheridan 60'; Galchev (yellow card) 90'	Stadium: Hadzhi Dimitar; Attendance: 5,500; Referee: Angel Angelov (Sofia)

11 September 2010 6	CSKA	1–1	Litex	Sofia
21:00 EEST	Marquinhos 39'; Aquaro (yellow card) 28'; Galchev (yellow card) 54'; Sheridan (yellow card) 68'; Yanchev (yellow card) 78'	Report	Todorov 11'; Vinícius (yellow card) 23'; Berberović (yellow card) 58'; Zanev (yellow card) 75'; Barthe (red card) 89'	Stadium: Vasil Levski; Attendance: 4,210; Referee: Stefan Spasov (Pernik)

19 September 2010 7	Slavia	1–0	CSKA	Sofia
16:00 EEST	Peev 15'; Dyakov (yellow card) 41'; Kunchev (yellow card) 44'; Manshrov (yellow card) 59'; Dimitrov (yellow card) 61'; Kolev (yellow card) 86'; Genev (yellow card) 90'	Report	Grillo (yellow card) 38'; Stoyanov (yellow card) 61'	Stadium: Ovcha Kupel; Attendance: 2,500; Referee: Anton Genov (Sofia)

25 September 2010 8	CSKA	2–0	Montana	Sofia
21:00 EEST	Sheridan 59', 90+4'; Galchev (yellow card) 42'; Delev (yellow card) 54'; Marquinhos (yellow card) 71'; Michel Platini (yellow card) 77'	Report	Antonov (yellow card) 24'; Gadzhev (yellow card) 42'; Lichkov (yellow card) 72'	Stadium: Vasil Levski; Attendance: 490; Referee: Ahmed Ahmed (Burgas)

4 October 2010 9	Lokomotiv Sofia	2–2	CSKA	Sofia
21:00 EEST	Pisarov 11', (yellow card) 12'; Genkov 25'; Dyakov (yellow card) 22'; Romanov (yellow card) 74'	Report	Marquinhos 73', 90+4' (pen.), (yellow card) 88'; Minev (yellow card) 52'; Michel Platini (yellow card) 86'; Yanchev (yellow card) 87'	Stadium: Vasil Levski; Attendance: 450; Referee: Ivaylo Stoyanov (Petrich)

17 October 2010 10	CSKA	0–0	Kaliakra	Sofia
21:00 EEST	Minev (yellow card) 30'	Report	I. Petkov (yellow card) 75'	Stadium: Vasil Levski; Attendance: 450; Referee: Ivan Kirilov (Varna)

24 October 2010 11	Minyor	2–4	CSKA	Pernik
15:00 EEST	Janković 39', (yellow card) 90'; Gospodinov 81'; Trajanov (yellow card) 13'	Report	Marquinhos 23', 55'; Delev 34'; Aquaro 44'; Nelson (yellow card) 33'; Galchev (yellow card) 54'	Stadium: Minyor; Attendance: 3,920; Referee: Aleksandar Kostadinov (Sofia)

30 October 2010 12	CSKA	3–2	Beroe	Sofia
15:00 EEST	Delev 57', 72'; Marquinhos 90+3'; Delev (yellow card) 61'; Minev (yellow card) 83'	Report	Velev 49'; Yordanov 79'; Genchev (yellow card) 65'; Mladenov (yellow card) 83'; Bachev (yellow card) 88'	Stadium: Vasil Levski; Attendance: 680; Referee: Angel Angelov (Sofia)

8 November 2010 13	Pirin	0–1	CSKA	Blagoevgrad
14:00 EET	Moldovanov (yellow card) 90'	Report	Delev 12', (yellow card) 66' (yellow-red card) 82'; Minev (yellow card) 62'	Stadium: Hristo Botev; Attendance: 2,000; Referee: Georgi Kabakov (Plovdiv)

14 November 2010 14	CSKA	1–0	Lokomotiv Plovdiv	Sofia
18:00 EET	Marquinhos 53'; Yanev (yellow card) 34'; Stoyanov (yellow card) 66'; Saidhodzha (yellow card) 90+3'	Report	Krachunov (yellow card) 6'; Kotsev (yellow card) 33'; Kotev (yellow card) 38'; S. Bengelloun (yellow card) 41'; Y. Bengelloun (yellow card) 69'; Zlatinski (yellow card) 86'	Stadium: Vasil Levski; Attendance: 3,380; Referee: Anton Genov (Sofia)

28 November 2010 15	Akademik	1–1	CSKA	Sofia
14:00 EET	Mbemba 12'; Petkov (yellow card) 43'; Redovski (yellow card) 57'; Mihaylov (yellow card) 90+2'	Report	Michel Platini 45'; Galchev (yellow card) 83'	Stadium: Ovcha Kupel; Attendance: 500; Referee: Aleksandar Kostadinov (Sofia)

26 February 2011 16	Levski	1–3	CSKA	Sofia
18:00 EET	Stoyanov 74' (o.g.); Tasevski (yellow card) 4'; Yovov (red card) 69'; Minev (yellow card) 84'; Miliev (yellow card) 90+1'	Report	Michel Platini 33', 48'; Popov 65'; Tonev (yellow card) 18' (red card) 69'; Trifonov (yellow card) 72'; Delev (yellow card) 83'; Marquinhos (yellow card) 90+3'	Stadium: Georgi Asparuhov; Attendance: 18,000; Referee: Anton Genov (Sofia)

5 March 2011 17	Chernomorets	0–4	CSKA	Burgas
18:00 EET	Hajri (yellow card) 55'	Report	Michel Platini 17', 56'; Delev 24', 87'; Galchev (yellow card) 59'	Stadium: Lazur; Attendance: 3,000; Referee: Aleksandar Kostadinov (Sofia)

13 March 2011 18	CSKA	1–0	Vidima-Rakovski	Kavarna
18:00 EET	Delev 49'; Marquinhos (yellow card) 80'	Report	Ashimov (yellow card) 50'	Stadium: Kavarna; Attendance: 4,000; Referee: Nikola Popov (Sofia)

20 March 2011 19	Cherno More	1–0	CSKA	Varna
15:05 EET	Atanasov 79'; Bozhilov (yellow card) 11'; S. Aleksandrov (yellow card) 16'; Atanasov (yellow card) 77'; Ademar (yellow card) 85'; Ratnikov (yellow card) 87'	Report	Yanev (yellow card) 21'; Delev (yellow card) 42'; K. Stoyanov (yellow card) 48'; Bandalovski (yellow card) 63'; Marquinhos (yellow card) 64'; Karadzhov (yellow card) 87'	Stadium: Ticha; Attendance: 3,500; Referee: Ivaylo Stoyanov (Petrich)

1 April 2011 20	CSKA	2–0	Sliven	Sofia
18:00 EEST	Delev 8', 31'; Tonev (yellow card) 83'	Report	Tsirkov (yellow card) 17'; Bakalov (yellow card) 48'; Stefanov (yellow card) 58'; Petrov (yellow card) 72'	Stadium: Vasil Levski; Attendance: 1,500; Referee: Georgi Dimitrov (Sofia)

10 April 2011 21	Litex	0–0	CSKA	Lovech
21:00 EEST	Yanev (yellow card) 4'	Report	Galchev (yellow card) 20' (yellow-red card) 86'; Marquinhos (yellow card) 42'; Karadzhov (yellow card) 51'	Stadium: Lovech; Attendance: 4,950; Referee: Tasko Taskov (Sofia)

16 April 2011 22	CSKA	1–0	Slavia	Sofia
21:00 EEST	Nelson 3'; Gargorov (yellow card) 69'; Karadzhov (yellow card) 90+2'	Report	Mansharov (yellow card) 80'	Stadium: Vasil Levski; Attendance: 2,500; Referee: Bogomil Marinov (Sofia)

25 April 2011 23	Montana	1–4	CSKA	Montana
15:00 EEST	Hristov 81'; Nikolov (yellow card) 72'	Report	Nelson 32'; Aquaro 45'; Michel Platini 62'; Tonev 74'	Stadium: Ogosta; Attendance: 3,500; Referee: Ivaylo Stoyanov (Petrich)

30 April 2011 24	CSKA	3–1	Lokomotiv Sofia	Sofia
21:00 EEST	Delev 40'; Michel Platini 57'; K. Stoyanov 62'; Galchev (yellow card) 45+1'; Bandalovski (yellow card) 83'	Report	Dafchev 90+1'; Dyakov (yellow card) 13'	Stadium: Balgarska Armiya; Attendance: 3,000; Referee: Ahmed Ahmed (Burgas)

4 May 2011 25	Kaliakra	0–3	CSKA	Kavarna
19:00 EEST	A. Dimitrov (yellow card) 45'; A. Petrov (yellow card) 54'; Kateliev (yellow card) 66'	Report	Gargorov 45+1'; Nelson 69'; Galchev 75'	Stadium: Kavarna; Attendance: 750; Referee: Georgi Yordanov (Gabrovo)

7 May 2011 26	CSKA	2–0	Minyor	Sofia
21:00 EEST	Michel Platini 45+1', 56'; K. Stoyanov (yellow card) 80'	Report	Bozhikov (yellow card) 70'; Vasilev (yellow card) 88'	Stadium: Balgarska Armiya; Attendance: 1,500; Referee: Stefan Apostolov (Blagoevgrad)

15 May 2011 27	Beroe	0–2	CSKA	Stara Zagora
18:00 EEST	Bozhanov (yellow card) 89'	Report	Michel Platini 36'; Delev 43'; K. Stoyanov (yellow card) 82'; Galchev (yellow card) 86'	Stadium: Beroe; Attendance: 7,640; Referee: Aleksandar Kostadinov (Sofia)

18 May 2011 28	CSKA	2–2	Pirin	Sofia
18:00 EEST	Trifonov 65'; Popov 82'; Michel Platini (yellow card) 31'	Report	Iliev 51'; Tsvetkov 83'; Vodenicharov (yellow card) 33'; Kostadinov (yellow card) 59'; Bengyuzov (yellow card) 88'	Stadium: Balgarska Armiya; Attendance: 880; Referee: Stoyan Denev (Veliko Tarnovo)

21 May 2011 29	Lokomotiv Plovdiv	4–1	CSKA	Plovdiv
18:00 EEST	Kavdanski 9'; Rodrigues 15'; Zlatinski 18', 70'	Report	Gargorov 3'; Yanev (yellow card) 44'; K. Stoyanov (yellow card) 52'	Stadium: Lokomotiv; Attendance: 6,170; Referee: Georgi Yordanov (Gabrovo)

28 May 2011 30	CSKA	3–1	Akademik	Sofia
18:00 EEST	Kostov 38'; Sheridan 71'; Delev 89'; Marquinhos (yellow card) 42'	Report	Vasilev 41', (yellow card) 80'; Ivanov (yellow card) 26'; Bonfim (yellow card) 44'; Sakaliev (yellow card) 64'	Stadium: Balgarska Armiya; Attendance: 650; Referee: Kalin Lyudmilov (Sofia)

=== Bulgarian Cup ===
20 November 2010 Second Round	Sliven	1–3	CSKA	Sliven
14:00 EET	Vasilev 23'; Mindev (yellow card) 18'	Report	Yanchev 57'; Delev 71'; Sheridan 90+3'; Minev (yellow card) 80'; Tonev (yellow card) 89'	Stadium: Hadzhi Dimitar; Attendance: 2,000; Referee: Ahmed Ahmed (Aytos)

11 December 2010 Third Round	Malesh	0–3	CSKA	Mikrevo
13:00 EET	Kolushev (yellow card) 66'	Report	Delev 60', 74'; Sheridan 64'	Stadium: Gradski; Attendance: 3,500; Referee: Nikolay Yordanov (Sofia)

5 April 2011 Quarter-final	CSKA	2–0	Cherno More	Sofia
18:00 EEST	Delev 34'; Marquinhos 67'; Bandalovski (yellow card) 82'	Report	Bozhilov (yellow card) 43'; Tiago (yellow card) 46'; A. Aleksandrov (yellow card) 50' (yellow-red card) 60'; Petkov (yellow card) 58'; Kolev (yellow card) 84'	Stadium: Vasil Levski; Attendance: 7,000; Referee: Georgi Yordanov (Gabrovo)

20 April 2011 Semi-final	CSKA	2–1	Litex	Sofia
21:00 EEST	Delev 28', 87', (yellow card) 90+2'; Galchev (yellow card) 76'; Popov (yellow card) 90+4'	Report	G. Milanov 68'; Berberović (yellow card) 22'; Doka (yellow card) 35'; Todorov (yellow card) 45+2'; Jelenković (yellow card) 81'	Stadium: Balgarska Armiya; Attendance: 14,000; Referee: Anton Genov (Sofia)

25 May 2011 Final	CSKA	1–0	Slavia	Sofia
19:00 EET	Delev 39', (yellow card) 90+3'; Marquinhos (yellow card) 82'; Nelson (yellow card) 90+1'	Report	Dimitrov (yellow card) 21'; Basso (yellow card) 55' (yellow-red card) 89'; Kushev (yellow card) 89'	Stadium: Vasil Levski; Attendance: 14,920; Referee: Ivaylo Stoyanov (Petrich)

=== Europa League ===
==== Third qualifying round ====
27 July 2010 First leg	CSKA (Bulgaria)	3–0	(Northern Ireland) Cliftonville	Sofia, Bulgaria
19:00 EEST	Vidanov 9'; Marquinhos 72'; Trifonov 74'; Galchev (yellow card) 39'; D. Iliev (yellow card) 87'	Report	Garrett (yellow card) 19' (yellow-red card) 84'; Scannell (yellow card) 90+3'	Stadium: Vasil Levski; Attendance: 3,000; Referee: Gediminas Mažeika (Lithuania)

5 August 2010 Second leg	Cliftonville (Northern Ireland)	1–2 (1–5 agg.)	(Bulgaria) CSKA	Belfast, Northern Ireland
21:45 EEST	Boyce 42'; Scannell (yellow card) 28'; Donaghy (yellow card) 61' (yellow-red card) 63'; McMullan (yellow card) 64'; Catney (yellow card) 74'	Report	Kostadinov 85'; Marquinhos 88'; Yanev (yellow card) 74'	Stadium: Windsor Park; Attendance: 270; Referee: Maksim Layushkin (Russia)

==== Play-off round ====
19 August 2010 First leg	CSKA (Bulgaria)	3–0	(Wales) The New Saints	Sofia, Bulgaria
21:30 EEST	Aquaro (yellow card) 45', (goal) 81'; Nelson 82'; Delev 90'; Galchev (yellow card) 36'; Saidhodzha (yellow card) 61'	Report	Hogan (yellow card) 18'	Stadium: Vasil Levski; Attendance: 2,950; Referee: Hannes Kaasik (Estonia)

26 August 2010 Second leg	The New Saints (Wales)	2–2 (2–5 agg.)	(Bulgaria) CSKA	Wrexham, Wales
21:35 EEST	M. Williams 14'; Evans 62'; Baker (yellow card) 25'; M. Williams (yellow card) 37' (yellow-red card) 66'	Report	Aquaro 11'; Tiboni 80'; Karadzhov (yellow card) 65'	Stadium: Racecourse Ground; Attendance: 843; Referee: Tony Asumaa (Finland)

==== Group stage ====
Pos	Team	Pld	W	D	L	GF	GA	GD	Pts	Qualification	POR	BJK	RPD	CSS
1	(Portugal) Porto	6	5	1	0	14	4	+10	16	Advance to knockout phase	—	1–1	3–0	3–1
2	(Turkey) Beşiktaş	6	4	1	1	9	6	+3	13	Advance to knockout phase	1–3	—	2–0	1–0
3	(Austria) Rapid Wien	6	1	0	5	5	12	−7	3		1–3	1–2	—	1–2
4	(Bulgaria) CSKA Sofia	6	1	0	5	4	10	−6	3		0–1	1–2	0–2	—

Source: Soccerway

16 September 2010 1	Beşiktaş (Turkey)	1–0	(Bulgaria) CSKA	Istanbul, Turkey
22:05 EEST	Ernst 90'	Report	Stoyanov (yellow card) 57'; Aquaro (yellow card) 90+3'	Stadium: BJK İnönü; Attendance: 25,035; Referee: Laurent Duhamel (France)

30 September 2010 2	CSKA (Bulgaria)	0–1	(Portugal) Porto	Sofia, Bulgaria
20:00 EEST	Aquaro (yellow card) 78'	Report	Falcao 16'; Săpunaru (yellow card) 84'	Stadium: Vasil Levski; Attendance: 13,060; Referee: Alon Yefet (Israel)

21 October 2010 3	CSKA (Bulgaria)	0–2	(Austria) Rapid Vienna	Sofia, Bulgaria
20:00 EEST	Tiboni (yellow card) 47'	Report	Vennegoor of Hesselink 28'; Hofmann 32'; Kavlak (yellow card) 13'; Heikkinen (yellow card) 40'	Stadium: Vasil Levski; Attendance: 7,996; Referee: Leontios Trattou (Cyprus)

4 November 2010 4	Rapid Vienna (Austria)	1–2	(Bulgaria) CSKA	Vienna, Austria
22:05 EET	Salihi 56' (pen.); Drazan (yellow card) 67'; Pehlivan (yellow card) 77'	Report	Yanchev 50', (yellow card) 51'; Marquinhos 64', (yellow card) 77'; Nelson (yellow card) 39'; Aquaro (yellow card) 59'; Stoyanov (yellow card) 90+1'; Galchev (yellow card) 90+2'	Stadium: Ernst-Happel-Stadion; Attendance: 50,000; Referee: Simon Lee Evans (Wales)

2 December 2010 5	CSKA (Bulgaria)	1–2	(Turkey) Beşiktaş	Sofia, Bulgaria
20:00 EET	Sheridan 79'; Yanchev (yellow card) 58'; Yanev (yellow card) 86'	Report	Zápotočný 58'; Hološko 64'; Köybaşı (yellow card) 27'; Hilbert (yellow card) 84'	Stadium: Vasil Levski; Attendance: 9,100; Referee: Tom Harald Hagen (Norway)

15 December 2010 6	Porto (Portugal)	3–1	(Bulgaria) CSKA	Porto, Portugal
22:05 EET	Otamendi 22'; Rúben Micael 54'; Rodríguez 90+3'	Report	Delev 48'; Sheridan (yellow card) 81'	Stadium: Estádio do Dragão; Referee: Claudio Circhetta (Switzerland)

== UEFA Club Rankings ==
This is the current UEFA Club Rankings, including season 2009–10.

Rank	Team	Points	Mvmnt
107	(Italy) Genoa	17.867	(0)
108	Austria Wien	16.915	▼ (−40)
109	(Netherlands) Feyenoord	16.309	▼ (−29)
110	(Bulgaria) Litex Lovech	15.900	▼ (−1)
111	(Romania) CFR Cluj	15.898	▲ (+7)
112	(Bulgaria) CSKA Sofia	15.400	▲ (+3)
113	(Denmark) OB	14.970	▲ (+11)
114	(Ukraine) Dnipro Dnipropetrovsk	14.910	▼ (−27)
115	(Italy) Napoli (Italy) Empoli (Italy) Chievo	14.867	▼ (−3)
118	(Germany) Borussia Dortmund	14.841	▲ (+1)
119	(Croatia) Dinamo Zagreb	14.466	▼ (−11)

== See also ==
- PFC CSKA Sofia
