= 2011 Bulgarian Cup final =

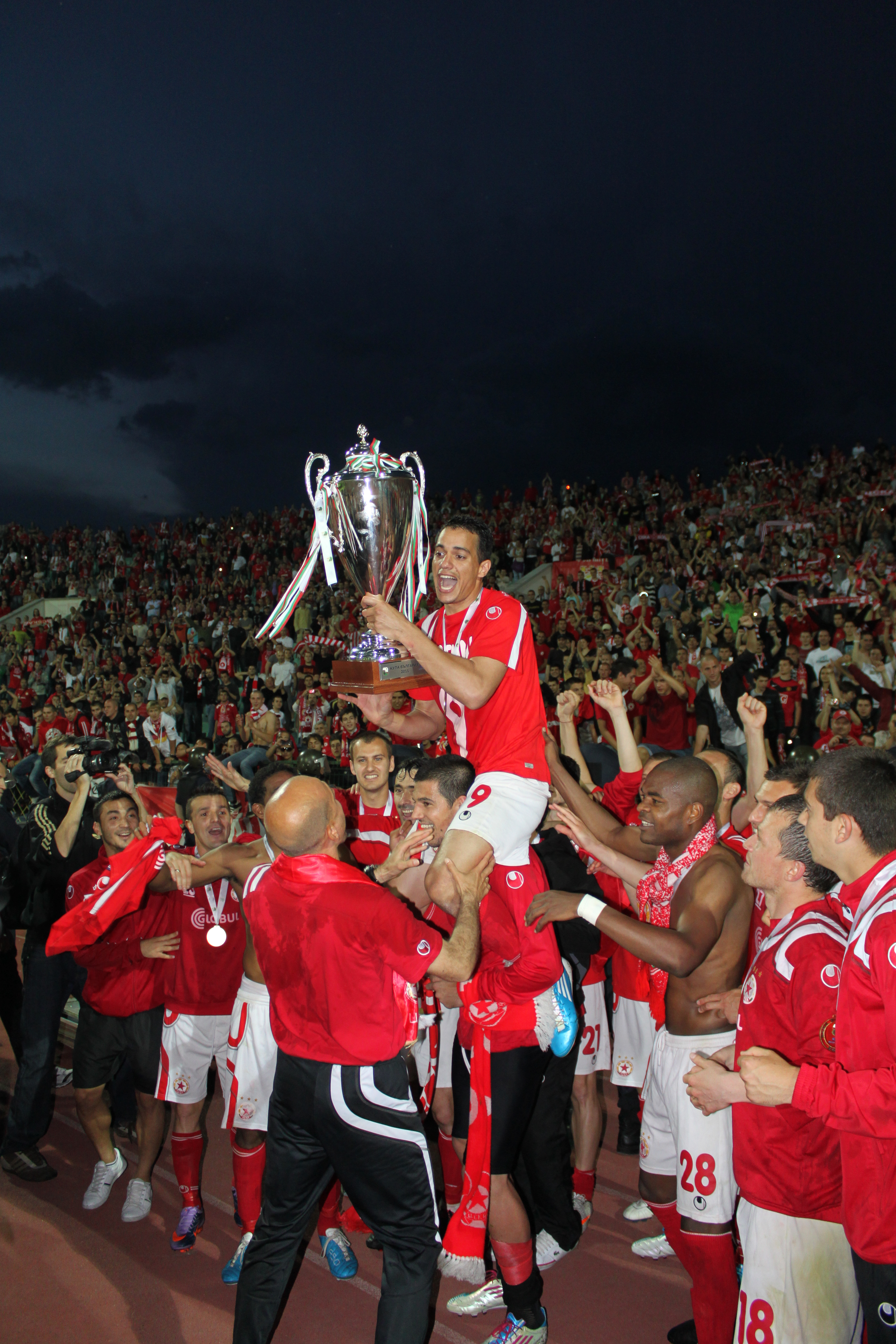
- Event: 2010–11 Bulgarian Cup
CSKA Sofia	Slavia Sofia
A Group	A Group
1	0
- Date: 25 May 2011
- Venue: Vasil Levski, Sofia
- Man of the Match: Spas Delev
- Referee: Ivaylo Stoyanov (Petrich)
- Attendance: 17,500

The 2011 Bulgarian Cup final was the 71st final of the Bulgarian Cup. The match took place on 25 May 2011 at Vasil Levski National Stadium in Sofia. The match was contested by CSKA Sofia, who beat Litex Lovech 2–1 in their semi-final, and Slavia Sofia who beat Pirin Blagoevgrad 7–6 on penalties after a 1–1 draw after extra time. CSKA won the final 1–0, claiming their twenty Bulgarian Cup triumph, with forward Spas Delev scoring the only goal of the game in the 39th minute.

== Background ==
Up to the 2011 final, CSKA Sofia had reached the Bulgarian Cup Final 32 times, winning nineteen of them, while Slavia Sofia had won seven of their ten finals.

== Route to the final ==
CSKA Sofia		Round	Slavia Sofia	
Sliven 2000; A 3–1	Yanchev 56', Delev 72', Sheridan 90'	Second round	Ludogorets; A 2–0	Bozhov 18', 45'
Malesh; A 3–0	Delev 60', 73', Sheridan 64'	Third round	Etar; A 1–0	Dimitrov 40'
Cherno More; H 2–0	Delev 34', Marquinhos 67'	Quarter-final	Chernomorets; A 4–4 aet 5–3 pen	Bozhov 16', 90', Kushev 69', Moldovanov 102'; Penalties: Bozhov (penalty scored) , Kushev (penalty scored) , Mansharov (penalty scored) , Dimitrov (penalty scored) , Jose Junior (penalty scored)
Litex; H 2–1	Delev 27', 87'	Semi-final	Pirin; H 1–1 aet 7–6 pen	Peev 45'; Penalties: Hristov (penalty scored) , Bozhov (penalty scored) , Peev (penalty scored) , Mansharov (penalty scored) , Jose Junior (penalty scored) , Filipov (penalty scored) , Dimitrov (penalty missed) , Moldovanov (penalty scored)

== Pre-match ==
=== Match ball ===
The match ball for the 2011 Bulgarian Cup Final was the Puma PowerCat 1.10. The ball has an irregular 20-panel configuration. The ball will be used only for the final.

=== Officials ===
Petrich-based referee Ivaylo Stoyanov was named as the referee for the 2011 Bulgarian Cup Final on 23 May 2011. His assistants for the 2011 final were Nikolay Angelov and Ventsislav Gavrilov, with Tasko Taskov as the fourth official.

== Match ==
Match statistics
	CSKA Sofia	Slavia Sofia
Goals scored	1	0
Total shots	11	5
Shots on target	4	3
Ball possession	65%	35%
Corner kicks	6	1
Fouls committed	23	19
Yellow cards	3	4
Red cards	0	1

=== Summary ===
A goal six minutes before the interval from right winger Spas Delev gave Milen Radukanov’s team victory. The goal capped off a remarkable achievement from Delev, who found the net in every round of the competition. Delev finished smartly for his goal in the 39th minute, placing home from six yards. Slavia striker Nikolay Bozhov should have equalised two minutes later, only to be denied by a good save from CSKA goalkeeper Ivan Karadzhov.

There were several chances in the last 20 minutes and CSKA should have gone 2-0 up when Gregory Nelson was played through, but he missed his chance. It nearly proved costly as Karadzhov spilled a shot soon after, but Radoslav Dimitrov missed in the goalmouth scramble as CSKA lifted the cup for the first time since they beat Cherno More Varna 3-1 in the 2006 final. Slavia ended the game with 10 men after Brazilian defender Josias Basso was sent off in the closing stages.

=== Details ===
25 May 2011
19:00 EET

CSKA Sofia	1–0	Slavia Sofia
Delev 39'	Report

Vasil Levski, Sofia
Attendance: 17,500
Referee: Ivaylo Stoyanov (Petrich)

CSKA	Slavia

CSKA:
GK	12	(Bulgaria) Ivan Karadzhov
RB	11	(Bulgaria) Ivan Bandalovski
CB	6	(Italy) Giuseppe Aquaro
CB	19	(Bulgaria) Apostol Popov
LB	8	(Bulgaria) Rumen Trifonov
DM	5	(Bulgaria) Todor Yanchev (c)
DM	18	(Bulgaria) Boris Galchev
AM	28	(Bulgaria) Marquinhos	(yellow card) 82'	(substituted off) 82'
RW	7	(Bulgaria) Spas Delev	(yellow card) 90+3'
LW	29	(Netherlands) Gregory Nelson	(yellow card) 90+1'	(substituted off) 90'
CF	9	(Brazil) Michel Platini		(substituted off) 76'
Substitutes:
GK	88	(Bulgaria) Blagoy Makendzhiev
MF	21	(Bulgaria) Kosta Yanev
MF	22	(Bulgaria) Petar Stoyanov		(substituted on) 82'
MF	23	(Bulgaria) Emil Gargorov
MF	24	(Bulgaria) Aleksandar Tonev		(substituted on) 76'
FW	26	(Republic of Ireland) Cillian Sheridan		(substituted on) 90'
FW	27	(Bulgaria) Stanko Yovchev
Manager:
(Bulgaria) Milen Radukanov

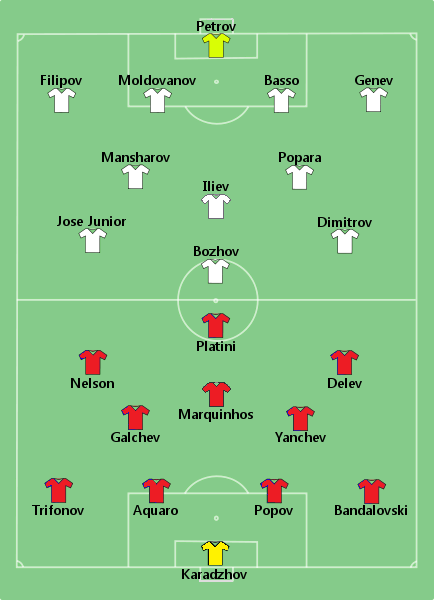

Slavia:
GK	1	(Bulgaria) Emil Petrov (c)
RB	18	(Bulgaria) Filip Filipov
CB	4	(Brazil) Josias Basso	(yellow card) 55' (yellow-red card) 89'
CB	35	(Bulgaria) Diyan Moldovanov
LB	22	(Bulgaria) Viktor Genev
DM	27	(Israel) Tom Mansharov
DM	8	(Serbia) Pavle Popara		(substituted off) 58'
AM	7	(Bulgaria) Iliya Iliev		(substituted off) 53'
RW	44	(Brazil) José Júnior		(substituted off) 78'
LW	20	(Bulgaria) Radoslav Dimitrov	(yellow card) 21'
CF	17	(Bulgaria) Nikolay Bozhov
Substitutes:
GK	12	(Bulgaria) Stefano Kunchev
MF	5	(Bulgaria) Spas Georgiev		(substituted on) 53'
FW	9	(Bulgaria) Georgi Hristov		(substituted on) 58'
MF	10	(Bulgaria) Yordan Yurukov
FW	19	(Bulgaria) Martin Kushev	(yellow card) 89'	(substituted on) 78'
DF	25	(Nigeria) Victor Deniran
MF	77	(Bulgaria) Daniel Peev
Manager:
(Bulgaria) Emil Velev

MAN OF THE MATCH

- (Bulgaria) Spas Delev (CSKA Sofia)

MATCH OFFICIALS

- Assistant referees:
  - Nikolay Angelov
  - Ventsislav Gavrilov
- Fourth official: Tasko Taskov

MATCH RULES

- 90 minutes.
- 30 minutes of extra-time if necessary.
- Penalty shoot-out if scores still level.
- Seven named substitutes.
- Maximum of three substitutions.

== See also ==
- 2010–11 A Group
