= Tomi Kostadinov =

Bulgarian footballer

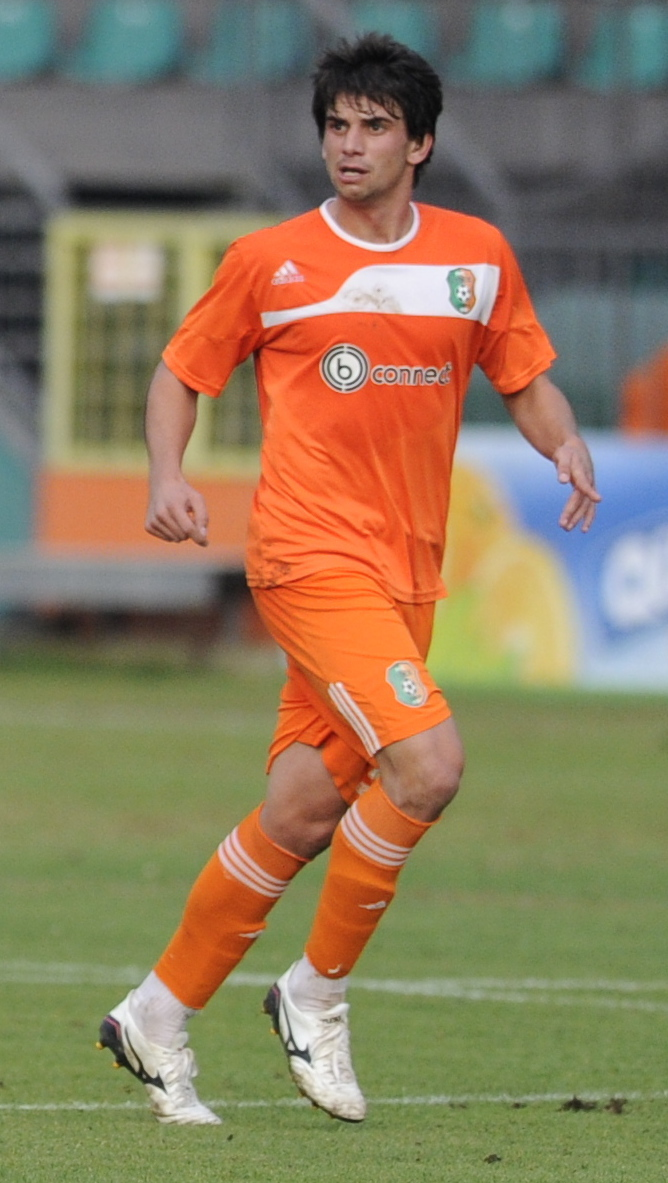

Personal information
- Full name: Tomi Kostadinov Kostadinov
- Date of birth: 15 March 1991 (age 35)
- Place of birth: Sofia, Bulgaria
- Height: 1.80 m (5 ft 11 in)
- Positions: Attacking midfielder; winger

Team information
- Current team: Vihren Sandanski
- Number: 10

Youth career
- CSKA Sofia

Senior career*
Years	Team	Apps	(Gls)
2009–2011	CSKA Sofia	9	(1)
2009–2010	→ Bdin Vidin (loan)	14	(0)
2011	→ Chavdar Etropole (loan)	13	(8)
2011–2013	Litex Lovech	18	(2)
2013–2014	Chania	28	(2)
2014	AZAL	14	(3)
2015	Minyor Pernik	12	(1)
2015–2016	Vitosha Bistritsa	26	(10)
2016	Pirin Gotse Delchev	12	(11)
2017	Bregalnica Štip	12	(0)
2017	Chalkida	6	(0)
2018–2019	Panthiraikos	28	(5)
2019–2021	Sportist Svoge	40	(12)
2021–2022	Vitosha Bistritsa	41	(10)
2023–	Vihren Sandanski	96	(17)

International career
2010–2011	Bulgaria U21	5	(1)
- * Club domestic league appearances and goals as of 11 June 2026

Tomi Kostadinov Kostadinov (Bulgarian: Томи Костадинов Костадинов; born 15 March 1991) is a Bulgarian footballer who plays as a midfielder for Vihren Sandanski.

== Career ==
In July 2014, Kostadinov moved to Azerbaijan Premier League team AZAL, before having his contract terminated by mutual consent in January 2015, and signing for PFC Minyor Pernik. In the summer of 2015, he signed with Vitosha Bistritsa in the third division of Bulgarian football.

== Career statistics ==
=== Club ===
As of 24 December 2014

Club performance			League		Cup		Continental		Total	
Season	Club	League	Apps	Goals	Apps	Goals	Apps	Goals	Apps	Goals
2010-11	CSKA Sofia	A PFG	6	0	0	0	4	1	10	1
2011–12	Chavdar Etropole	B PFG	13	8			—		13	8
2011–12	Litex Lovech	A PFG	2	0	0	0	—		2	0
2012–13	Litex Lovech	A PFG	16	2	4	1	—		20	3
2013–14	Chania	Football League	28	2	1	0	—		29	2
2014–15	AZAL	Azerbaijan Premier League	13	3	1	0	—		14	3
Total	Bulgaria		36	10	4	1	4	1	44	12
Total	Greece		28	2	1	0	—		29	2
Total	Azerbaijan		14	3	1	0	—		15	3
Career total			78	15	6	1	4	1	88	17

== Personal life ==
Kostadinov is religious and observes Saturday rather than Sunday as a non-working day (he does not train or participate in matches held on Saturdays).
