= Cillian Sheridan =

Irish footballer

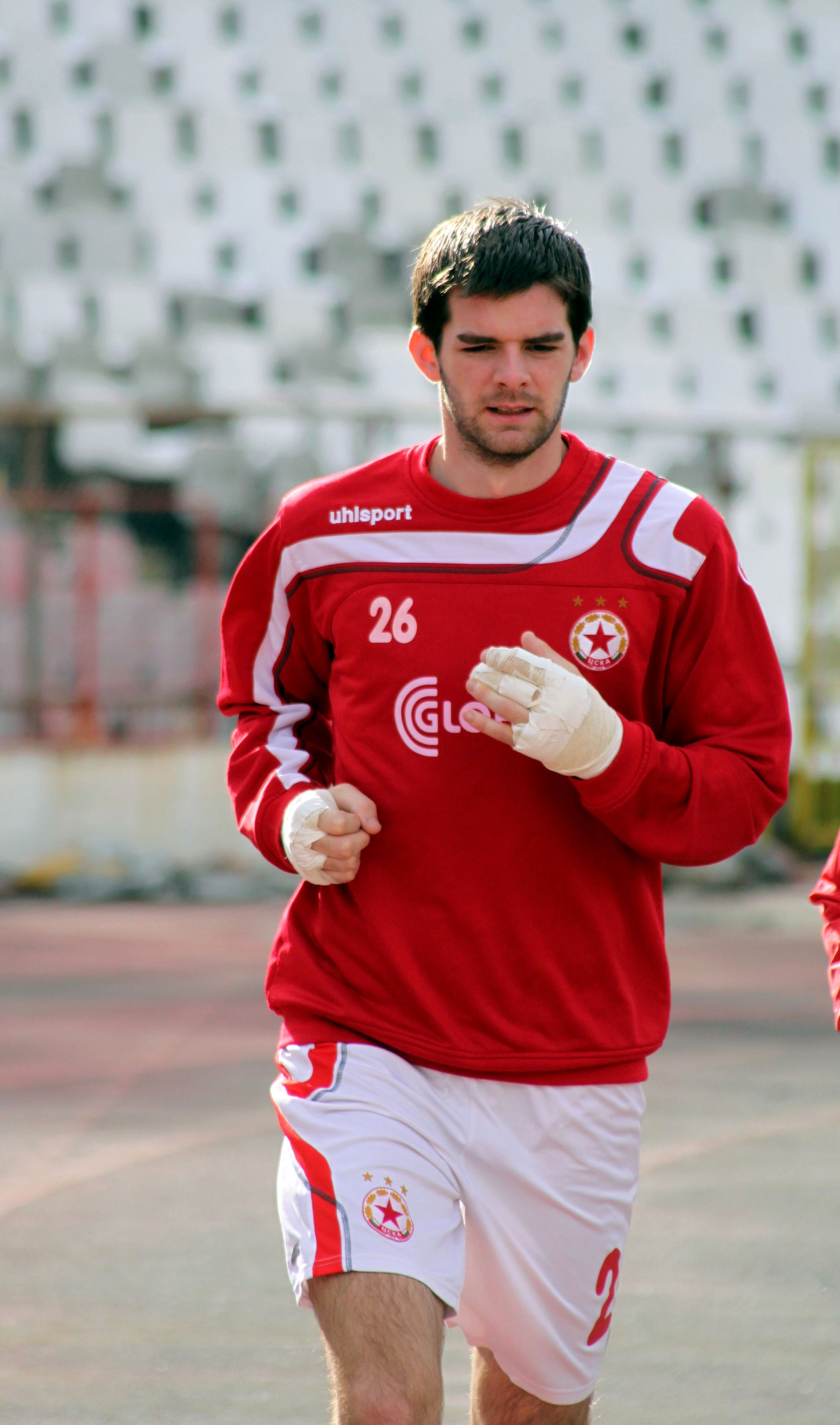
- Sheridan with CSKA Sofia in 2010

Personal information
- Full name: Cillian Sheridan
- Date of birth: 23 February 1989 (age 37)
- Place of birth: Bailieborough, Ireland
- Height: 1.96 m (6 ft 5 in)
- Position: Forward

Youth career
- Bailieboro Celtic
- Belvedere
- 2006: Celtic

Senior career*
Years	Team	Apps	(Gls)
2006–2010	Celtic	14	(4)
2009	→ Motherwell (loan)	13	(2)
2009–2010	→ Plymouth Argyle (loan)	13	(0)
2010	→ St Johnstone (loan)	16	(6)
2010–2012	CSKA Sofia	19	(4)
2011–2012	→ St Johnstone (loan)	28	(4)
2012–2013	Kilmarnock	26	(9)
2013–2015	APOEL	46	(8)
2015–2017	Omonia	54	(23)
2017–2018	Jagiellonia Białystok	52	(17)
2019	Wellington Phoenix	17	(1)
2019–2020	Ironi Kiryat Shmona	19	(4)
2020–2021	Wisła Płock	30	(2)
2021–2023	Dundee	19	(0)
2023–2024	Inverness Caledonian Thistle	9	(0)
2024	Queen's Park	12	(4)
2024–2026	Brechin City	40	(18)

International career
2009–2010	Republic of Ireland U21	10	(2)
2010	Republic of Ireland	3	(0)
- * Club domestic league appearances and goals as of 7 June 2026

Cillian Sheridan (born 23 February 1989) is an Irish professional footballer who plays as a forward.

Sheridan began his career with Celtic in 2006, but a lack of first team opportunities saw him being loaned to other Scottish clubs. In 2010, he switched clubs and countries joining CSKA Sofia of Bulgaria, from where he was loaned to Scottish side St Johnstone in 2011. After playing for Kilmarnock between 2012 and 2013, he signed for defending Cypriot champions APOEL. In both his seasons with the club, he won the double. Subsequently, he moved to rivals Omonia.

After stints in Poland, New Zealand and Israel, Sheridan returned to Scotland with Dundee for two injury-plagued seasons. In 2023 he signed a short-term deal with Inverness Caledonian Thistle until early 2024, and spent the remainder of the season with Queen's Park where he enjoyed a return to form. The following season saw Sheridan join Highland League club Brechin City and earn a double-digit goal tally in a tight title race.

He earned three international caps for the Republic of Ireland in 2010.

== Club career ==
=== Early years ===
Born in Bailieborough, County Cavan, Sheridan grew up playing Gaelic football for Bailieborough Shamrocks. He began playing the association code with Bailieboro Celtic before travelling to Dublin to play for Belvedere, where he received call-ups for Irish youth squads. During his time at Belvedere, Sheridan chose to focus on his football career, having turned down an offer to join Australian rules club Brisbane Lions. He had trials with several clubs before being offered a contract by Scottish Premier League club Celtic, which he accepted.

=== Celtic ===
After joining Celtic in the summer of 2006, Sheridan was promoted to the reserve team and then the first team squad during his first season at the club, a "spectacular rise" according to coach Joe McBride.

He made his first team debut for Celtic in the Scottish Cup quarter-finals against Inverness Caledonian Thistle on 25 February 2007, as a 73rd-minute substitute for Mark Wilson in a 2–1 away victory. He signed a new three-year contract with the club two days later. On 20 May 2007, the final game of the season, he made his league debut against Hibernian, playing the final two minutes of a 2–1 defeat at Easter Road in place of Craig Beattie. Sheridan made his European debut on 21 October 2008, coming on as a substitute for Scott McDonald in Celtic's Champions League game against Manchester United at Old Trafford. He also started in the return game at Celtic Park on 5 November 2008, a 1–1 draw. Just four days after his European debut, Sheridan made his first league start against Hibernian, scoring the second goal of a 4–2 win.

=== Loan moves ===
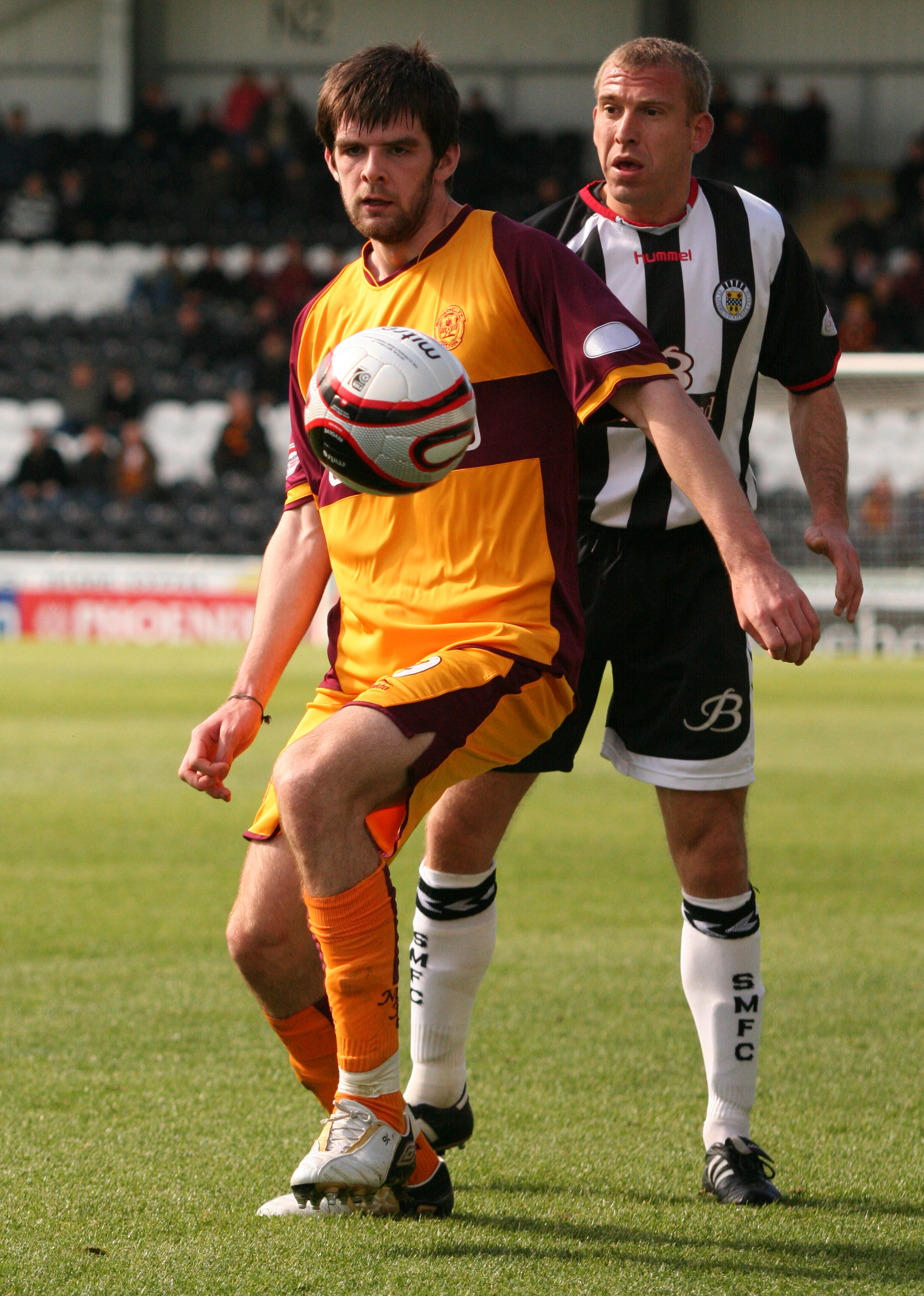
Sheridan playing for Motherwell against St Mirren in May 2009

On 2 February 2009 Sheridan signed for Motherwell on loan until the end of the season, to replace Chris Porter, who had signed for Derby County the previous day. He made his debut five days later, coming on as a second-half substitute in a 1–1 draw with St Mirren in the Scottish Cup. He made his first start and league debut a week later on Valentine's Day in Motherwell's 1–0 win over Hamilton, playing the entire 90 minutes as his strike partner David Clarkson scored the only goal of the game. Sheridan scored his first league goal for The Well a fortnight later, the winner in a 2–1 victory at Inverness. His only other goal for Motherwell came near the end of the season in a 3–0 win over Hamilton.

On 13 August 2009, Sheridan joined Plymouth Argyle on a six-month loan deal. He made his debut in a 1–1 draw against Queens Park Rangers. He played 14 times for the Championship team but failed to find the net.

Sheridan completed his loan spell at Plymouth and returned to Celtic on 14 January 2010. Later the same day he was again loaned out, this time to St Johnstone for the rest of the season. On his debut, on 17 February, he scored two goals in a 5–1 win against Hibernian. On 30 March he scored the opening goal for St Johnstone in a 4–1 win over Rangers.

=== CSKA Sofia ===
Sheridan signed a three-year contract with Bulgarian club CSKA Sofia on 13 August 2010. Sheridan made his debut in the 2–2 draw against League of Wales side The New Saints; CSKA won 5–2 on aggregate. He scored his first goal for the club in their 3–1 away win against Sliven. On 25 September, Sheridan scored twice in a 2–0 win against Montana. Changes of management, however, made it difficult for Sheridan to settle in Bulgaria.

=== Trials in the United States and loan to St Johnstone ===
On 7 June 2011, Sheridan appeared in a reserve match for American side Seattle Sounders FC. Sheridan started the game and scored in the 7th minute of a 2–0 victory over Vancouver Whitecaps FC. Following his spell with Seattle, Sheridan went on trial with their major rivals Portland Timbers, appearing for their reserve team. On 8 July, Sheridan joined SPL club Hibernian on trial, but instead decided to return to St Johnstone on a loan deal until January 2012. He made his second St Johnstone debut on 23 July against Aberdeen, and scored his first two goals of his second stint with the club against Hearts on 25 September. Sheridan scored four goals in 15 appearances before he was prevented from playing by a hamstring injury. In January 2012 St Johnstone and CSKA Sofia agreed to extend the loan deal until the end of the season.

=== Kilmarnock ===
After being released by CSKA Sofia, due to the club's financial problems, Sheridan signed a two-year contract with Scottish Premier League side Kilmarnock on 6 September 2012. Sheridan made his debut in a 2–1 loss against Hibernian on 15 September 2012. Seven days later on 22 September 2012, he scored his first goal when he opened the scoring in a 3–1 win over St Mirren. The following week, he scored a hat trick at Tynecastle in 3–1 victory over Hearts. After the match, teammate Manuel Pascali compared Sheridan comparison to former Kilmarnock striker Conor Sammon On 17 October 2012, Sheridan scored against his former club Celtic in a 2–0 win at Parkhead. Sheridan continued his goalscoring form into the second half of the season, but then suffered a hamstring injury which ruled him out for several weeks. During Sheridan's injury absence Kilmarnock signed Kris Boyd, and even after recovering from injury, Sheridan struggled to regain his first team place.

=== APOEL ===
On 20 June 2013, Sheridan signed a one-year contract, with the option of a further season with APOEL from Cyprus. He made his official debut on 17 August 2013 against Apollon Limassol in the Cypriot Super Cup final, in a match which APOEL won 1–0 and lifted the trophy. He scored his first official goal for APOEL on 7 December 2013, in his team's 2–0 away win against Ethnikos Achna for the Cypriot First Division. On 8 January 2014, he scored the only goal in APOEL's 1–0 home victory against AEL Limassol for that season's Cypriot Cup. On 5 February 2014, he gave his team the three important points after scoring the winning goal against Anorthosis in APOEL's 2–1 away win. On 29 March 2014, he scored the second goal of the match against Apollon Limassol, in APOEL's 3–0 home win for the Cypriot First Division play-offs. On 21 May 2014, Sheridan scored APOEL's second goal in the Cypriot Cup final against Ermis Aradippou and helped his team to lift the trophy after a 2–0 win. On 31 May 2014, Sheridan gave APOEL their 23rd Cypriot First Division title after scoring the only goal in the title decider match against AEL Limassol.

On 30 July 2014, Sheridan scored the equalizer against HJK Helsinki at Sonera Stadium, in APOEL's 2–2 first leg draw for the third qualifying round of the UEFA Champions League. One week later, he scored again in the return leg against HJK Helsinki, opening the scoring in APOEL's 2–0 home victory and advancement to the play-off round of the 2014–15 UEFA Champions League. On 26 August 2014, he scored the fourth goal in APOEL's 4–0 triumph over Aalborg BK for the UEFA Champions League play-off round, helping his team to reach the group stage of the UEFA Champions League. Sheridan appeared in every group stage match in APOEL's 2014–15 UEFA Champions League campaign. On 25 May 2015, one day after winning his second consecutive double with APOEL, the team announced that Sheridan was leaving the club as his contract would not be renewed.

=== Omonia ===
On 10 June 2015, Sheridan signed a contract with rival Cypriot club Omonia. He made his debut on 9 July in the second leg of the Europa League first round qualifying tie against Dinamo Batumi, helping his side to a 2–1 aggregate win. His first goal for his new club came on 23 July in the second leg of the next round qualifying tie against Jagiellonia Białystok, the only goal in a 1–0 win which saw his side qualify for the third qualifying round. He then scored two penalties on 6 August in a 2–2 draw with Brøndby in the Europa League third qualifying round second leg, but his team were eliminated on away goals.

Sheridan played his first league match for Omonia on 22 August 2016 at home against Nea Salamis. He levelled the match at 1–1 after 20 minutes, then helped his side come back from 3–1 down to win 5–3, scoring Omonia's fifth goal from the penalty spot in injury time. Sheridan went on to enjoy the most prolific season of his career to date, scoring a total of 15 goals in the league to add to the three he scored early in the season in the Europa League qualifying rounds.

=== Jagiellonia Białystok ===
On 28 February 2017, Sheridan signed a two-and-a-half-year contract, with Jagiellonia from Poland.

=== Wellington Phoenix ===
In January 2019, Sheridan signed with Wellington Phoenix who play in the Australian A-League until the end of the 2018–19 A-League season.

=== Ironi Kiryat Shmona ===
On 5 July 2019, Sheridan signed for the Israeli Premier League club Ironi Kiryat Shmona.

=== Wisła Płock ===
On 2 February 2020, Sheridan signed for Ekstraklasa club Wisła Płock.

=== Dundee ===
On 19 July 2021, after a trial period with the club, Sheridan made his return to Scottish football by signing a two-year deal with Scottish Premiership side Dundee. He made his debut in a Scottish League Cup win over Forfar Athletic. On 30 October in an away win against St Mirren, Sheridan suffered a ruptured Achilles tendon, which kept him out of action for the remainder of the season.

After playing his first competitive minutes in nearly a full year in an SPFL Reserve League match against Kilmarnock the previous week, Sheridan made his first team return for Dundee in a Scottish Challenge Cup victory away to Welsh champions The New Saints, in which Sheridan was credited with the opening goal, his first for the Dark Blues. On 8 February 2023, Sheridan would suffer yet more injury heartbreak, as his other Achilles tendon ruptured during a Challenge Cup game against Raith Rovers. Sheridan would win the Scottish Championship title with Dundee at the end of the season. On 31 May 2023, Dundee announced Sheridan had not been offered a new contract, but would continue to receive support from the club for his injury recovery.

=== Inverness Caledonian Thistle ===
On 26 October 2023, Sheridan signed for Scottish Championship club Inverness Caledonian Thistle on a short-term contract until January 2024. Sheridan made his debut off the bench two days later in a league win over Airdrieonians. On 14 January 2024, Inverness announced that Sheridan had departed the club following the end of his contract.

=== Queen's Park ===
On 22 February 2024, after having trained with the club for a couple of weeks, Sheridan joined Scottish Championship club Queen's Park on a deal until the end of the season. Sheridan made his debut for the Spiders two days later as a substitute away to Dundee United. Sheridan scored his first goal for the club in the following game, a 6–0 victory over Arbroath. Sheridan enjoyed a small career renaissance with the Spiders through a link-up with fellow Irishman Ruari Paton that was a big factor in the club confirming their Championship status at the end of the season. In May 2024, Queen's Park confirmed that Sheridan would leave the club upon the expiry of his contract.

=== Brechin City ===
On 5 December 2024, Sheridan joined Highland League club Brechin City on a permanent deal. He made his debut for the Hedgemen the following evening in a defeat to Banks o' Dee in the Highland League Cup. On 8 February 2025, Sheridan scored his first goal for Brechin in a league draw at home to Banks o' Dee. Sheridan would net 10 goals in 14 league appearances, but Brechin missed out on the Highland League title by goal difference to Brora Rangers.

== International career ==
Sheridan has been capped for the Republic of Ireland national under-17 football team, scoring in the 2005 Nordic Under-17 Football Championship win over England.

He also line up for the Republic of Ireland under-21, making his debut for the team, in a friendly match, against Germany U21. He appeared in the 2011 UEFA U–21 qualifiers. He scored his first goal in the seventh minute of a match against Estonia U21, on the virtue of which, the match ended in a draw. He went on to play a total of 10 times for the side, finding the net twice.

On 25 May 2010, Sheridan won his first cap for the Republic of Ireland in a 2–1 friendly win against Paraguay at the RDS Arena, as a 62nd-minute substitute for Robbie Keane. Three days later, he featured as a 72nd-minute substitute for Kevin Doyle as the Irish defeated Algeria 3–0 at the same ground. His final of three caps was his only start, playing 56 minutes of a 1–0 defeat to Argentina at the Aviva Stadium on 11 August before being withdrawn for Andy Keogh.

== Career statistics ==
As of match played 11 April 2026

Appearances and goals by club, season and competition
Club	Season	League			National cup (Note: Includes Scottish FA Cup, Bulgarian Cup, Cypriot Cup, Polish Cup & Israel State Cup)		League cup (Note: Includes Scottish League Cup, Toto Cup & Highland League Cup)		Continental		Other		Total	
Club	Season	Division	Apps	Goals	Apps	Goals	Apps	Goals	Apps	Goals	Apps	Goals	Apps	Goals
Celtic	2006–07	Scottish Premier League	1	0	1	0	0	0	0	0	0	0	2	0
Celtic	2007–08	Scottish Premier League	1	0	0	0	0	0	0	0	0	0	1	0
Celtic	2008–09	Scottish Premier League	12	4	0	0	1	0	3 (Note: Appearances in UEFA Champions League)	0	0	0	16	4
Celtic	Total		14	4	1	0	1	0	3	0	0	0	19	4
Motherwell (loan)	2008–09	Scottish Premier League	13	2	2	0	0	0	0	0	—		15	2
Plymouth Argyle (loan)	2009–10	Championship	13	0	1	0	0	0	—		—		14	0
St Johnstone (loan)	2009–10	Scottish Premier League	16	6	1	0	1	0	—		—		18	6
CSKA Sofia	2010–11	A PFG	16	4	3	2	—		7 (Note: Appearances in UEFA Europa League)	1	—		26	7
CSKA Sofia	2012–13	A PFG	3	0	0	0	—		1	0	—		4	0
CSKA Sofia	Total		19	4	3	2	—		8	1	—		30	7
St Johnstone (loan)	2011–12	Scottish Premier League	28	4	2	1	2	0	—		—		32	5
Kilmarnock	2012–13	Scottish Premier League	26	9	3	1	0	0	—		—		29	10
APOEL	2013–14	Cypriot First Division	26	5	7	4	—		5	0	1 (Note: Appearances in Cypriot Super Cup)	0	39	9
APOEL	2014–15	Cypriot First Division	20	3	5	1	—		10	3	1	0	36	7
APOEL	Total		46	8	12	5	—		15	3	2	0	75	16
Omonia Nicosia	2015–16	Cypriot First Division	31	15	6	1	—		5	3	0	0	42	19
Omonia Nicosia	2016–17	Cypriot First Division	23	8	3	1	—		4	1	0	0	30	10
Omonia Nicosia	Total		54	23	9	2	—		9	4	0	0	72	29
Jagiellonia Białystok	2016–17	Ekstraklasa	14	8	—		—		—		—		14	8
Jagiellonia Białystok	2017–18	Ekstraklasa	28	6	1	0	—		4	1	—		33	7
Jagiellonia Białystok	2018–19	Ekstraklasa	10	3	1	1	—		4	1	—		15	5
Jagiellonia Białystok	Total		52	17	2	1	—		8	2	—		62	20
Wellington Phoenix	2018–19	A-League	17	1	0	0	—		0	0	—		17	1
Ironi Kiryat Shmona	2019–20	Israeli Premier League	19	4	1	1	5	4	0	0			25	9
Wisła Płock	2019–20	Ekstraklasa	15	2	—		—		—		—		15	2
Wisła Płock	2020–21	Ekstraklasa	15	0	1	1	—		—		—		16	1
Wisła Płock	Total		30	2	1	1	—		—		—		31	3
Dundee	2021–22	Scottish Premiership	9	0	0	0	2	0	—		—		11	0
Dundee	2022–23	Scottish Championship	10	0	1	0	0	0	—		4 (Note: Appearances in the Scottish Challenge Cup)	1	15	1
Dundee	Total		19	0	1	0	2	0	0	0	4	1	26	1
Inverness Caledonian Thistle	2023–24	Scottish Championship	9	0	1	0	0	0	—		0	0	10	0
Queen's Park	2023–24	Scottish Championship	12	4	—		—		—		0	0	12	4
Brechin City	2024–25	Highland League	14	10	1	0	1	0	—		—		16	10
Brechin City	2025–26	Highland League	26	8	3	0	4	0	—		—		34	8
Brechin City	Total		40	18	4	0	5	0	0	0	0	0	50	18
Career total			427	106	43	13	16	4	43	10	6	1	537	135

== Honours ==
Republic of Ireland U17

- Nordic Under-17 Football Championship: 2005

CSKA Sofia

- Bulgarian Cup: 2010–11

APOEL

- Cypriot First Division: 2013–14, 2014–15
- Cypriot Cup: 2013–14, 2014–15
- Cypriot Super Cup: 2013

Dundee

- Scottish Championship: 2022–23

Individual

- Ekstraklasa Player of the Month: April 2017
