= Marco Esposito =

Italian footballer

Personal information
- Date of birth: 8 February 1980 (age 46)
- Place of birth: Massafra, Italy
- Height: 1.85 m (6 ft 1 in)
- Position: Central defender

Youth career
- 1996–1997: Milan
- 1997–1998: Monza

Senior career*
Years	Team	Apps	(Gls)
1998–2000	Meda	59	(4)
2000–2003	Cittadella	85	(1)
2003–2004	Ancona	12	(0)
2004–2005	Chievo	0	(0)
2005	→ Triestina (loan)	8	(0)
2005–2009	Bari	103	(2)
2009–2010	Mantova	7	(0)
2010	CSKA Sofia	3	(0)
2011	Portogruaro	13	(1)
2011–2012	Pisa	2	(0)

Managerial career
- 2018–2019: Monza (U19 assistant)
- * Club domestic league appearances and goals

Marco Esposito (born 8 February 1980) is an Italian former footballer.

== Club career ==
Esposito started his career at Meda of Serie D. He won promotion with the club and played a full Serie C2 season. In summer 2000, he joined Cittadella of Serie B. He followed the team relegated to Serie C1 in summer 2002. In July 2003 he joined Serie A side Ancona, which he made his Serie A debut on 23 November 2003 against Brescia. He then played for Chievo after Ancona relegated in summer 2004. In summer 2005, he signed for Bari which he played for 4 Serie B seasons. In July 2009, he left Bari for Mantova, signed a 3-year deal.

Esposito went on trial to Ekstraklasa side Wisła Kraków in July 2010. On 27 July 2010 it was confirmed that he had signed a two-year contract with CSKA Sofia.

In December 2010 he returned to Italy for Portogruaro.

On 10 August 2011 he was signed by Pisa.

On 26 June 2012 he was interrogation by the prosecutor. After a plea bargain, he was banned 3 months and 10 days for not reporting match-fixing activities.

== Honours ==
- Serie B winner: 2009
- Serie D winner: 1999
