= Matthew Williams (footballer) =

Welsh footballer

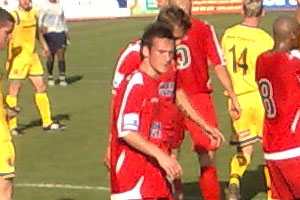

Personal information
- Full name: Matthew Williams
- Date of birth: 5 November 1982 (age 44)
- Place of birth: St Asaph, Wales
- Position: Striker

Senior career*
Years	Team	Apps	(Gls)
1999–2004	Manchester United	0	(0)
2004–2006	Notts County	26	(1)
2006	→ Tamworth (loan)	8	(5)
2006–2008	Tamworth	44	(10)
2008	→ Burton Albion (loan)	9	(3)
2008–2010	Rhyl	57	(29)
2010–2016	The New Saints	125	(49)
2016–2017	Connah's Quay Nomads	34	(8)
2017–2019	Llandudno		
2019–????	Newtown		
- * Club domestic league appearances and goals as of 15 February 2018

Matthew Williams (born 5 November 1982) is a Welsh footballer, who played as a striker.

== Playing career ==
=== Manchester United ===
Williams began his football career in 1999 with Manchester United. He signed for them at just 16 years of age and continued to play for a further 5 years. Despite playing well and scoring plenty of goals at reserve level, he was released in March 2005.

Although he failed to make an appearance in the first team, he did train with the first team regularly in his Manchester United career. Williams was involved in the reserve team that featured players such as Luke Chadwick, Paul McShane, Michael Stewart, Sylvan Ebanks-Blake, Kieran Richardson, Phil Bardsley, Giuseppe Rossi, Gerard Piqué, Richard Eckersley, Chris Eagles, Ritchie Jones and strike partner Colin Heath; who have all also left the club since Williams' departure.

=== Notts County ===
Williams joined Notts County on 11 March 2004, where he spent two seasons. Although it did not take him long to become a fixture in the first-team, he failed to make a major impact in the first-team.

In total, Williams made 26 appearances (13 starts and 13 substitute appearances) and scored just one goal.

=== Tamworth ===
Williams joined Tamworth on loan on 20 January 2006 for the remainder of the 2005–06 season, Williams made a total of eight appearances and scored five goals during the loan spell, before injury put an end to his season.

Despite an impressive time on loan at Tamworth, Williams was not offered a new contract by Notts County and was released.

Williams decided to re-sign with Tamworth on a one-year permanent contract for the 2006–07 season. During the season, he played as a winger and as a striker, and made a total of 31 appearances, scoring five goals.

Question marks had been raised over Williams' future following Tamworth's relegation from the Football Conference, although Matthew had always stated that despite the club's relegation, he wanted to sign another contract for the 2007–08 season.

On 2 July 2007, Williams and fellow striker Justin Jackson signed new one-year deals with Tamworth. On the same day, Williams was also joined at Tamworth by former Notts County teammates Robert Ullathorne and Jake Sheridan.

=== Burton Albion ===
Williams joined local rivals Burton Albion in a loan deal on 21 March 2008. He scored the winning goal away at Farsley Celtic on his debut, before netting in the defeat to Grays Athletic at home.

=== Rhyl ===
On 16 July 2008, Rhyl's website announced the signing of Williams just before kick off in a friendly against Oldham Athletic. Williams finished the 2009–10 season as the club's top scorer with 20 league goals.

=== The New Saints ===
In June 2010, Williams moved to reigning Welsh Premier League champions The New Saints. His first season with the club saw him score 24 goals in 38 appearances across all competitions. He signed a new contract with TNS in May 2012. Williams scored 2 goals in the 2015 Welsh Cup final against Newtown in Latham Park, Newtown. He also scored in the Champions League qualifiers against B36 Tórshavn and Videoton. After six years with the club he left in August 2016.

=== Connah's Quay Nomads ===
After leaving the Saints, Williams joined rival Welsh Premier side Connah's Quay Nomads.

He played for Llandudno before moving to Newtown in January 2019.
