= Martin Tsirkov =

Bulgarian footballer (born 1988)

Personal information
- Full name: Martin Iliyanov Tsirkov
- Date of birth: 29 December 1988 (age 37)
- Place of birth: Ruse, Bulgaria
- Height: 1.79 m (5 ft 10 1/2 in)
- Position: Right-back

Youth career
- Levski Ruse

Senior career*
Years	Team	Apps	(Gls)
2005	Dunav Ruse	6	(0)
2006–2007	Benkovski Byala	20	(1)
2007–2010	Dunav Ruse	39	(1)
2011	Sliven 2000	13	(0)
2012	Spartak Varna	20	(0)
2013–2015	Dunav Ruse	9	(0)

Managerial career
- 2020–2022: Dunav Ruse
- * Club domestic league appearances and goals as of 23 May 2014

Martin Tsirkov (Bulgarian: Мартин Цирков; born 29 December 1988) is a Bulgarian former footballer who played as a defender and now manager.

== Playing career ==
He started his career at the young teams of Dunav Ruse. He was in the team during 2005–2006 season where he debuted in 2nd division (also known as "B" PFG) at the age of 16. He played there until 2006–2007, when the notable coach Ferario Spasov loaned him to neighbor team Benkovski (Byala). Tsirkov played there until 2008. After that he came back to the team of his heart – Dunav. He played some memorable matches in the 2009–2010 season, where the team was near promotion to the "A" Professional football group. After Dunav was dissolved in 2010, he moved to Sliven, where he played 13 matches in the 1st division. He subsequently moved to Spartak(Varna), where he played about 25 games in "B" PFG and in January 2013 he came back to Dunav(Ruse) where he will help the team to promote again to 2nd division. He is known as a big fan of Dunav and the fans really like him and his hard style of playing.

== Managerial career ==
Tsirkov become manager of Dunav Ruse in December 2020. Under his management, the team returned in Second League. He was released from the club on 2 September 2022.
