= Michel Platini (Brazilian footballer) =

Brazilian footballer (born 1983)

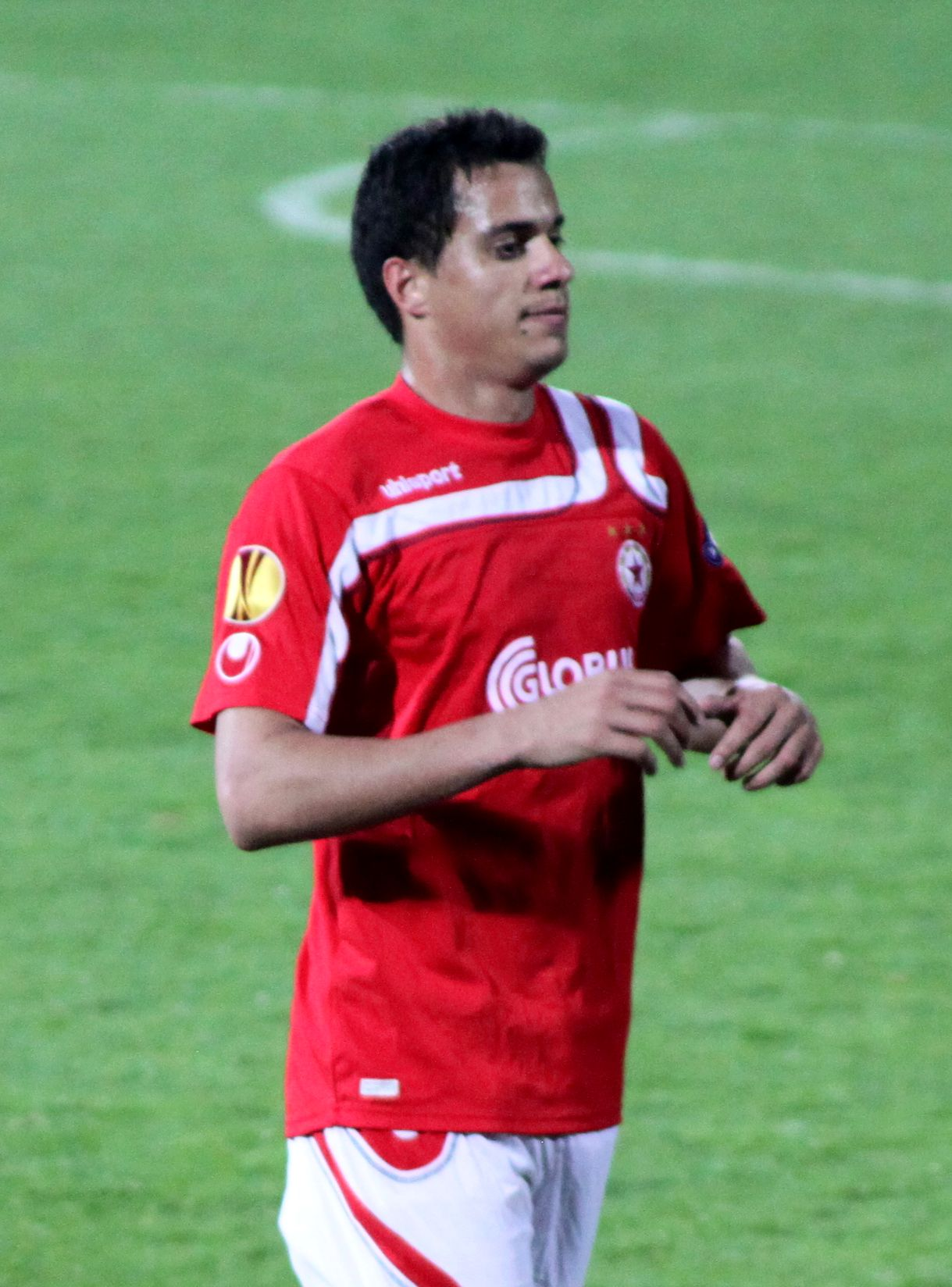
- Platini with CSKA Sofia in 2010

Personal information
- Full name: Michel Platini Ferreira Mesquita
- Date of birth: 8 September 1983 (age 43)
- Place of birth: Ceilândia, Brazil
- Height: 1.87 m (6 ft 2 in)
- Position: Forward

Senior career*
Years	Team	Apps	(Gls)
2002	Brazlândia		
2002–2003	Pachuca		
2004	Gama		
2005	Araguaína		
2006	Grêmio Anápolis		
2006	→South China (loan)	8	(0)
2007	Veranópolis		
2008	Araguaína		
2008–2009	Chernomorets Burgas	31	(13)
2009–2011	CSKA Sofia	47	(16)
2012	Dinamo București	8	(0)
2012–2013	CSKA Sofia	16	(8)
2013–2014	Ludogorets Razgrad	13	(3)
2014	Slavia Sofia	15	(5)
2015	Brasília	12	(4)
2016–2017	Anápolis	3	(3)
2017–2019	Brasiliense	16	(2)
2020	Gama	13	(5)
2021	Brasiliense	4	(1)
2022	Paranoá		
2022	Samambaia		
2023	Paranoá		
2023–2024	Gama		
- * Club domestic league appearances and goals as of 4 September 2021

Michel Platini Ferreira Mesquita or simply Michel Platini (born 8 September 1983) is a Brazilian professional footballer who plays as a forward.

== Career ==
Platini played for Brazlândia, Mexican Primera División side Pachuca, Gama, Araguaína, Grêmio Anápolis, Hong Kong First Division League side South China and Veranópolis, before moving to Chernomorets Burgas in Bulgaria.

=== Chernomorets Burgas ===
Platini signed a three-year contract with Chernomorets on 29 June 2008, after a successful trial period with the club. He marked his competitive debut on 5 July with the equalising goal in Chernomorets's second round match of Intertoto Cup against ND Gorica which ended in a 1–1 draw. Platini made his Bulgarian A Group debut against Botev Plovdiv in a 1–0 away win on 10 August. He scored his first league goal for Chernomorets on 21 September 2008 against Litex Lovech in a 2–2 away draw. During his first season, he scored 10 goals in 27 league games.

In May 2009 it was reported in the Bulgaria media that Michel was a target for Russian side Amkar Perm and Levski Sofia. Platini began the following season for Chernomorets, netting three goals in four league games.

=== CSKA Sofia ===
On 31 August 2009, CSKA Sofia signed Platini for a three-year deal keeping him in the club until 30 June 2012. He was given the number 22 shirt. Platini scored his first official goal for CSKA in the first match of the group stage of the UEFA Europa League against Fulham F.C. on 17 September 2009, which ended in a 1–1 draw.

On 26 February 2011, Platini scored two goals in the Eternal Derby against Levski Sofia, which ended in a 3–1 away win for CSKA. On 25 May, Platini won the Bulgarian Cup with CSKA.

On 17 October 2011, Platini signed a new contract with the club until the end of 2013–14 season.

=== Dinamo București ===
On 13 February 2012, Platini joined Dinamo București Ironically, he had played against them as a CSKA player in an ill-tempered friendly match just a week before, being sent off. However, he made only 8 appearances, struggling to establish himself in the squad.

=== Return to CSKA ===
On 12 July 2012, he returned to CSKA as part of the deal for Boris Galchev. He finished the season with 16 appearances, scoring 8 goals.

=== Ludogorets Razgrad ===
On 28 July 2013, CSKA shockingly announced that they have reached an agreement with title rivals and Bulgarian champions Ludogorets Razgrad for the transfer of Platini. On 30 June 2013, he was officially presented as a new signing in front of the media at the club's training camp in Austria. After some time in Ludogorets, Platini was usually a sub and later on, he was released by the club.

=== Slavia Sofia ===
After being released from Ludogorets Razgrad, Platini signed a contract with Slavia Sofia and made 8 appearances, scoring 3 goals. Later on in the winter pause he was released by Slavia Sofia and subsequently returned to Brazil. As of March 2015, Platini is the second highest foreign goalscorer in the A PFG of all time, having netted on 45 occasions.

== Career statistics ==
As of 11 May 2014

Club	Season	Division	League		Cup		Europe		Total	
Club	Season	Division	Apps	Goals	Apps	Goals	Apps	Goals	Apps	Goals
Chernomorets Burgas	2008–09	A Group	27	10	0	0	4	2	31	12
Chernomorets Burgas	2009–10	A Group	4	3	0	0	—		4	3
CSKA Sofia	2009–10	A Group	17	2	2	1	6	1	25	4
CSKA Sofia	2010–11	A Group	18	10	4	0	4	0	26	10
CSKA Sofia	2011–12	A Group	12	4	0	0	2	1	14	5
Dinamo București	2011–12	Liga I	8	0	1	0	0	0	9	0
CSKA Sofia	2012–13	A Group	16	8	1	1	0	0	16	8
Ludogorets Razgrad	2013–14	A Group	13	3	3	1	4	0	20	4
Slavia Sofia	2014–15	A Group	15	5	2	0	—		17	5
Total	Romania		8	0	1	0	0	0	9	0
Total	Bulgaria		109	42	10	3	20	4	139	49

== Honours ==
CSKA Sofia

- Bulgarian Cup: 2011
- Bulgarian Supercup: 2011

Ludogorets Razgrad

- Bulgarian A Group: 2013–14
- Bulgarian Cup: 2013–14
