= Milen Radukanov =

Bulgarian footballer (born 1972)

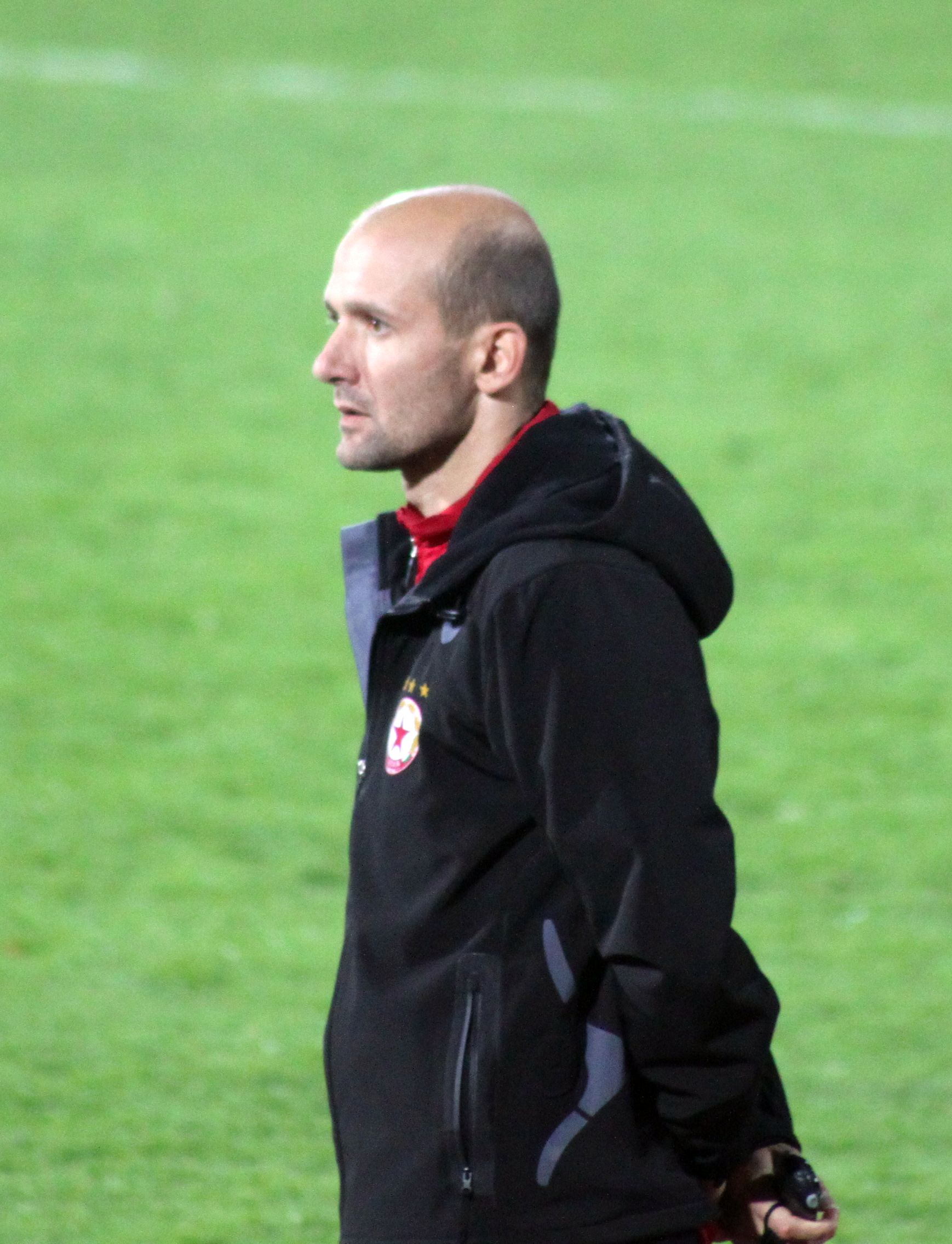

Personal information
- Full name: Milen Petrov Radukanov
- Date of birth: 12 December 1972 (age 53)
- Place of birth: Vidin, Bulgaria
- Height: 1.79 m (5 ft 10 in)
- Position: Defender

Senior career*
Years	Team	Apps	(Gls)
1991–1992	Bdin Vidin	22	(1)
1992–1996	CSKA Sofia	27	(0)
1993–1994	→ Pirin Blagoevgrad (loan)	24	(1)
1996–1997	Spartak Pleven	24	(2)
1997–1999	Levski Sofia	45	(2)
1999	Naţional București	16	(0)
2000–2003	Lokomotiv Sofia	76	(0)
2003–2004	Kastoria	18	(1)
2004–2005	Doxa Drama	21	(0)
2005–2006	Lokomotiv Sofia	9	(0)
2007	Rilski Sportist	10	(0)
2008	Nesebar	10	(0)
2008–2009	Levski Elin Pelin		

International career
1998	Bulgaria	1	(0)

Managerial career
- 2010–2011: CSKA Sofia
- 2011–2012: Botev Plovdiv
- 2013: CSKA Sofia
- 2013–2014: Slavia Sofia
- 2017–2018: Pirin Blagoevgrad
- 2019–2020: Septemvri Sofia
- * Club domestic league appearances and goals as of 12 March 2013

Milen Radukanov (Bulgarian: Милен Радуканов; born 12 December 1972) is a former Bulgarian footballer.

== Coaching career ==
=== CSKA Sofia ===
In 2010, Radukanov was appointed as CSKA Sofia's assistant coach and interpreter for the Romanian head coach Ioan Andone. Because of that fact he is known as the "Bulgarian Jose Mourinho". Later he joined the coaching staff of Adalbert Zafirov, Pavel Dochev and Gjore Jovanovski. On 21 October 2010, he became the temporary head coach of CSKA. The team showed impressive results under him, which led to his appointment as permanent head coach. His assistants were Todor Yanchev (the team's captain) and Svetoslav Petrov. When Radukanov took the helm, CSKA were 11th in the league table. He managed to take them to 3rd place by the end of the season and also won the Bulgarian Cup and Bulgarian Supercup that year. In October 2011, Radukanov vacated the position of head coach, citing mutual consent, just before the Eternal derby match.

=== Botev Plovdiv ===
On 28 October 2011, Bulgarian B PFG side Botev Plovdiv announced on their official website, that they had reached an agreement with Milen Radukanov to take over the manager position at the club. In April 2012, he vacated the position of head coach of Botev Plovdiv following a draw with Etar Veliko Tarnovo. Radukanov was reappointed as CSKA Sofia coach on 11 March 2013, after the club had parted ways with Miodrag Ješić. His second tenure at CSKA Sofia only lasted until the end of the season.

=== Slavia Sofia ===
He also managed Slavia Sofia between October 2013 and September 2014.

== Honours ==
=== Player ===
CSKA Sofia

- Bulgarian Cup: 1993

Levski Sofia

- Bulgarian Cup: 1998

=== Manager ===
CSKA Sofia

- Bulgarian Cup: 2010–11
- Bulgarian Supercup: 2011

== Managerial statistics ==
Team	From	To	APFG							
Team	From	To	G	W	D	L	F	A	Goal +/-	Win %
CSKA Sofia	21 October 2010	25 October 2011	30	23	4	3	63	20	+43	76.66
Botev Plovdiv	October 2011	March 2012	11	5	4	2	12	7	+5	54.55
CSKA Sofia	March 2013		14	10	2	2	25	9	+16	71.43
