= Nikolay Manchev =

Bulgarian footballer

Personal information
- Date of birth: 4 January 1985 (age 41)
- Place of birth: Plovdiv, Bulgaria
- Height: 1.78 m (5 ft 10 in)
- Position: Midfielder

Team information
- Current team: Bratsigovo

Youth career
- Maritsa Plovdiv

Senior career*
Years	Team	Apps	(Gls)
2006–2007	Maritsa Plovdiv	22	(6)
2007–2009	Botev Plovdiv	59	(6)
2009–2010	CSKA Sofia	10	(0)
2010–2012	Botev Plovdiv	27	(1)
2012–2013	Haskovo	?	(8)
2013–2014	Oborishte	27	(5)
2015–2016	Chiko Byaga	30	(11)
2016	Hebar Pazardzhik	12	(2)
2017	Svoboda Peshtera		
2017–	Bratsigovo		
- * Club domestic league appearances and goals as of 25 February 2015

Nikolay Manchev (Bulgarian Cyrillic: Николай Манчев; born 4 January 1985 in Plovdiv) is a Bulgarian footballer who plays as a midfielder for Bratsigovo.

== Career ==
Nikolay Manchev started his career in his home town of Plovdiv, with local team Maritsa. In June 2007, he joined Botev Plovdiv. He had a contract with Botev to 30 June 2010. Manchev made his official debut with Botev in a match against Spartak Varna on 11 August 2007. He played for 90 minutes. The result of the match was 2-2. On 24 November 2007, he scored his first goal for Botev against Vihren Sandanski. He netted in the 63rd minute. The result of the match was 1–0. He joined CSKA Sofia as a free agent with his teammate Todor Timonov on 15 July 2009. He terminated his contract with CSKA by mutual consent in October 2010 and returned to Botev Plovdiv.

In July 2017, Manchev joined Bratsigovo in A RFG Pazardzhik.
