= Christian Tiboni =

Italian footballer (born 1988)

Personal information
- Date of birth: 6 April 1988 (age 38)
- Place of birth: Bergamo, Italy
- Height: 1.89 m (6 ft 2 in)
- Position: Striker

Team information
- Current team: Unione Sportiva Mola

Youth career
- –2006: Atalanta
- 2006–2007: Udinese

Senior career*
Years	Team	Apps	(Gls)
2006	Atalanta	1	(0)
2007–2008	Udinese	3	(0)
2007	→ Pisa (loan)	0	(0)
2008	→ Sassuolo (loan)	10	(1)
2008–2011	Atalanta	1	(0)
2008–2009	→ Verona (loan)	24	(8)
2010	→ Ascoli (loan)	9	(1)
2010	→ CSKA Sofia (loan)	4	(0)
2011	→ Hellas Verona (loan)	3	(0)
2011	Foggia	10	(1)
2012	→ Monza (loan)	12	(3)
2012–2014	Prato	40	(8)
2014	Pergolettese	8	(1)
2014	Padova	5	(1)
2014–2015	Piacenza	15	(2)
2015–2016	Reggina	25	(5)
2016–2017	Agropoli	27	(5)
2017	SC Palazzolo	11	(1)
2017–	San Nicolò Calcio	0	(0)

International career
2003–2004	Italy U-16	6	(4)
2004–2005	Italy U-17	3	(2)
2004–2005	Italy U-18	2	(0)
2005–2006	Italy U-19	5	(0)
2006–2008	Italy U-20	2	(0)
- * Club domestic league appearances and goals as of 6 December 2017

Christian Tiboni (born 6 April 1988) is an Italian footballer who plays as a striker for S.S.D. San Nicolò Calcio.

== Club career ==
Christian began his career at Atalanta as a youth player. Christian made one Serie B appearance for Atalanta during the 2005–2006 season, and his potential later persuaded Udinese to buy half of his contractual rights for the start of the 2006–2007 season. and exchanged with Fernando Tissone. His national youth team striking partner Salvatore Foti was also signed. He was successively loaned out to Pisa during the summer of 2007 transfer window, but failed to make a single appearance with the Tuscan side, being then loaned to Serie C1 team Sassuolo in January 2008. In June 2008 Atalanta re-signed him from Udinese and loaned him to Hellas Verona.

Tiboni went on trial to Ekstraklasa side Wisła Kraków in July 2010. Later he signed one-year loan contract + the option for another two for the Bulgarian side CSKA Sofia on 29 July 2010, becoming the fourth Italian player they signed that summer.

In mid-2017, Tiboni joined Serie D club S.C. Palazzolo. The contract was terminated in November 2017.

== International career ==
On 12 August 2009 he was called up to the Italy U-21 national team for a friendly game against Russia. But he didn't play in this match.

== Career statistics ==
=== Club ===
(Correct as of 20 September 2010)

Club	Season	League			Cup			Europe			Total		
Club	Season	Apps	Goals	Assists	Apps	Goals	Assists	Apps	Goals	Assists	Apps	Goals	Assists
CSKA Sofia	2010–11	4	0	0	0	0	0	1	1	0	5	1	0
CSKA Sofia	Total	4	0	0	0	0	0	1	1	0	5	1	0
