= Nikola Radulović (footballer) =

Serbian footballer

Personal information
- Full name: Nikola Radule Radulović
- Date of birth: 25 February 1993 (age 33)
- Place of birth: Belgrade, FR Yugoslavia
- Height: 1.86 m (6 ft 1 in)
- Positions: Attacking midfielder; forward

Youth career
- –2010: Radnički Pirot
- 2010: CSKA Sofia

Senior career*
Years	Team	Apps	(Gls)
2010–2012	CSKA Sofia	0	(0)
2011	→ Akademik Sofia (loan)	17	(2)
2012–2014	Jagodina	0	(0)
2014	Spartak Varna	11	(1)
2015–2016	Septemvri Simitli	27	(0)
2016–2020	Värmdö IF	64	(7)
2020	Järla IF	10	(0)
2021–2023	Sickla IF	46	(23)
2024	Henriksdalsberget FF	7	(1)
- * Club domestic league appearances and goals as of 21:55, 13 December 2024 (UTC)

Nikola Radulović (born 25 February 1993) is a Serbian footballer who plays as an attacking midfielder or forward.

== Career ==
Radulović began his football career for Radnički Pirot. He joined the CSKA Sofia Academy in January 2010 and signed his first professional contract with the club on 28 February 2011.

A two days later, CSKA agreed for Radulović to spend a three month loan spell at Akademik Sofia. He made his debut on 19 March at the Hadzhi Dimitar Stadium in a 0–3 defeat to Sliven 2000, coming on as a substitute for Ivan Redovski. Nikola scored his first competitive goal for Akademik in a 1–1 draw against Bdin on 17 September 2011.

== Career statistics ==
As of 4 January 2016

Club	Season	Division	League		Cup		Europe		Total	
Club	Season	Division	Apps	Goals	Apps	Goals	Apps	Goals	Apps	Goals
CSKA Sofia	2010–11	A Group	0	0	0	0	0	0	0	0
CSKA Sofia	Total		0	0	0	0	0	0	0	0
Akademik Sofia	2010–11	A Group	5	0	0	0	—		5	0
Akademik Sofia	2011–12	B Group	12	2	1	0	—		12	2
Akademik Sofia	Total		17	2	1	0	0	0	18	2
Spartak Varna	2014–15	B Group	11	1	1	0	—		12	1
Spartak Varna	Total		11	0	1	0	0	0	12	1
Septemvri Simitli	2014–15	B Group	12	0	0	0	—		12	0
Septemvri Simitli	2015–16	B Group	15	0	1	0	—		16	0
Septemvri Simitli	Total		27	0	1	0	0	0	28	0
Career total			55	3	3	0	0	0	58	3
