= Borislav Iliev =

Bulgarian footballer

Personal information
- Full name: Borislav Georgiev Iliev
- Date of birth: 18 February 1988 (age 38)
- Place of birth: Sandanski, Bulgaria
- Height: 1.83 m (6 ft 0 in)
- Position: Right back

Senior career*
Years	Team	Apps	(Gls)
2006–2009	Dunav Ruse	33	(4)
2009–2012	Sportist Svoge	58	(2)
- * Club domestic league appearances and goals

Borislav Iliev (Bulgarian: Борислав Илиев; born February 18, 1988) is a Bulgarian retired footballer who played as a defender. He had played for Dunav Ruse.
