= Martin Kushev =

Bulgarian footballer and manager

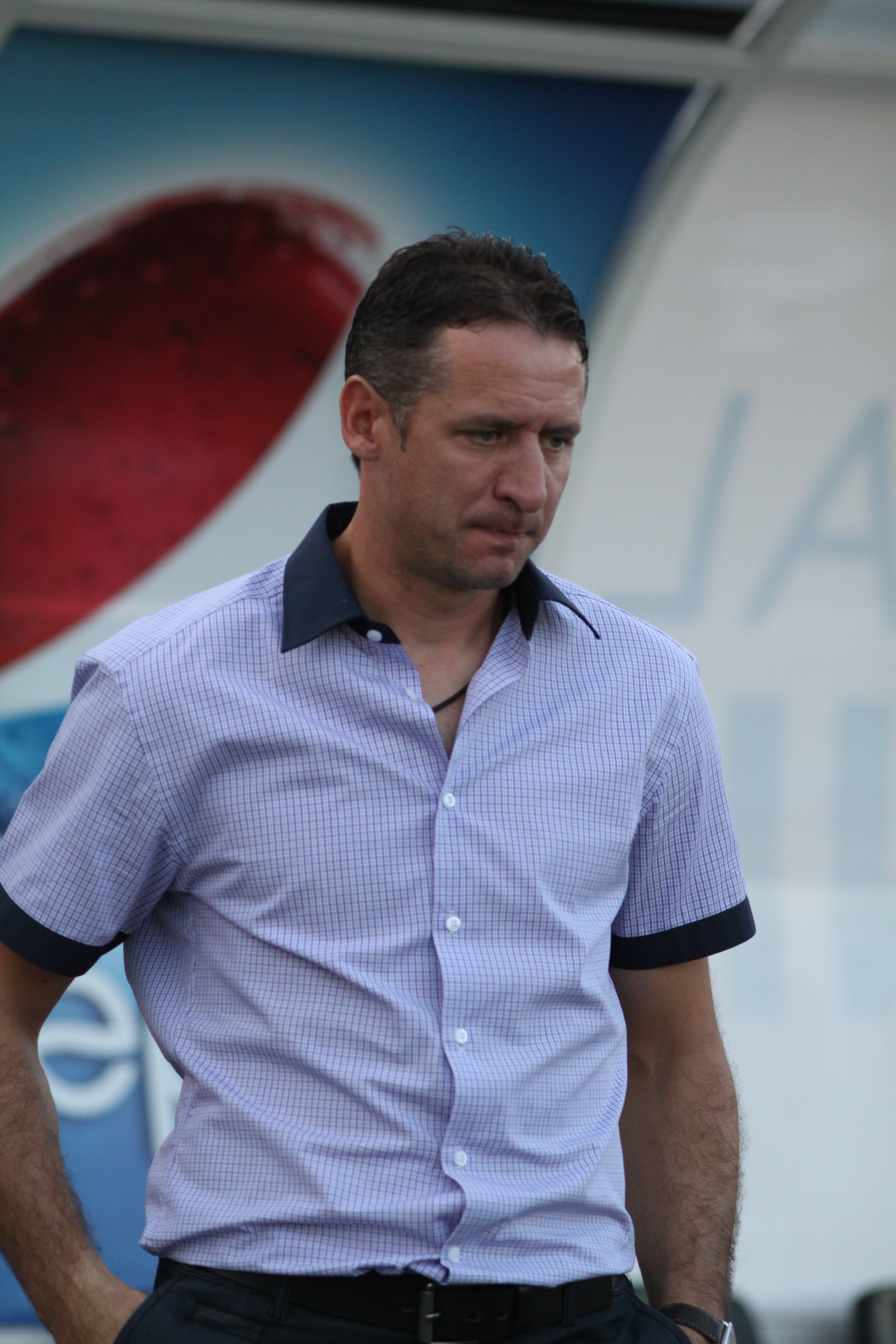

Personal information
- Full name: Martin Miroslavov Kushev
- Date of birth: 25 August 1973 (age 53)
- Place of birth: Troyan, Bulgaria
- Height: 1.88 m (6 ft 2 in)
- Position: Forward

Team information
- Current team: Slavia Sofia (assistant)

Youth career
- 1982–1990: Chavdar Troyan

Senior career*
Years	Team	Apps	(Gls)
1991–1996	Yantra Gabrovo	54	(15)
1991–1992	→ Loko Dryanovo (loan)	16	(4)
1996–1997	Spartak Varna	29	(6)
1997–1999	Slavia Sofia	62	(18)
2000	Saarbrücken	16	(2)
2000–2001	Slavia Sofia	34	(18)
2001–2002	Levski Sofia	15	(6)
2002	Slavia Sofia	13	(17)
2003–2004	Shinnik Yaroslavl	40	(10)
2005	Litex Lovech	14	(2)
2005–2010	Amkar Perm	134	(35)
2011	Slavia Sofia	7	(0)
2015–2016	Balkan Botevgrad	?	(?)

International career
2007	Bulgaria	1	(0)

Managerial career
- 2011–2012: Slavia Sofia
- 2016–2020: Slavia Sofia (assistant)
- 2020–: Slavia Sofia (assistant)
- * Club domestic league appearances and goals

Martin Miroslavov Kushev (Bulgarian: Мартин Мирославов Кушев, born 25 August 1973 in Troyan) is a Bulgarian football manager and former player who is currently an assistant coach at Slavia Sofia.

During his football career, Kushev has often been described as an old fashioned English-style centre forward due to his physical presence and outstanding aerial ability.

== Career ==
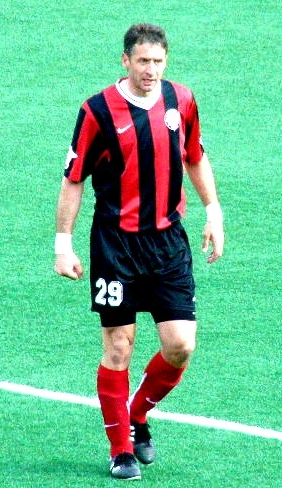
Kushev playing for Amkar

Kushev started his playing career at Yantra Gabrovo. After one season on loan to Lokomotiv Dryanovo, he made his debut for Yantra in A PFG during the 1992–93 season.

In 1996 Kushev was spotted by Spartak Varna, where he scored 6 league goals in his first season and transferred to Slavia Sofia. He spent three periods with Slavia Sofia (1997–99, 2000–01 and 2002) and played also for German Saarbrücken and Levski Sofia. With Levski Kushev has won one A PFG title and one Bulgarian Cup.

In January 2003 he was signed by Russian Shinnik Yaroslavl, where scored 10 goals for two years in the Russian Premier League.

After a half season at Litex Lovech, Kushev returned to Russia, signing with Amkar Perm. He marked his debut with a goal in a 3–2 victory over Saturn on 24 July 2005. In 2008, he took over the captaincy of Amkar, a responsibility he held until leaving the club in December 2010. He played his last match for Amkar on 28 November 2010 in a 0–0 home draw against CSKA Moscow. Martin spent 6 seasons of his career at the club of Perm, playing in 134 games. With his 35 goals Kushev is the third highest scorer at Amkar in the Russian Premier League.

On 28 January 2011, Kushev returned to Bulgaria and signed for Slavia Sofia on a 5-month contract. His last official game in his career was against CSKA Sofia in the 2011 Bulgarian Cup Final, which Slavia lost 1–0. On 28 May 2011, Kushev retired from active football. On 31 July 2011, Kushev played his farewell game for Slavia, appearing for 10 minutes in the 2:2 draw with Cypriot side Apollon Limassol in an exhibition match. In the summer of 2011, he was appointed as head coach of Slavia Sofia.

== International career ==
On 12 September 2007, at the age of 34 years, Kushev made his debut for the Bulgarian national team. He played his first and last match for Bulgaria in a 3–0 home win against Luxembourg, coming on as a second-half substitute for Ivelin Popov.

== Honours ==
- Levski Sofia
  - Bulgarian A PFG: 2001–02
  - Bulgarian Cup: 2002
- Saarbrücken
  - Saarland Cup winners: 1999, 2000
