= Samet Ashimov =

Bulgarian footballer

Personal information
- Date of birth: 16 May 1979 (age 47)
- Place of birth: Sevlievo, Bulgaria
- Height: 1.80 m (5 ft 11 in)
- Position: Defender

Youth career
- Vidima-Rakovski

Senior career*
Years	Team	Apps	(Gls)
1998–2001	Vidima-Rakovski	?	(?)
2001	CSKA Sofia	4	(1)
2002–2003	Lokomotiv Sofia	33	(0)
2003–2007	Vidima-Rakovski	73	(1)
2007–2010	Minyor Pernik	49	(2)
2010–2012	Vidima-Rakovski	39	(1)
2012–2013	Strumska Slava	?	(?)
2014	Vitosha Bistritsa	5	(0)
2014–2015	Strumska Slava	?	(?)
2017	Strumska Slava	1	(0)

International career
- Bulgaria U21
- * Club domestic league appearances and goals as of 15 September 2017

Samet Ashimov (Bulgarian: Самет Ашимов; born 16 May 1979) is a Bulgarian former footballer.

He was raised in Vidima-Rakovski's youth academy. Ashimov is a former member of the Bulgaria U21 national side. He has two children - a daughter and a son.

Ashimov retired from football in 2015 but made a surprising return, joining his last club Strumska Slava Radomir in September 2017. He made a single appearance for the club in the Second League and was released in December.
