= Lucas Trecarichi =

Argentine footballer (born 1991)

Personal information
- Full name: Lucas Ezequiel Trecarichi Loiácono
- Date of birth: 12 February 1991 (age 35)
- Place of birth: Béccar, Argentina
- Height: 1.69 m (5 ft 7 in)
- Position: Winger

Youth career
- 2003–2004: River Plate
- 2005–2007: Leganés
- 2007–2008: Sevilla

Senior career*
Years	Team	Apps	(Gls)
2008–2010	Sevilla B	9	(0)
2009	→ Huracán (loan)	11	(1)
2010	→ Ponferradina (loan)	6	(0)
2010–2011	CSKA Sofia	5	(0)
2012–2013	Unión San Felipe	0	(0)
2012	Unión San Felipe B	4	(3)
2013	Kallithea	18	(1)
2014	Jūrmala	7	(1)
2015	Deportivo Petapa	10	(1)
2016	San Martín Burzaco	23	(7)
2017–2018	Sportivo Barracas	19	(3)
2018	Rotonda	6	(1)

International career
2009	Argentina U20	2	(1)
- * Club domestic league appearances and goals

Lucas Ezequiel Trecarichi Loiácono (Spanish pronunciation: [ˈlukas tɾekaˈɾitʃi]; born 12 February 1991) is an Argentine former footballer who played mainly as a left winger.

== Club career ==
=== Early years / Sevilla ===
Born in Béccar, Buenos Aires Province, Trecarichi began his career at Club Atlético River Plate, being released in December 2004. In January of the following year, one month before his 14th birthday, he joined CD Leganés, moving to Spain with his parents and soon attracting interest from several clubs in Europe, which prompted the Madrid side to sign him to a five-year contract with a €3 million clause; he often trained with the main squad, but played only with the B-team.

In 2007, the youngster signed for Sevilla FC – as Arsenal was also interested– playing two seasons with the reserves in the second division with little success. Subsequently, Trecarichi was loaned to Club Atlético Huracán for six months, making his top flight debut on 3 September 2009 by coming on as a substitute in a 0–2 loss against Atlético Tucumán; on 7 October he scored his first and only goal for them, in a 2–2 draw at Club Atlético Tigre.

On 24 August 2010, after another spell in Spain, playing four months with lowly SD Ponferradina, Trecarichi moved teams and countries again, joining PFC CSKA Sofia of Bulgaria on a three-year contract. In the summer of 2011, however, he was released by the latter club.

=== Unión San Felipe / Kallithea ===
On 16 February 2012, Trecarichi signed with Chilean Primera División side Unión San Felipe as a free agent. He made appearances for the B-team in the Segunda División Profesional.

He spent the 2013–14 season in Greece with Kallithea FC, being relatively played as his team finished in eighth position in the second tier.

=== FC Jūrmala ===
Prior to the 2014 campaign, Trecarichi joined FC Jūrmala. He scored his first and only league goal on 12 April, in a 4–2 victory over FS METTA/Latvijas Universitāte.

== International career ==
Trecarichi represented Argentina at under-17 and under-20 levels, appearing for the later at the 2009 Toulon Tournament.
