= Chetin Sadula =

Bulgarian footballer

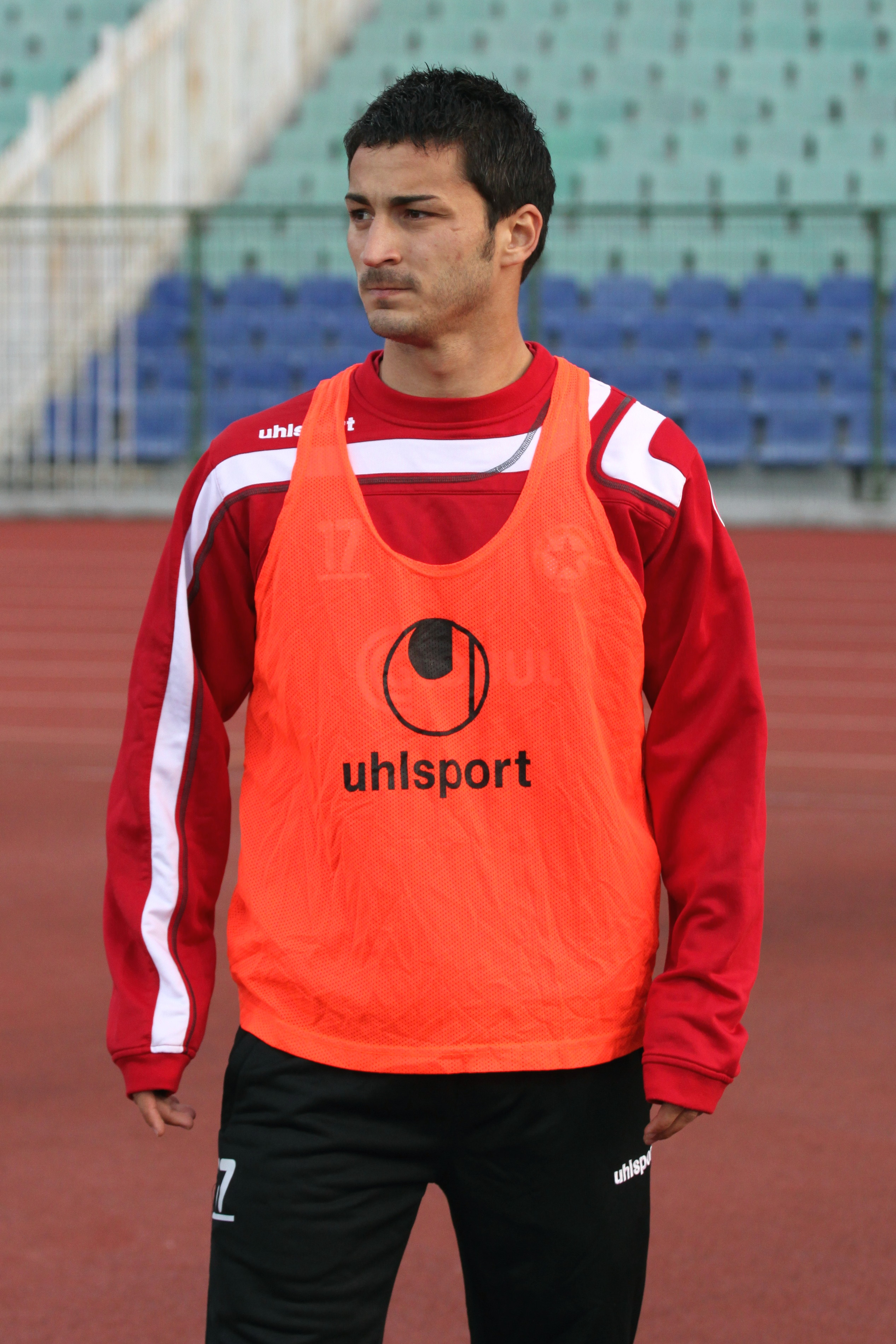

Personal information
- Full name: Chetin Muharem Sadula
- Date of birth: 16 June 1987 (age 39)
- Place of birth: Sofia, Bulgaria
- Height: 1.70 m (5 ft 7 in)
- Position: Midfielder

Team information
- Current team: Vitosha Bistritsa

Senior career*
Years	Team	Apps	(Gls)
2005–2008	Levski Sofia	1	(0)
2006	→ Rodopa (loan)	8	(0)
2007	→ Dunav Ruse (loan)	12	(2)
2007–2008	→ Svilengrad (loan)	24	(5)
2008–2010	Kaliakra Kavarna	66	(7)
2011–2012	CSKA Sofia	6	(0)
2011–2012	→ Kaliakra (loan)	26	(3)
2012	Etar 1924	14	(1)
2013	Lokomotiv Plovdiv	12	(1)
2013–2020	Vitosha Bistritsa	193	(27)
2020–2022	Minyor Pernik	47	(0)
2022–	Vitosha Bistritsa	0	(0)
- * Club domestic league appearances and goals as of 07:54, 5 July 2022 (UTC)

Chetin Muharem Sadula (Bulgarian: Четин Мухарем Садула, Turkish: Çetin Sadullah; born 16 June 1987) is a Bulgarian footballer who plays as a midfielder for Vitosha Bistritsa. He is a right midfielder who plays in the holding midfield role or as an attacking midfielder.

== Career ==
A product of Bulgarian giants Levski Sofia's youth system, Sadula played only a one game for the side, serving consecutive loans in Rodopa Smolyan, Dunav Ruse, and Svilengrad 1921. He played his first and last match for Levski during the 2005–06 season on 31 May 2006 in a 1–2 away loss against Belasitsa Petrich, coming on as a substitute for Nikolay Dimitrov.

=== Kaliakra Kavarna ===
In June 2008, his contract was mutually terminated and Sadula joined Kaliakra Kavarna. At Kaliakra, he became a regular starter of the team, as a right side midfielder and a right winger. Sadula made his Kaliakra début on 10 August 2008 in the home game versus Chernomorets Balchik. He scored his first goal for the team in the match against Svilengrad 1921 on 20 September 2008. His second season with Kaliakra has been a much improved one. In 2009–10, Sadula earned 27 appearances in the Bulgarian B PFG, scoring four goals. In the Bulgarian Cup, he played four matches.

=== CSKA Sofia ===
In January 2011, he attracted the interest of the team of PFC CSKA Sofia.

== Career statistics ==
=== Club ===
As of 25 April 2019

Club	Season	League		Cup		Europe		Total	
Club	Season	Apps	Goals	Apps	Goals	Apps	Goals	Apps	Goals
Levski Sofia	2005–06	1	0	0	0	0	0	1	0
Rodopa Smolyan	2006–07	8	0	1	0	–	–	9	0
Dunav Ruse	2006–07	12	2	0	0	–	–	12	2
Svilengrad 1921	2007–08	24	5	1	0	–	–	25	5
Kaliakra Kavarna	2008–09	24	1	0	0	–	–	24	1
Kaliakra Kavarna	2009–10	27	4	4	0	–	–	31	4
Kaliakra Kavarna	2010–11	15	2	1	0	–	–	16	2
CSKA Sofia	2010–11	6	0	0	0	0	0	6	0
Kaliakra Kavarna	2011–12	26	3	1	0	–	–	27	3
Etar 1924	2012–13	14	1	0	0	–	–	14	1
Lokomotiv Plovdiv	2012–13	12	1	0	0	–	–	12	1
Vitosha Bistritsa	2013–14	26	6	4	3	–	–	30	9
Vitosha Bistritsa	2014–15	25	5	0	0	–	–	25	5
Vitosha Bistritsa	2015–16	27	8	0	0	–	–	27	8
Vitosha Bistritsa	2016–17	27	2	1	0	–	–	28	2
Vitosha Bistritsa	2017–18	25	0	0	0	–	–	25	0
Vitosha Bistritsa	2018–19	32	4	1	0	–	–	33	4
Career total		331	44	14	3	0	0	345	47
