= Giuseppe Aquaro =

Swiss footballer (born 1983)

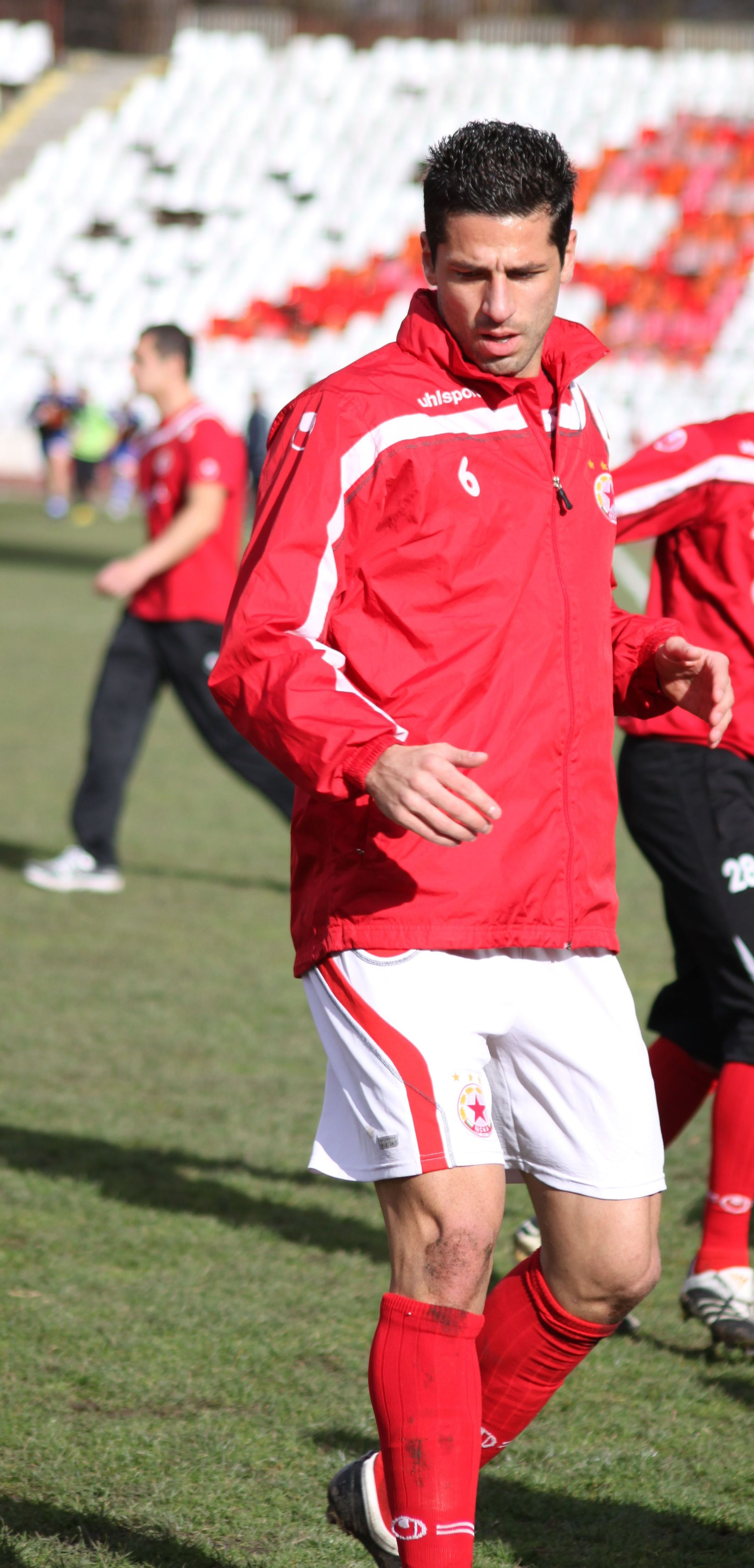

Personal information
- Date of birth: 21 May 1983 (age 43)
- Place of birth: Baden, Switzerland
- Height: 1.87 m (6 ft 2 in)
- Position: Centre back

Senior career*
Years	Team	Apps	(Gls)
2002–2003	Foggia	1	(0)
2003–2004	Melfi	1	(0)
2004–2005	Chievo	0	(0)
2005–2007	Bellinzona	55	(4)
2007–2008	Vaduz	24	(1)
2008–2010	Aarau	44	(4)
2010–2011	CSKA Sofia	19	(3)
2011–2012	Karlsruher SC	23	(2)
2012–2014	Panetolikos	16	(1)
2014–2015	Shenzhen Ruby	38	(1)
2015–2016	Racing Roma	28	(0)
2016–2018	Triestina	43	(3)
2018–2019	Nardò	41	(3)
2020–2021	Chiasso	5	(0)
2021–2022	Sava		
- * Club domestic league appearances and goals

Giuseppe Aquaro (born 21 May 1983) is a Swiss former football defender.

== Career ==
=== Club career ===
Aquaro played in Italy for Foggia Calcio and A.S. Melfi, before signing with Swiss side AC Bellinzona in 2005. He signed a contract with leading Bulgarian club CSKA Sofia in the summer of 2010.

In February 2014, Aquaro was transferred to China League One side Shenzhen Ruby.
