= Stanko Yovchev =

Bulgarian footballer

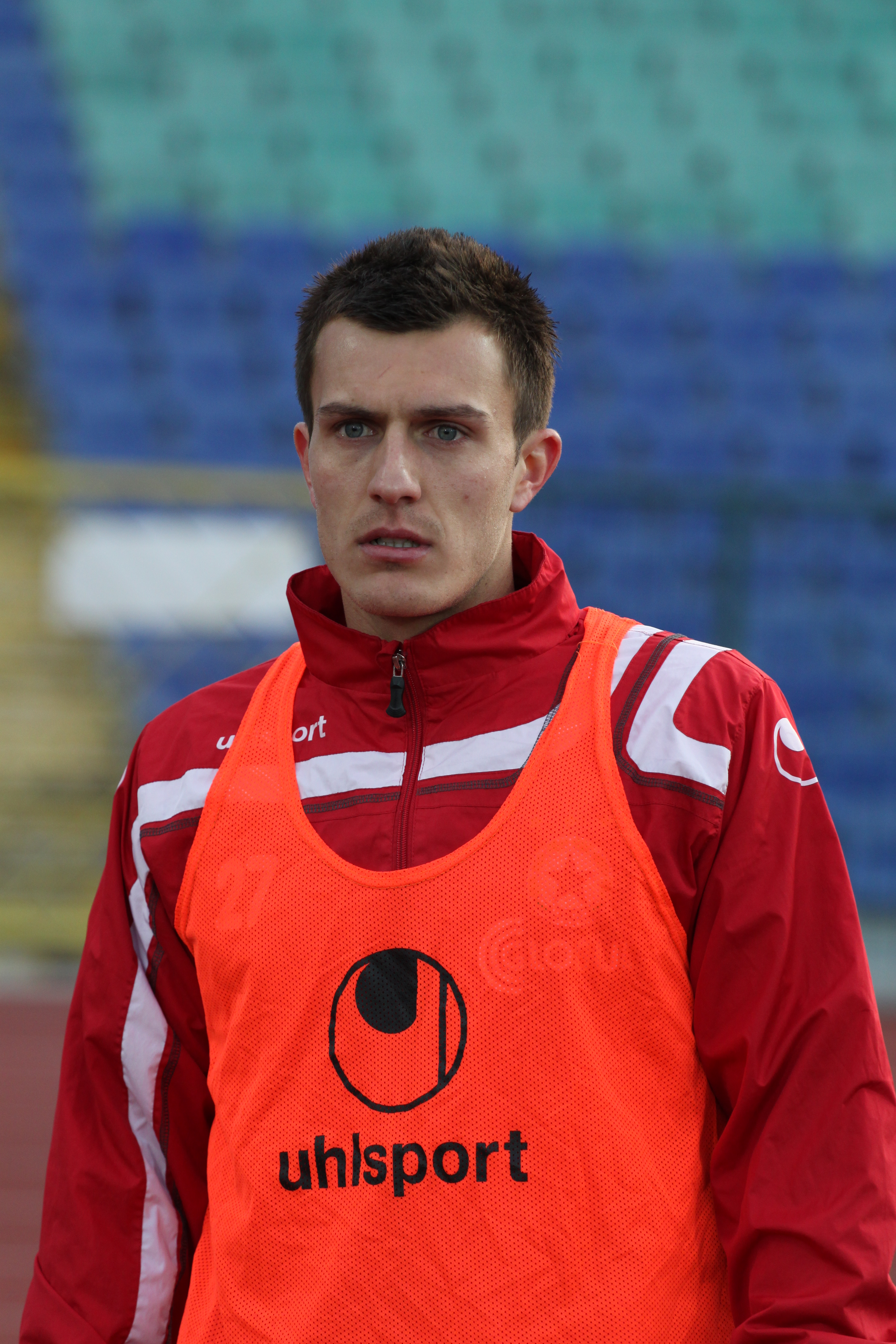

Personal information
- Full name: Stanko Georgiev Yovchev
- Date of birth: 15 April 1988 (age 38)
- Place of birth: Sandanski, Bulgaria
- Height: 1.80 m (5 ft 11 in)
- Positions: Winger; forward

Senior career*
Years	Team	Apps	(Gls)
2007–2008	CSKA Sofia	6	(0)
2007–2008	→ Rilski Sportist (loan)	8	(2)
2008–2009	Rilski Sportist	25	(9)
2009–2010	Bdin Vidin	21	(15)
2010–2011	Pontioi Katerini	28	(13)
2011–2013	CSKA Sofia	13	(2)
2013–2014	Lokomotiv Plovdiv	6	(0)
- * Club domestic league appearances and goals as of 19 May 2014

Stanko Georgiev Yovchev (Bulgarian: Станко Георгиев Йовчев; born 15 April 1988) is a Bulgarian footballer, who plays as a forward.

== Career ==
He started his career in the local academy. In 2002 he was transferred to CSKA's academy where the coach was Alexander Yordanov and the academy was headed by Ivaylo Kotev. From 2007 he was starring in CSKA's official matches and his first official debut for CSKA took place against Lokomotiv Sofia. During that time CSKA's coach was Stoycho Mladenov. In 2011 he played in many official CSKA matches and friendlies. In January 2012 he was part of the team led by Dimitar Penev who won a tournament in Libya. He is a Lokomotiv Plovdiv player since the summer of 2013.
