= Tom Mansharov =

Israeli footballer

Tom Mansharov תום מנשרוב
Personal information
- Full name: Tom Mansharov
- Date of birth: 15 April 1987 (age 39)
- Place of birth: Tel Aviv, Israel
- Height: 1.80 m (5 ft 11 in)
- Position: Defensive midfielder

Senior career*
Years	Team	Apps	(Gls)
2006–2010	Maccabi Tel Aviv	1	(0)
2006–2007	→ Hapoel Petah Tikva (loan)	9	(0)
2007–2008	→ Ironi Ramat HaSharon (loan)	26	(1)
2010	→ Ironi Ramat HaSharon (loan)	8	(0)
2010–2011	Slavia Sofia	14	(0)
2011–2012	Maccabi Tel Aviv	2	(0)
2012–2015	Ironi Ramat HaSharon	57	(1)

International career
2003–2004	Israel U-17	14	(1)
2005	Israel U-18	5	(0)
2005–2006	Israel U-19	15	(1)
2007	Israel U-21	2	(0)
- * Club domestic league appearances and goals

Tom Mansharov (Hebrew: תום מנשרוב; born 15 April 1987 in Tel Aviv) is an Israeli footballer who last played for Ironi Ramat HaSharon in the Israeli Premier League. Born in Tel Aviv, Mansharov is of Bulgarian descent.
