= 2011–12 PFC CSKA Sofia season =

CSKA Sofia
2011–12 season
- Chairman: Dimitar Borisov
- Manager: Milen Radukanov (until October 23); Dimitar Penev (until March 5); Stoycho Mladenov (from March 5)
- A Group: Second place
- Bulgarian Cup: Quarterfinals
- Bulgarian Supercup: Winner
- UEFA Europa League: Playoff round
Home colours	Away colours

The 2011–12 season was PFC CSKA Sofia's 64th consecutive season in A Group. This article shows player statistics and all matches (official and friendly) that the club will play during the 2011–12 season.

== Players ==
=== Squad stats ===
Appearances for competitive matches only

No.	Pos	Nat	Player	Total		A Group		Bulgarian Cup Bulgarian Supercup		Europa League	
No.	Pos	Nat	Player	Apps	Goals	Apps	Goals	Apps	Goals	Apps	Goals
1	GK	(Bulgaria) BUL	Zdravko Chavdarov	0	0	0	0	0	0	0	0
3	DF	(Brazil) BRA	Ademar	24	0	16+3	0	2+1	0	2	0
5	MF	(Bulgaria) BUL	Todor Yanchev	29	2	24	2	3	0	2	0
6	DF	(Bulgaria) BUL	Kostadin Stoyanov	19	1	15	0	2	1	2	0
7	MF	(Spain) ESP	Antonio Tomás	10	0	3+7	0	0	0	0	0
8	DF	(Bulgaria) BUL	Rumen Trifonov	19	0	12+4	0	2	0	1	0
9	FW	(Equatorial Guinea) GEQ	Iván Bolado	1	0	1	0	0	0	0	0
10	FW	(Brazil) BRA	Júnior Moraes	26	17	23+1	16	1+1	1	0	0
11	DF	(Bulgaria) BUL	Ivan Bandalovski	31	1	26	1	3	0	2	0
14	FW	(Bulgaria) BUL	Stanislav Kostov	23	2	5+13	2	1+3	0	0+1	0
15	FW	(Bulgaria) BUL	Stanko Yovchev	4	0	0+3	0	0+1	0	0	0
16	MF	(Bulgaria) BUL	Aleksandar Yakimov	15	0	0+13	0	0+2	0	0	0
17	FW	(Madagascar) MAD	Anicet Andrianantenaina	0	0	0	0	0	0	0	0
18	MF	(Bulgaria) BUL	Boris Galchev	34	3	29	2	3	1	2	0
19	DF	(Bulgaria) BUL	Apostol Popov	7	0	5+1	0	1	0	0	0
21	MF	(Bulgaria) BUL	Kosta Yanev	6	0	2+4	0	0	0	0	0
22	MF	(Bulgaria) BUL	Petar Stoyanov	18	1	12+3	1	3	0	0	0
23	DF	(Bulgaria) BUL	Martin Dechev	6	0	1+2	0	2	0	0+1	0
24	DF	(Netherlands) NED	Ilias Haddad	3	0	0+3	0	0	0	0	0
25	DF	(Bulgaria) BUL	Angel Granchov	16	1	15	1	1	0	0	0
26	MF	(Bulgaria) BUL	Nikolay Dyulgerov	13	0	9+3	0	1	0	0	0
27	MF	(Bulgaria) BUL	Kristiyan Petrov	1	0	0+1	0	0	0	0	0
31	MF	(Bulgaria) BUL	Vladimir Ivanov	3	0	0+2	0	0+1	0	0	0
32	FW	(Romania) ROU	Georgian Păun	10	2	6+3	2	1	0	0	0
66	DF	(Bulgaria) BUL	Plamen Krachunov	27	3	24+1	2	2	1	0	0
71	MF	(Bulgaria) BUL	Anton Karachanakov	16	4	10+3	4	3	0	0	0
88	GK	(Bulgaria) BUL	Blagoy Makendzhiev	2	0	0+1	0	1	0	0	0
92	GK	(Algeria) ALG	Raïs M'Bolhi	32	0	28	0	2	0	2	0
99	MF	(Cameroon) CMR	Njongo Priso	12	4	11	3	1	1	0	0
Players sold or loaned out after the start of the season:
2	DF	(Bulgaria) BUL	Pavel Vidanov	3	0	1	0	0+1	0	0+1	0
7	MF	(Bulgaria) BUL	Spas Delev	18	5	12+1	3	3	2	2	0
9	FW	(Brazil) BRA	Michel Platini	15	5	12	4	1	0	2	1
12	GK	(Bulgaria) BUL	Ivan Karadzhov	3	0	2	0	1	0	0	0
27	FW	(Romania) ROU	Ianis Zicu	19	14	13+2	13	1+1	1	2	0
28	DF	(Slovenia) SLO	Denis Halilović	4	0	1+1	0	0	0	2	0
29	FW	(Netherlands) NED	Gregory Nelson	19	2	10+4	2	3	0	1+1	0
77	FW	(Slovenia) SLO	Saša Živec	3	0	1+1	0	0+1	0	0	0

As of 23 May 2012

== Players in/out ==
=== Summer transfers ===
In: Note: Flags indicate national team as defined under FIFA eligibility rules; some limited exceptions apply. Players may hold more than one non-FIFA nationality.

No.	Pos.	Nation	Player
2	DF	BUL	Pavel Vidanov (Loan return from Rapid București)
3	DF	BRA	Ademar (From Cherno More Varna)
10	FW	BRA	Júnior Moraes (From FC Metalurh Donetsk)
13	DF	BUL	Plamen Krachunov (From Lokomotiv Plovdiv)
16	MF	BUL	Aleksandar Yakimov (Free from Pirin Blagoevgrad)
20	DF	BUL	Anton Karachanakov (Free from Pirin Blagoevgrad)
23	DF	BUL	Martin Dechev (Loan return from Ludogorets Razgrad)
24	MF	BUL	Aleksandar Dyulgerov (Free from Pirin Blagoevgrad)
25	FW	SRB	Nikola Radulović (Loan return from Akademik Sofia)
27	FW	ROU	Ianis Zicu (From Politehnica Timișoara)
28	DF	SLO	Denis Halilović (From Saturn Ramenskoye, previously on loan at Willem II)
72	DF	BUL	Kristiyan Velinov (Loan return from Akademik Sofia)
77	FW	SLO	Saša Živec (From NK Primorje)
92	GK	ALG	Raïs M'Bolhi (Loaned from Krylia Sovetov Samara)

Out: Note: Flags indicate national team as defined under FIFA eligibility rules; some limited exceptions apply. Players may hold more than one non-FIFA nationality.

No.	Pos.	Nation	Player
2	DF	BUL	Pavel Vidanov (Released)
6	DF	ITA	Giuseppe Aquaro (Released to Karlsruher SC)
10	MF	ARG	Lucas Trecarichi (Released)
12	GK	BUL	Ivan Karadzhov (Terminated contract)
13	GK	BUL	Bozhidar Stoychev (Loaned at Bdin Vidin, previously on loan at Akademik Sofia)
13	MF	BUL	Tomislav Kostadinov (Loaned at Chavdar Etropole)
17	MF	BUL	Chetin Sadula (Loaned at Kaliakra Kavarna)
21	MF	BUL	Kosta Yanev (Released to Lokomotiv Sofia)
23	MF	BUL	Emil Gargorov (Sold to Ludogorets Razgrad)
24	MF	BUL	Aleksandar Tonev (Sold to Lech Poznań)
24	MF	BUL	Aleksandar Dyulgerov (Loaned at Montana)
25	FW	SRB	Nikola Radulović (Loaned at Akademik Sofia)
26	FW	IRL	Cillian Sheridan (Loaned at St Johnstone)
28	MF	BRA	Marquinhos (Sold to Anorthosis Famagusta)
28	DF	SLO	Denis Halilović (Released)
30	DF	ITA	Fabrizio Grillo (Released to AS Varese)
72	DF	BUL	Kristiyan Velinov (Loaned at Akademik Sofia)
77	FW	SLO	Saša Živec (Released)
—	FW	BUL	Dimitar Iliev (Released, previously on loan at Pirin Blagoevgrad)

=== Winter transfers ===
In: Note: Flags indicate national team as defined under FIFA eligibility rules; some limited exceptions apply. Players may hold more than one non-FIFA nationality.

No.	Pos.	Nation	Player
9	FW	GEQ	Iván Bolado (From Cartagena)
17	FW	MAD	Anicet Andrianantenaina (Free from Chernomorets Burgas)
21	MF	BUL	Kosta Yanev (Free from Lokomotiv Sofia)
24	DF	NED	Ilias Haddad (Free from St Mirren)
26	MF	BUL	Nikolay Dyulgerov (Free from Ludogorets Razgrad)
31	MF	BUL	Vladimir Ivanov (Loan return from Akademik Sofia)
32	FW	ROU	Georgian Păun (Loaned from Dinamo București)
77	MF	ESP	Antonio Tomás (Free from Real Zaragoza)
99	MF	CMR	Njongo Priso (From AEK Larnaca)

Out: Note: Flags indicate national team as defined under FIFA eligibility rules; some limited exceptions apply. Players may hold more than one non-FIFA nationality.

No.	Pos.	Nation	Player
7	FW	BUL	Spas Delev (Sold to Mersin İdmanyurdu SK)
9	FW	BRA	Michel Platini (Sold to Dinamo București)
27	FW	ROU	Ianis Zicu (Sold to Pohang Steelers)
29	FW	NED	Gregory Nelson (Sold to Metalurh Donetsk)
—	MF	BUL	Tomislav Kostadinov (Released to Litex Lovech, previously loaned at Chavdar Etropole)
—	GK	BUL	Bozhidar Stoychev (Loaned at Neftohimik Burgas)

== Pre-season and friendlies ==
Win Draw Loss Fixtures

=== Pre-season ===
8 July 2011 Friendly	CSKA	1–1	Bdin Vidin	Samokov
18:00	Delev 28'	gong.bg	Rusev 61'	Stadium: Iskar; Referee: Dimitar Burov

13 July 2011 Friendly	CSKA (Bulgaria)	3–2	(Greece) PAOK	Zutphen, Netherlands
20:30	Trifonov 27'; Delev 49'; Zicu 53'; Bandalovski (yellow card) 41'	gong.bg	Vieirinha 9'; Tsoukalas 70'; Fotakis (yellow card) 55'	Stadium: Het Zuiderpark

16 July 2011 Friendly	CSKA (Bulgaria)	2–1	(Poland) Cracovia Kraków	Zutphen, Netherlands
20:00	Živec 14'; Kostov 57'	gong.bg	Kosanović 65'; Suart (yellow card) 63'	Stadium: Het Zuiderpark
Note: The match was interrupted at 82nd minute due a mass brawl between both teams and officials.

17 July 2011 Friendly	CSKA (Bulgaria)	2–0	(Germany) Rot Weiss Essen	Essen, Germany
16:00	Michel 5', 59'; Nelson (yellow card) 44' (yellow-red card) 52'	gong.bg	Kuta (yellow card) 40'; Schneider (yellow card) 47' (yellow-red card) 90+1'	Stadium: Georg-Melches-Stadion; Attendance: 4,000; Referee: Markus Schüller

20 July 2011 Friendly	CSKA (Bulgaria)	1–1	(Israel) Hapoel Kiryat Shmona	Renkum, Netherlands
18:00	Vidanov 70'	gong.bg	Badash 44'; Ahbed (yellow card) 52'	Stadium: Sportpark Wilhelmina

23 July 2011 Friendly	CSKA (Bulgaria)	0–3	(Netherlands) De Graafschap	Zelhem, Netherlands
19:00		gong.bg	de Leeuw 6' van de Pavert 11'; Meijer 85'	Stadium: De Pol; Attendance: 1,500

24 July 2011 Friendly	CSKA (Bulgaria)	2–1	(Germany) SV Sonsbeck	Sonsbeck, Germany
17:00	Kostov 14'; Moraes 43'	gong.bg	Brannik 44'	Stadium: Willy Lemkens Sportpark

2 August 2011 Friendly	CSKA (Bulgaria)	2–1	(Greece) Atromitos	Pravets
18:30	Moraes 21', 36'; Yakimov (yellow card) 61'	gong.bg	Anastasakos 12'; Karamanos (yellow card) 81'; Beljić (yellow card) 82'	Stadium: Gradski

=== On-season (autumn) ===
31 August 2011 Friendly	CSKA	6–1	Slivnishki Geroy	Sofia
19:00	Michel 19', 60'; Moraes 22'; Nelson 27'; Yakimov 83'; Marinov 87'	gong.bg	Hadzhiev 15'	Stadium: Balgarska Armiya; Referee: Dimitar Burov

3 September 2011 Friendly	CSKA (Bulgaria)	3–0	(North Macedonia) Metalurg Skopje	Sofia
21:00	Delev 35'; Michel 45'; Karachanakov 78'; Halilović (yellow card) 53'; Krachunov (red card) 84'; Moraes (yellow card) 88'	gong.bg	Stevanović (yellow card) 29'	Stadium: Balgarska Armiya

7 September 2011 Friendly	CSKA	6–0	Akademik Sofia	Sofia
18:00	Vidanov 6'; Kostov 18' (pen.); Živec (penalty missed) 36' (pen.); Moraes 52'; Delev 55', 72'; Michel 74'	gong.bg	Manchev (red card) 17'	Stadium: Balgarska Armiya; Referee: Georgi Dimitrov

8 October 2011 Friendly	CSKA (Bulgaria)	4–0	(North Macedonia) Vardar Skopje	Sofia
15:00	Michel 30'; P. Stoyanov 43', 59'; Karachanakov 88'; Trifonov (yellow card)	gong.bg	Ilievski (yellow card)	Stadium: Balgarska Armiya; Attendance: 500; Referee: Adrian Petrov

8 December 2011 Friendly	CSKA	2–1	Slivnishki Geroy	Slivnitsa
14:00	Granchov 24'; Radulović 73'	gong.bg	Genov 65'; Samardzhiev (yellow card) 72'	Stadium: Slivnishki Geroy; Attendance: 100

=== Mid-season ===
23 January 2012 Friendly	CSKA	1–1	Svilengrad	Svilengrad
13:00	Karachanakov 35'	gong.bg	Tsekov 80'	Stadium: Kolodruma; Attendance: 200; Referee: Dimitar Kalchorov

1 February 2012 Friendly	CSKA (Bulgaria)	1–3	(Romania) Concordia Chiajna	Antalya, Turkey
17:30	V. Ivanov 36'; Galchev (red card) 62'	gong.bg	Munteanu 15'; Rochia 59'; Dinu 79'; Popa (red card) 89'	Stadium: Emirhan Sport Centre; Attendance: 20

3 February 2012 Friendly	CSKA (Bulgaria)	3–1	(Switzerland) Biel-Bienne	Antalya, Turkey
17:30	Moraes 3'; Karachanakov 17'; Michel 49'	gong.bg	Doudin 6'	Stadium: Emirhan Sport Centre

6 February 2012 Friendly tournament	CSKA (Bulgaria)	2–1	(Montenegro) Budućnost	Belek, Turkey
15:00	Moraes 75' (pen.); Michel 90+1'	gong.bg	Mugoša 77'	Stadium: IC Hotel Sports Centre; Attendance: 20

8 February 2012 Friendly tournament	CSKA (Bulgaria)	1–2	(Romania) Dinamo București	Belek, Turkey
17:00	Moraes 28' (pen.); Moraes (yellow card) 56'; Michel (red card) 83'	gong.bg	Rus 8'; Alexe 68'; Scarlatache (yellow card) 56'; Rus (red card) 83'	Stadium: IC Hotel Sports Centre; Attendance: 50

11 February 2012 Friendly	CSKA (Bulgaria)	1–2	(Romania) Rapid București	Antalya, Turkey
21:00	Michel 4'	gong.bg	Teixeira 36'; Grigorie 74' (pen.)	Stadium: Emirhan Sport Centre

13 February 2012 Friendly	CSKA (Bulgaria)	5–0	(Switzerland) Wiesendangen	Antalya, Turkey
14:00	Dyulgerov 42'; Karachanakov 49'; Kostov 57'; Tchuto 86'; Peter 88' (o.g.)	gong.bg		Stadium: Emirhan Sport Centre; Attendance: 150

20 February 2012 Friendly tournament 45 mins	CSKA (Bulgaria)	0–1	(Libya) Al-Nasr Benghazi	Benghazi, Libya
15:40			Taarak 20'	Stadium: Martyrs of February Stadium; Attendance: 500

20 February 2012 Friendly tournament 45 mins	CSKA (Bulgaria)	1–0	(Libya) Al-Ahly Tripoli	Benghazi, Libya
17:10	Kostov 42'			Stadium: Martyrs of February Stadium; Attendance: 4,000

22 February 2012 Friendly tournament 45 mins	CSKA (Bulgaria)	2–0	(Libya) Al-Nasr Benghazi	Benghazi, Libya
16:30	Galchev 18'; Kostov 45'			Stadium: Martyrs of February Stadium

22 February 2012 Friendly tournament 45 mins	CSKA (Bulgaria)	0–0 (1–4 p)	(Libya) Al-Ahly Tripoli	Benghazi, Libya
17:30				Stadium: Martyrs of February Stadium

28 February 2012 Friendly	CSKA	1–0	Bdin Vidin	Pravets
14:30	N. Dyulgerov 89'; N. Dyulgerov (yellow card) 42'	gong.bg	Mamadu (yellow card) 28'; Gadzhalov (yellow card) 66'	Stadium: Gradski

=== On-season (spring) ===
5 April 2012 Friendly	CSKA	0–3	Spartak Pleven	Tsarsko selo
17:00		Report	Kraev 47', 51', 90'	Stadium: Tsarsko selo

14 April 2012 Friendly	CSKA	2–1	Lokomotiv Sofia	Tsarsko selo
14:00	Tomás 52'; Yakimov 66'	Report	Velichkov 86'	Stadium: Tsarsko selo Attendance: 150

== Competitions ==
=== A Group ===
==== Table ====
Pos	Team	Pld	W	D	L	GF	GA	GD	Pts	Qualification or relegation
1	Ludogorets Razgrad (C)	30	22	4	4	73	16	+57	70	Qualification for Champions League second qualifying round
2	CSKA Sofia	30	22	3	5	60	19	+41	69	Qualification for Europa League second qualifying round
3	Levski Sofia	30	20	2	8	61	28	+33	62	Qualification for Europa League second qualifying round
4	Chernomorets Burgas	30	17	9	4	57	23	+34	60	
5	Litex Lovech	30	17	8	5	57	28	+29	59	

Source: A PFG (in Bulgarian)
Rules for classification: 1st points; 2nd head-to-head points; 3rd head-to-head goal difference; 4th head-to-head goals scored; 5th head-to-head away goals scored; 6th goal difference; 7th goals scored
(C) Champions

==== Results summary ====
Overall								Home						Away					
Pld	W	D	L	GF	GA	GD	Pts	W	D	L	GF	GA	GD	W	D	L	GF	GA	GD
30	22	3	5	60	19	+41	69	13	1	1	38	9	+29	9	2	4	22	10	+12

Last updated: 23 May 2012.
Source: Soccerway

==== Results by round ====
Round	1	2	3	4	5	6	7	8	9	10	11	12	13	14	15	16	17	18	19	20	21	22	23	24	25	26	27	28	29	30
Ground	A	H	A	A	H	A	H	A	H	A	H	A	H	A	H	H	A	H	H	A	H	A	H	A	H	A	H	A	H	A
Result	W	W	W	W	W	W	W	W	L	D	W	D	W	W	D	W	L	W	W	W	W	W	W	W	W	L	W	L	W	L
Position	2	3	2	1	1	1	1	1	2	2	2	2	2	2	2	2	3	2	2	1	1	1	1	1	1	1	1	1	1	2

Source: See Results
A = Away; H = Home; W = Win; D = Draw; L = Loss

==== Fixtures and results ====
7 August 2011 1	Lokomotiv Sofia	1–2	CSKA	Sofia
20:30	Romanov 72'; Atanasov (yellow card) 50'; Lahchev (yellow card) 90+2'	Report	Delev 3'; Zicu 58'; Michel (yellow card) 32'; Zicu (yellow card) 84'; Kostov (yellow card) 90+1'	Stadium: Vasil Levski; Attendance: 2,370; Referee: Aleksandar Kostadinov (Sofia)

13 August 2011 2	CSKA	1–0	Chernomorets	Sofia
20:00	Zicu 79'; Popov (yellow card) 55'; Karadzhov (yellow card) 90+2'	Report	Baldzhiyski (yellow card) 38'; Nikolov (yellow card) 64'; Tsonkov (yellow card) 70'; Dyankov (yellow card) 90+3'	Stadium: Balgarska Armiya; Attendance: 2,730; Referee: Georgi Yordanov (Gabrovo)

21 August 2011 3	Kaliakra	1–2	CSKA	Kavarna
20:30	D. Dimitrov 65'; Zakov (yellow card) 30'; Yashar (yellow card) 47'; Petkov (yellow card) 62'; A. Dimitrov (yellow card) 78'; G. Filipov (yellow card) 79'	Report	Yanchev 21'; Nelson 31'; Ademar (red card) 36'; Delev (yellow card) 48' (yellow-red card) 85'; M'Bolhi (yellow card) 74'; Galchev (yellow card) 79'	Stadium: Kavarna; Attendance: 1,680; Referee: Stanislav Todorov (Shumen)

28 August 2011 4	Montana	0–5	CSKA	Montana
17:30	Vodenicharov (yellow card) 23'; Koemdzhiev (yellow card) 28'; Gadzhev (yellow card) 53' (yellow-red card) 66'; D.Kr.Iliev (yellow card) 61'	Report	Zicu 48', 49'; Michel 54', 90+2'; Yanchev 72'; Nelson (yellow card) 21'; Dechev (yellow card) 79'; K.Stoyanov (yellow card) 80'	Stadium: Ogosta; Attendance: 1,000; Referee: Georgi Kabakov (Plovdiv)

12 September 2011 5	CSKA	3–0	Lokomotiv Plovdiv	Sofia
20:00	Michel 19'; Moraes 36' (pen.); Delev 66'; K. Stoyanov (yellow card) 45+1'; Ademar (yellow card) 63'; Yanchev (yellow card) 72'	Report	V. Georgiev (yellow card) 28'; Lucchini (yellow card) 35'; Zlatinski (yellow card) 63'	Stadium: Balgarska Armiya; Attendance: 3,400; Referee: Tasko Taskov (Sofia)

17 September 2011 6	Beroe	0–1	CSKA	Stara Zagora
16:30	Penev (yellow card) 45+1'	Report	Zicu 35'; Krachunov (yellow card) 11'; Zicu (yellow card) 53'	Stadium: Beroe; Attendance: 5,030; Referee: Anton Genov (Sofia)

26 September 2011 7	CSKA	4–1	Vidima-Rakovski	Sofia
20:00	Krachunov 23'; Delev 35'; Zicu 72', 87' (pen.); Krachunov (yellow card) 17'; Ademar (yellow card) 75'	Report	Panov 10'; Branekov (yellow card) 15'; Yuliyanov (yellow card) 87'	Stadium: Balgarska Armiya; Attendance: 1,000; Referee: Stefan Apostolov (Blagoevgrad)

2 October 2011 8	Svetkavitsa	0–3	CSKA	Targovishte
16:00	I. Damyanov (yellow card) 54'; Shokolarov (yellow card) 60'; Yordanov (yellow card) 87'	Report	Michel 66'; Moraes 72', 88' (pen.); K. Stoyanov (yellow card) 50'	Stadium: Dimitar Burkov; Attendance: 5,400; Referee: Nikola Popov (Sofia)

15 October 2011 9	CSKA	1–2	Slavia	Sofia
18:00	Zicu 89'; Moraes (yellow card) 13'; Nelson (yellow card) 49'; Zicu (yellow card) 60'	Report	Iliev 6'; Bozhov 24' (pen.); Ivanov (yellow card) 17'; Marques (yellow card) 19'; Dimitrov (yellow card) 64'; Kunchev (yellow card) 81'; Bozhov (yellow card) 81'	Stadium: Balgarska Armiya; Attendance: 1,470; Referee: Georgi Kabakov (Plovdiv)

21 October 2011 10	Cherno More	0–0	CSKA	Varna
16:00	Camazzola (yellow card) 80'; S. Aleksandrov (red card) 88'	Report	Nelson (yellow card) 36'; Moraes (yellow card) 52'; K. Stoyanov (yellow card) 55'; Krachunov (yellow card) 58'; M'Bolhi (yellow card) 88'	Stadium: Ticha; Attendance: 4,640; Referee: Ahmed Ahmed (Burgas)

28 October 2011 11	CSKA	1–0	Levski	Sofia
17:45	Zicu 25'; P. Stoyanov (yellow card) 22'; Galchev (yellow card) 59'; Yanchev (yellow card) 73'; Moraes (yellow card) 75'; M'Bolhi (yellow card) 90+2'	Report	Miliev (yellow card) 24'; Greene (yellow card) 59'; Tsvetkov (yellow card) 86'; Yovov (yellow card) 90+3'	Stadium: Vasil Levski; Attendance: 8,970; Referee: Tasko Taskov (Sofia)

6 November 2011 12	Botev Vratsa	2–2	CSKA	Vratsa
14:30	Kokonov 17'; Kostadinov 48'; Kovachev (yellow card) 38'; Danchev (yellow card) 66'; Nikolov (yellow card) 70'; Kuang (yellow card) 75'	Report	P. Stoyanov 21'; Kovachev 45' (o.g.); Galchev (yellow card) 32'; Moraes (yellow card) 36'; Krachunov (yellow card) 62'; Moraes (penalty missed) 76'; Ademar (yellow card) 83'	Stadium: Hristo Botev; Attendance: 7,230; Referee: Hristo Ristoskov (Blagoevgrad)

12 November 2011 13	CSKA	3–1	Minyor	Sofia
16:30	Zicu 23', 74', 77'; Delev (yellow card) 57'; Moraes (yellow card) 71'	Report	Bibishkov 63'; Tsvetkov (yellow card) 19'; Vandev (yellow card) 75'	Stadium: Balgarska Armiya; Attendance: 1,020; Referee: Radan Miryanov (Varna)

20 November 2011 14	Litex	0–2	CSKA	Lovech
16:30	Todorov (yellow card) 21'; Thiago (yellow card) 26'; Tom (red card) 59'; Yanev (yellow card) 62'; Zanev (yellow card) 72'	Report	Nelson 54'; Zicu 77'; Krachunov (yellow card) 26'; M'Bolhi (red card) 60'; Trifonov (yellow card) 62'; Delev (yellow card) 63'; Galchev (yellow card) 67'	Stadium: Lovech; Attendance: 4,500; Referee: Ivaylo Stoyanov (Petrich)

28 November 2011 15	CSKA	2–2	Ludogorets	Sofia
18:00	Moraes 2', 20'; Krachunov (yellow card) 24'; Moraes (yellow card) 53'; P. Stoyanov (yellow card) 57'	Report	Quixadá 86'; Stoyanov 90'; Dyakov (yellow card) 19'; Barthe (yellow card) 53'; Gargorov (yellow card) 60'	Stadium: Balgarska Armiya; Attendance: 6,000; Referee: Georgi Yordanov (Gabrovo)

22 March 2012 16	CSKA	4–0	Lokomotiv Sofia	Sofia
20:00	Karachanakov 27'; Priso 76'; Bandalovski 82'; Moraes 86'; P. Stoyanov (yellow card) 77'	Report	Petkov (yellow card) 44'	Stadium: Balgarska Armiya; Attendance: 5,540; Referee: Hristo Ristoskov (Blagoevgrad)

4 March 2012 17	Chernomorets	2–0	CSKA	Burgas
15:45	Krachunov 61' (o.g.); Assis 74'; Yordanov (yellow card) 14'; Kishishev (yellow card) 51'; Faug-Porret (yellow card) 67'; Assis (yellow card) 75'; Tsonkov (yellow card) 86'	Report	Moraes (yellow card) 45+3'; Priso (yellow card) 64'; Kostov (yellow card) 82'; Ademar (yellow card) 88'	Stadium: Lazur; Attendance: 8,940; Referee: Ivaylo Stoyanov (Petrich)

11 March 2012 18	CSKA	3–1	Kaliakra	Sofia
13:30	Granchov 10'; Moraes 49', 90+1'; Krachunov (yellow card) 53'; Priso (yellow card) 74'	Report	Yashar 79'; Filipov (yellow card) 68'; Kichukov (yellow card) 77'; Madzhirov (yellow card) 90+3'	Stadium: Balgarska Armiya; Attendance: 1,520; Referee: Vihren Manev (Sofia)

19 March 2012 19	CSKA	2–0	Montana	Sofia
20:00	Moraes 45'; Priso 90'; Ivanov (yellow card) 76'	Report	Gadzhev (yellow card) 15' (yellow-red card) 47'; Koparanov (yellow card) 22'	Stadium: Balgarska Armiya; Attendance: 880; Referee: Tsvetan Krastev (Varna)

25 March 2012 20	Lokomotiv Plovdiv	0–3	CSKA	Plovdiv
15:30	Y. Todorov (yellow card) 20'; Zlatinski (yellow card) 23'; Dakson (red card) 64'; Bengelloun (yellow card) 78'	Report	Karachanakov 3'; Priso 57'; Moraes 90+2'; Karachanakov (yellow card) 26'; N. Dyulgerov (yellow card) 35'; Priso (red card) 64'	Stadium: Lauta; Attendance: 7,160; Referee: Aleksandar Kostadinov (Sofia)

28 March 2012 21	CSKA	1–0	Beroe	Sofia
19:00	Karachanakov 28'; Karachanakov (yellow card) 25'; Păun (yellow card) 45+1'; Haddad (yellow card) 73'	Report	Iliev (yellow card) 44'	Stadium: Balgarska Armiya; Attendance: 6,540; Referee: Georgi Kabakov (Plovdiv)

1 April 2012 22	Vidima-Rakovski	0–1	CSKA	Sevlievo
13:30	Nakov (yellow card) 72'; Minkov (yellow card) 83'	Report	Kostov 54'; Păun (yellow card) 59'	Stadium: Rakovski; Attendance: 1,200; Referee: Georgi Ignatov (Sofia)

9 April 2012 23	CSKA	3–0	Svetkavista	Sofia
20:00	Karachanakov 9'; Galchev 39'; Păun 41'	Report	Georgiev (red card) 5'; Stoyanov (yellow card) 33'	Stadium: Balgarska Armiya; Attendance: 3,690; Referee: Georgi Dimitrov (Sofia)

19 April 2012 24	Slavia	0–1	CSKA	Sofia
16:30	P.Dimitrov (yellow card) 49'; Sandanski (yellow card) 57'; R.Dimitrov (yellow card) 90+2'	Report	Kostov 50'; Yanev (yellow card) 83'; N.Dyulgerov (yellow card) 86'; Kostov (yellow card) 90+2'	Stadium: Ovcha Kupel; Attendance: 850; Referee: Ahmed Ahmed (Burgas)

22 April 2012 25	CSKA	4–1	Cherno More	Sofia
13:30	Galchev 6'; Moraes 25', 41' (pen.); Popov 79' (o.g.); Trifonov (yellow card) 44'	Report	Iliev 30' (pen.); Camazzola (yellow card) 73'	Stadium: Balgarska Armiya; Attendance: 8,660; Referee: Hristo Ristoskov (Blagoevgrad)

29 April 2012 26	Levski	1–0	CSKA	Sofia
17:45	Cristovão 49'; Gadzhev (yellow card) 63'; Starokin (yellow card) 69'; Dimov (yellow card) 75'; Calvo (yellow card) 81'; Miliev (yellow card) 88'; Mulder (yellow card) 90'; Iliev (yellow card) 90+2'; Cristovão (yellow card) 90+4'	Report	N. Dyulgerov (yellow card) 62'; Moraes (yellow card) 68'	Stadium: Vasil Levski; Attendance: 20,000; Referee: Nikolay Yordanov (Sofia)

7 May 2012 27	CSKA	2–0	Botev Vratsa	Sofia
19:00	Păun 40'; Moraes 84'; Dechev (yellow card) 7'; Galchev (yellow card) 70'; Petrov (yellow card) 90+2'	Report	Marinov (yellow card) 24'; Valeriev (yellow card) 27'; Naydenov (yellow card) 36'; Iliev (yellow card) 70'	Stadium: Balgarska Armiya; Attendance: 2,950; Referee: Radan Miryanov (Varna)

12 May 2012 28	Minyor	2–0	CSKA	Pernik
17:00	Stoychev 52'; Trajanov 82'; Markov (yellow card) 77'	Report	Moraes (penalty missed) 78'	Stadium: Minyor; Attendance: 2,840; Referee: Tasko Taskov (Sofia)

19 May 2012 29	CSKA	4–1	Litex	Sofia
16:30	Moraes 25', 38', 47'; Krachunov 64'	Report	Tsvetanov 68'; Bodurov (yellow card) 16'; Bozhikov (yellow card) 60'; Itoua (yellow card) 81'	Stadium: Balgarska Armiya; Attendance: 8,000; Referee: Aleksandar Kostadinov (Sofia)

23 May 2012 30	Ludogorets	1–0	CSKA	Razgrad
20:00	Ivanov 19'; Ivanov (yellow card) 14'; Barthe (yellow card) 30'; Dyakov (yellow card) 44' (yellow-red card) 58'; Marcelinho (yellow card) 67'; Aleksandrov (yellow card) 72'; Vitinha (yellow card) 84'; Minev (yellow card) 87'; Golubović (yellow card) 90+5'	Report	Bandalovski (yellow card) 15'; Galchev (yellow card) 26'; Krachunov (yellow card) 30'; Granchov (red card) 45'; M'Bolhi (yellow card) 68'	Stadium: Ludogorets Arena; Attendance: 6,200; Referee: Georgi Kabakov (Plovdiv)

=== Bulgarian Cup ===
23 November 2011 Second Round	Slavia	0–1	CSKA	Sofia
13:30	Junior (yellow card) 28'; Zlatkov (yellow card) 33'; Iliev (yellow card) 55'	Report	Moraes 20'; Bandalovski (yellow card) 31'; Yanchev (yellow card) 49'; Krachunov (yellow card) 66'; Delev (yellow card) 73'	Stadium: Ovcha Kupel; Attendance: 500; Referee: Georgi Kabakov (Plovdiv)

3 December 2011 Third Round	Spartak Pleven	0–3	CSKA	Pleven
13:00	Grigorov (yellow card) 3'; Vankov (yellow card) 40'; Shopov (yellow card) 53'	Report	Galchev 21'; Krachunov 56'; K. Stoyanov 81'; Karachanakov (yellow card) 64'	Stadium: Slavi Aleksiev; Attendance: 15,000; Referee: Nikolay Yordanov (Sofia)

15 March 2012 Quarterfinals	Septemvri Simitli	2–1	CSKA	Simitli
15:30	Gushterov 31'; A. Nikolov 49'; A. Todorov (yellow card) 7'; Katsarski (yellow card) 43'; Lyuleyski (yellow card) 67'; T. Todorov (yellow card) 90'; Koemdzhiev (yellow card) 90+3'; T. Nikolov (yellow card) 90+5'	Report	Priso 88'; Galchev (yellow card) 25'; Dechev (yellow card) 36'; Dyulgerov (yellow card) 45+1'; Bandalovski (yellow card) 50'; Priso (yellow card) 52'; Granchov (yellow card) 90+4'	Stadium: Struma; Attendance: 3,060; Referee: Vladimir Valkov (Plovdiv)

=== Bulgarian Super Cup ===
By winning in the 2010–11 Bulgarian Cup, CSKA Sofia will play against the 2010–11 Bulgarian champions Litex Lovech for the Supercup.

30 July 2011 Final	CSKA	3–1	Litex Lovech	Burgas
21:00 EET	Delev 16', 58'; Zicu 48' (pen.); K. Stoyanov (yellow card) 62'	Report	Codó 6'; Tsvetkov (yellow card) 10'; Josse (yellow card) 47'; Tom (red card) 50'	Stadium: Lazur; Attendance: 8,000; Referee: Anton Genov (Sofia)

=== Europa League ===
By winning in the 2010–11 Bulgarian Cup, CSKA Sofia qualified for the Europa League. They started in the play-off round.

==== Play-off round ====
18 August 2011 First leg	Steaua București (Romania)	2–0	(Bulgaria) CSKA	Cluj-Napoca, Romania
20:30	Galamaz 16'; Tatu 77'; Tănase (yellow card) 41'; Bourceanu (yellow card) 55'; Rusescu (yellow card) 87'; Nicoliţă (yellow card) 90+1'	Report	Michel (yellow card) 34'; Ademar (yellow card) 38'; Yanchev (yellow card) 72'	Stadium: Dr. Constantin Rădulescu; Attendance: 20,700; Referee: Tommy Skjerven (Norway)

25 August 2011 Second leg	CSKA (Bulgaria)	1–1 (1–3 agg.)	(Romania) Steaua București	Sofia, Bulgaria
20:30	Michel 83'; Michel (yellow card) 67'	Report	Tănase 73'; Galamaz (yellow card) 39'; Nicoliţă (yellow card) 67'; Tănase (yellow card) 69'	Stadium: Vasil Levski; Attendance: 27,200; Referee: Pol van Boekel (the Netherlands)

== UEFA Club Rankings ==
This is the current UEFA Club Rankings, including season 2010–11.

Rank	Team	Points	Mvmnt
142	(Portugal) Vitória de Guimarães	11.239	▼ (−17)
143	(Austria) Rapid Wien	11.140	▼ (−7)
144	(Sweden) Helsingborgs IF	10.825	▲ (+5)
145	(Ukraine) Karpaty Lviv	10.776	New
146	(Romania) FC Timișoara	10.664	▼ (−8)
147	(Bulgaria) CSKA Sofia	10.557	▼ (−34)
148	(Switzerland) Grasshopper Club Zürich	10.480	▼ (−15)
149	(Russia) Sibir Novosibirsk (Russia) Dynamo Moscow (Russia) Amkar Perm	10.441	New ▲ (+5) ▲ (+5)
152	(Ukraine) Tavriya Simferopol (Ukraine) Metalurh Donetsk (Ukraine) Vorskla Poltava	10.267	New ▼ (−8) ▲ (+9)
155	(Poland) Wisła Kraków	10.183	▲ (+10)
156	(Romania) Vaslui	10.164	▼ (−11)

== See also ==
- PFC CSKA Sofia
