= 2011–12 PFC Litex Lovech season =

Litex Lovech
2011–12 season
- Manager: Lyuboslav Penev (until 24 October); Atanas Dzhambazki (from 24 October to 31 December); Hristo Stoichkov (from 5 January 2012)
- Stadium: Lovech Stadium
- A Group: 5th
- Bulgarian Cup: Semi-finals
- Bulgarian Supercup: Runners-up
- UEFA Champions League: Third qualifying round
- UEFA Europa League: Play-off round
Home colours	Away colours	Third colours

The 2011–12 season was Professional Football Club Litex Lovech's 17th consecutive season in the A Group. In addition to the domestic league, Litex Lovech participated in this season's editions of the Bulgarian Cup, Bulgarian Supercup, UEFA Champions League and UEFA Europa League.

== Squad ==
Note: Flags indicate national team as defined under FIFA eligibility rules; some limited exceptions apply. Players may hold more than one non-FIFA nationality.

No.	Pos.	Nation	Player
1	GK	BUL	Ilko Pirgov
2	DF	BUL	Kiril Dinchev
2	DF	BUL	Kristiyan Malinov
3	DF	BUL	Petar Zanev
4	DF	BUL	Vasil Bozhikov
5	DF	FRA	Bernard Onanga Itoua
6	DF	FRA	Maxime Josse
7	MF	BUL	Hristo Yanev
8	MF	BUL	Nikola Kolev
9	FW	BUL	Svetoslav Todorov
10	MF	BRA	Sandrinho
11	FW	BRA	Thiago Miracema
14	MF	ALB	Armando Vajushi

No.	Pos.	Nation	Player
15	MF	BUL	Tomi Kostadinov
16	MF	BUL	Strahil Popov
17	MF	BUL	Georgi Milanov
18	DF	BUL	Iliya Milanov
19	FW	BUL	Rumen Rumenov
21	DF	BUL	Aleksandar Tsvetkov
23	MF	SRB	Nebojša Jelenković
24	MF	BUL	Angel Zdravchev
27	FW	BUL	Momchil Tsvetanov
30	GK	BUL	Evgeni Aleksandrov
33	DF	BUL	Nikolay Bodurov
77	FW	BUL	Galin Ivanov
99	FW	BRA	Marcelo Nicácio

== Competitions ==
=== Overview ===
Competition	First match	Last match	Starting round	Final position	Record							
Competition	First match	Last match	Starting round	Final position	Pld	W	D	L	GF	GA	GD	Win %
A Group	7 August 2011	23 May 2012	Matchday 1	5th	30	17	8	5	57	28	+29	56.67
Bulgarian Cup	23 November 2011	11 April 2012	Second round	Semi-finals	4	3	0	1	12	1	+11	75.00
Bulgarian Supercup	30 July 2011		Final	Runners-up	1	0	0	1	1	3	−2	0.00
UEFA Champions League	12 July 2011	3 August 2011	Second qualifying round	Third qualifying round	4	2	0	2	7	6	+1	50.00
UEFA Europa League	18 August 2011	25 August 2011	Play-off round	Play-off round	2	0	0	2	1	3	−2	0.00
Total					41	22	8	11	78	41	+37	53.66

Source: Competitions

=== Bulgarian Supercup ===
Litex Lovech, as A Group winners in the previous season, played against CSKA Sofia in the 2011 Bulgarian Supercup, who themselves won the Bulgarian Cup.

30 July 2011 Final	Litex Lovech	1–3	CSKA Sofia	Burgas
20:00 EEST (UTC+3)	Codó 6'; Tsvetkov (yellow card) 11'; Josse (yellow card) 48'; Tom I (red card) 50'	Report	Delev 16', 58'; Zicu 48'; Stoyanov (yellow card) 62'	Stadium: Stadion Lazur; Referee: Anton Genov

=== First League ===
==== League table ====
Pos	Team	Pld	W	D	L	GF	GA	GD	Pts	Qualification or relegation
3	Levski Sofia	30	20	2	8	61	28	+33	62	Qualification for Europa League second qualifying round
4	Chernomorets Burgas	30	17	9	4	57	23	+34	60	
5	Litex Lovech	30	17	8	5	57	28	+29	59	
6	Lokomotiv Plovdiv	30	17	6	7	44	39	+5	57	Qualification for Europa League second qualifying round (Note: Ludogorets Razgrad won the 2011–12 Bulgarian Cup competition but were qualified for 2012–13 UEFA Champions League via winning the league, hence their Europa League berth was awarded to the cup runners-up, Lokomotiv Plovdiv.)
7	Cherno More	30	16	4	10	46	25	+21	52	

Source: A PFG (in Bulgarian)
Rules for classification: 1st points; 2nd head-to-head points; 3rd head-to-head goal difference; 4th head-to-head goals scored; 5th head-to-head away goals scored; 6th goal difference; 7th goals scored

==== Results summary ====
Overall								Home						Away					
Pld	W	D	L	GF	GA	GD	Pts	W	D	L	GF	GA	GD	W	D	L	GF	GA	GD
30	17	8	5	57	28	+29	59	11	3	1	34	9	+25	6	5	4	23	19	+4

Source: Competitions

==== Matches ====
7 August 2011 1	Litex Lovech	2–1	Beroe	Lovech
19:00 EEST (UTC+3)	Zanev 62'; Djermanović 76'	Report	Džaferović 7'	Stadium: Lovech Stadium; Referee: Ahmed Ahmed

13 August 2011 2	Vidima-Rakovski	1–1	Litex Lovech	Sevlievo
17:00 EEST (UTC+3)	Stoykov 55'	Report	Todorov 88' (pen.)	Stadium: Rakovski Stadium; Referee: Vihren Manev

21 August 2011 3	Litex Lovech	6–0	Svetkavitsa	Lovech
19:00 EEST (UTC+3)	Todorov 19'; Miracema 55'; Codó 73', 87'; Tsvetanov 78', 90'	Report		Stadium: Lovech Stadium; Referee: Stoyan Denev

28 August 2011 4	Slavia Sofia	0–2	Litex Lovech	Sofia
17:00 EEST (UTC+3)		Report	Codó 31'; Bodurov 90'	Stadium: Ovcha Kupel Stadium; Referee: Tasko Taskov

10 September 2011 5	Litex Lovech	1–0	Cherno More	Lovech
19:00 EEST (UTC+3)	Bodurov 45+2'	Report		Stadium: Lovech Stadium; Referee: Aleksandar Kostadinov

17 September 2011 6	Levski Sofia	3–2	Litex Lovech	Sofia
19:30 EEST (UTC+3)	Tasevski 12'; Raykov 43'; Gadzhev 74'	Report	Djermanović 55'; Josse 71'	Stadium: Georgi Asparuhov Stadium; Referee: Ivaylo Stoyanov

24 September 2011 7	Litex Lovech	3–1	Botev Vratsa	Lovech
18:00 EEST (UTC+3)	Miracema 15'; Yanev 77'; Todorov 89'	Report	B. Kostadinov 10'	Stadium: Lovech Stadium; Referee: Ivan Kirilov

1 October 2011 8	Minyor Pernik	2–2	Litex Lovech	Pernik
15:00 EEST (UTC+3)	Stoyanov 44'; Tom II 50'	Report	G. Milanov 16'; Miracema 73'	Stadium: Stadion Minyor; Referee: Georgi Kabakov

15 October 2011 9	Litex Lovech	0–0	Montana	Lovech
17:00 EEST (UTC+3)		Report		Stadium: Lovech Stadium; Referee: Bogomil Marinov

24 October 2011 10	Litex Lovech	2–1	Ludogorets Razgrad	Lovech
17:00 EEST (UTC+3)	G. Milanov 18'; Yanev 21'	Report	Marcelinho 27'	Stadium: Lovech Stadium; Referee: Ivaylo Stoyanov

31 October 2011 11	Lokomotiv Sofia	1–2	Litex Lovech	Sofia
17:00 EET (UTC+2)	Dafchev 22' (pen.)	Report	Todorov 56', 80'	Stadium: Stadion Balgarska Armia; Referee: Nikolay Yordanov

5 November 2011 12	Litex Lovech	0–0	Chernomorets Burgas	Lovech
17:00 EET (UTC+2)		Report		Stadium: Lovech Stadium; Referee: Georgi Kabakov

20 November 2011 14	Litex Lovech	0–2	CSKA Sofia	Lovech
15:30 EET (UTC+2)		Report	Nelson 54'; Zicu 77'	Stadium: Lovech Stadium; Referee: Ivaylo Stoyanov

27 November 2011 15	Lokomotiv Plovdiv	2–1	Litex Lovech	Plovdiv
13:30 EET (UTC+2)	Sérginho 44'; Carvalho 75'	Report	Todorov 90+2' (pen.)	Stadium: Stadion Lokomotiv; Referee: Stanislav Todorov

3 March 2012 17	Litex Lovech	3–0	Vidima-Rakovski	Lovech
16:30 EET (UTC+2)	Nicácio 7', 28', 86'	Report		Stadium: Lovech Stadium; Referee: Atanas Dimitrov

7 March 2012 13	Kaliakra	0–2	Litex Lovech	Kavarna
14:30 EET (UTC+2)	G. Milanov 18'; Bodurov 60'	Report		Stadium: Kavarna Stadium; Referee: Georgi Kabakov

10 March 2012 18	Svetkavitsa	1–3	Litex Lovech	Targovishte
14:30 EET (UTC+2)	Iliev 84' (pen.)	Report	Nicácio 28', 55'; G. Milanov 59'	Stadium: Stadion Dimitar Burkov; Referee: Radan Miryanov

17 March 2012 19	Litex Lovech	1–0	Slavia Sofia	Lovech
14:30 EET (UTC+2)	Nicácio 12'	Report		Stadium: Lovech Stadium; Referee: Bogomil Marinov

21 March 2012 16	Beroe	1–1	Litex Lovech	Stara Zagora
19:00 EET (UTC+2)	Elias 10'	Report	Yanev 33'	Stadium: Stadion Beroe; Referee: Ivaylo Stoyanov

25 March 2012 20	Cherno More	0–1	Litex Lovech	Varna
14:30 EEST (UTC+3)		Report	Yanev 55'	Stadium: Stadion Ticha; Referee: Hristo Ristoskov

29 March 2012 21	Litex Lovech	1–0	Levski Sofia	Lovech
16:45 EEST (UTC+3)	Yanev 32'	Report		Stadium: Lovech Stadium; Referee: Stanislav Todorov

2 April 2012 22	Botev Vratsa	1–3	Litex Lovech	Vratsa
14:30 EEST (UTC+3)	Kostadinov 55'	Report	Nicácio 51'; Ivanov 58', 80'	Stadium: Stadion Hristo Botev; Referee: Stefan Spasov

7 April 2012 23	Litex Lovech	2–2	Minyor Pernik	Lovech
14:30 EEST (UTC+3)	Nicácio 85'; Todorov 90+3' (pen.)	Report	Stoychev 26'; Brahimi 57'	Stadium: Lovech Stadium; Referee: Stoyan Denev

19 April 2012 24	Montana	1–0	Litex Lovech	Montana
16:00 EEST (UTC+3)	Antonov 49'	Report		Stadium: Stadion Ogosta; Referee: Georgi Kabakov

22 April 2012 25	Ludogorets Razgrad	1–1	Litex Lovech	Razgrad
16:30 EEST (UTC+3)	Genchev 80'	Report	Tsvetanov 75'	Stadium: Huvepharma Arena; Referee: Kalin Lyudmilov

30 April 2012 26	Litex Lovech	2–0	Lokomotiv Sofia	Lovech
19:00 EEST (UTC+3)	Nicácio 47'; G. Milanov 60'	Report		Stadium: Lovech Stadium; Referee: Stanislav Todorov

5 May 2012 27	Chernomorets Burgas	1–1	Litex Lovech	Burgas
19:00 EEST (UTC+3)	Chahechouhe 30'	Report	Nicácio 43' (pen.)	Stadium: efbet Arena; Referee: Ivaylo Stoyanov

12 May 2012 28	Litex Lovech	5–0	Kaliakra	Lovech
19:00 EEST (UTC+3)	Todorov 23' (pen.), 69'; G. Milanov 41'; Vajushi 79'; Tsvetanov 83'	Report		Stadium: Lovech Stadium; Referee: Georgi Dimitrov

19 May 2012 29	CSKA Sofia	4–1	Litex Lovech	Sofia
15:30 EEST (UTC+3)	Moraes 25', 38', 47'; Krachunov 64'	Report	Tsvetanov 68'	Stadium: Stadion Balgarska Armia; Referee: Aleksandar Kostadinov

23 May 2012 30	Litex Lovech	6–2	Lokomotiv Plovdiv	Lovech
15:00 EEST (UTC+3)	Ivanov 14', 72'; Sandrinho 29'; Todorov 53', 55'; Zanev 85'	Report	Zlatinski 27'; Dakson 39'	Stadium: Lovech Stadium; Referee: Hristo Ristoskov

=== Bulgarian Cup ===
23 November 2011 Second round	Sportist Svoge	0–5	Litex Lovech	Svoge
12:30 EET (UTC+2)		Report		Stadium: Stadion Chavdar Tsvetkov

3 December 2011 Third round	Litex Lovech	5–0	Kaliakra Kavarna	Lovech
15:00 EET (UTC+2)	Miracema 6', 64'; Yanev 19'; Todorov 28' (pen.); Djermanović 80'	Report		Stadium: Lovech Stadium; Referee: Aleksandar Kostadinov

14 March 2012 Quarter-finals	Litex Lovech	2–0	Minyor Pernik	Lovech
16:30 EET (UTC+2)	Nicácio 45+3' (pen.); Yanev 55'	Report		Stadium: Lovech Stadium; Referee: Ahmed Ahmed

11 April 2012 Semi-finals	Litex Lovech	0–1	Lokomotiv Plovdiv	Lovech
18:00 EEST (UTC+3)		Report	Bengelloun 79'	Stadium: Lovech Stadium; Referee: Tasko Taskov

=== UEFA Champions League ===
==== Second qualifying round ====
12 July 2011 First leg	Mogren (Montenegro)	1–2	(Bulgaria) Litex Lovech	Podgorica, Montenegro (Note: The match was played at the Podgorica City Stadium in Podgorica, instead of Mogren regular stadium, the Stadion Lugovi in Budva, which did not meet UEFA requirements.)
20:00 CEST (UTC+2)	M. Zec 14'; Gluščević (yellow card) 45+2'; Ćulafić (yellow card) 49'; Božović (yellow card) 82'	Report	Berberović (yellow card) 45+2'; Todorov 77', 79'	Stadium: Podgorica City Stadium; Attendance: 1,500; Referee: Gediminas Mažeika (Lithuania)

19 July 2011 Second leg	Litex Lovech (Bulgaria)	3–0 (5–1 agg.)	(Montenegro) Mogren	Lovech, Bulgaria
19:00 EEST (UTC+3)	Zanev 3'; Todorov 49' (pen.); Yanev 80'	Report	Kapisoda (yellow card) 38'; Lakić (yellow card) 62'; Mirković (yellow card) 80'	Stadium: Lovech Stadium; Attendance: 4,000; Referee: Andre Marriner (England)
Note: Litex Lovech won 5–1 on aggregate.

==== Third qualifying round ====
26 July 2011 First leg	Litex Lovech (Bulgaria)	1–2	(Poland) Wisła Kraków	Lovech, Bulgaria
19:30 EEST (UTC+3)	Tom I 45+1'; Berberović (yellow card) 53'; G. Milanov (yellow card) 82'	Report	Lamey 19'; Chávez (yellow card) 32'; Iliev (yellow card) 45'; Melikson 76'	Stadium: Lovech Stadium; Attendance: 6,800; Referee: Tommy Skjerven (Norway)

3 August 2011 Second leg	Wisła Kraków (Poland)	3–1 (5–2 agg.)	(Bulgaria) Litex Lovech	Kraków, Poland
20:30 CEST (UTC+2)	Melikson 42', 56' (pen.); Wilk 84'	Report	Bodurov 68'; Jelenković (red card) 76'	Stadium: Stadion Miejski im. Henryka Reymana; Attendance: 23,050; Referee: Fırat Aydınus (Turkey)
Note: Wisła Kraków won 5–2 on aggregate.

=== UEFA Europa League ===
==== Play-off round ====
18 August 2011 First leg	Litex Lovech (Bulgaria)	1–2	(Ukraine) Dynamo Kyiv	Lovech, Bulgaria
18:45 EEST (UTC+3)	Vinícius (yellow card) 7'; Zanev (yellow card) 10'; Yanev 13', (yellow card) 71'; Bodurov (yellow card) 84'	Report	Ninković 7' (pen.); Popov (yellow card) 30'; Eremenko (yellow card) 42'; Ideye 77'	Stadium: Lovech Stadium; Attendance: 5,862; Referee: Michael Koukoulakis (Greece)

25 August 2011 Second leg	Dynamo Kyiv (Ukraine)	1–0 (3–1 agg.)	(Bulgaria) Litex Lovech	Kyiv, Ukraine
19:00 EEST (UTC+3)	Milevskyi (yellow card) 24', (goal) 74'; Yarmolenko (yellow card) 44'	Report	Josse (yellow card) 63' (yellow-red card) 78'; G. Milanov (yellow card) 83'	Stadium: Lobanovsky Dynamo Stadium; Attendance: 8,100; Referee: Stuart Attwell (England)
Note: Dynamo Kyiv won 3–1 on aggregate.
