= 2011 Bulgarian Supercup =

Финал за Суперкупата на България 2011
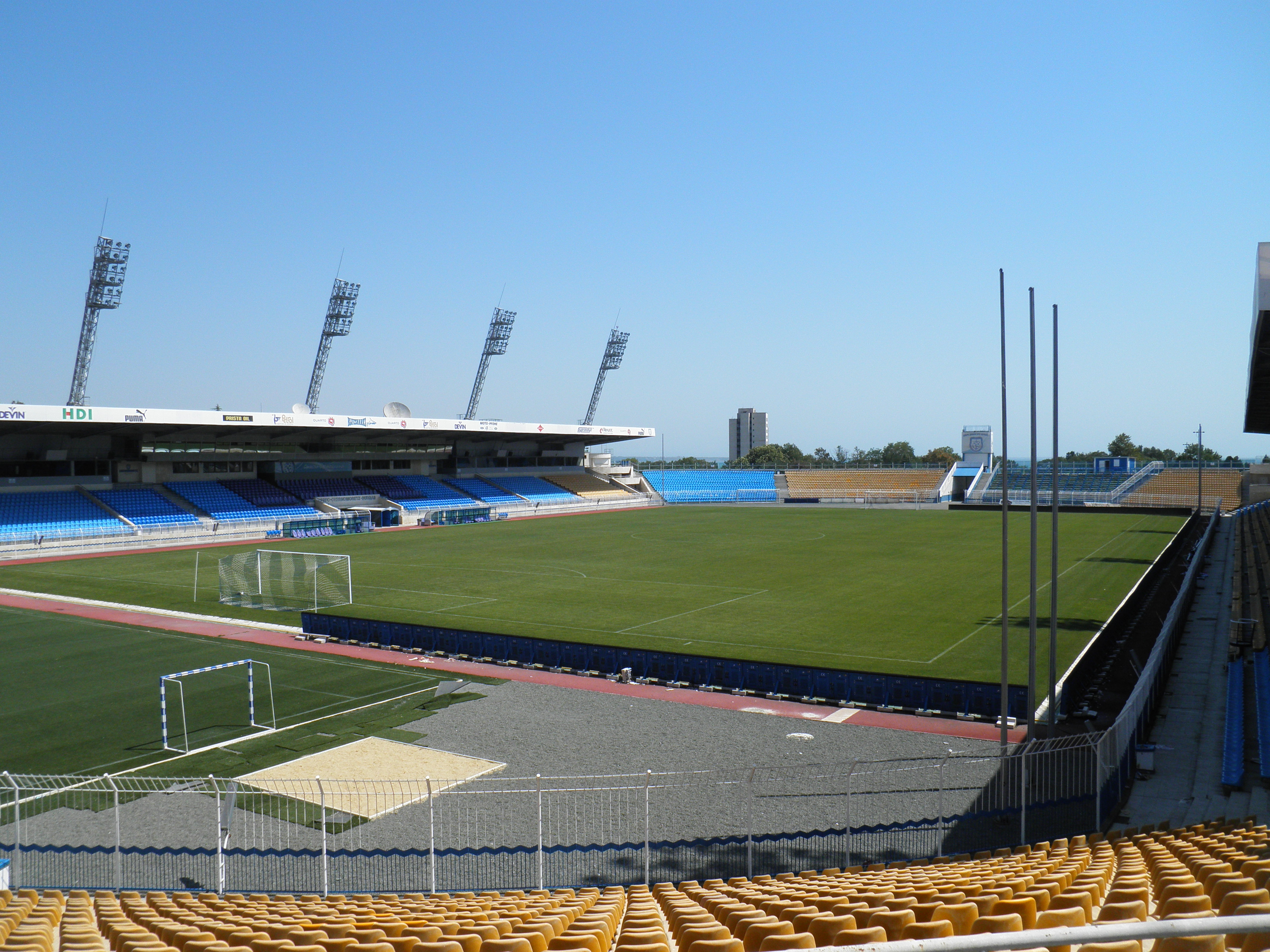
Litex Lovech	CSKA Sofia
A Group	Bulgarian Cup
1	3
- Date: 30 July 2011
- Venue: Lazur, Burgas
- Man of the Match: Spas Delev
- Referee: Anton Genov (Sofia)
- Attendance: 12,620

The 2011 Bulgarian Supercup was the ninth Bulgarian Supercup match, a football match which was contested between the "A" professional football group champion, Litex Lovech, and the winner of the Bulgarian Cup, CSKA Sofia. The match was held on 30 July 2011 at the Lazur Stadium in Burgas.

CSKA Sofia secured a record 4th Bulgarian Supercup. The Reds went on to win this match 3–1, with two goals from Spas Delev, and one from Ianis Zicu after Célio Codó had put Litex ahead in the 6th minute.

== Match details ==
30 July 2011
21:00

Litex Lovech	1–3	CSKA Sofia
Codó 6'	Report	Delev 16', 58'; Zicu 48' (pen.)

Lazur, Burgas
Attendance: 12,620
Referee: Anton Genov (Sofia)

Litex Lovech	CSKA Sofia

LITEX:
GK	30	(Bulgaria) Evgeni Aleksandrov
DF	3	(Bulgaria) Petar Zanev	(c)
DF	5	(France) Bernard Onanga	(substituted off) 61'
DF	6	(France) Maxime Josse	(yellow card) 47'
DF	33	(Bulgaria) Nikolay Bodurov
MF	16	(Bulgaria) Strahil Popov
MF	21	(Bulgaria) Aleksandar Tsvetkov	(yellow card) 10'
MF	19	(Bulgaria) Rumen Rumenov
MF	17	(Bulgaria) Georgi Milanov	(substituted off) 46'
MF	15	(Uruguay) Robert Flores
FW	12	(Brazil) Célio Codó	6' (substituted off) 57'
Substitutes:
GK	31	(Brazil) Vinícius Barrivieira
MF	8	(Brazil) Tom	(substituted on) 46' (red card) 50'
FW	9	(Bulgaria) Svetoslav Todorov
FW	11	(Brazil) Thiago Miracema	(substituted on) 57'
MF	18	(Bulgaria) Iliya Milanov	(substituted on) 61'
DF	22	(Bulgaria) Plamen Nikolov
FW	27	(Bulgaria) Momchil Tsvetanov
Manager:
(Bulgaria) Lyuboslav Penev

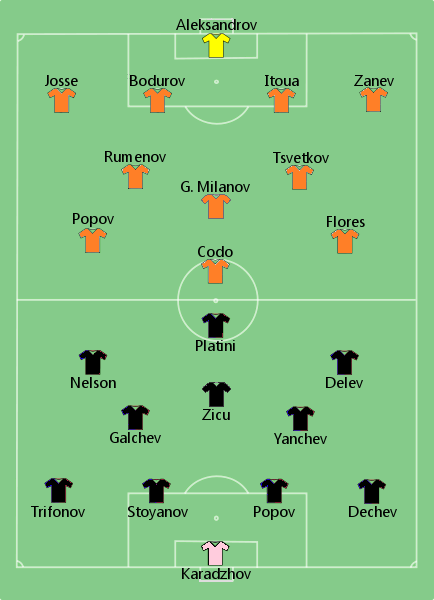

CSKA:
GK	12	(Bulgaria) Ivan Karadzhov
DF	23	(Bulgaria) Martin Dechev	(substituted off) 67'
DF	6	(Bulgaria) Kostadin Stoyanov	(yellow card) 62'
DF	19	(Bulgaria) Apostol Popov
DF	8	(Bulgaria) Rumen Trifonov
MF	5	(Bulgaria) Todor Yanchev	(c)
MF	18	(Bulgaria) Boris Galchev
MF	29	(Netherlands) Gregory Nelson	(substituted off) 82'
MF	7	(Bulgaria) Spas Delev	6' 58'
FW	27	(Romania) Ianis Zicu	48' (pen.) (substituted off) 86'
FW	9	(Brazil) Michel Platini
Substitutes:
GK	88	(Bulgaria) Blagoy Makendzhiev
DF	2	(Bulgaria) Pavel Vidanov	(substituted on) 67'
DF	3	(Brazil) Ademar Júnior
FW	14	(Bulgaria) Stanislav Kostov	(substituted on) 86'
MF	17	(Bulgaria) Chetin Sadula
DF	22	(Bulgaria) Petar Stoyanov
MF	77	(Slovenia) Saša Živec	(substituted on) 82'
Manager:
(Bulgaria) Milen Radukanov

MATCH OFFICIALS

- Assistant referees:
  - (Bulgaria) Nikolay Angelov
  - (Bulgaria) Ventsislav Gavrilov
- Fourth official: (Bulgaria) Ahmed Ahmed

MATCH RULES

- 90 minutes.
- 30 minutes of extra-time if necessary.
- Penalty shoot-out if scores still level.
- Seven named substitutes.
- Maximum of three substitutions.
