= Lachezar =

Lachezar (Bulgarian: Лъчезар) is a Bulgarian given name. Notable people with the name include:

- Lachezar Baltanov (born 1988), Bulgarian football manager and player
- Lachezar Boychev (born 1957), Bulgarian rower
- Lachezar Kotev (born 1998), Bulgarian footballer
- Lachezar Manchev (born 1989), Bulgarian footballer
- Lachezar Stanchev (1908–1992), Bulgarian writer
- Lachezar Stoyanov (born 1943), Bulgarian volleyball player
- Lachezar Tanev (born 1963), Bulgarian footballer and agent
