= Živec =

Živec is a surname. Notable people with the surname include:

- Maja Živec-Škulj (born 1973), German tennis player
- Saša Živec (born 1991), Slovenian footballer
