= Vlado Ivanov =

Bulgarian footballer

Personal information
- Full name: Vlado Yordanov Ivanov
- Date of birth: 15 July 1993 (age 33)
- Place of birth: Bulgaria
- Position: Midfielder

Youth career
- CSKA Sofia

Senior career*
Years	Team	Apps	(Gls)
2011–2013	CSKA Sofia	2	(0)
2011	→ Akademik Sofia (loan)	10	(0)
2013	→ Chavdar Etropole (loan)	2	(0)
2014	Botev Vratsa	10	(2)
2015	Lokomotiv Mezdra	3	(0)
2016	Sofia 2010	12	(1)
- * Club domestic league appearances and goals as of 1 June 2016

Vlado Yordanov Ivanov (Bulgarian: Владо Йорданов Иванов; born 15 July 1993) is a Bulgarian footballer who plays as a midfielder.
