= Petar Stoyanov (footballer) =

Bulgarian footballer

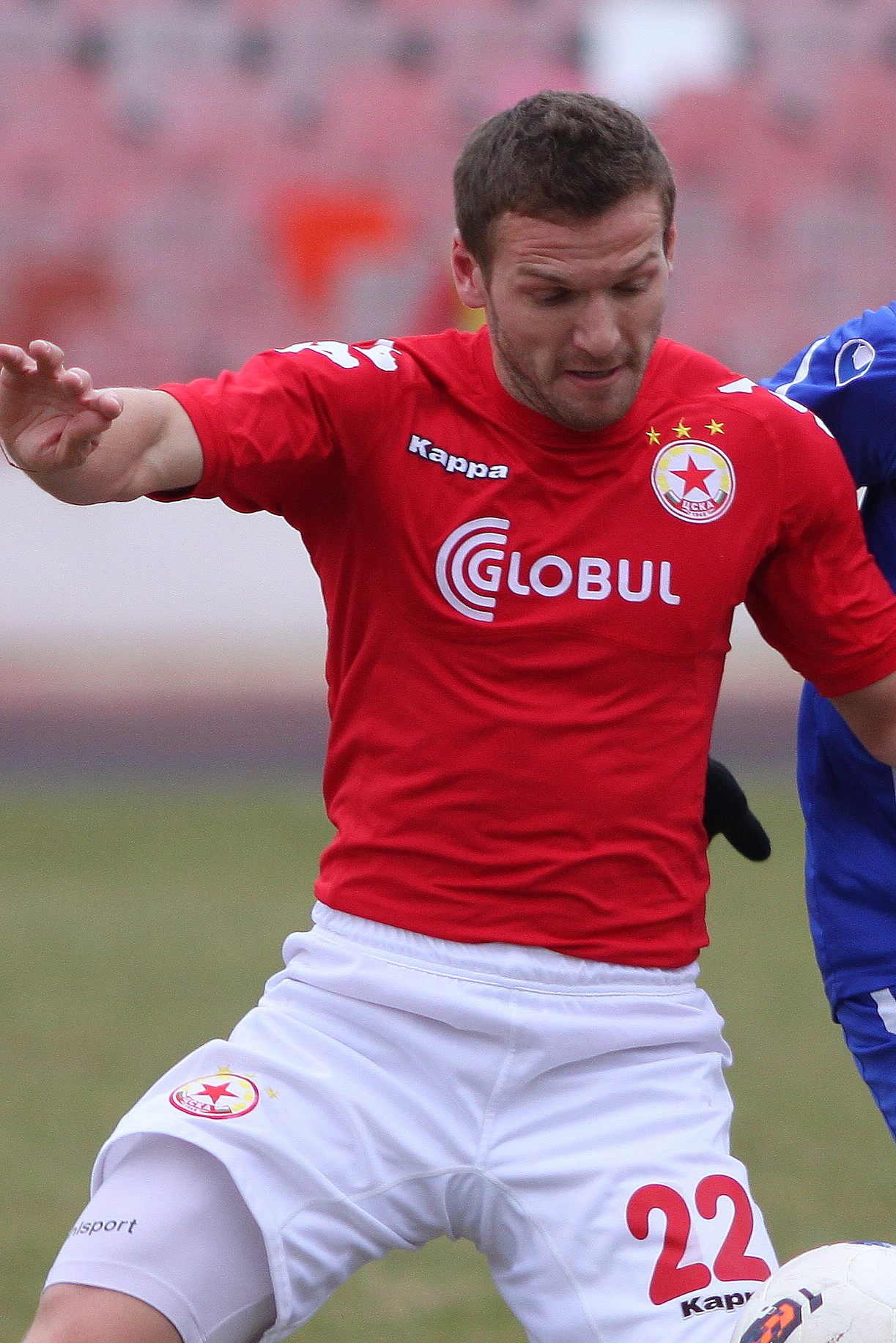

Personal information
- Full name: Petar Petrov Stoyanov
- Date of birth: 15 August 1985 (age 41)
- Place of birth: Sliven, Bulgaria
- Height: 1.80 m (5 ft 11 in)
- Position: Defensive midfielder

Senior career*
Years	Team	Apps	(Gls)
2006–2010	Sliven 2000	77	(4)
2011–2012	CSKA Sofia	18	(1)
2012–2013	Olympiacos Volos	26	(1)
2013	Lyubimets 2007	8	(0)
- * Club domestic league appearances and goals as of 18 December 2013

Petar Petrov Stoyanov (Bulgarian: Петър Петров Стоянов; born on 15 August 1985) is a Bulgarian footballer who plays as a defensive midfielder.

He started his career in Bulgaria with OFC Sliven 2000. With Sliven he completed 77 matches scoring also 4 goals. He left the club at February 2011 for PFC CSKA Sofia.

He stayed at CSKA Sofia for one and a half season. He played 2 matches during his first season at the club and 16 during his second season. He scored his only goal during the second season against POFC Botev Vratsa in a 2–2 away draw.

On 22 September 2012 he signed a one-year contract with Olympiacos Volos. He played his first match for Olympiakos against Kavala in a 2–0 home win.

== Honours ==
CSKA Sofia

- Bulgarian Cup: 2010–11
- Bulgarian Supercup: 2011
