= Aleksandar Yakimov =

Bulgarian footballer

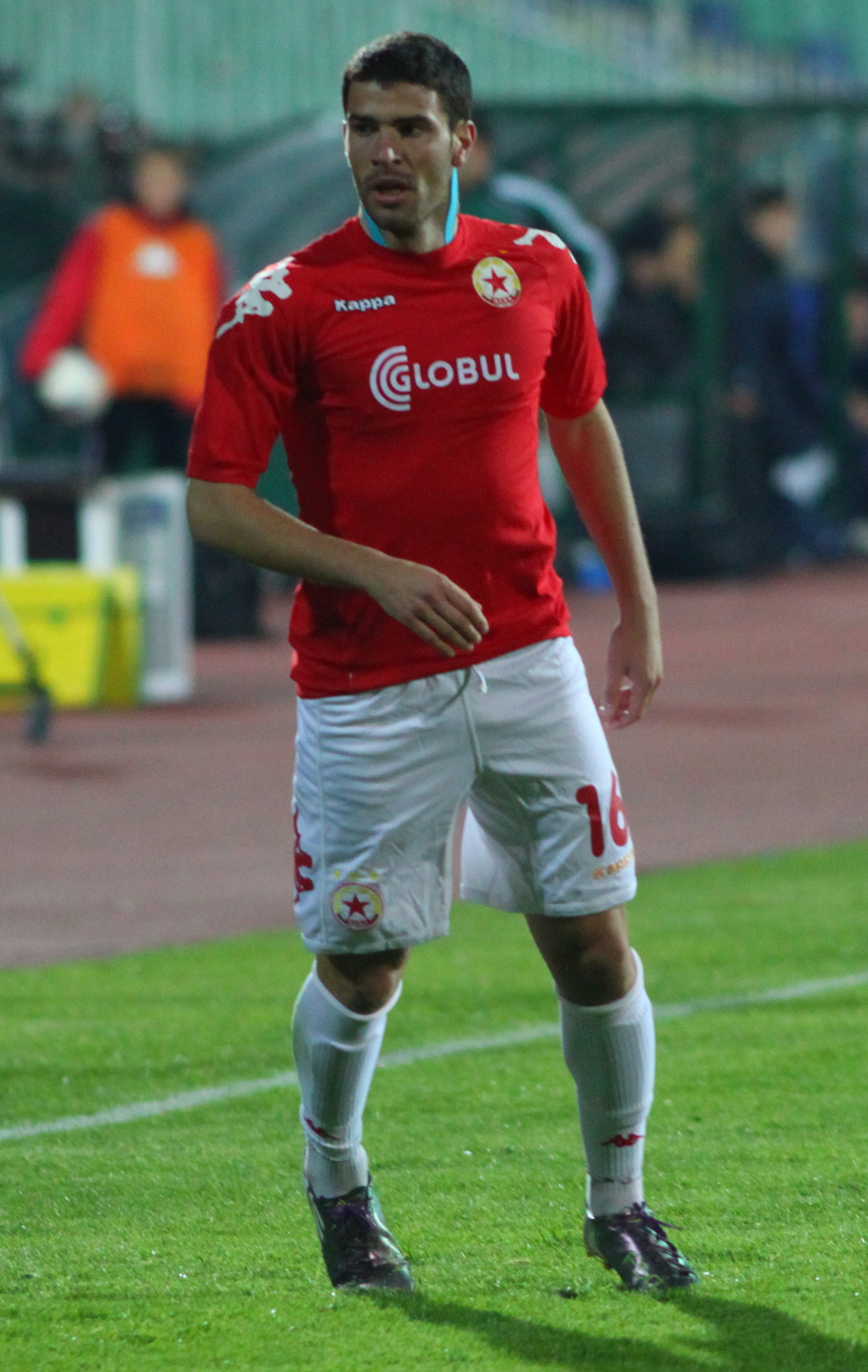

Personal information
- Full name: Aleksandar Dimitrov Yakimov
- Date of birth: 27 April 1989 (age 37)
- Place of birth: Klyuch, Bulgaria
- Height: 1.81 m (5 ft 11 in)
- Position: Midfielder

Team information
- Current team: Belasitsa Petrich
- Number: 55

Senior career*
Years	Team	Apps	(Gls)
2008–2011	Pirin Blagoevgrad	44	(2)
2009	→ Bansko (loan)	14	(1)
2011–2013	CSKA Sofia	13	(0)
2012–2013	→ Botev Vratsa (loan)	28	(3)
2013–2015	Lokomotiv Plovdiv	42	(0)
2015	Pirin Blagoevgrad	9	(0)
2016	Belasitsa Petrich	12	(3)
2016	Vereya	4	(0)
2016–2017	Tsarsko Selo	19	(1)
2017–2026	Vihren Sandanski	?	(41)
2026–	Belasitsa Petrich	3	(0)

International career
2008	Bulgaria U21	1	(0)
- * Club domestic league appearances and goals as of 24 May 2026

Aleksandar Dimitrov Yakimov (Bulgarian: Александър Димитров Якимов; born 27 April 1989) is a Bulgarian footballer who plays as a midfielder for Belasitsa Petrich.

== Career ==
Yakimov started to play football in local club Pirin. During the 2007–08 season he played with Pirin in the Bulgarian amateur division. Pirin took first place and won promotion to the "B" professional football group. On 9 August 2008, Yakimov made his debut in professional football in a match against Botev Krivodol.

On 4 July 2017, Yakimov joined Belasitsa Petrich but was with the team only for pre-season training. On 1 August 2017, he signed with Vihren Sandanski.

In October 2008 the Bulgarian national under-21 coach Ivan Kolev called Yakimov up to the Bulgaria national under-21 football team for friendly matches with Greece U21 and Macedonia U21.
