= Tihomir Naydenov =

Bulgarian footballer

Personal information
- Full name: Tihomir Nikolaev Naydenov
- Date of birth: 25 March 1986 (age 40)
- Place of birth: Bulgaria
- Height: 1.81 m (5 ft 11 1/2 in)
- Position: Midfielder

Team information
- Current team: Lokomotiv Mezdra

Senior career*
Years	Team	Apps	(Gls)
2009–2015	Botev Vratsa	110	(17)
2015–	Lokomotiv Mezdra	0	(0)
- * Club domestic league appearances and goals as of 30 June 2015

Tihomir Naydenov (Bulgarian: Тихомир Найденов; born 25 March 1986) is a Bulgarian football midfielder who plays for Lokomotiv Mezdra.
