= Marcelo Nicácio =

Brazilian footballer

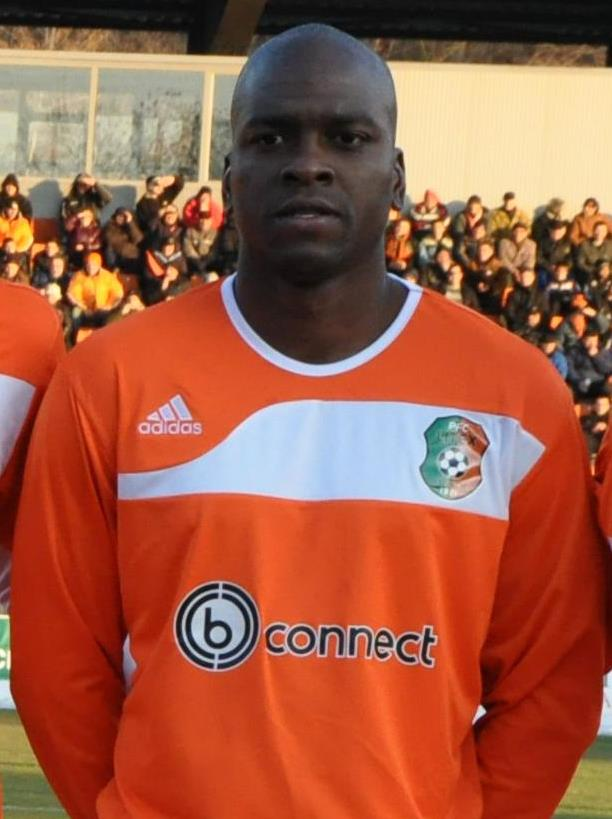

Personal information
- Full name: Marcelo da Paixão Ramos Nicácio
- Date of birth: 5 January 1983 (age 43)
- Place of birth: Salvador, Bahia, Brazil
- Height: 1.78 m (5 ft 10 in)
- Position: Striker

Senior career*
Years	Team	Apps	(Gls)
2003–2004	Bahia		
2005	Skoda Xanthi	4	(0)
2006–2007	Votoraty		
2007–2010	Atlético Mineiro		
2007	→ CRB (loan)		
2008	→ América de Natal (loan)		
2009	→ Fortaleza (loan)	31	(17)
2010	→ Figueirense (loan)	10	(2)
2010–2011	Ceará	54	(22)
2012	Litex Lovech	14	(10)
2012–2013	Vitória	14	(5)
2013	Paysandu	25	(8)
2014	Al-Faisaly	20	(6)
2015–2017	Boavista	15	(3)
2015	→ Boa Esporte (loan)	5	(1)
2016	→ CSA (loan)	10	(3)
2017	Icasa		
2018	Atlético Cearense	15	(5)
2018	Manaus	8	(1)
2018	Santa Helena		
2019	Jacuipense	20	(5)
2019	Maruinense		
2020	Fluminense de Feira	9	(8)
2020	UNIRB		
2021	Vitória das Tabocas	5	(0)
2021	River	3	(1)
2021	Cariri		
- * Club domestic league appearances and goals

Marcelo da Paixão Ramos Nicácio (born 5 January 1983) is a Brazilian former footballer.

== Career ==
In January 2009 Nicácio joined Fortaleza on loan from Atlético Mineiro. In the first half of the year, he scored 13 goals in the Campeonato Cearense. He also completed the season as the Série B's top goal-scorer with 17 goals.

In 2010, he signed for Figueirense and scored 2 goals in 10 matches of Série B.

=== Ceará ===
In September 2010, Nicácio joined Ceará. He made his debut in a 1–1 home draw against Goiás on 20 September, coming on as a substitute for Kempes. He scored his first goal on 2 October, in a 2–2 away draw against Corinthians.

In the first half of 2011, Nicácio scored 16 goals in the Campeonato Cearense and Ceará were crowned champions. He continued scoring as he scored Ceará's opening goal of the Série A match in their 3–0 win over Atlético Mineiro on 7 July. On 10 August, Nicácio scored a last-minute winning goal in a 2–1 home win over São Paulo in their second stage first leg tie of the Copa Sudamericana.

=== Litex Lovech ===
On 8 December 2011, Nicácio signed for Bulgarian A PFG side Litex Lovech. He made his league debut on 3 March 2012 in a 3–0 home win over Vidima-Rakovski, scoring a hat-trick. Week later, he scored a brace against Svetkavitsa at the Dimitar Burkov Stadium. On 14 March, Nicácio scored a penalty in a 2–0 win over Minyor Pernik in the Bulgarian Cup. He continued his fine form scoring the only goal in a 1–0 win against Slavia Sofia on 18 March. However, 37 minutes after his goal, he received his first red card in Bulgarian football.

=== Vitória ===
On 5 July 2012, Nicácio has signed for Brazilian club Vitória.

=== Paysandu ===
On 31 May 2013, Nicácio joined another team from his home country, Paysandu.

== Statistics ==
All stats correct as of 2 April 2013.

Club	Season	Série B		Copa do Brasil		Cearense		Continental		Other		Total	
Club	Season	Apps	Goals	Apps	Goals	Apps	Goals	Apps	Goals	Apps	Goals	Apps	Goals
Fortaleza	2009	31	17	0	0	?	13	—	—	—	—	?	30
Fortaleza	Total	31	17	0	0	?	13	0	0	0	0	?	30
Club	Season	Série B		Copa do Brasil		Catarinense		Continental		Other		Total	
Club	Season	Apps	Goals	Apps	Goals	Apps	Goals	Apps	Goals	Apps	Goals	Apps	Goals
Figueirense	2010	10	2	0	0	0	0	—	—	—	—	10	2
Figueirense	Total	10	2	0	0	0	0	0	0	0	0	10	2
Club	Season	Série A		Copa do Brasil		Cearense		Continental		Other		Total	
Club	Season	Apps	Goals	Apps	Goals	Apps	Goals	Apps	Goals	Apps	Goals	Apps	Goals
Ceará	2010	12	1	0	0	0	0	—	—	—	—	12	1
Ceará	2011	21	5	7	2	21	16	2	1	—	—	51	24
Ceará	Total	33	6	7	2	21	16	2	1	0	0	63	25
Club	Season	A PFG		Bulgarian Cup		———		Continental		Other		Total	
Club	Season	Apps	Goals	Apps	Goals			Apps	Goals	Apps	Goals	Apps	Goals
Litex Lovech	2011–12	14	10	2	1	—	—	—	—	—	—	16	11
Litex Lovech	Total	14	10	2	1	—	—	0	0	0	0	16	11
Club	Season	Série A		Copa do Brasil		Baiano		Continental		Other		Total	
Club	Season	Apps	Goals	Apps	Goals	Apps	Goals	Apps	Goals	Apps	Goals	Apps	Goals
Vitória	2012	9	1	0	0	0	0	—	—	—	—	9	1
Vitória	2013	—	—	0	0	3	4	—	—	8	5	11	9
Vitória	Total	9	1	0	0	3	4	—	—	8	5	20	10

== Honours ==
Fortaleza

- Campeonato Cearense: 2009

Ceará

- Campeonato Cearense: 2011

Vitória

- Campeonato Baiano: 2013

=== Individual ===
- Campeonato Cearense Top scorer: 2009 (with 13 goals)
- Campeonato Brasileiro Série B Top scorer: 2009 (with 17 goals)
- Campeonato Cearense Top scorer: 2011 (with 16 goals)
