= Iliya Iliev =

Bulgarian footballer

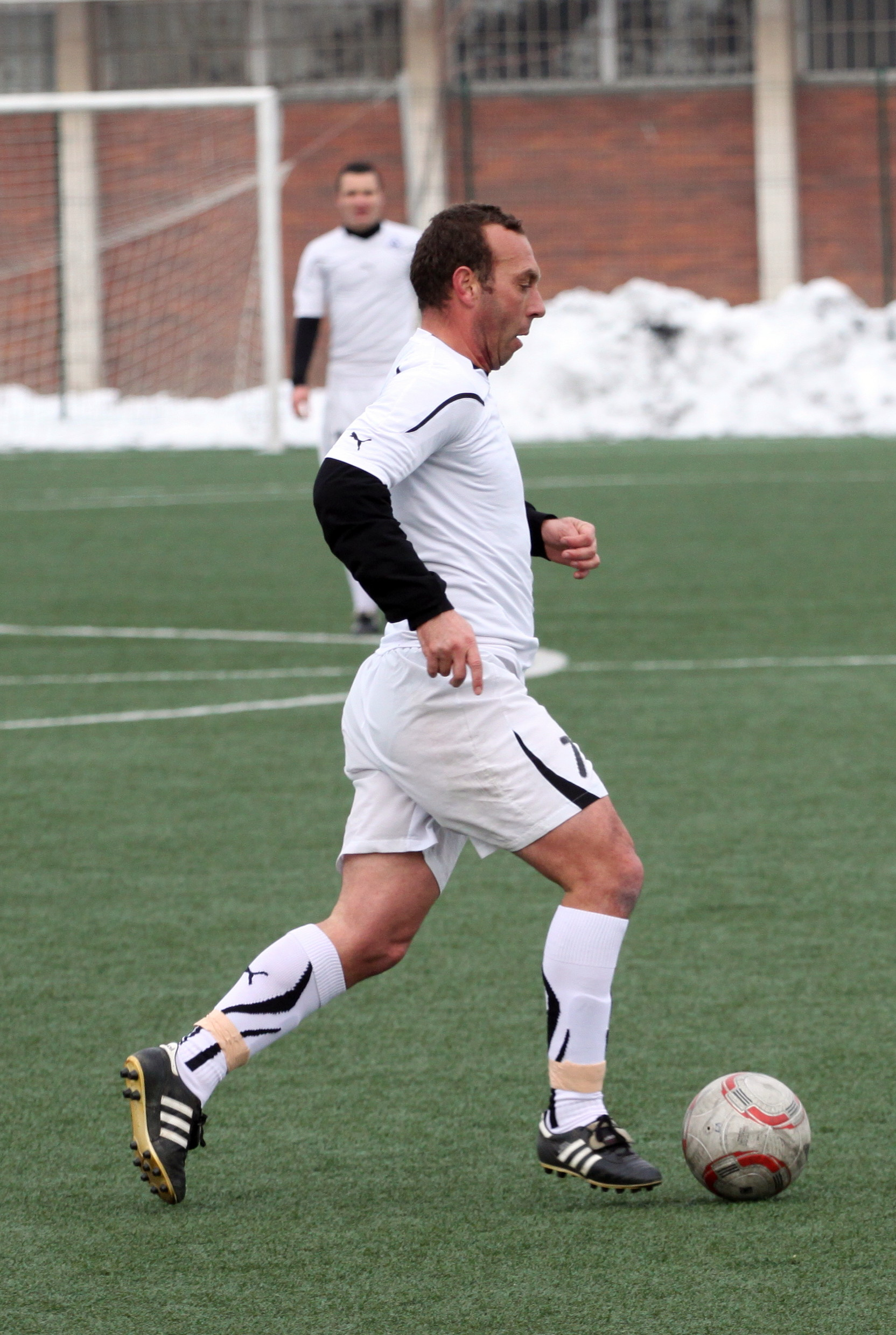

Personal information
- Full name: Iliya Raychev Iliev
- Date of birth: 20 December 1974 (age 51)
- Place of birth: Sofia, Bulgaria
- Height: 1.76 m (5 ft 9 in)
- Position: Midfielder

Senior career*
Years	Team	Apps	(Gls)
1993–2000	Septemvri Sofia	103	(26)
2000–2001	Litex Lovech	10	(0)
2002	Spartak Varna	22	(3)
2003	Terek Grozny	30	(3)
2004–2006	Marek Dupnitsa	66	(4)
2006–2008	Slavia Sofia	59	(7)
2008	Lokomotiv Mezdra	15	(8)
2009–2010	Sliven 2000	28	(1)
2010–2011	Slavia Sofia	33	(3)
2012–2014	Botev Vratsa	68	(15)
Total		434	(70)
- * Club domestic league appearances and goals

Iliya Iliev (Bulgarian: Илия Илиев; born 20 December 1974) is a Bulgarian former footballer who played as a midfielder.

== Career ==
Iliev started his professional career with Septemvri Sofia after coming up through their youth academy. He played a major part in the club's promotion to the A PFG in 1998, after a 37-year exile. In 1998–99 season he made his debut in the top flight, making 23 appearances during the campaign, but Septemvri won just four games and were relegated.

He was sold to Litex Lovech in 2000 for €40,000, winning the Bulgarian Cup a year later. Iliev played only 10 games in the league for Litex. Having failed to break into the first team, he signed for Spartak Varna in early 2002.

In 2003 Iliev joined Russian side Terek Grozny. He became a regular in the Terek first team, scoring three goals in 30 appearances in the Russian First Division. However, at the end of 2003 season in Russia, he returned to Bulgaria and signed for Marek Dupnitsa. In Marek Iliev spent two and a half seasons. He made 66 league appearances and scored 4 league goals.

On 19 July 2006, Iliev signed with Slavia Sofia.

In June 2008, Iliev joined Lokomotiv Mezdra. On 24 October, he scored a hat-trick in a 4–0 league win over Lokomotiv Sofia. He spent a half-season at Lokomotiv, scoring 8 goals for 15 appearances. In December 2008, Iliev signed a three-year contract with Sliven 2000.

In June 2010, his contract with Sliven was terminated and he re-signed for Slavia Sofia. Iliev made his second Slavia debut as a substitute in a 1–0 home loss against Kaliakra Kavarna on 31 July. On 13 March 2011, he scored Slavia's only goal in their 2–1 defeat at Beroe Stara Zagora. During 2010–11 season, Iliev earned 24 appearances in the A PFG. In the first half of the following campaign he scored 2 goals in 9 matches.

On 14 December 2011, Iliev signed with Botev Vratsa. He made his debut on 3 March 2012 in a 1–0 home loss against his former club Slavia. He netted his first goal as he scored Botev's only goal in their 3–1 defeat at Chernomorets Burgas on 22 April. In August 2012, Iliev was announced as Botev's new captain.

== Career statistics ==
Club	Season	League		Cup		Europe		Other		Total	
Club	Season	Apps	Goals	Apps	Goals	Apps	Goals	Apps	Goals	Apps	Goals
Lokomotiv Mezdra	2008–09	15	8	1	0	—		—		16	8
Lokomotiv Mezdra	Total	15	8	1	0	—		—		16	8
Sliven 2000	2008–09	13	0	0	0	—		—		13	0
Sliven 2000	2009–10	15	1	2	0	—		—		17	1
Sliven 2000	Total	28	1	2	0	—		—		30	1
Slavia Sofia	2010–11	24	1	2	0	—		—		26	1
Slavia Sofia	2011–12	9	2	0	0	—		—		9	2
Slavia Sofia	Total	33	3	2	0	—		—		35	3
Botev Vratsa	2011–12	15	3	0	0	–		–		15	3
Botev Vratsa	2012–13	29	7	0	0	–		–		29	7
Botev Vratsa	Total	44	10	0	0	—		—		44	10

== Honours ==
Litex Lovech

- Bulgarian Cup: 2000–01
