= Lachezar Stanchev =

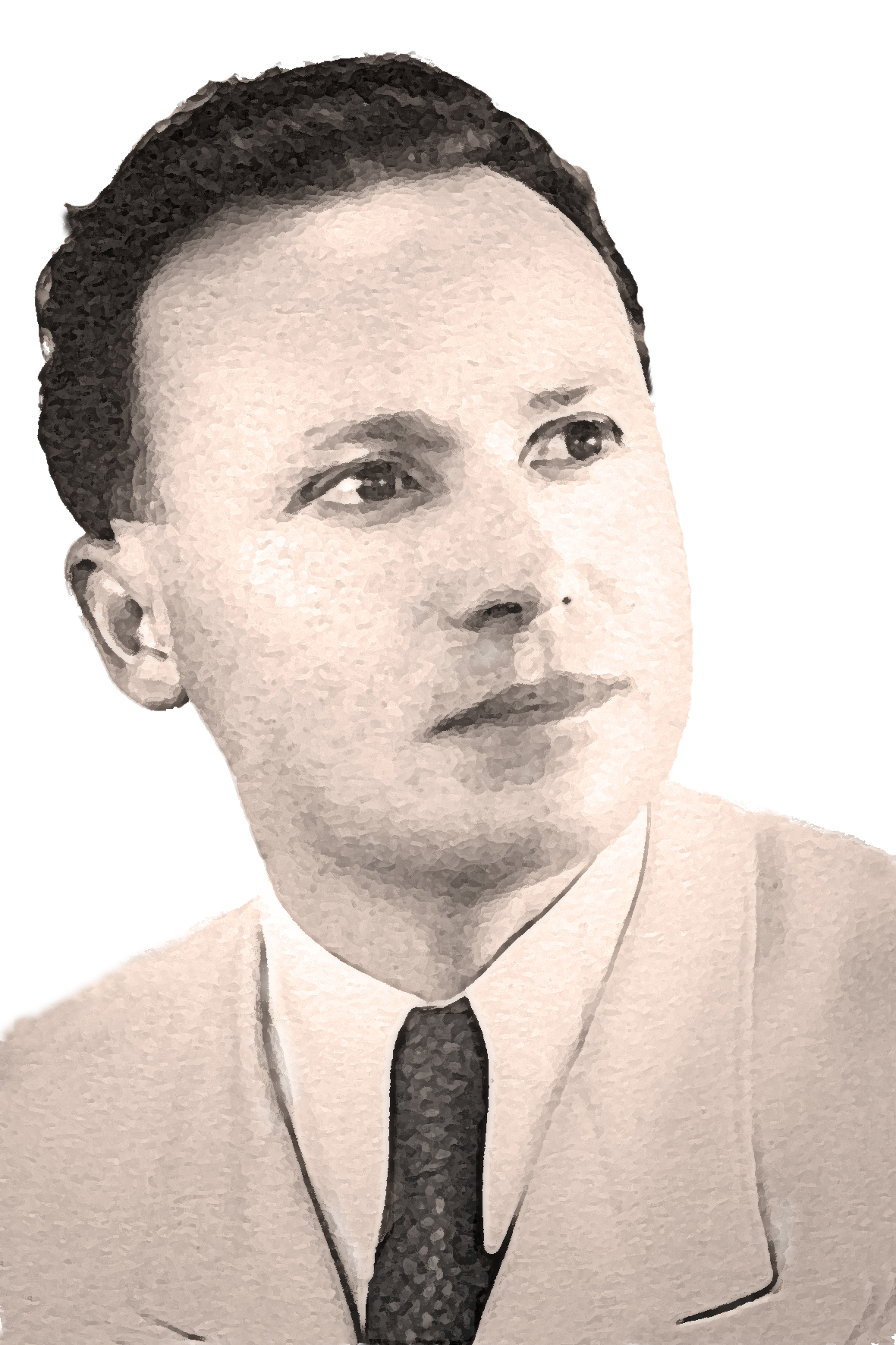
Latchezar Stantchev

Latchezar Stantchev (Bulgarian: Лъчезар Станчев) is a Bulgarian poet who first became well-known in the 1930s. He is also a well-known translator, journalist, and publisher of children's magazines. He was born on September 12, 1908, in the resort town of Varshetz, located in North-west Bulgaria. He died on March 13, 1992, in Sofia. Latchezar Stantchev graduated from Sofia University with a major in French Philology and specialized in French Literature at the Sorbonne in Paris from 1937 to 1939. While in Paris, he was the correspondent of the Bulgarian newspaper Zarya. He was the founder and general editor of the Slaveyche children's magazine (1957-1968), 120,000 issues of which were published monthly.

== Short bibliography ==
- Bezshumni dni (Silent days), 1930
- Prolet na boulevarda (Printemps sur le boulevard), 1933
- Hora po strehite (Gens sur les toits), 1935
- Zemya pod slantse (Terre sous le soleil), 1939
- Vlubeni bulevardi (Les boulevards), 1993
- Paris pod slantse (Paris sous le soleil), 1998
