= Lachezar Manchev =

Bulgarian footballer

Personal information
- Full name: Lachezar Stanislavov Manchev
- Date of birth: 23 January 1989 (age 37)
- Place of birth: Sofia, Bulgaria
- Position: Midfielder

Team information
- Current team: Akademik Sofia
- Number: 6

Youth career
- Levski Sofia

Senior career*
| Years | Team | Apps | (Gls) |
| 2008–2009 | Levski Sofia | 3 | (0) |
| 2009– | Akademik Sofia | 10 | (1) |
- * Club domestic league appearances and goals as of 11 June 2011

Lachezar Manchev (Bulgarian: Лъчезар Манчев) (born on 23 January 1989 in Sofia) is a Bulgarian footballer currently playing for Akademik Sofia as a midfielder.

== Career ==
=== Youth career ===
Manchev comes directly from Levski Sofia's. Anyway, after the creating of the second team of Levski, he became a part of the new-formed PFC Levski Sofia B. During the first season of the 'B' league, Levski became a champion.

=== The road to Czech Republic ===
Bulgaria Under-19 Team started the campaign leading to the 2008 UEFA European Under-19 Football Championship in October 2007. First, they've played in Group 9 against Turkey (0–2), Denmark (1–0, goal by Mihail Aleksandrov) and the Faroe Islands (0-0). Then the team was seeded in the Group 3, with Island, Norway and Israel being the other participants in the group. Bulgaria finished at the top of the Group 3, after three wins against Island (2–0 on 2 May, goals by Momchil Cvetanov and Zehirov), Norway (2–0 on 29 April, goals by Mihail Aleksandrov and Ismail Isa Mustafa) and Israel (1–0 on 27 April, goal by Momchil Cvetanov).
