= Saša Živec =

Slovenian footballer (born 1991)

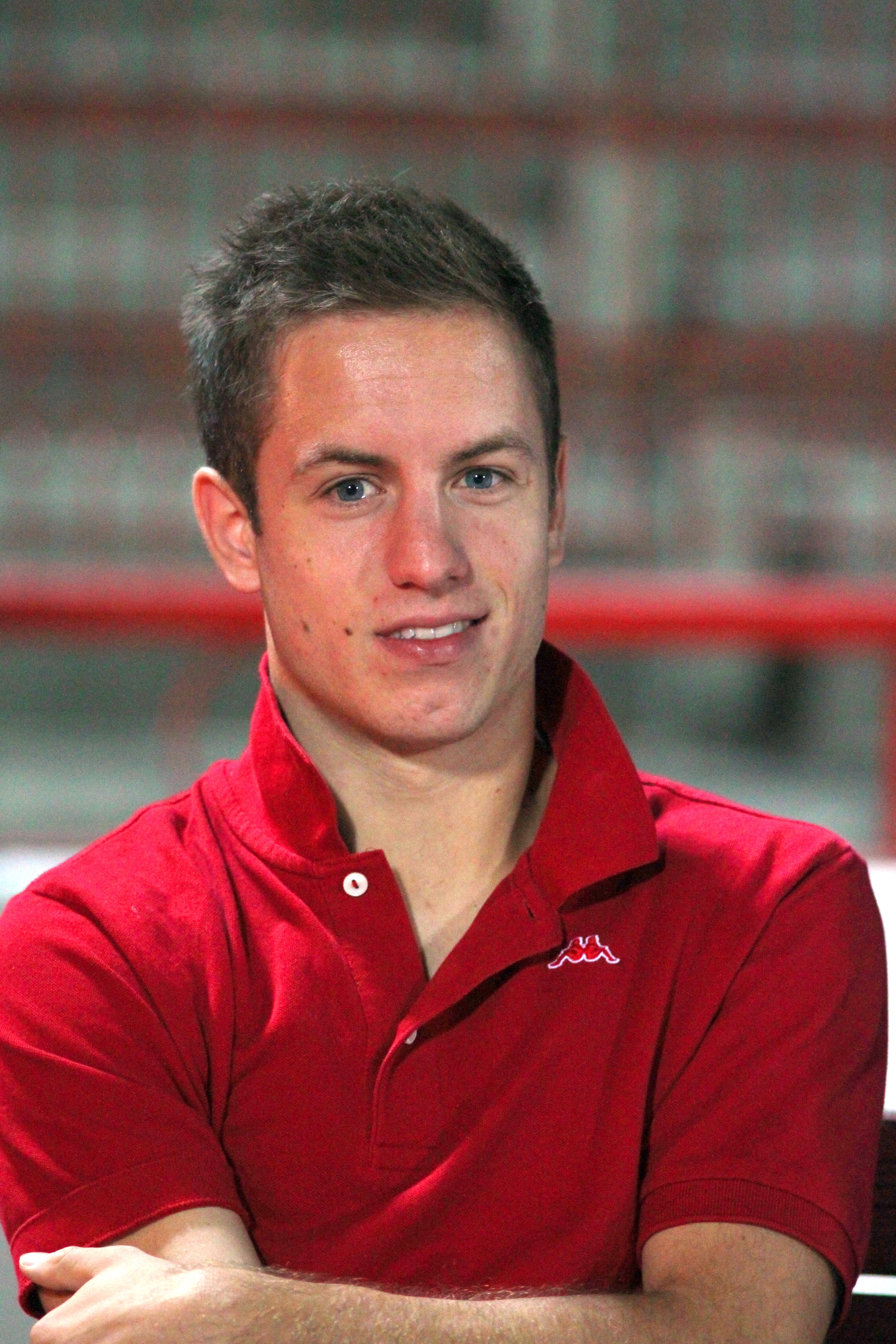

Personal information
- Full name: Saša Aleksander Živec
- Date of birth: 2 April 1991 (age 35)
- Place of birth: Šempeter pri Gorici, SFR Yugoslavia
- Height: 1.70 m (5 ft 7 in)
- Position: Winger

Youth career
- –2007: Gorica
- 2007–2009: Bilje
- 2009–2010: Primorje

Senior career*
Years	Team	Apps	(Gls)
2009–2011	Primorje	48	(2)
2011	CSKA Sofia	3	(0)
2012–2014	Domžale	27	(10)
2013–2014	→ Gorica (loan)	31	(6)
2014–2018	Piast Gliwice	102	(15)
2017	→ Latina Calcio 1932 (loan)	0	(0)
2018–2019	Omonia	12	(0)
2019–2023	Zagłębie Lubin	76	(14)
2022–2023	Zagłębie Lubin II	4	(0)
2023–2024	Wieczysta Kraków	18	(3)

International career
2009	Slovenia U19	1	(0)
2010–2011	Slovenia U21	2	(0)
2020	Slovenia	2	(0)
- * Club domestic league appearances and goals as of 9 June 2024

Saša Aleksander Živec (born 2 April 1991) is a Slovenian professional footballer who plays as a winger.

== Club career ==
=== Primorje ===
On 16 July 2010, Živec made his Slovenian PrvaLiga debut for Primorje in a 4–1 away defeat to Koper. On 29 August 2010, he scored his first league goal and Primorje's fifth in a 5–1 home win over Olimpija Ljubljana. Živec netted his second goal of the season as he scored the winning strike in a 1–0 away victory over Rudar Velenje on 7 May 2011. He made 31 league appearances during the 2010–11 season, but Primorje finished last and was relegated to the Slovenian Second League.

=== CSKA Sofia ===
On 14 June 2011, Živec joined CSKA Sofia on a three-year contract for an undisclosed fee believed to be around €100,000. On 16 July 2011, he scored his first goal for CSKA Sofia in a friendly match against Cracovia Krakow. Živec made his competitive debut for the club on 30 July 2011, appearing as a substitute in a 3–1 win in the 2011 Bulgarian Supercup against Litex Lovech. He spent most of his time with CSKA on the bench and his contract was terminated by mutual consent on 29 November 2011.

=== Domžale ===
After breaking his contract with CSKA Sofia, Živec returned to his native Slovenia and on 9 February 2012 joined Domžale on a two-and-a-half-year contract. Živec made his competitive debut for the club on 10 March 2012 in a 2–1 defeat against Maribor and also scored his debut goal for the team. On 17 March 2012, Živec scored again in a 2–1 home defeat against his former youth club Gorica. Just four days later he scored again, this time in a 4–3 victory over Mura 05. He opened the 2012–13 season with a 2–1 away victory over Olimpija Ljubljana, in which he scored both goals for his team.

=== Omonia ===
On 4 July 2018, Živec signed for Cypriot First Division club AC Omonia.

=== Zagłębie Lubin ===
On 27 June 2019, Živec returned to Ekstraklasa by signing with Zagłębie Lubin. He made his debut for the club on 26 July 2019 in a 1–0 defeat to Górnik Zabrze. He scored his first goal for Zagłębie on 10 August 2019 against Arka Gdynia.

=== Wieczysta Kraków ===
On 16 August 2023, Polish III liga side Wieczysta Kraków announced the signing of Živec on a one-year contract, with an option for another year. He was released at the end of his contract on 30 June 2024.

== International career ==
On 3 September 2020, Živec made his senior international debut for Slovenia against Greece in the 2020–21 UEFA Nations League.

== Honours ==
Wieczysta Kraków

- III liga, group IV: 2023–24
