= Maxime Josse =

French footballer (born 1987)

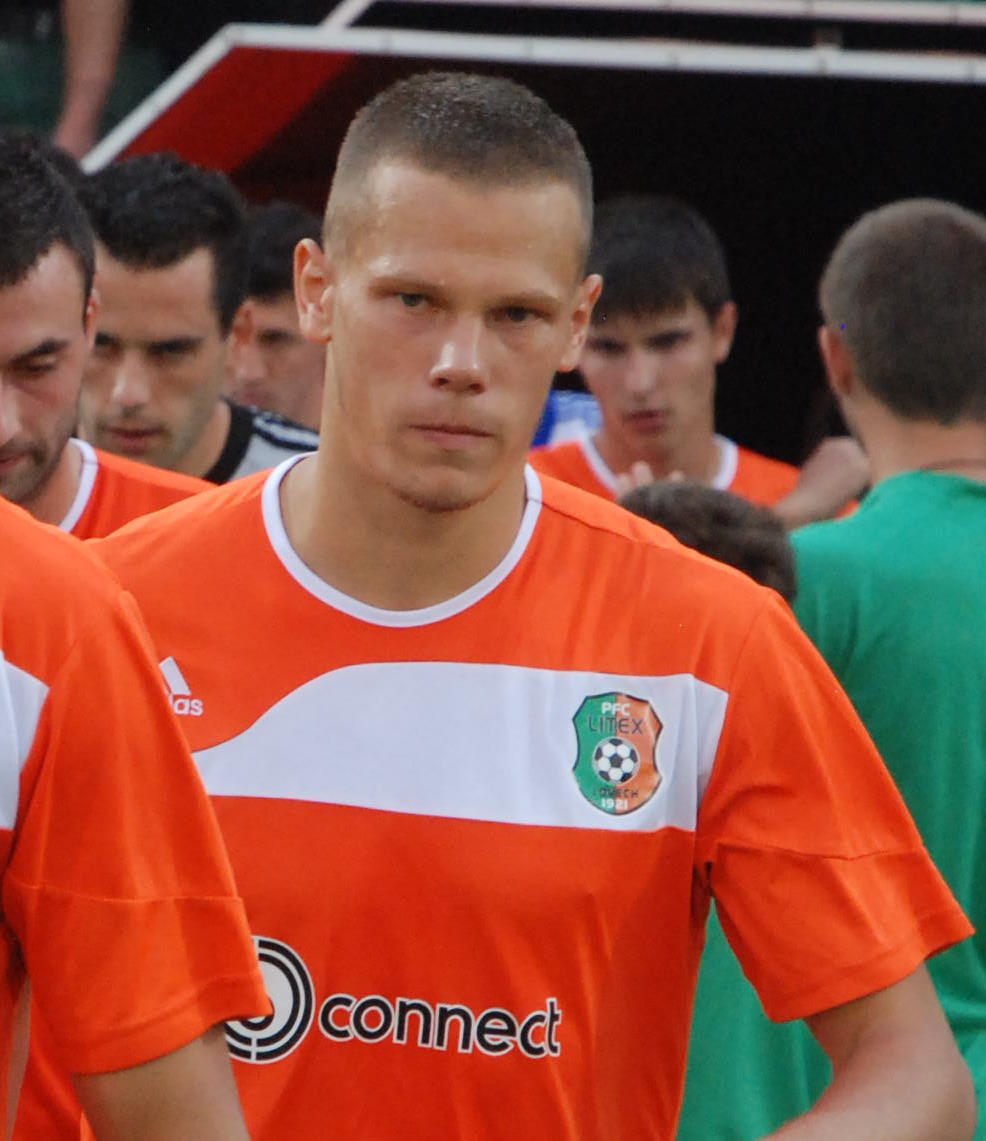
- Josse with Litex Lovech

Personal information
- Date of birth: 21 March 1987 (age 39)
- Place of birth: Saint-Quentin, France
- Height: 1.87 m (6 ft 2 in)
- Position: Centre back

Team information
- Current team: La Chaux-de-Fonds
- Number: 5

Youth career
- 2004–2005: Sochaux

Senior career*
Years	Team	Apps	(Gls)
2005–2011	Sochaux	39	(0)
2006–2007	→ Brest (loan)	20	(0)
2008–2009	→ Angers (loan)	6	(0)
2011–2012	Litex Lovech	19	(1)
2012–2013	Bnei Sakhnin	17	(0)
2013	Panthrakikos	12	(0)
2014	Kalloni	4	(0)
2015	Inter Turku	0	(0)
2015–2016	Belfort	26	(0)
2016–2017	CA Bastia	30	(0)
2017	FC Villefranche	6	(0)
2018–	La Chaux-de-Fonds	10	(1)

International career
2004–2005	France U18		
2005–2006	France U19		
2006–2007	France U21	3	(0)
Medal record
Men's football
Representing France
UEFA European Under-17 Championship
Winner	2004 France
- * Club domestic league appearances and goals as of 17 May 2018

Maxime Josse (born 21 March 1987 in Saint-Quentin) is a French football player who plays for FC La Chaux-de-Fonds.

Josse was part of the France national youth football team that won the 2004 UEFA European Under-17 Football Championship.

== Career ==
=== In France ===
Josse began his career at Sochaux breaking through the Youth Academy and made his Ligue 1 debut in a 2–2 away draw against Paris Saint-Germain on 14 May 2005. In his first two seasons he earned only 9 appearances and for the 2006–07 season he was loaned out to Stade Brestois in the Ligue 2.

Josse's debut for Stade Brestois came on 8 September 2006 in a 0–0 home draw against Montpellier HSC. By the end of his loan at Brestois, he had made 20 league appearances.

After spending the 2007–08 season at Sochaux, on 28 August 2009, Josse signed for Angers SCO on a season-long loan.

=== Litex Lovech ===
On 6 July 2011, Josse joined Bulgarian side Litex Lovech on a three-year contract, taking squad number 6, after it was vacated by Ivaylo Petkov.

== Career statistics ==
As of 1 July 2011

Appearances and goals by club, season and competition
Club	Season	League		Cup		Europe		Total	
Club	Season	Apps	Goals	Apps	Goals	Apps	Goals	Apps	Goals
Sochaux-Montbéliard	2004–05	3	0	0	0	–	–	3	0
Sochaux-Montbéliard	2005–06	6	0	0	0	–	–	6	0
Sochaux-Montbéliard	Total	9	0	0	0	0	0	9	0
Stade Brestois	2006–07	20	0	0	0	–	–	20	0
Sochaux-Montbéliard	2007–08	12	0	1	0	0	0	13	0
Angers SCO	2008–09	6	0	0	0	–	–	6	0
Sochaux-Montbéliard	2009–10	7	0	2	0	–	–	9	0
Sochaux-Montbéliard	2010–11	11	0	1	0	–	–	12	0
Sochaux-Montbéliard	Total	18	0	3	0	0	0	21	0
Litex Lovech	2011–12	0	0	0	0	0	0	0	0
Career totals		65	0	4	0	0	0	69	0
