= Bernard Onanga Itoua =

French footballer (born 1988)

Onanga Itoua
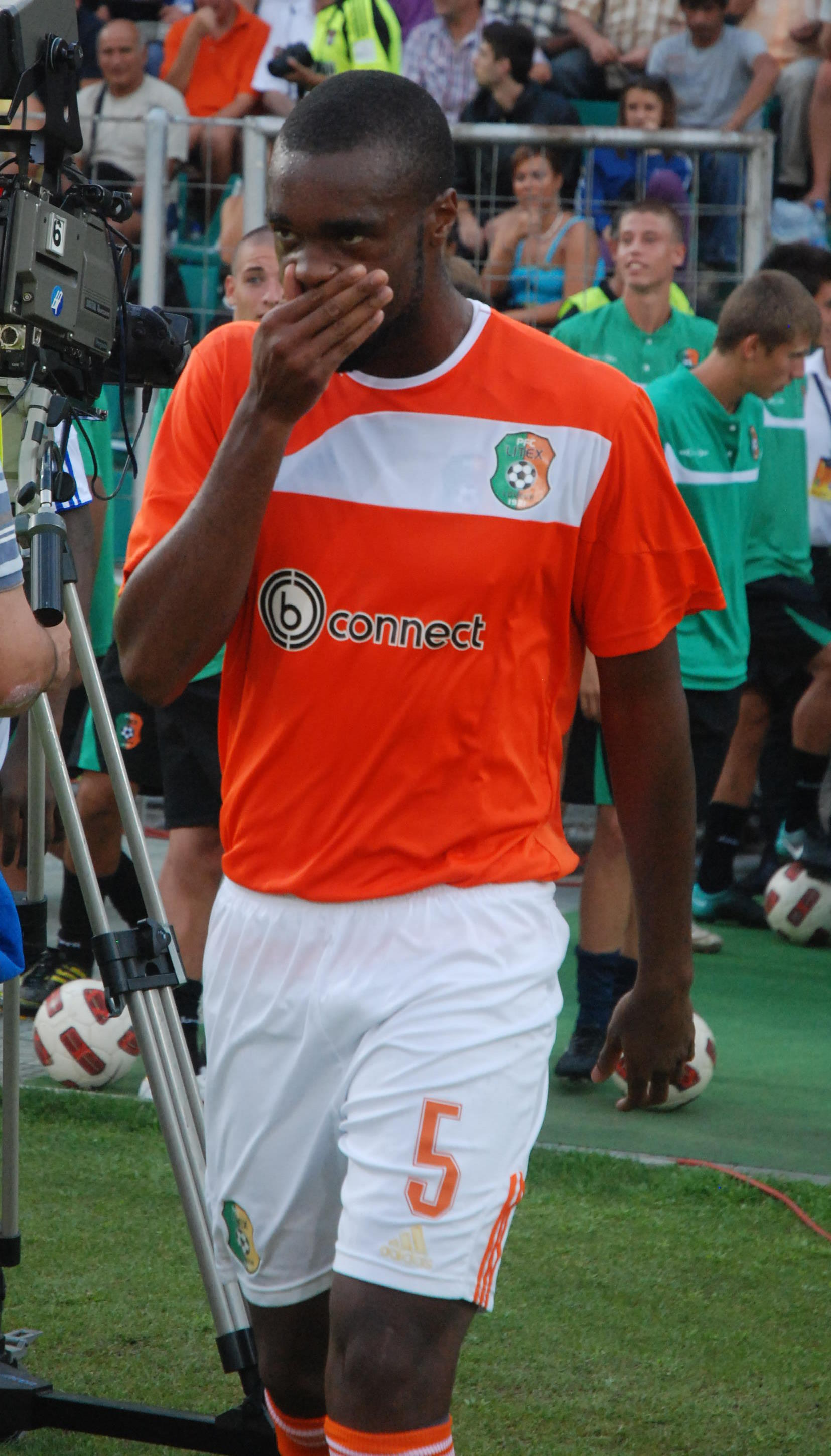

Personal information
- Full name: Bernard Onanga Itoua
- Date of birth: September 7, 1988 (age 38)
- Place of birth: Blois, France
- Height: 1.87 m (6 ft 2 in)
- Position: Defender

Youth career
- 2003–2008: Auxerre

Senior career*
Years	Team	Apps	(Gls)
2008–2010	Auxerre B	38	(2)
2010–2011	Auxerre	2	(0)
2011–2012	Litex Lovech	21	(0)
2012–2013	Hapoel Ramat Gan	29	(3)
2013–2014	SV Elversberg	17	(0)
2014–2016	Platanias	37	(1)
2017	Gaz Metan Mediaș	5	(0)
2017–2018	Alki Oroklini	23	(0)
- * Club domestic league appearances and goals as of 8 July 2018

Bernard Onanga Itoua (born 7 September 1988) is a French former footballer who played as a defender.

On 22 July 2013, he joined SV Elversberg on a three-year contract.

He holds both French and Congolese nationalities.

== Honours ==
- Israel State Cup: 2013
