= Célio Codó =

Brazilian footballer (born 1987)

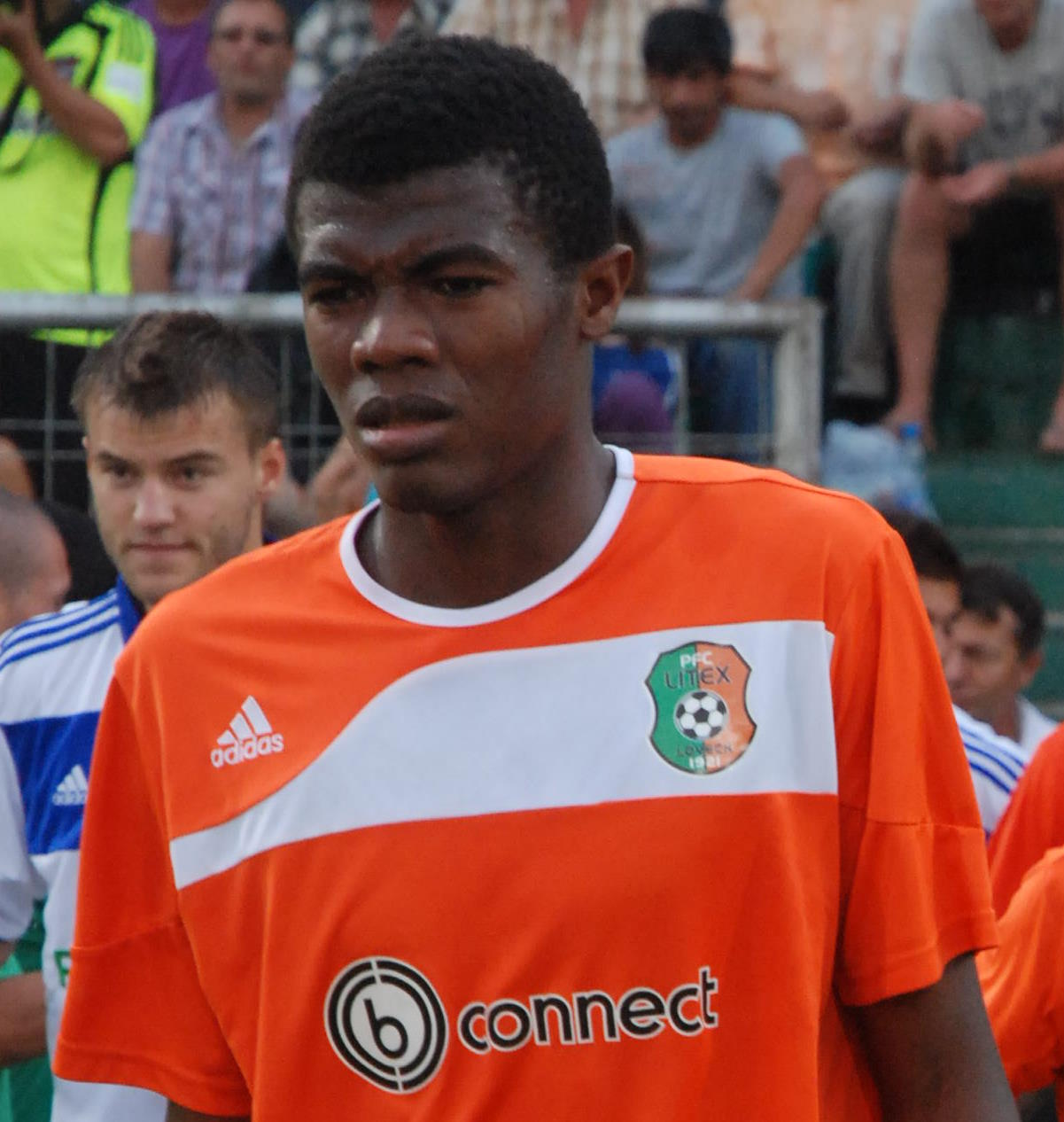

Personal information
- Full name: Célio Luis da Sousa Bispo
- Date of birth: 7 October 1987 (age 39)
- Place of birth: Codó, Brazil
- Height: 1.91 m (6 ft 3 in)
- Position: Forward

Team information
- Current team: Iporá

Senior career*
Years	Team	Apps	(Gls)
2009–2014	Sampaio Corrêa	32	(14)
2011	→ Santo André (loan)	11	(1)
2011	→ Litex Lovech (loan)	6	(3)
2014	→ Mixto (loan)	0	(0)
2015	Parauapebas	1	(2)
2015–2016	Ríver	7	(1)
2016	Vitória da Conquista	3	(0)
2016–2017	Al-Dhaid	?	(?)
2018–	Iporá	0	(0)
- * Club domestic league appearances and goals as of 12 January 2016

Célio Luis da Sousa Bispo (born 7 October 1987), commonly known as Célio Codó, is a Brazilian footballer, who plays as a forward for Iporá.

== Career ==
In season 2009 Célio Codó scored 3 goals in four games for Sampaio Corrêa in the Campeonato Brasileiro Série C, but his team finished last in the group A and relegated to Série D. In the next year he scored 6 goals in 9 games for Sampaio Corrêa in the Série D. Following the 2010 Campeonato Maranhense in which Célio scored 4 goals, the club were crowned champions.

On 5 January 2011, he signed for Santo André on a four-month loan. Codó earned 11 appearances for the team in the Campeonato Paulista, scoring one goal in a 2–2 home draw against Oeste on 19 March. He also scored twice in the matches of the Copa do Brasil against Naviraiense and his previously team Sampaio Corrêa.

On 8 June 2011, Codó transferred to Bulgarian side Litex Lovech together with his Sampaio Corrêa teammate Thiago Miracema on a season-long loan. In 2016 he signed a contract with Vitória da Conquista, but saw limited playing time for the team.

== Club statistics ==
Updated 1 December 2013

Club	Season	Brasileirão		Maranhense		Copa do Brasil		Total	
Club	Season	Apps	Goals	Apps	Goals	Apps	Goals	Apps	Goals
Sampaio Corrêa	2009	4	3	?	?	0	0	4	3
Sampaio Corrêa	2010	9	6	?	?	1	0	10	6
Sampaio Corrêa	Total	13	9	?	?	1	0	14	9
		Brasileirão		Paulista A1		Copa do Brasil		Total	
Santo André	2011	0	0	11	1	4	2	15	3
Santo André	Total	0	0	11	1	4	2	15	3
		A PFG		Bulgarian Cup		Europe		Total	
Litex Lovech	2011–12	6	3	1	0	4	0	11	3
Litex Lovech	Total	6	3	1	0	4	0	11	3
		Brasileirão		Maranhense		Copa do Brasil		Total	
Sampaio Corrêa	2012	13	4	0	0	1	0	14	4
Sampaio Corrêa	2013	4	1	0	0	0	0	4	1
Sampaio Corrêa	Total	17	5	0	0	1	0	18	5

== Honours ==
=== Club ===
Sampaio Corrêa

- Campeonato Maranhense (1): 2010
