= Thiago Miracema =

Brazilian footballer

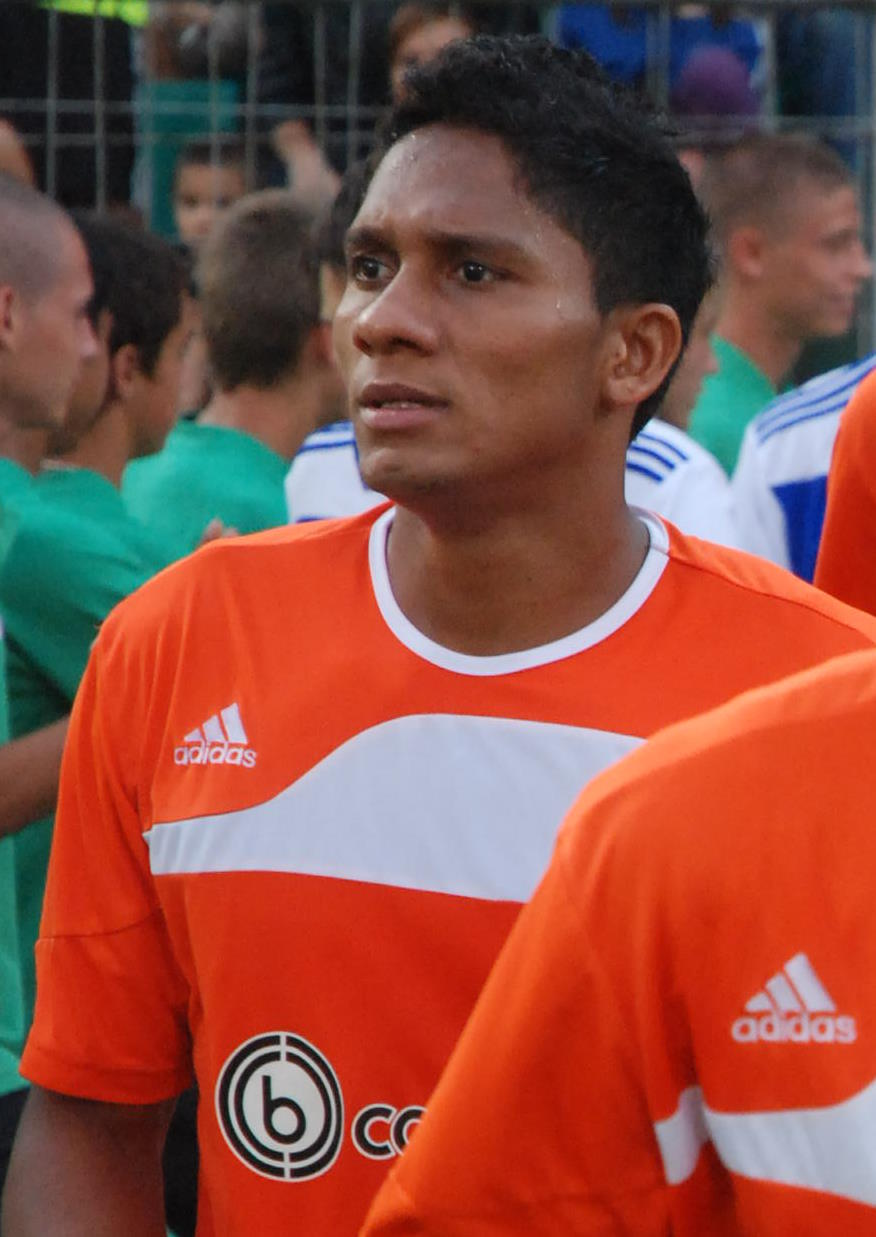

Personal information
- Full name: Thiago de Sousa Bezerra
- Date of birth: 8 December 1987 (age 38)
- Place of birth: Miracema do Tocantins, Brazil
- Height: 1.73 m (5 ft 8 in)
- Position: Left winger

Team information
- Current team: Brasiliense

Senior career*
Years	Team	Apps	(Gls)
2009–2014	Sampaio Corrêa	13	(3)
2010	→ Vila Nova (loan)	3	(0)
2011	→ São José (loan)	9	(1)
2011–2012	→ Litex Lovech (loan)	19	(3)
2013	→ Montana (loan)	10	(0)
2013	→ Bragantino (loan)	2	(0)
2014	Ravan Baku	12	(3)
2014	Icasa	1	(0)
2015–2016	Gama	3	(0)
2016–	Brasiliense	0	(0)
- * Club domestic league appearances and goals as of 20 December 2015

Thiago de Sousa Bezerra (born 8 December 1987 in Miracema do Tocantins), commonly known as Thiago Miracema, is a Brazilian footballer, who plays as a winger for Costa Rica.

== Career ==
In the winter of 2011, Miracema signed for São José on a four-month's loan. He made his Campeonato Gaúcho debut on 16 January, in a 2–2 away draw against Internacional.

On 8 June 2011, Miracema transferred to Litex Lovech together with his Sampaio Corrêa teammate Célio Codó on a season-long loan. He played for PFC Montana during the second half of the 2012/2013 A PFG season, but returned to his country following the team's relegation to the second division.

In January 2014, Miracema signed an 18-month contract with Ravan Baku in the Azerbaijan Premier League. Following Ravan Baku's relegation to the Azerbaijan First Division, Miracema signed for Campeonato Brasileiro Série B side Icasa. In January 2016, he joined Brasiliense.

== Club statistics ==
As of 19 May 2014

Club	Season	Brasileirão		Maranhense		Copa do Brasil		Total	
Club	Season	Apps	Goals	Apps	Goals	Apps	Goals	Apps	Goals
Sampaio Corrêa	2009	7	0	?	?	0	0	7	0
Sampaio Corrêa	2010	4	2	?	?	1	0	5	2
Sampaio Corrêa	Total	11	2	?	?	1	0	12	2
		Brasileirão		Goiano		Copa do Brasil		Total	
Vila Nova	2010	3	0	0	0	0	0	3	0
Vila Nova	Total	3	0	0	0	0	0	3	0
		Brasileirão		Gaucho 1		Copa do Brasil		Total	
São José	2011	0	0	9	1	1	0	10	1
São José	Total	0	0	9	1	1	0	10	1
		A PFG		Bulgarian Cup		Europe		Total	
Litex Lovech	2011–12	19	3	2	2	4	0	25	5
Litex Lovech	Total	19	3	2	2	4	0	25	5
		Brasileirão		Maranhense		Copa do Brasil		Total	
Sampaio Corrêa	2012	2	1					2	1
Sampaio Corrêa	Total	2	1					2	1
		A PFG		Bulgarian Cup		Europe		Total	
Montana	2012–13	10	0	0	0	0	0	10	0
Montana	Total	10	0	0	0	0	0	10	0
		Brasileirão		Paulista		Copa do Brasil		Total	
Bragantino	2013	2	0					2	0
Bragantino	Total	2	0					2	0
		APL		Azerbaijan Cup		Europe		Total	
Ravan Baku	2013–14	12	3	3	1	0	0	15	4
Ravan Baku	Total	12	3	3	1	0	0	15	4

== Honours ==
=== Club ===
Sampaio Corrêa

- Campeonato Maranhense (1): 2010
