= Nikolay Bodurov =

Bulgarian footballer

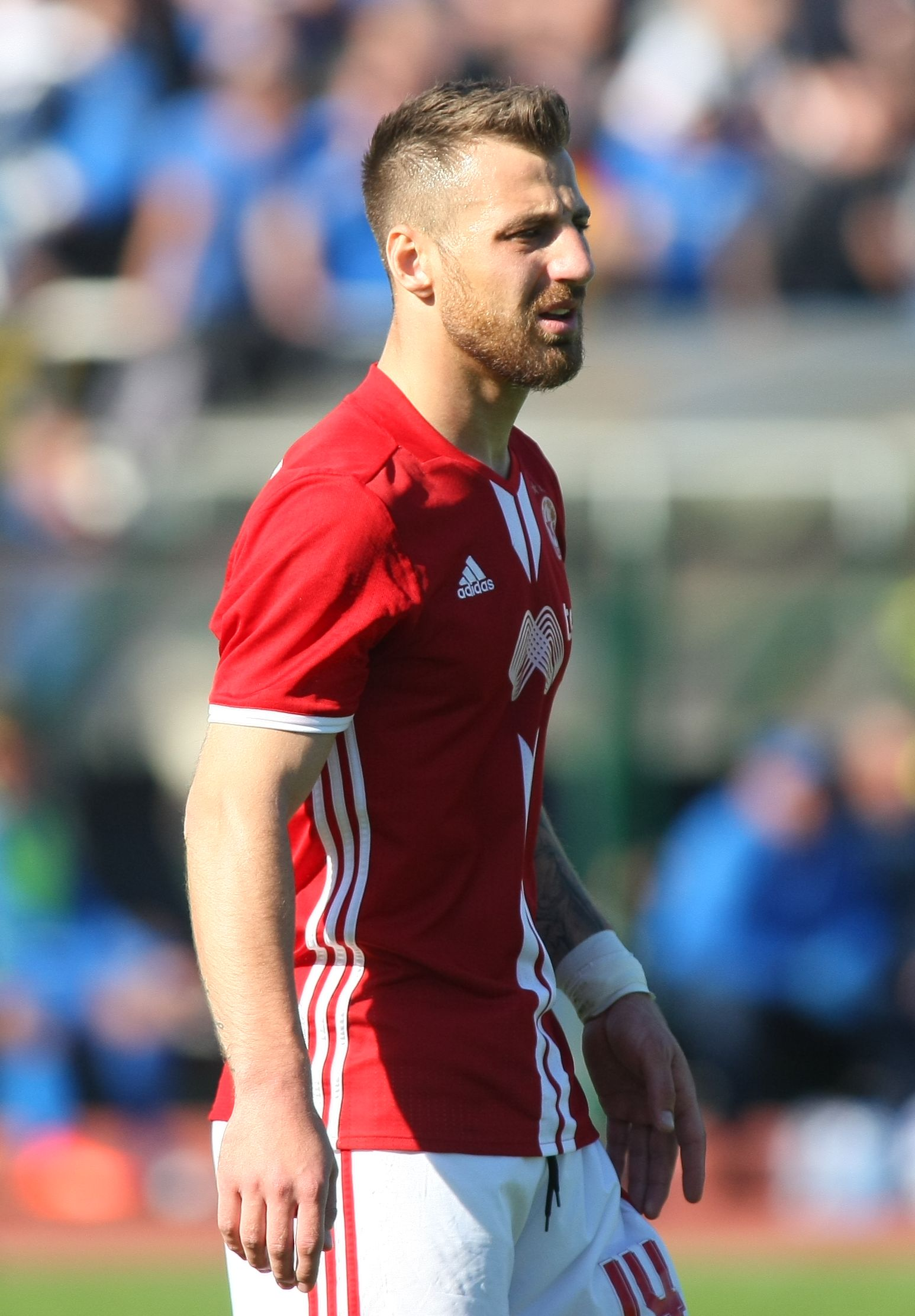

Personal information
- Full name: Nikolay Georgiev Bodurov
- Date of birth: 30 May 1986 (age 40)
- Place of birth: Blagoevgrad, Bulgaria
- Height: 1.82 m (5 ft 11 1/2 in)
- Position: Centre-back

Senior career*
Years	Team	Apps	(Gls)
2004–2009	Pirin Blagoevgrad	104	(1)
2009–2014	Litex Lovech	109	(8)
2014–2016	Fulham	41	(1)
2016	→ Midtjylland (loan)	15	(0)
2017–2019	CSKA Sofia	95	(3)
2020	Esteghlal	1	(0)
2020–2026	Pirin Blagoevgrad	116	(1)
Total		480	(14)

International career
2010–2019	Bulgaria	50	(2)
- * Club domestic league appearances and goals as of 31 May 2026

Nikolay Georgiev Bodurov (Bulgarian: Николай Георгиев Бодуров; born 30 May 1986) is a Bulgarian professional footballer who plays for Pirin Blagoevgrad and the Bulgaria national team. Bodurov plays mainly as a centre back but has also played as a right back on some occasions.

He started his professional career at his hometown club Pirin Blagoevgrad, playing five seasons before moving to Litex Lovech in 2009, with whom he won two league titles. In 2014, he signed with Fulham for a fee in the region of €1 million and then spent time on loan at Midtjylland during the 2015–16 season. In August 2016, his contract with Fulham was cancelled by mutual consent.

Internationally, Bodurov made his debut for Bulgaria in 2010.

== Career ==
=== Pirin Blagoevgrad ===
Born in Blagoevgrad, Bodurov started to play football at early age with Pirin 1922. He made his way through the youth ranks at the club before making his first team debut on 8 August 2004 against Shumen, when he was only 18 years old. Bodurov quickly established himself in the Pirin 1922 first-team. He earned 29 league appearances in 2004–05 season and helped the team to win promotion to A Group.

Bodurov scored his only goal for Pirin during a 2007–08 season. On 27 October 2007, he scored a last-minute goal to secure a 1–0 away win over Vidima-Rakovski.

In the 2008–09 season with the team, he qualified for the final of Bulgarian Cup. Bodurov played in 125 matches at the club of Blagoevgrad until 2009.

=== Litex Lovech ===
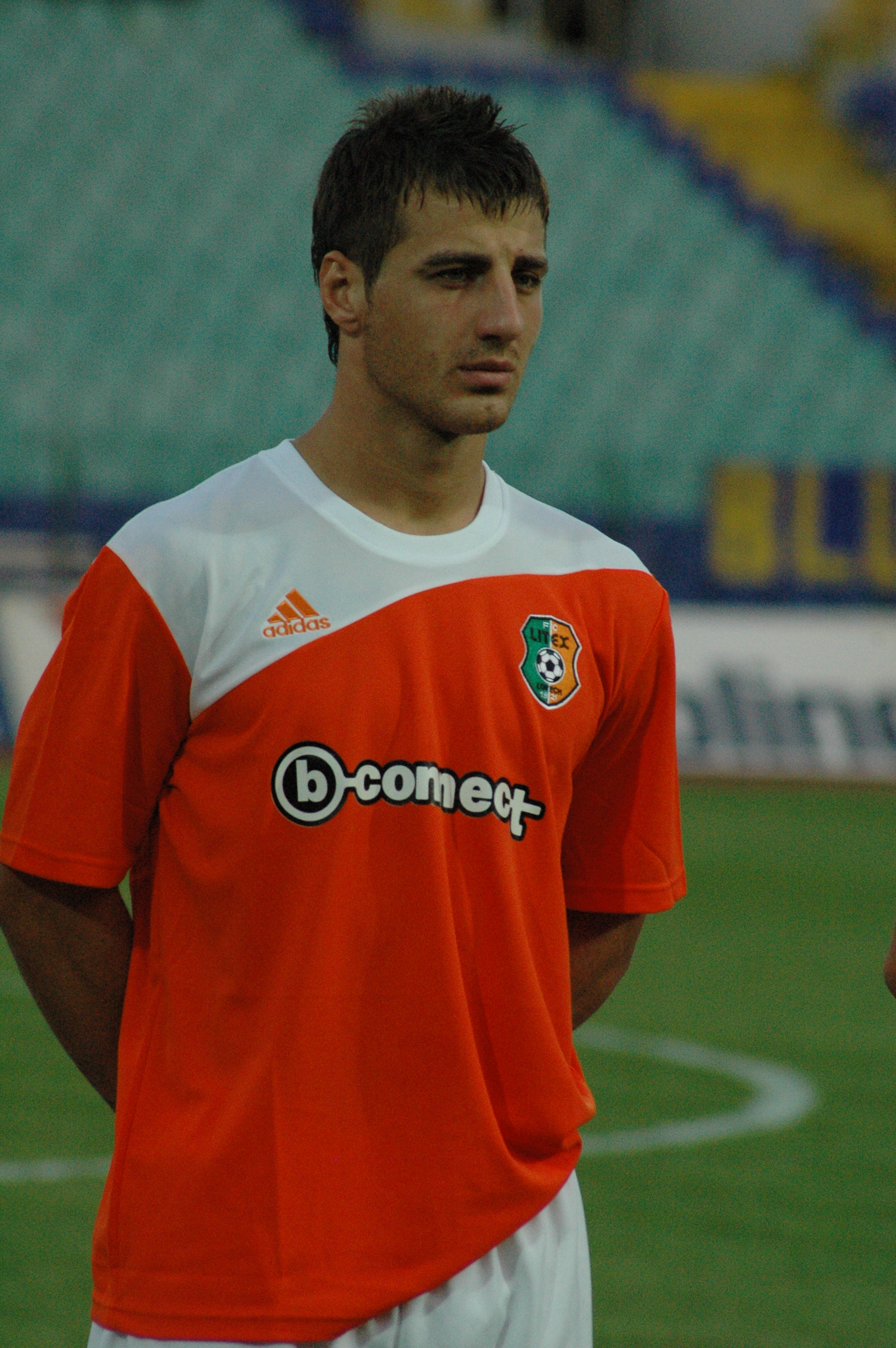
Bodurov with Litex in 2009

In July 2009, Litex Lovech signed Bodurov on a four-year deal. He was given the number 33 shirt. He made his competitive debut for Litex on 1 August 2009, against Levski Sofia for the Bulgarian Supercup. Bodurov made his league debut against Montana on 30 August, playing the full 90 minutes. The game ended with a 3–0 victory to Litex. On 25 March 2010, he netted his first goal for the club, scoring header in the 1–0 home win against Sliven 2000. In his first season playing for Litex, he made 18 appearances in the A PFG and ended the season winning his first league golden medal. During a campaign, he was mainly used as a right-back.

On 20 December 2010, Bodurov was named 2010 A PFG Defender of the Year. He collected his second A PFG title winner's medal at the end of the 2010–11 season.

On 3 August 2011, he scored the only goal for Litex in a 1–3 away loss against Wisła Kraków in the Champions League qualifying match. On 21 August 2011, as a result of injury to regular captain Nebojša Jelenković, Bodurov captained Litex for the first time in the last 22 minutes against Svetkavitsa at the Lovech Stadium in a 6–0 Litex victory. A week later, he scored his first league goal of the 2011–12 season in a 2–0 win at Slavia Sofia.

=== Fulham ===
On 1 August 2014, Bodurov signed a three-year contract with English side Fulham with an additional one-year option. The 28-year-old immediately joined up with his new club on their pre-season tour of Austria at a training camp in Innsbruck. He made his league debut in the opening game of the season, in a 2–1 loss to Ipswich Town on 9 August, playing full 90 minutes in the centre of defence. Bodurov scored his first goal for Fulham to open the scoring against Derby County in a 2–0 home win on 28 February 2015. Bodurov's contract was cancelled by mutual consent on 26 August 2016.

==== FC Midtjylland (loan) ====
On 1 February 2016, Bodurov signed on loan for Midtjylland for the remainder of the campaign. He played 15 games in the Danish Superliga and helped his team finish third. Bodurov also participated in Europa League matches against Manchester United, scoring an own goal.

=== CSKA Sofia ===
On 23 January 2017, Bodurov signed with CSKA Sofia until the end of the season. He quickly established himself as a key player for the "redmen", but was frozen out of the first team in August 2019 (alongside Rúben Pinto) by manager Ljupko Petrović, reportedly for disciplinary reasons. After Petrović's resignation, it was confirmed by owner Grisha Ganchev that Bodurov will not be reinstated to the first team.

=== Esteghlal ===
On 30 January 2020, Bodurov signed for Iranian club Esteghlal on a six-month contract until the end of the season, with an option to extend his contract until the end of the 2020–21 season. He was handed the number 20 jersey. On 10 February 2020, he made his official debut for the club in an AFC Champions League away match against Al-Shorta.

== International career ==
On 8 October 2010, Bodurov made his debut for the Bulgaria national team in the 1–0 away win in a Euro 2012 qualifying match against Wales in Cardiff. During a 2014 World Cup qualifying match against Denmark on 26 March 2013, Bodurov ruptured his ligament of ankle, and received surgery two days later. He reclaimed his starting spot for the national team following his return from injury, but was sent off on 11 October 2013, in the 1–2 away loss against Armenia in a World Cup qualifier.

On 9 September 2014, Bodurov captained his country for the first time in the 2–1 away victory over Azerbaijan in a Euro 2016 qualifier after regular captain Ivelin Popov had sustained an injury a few days prior to the match. He subsequently dedicated the win to Popov.

=== International goals ===
Scores and results list Bulgaria's goal tally first.

#	Date	Venue	Opponent	Score	Result	Competition
1.	13 October 2014	Ullevaal Stadion, Oslo, Norway	Norway	1–1	1–2	UEFA Euro 2016 qualifying
2.	26 March 2018	Pancho Aréna, Felcsút, Hungary	Kazakhstan	2–1	2–1	Friendly

== Career statistics ==
=== Club ===
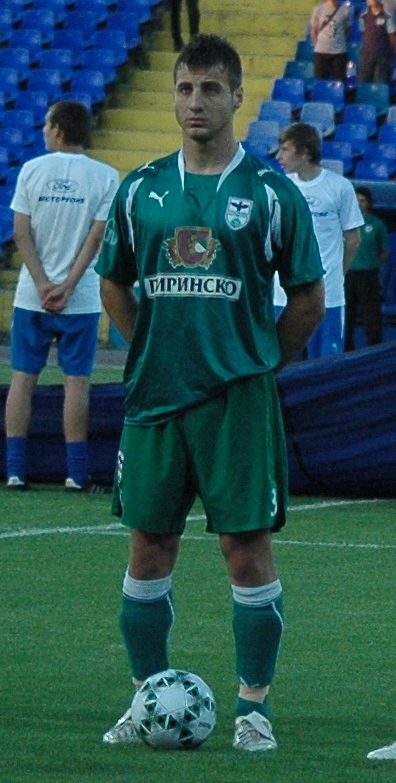
Bodurov playing for Pirin in 2009

Updated 17 February 2020

Club	Season	League			Cup		League Cup		Continental		Total	
Club	Season	Division	Apps	Goals	Apps	Goals	Apps	Goals	Apps	Goals	Apps	Goals
Pirin 1922	2004–05	B Group	29	0	5	0	–		–		34	0
Pirin 1922	2005–06	A Group	13	0	3	0	–		–		16	0
Pirin Blagoevgrad	2006–07	B Group	16	0	3	0	–		–		19	0
Pirin Blagoevgrad	2007–08	A Group	27	1	3	0	–		–		30	1
Pirin Blagoevgrad	2008–09	A Group	22	0	4	0	–		–		26	0
Pirin Blagoevgrad	Pirin total		107	1	21	0	–		0	0	128	1
Litex Lovech	2009–10	A Group	18	2	2	0	–		0	0	20	2
Litex Lovech	2010–11	A Group	25	2	3	0	–		5	0	33	2
Litex Lovech	2011–12	A Group	19	3	3	0	–		6	1	28	4
Litex Lovech	2012–13	A Group	18	0	5	0	–		–		23	0
Litex Lovech	2013–14	A Group	27	1	2	0	–		–		29	1
Litex Lovech	2014–15	A Group	2	0	0	0	–		4	0	6	0
Litex Lovech	Litex total		109	8	15	0	–		15	1	139	9
Fulham	2014–15	Championship	38	1	4	0	2	0	–		44	1
Fulham	2015–16	Championship	3	0	0	0	2	0	–		5	0
Fulham	Fulham total		41	1	4	0	4	0	0	0	49	1
Midtjylland	2015–16	Danish Superliga	15	0	0	0	–		2	0	17	0
Midtjylland	Midtjylland total		15	0	0	0	0	0	2	0	17	0
CSKA Sofia	2016–17	First League	16	1	0	0	—		—		16	1
CSKA Sofia	2017–18	First League	33	2	3	1	—		—		36	3
CSKA Sofia	2018–19	First League	29	0	4	0	—		3	0	36	0
CSKA Sofia	2019–20	First League	2	0	0	0	—		3	0	5	0
CSKA Sofia	CSKA total		80	3	7	1	—		6	0	93	4
Esteghlal	2019–20	Persian Gulf Pro League	1	0	0	0	—		2	0	3	0
Career total			353	13	47	1	4	0	25	1	429	15

=== National team ===
Bulgaria
Year	Apps	Goals
2010	3	0
2011	4	0
2012	9	0
2013	6	0
2014	6	1
2015	5	0
2016	2	0
2017	4	0
2018	8	1
2019	3	0
Total	50	2

== Honours ==
=== Litex Lovech ===
- Bulgarian League (2): 2009–10, 2010–11
- Bulgarian Supercup: 2010

== Personal life ==
Bodurov has a daughter, named Nicole, who was born in 2017.
