= 2012–13 PFC CSKA Sofia season =

CSKA Sofia
2012–13 season
- Chairman: Dimitar Borisov
- Manager: Stoycho Mladenov(until 4 January); Miodrag Ješić (until 11 March); Milen Radukanov(from 11 March)
- A Group: Third place
- Bulgarian Cup: Quarterfinal
- UEFA Europa League: 2nd qualifying round
Home colours	Away colours

The 2012–13 season was PFC CSKA Sofia's 65th consecutive season in A Group. This article shows player statistics and all matches (official and friendly) that the club will play during the 2012–13 season.

== Players ==
=== Squad stats ===
Appearances for competitive matches only

No.	Pos	Nat	Player	Total		A Group		Bulgarian Cup		Europa League	
No.	Pos	Nat	Player	Apps	Goals	Apps	Goals	Apps	Goals	Apps	Goals
1	GK	(Bulgaria) BUL	Anatoli Gospodinov	0	0	0	0	0	0	0	0
4	DF	(Bulgaria) BUL	Mihail Venkov	24	2	18	2	6	0	0	0
5	DF	(Bulgaria) BUL	Kostadin Stoyanov	10	0	7+2	0	1	0	0	0
6	DF	(Bulgaria) BUL	Plamen Krachunov	26	1	21	1	3	0	2	0
7	FW	(Bulgaria) BUL	Spas Delev	16	5	12+2	5	1+1	0	0	0
8	DF	(Brazil) BRA	Lucas Sasha	36	3	28+1	2	5	1	1+1	0
9	FW	(Brazil) BRA	Marcinho	8	3	6+1	3	0+1	0	0	0
10	MF	(Portugal) POR	Serginho	25	5	12+7	5	5+1	0	0	0
11	DF	(Bulgaria) BUL	Ivan Bandalovski	28	2	23	2	4	0	1	0
12	GK	(Czech Republic) CZE	Tomáš Černý	37	0	29	0	6	0	2	0
14	FW	(Togo) TOG	Serge Nyuiadzi	9	1	5+3	1	1	0	0	0
15	FW	(Bulgaria) BUL	Stanko Yovchev	8	2	2+3	2	0+1	0	0+2	0
17	FW	(Madagascar) MAD	Anicet Andrianantenaina	34	8	26	6	6	2	2	0
18	MF	(Bulgaria) BUL	Ivaylo Chochev	12	0	6+4	0	0+2	0	0	0
19	DF	(Bulgaria) BUL	Apostol Popov	33	1	26	0	5	0	2	1
20	MF	(Bulgaria) BUL	Bogomil Hristov	4	0	1+3	0	0	0	0	0
21	DF	(Bulgaria) BUL	Ventsislav Vasilev	13	1	8+3	1	2	0	0	0
22	FW	(Bulgaria) BUL	Martin Kamburov	12	3	5+5	3	1+1	0	0	0
23	FW	(Brazil) BRA	Michel Platini	21	10	15+2	8	4	2	0	0
25	DF	(Bulgaria) BUL	Angel Granchov	15	0	8+3	0	3	0	0+1	0
27	MF	(Bulgaria) BUL	Milen Ivanov	1	0	1	0	0	0	0	0
30	DF	(Bulgaria) BUL	Vasil Popov	4	0	1+2	0	0+1	0	0	0
31	MF	(Bulgaria) BUL	Valdemar Stoyanov	1	0	0+1	0	0	0	0	0
43	MF	(Bulgaria) BUL	Yuliyan Nenov	1	0	0+1	0	0	0	0	0
45	FW	(Bulgaria) BUL	Grigor Dolapchiev	5	2	0+4	1	0+1	1	0	0
46	MF	(Bulgaria) BUL	Stoyan Stoichkov	1	0	0+1	0	0	0	0	0
48	DF	(Bulgaria) BUL	Bozhidar Chorbadzhiyski	1	0	0+1	0	0	0	0	0
70	MF	(Uruguay) URU	Ignacio Lores Varela	15	1	9+4	1	2	0	0	0
71	MF	(Bulgaria) BUL	Anton Karachanakov	11	3	9	3	0	0	1+1	0
85	GK	(Bulgaria) BUL	Bozhidar Stoychev	1	0	1	0	0	0	0	0
99	MF	(Cameroon) CMR	Njongo Priso	29	1	19+3	0	5	1	2	0
Players sold or loaned out after the start of the season:
2	DF	(France) FRA	Jérémie Rodrigues	3	0	1	0	0+2	0	0	0
4	MF	(Curaçao) CUW	Civard Sprockel	0	0	0	0	0	0	0	0
5	MF	(Bulgaria) BUL	Todor Yanchev	20	0	15	0	3	0	2	0
7	MF	(Bulgaria) BUL	Hristo Yanev	2	0	0	0	0	0	2	0
9	FW	(Republic of Ireland) IRL	Cillian Sheridan	4	0	3	0	0	0	1	0
9	MF	(Argentina) ARG	Sebastián Sciorilli	5	0	2+2	0	1	0	0	0
16	DF	(Cape Verde) CPV	Nilson Antonio	7	0	5	0	0	0	2	0
20	MF	(Romania) ROU	Alexandru Păcurar	6	0	3+2	0	0+1	0	0	0
21	MF	(Bulgaria) BUL	Kosta Yanev	2	0	0	0	0	0	2	0
22	MF	(Bulgaria) BUL	Petar Stoyanov	0	0	0	0	0	0	0	0
24	DF	(Portugal) POR	Bernardo Tengarrinha	8	0	1+5	0	1+1	0	0	0
26	MF	(Bulgaria) BUL	Nikolay Dyulgerov	0	0	0	0	0	0	0	0
29	FW	(Brazil) BRA	Tássio	16	6	2+10	4	1+3	2	0	0
33	DF	(France) FRA	Youness Bengelloun	0	0	0	0	0	0	0	0
55	MF	(Greece) GRE	Ilias Kyriakidis	6	0	0+4	0	0+2	0	0	0
88	GK	(Bulgaria) BUL	Blagoy Makendzhiev	0	0	0	0	0	0	0	0

As of 25 May 2013

== Players in/out ==
=== Summer transfers ===
In: Note: Flags indicate national team as defined under FIFA eligibility rules; some limited exceptions apply. Players may hold more than one non-FIFA nationality.

No.	Pos.	Nation	Player
1	GK	BUL	Anatoli Gospodinov (Free from Sliven)
2	DF	FRA	Jérémie Rodrigues (Free from Lokomotiv Plovdiv)
4	DF	CUW	Civard Sprockel (Free from Anorthosis Famagusta)
4	DF	BUL	Mihail Venkov (Free from Lokomotiv Plovdiv)
7	MF	BUL	Hristo Yanev (Free from Litex Lovech)
8	MF	BRA	Lucas Sasha (Free from Grêmio Barueri Futebol)
9	FW	IRL	Cillian Sheridan (Loan return from St Johnstone)
10	MF	POR	Serginho (Free from Lokomotiv Plovdiv)
12	GK	CZE	Tomáš Černý (Free from Hamilton Academical)
14	FW	TOG	Serge Nyuiadzi (from Nice)
16	DF	CPV	Nilson Antonio (Free from AEL Limassol)
20	MF	ROU	Alexandru Păcurar (Free from Universitatea Cluj)
23	FW	BRA	Michel Platini (from Dinamo București)
24	MF	POR	Bernardo Tengarrinha (from Vitória Setúbal)
29	FW	BRA	Tássio (Free from Lokomotiv Plovdiv)
33	DF	FRA	Youness Bengelloun (Free from Lokomotiv Plovdiv)
55	MF	GRE	Ilias Kyriakidis (Free from Lokomotiv Plovdiv)

Out: Note: Flags indicate national team as defined under FIFA eligibility rules; some limited exceptions apply. Players may hold more than one non-FIFA nationality.

No.	Pos.	Nation	Player
1	GK	BUL	Zdravko Chavdarov (Released)
3	DF	BRA	Ademar (Released)
4	DF	CUW	Civard Sprockel (Released)
7	MF	ESP	Antonio Tomás (Released)
7	MF	BUL	Hristo Yanev (Released)
8	DF	BUL	Rumen Trifonov (Released)
9	FW	GEQ	Iván Bolado (Released)
9	FW	IRL	Cillian Sheridan (Released)
10	FW	BRA	Júnior Moraes (to Metalurh Donetsk)
14	FW	BUL	Stanislav Kostov (Loaned at Botev Plovdiv, later sold to the club)
16	MF	BUL	Aleksandar Yakimov (Loaned at Botev Vratsa)
18	MF	BUL	Boris Galchev (to Dinamo București)
21	MF	BUL	Kosta Yanev (Released)
22	MF	BUL	Petar Stoyanov (Released)
23	DF	BUL	Martin Dechev (Released to Cherno More Varna)
24	DF	NED	Ilias Haddad (Released)
26	MF	BUL	Nikolay Dyulgerov (Released)
27	MF	BUL	Kristiyan Petrov (Loaned at Botev Vratsa)
32	FW	ROU	Georgian Păun (Loan return to Dinamo București)
92	GK	ALG	Raïs M'Bolhi (Loan return to Krylia Sovetov Samara)
—	DF	BUL	Aleksandar Dyulgerov (Released, previously on loan at Montana)
—	MF	BUL	Chetin Sadula (Released to Etar 1924 Veliko Tarnovo, previously on loan at Kaliakra Kavarna)
—	GK	BUL	Bozhidar Stoychev (Loaned at Neftohimik Burgas)
—	MF	BUL	Vladimir Baharov (Loaned at Neftohimik Burgas, previously on loan at Akademik Sofia)

=== Winter transfers ===
In: Note: Flags indicate national team as defined under FIFA eligibility rules; some limited exceptions apply. Players may hold more than one non-FIFA nationality.

No.	Pos.	Nation	Player
7	FW	BUL	Spas Delev (Free transfer)
9	MF	BRA	Marcinho (Free from Guaratinguetá)
18	MF	BUL	Ivaylo Chochev (from Chavdar Etropole)
21	DF	BUL	Ventsislav Vasilev (from Minyor Pernik)
22	FW	BUL	Martin Kamburov (Free transfer)
70	MF	URU	Ignacio Lores Varela (Loaned from Palermo, previously on loan at Botev Vratsa)
85	GK	BUL	Bozhidar Stoychev (Loan return from Neftohimik Burgas)

Out: Note: Flags indicate national team as defined under FIFA eligibility rules; some limited exceptions apply. Players may hold more than one non-FIFA nationality.

No.	Pos.	Nation	Player
2	DF	FRA	Jérémie Rodrigues (Released)
5	MF	BUL	Todor Yanchev (Released)
9	FW	ARG	Sebastián Sciorilli (Released)
16	DF	CPV	Nilson Antonio (Released)
24	MF	POR	Bernardo Tengarrinha (Released)
29	FW	BRA	Tássio (to Damash Gilan)
33	DF	FRA	Youness Bengelloun (Released)
55	MF	GRE	Ilias Kyriakidis (Released)
88	GK	BUL	Blagoy Makendzhiev (Released)

== Pre-season and friendlies ==
Win Draw Loss Fixtures

=== Pre-season ===
23 June 2012 Friendly	CSKA (Bulgaria)	1–2	(Russia) Torpedo Moscow	Tsarsko selo
11:00	H. Yanev 28'	gong.bg	Galvaus 16'; Kakalov 80'	Stadium: Tsarsko selo

1 July 2012 Friendly	CSKA (Bulgaria)	3–0	(Iran) Sepahan Isfahan	Kızılcahamam, Turkey
16:00	Coda 46'; H. Yanev 51'; Mendes 84'; Bandalovski (yellow card) 81'	gong.bg

4 July 2012 Friendly	CSKA (Bulgaria)	1–2	(Russia) Volga	Kızılcahamam, Turkey
16:00	H. Yanev 87' (pen.)	gong.bg	Ahmetović 44'; Bibilov 65'

7 July 2012 Friendly	CSKA (Bulgaria)	1–2	(Romania) Viitorul Constanța	Karacasu, Turkey
16:00	Priso 10'; H. Yanev (yellow card) 38'; Yanchev (yellow card) 48'	gong.bg	Iancu 20'; Chițu 45'

10 July 2012 Friendly	CSKA (Bulgaria)	1–0	(Turkey) Karabükspor	Karacasu, Turkey
16:00	Bandalovski 62'	gong.bg

14 July 2012 Friendly	CSKA (Bulgaria)	2–0	(North Macedonia) Drita	Sofia
20:00	Moraes 50'; Krachunov 53'	gong.bg		Stadium: Balgarska Armiya

21 July 2012 Friendly	CSKA	5–0	Botev Vratsa	Sofia
11:00	Michel 26', 28', 58'; Silva 80'; Ivanov 88'	gong.bg		Stadium: Balgarska Armiya; Referee: Kalin Lyudmilov

28 July 2012 Friendly	CSKA (Bulgaria)	0–2	(Greece) Atromitos	Sofia
20:00			Cantó 42'; Iglesias 52'	Stadium: Balgarska Armiya

1 August 2012 Friendly	CSKA	1–0	Rakovski	Sofia
18:00	Michel 44'			Stadium: Balgarska Armiya

8 August 2012 Friendly	CSKA	1–0	Slivnishki geroy	Slivnitsa
18:00	Nyuiadzi 12'	Report		Stadium: Slivniski Geroy; Attendance: 300; Referee: Petar Vladimirov

=== On-season (autumn) ===
15 August 2012 Friendly	CSKA	2–2	Lokomotiv Mezdra	Mezdra
18:00	Serginho 60'; Tássio 79'	Report	Mikov 41'; Zlatkov 81' (pen.)	Stadium: Lokomotiv; Attendance: 300; Referee: Simeon Kachovski

22 August 2012 Friendly	CSKA	5–0	Chavdar Etropole	Sofia
18:00	Michel 4', 48'; Serginho 7'; Venkov 38'; Tássio 46'	Report		Stadium: Balgarska Armiya; Referee: Georgi Ignatov

29 August 2012 Friendly	CSKA	1–0	Spartak Pleven	Tsarsko selo
18:00	Tengarrinha 36'	Report		Stadium: Tsarsko selo

6 September 2012 Friendly	CSKA	1–2	Lokomotiv Plovdiv	Sofia
17:00	Tássio 82'	Report	Kurdov 35'; V. Georgiev 62'; Markov (yellow card) 12'; D. Georgiev (yellow card) 49'	Stadium: Balgarska Armiya

18 September 2012 Friendly	CSKA	4–0	Slivnishki geroy	Sofia
18:00	Michel; Josef (o.g.); Tássio			Stadium: Balgarska Armiya

26 September 2012 Friendly	CSKA	5–0	Marek	Tsarsko selo
17:00	Michel 69', 72', 85', 90'; Nyuiadzi 74'	Report		Stadium: Tsarsko selo

12 October 2012 Friendly	CSKA	1–0	Botev Vratsa	Tsarsko selo
16:00	Priso 85'	Report		Stadium: Tsarsko selo Attendance: 100; Referee: Angel Angelov

14 October 2012 Friendly	CSKA (Bulgaria)	3–1	(Serbia) Radnički Niš	Niš, Serbia
14:00	Tássio 33'; Karachanakov 34'; Serginho 79'	Report	Jovanović 38'	Stadium: Stadion Čair

23 October 2012 Friendly	CSKA	4–0	Dimitrovgrad	Dimitrovgrad
16:00	Tássio 20'; Michel 24', 88'; Sciorilli 53'			Stadium: Minyor; Attendance: 2,000

=== Mid-season ===
19 January 2013 Friendly	CSKA (Bulgaria)	1–1	(Switzerland) Servette	Alaniya, Turkey
15:00	Michel 45'		Kossoko 35' (pen.)

22 January 2013 Friendly	CSKA (Bulgaria)	3–3	(Azerbaijan) Simurq	Side, Turkey
15:00	Sasha 35'; Kamburov 44'; Serginho 65' (pen.)		Gurbanov 11'; Poljak 51' (pen.); Božić 90' (pen.)

25 January 2013 Friendly	CSKA (Bulgaria)	3–3	(Russia) Ufa	Side, Turkey
17:00	Alikin 6' (o.g.); Kamburov 18'; Granchov 55'		Zaseyev 31'; Mikheyev 43'; Podkorytov 58'

31 January 2013 Friendly	CSKA (Bulgaria)	2–1	(Austria) Wacker Innsbruck	Alaniya, Turkey
15:00	Michel 45'; Kyriakidis 71'		Merino 63'

5 February 2013 Friendly tournament	CSKA (Bulgaria)	1–1 (7–6 p)	(Ukraine) Oleksandriya	Alaniya, Turkey
16:00	Priso 89'		Brovchenko 62'

8 February 2013 Friendly tournament	CSKA (Bulgaria)	3–3 (5–6 p)	(Poland) Zagłębie Lubin	Alaniya, Turkey
18:00	Popov 32'; Kyriakidis 58'; Nyuiadzi 64'		Jež 34'; Nhamoinesu 73'; Wilczek 90' (pen.)
	Penalties
	Yovchev (penalty missed); Sasha (penalty scored); Kyriakidis (penalty scored); Priso (penalty scored); Venkov (penalty missed); Dolapchev (penalty scored); Chochev (penalty scored); Popov (penalty missed)		(penalty scored) Vidanov; (penalty scored) Skrzyniarz; (penalty scored) Błąd; (penalty missed) Trochim; (penalty missed) Wilczek; (penalty scored) Bílek; (penalty scored) Lira; (penalty scored) Gliwa

13 February 2013 Friendly	CSKA (Bulgaria)	6–1	(Georgia (country)) Chikhura Sachkhere	Alaniya, Turkey
15:00	Kamburov 10', 30', 34'; Varela 31'; Anicet 42'; Priso 89'		Bolkvadze 58' (pen.)

20 February 2013 Friendly	CSKA (Bulgaria)	0–1	(Serbia) Vojvodina Novi Sad	Novi Sad, Serbia
16:00			Katai 24'	Stadium: Stadion Karađorđe; Attendance: 2,500

23 February 2013 Friendly	CSKA	1–0	Montana	Sofia
15:00	Nyuiadzi 49'			Stadium: Balgarska Armiya

=== On-season (spring) ===
23 March 2013 Friendly	CSKA	3–1	Neftochimic Burgas	Burgas
16:30	Delev 18'; Michel 21'; Kamburov 84'		Bozhinov 30'	Stadium: Lazur

17 April 2013 Friendly	CSKA	2–1	Chavdar Etropole	Sofia
17:00	Chochev 45'; Petrov 60'; Krachunov (yellow card) 7'; Hristov (yellow card) 41'; Ivanov (red card) 87'	Report	Etov 49'; Vasilev (yellow card) 44'	Stadium: Balgarska Armiya

== Competitions ==
=== A Group ===
==== Table ====
Pos	Team	Pld	W	D	L	GF	GA	GD	Pts	Qualification or relegation
1	Ludogorets Razgrad (C)	30	22	6	2	58	13	+45	72	Qualification for Champions League second qualifying round
2	Levski Sofia	30	22	5	3	59	20	+39	71	Qualification for Europa League first qualifying round
3	CSKA Sofia	30	19	6	5	54	20	+34	63	Excluded from European competitions (Note: PFC CSKA Sofia were excluded from European competitions due to debts.)
4	Botev Plovdiv	30	18	6	6	51	21	+30	60	Qualification for Europa League first qualifying round
5	Litex Lovech	30	15	5	10	56	24	+32	50	

Source: A PFG (in Bulgarian)
Rules for classification: 1st points; 2nd head-to-head points; 3rd head-to-head goal difference; 4th head-to-head goals scored; 5th head-to-head away goals scored; 6th goal difference; 7th goals scored
(C) Champions

==== Results summary ====
Overall								Home						Away					
Pld	W	D	L	GF	GA	GD	Pts	W	D	L	GF	GA	GD	W	D	L	GF	GA	GD
30	19	6	5	54	20	+34	63	11	3	1	25	7	+18	8	3	4	29	13	+16

Last updated: 25 May 2013.
Source: Soccerway

==== Results by round ====
Round	1	2	3	4	5	6	7	8	9	10	11	12	13	14	15	16	17	18	19	20	21	22	23	24	25	26	27	28	29	30
Ground	A	A	H	A	H	A	H	A	H	A	H	A	H	A	H	H	H	A	H	A	H	A	H	A	H	A	H	A	H	A
Result	L	D	D	W	W	L	W	W	W	D	W	D	W	W	D	L	W	W	W	W	D	W	W	L	W	W	W	W	W	L
Position	12	12	12	8	8	8	6	5	4	4	3	4	3	3	4	4	4	4	4	3	4	3	3	4	3	3	3	3	3	3

Source: See Results
A = Away; H = Home; W = Win; D = Draw; L = Loss

==== Fixtures and results ====
11 August 2012 1	Litex	1–0	CSKA	Lovech
20:00	Zakov 90+2'; Jelenković (yellow card) 21'	Report	Popov (yellow card) 18'; Bandalovski (yellow card) 71'	Stadium: Lovech; Attendance: 3,800; Referee: Stanislav Todorov (Shumen)

19 August 2012 2	Chernomorets	1–1	CSKA	Burgas
20:00	Boli 70'; Kolev (yellow card) 62'; Ouattara (yellow card) 86'	Report	Dyankov 22' (o.g.); Bandalovski (yellow card) 49'; Karachanakov (yellow card) 61'	Stadium: Lazur; Attendance: 7,000; Referee: Radan Miryanov (Varna)

25 August 2012 3	CSKA	0–0	Lokomotiv Plovdiv	Sliven
18:00	Priso (yellow card) 32'; Nilson (yellow card) 56'	Report	Atanasov (yellow card) 35'; Diego (yellow card) 38'; Kovachev (yellow card) 69'; Stankov (yellow card); D.Georgiev (yellow card) 84' (yellow-red card) 88'	Stadium: Hadzhi Dimitar; Attendance: 4,000; Referee: Stanislav Stavrov (Veliko Tarnovo)

31 August 2012 4	Minyor	1–4	CSKA	Svoge
18:00	M. Vasilev 15'; Tsvetkov (yellow card) 34'; V. Vasilev (yellow card) 75'	Report	Karachanakov 27', 72'; Yovchev 52', 58'; Yanchev (yellow card) 24'; Popov (yellow card) 45+1'; Karachanakov (yellow card) 70'	Stadium: Chavdar Tsvetkov; Attendance: 350; Referee: Ivaylo Stoyanov (Petrich)

15 September 2012 5	CSKA	3–0	Botev Vratsa	Sofia
17:00	Anicet 26' (pen.), 62'; Karachanakov 81'; Păcurar (yellow card) 69'	Report	Vasilev (yellow card) 25'; Lores (yellow card) 54'; Caballero (yellow card) 69'	Stadium: Ovcha Kupel; Attendance: 3,400; Referee: Angel Bayaltsaliev (Sofia)

22 September 2012 6	Ludogorets	1–0	CSKA	Razgrad
20:00	Marcelinho 75'; Ivanov (yellow card) 30' (yellow-red card) 71'; Marcelinho (yellow card) 72'	Report	Sasha (yellow card) 11'; Karachanakov (yellow card) 61'; Bandalovski (yellow card) 69'	Stadium: Ludogorets Arena; Attendance: 5,990; Referee: Georgi Yordanov (Gabrovo)

30 September 2012 7	CSKA	3–1	Etar	Sofia
17:00	Serginho 44'; Tássio 54'; Anicet 71' (pen.); Krachunov (yellow card) 67'; Serginho (yellow card) 81'; Popov (yellow card) 83'; Nyuiadzi (yellow card) 87'	Report	Hikmet 30'; Hikmet (yellow card) 59'; Tsankov (yellow card) 70'; Anev (yellow card) 90+2'	Stadium: Ovcha Kupel; Attendance: 2,000; Referee: Nikola Spasov (Sofia)

6 October 2012 8	Slavia	0–2	CSKA	Sofia
16:00	Zhelev (yellow card) 8'; Petkov (yellow card) 53'; Dimitrov (yellow card) 63'	Report	Sasha 1'; Venkov 90'; Venkov (yellow card) 10'; Bandalovski (yellow card) 38'; Tássio (yellow card) 53'; Nyuiadzi (yellow card) 59'; Granchov (yellow card) 62'	Stadium: Ovcha Kupel; Attendance: 3,220; Referee: Kalin Lyudmilov (Sofia)

20 October 2012 9	CSKA	1–0	Levski	Sofia
16:00	Nyuiadzi 46'; Karachanakov (yellow card) 24'; Nyuiadzi (yellow card) 43'; Bandalovski (yellow card) 45+1'; Serginho (yellow card) 84'; Păcurar (yellow card) 87'	Report	Mulder (yellow card) 36'; Starokin (yellow card) 76'; Angelov (yellow card) 86'	Stadium: Vasil Levski; Attendance: 17,340; Referee: Stanislav Todorov (Shumen)

27 October 2012 10	Botev Plovdiv	1–1	CSKA	Plovdiv
16:00	Tsvetkov 41' (pen.); Grnčarov (yellow card) 30'; Nedelev (yellow card) 45+1'	Report	Tássio 80'; Krachunov (yellow card) 27'; Rodrigues (yellow card) 40'; Yanchev (yellow card) 59'; Popov (yellow card) 88'; Serginho (yellow card) 90+2'	Stadium: Hristo Botev; Attendance: 15,710; Referee: Tasko Taskov (Sofia)

4 November 2012 11	CSKA	1–0	Montana	Sofia
14:30	Tássio 64' (pen.)	Report	Kostadinov (yellow card) 18'; Antonov (yellow card) 28'; Iliev (yellow card) 40'	Stadium: Ovcha Kupel; Attendance: 4,760; Referee: Nikolay Yordanov (Sofia)

10 November 2012 12	Cherno More	0–0	CSKA	Varna
12:30	Camazzola (yellow card) 41'; S. Aleksandrov (yellow card) 62'	Report	Krachunov (yellow card) 22'; Priso (yellow card) 32'; Yanchev (yellow card) 54'	Stadium: Ticha; Attendance: 5,500; Referee: Georgi Yordanov (Gabrovo)

18 November 2012 13	CSKA	2–0	Beroe	Sofia
14:30	Michel 30', 58' (pen.); Yanchev (yellow card) 24'; Bandalovski (yellow card) 86'	Report	Louzeiro (yellow card) 38'; Dinkov (yellow card) 45+1'; Sales (yellow card) 76'; Dishliev (yellow card) 88'	Stadium: Vasil Levski; Attendance: 2,000; Referee: Vihren Manev (Sofia)

28 November 2012 14	Pirin Gotse Delchev	0–5	CSKA	Gotse Delchev
14:30	Lazarov (yellow card) 23'; Gutsev (yellow card) 54'	Report	Michel 17', 25', 75'; Tássio 83'; Anicet 88'; Michel (yellow card) 54'; Krachunov (yellow card) 55'	Stadium: Gradski; Attendance: 4,110; Referee: Aleksandar Kostadinov (Sofia)

9 December 2012 15	CSKA	1–1	Lokomotiv Sofia	Sofia
14:00	Serginho 59'; Michel (yellow card) 18'; Venkov (yellow card) 35'; Krachunov (yellow card) 52'; Popov (yellow card) 86'	Report	Peev 77' (pen.); Telkiyski (yellow card) 35'; Hristov (yellow card) 88'	Stadium: Vasil Levski; Attendance: 880; Referee: Ahmed Ahmed (Burgas)

2 March 2013 16	CSKA	0–2	Litex	Sofia
15:00	Nyuiadzi (yellow card) 35'; Anicet (yellow card) 62'; Popov (yellow card) 64'; Vasilev (yellow card) 74'	Report	Vajushi 6', 57'; Jelenković (yellow card) 24'; Bodurov (yellow card) 37'; Slavchev (yellow card) 39'; Tsvetkov (yellow card) 52'	Stadium: Balgarska Armiya; Attendance: 6,750; Referee: Stanislav Todorov (Shumen)

10 March 2013 17	CSKA	2–0	Chernomorets	Sofia
15:00	Serginho 23', 90'; Sasha (yellow card) 70'	Report	Tsonkov (yellow card) 9'; Angelov (yellow card) 61'; Pehlivanov (yellow card) 90+2'	Stadium: Balgarska Armiya; Attendance: 2,200; Referee: Tsvetan Krastev (Varna)

16 March 2013 18	Lokomotiv Plovdiv	0–2	CSKA	Plovdiv
15:00	Zlatinski (yellow card) 13'; Zlatinski (penalty missed) 87'	Report	Bandalovski 22'; Gospodinov 30' (o.g.); Chochev (yellow card) 75'; Bandalovski (yellow card) 87'	Stadium: Lauta; Attendance: 4,500; Referee: Ivaylo Stoyanov (Petrich)

31 March 2013 19	CSKA	3–0	Minyor	Sofia
18:00	Kamburov 33'; Lores 37'; Bandalovski 78'; Bandalovski (yellow card) 45+1'; Sasha (yellow card) 83'	Report	Sofroniev (yellow card) 25'; Stoyanov (yellow card) 77'; Hikmet (yellow card) 81'; Stanchev (yellow card) 81'	Stadium: Balgarska Armiya; Attendance: 2,550; Referee: Viktor Valkov (Plovdiv)

6 April 2013 20	Botev Vratsa	3–4	CSKA	Vratsa
15:00	Atanasov 12' (pen.); Alyoshev 35'; Iliev 75' (pen.); Alyoshev (yellow card) 13'; Marinov (red card) 18'; Naydenov (yellow card) 80'	Report	Marcinho 5'; Michel 19' (pen.), 63'; Sasha 77'; Stoyanov (yellow card) 11'; Marcinho (yellow card) 38'; Granchov (yellow card) 80'; Michel (yellow card) 82' (yellow-red card) 83'	Stadium: Hristo Botev; Attendance: 3,500; Referee: Aleksandar Kostadinov (Sofia)

11 April 2013 21	CSKA	0–0	Ludogorets	Sofia
19:00	Venkov (yellow card) 20'; Lores (yellow card) 24'; Sasha (yellow card) 64'; Bandalovski (yellow card) 89'	Report	Caiçara (yellow card) 46'; Marcelinho (yellow card) 50'; Moți (yellow card) 76'; Vitinha (yellow card) 88'	Stadium: Balgarska Armiya; Attendance: 6,250; Referee: Georgi Yordanov (Gabrovo)

14 April 2013 22	Etar	0–4	CSKA	Sliven
17:00	Filipović (red card) 1'; Yılmaz (yellow card) 65'; Saidhodzha (yellow card) 85'	Report	Venkov 32'; Anicet 71'; Kamburov 79' (pen.); Delev 90'; Anicet (yellow card) 87'	Stadium: Hadzhi Dimitar; Attendance: 2,000; Referee: Tsvetan Krastev (Varna)

21 April 2013 23	CSKA	2–1	Slavia	Sofia
15:45	Anicet 66'; Delev 67'; Priso (yellow card) 29'	Report	Sandanski 83'; Lazarov (yellow card) 12'; P. Dimitrov (yellow card) 62'	Stadium: Balgarska Armiya; Attendance: 2,000; Referee: Radan Miryanov (Varna)

27 April 2013 24	Levski	2–1	CSKA	Sofia
16:00	Yovov 40'; João Silva 90'; Yordanov (yellow card) 12'; Angelov (yellow card) 56'; Dimov (yellow card) 69'; João Silva (yellow card) 90+1'	Report	Marcinho 70'; Stoyanov (yellow card) 46'; Delev (yellow card) 49'; Bandalovski (yellow card) 88'	Stadium: Vasil Levski; Attendance: 13,140; Referee: Georgi Yordanov (Gabrovo)

4 May 2013 25	CSKA	1–0	Botev Plovdiv	Sofia
19:30	Marcinho 51'; Sasha (yellow card) 73'; Bandalovski (yellow card) 86'	Report	Pavlov (yellow card) 90+1'; Dyakov (yellow card) 90+3'	Stadium: Balgarska Armiya; Attendance: 3,000; Referee: Nikola Popov (Sofia)

7 May 2013 26	Montana	1–3	CSKA	Montana
15:30	Popov 51' (o.g.); Michev (yellow card) 28'	Report	Delev 15', 25'; Kamburov 89'; Vasilev (yellow card) 81'	Stadium: Ogosta; Attendance: 350; Referee: Vihren Manev (Sofia)

11 May 2013 27	CSKA	3–2	Cherno More	Sofia
20:00	Vasilev 32'; A. Aleksandrov 54' (o.g.); Serginho 78'; Sasha (yellow card) 60'	Report	Inkango 7'; Bandalovski 35' (o.g.); Kolev (yellow card) 56'; Komel (yellow card) 90+3'	Stadium: Balgarska Armiya; Attendance: 500; Referee: Hristo Ristoskov (Sandanski)

19 May 2013 28	Beroe	0–1	CSKA	Stara Zagora
15:45	Ivanov (yellow card) 19'; Krumov (yellow card) 47'	Report	Krachunov 90+1'; Chochev (yellow card) 40'; Bandalovski (yellow card) 88'	Stadium: Beroe; Attendance: 7,550; Referee: Radan Miryanov (Varna)

22 May 2013 29	CSKA	3–0	Pirin Gotse Delchev	Sofia
18:00	Michel 41' (pen.); Drenovichki 79' (o.g.); Delev 87'; Chochev (yellow card) 42'; Stoyanov (yellow card) 54'; Serginho (yellow card) 77'	Report	Bliznakov (yellow card) 37'; Drenovichki (yellow card) 40'; Vitanov (yellow card) 51'	Stadium: Balgarska Armiya; Attendance: 150; Referee: Tsvetan Krastev (Varna)

25 May 2013 30	Lokomotiv Sofia	2–1	CSKA	Sofia
18:00	Pisarov 7'; Iliev 29'; Velkov (yellow card) 25'; Marquinhos (yellow card) 32'; Tom (yellow card) 40'; Mitrev (yellow card) 90+3'	Report	Dolapchiev 73'; Stoyanov (yellow card) 58'; Vasilev (yellow card) 75'	Stadium: Lokomotiv; Attendance: 750; Referee: Ivaylo Stoyanov (Petrich)

=== Bulgarian Cup ===
31 October 2012 Round 2 Leg 1	Ludogorets	1–2	CSKA	Razgrad
20:45	Ivanov 11'; Ivanov (yellow card) 81'	Report	Michel 34'; Sasha 61'; Anicet (yellow card) 35' (yellow-red card) 90'; Michel (yellow card) 57'; Bandalovski (yellow card) 58'; Krachunov (yellow card) 66'	Stadium: Ludogorets Arena; Referee: Hristo Ristoskov (Blagoevgrad)

24 November 2012 Round 2 Leg 2	CSKA	0–1 (2–2(a) agg.)	Ludogorets	Sofia
13:30	Priso (red card) 18'; Venkov (yellow card) 86'; Černý (yellow card) 90+2'	Report	Gargorov 78'; Caiçara (yellow card) 15' (yellow-red card) 69'; Genchev (yellow card) 26'; Choco (yellow card) 50'; Moți (yellow card) 59'	Stadium: Vasil Levski; Referee: Stanislav Todorov (Shumen)

2 December 2012 Round 3 Leg 1	Chavdar Etropole	0–2	CSKA	Etropole
14:00	Valchev (yellow card) 25'	Report	Michel 29'; Anicet 89'; Sasha (yellow card) 50'; Tássio (yellow card) 83'	Stadium: Chavdar; Attendance: 3,400; Referee: Ivan Kirilov (Varna)

15 December 2012 Round 3 Leg 2	CSKA	5–0 (7–0 agg.)	Chavdar Etropole	Blagoevgrad
13:00	Anicet 16'; Tássio 39', 50'; Priso 64'; Dolapchiev 87'	Report	Ivanov (yellow card) 55'	Stadium: Hristo Botev; Attendance: 600; Referee: Georgi Dimitrov (Sofia)

13 March 2013 Quarterfinal Leg 1	Lokomotiv Sofia	0–0	CSKA	Svoge
15:30	Marquinhos (yellow card) 70'	Report	Serginho (yellow card) 45+1'; Sasha (yellow card) 90+2'	Stadium: Chavdar Tsvetkov; Attendance: 230; Referee: Aleksandar Kostadinov (Sofia)

3 April 2013 Quarterfinal Leg 2	CSKA	0–1 (0–1 agg.)	Lokomotiv Sofia	Sofia
15:30	Stoyanov (yellow card) 33'; Popov (yellow card) 83'	Report	Peev 84' (pen.); Dimitrov (yellow card) 32'; Pisarov (yellow card) 62'; Kostadinov (yellow card) 73' (yellow-red card) 89'; Branekov (yellow card) 85'; Mitrev (yellow card) 87'	Stadium: Balgarska Armiya; Attendance: 800; Referee: Kalin Lyudmilov (Sofia)

=== Europa League ===
By ending as runner-up from A Grupa 2011/12, CSKA Sofia qualified for the Europa League. They started in the second qualifying round.

==== Second qualifying round ====
19 July 2012 First leg	Mura 05 (Slovenia)	0–0	(Bulgaria) CSKA	Lendava, Slovenia
21:00	Horvat (red card) 37'; Fajić (yellow card) 38'; Bohar (yellow card) 81'	Report	Popov (yellow card) 37'; K. Yanev (yellow card) 40'; Bandalovski (yellow card) 42'; Sheridan (red card) 69'; Karachanakov (yellow card) 81'; Sasha (yellow card) 85'	Stadium: Športni park Attendance: 2,200; Referee: Lee Probert (England)

26 July 2012 Second leg	CSKA (Bulgaria)	1–1 (1–1(a) agg.)	(Slovenia) Mura 05	Sofia, Bulgaria
20:00	Popov 18'	Report	Fajić 76'; Kramar (yellow card) 36'; Jelić (yellow card) 84'; Fajić (yellow card) 90+3'	Stadium: Vasil Levski; Attendance: 5,800; Referee: Hannes Kaasik (Estonia)

== UEFA Club Rankings ==
This is the current UEFA Club Rankings, including season 2011–12.

Rank	Team	Points	Mvmnt
149	(Serbia) Red Star Belgrade	10.850	▲ (+16)
150	(Netherlands) NAC Breda	10.603	▲ (+13)
151	(Russia) Krylia Sovetov Samara (Russia) FC Moscow	10.566	▲ (+7)
153	(Ukraine) Tavriya Simferopol (Ukraine) Metalurh Donetsk	10.526	▼ (−1)
155	(Switzerland) FC Sion	10.360	▲ (+9)
156	(Bulgaria) CSKA Sofia	10.350	▼ (−9)
157	(Sweden) IF Elfsborg	10.180	▲ (+12)
158	(Netherlands) ADO Den Haag	10.103	New
159	(Norway) SK Brann	9.935	▲ (+1)
160	(Cyprus) AEL	9.920	▲ (+6)
161	(Moldova) Sheriff Tiraspol	9.849	▲ (+1)

== See also ==
- PFC CSKA Sofia
