= Aquilina (surname) =

Aquilina is a surname. Notable people with the surname include:

- Brendan Aquilina (born 1987), Maltese lawn and indoor bowler
- Edward Aquilina (1945–2021), Maltese football player and manager
- John Aquilina (born 1950), Australian politician
- Joseph Aquilina (1911–1997), Maltese author and linguist
- Joseph John Aquilina (born 1957), football player and manager
- Karol Aquilina (born 1979), Maltese politician and lawyer
- Lauren Aquilina (born 1995), English singer-songwriter
- Mario Aquilina (born 1975), Maltese sailor
- Mike Aquilina, American author and journalist
- Pawlu Aquilina (1929–2009), Maltese poet and writer
- Richard Aquilina (1953–2006), Maltese football player
- Rosemarie Aquilina (born 1958), American judge
- Thomas Aquilina (born 2001), Australian football player
- Tony Aquilina (1950–2003), Australian politician
