= Njongo Priso =

Cameroonian footballer (born 1988)

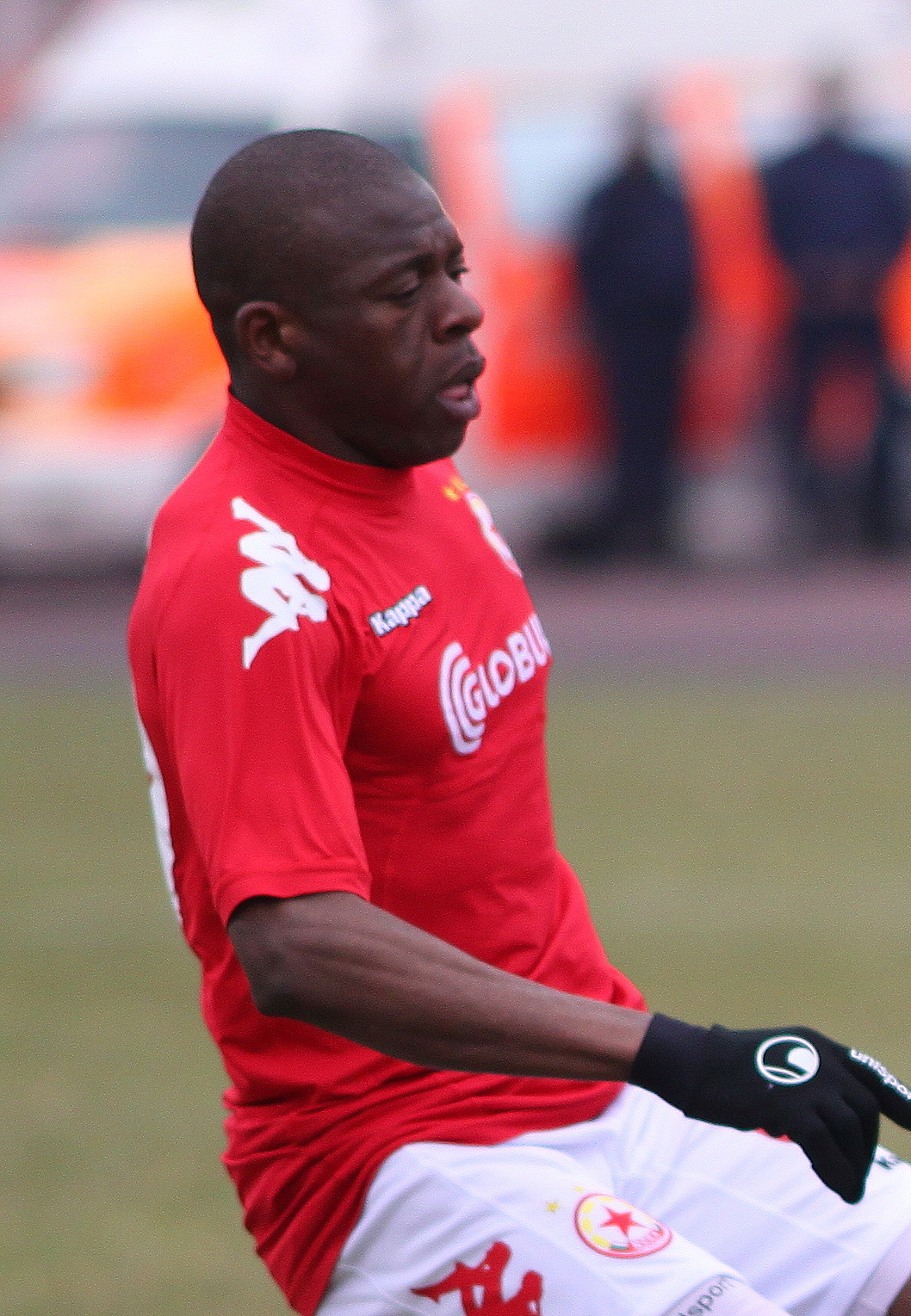

Personal information
- Full name: Njongo Lobe Priso Doding
- Date of birth: 24 December 1988 (age 37)
- Place of birth: Yaoundé, Cameroon
- Height: 1.71 m (5 ft 7 in)
- Position: Winger

Team information
- Current team: Victoria Wanderers

Youth career
- 2005–2007: Fovu Baham

Senior career*
Years	Team	Apps	(Gls)
2007–2008	Msida Saint-Joseph	20	(11)
2008–2011	Valletta	49	(22)
2010–2011	→ AEK Larnaca (loan)	26	(2)
2011	AEK Larnaca	14	(0)
2012–2013	CSKA Sofia	33	(3)
2013–2014	Petrolul Ploiești	38	(4)
2015	Győri ETO	6	(0)
2015–2016	Valletta	13	(8)
2016	Ermis Aradippou	0	(0)
2016	Sliema Wanderers	9	(2)
2016–2017	Mosta	24	(9)
2017–2018	Pembroke Athleta	23	(13)
2018–2019	Hamrun Spartans	8	(0)
2019–	Victoria Wanderers	0	(0)
- * Club domestic league appearances and goals as of 23:55, 7 December 2019 (UTC)

Njongo Lobe Priso Doding (born 24 December 1988) is a Cameroonian professional footballer who plays as a winger for SK Victoria Wanderers FC.

== Club career ==
On 9 July 2008, Njongo Priso signed a contract with Valletta, with whom he won Maltese National League 100 Anniversary Cup and Maltese FA Trophy.

In 2010, Cyprus side AEK Larnaca signed Njongo Priso on a season-long loan deal, with an option to make the move permanent. On 30 August 2010, he made his debut as a second-half substitute in a 2–1 defeat of Omonia. He scored his first goal for AEK in a 1–1 draw at Ermis Aradippou on 26 February 2011. At the end of the season, Priso joined AEK on a free transfer, however Valletta agreed to receive a percentage of any future transfer fee.

Priso moved to Bulgarian club CSKA Sofia on 19 January 2012, for an undisclosed fee believed to be around €320,000. On 25 March, he received a red card in the 3–0 away win over Lokomotiv Plovdiv in an A Group match after an altercation with Dakson. Priso was subsequently banned for seven matches, two for a red card and five due to engaging in confrontation with local police officers in the aftermath of the sending off. The second ban was later reduced from five to two matches on appeal. Priso left CSKA Sofia by mutual agreement on 12 July 2013.

On 16 July 2013, he signed a two-year contract with Romanian Liga I side Petrolul Ploiești. He made his debut on 29 July, after coming on as a late substitute in the 1–1 home draw with Pandurii Târgu Jiu in a league match and scored his first goal a month later in the 2–1 win over Swansea City in a UEFA Europa League game. In early 2015, he became one of Hungarian club Győri ETO's winter signings. His spell with the team turned out to be short due to the club's eventual bankruptcy.

On 7 June 2015, Priso resigned for Valletta.

On 31 August 2019, Maltese club Victoria Wanderers announced that Priso had joined the club.

== International career ==
Priso has represented Cameroon at U-23 level.

== Personal life ==
He is married to a Maltese national.

== Honours ==
Valletta

- Maltese FA Trophy: 2009–10
- Maltese Super Cup: 2007–08

Sliema Wanderers

- Maltese FA Trophy: 2015–16
