= Tony Formosa =

Maltese football manager (1937–2024)

Personal information
- Date of birth: 2 June 1937
- Place of birth: Rabat, Gozo, Malta
- Date of death: 13 January 2024 (aged 86)

Youth career
- Valletta

Senior career*
Years	Team	Apps	(Gls)
1960–1961	St. Patrick FC	4	(0)

Managerial career
- 1961: Żejtun Corinthians
- Ħamrun Spartans
- 1966: Malta
- 1967–1973: Malta U18
- 1968–1970: Valletta
- 1971–1972: Malta
- 1973–1975: Valletta
- 1975–1981: Floriana
- 1982–1986: Sliema Wanderers
- 1986–1988: Valletta (joint)
- * Club domestic league appearances and goals

Tony Formosa (2 June 1937 – 13 January 2024) was a Maltese football manager who managed the national team and a host of Maltese top-level teams.

== Career ==
Formosa's playing career started in the 1960/61 season but it was cut short by injury in February 1961, after fracturing his arm in a game against Marsa. He totalled only four top tier games for St. Patrick F.C.

Formosa had several managerial positions with Maltese giants Ħamrun Spartans, Valletta, and Sliema Wanderers as well as with the national team and the Malta U18 team. Formosa was manager of the national team that played its first ever World Cup qualifier against Hungary in 1971 and achieved a record of 40 matches without defeat with Floriana.

After coaching in 197 Maltese top flight matches, Formosa retired from managing and was appointed Head of Sports within the Ministry of Education and Culture. In this position, he convinced the government to build new sports facilities and managed to lure the Formula One Offshore Powerboats World Championships to Malta for three successive years.

== Death ==
Formosa died on 13 January 2024, at the age of 86.

== Honours ==
Valletta

- Maltese Premier League: 1973-74
- Maltese FA Trophy: 1974-75
- Independence Cup: 1974-75
- Sons of Malta Cup: 1974-75

Floriana

- Maltese Premier League: 1977
- Maltese FA Trophy: 1976, 1981
- Independence Cup: 1975–76, 1976–77, 1977–78, 1978–79
- Sons of Malta Cup: 1975–76, 1976–77, 1977–78
- Testaferrata Cup: 1975–76, 1976–77, 1977–78

Sliema Wanderers

- Euro Cup Malta: 1982
- MFA League Cup: 1984-85
