= Skrzyniarz =

Skrzyniarz is a surname. Notable people with the surname include:

- Amadeusz Skrzyniarz (born 1994), Polish footballer
- Jakub Skrzyniarz (born 1996), Polish handball player
