= Alyoshev =

Alyoshev (Bulgarian: Альошев) is a Bulgarian surname. Notable people with the surname include:

- Petar Alyoshev (born 1987), Bulgarian footballer
- Stiliyan Alyoshev Petrov (born 1979), Bulgarian footballer
