= 1914–15 Maltese Premier League =

Maltese First Division
- Season: 1914–15
- Champions: Valletta United (1st title)
- Matches played: 15
- Goals scored: 47 (3.13 per match)

The 1914–15 Maltese First Division was the fifth edition Maltese First Division. This was won for the first time by Valletta United.

== League table ==
Pos	Team	Pld	W	D	L	GF	GA	GD	Pts
1	Valletta United (C)	5	4	1	0	15	0	+15	9
2	Ħamrun Spartans	5	3	1	1	11	1	+10	7
3	Sliema Wanderers	5	3	0	2	10	6	+4	6
4	Cottonera	5	2	1	2	7	2	+5	5
5	Msida Rangers	5	1	1	3	4	3	+1	3
6	Vittoriosa Melita	5	0	0	5	0	35	−35	0

Source: RSSSF
Rules for classification: 1) points
(C) Champions

== Results ==
Home \ Away	VAL	ĦAM	SLI	COT	MSD	VIT
Valletta United	—	1–0	2–0	0–0	1–0	11–0
Ħamrun Spartans		—	3–0		0–0	8–0
Sliema Wanderers			—	2–1	1–0	7–0
Cottonera				—	1–0	5–0
Msida Rangers					—	4–0
Vittoriosa Melita						—

Source: EU-Football.info

== See also ==
- 1914 in association football
- 1915 in association football
