= Bernardo Tengarrinha =

Portuguese footballer (1989–2021)

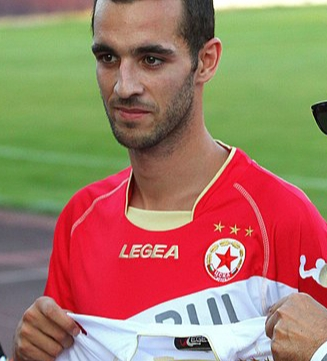
- Tengarrinha presented at CSKA Sofia

Personal information
- Full name: Bernardo David Mendes Salgueiro Campos Tengarrinha
- Date of birth: 17 February 1989
- Place of birth: Lisbon, Portugal
- Date of death: 30 October 2021 (aged 32)
- Place of death: Porto, Portugal
- Height: 1.84 m (6 ft 0 in)
- Positions: Centre-back; defensive midfielder

Youth career
- 1997–1998: Odivelas
- 1998–2005: Benfica
- 2005–2008: Porto

Senior career*
Years	Team	Apps	(Gls)
2008–2011	Porto	0	(0)
2009	→ Estrela Amadora (loan)	9	(0)
2009–2010	→ Olhanense (loan)	23	(2)
2010	→ Santa Clara (loan)	6	(0)
2011–2012	Vitória Setúbal	22	(0)
2012–2013	CSKA Sofia	6	(0)
2013	Freamunde	13	(0)
2013–2014	Chaves	18	(0)
2014–2017	Boavista	52	(2)
Total		149	(4)

International career
2005	Portugal U16	4	(0)
2005–2006	Portugal U17	10	(0)
2007–2008	Portugal U19	11	(0)
2009	Portugal U21	4	(0)
- * Club domestic league appearances and goals

Bernardo David Mendes Salgueiro Campos Tengarrinha (17 February 1989 – 30 October 2021) was a Portuguese professional footballer who played as a centre-back or a defensive midfielder.

He made 106 Primeira Liga appearances for Estrela da Amadora, Olhanense, Vitória de Setúbal and Boavista, after starting his career at Porto.

Tengarrinha played for Portugal up to under-21 level, and in the Bulgarian First Professional Football League for CSKA Sofia. He paused his career in 2017 due to leukaemia, and he died of Hodgkin lymphoma at the age of 32.

== Club career ==
Tengarrinha was born in Lisbon. After seven years with S.L. Benfica he finished his youth career at FC Porto, where he was promoted to the first team in 2008. He made his debut in a Taça de Portugal third round game on 18 October away to Sertanense FC, as a 76th-minute substitute for Mariano González in a 4–0 win. In the quarter-finals on 14 December, he made his only other appearance, starting a 4–1 victory away to C.D. Cinfães but making way for Daniel Candeias after 35 minutes.

Tengarrinha was loaned in January 2009 to C.F. Estrela da Amadora. He played his first Primeira Liga game on 7 February, a 0–0 home draw against Vitória de Setúbal, but the team would eventually be relegated due to financial irregularities.

For the 2009–10 season Tengarrinha was loaned again, this time to newly promoted club S.C. Olhanense. He scored his first goal as a professional on 6 December 2009, but the Algarve side lost 5–2 at C.S. Marítimo.

Tengarrinha spent the first part of the 2010–11 campaign with C.D. Santa Clara of the Segunda Liga, where he featured rarely. In January 2011, he joined Vitória de Setúbal in the top division, on a permanent two-year contract.

On 15 July 2012, free agent Tengarrinha moved abroad for the first time and joined PFC CSKA Sofia from the First Professional Football League (Bulgaria). He and Nilson Antonio complained of unpaid wages, and in November 2020, the club was ordered by FIFA to pay the duo over 1.1 million Bulgarian leva. On 31 January 2013, the last day of the following transfer window, he returned to his country, signing a five-month deal with second-tier S.C. Freamunde.

On 17 June 2014, after one season in division two with G.D. Chaves, Tengarrinha returned to the Portuguese top flight after agreeing to a three-year contract with Boavista FC. He contributed one goal in 27 matches in his first year, helping the team reach a final 13th position.

== International career ==
Tengarrinha won 29 caps for Portugal at youth level. His debut with the under-21s came on 4 June 2009, as he started in the 1–0 group stage home loss against Chile in that year's Toulon Tournament.

== Illness and death ==
Tengarrinha was due to sign with Romanian Liga I side CSM Politehnica Iași on 8 June 2017. He put his career on hold in October, after it was announced he was suffering from leukaemia. He became the ambassador for a mental health initiative by the Portuguese footballers' union (SJPF), and in August 2018 was hired to coach Vitória de Setúbal's under-23 team.

Tengarrinha died of Hodgkin lymphoma on 30 October 2021, at the age of 32. Hours later, his former teams Porto and Boavista paid tribute to him ahead of their local derby.

== Honours ==
Porto

- Taça de Portugal: 2008–09
