= Plamen Krachunov =

Bulgarian footballer

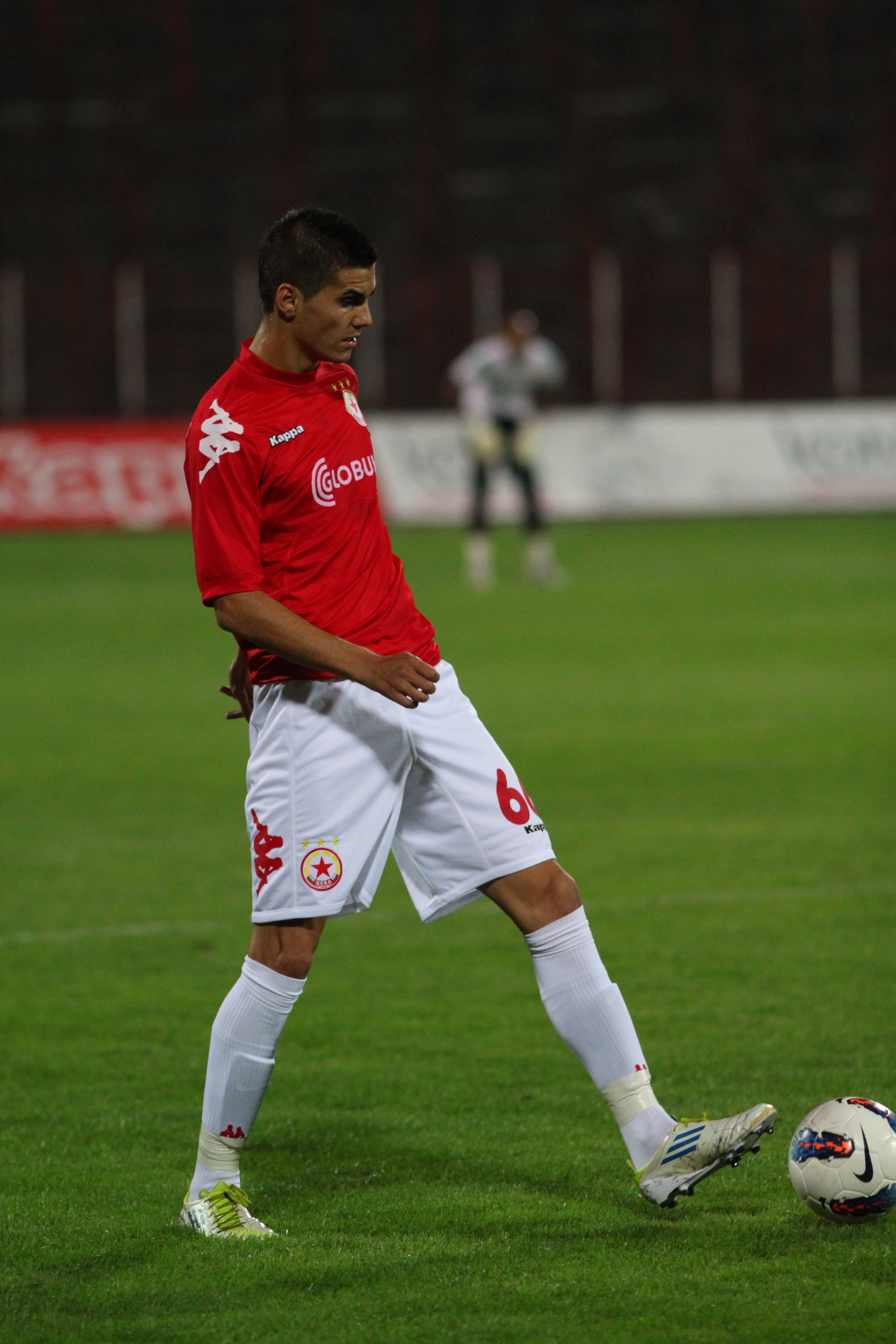

Personal information
- Full name: Plamen Nikolov Krachunov
- Date of birth: 11 January 1989 (age 37)
- Place of birth: Plovdiv, Bulgaria
- Height: 1.89 m (6 ft 2 in)
- Position: Centre-back

Youth career
- –2007: Maritsa Plovdiv

Senior career*
Years	Team	Apps	(Gls)
2007–2010	Maritsa Plovdiv	81	(7)
2010–2011	Lokomotiv Plovdiv	16	(1)
2011–2013	CSKA Sofia	47	(3)
2013	Lokomotiv Plovdiv	11	(2)
2014–2015	CSKA Sofia	12	(1)
2015	Slavia Sofia	8	(0)
2016	St. Johnstone	2	(0)
2016–2017	Ethnikos Achna	28	(1)
2017–2018	Sandecja Nowy Sącz	26	(0)
2019	Stomil Olsztyn	11	(1)
2019	Zagłębie Sosnowiec	9	(0)
2020	Lokomotiv Sofia	2	(0)
2020–2021	Etar	25	(1)
2021–2022	Lokomotiv Sofia	29	(2)
2022–2026	Arda	73	(3)
Total		380	(22)
- * Club domestic league appearances and goals

Plamen Nikolov Krachunov (Bulgarian: Пламен Николов Крачунов; born 11 January 1989) is a Bulgarian former professional footballer who played as a centre-back.

== Club career ==
=== Maritsa Plovdiv ===
Krachunov started playing football with Maritsa Plovdiv. He made his first-team debut on 18 August 2007, at 18 years, in a 3–0 away defeat to Kaliakra Kavarna and quickly became a regular starter of the team, as a centre back. His first goal came on 11 May 2008, in a 3–1 home win over Minyor Radnevo. During his first two seasons, he earned 50 appearances in the East B PFG, but Maritsa were relegated at the end of the 2008–09 season. After one season, playing for Maritsa in third league, he joined Lokomotiv Plovdiv.

=== Lokomotiv Plovdiv ===
After a short trial, on 6 July 2010, Krachunov signed a three-year contract with Lokomotiv. He made his A PFG debut in a 2–2 draw against Litex Lovech on 22 August, coming on as a substitute for Youness Bengelloun. Krachunov netted Lokomotiv's only goal in their Bulgarian Cup loss, a 2–1 defeat at Pirin Blagoevgrad on 6 April 2011. Four days later, he scored his first league goal for Lokomotiv, in a 1–1 draw against Montana.

=== CSKA Sofia ===
On 15 August 2011, reports linked Krachunov with a move to CSKA Sofia, adding depth to the position one day after Apostol Popov was lost for the season because of a knee injury. The following day, he completed his move to CSKA, on a three-year contract. He was handed the number 66 shirt.

He made his debut on 21 August, appearing as a substitute in a 2–1 win over Kaliakra Kavarna, and made his first start for the club in the following game against Montana. On 26 September, he scored his first goal for CSKA, scoring a header in CSKA's 4–1 league win over Vidima-Rakovski from a Spas Delev corner-kick. Krachunov then scored on 3 December in a Bulgarian Cup game against Spartak Pleven. On 15 March 2014, Krachunov scored a last-minute goal in the 1:0 win over Levski Sofia in an A PFG match. He joined Slavia Sofia in the summer of 2015, remaining with the "whites" until January 2016.

=== St Johnstone ===
On 22 February 2016, Krachunov signed a contract with Scottish Premiership side St Johnstone, after a successful trial period with the club.

=== Sandecja Nowy Sącz ===
On 5 July 2017, he signed a contract with Sandecja Nowy Sącz.

=== Etar Veliko Tarnovo ===
After a short stint with Lokomotiv Sofia, Krachunov joined Etar in June 2020.

=== Arda Kardzhali ===
In June 2022, Krachunov signed a contract with Arda Kardzhali.

== International career ==
In October 2011, Krachunov earned his first call-up to the Bulgaria national side for a friendly match against Ukraine and a Euro 2012 qualifier against Wales.

== Personal life ==
His brother Stefan Krachunov is also footballer.

== Career statistics ==
As of 29 October 2024

Appearances and goals by club, season and competition
Club	Season	League			Cup		Continental		Other		Total	
Club	Season	Division	Apps	Goals	Apps	Goals	Apps	Goals	Apps	Goals	Apps	Goals
Maritsa Plovdiv	2007–08	B Group	23	1	1	0	–		–		24	1
Maritsa Plovdiv	2008–09	B Group	27	0	2	0	–		–		29	0
Maritsa Plovdiv	2009–10	V Group	31	6	3	1	–		–		34	7
Maritsa Plovdiv	Total		81	7	6	1	0	0	0	0	87	8
Lokomotiv Plovdiv	2010–11	A Group	14	1	2	1	–		–		16	2
Lokomotiv Plovdiv	2011–12	A Group	2	0	0	0	–		–		2	0
Lokomotiv Plovdiv	Total		16	1	2	1	0	0	0	0	18	2
CSKA Sofia	2011–12	A Group	26	2	2	1	–		–		28	3
CSKA Sofia	2012–13	A Group	21	1	1	0	2	0	–		24	1
CSKA Sofia	Total		47	3	3	1	2	0	0	0	52	4
Lokomotiv Plovdiv	2013–14	A Group	11	2	1	0	–		–		12	2
CSKA Sofia	2013–14	A Group	8	1	0	0	–		–		8	1
CSKA Sofia	2014–15	A Group	4	0	0	0	2	0	–		6	0
CSKA Sofia	Total		12	1	0	0	2	0	0	0	14	1
Slavia Sofia	2015–16	A Group	8	0	0	0	–		–		8	0
St Johnstone	2015–16	Scottish Premiership	2	0	0	0	–		–		0	0
Ethnikos Achna	2016–17	Cypriot First Division	28	1	0	0	–		–		28	1
Sandecja Nowy Sącz	2017–18	Ekstraklasa	26	0	3	0	–		–		29	0
Stomil Olsztyn	2018–19	I liga	11	1	0	0	–		–		11	0
Zagłębie Sosnowiec	2019–20	I liga	9	0	0	0	–		–		9	0
Lokomotiv Sofia	2019–20	Second League	2	0	0	0	–		–		2	0
Etar	2019–20	Bulgarian First League	0	0	0	0	–		–		0	0
Etar	2020–21	Bulgarian First League	25	1	2	0	–		–		27	1
Etar	Total		25	1	2	0	2	0	0	0	27	1
Lokomotiv Sofia	2021–22	Bulgarian First League	29	2	1	0	–		–		30	2
Arda	2022–23	Bulgarian First League	16	0	0	0	–		0	0	16	0
Arda	2023–24	Bulgarian First League	29	1	3	0	–		–		32	1
Arda	2024–25	Bulgarian First League	14	2	1	0	–		0	0	15	2
Arda	Total		59	3	4	0	0	0	0	0	63	3
Career total			366	19	22	3	4	0	0	0	292	24
