= Joseph John Aquilina =

Maltese footballer and manager

Personal information
- Date of birth: 16 February 1957 (age 69)
- Place of birth: Malta
- Position: Midfielder

Team information
- Current team: Zurrieq FC

Senior career*
Years	Team	Apps	(Gls)
1976-1981	Sliema Wanderers	47	(1)
1981-1992	Floriana	143	(14)

International career
1979–1986	Malta	14	(0)

Managerial career
- 2002–2003: Marsaxlokk
- 2005: Valletta
- 2010: Żurrieq
- 2012: Pembroke Athleta
- 2018: Floriana
- * Club domestic league appearances and goals

Joseph John Aquilina (born 16 February 1957 in Malta) is a retired footballer and current manager. During his career, he played as a midfielder for Sliema Wanderers.

== International career ==
Aquilina made his debut for Malta in a June 1979 European Championship qualification match against Wales, coming on as a 78th-minute substitute for Ġużi Xuereb, and earned a total of 14 caps, scoring no goals. His final international was a November 1986 European Championship qualifier against Sweden.

== Managerial career ==
Aquilina has coached Marsaxlokk and Valletta. On 20 October 2010 Aquilina was appointed coach of Żurrieq.

Recently JJ was appointed as assistant coach at Floriana in order to assist senior team coach Nicolas Hernan Chiesa with his managerial duties.
