= Maltese National League 100 Anniversary Cup =

== First round ==
Team 1	Score	Team 2
Sirens	1–6	Mdina Knights
Siggiewi	3–0	Santa Lucia
Zejtun Corinthians	1–0	Gudja United
Mtarfa	1–1 (p.) 4–5	Attard
Kirkop United	4–1	Ghaxaq
Fgura United	0–2	Naxxar Lions
Qrendi	1–0	Pembroke Atleta
Swieqi United	0–4	Luqa St. Andrew's

== Second round ==
Team 1	Score	Team 2
Marsa	1–2	Gozo F.C.
St. Andrews	3–1	Mgarr United
Birzebbuga St.Peters	1–1 (p.) 4–2	Rabat Ajax
St.Venera Lightning	0–1	Zebbug Rangers
Naxxar Lions	2–0	Senglea Athletic
Gzira United	1–2	Lija Athletic
Zurrieq	1–1 (p.) 3–0	Xghajra Tornadoes
Gharghur	2–0	Kirkop United
Qrendi	0–0 (p.) 4–2	Kalkara
Zejtun Corinthians	3–0	Attard
Siggiewi	3–1	Luqa St. Andrew's
Mellieha	8–0	Mdina Knights

== Third round ==
Team 1	Score	Team 2
Naxxar Lions	3–2	Zejtun Corinthians
Marsaxlokk	0–0 (p.) 5–3	Birkirkara
Zurrieq	1–2	Mellieha
Sliema Wanderers	2–0	San Gwann
St. Patrick	0–0 (p.) 4–3	Zebbug Rangers
Floriana	2–0	Mqabba
St. Andrews	2–3	Gharghur
Siggiewi	1–3	Mosta
Melita	2–0	Pieta Hotspurs
Hibernians	1–1 (p.) 5–3	Qormi
Lija Athletic	1–0	Birzebbuga
Dingli Swallows	1–4	Vittoriosa Stars
Hamrun Spartans	3–0	St. George's
Msida SJ	0–5	Tarxien Rainbows
Balzan Youths	3–0	Qrendi
Valletta	7–0	Gozo F.C.

== Fourth round ==
Team 1	Score	Team 2
Hibernians	3–0	Marsaxlokk
Mellieha	1–4	Hamrun Spartans
Sliema Wanderers	4–1	St. Patrick
Gharghur	1–4	Mosta
Vittoriosa Stars	0–3	Valletta
Floriana	1–0	Melita
Naxxar Lions	1–3	Lija Athletic
Balzan Youths	1–5	Tarxien Rainbows

== Quarter Finals ==
Team 1	Score	Team 2
Valletta	2–0	Hibernians
Floriana	2–2 (p.) 6–5	Hamrun Spartans
Mosta	2–1	Sliema Wanderers
Tarxien Rainbows	2–0	Lija Athletic

== Semi Finals ==
Team 1	Score	Team 2
Valletta	3–1	Tarxien Rainbows
Floriana	3–1	Mosta

== Final ==
Team 1	Score	Team 2
Valletta	3–1	Floriana
