= Tássio =

Brazilian footballer (1984–2026)

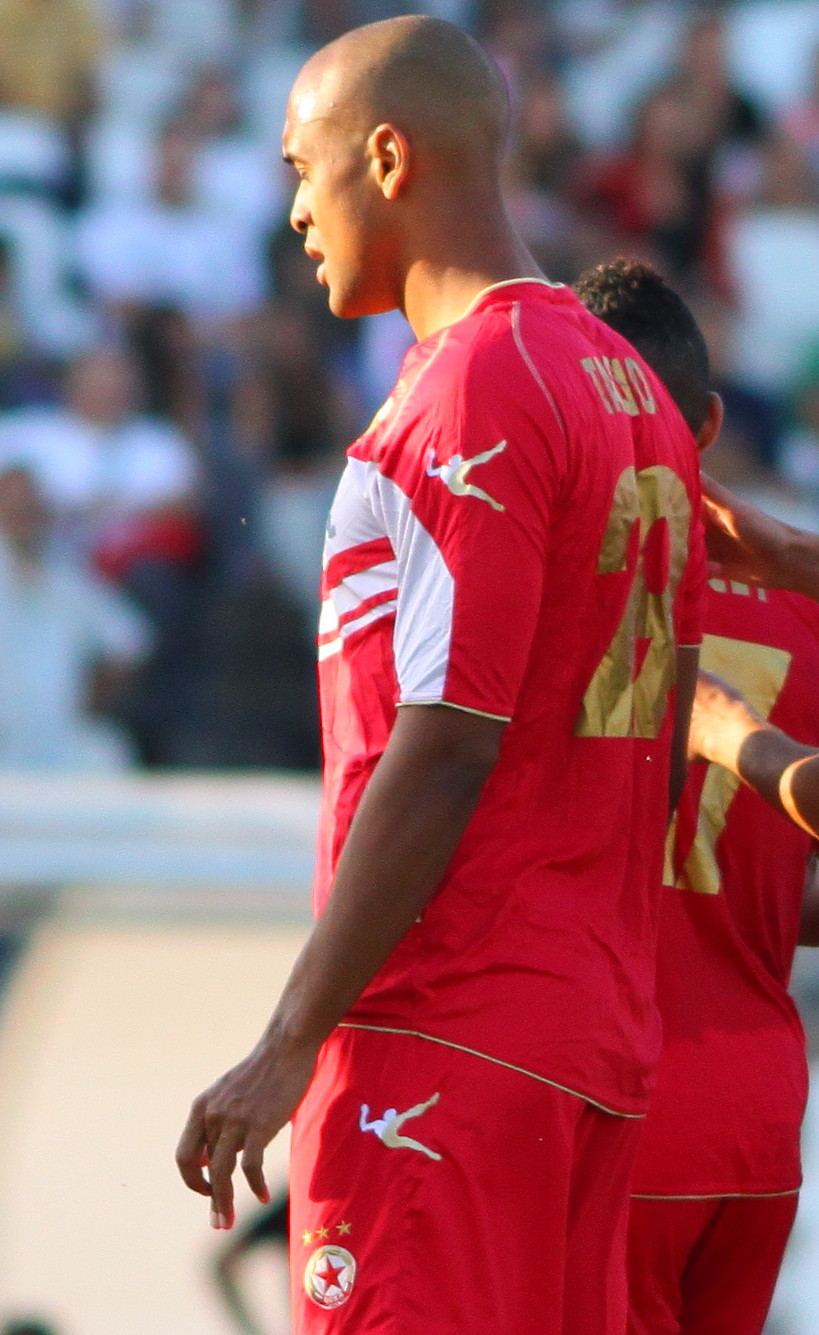

Personal information
- Full name: Tássio Maia dos Santos
- Date of birth: 8 October 1984
- Place of birth: Rio de Janeiro, Brazil
- Date of death: 29 July 2026 (aged 41)
- Place of death: Rio de Janeiro, Brazil
- Height: 1.93 m (6 ft 4 in)
- Position: Forward

Senior career*
Years	Team	Apps	(Gls)
2006	Caldense		
2007	Villa Rio		
2007–2008	Varzim	6	(0)
2008–2009	Chalkanoras Idaliou		
2009	Portuguesa-RJ		
2010	Volta Redonda	0	(0)
2010	Figueirense	7	(3)
2011	Volta Redonda	14	(7)
2011	Busan IPark		
2011	Anagennisi Epanomi	5	(3)
2012	Resende	0	(0)
2012	Lokomotiv Plovdiv	?	(5)
2012	CSKA Sofia	11	(4)
2013	Boa Esporte	3	(1)
2013	Betim	4	(1)
2014	Bragantino	10	(5)
2014	Wuhan Zall	7	(3)
2015	Botafogo	0	(0)
2016	Hatta Club	22	(26)
2016–2017	Ajman Club		
2018	Bangu	0	(0)
2018	Saprissa	19	(5)
2019	Madureira	0	(0)
2019	Ferroviário	0	(0)
- * Club domestic league appearances and goals

Tássio Maia dos Santos (8 October 1984 – 29 July 2026), or simply Tássio, was a Brazilian professional footballer who played as a forward.

== Career ==
On 20 February 2011, Tássio joined South Korean club Busan IPark. Busan released him on 8 June 2011.

On 27 June 2012, Tássio joined Bulgarian club Lokomotiv Plovdiv. He scored on his Lokomotiv debut on 19 July 2012, scoring the late equaliser in a 4–4 draw against Vitesse Arnhem in the Europa League. A week later, his contract was terminated by mutual consent.

On 27 July 2012, Tássio signed a contract with CSKA Sofia.

== Death ==
Tássio died on 29 July 2026, at the age of 41, after being struck by a wall which fell during strong winds in Rio de Janeiro.
