= Milen Ivanov =

Bulgarian footballer

Personal information
- Full name: Milen Georgiev Ivanov
- Date of birth: 10 May 1993 (age 33)
- Place of birth: Bulgaria, Sofia
- Height: 1.81 m (5 ft 11 1/2 in)
- Positions: Attacking midfielder; winger

Team information
- Current team: Marek Dupnitsa
- Number: 77

Youth career
- 2004–2012: CSKA Sofia

Senior career*
Years	Team	Apps	(Gls)
2012–2013	CSKA Sofia	1	(0)
2013–2015	Chepinets	54	(7)
2016	Sofia 2010		
2016	Tsarsko Selo	12	(1)
2017	Chepinets		
2017–2018	CSKA 1948	14	(0)
2018–2019	Germanea	34	(2)
2019–2020	Oborishte	16	(0)
2020–	Marek Dupnitsa	118	(16)
- * Club domestic league appearances and goals as of 1 July 2024

Milen Georgiev Ivanov (Bulgarian: Милен Георгиев Иванов; born 10 May 1993) is a Bulgarian footballer who plays as a midfielder for Marek Dupnitsa.
