= Atanas Drenovichki =

Bulgarian footballer

Personal information
- Full name: Atanas Antonov Drenovichki
- Date of birth: 19 June 1990 (age 36)
- Place of birth: Gotse Delchev, Bulgaria
- Height: 1.80 m (5 ft 11 in)
- Position: Left back

Team information
- Current team: Slivnishki geroi

Youth career
- Pirin Gotse Delchev

Senior career*
Years	Team	Apps	(Gls)
2008–2011	Slavia Sofia	20	(0)
2011	→ Ludogorets Razgrad (loan)	9	(0)
2012	Vidima-Rakovski	9	(1)
2012–2013	Pirin Gotse Delchev	29	(0)
2013–	Slivnishki geroi	0	(0)

International career^{‡}
2010–2011	Bulgaria U21	10	(0)
- * Club domestic league appearances and goals as of 30 May 2013 ‡ National team caps and goals as of 4 November 2011

Atanas Drenovichki (Bulgarian: Атанас Дреновички; born 19 June 1990 in Gotse Delchev) is a Bulgarian football defender who plays for Slivnishki geroi.

His Height is 1.80 m (5 ft 11 in) and his weight is 68 kg (150 lb). He plays in defence, originally on the left side and he can also play on the right side and in center.

== Career ==
Born in Gotse Delchev Drenovichki started play football in local team Pirin. In June 2008 he moved to Slavia Sofia and signed his first professional contract.

== International career ==
In the beginning of 2010, Drenovichki was called up to the Bulgaria under-21 team for the first time, making his competitive debut on 3 March 2010, in a 0–2 loss against Montenegro U21.
