= Edward Aquilina =

Maltese football manager

Personal information
- Date of birth: 2 September 1945
- Place of birth: Sliema, Crown Colony of Malta
- Date of death: 6 June 2021 (aged 75)
- Place of death: Sliema, Malta
- Position: Forward

Senior career*
Years	Team	Apps	(Gls)
1960–1961	Melita		
1962–1967	Sliema Wanderers	53	(12)
1967	Pittsburgh Phantoms	4	(0)
1967–1970	Hibernians	34	(4)
1970–1979	Sliema Wanderers	114	(17)

International career
1966–1976	Malta	12	(1)

Managerial career
- 1979-1983: Sliema Wanderers
- Qormi
- Senglea Athletic
- Marsa
- 1994–1998: Valletta
- 2002–2006: Sliema Wanderers
- * Club domestic league appearances and goals

Edward Aquilina (2 September 1945 – 6 June 2021) was a Maltese football player and manager.

His career as a forward was mostly spent in two spells at Sliema Wanderers, winning the Maltese Premier League six times and a further title for Hibernians. He played 12 games for the Malta national team, scoring the winning goal on his debut in 1966.

As a manager, Aquilina won the league, Maltese FA Trophy and Maltese Super Cup in 1996–97 for Valletta, and three consecutive league titles for Sliema Wanderers from 2003 to 2005.

== Club career ==
Born in Sliema, Aquilina began playing in the third division for Melita in 1960–61 before joining Sliema Wanderers. He spent 15 years there over two spells, winning the Maltese Premier League six times and the Maltese FA Trophy three times. In 1967, he played for the Pittsburgh Phantoms in the National Professional Soccer League, scoring no goals in four games.

Aquilina won another league title with Hibernians. In the 1971–72 European Cup first round, back at Sliema Wanderers, he scored once and assisted all three goals of Ronnie Cocks' hat-trick in a 4–0 win against ÍA on 26 September; in 2007, the Times of Malta reflected that Aquilina played "the game of his life". He retired in 1979.

== International career ==
Aquilina made his international debut for Malta on 13 February 1966, the first match since independence, and scored the only goal of a friendly win over Libya at Manoel Island Football Ground. He made a total of 12 appearances, ending with a 2–2 draw with the same opponents on 10 March 1976, and scored no further goals.

== Managerial career ==
Aquilina was manager for 243 games in the Maltese Premier League, starting at Sliema Wanderers. He then led Qormi, Senglea Athletic and Marsa in the First Division. As manager of Valletta from 1994 to 1998, he led the capital city club to the league title, FA Trophy and Maltese Super Cup. From 2002 to 2006 he managed Sliema Wanderers again, and achieved three consecutive league titles from 2003 to 2005, which he considered his greatest feat, and had previously won three in succession as a player for the same club.

== Death ==
Aquilina died at his home in Sliema on 6 June 2021, aged 75.
