= 1973–74 Maltese Premier League =

Maltese First Division
- Season: 1973–74
- Champions: Valletta F.C. (9th title)
- Relegated: Qormi F.C. Hamrun Spartans F.C.
- European Cup: Valletta F.C.
- European Cup Winners' Cup: Sliema Wanderers F.C.
- UEFA Cup: Hibernians F.C.
- Matches played: 91
- Goals scored: 178 (1.96 per match)

The 1973–74 Maltese First Division was the 59th season of top-tier football in Malta. It was contested by 10 teams, and Valletta F.C. won the championship.

== League standings ==
Pos	Team	Pld	W	D	L	GF	GA	GD	Pts	Qualification
1	Valletta F.C. (C)	18	12	4	2	23	8	+15	28	Qualification for the European Cup
2	Hibernians F.C.	18	10	4	4	21	9	+12	24	Qualification for the UEFA Cup
3	Floriana F.C.	18	7	7	4	32	21	+11	21	
4	Sliema Wanderers F.C.	18	8	5	5	25	14	+11	21	Qualification for the European Cup Winners' Cup (Note: Sliema Wanderers qualified for the Cup Winners' Cup as Maltese FA Trophy Winners)
5	Zebbug Rangers	18	4	7	7	8	13	−5	15	
6	Marsa F.C.	18	5	5	8	19	25	−6	15	
7	Gzira United	18	5	5	8	16	23	−7	15	
8	Birkirkara F.C.	18	3	8	7	12	19	−7	14	
9	Qormi F.C. (R)	18	5	4	9	10	23	−13	14	Relegation
10	Hamrun Spartans F.C. (R)	18	2	9	7	11	22	−11	13	Relegation

Source: rsssf.com
(C) Champions; (R) Relegated

=== Relegation tie-breaker ===
With both Birkirkara and Qormi level on 14 points, a play-off match was conducted to Finish 9th place and be Relegated.

Birkirkara F.C.	1–0	Qormi F.C.	Gżira
			Stadium: Empire Stadium

== Results ==
Home \ Away	BKR	FRN	GŻI	HIB	ĦMR	MRS	QOR	SLM	VLT	ZEB
Birkirkara	—	0–2	0–1	0–0	4–1	0–2	0–1	1–1	0–1	0–0
Floriana	1–1	—	1–0	2–1	3–0	5–5	7–1	1–1	2–0	1–1
Gżira United	2–2	1–1	—	0–1	1–1	1–0	1–0	2–2	0–3	3–1
Hibernians	0–1	1–0	2–1	—	0–0	1–0	2–0	2–1	0–1	2–0
Ħamrun Spartans	1–1	0–0	3–1	0–4	—	0–0	1–1	1–2	0–1	1–0
Marsa	4–1	2–4	1–2	1–1	1–0	—	0–0	1–0	0–2	1–0
Qormi	0–1	3–1	1–0	0–1	1–1	0–0	—	0–3	0–3	1–0
Sliema Wanderers	0–0	2–0	3–0	0–2	0–0	4–0	0–1	—	2–1	3–1
Valletta	2–0	1–1	1–0	2–1	1–1	2–1	1–0	1–0	—	0–0
Żebbuġ Rangers	0–0	1–0	0–0	0–0	1–0	2–0	1–0	0–1	0–0	—

Legend: Blue = home team win; Yellow = draw; Red = away team win.
