= Jérémie Rodrigues =

French footballer (born 1980)

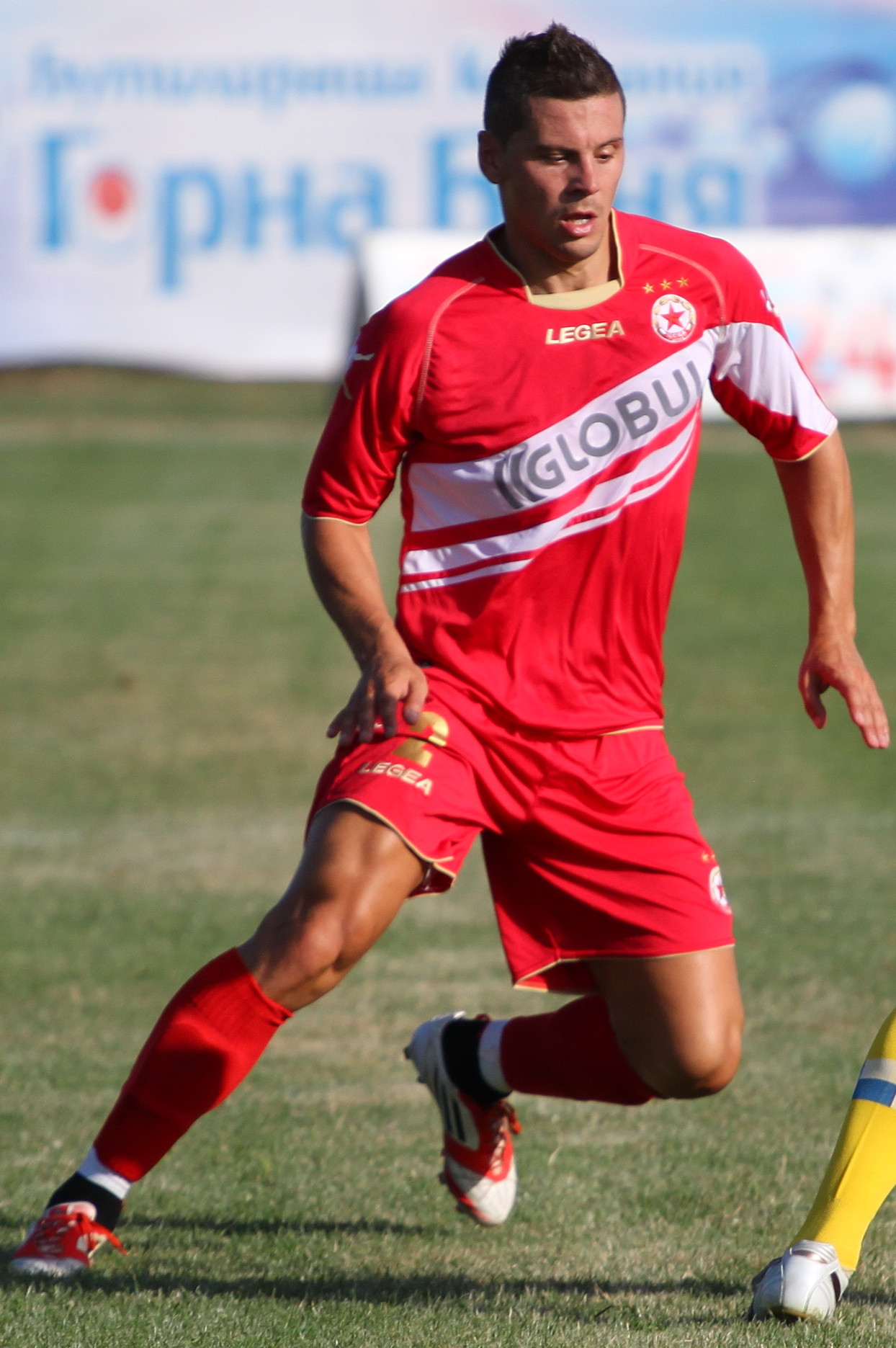

Personal information
- Date of birth: 1 November 1980 (age 46)
- Place of birth: Schiltigheim, France
- Height: 1.72 m (5 ft 8 in)
- Position: Right back

Senior career*
Years	Team	Apps	(Gls)
2001–2005	Besançon RC	112	(5)
2005–2007	Gueugnon	54	(0)
2007–2008	Boulogne	17	(0)
2008–2009	AEL Limassol	8	(0)
2009–2010	Nea Salamina	20	(0)
2010–2012	Lokomotiv Plovdiv	48	(2)
2012	CSKA Sofia	1	(0)
2013–2014	Lokomotiv Sofia	0	(0)
2014–2016	Sarre-Union		
- * Club domestic league appearances and goals

Jérémie Rodrigues (born 1 November 1980) is a French former professional footballer who played as a right-back.

== Career ==
Rodrigues started his career playing for Besançon RC before signing a contract with Ligue 2 club Gueugnon in 2005. After representing Boulogne and stints with clubs from Cyprus, Rodrigues relocated to Bulgaria in 2010.

== Career statistics ==
As of 20 June 2012

Appearances and goals by club, season and competition
Club	Season	League		National cup		League cup		Europe		Total	
Club	Season	Apps	Goals	Apps	Goals	Apps	Goals	Apps	Goals	Apps	Goals
Gueugnon	2005–06	27	0	0	0	0	0	—		27	0
Gueugnon	2006–07	27	0	0	0	1	0	—		28	0
Gueugnon	Total	54	0	0	0	1	0	0	0	55	0
Boulogne	2007–08	17	0	2	0	3	0	—		22	0
Lokomotiv Plovdiv	2010–11	26	1	3	0	—		—		29	1
Lokomotiv Plovdiv	2011–12	22	1	4	1	—		—		26	2
Lokomotiv Plovdiv	Total	48	2	7	1	0	0	0	0	55	3
Career total		119	2	9	1	4	0	0	0	132	3
