= Ahmed Hikmet =

Bulgarian footballer

Personal information
- Full name: Ahmed Hikmet Hasan
- Date of birth: 5 October 1984 (age 42)
- Place of birth: Shumen, Bulgaria
- Height: 1.78 m (5 ft 10 in)
- Position: Midfielder

Team information
- Current team: Beroe (manager)

Senior career*
Years	Team	Apps	(Gls)
2003–2007	Volov Shumen	44	(2)
2007	Spartak Varna	15	(1)
2008–2009	Beroe Stara Zagora	24	(0)
2010–2011	Montana	11	(1)
2011–2012	Vidima-Rakovski	24	(1)
2012	Etar 1924	9	(2)
2013	Minyor Pernik	11	(0)
2013–2014	Wacker Neutraubling	24	(6)
2014	Chernomorets Burgas	12	(0)
2015–2016	Chernomorets Balchik	36	(8)
2016–2017	Hebar Pazardzhik	?	(?)
2017–2018	Chernomorets Balchik	34	(1)

Managerial career
- 2017–2019: Chernomorets Balchik (assistant)
- 2019–2020: CSKA 1948 (youth)
- 2020: Yantra Gabrovo (director of youth department)
- 2021–2023: Levski Sofia (youth)
- 2024: Akademik Svishtov
- 2025: Yambol
- 2025–2026: Sportist Svoge
- 2026–: Beroe
- * Club domestic league appearances and goals

Ahmed Hikmet (Bulgarian: Ахмед Хикмет; born 5 October 1984) is a Bulgarian former footballer who played as a midfielder and now manager, who is currently manager of Beroe.
