= Apostol Popov =

Bulgarian footballer

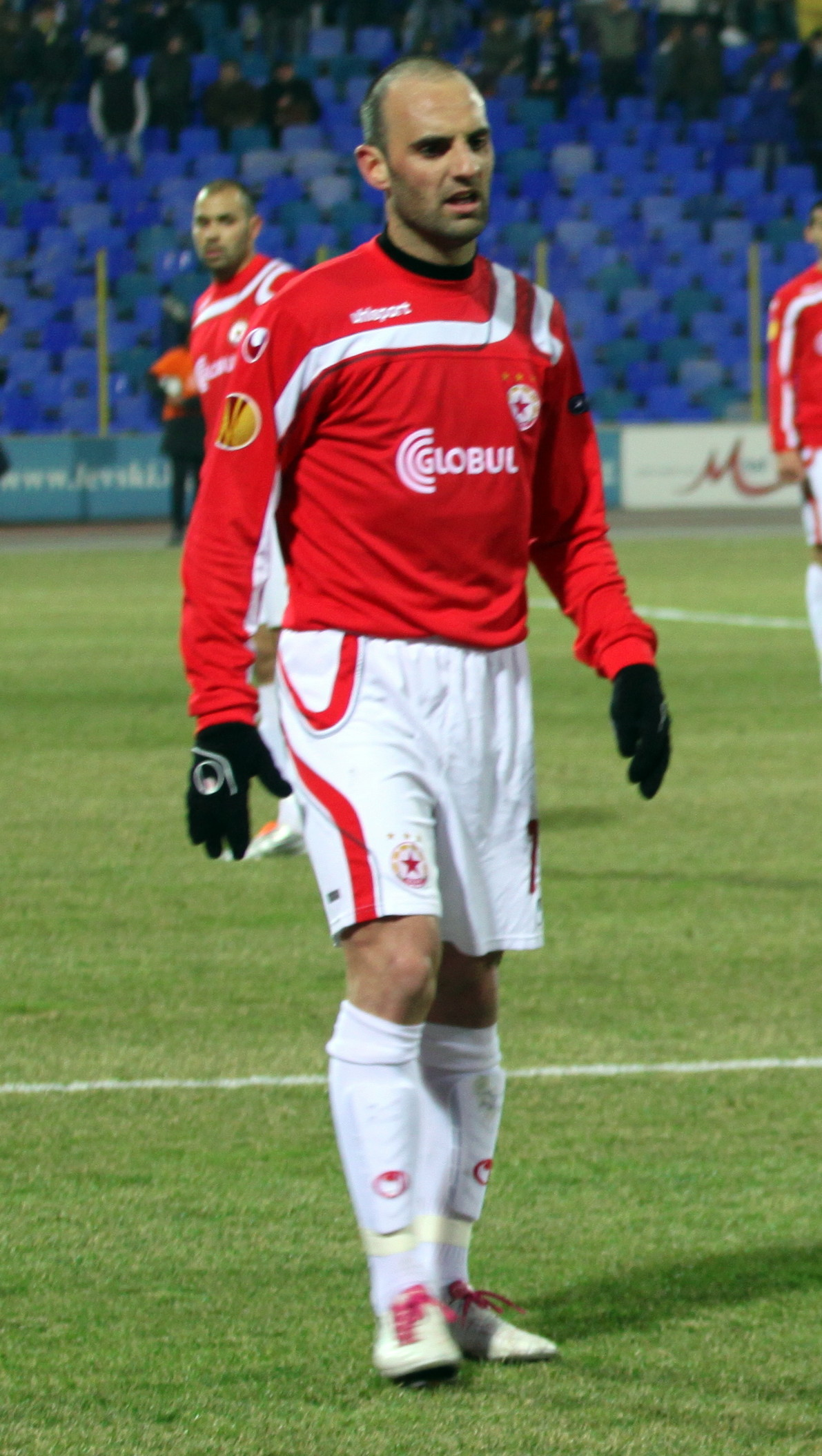
- Popov with CSKA Sofia in 2011

Personal information
- Full name: Apostol Aleksandrov Popov
- Date of birth: 22 December 1982 (age 43)
- Place of birth: Plovdiv, Bulgaria
- Height: 1.84 m (6 ft 0 in)
- Positions: Centre-back; right-back

Team information
- Current team: Maritsa (youth coach)

Senior career*
Years	Team	Apps	(Gls)
2001–2005	Spartak Plovdiv	84	(5)
2005–2006	Belite Orli	35	(0)
2007	Haskovo	22	(1)
2008–2009	Botev Plovdiv	40	(1)
2009–2015	CSKA Sofia	116	(4)
2015–2018	Universitatea Craiova	57	(2)
2018–2019	CSKA 1948	26	(0)
2019	Botev Vratsa	8	(0)
2020	Vitosha Bistritsa	2	(1)
2020–2021	Maritsa Plovdiv	1	(0)
Total		389	(14)

International career
2011–2014	Bulgaria	4	(0)

Managerial career
- 2021–2022: Maritsa (sporting director)
- 2022: CSKA 1948 III (assistant)
- 2023–2024: Maritsa (assistant)
- * Club domestic league appearances and goals

Apostol Aleksandrov Popov (Bulgarian: Апостол Попов; born 22 December 1982) is a Bulgarian former professional footballer who currently works as a youth coach for Maritsa.

== Career ==
=== Early career ===
Popov began his career with Spartak Plovdiv and made his first team debut in 2001. Then he played two and a half years in the second division with Belite Orli and Haskovo, before joined Botev Plovdiv in December 2007.

=== Botev Plovdiv ===
Popov signed with Botev Plovdiv as a free agent on 27 December 2007 on a two-and-a-half-year deal. He was signed to replace Nikolay Domakinov at Botev and added an extra dimension with his heading ability from set-pieces. He made his official debut in the A PFG with Botev Plovdiv in a match against Spartak Varna on 1 March 2008, playing full 90 minutes. The result of the match was a 2–0 win for Botev.

He scored his first goal on 27 September 2008, opening the scoring in a 5–0 home win over Belasitsa Petrich. On 14 March 2009, Popov played as a goalkeeper for the final minutes in the league game against Levski Sofia after regular goalkeeper Lilcho Arsov was sent off in the 86th minute. He made one good save during the minutes to the end of the game, but Botev lost 0–1.

=== CSKA Sofia ===
On 24 July 2009, Popov joined CSKA Sofia on a three-year contract. He made his debut on 23 August, in a 2–0 away win against Sportist Svoge. His first goal came on 10 April 2010, netting the third in a 4–2 win over Sliven 2000 at Hadzhi Dimitar Stadium.

On 13 August 2011, in the second league game of 2011–12 season, against Chernomorets Burgas, Popov ruptured his anterior cruciate ligament and received surgery a week later. His recovery was said to take up to six months. He made his comeback for CSKA from a serious knee injury on 22 April 2012, in a 4–1 win over Cherno More Varna, coming on for the last 2 minutes. This season he played only 6 matches.

In the following campaign, Popov formed a partnership with Plamen Krachunov in the centre of defence, appearing in 26 league matches. He was substituted only once during the entire league season. On 26 July 2012, he scored his first-ever European goal in a 1–1 home draw against Slovenian side ND Mura 05 in the Second qualifying round of 2012–13 Europa League.

On 17 July 2013, Popov signed a new two-year contract with CSKA. After serving mainly as a centre back for the majority of his career, during 2013–14 season he started to be employed as the regular right back by CSKA head coach, Stoycho Mladenov.

On 8 March 2014, Popov again played as a goalkeeper for a few minutes in the 1:0 win over Levski Sofia after Raïs M'Bolhi had been sent off in the closing stages of the match.

On 27 July 2014, Popov made his 100th league appearance for CSKA in a 2–0 win against Levski Sofia.

=== Universitatea Craiova ===
On 6 June 2015, Popov signed a two-year contract with Universitatea Craiova.

=== CSKA 1948 ===
On 13 June 2018, Popov joined Second League club CSKA 1948.

== International career ==
In August 2011, Popov was named in the Bulgarian squad for the first time for a friendly against Belarus. He made his debut in the game on 11 August, coming on for the last 7 minutes in place of Chavdar Yankov as Bulgaria loss 1–0 at Dinamo Stadium in Minsk.

Three years later, on 9 September 2014, in Bulgaria's first match of UEFA Euro 2016 qualification, Popov made his competitive debut in a 2–1 victory away to Azerbaijan at Bakcell Arena, Baku, playing full 90 minutes in the centre of defence.

== Career statistics ==
=== Club ===
As of 31 May 2015

Appearances and goals by club, season and competition
Club	Season	League			National cup (Note: Includes Bulgarian Cup)		Europe		Other		Total	
Club	Season	Division	Apps	Goals	Apps	Goals	Apps	Goals	Apps	Goals	Apps	Goals
Belite orli	2005–06	B Group	22	0	0	0	—		—		22	0
Belite orli	2006–07	B Group	13	0	0	0	—		—		13	0
Belite orli	Total		35	0	0	0	0	0	0	0	35	0
Haskovo	2006–07	B Group	9	0	0	0	—		—		9	0
Haskovo	2007–08	B Group	13	1	0	0	—		—		13	1
Haskovo	Total		22	1	0	0	0	0	0	0	22	1
Botev Plovdiv	2007–08	A Group	15	0	0	0	—		—		15	0
Botev Plovdiv	2008–09	A Group	25	1	1	0	—		—		26	1
Botev Plovdiv	Total		40	1	1	0	0	0	0	0	41	1
CSKA Sofia	2009–10	A Group	13	1	3	0	2 (Note: Appearance(s) in UEFA Europa League)	0	—		18	1
CSKA Sofia	2010–11	A Group	20	2	4	0	1	0	—		25	2
CSKA Sofia	2011–12	A Group	6	0	0	0	0	0	1 (Note: Appearance in Bulgarian Supercup)	0	7	0
CSKA Sofia	2012–13	A Group	26	0	5	0	2	1	—		33	1
CSKA Sofia	2013–14	A Group	33	1	2	0	—		—		35	1
CSKA Sofia	2014–15	A Group	18	0	1	0	2	0	—		21	0
CSKA Sofia	Total		116	4	15	0	7	1	1	0	139	5
Career total			213	6	16	0	7	1	1	0	237	7

== Honours ==
CSKA Sofia

- Bulgarian Cup: 2011
- Bulgarian Supercup: 2011

Universitatea Craiova

- Cupa României: 2018
