= Ġużi Xuereb =

Maltese footballer

Personal information
- Full name: Joseph Xuereb
- Date of birth: 1 July 1957 (age 69)
- Place of birth: Tarxien, Malta
- Position: Midfielder

Senior career*
Years	Team	Apps	(Gls)
1974–1991	Hibernians	185	(54)

International career
1979-1982	Malta	14	(1)
- * Club domestic league appearances and goals

Ġużi Xuereb (born 9 February 1965 in Tarxien) is a Maltese retired footballer.

== Club career ==
Ġużi played the majority of his career for Hibernians as a midfielder.

== International career ==
Xuereb made his debut for Malta in a February 1979 European Championship qualification match against West Germany and earned a total of 14 caps, scoring 1 goal. His final international was a June 1982 European Championship qualification match against Iceland.

== Honours ==
- Maltese Premier League: 1979, 1981,1982
- Maltese FA Trophy: 1979, 1982
