= Sebastián Sciorilli =

Argentine footballer

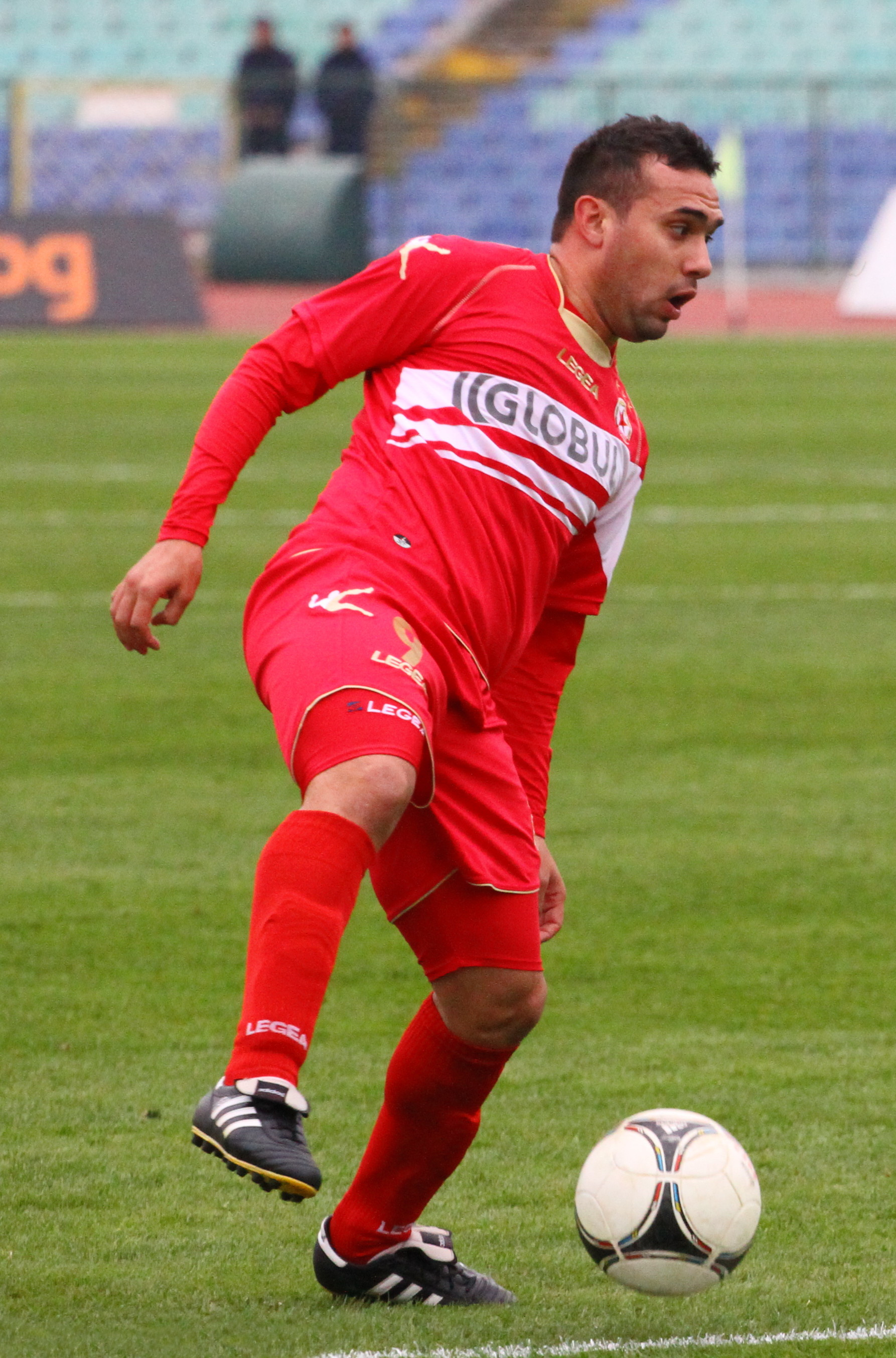

Personal information
- Full name: Sebastián Héctor Sciorilli
- Date of birth: February 5, 1989 (age 37)
- Place of birth: Buenos Aires, Argentina
- Height: 1.69 m (5 ft 7 in)
- Position: Attacking midfielder

Team information
- Current team: Comunicaciones (assistant)

Senior career*
Years	Team	Apps	(Gls)
2007–2012	River Plate	5	(0)
2008–2009	→ Colón (loan)	18	(1)
2009–2010	→ Chacarita Juniors (loan)	14	(1)
2010–2011	→ Independiente Rivadavia (loan)	10	(0)
2012	→ América Mineiro (loan)	3	(0)
2012–2013	CSKA Sofia	5	(0)
2013–2015	CSD Rangers	35	(5)
2014–2015	→ Atlanta (loan)	10	(1)
2015–2016	Almirante Brown	15	(2)
2016–2017	Sol de América	23	(0)
2017–2018	Chaco For Ever	15	(1)
2018–2019	JJ Urquiza	12	(0)
2019–2020	San Martín Burzaco	12	(0)

Managerial career
- 2022–: Comunicaciones (assistant)
- * Club domestic league appearances and goals as of 20:22, 8 August 2022 (UTC)

Sebastián Héctor Sciorilli (born February 5, 1989, in Buenos Aires) is a retired Argentine footballer.

== Club career ==
Sciorilli made his debut as an 18-year-old on 8 April 2007 with River Plate against Belgrano. He would eventually appear in four games during the 2006–2007 season.

In 2008, he was part of the squad that won the Clausura tournament, but he only featured in one of the games.

In 2008, he was loaned to Colón de Santa Fe and in 2009 he joined newly promoted Chacarita Juniors on loan.

On 29 December 2011, it was announced Sciorilli would move to Brazilian Série B outfit América Mineiro on loan for a one year with option to purchase 50 percent of their economic rights at the end of this 2012.

On 17 August 2012 Sciorilli signed with CSKA Sofia two years contract. He made his debut in 0–0 away draw against Cherno More in A PFG.

== Coaching career ==
In October 2020, Sciorilli announced his retirement. At the end of December 2021, Sciorilli was appointed assistant coach of Germán Cavalieri at Club Comunicaciones.

== Honours ==
River Plate

- Primera División: 2008 Clausura
