= Valletta F.C. =

Association football club in Malta

Valletta
- Full name: Valletta Football Club
- Nicknames: Lilywhites; Tal-Palestina; Citizens
- Founded: 1943; 83 years ago
- Chairman: Claudio Grech
- Manager: Thane Micallef
- League: Maltese Premier League
- 2026–27: Maltese Premier League, 4th of 12
- Website: www.vallettafc.net
Home colours	Away colours

Valletta F.C. is a professional football club based in Valletta, the capital city of Malta. The club currently competes in the Maltese Premier League. The club was founded in 1943 after a merge of Valletta Prestons, Valletta St. Paul's and Valletta United, the latter being a two-time league winner before the Second World War.

Considered one of the most supported and successful clubs in Maltese football, the club has won 25 league titles, 15 FA Trophies and a record 14 Super Cups. During the 2021–22 season the club was sponsored by Meridianbet.

== History ==
There is no clear evidence on when Valletta F.C. started, hence the fact that Valletta possessed two clubs at that era. The foundation of Valletta F.C. was laid with the creation of the Valletta United team. Valletta United was known as the "team of the square" since the club was located in St. George's Square. Valletta United represented the city from 1904 to 1932.

The city of Valletta in Malta has a long footballing history, between 1886 and 1919 at some point or another, around fourteen teams had competed representing the city. Amongst these early teams included the popular Boys Empire League, Valletta College, St. George's Square, Dockyard Albion and Malta Athletic Club.

An early step in the history of the current club was the founding of Valletta United Football Club in 1903 by local youngsters. Despite their enthusiasm for the game which had been brought to the island by the British, the youngsters had a rough start with limited supplies. They cut their white trousers into long shorts and dyed their shirts into that of the club colours (brown, with yellow sleeves) for their uniforms.

The Ditch at Porte des Bombes, which itself had been the scene of the first ever recorded Maltese football match in 1886, was chosen to host Valletta United's first match on 9 January 1904. United faced off against a team from the Collegiate School and won 1–0 with a strike from a forward named L. Agius. The full Valletta United team that day included;

- M.H. Laferla (Captain)
- P. Ferrante
- E. Galea

- E. Vella
- L. Agius
- L. Preziosi

- C. Vella
- V. Casolani
- R. Vadala

- V. Camilleri
- L. Castaldi

The club soon found a more permanent home at St. George's Square, just opposite the Grandmaster's Palace in Valletta; they gained the nickname "the team of the square" because of this. Valletta first gained silverware during the 1914–15 season, when they won both the Cousis Shield and the Maltese League championship, it was only the fifth season the league had been competed in Malta.

Much of Maltese football was dominated by Floriana and Sliema Wanderers up until the Second World War, Valletta attempted to upset the status quo several times; they won the Cousis Shield for the second time in 1920–21 and finished as runners-up in the Maltese League during both 1925–26 and 1926–27. During their last season, Valletta United upset the two main clubs in Malta of the time, by winning the Maltese League in 1931–32, however they did not enter the following season.

Although Sliema and Floriana dominated the local scene in those times, by winning these trophies it was Valletta United that started to break into this duopoly and induce greater competition. Valletta United were very active in the Championship of the first division and in fact played 97 games.

During the period that Valletta United played within the Malta Football Association (i.e., from 1909 to 1932), Valletta United won the championship in 1931–32. However, for some reason in the following season, Valletta United disappeared from the football scene and thus the monopoly of Sliema and Floriana football clubs recommenced.

Valletta United was not the only team from the city that played in the highest Division of the M.F.A. In the 1925–26 and the 1926–27 seasons there were Valletta Rovers who played in the highest Division of the M.F.A., then in the season 1937–38 and 1938–39 there was Valletta City.

=== The winning of five cups in one season ===
In 1996–97 Valletta F.C. won all five competitions that the Maltese football offers. This was done by succeeding to win the Premier League, Rothmans Trophy, Super Five Cup, Lowenbrau Cup and Super Cup.

=== The historic season – 2000–01 – Six cups in one season ===
In the season 2000–01, Valletta F.C. succeeded in breaking their own record from 1996 to 1997. This time they won the six competitions offered by the M.F.A. This particular season there was an additional one, namely the Centenary Cup. It had been added to celebrate the 100th Anniversary of the M.F.A.

=== 2007–08: Champions again ===
Hope for their first trophy in seven years was a huge thought running through Valletta fans in the summer of 2007. Valletta spent a lot of money in the transfer market and expectations were high. Valletta began the season in the worst possible fashion, with a 3–2 defeat to Eternal rivals, Floriana. Valletta's poor start continued with a 1–1 draw against Hibernians, defeat to Sliema, a 0–0 draw with Hamrun Spartans and Msida respectively. However, eventually Valletta hit good form with a 1–0 win over Birkirkara, a 7–0 trashing over champions Marsaxlokk and they gained revenge over Floriana with a 4–0 win on 8 December. After wins over Msida, Mqabba, Hamrun, Sliema and Marsaxlokk the club showed its winning pedigree. Valletta headed to the final round of the season on a high note.

Valletta won their 19th Premier League title after Marsaxlokk failed to beat Birkirkara on Saturday 3 May after a very successful Championship Pool campaign. However, with the title in the bag the long unbeaten streak soon came to an end, and the season ended with a number of defeats. The team also failed to reach the U*Bet F.A. Trophy 2008 final, after losing 4–2 to rivals Birkirkara in the semi-final. But except for the early stages and the post-championship games, Valletta had been the most consistent side.

=== Consecutive titles ===
Valletta won the 2010–11 BOV Premier League as an unbeaten team which brought the 20th title to Valletta FC's history. Valletta won the 2011–12 BOV Premier League with two matches still to go after beating Sliema Wanderers 3–0, this was the 21st title in the history of Valletta. They were champions of Malta again in 2013–14, 2015–16 and 2 year in a row 2017–18 and 2018–19 for a total of 25 titles.

=== Relegation and subsequent promotion ===
Valletta were relegated for the first time in the club's history in the 2023–24 Maltese Premier League. Valletta spent most of the season in the bottom half of the league. Towards the end of the season, a 1–1 draw against Ħamrun Spartans and a 1–0 win against Balzan showed a glimmer of hope for salvation. This did not happen however and a 4–0 defeat against Naxxar Lions condemned Valletta to relegation.

In the 2024–25 Maltese Challenge League, the club secured promotion back to the top division, finishing at the top of the table with only one defeat during the season.

== Players ==
=== Current squad ===
As of 14 June, 2026

Note: Flags indicate national team as defined under FIFA eligibility rules; some limited exceptions apply. Players may hold more than one non-FIFA nationality.

No.	Pos.	Nation	Player
1	GK	SKN	Julani Archibald
3	DF	MLT	Matthias Ellul
4	DF	BIH	Ermin Bičakčić
8	FW	MLT	Andrea Zammit
9	FW	BRA	Bruno Gomes
10	MF	MLT	Brandon Paiber
11	MF	MLT	Jake Azzopardi
13	GK	MLT	Liam Frendo
19	FW	POR	Diogo Tavares
20	MF	MLT	Yannick Yankam

No.	Pos.	Nation	Player
21	MF	CRO	Roko Prša
23	MF	MNE	Petar Sekulović
32	FW	BRA	Alex Tanque
33	DF	GER	Emmanuel Mbende
44	DF	MLT	Neil Micallef
55	DF	SRB	Sava Radić
77	FW	ANG	Thaylor
80	MF	MLT	Keyon Ewurum
90	GK	BRA	Adilson Maringá
95	DF	ARG	Manuel Morello
—	MF	FRA	Mohamed Sylla

=== Youth Players in use ===
Note: Flags indicate national team as defined under FIFA eligibility rules; some limited exceptions apply. Players may hold more than one non-FIFA nationality.

No. / Pos. / Nation / Player	No. / Pos. / Nation / Player

=== Out on loan ===
Note: Flags indicate national team as defined under FIFA eligibility rules; some limited exceptions apply. Players may hold more than one non-FIFA nationality.

No.	Pos.	Nation	Player

=== Retired numbers ===
- 7 – (Malta) Gilbert Agius, FW, 1990–2012
- 12 – Representing the supporters of Valletta as the 12th player of the team

== Personnel ==
=== Coaching staff ===
Position	Staff
Manager	(Malta) Thane Micallef
Assistant Manager	(Malta) Jesmond Zerafa
Goalkeeping coach	(Malta) Romeo Schembri
Team manager	(Malta) Gerard Ellul
Training assistant	(Malta) Jason Galea Lucas
Physical trainer	(Malta) Karl Sciortino
Physio	(Spain) Oscar Alonso
Kit manager	(Malta) Clint Mizzi

=== Managerial history ===
Dates	Name
1949–1950	(England) Harry Tedder
1958–1959	(Scotland) Bob Gilmour
1959–1960	(England) William Dingwall
1962–1964	(Malta) Carm Borg
1968–1970	(Malta) Tony Formosa
1970–1972	(Malta) Josie Urpani
1973–1975	(Malta) Tony Formosa
1975–1976	(Malta) Josie Urpani
1976–1977	(Italy) Terenzio Polverini
1977–1978	(Malta) Lolly Debattista
1978–1981	(Malta) John Calleja
1982–1984	(Malta) Joe Cilia
1986–1988	(Malta) Tony Formosa (Malta) Joe Micallef
1989–1990	(Malta) George Busuttil
1989–1990	(Malta) Eddie Vella
1991–1993	(Malta) Tony Euchar Grech
1993–1994	(Malta) Lawrence Borg
1994–1995	(Malta) Joe Cilia (Malta) Edward Aquilina
1995–1998	(Malta) Edward Aquilina
1998–2001	(Bulgaria) Krasimir Manolov
2001–2002	(Bulgaria) Georgi Deanov
2003–2004	(Bulgaria) Atanas Marinov
2004–2005	(Malta) Joseph John Aquilina
2004–2009	(Malta) Paul Zammit
2009–2010	(Netherlands) Ton Caanen
2010–2012	(Malta) Jesmond Zerafa
2012–2013	(England) Mark Miller
2014	(Netherlands) André Paus
2014–2015	(Malta) Gilbert Agius (Malta) Ivan Zammit
2015–2017	(Malta) Paul Zammit
2015–2017	(Serbia) Zoran Popović
2017– 2019	(Serbia) Danilo Dončić
2019	(Malta) Gilbert Agius (Caretaker)
2019–2020	(Malta) Darren Abdilla
2020	(Italy) Giovanni Tedesco
2020	(Malta) Jesmond Zerafa
2020	(Malta) Gilbert Agius (Caretaker)
2020–2022	(Portugal) Tozé Mendes
2022	(Serbia) Danilo Dončić
2022–2023	(Malta) Thane Micallef
2023–2024	(Italy) Enzo Potenza
2024	(Argentina) Juan Cruz Gill (Caretaker)
2024–	(Malta) Thane Micallef

== European record ==
As of 10 August 2020

Competition	Played	Won	Drew	Lost	GF	GA	GD	Win%
European Cup / Champions League	45	8	6	31	37	112	−75	17.78
Cup Winners' Cup	14	0	2	12	6	54	−48	0.00
UEFA Cup / UEFA Europa League	36	5	7	24	35	80	−45	13.89
UEFA Intertoto Cup	4	0	2	2	3	9	−6	0.00
Total	99	13	17	69	75	255	−180	13.13

Legend: GF = Goals For. GA = Goals Against. GD = Goal Difference.

Season	Competition	Round	Club	Home	Away	Aggregate
1963–64	European Cup	PR	(Czechoslovakia) Dukla Prague	0–2	0–6	0–8
1964–65	European Cup Winners' Cup	1R	(Spain) Real Zaragoza	0–3	1–5	1–8
1972–73	UEFA Cup	1R	(Italy) Inter Milan	0–1	1–6	1–7
1974–75	European Cup	1R	(Finland) HJK Helsinki	1–0	1–4	2–4
1975–76	European Cup Winners' Cup	1R	(Hungary) Haladás VSE	1–1	0–7	1–8
1977–78	European Cup Winners' Cup	1R	(Soviet Union) Dynamo Moscow	0–2	0–5	0–7
1978–79	European Cup	1R	(Switzerland) Grasshopper	3–5	0–8	3–13
1979–80	UEFA Cup	1R	(England) Leeds United	0–4	0–3	0–7
1980–81	European Cup	PR	(Hungary) Budapest Honvéd	0–3	0–8	0–11
1983–84	European Cup Winners' Cup	1R	(Scotland) Rangers	0–8	0–10	0–18
1984–85	European Cup	1R	Austria Wien	0–4	0–4	0–8
1987–88	UEFA Cup	1R	(Italy) Juventus	0–4	0–3	0–7
1989–90	UEFA Cup	1R	(Austria) First Vienna	1–4	0–3	1–7
1990–91	European Cup	1R	(Scotland) Rangers	0–4	0–6	0–10
1991–92	UEFA Cup Winners' Cup	1R	(Portugal) Porto	0–3	0–1	0–4
1992–93	UEFA Champions League	PR	(Israel) Maccabi Tel Aviv	1–2	0–1	1–3
1993–94	UEFA Cup	1R	(Turkey) Trabzonspor	1–3	1–3	2–6
1994–95	UEFA Cup	PR	(Romania) Rapid București	2–6	1–1	3–7
1995–96	UEFA Cup Winners' Cup	QR	(Slovakia) Inter Bratislava	0–0	2–5	2–5
1996–97	UEFA Cup Winners' Cup	QR	(Romania) Gloria Bistrița	1–2	1–2	2–4
1997–98	UEFA Champions League	1QR	(Latvia) Skonto Riga	1–0	0–2	1–2
1998–99	UEFA Champions League	1QR	(Cyprus) Anorthosis Famagusta	0–2	0–6	0–8
1999–00	UEFA Champions League	1QR	(Wales) Barry Town	3–2	0–0	3–2
1999–00	UEFA Champions League	2QR	(Austria) Rapid Wien	0–2	0–3	0–5
2000–01	UEFA Cup	1QR	(Croatia) Rijeka	4–5	2–3	6–8 (a.e.t.)
2001–02	UEFA Champions League	1QR	(Finland) Haka	0–0	0–5	0–5
2002	UEFA Intertoto Cup	1R	(Albania) Teuta	1–2	0–0	1–2
2003–04	UEFA Cup	1QR	(Switzerland) Neuchâtel Xamax	0–2	0–2	0–4
2005	UEFA Intertoto Cup	1R	(Serbia and Montenegro) Budućnost Podgorica	0–5	2–2	2–7
2008–09	UEFA Champions League	1QR	(Slovakia) Artmedia	0–2	0–1	0–3
2009–10	UEFA Europa League	1QR	(Iceland) Keflavík	3–0	2–2	5–2
2009–10	UEFA Europa League	2QR	(Republic of Ireland) St Patrick's Athletic	0–1	1–1	1–2
2010–11	UEFA Europa League	2QR	(Poland) Ruch Chorzów	1–1	0–0	1–1 (a)
2011–12	UEFA Champions League	1QR	(San Marino) Tre Fiori	2–1	3–0	5–1
2011–12	UEFA Champions League	2QR	(Lithuania) Ekranas	2–3	0–1	2–4
2012–13	UEFA Champions League	1QR	(Andorra) Lusitanos	8–0	1–0	9–0
2012–13	UEFA Champions League	2QR	(Serbia) Partizan	1–4	1–3	2–7
2013–14	UEFA Europa League	1QR	(San Marino) Fiorita	1–0	3–0	4–0
2013–14	UEFA Europa League	2QR	(Belarus) Minsk	1–1	0–2	1–3
2014–15	UEFA Champions League	2QR	(Azerbaijan) Qarabağ	0–1	0–4	0–5
2015–16	UEFA Europa League	1QR	(Wales) Newtown	1–2	1–2	2–4
2016–17	UEFA Champions League	1QR	(Faroe Islands) B36 Tórshavn	1–0	1–2	2–2 (a)
2016–17	UEFA Champions League	2QR	(Serbia) Red Star Belgrade	1–2	1–2	2–4
2017–18	UEFA Europa League	1QR	(San Marino) Folgore	2–0	1–0	3–0
2017–18	UEFA Europa League	2QR	(Netherlands) FC Utrecht	0–0	1–3	1–3
2018–19	UEFA Champions League	1QR	(Albania) Kukësi	1–1	0–0	1–1 (a)
2018–19	UEFA Europa League	2QR	(Bosnia and Herzegovina) Zrinjski Mostar	1–2	1–1	2–3
2019–20	UEFA Champions League	1QR	(Luxembourg) F91 Dudelange	1–1	2–2	3–3 (a)
2019–20	UEFA Champions League	2QR	(Hungary) Ferencváros	1–1	1–3	2–4
2019–20	UEFA Europa League	3QR	(Kazakhstan) Astana	1–5	0–4	1–9
2020–21	UEFA Europa League	1QR	(Wales) Bala Town	0–1	—N/a	—N/a

== Honours ==
Competition	Titles	Seasons
Maltese Premier League	25	1914–15, (Note: Valletta United, the predecessors of Valletta F.C., won the league title in 1914–15 and 1931–32 seasons.) 1931–32, 1944–45, 1945–46, 1947–48, 1958–59, 1959–60, 1962–63, 1973–74, 1977–78, 1979–80, 1983–84, 1989–90, 1991–92, 1996–97, 1997–98, 1998–99, 2000–01, 2007–08, 2010–11, 2011–12, 2013–14, 2015–16, 2017–18, 2018–19
Maltese FA Trophy	15	1959–60, 1963–64, 1974–75, 1976–77, 1977–78, 1990–91, 1994–95, 1995–96, 1996–97, 1998–99, 2000–01, 2009–10, 2013–14, 2017–18, 2025–26
Maltese Super Cup	14	1990, 1995, 1997, 1998, 1999, 2001, 2008, 2010, 2011, 2012, 2016, 2018, 2019, 2026
Cassar Cup	4	1943–44, 1958–59, 1965–66, 1967–68
Super 5 Lottery Tournament	4	1992–93, 1996–97, 1999–2000, 2000–01
Cousis Shield	2	1914–15, 1920–21
Scicluna Cup	2	1960–61, 1963–64
Independence Cup	3	1974–75, 1979–80, 1980–81
Malta Cup	1	1943–44
Testaferrata Cup	1	1979–80
Centenary Cup	1	2000–01
Maltese National League 100 Anniversary Cup	1	2009–10
Jubilee Cup	1	2025–26
Euro Challenge Cup	6	1983–84, 1987–88, 1989–90, 2011–12, 2013–14, 2014–15
Löwenbräu Cup	6	1993–94, 1994–95, 1995–96, 1996–97, 1997–98, 2000–01
Coronation Cup	1	1953–54
Sons of Malta Cup	2	1974–75, 1978–79
Olympic Cup	1	1962–63
Melita Cup	1	1911
Ranger's Cup	1	1914
Poppy Day Fund Cup	1	1960–61
BetFair Cup	1	2008
Mare Blue Cup	2	2010–11, 2011–12
Doubles: League & Trophy in the same season	8	1914–15, 1959–60, 1977–78, 1996–97, 1998–99, 2000–01, 2013–14, 2017–18
All Cups in the same season	3	1996–97 (5/5 Cups), 2000–01 (6/6 Cups), 2017–2018 (3/3 Cups)
