= Petar Alyoshev =

Bulgarian footballer (born 1987)

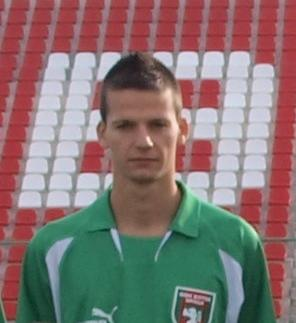

Personal information
- Full name: Petar Alyoshev Petrov
- Date of birth: 11 May 1987 (age 39)
- Place of birth: Vratsa, Bulgaria
- Height: 1.87 m (6 ft 1 1/2 in)
- Position: Defender

Senior career*
Years	Team	Apps	(Gls)
2007–2008	Lokomotiv Mezdra	1	(0)
2009–2012	Botev Vratsa	55	(4)
2012	Slavia Sofia	5	(0)
2013	Botev Vratsa	22	(4)
2014	Lyubimets 2007	6	(0)
2014	Chernomorets Burgas	13	(0)
2015	Botev Vratsa	12	(1)
2015–2016	Oborishte	23	(0)
2016–2017	Ludogorets Razgrad II	19	(0)
2017	Ludogorets Razgrad	0	(0)
2017–2018	Botev Vratsa	14	(1)
- * Club domestic league appearances and goals as of 26 May 2018

Petar Alyoshev Petrov (Bulgarian: Петър Альошев Петров; born 11 May 1987) is a Bulgarian football defender.

== Career ==
Alyoshev had previously played for Lokomotiv Mezdra, Botev Vratsa, Slavia Sofia, Lyubimets 2007 and Chernomorets Burgas. In July 2017, he returned to Botev Vratsa but left the club at the end of the season.
