= Youness Bengelloun =

French footballer (born 1983)

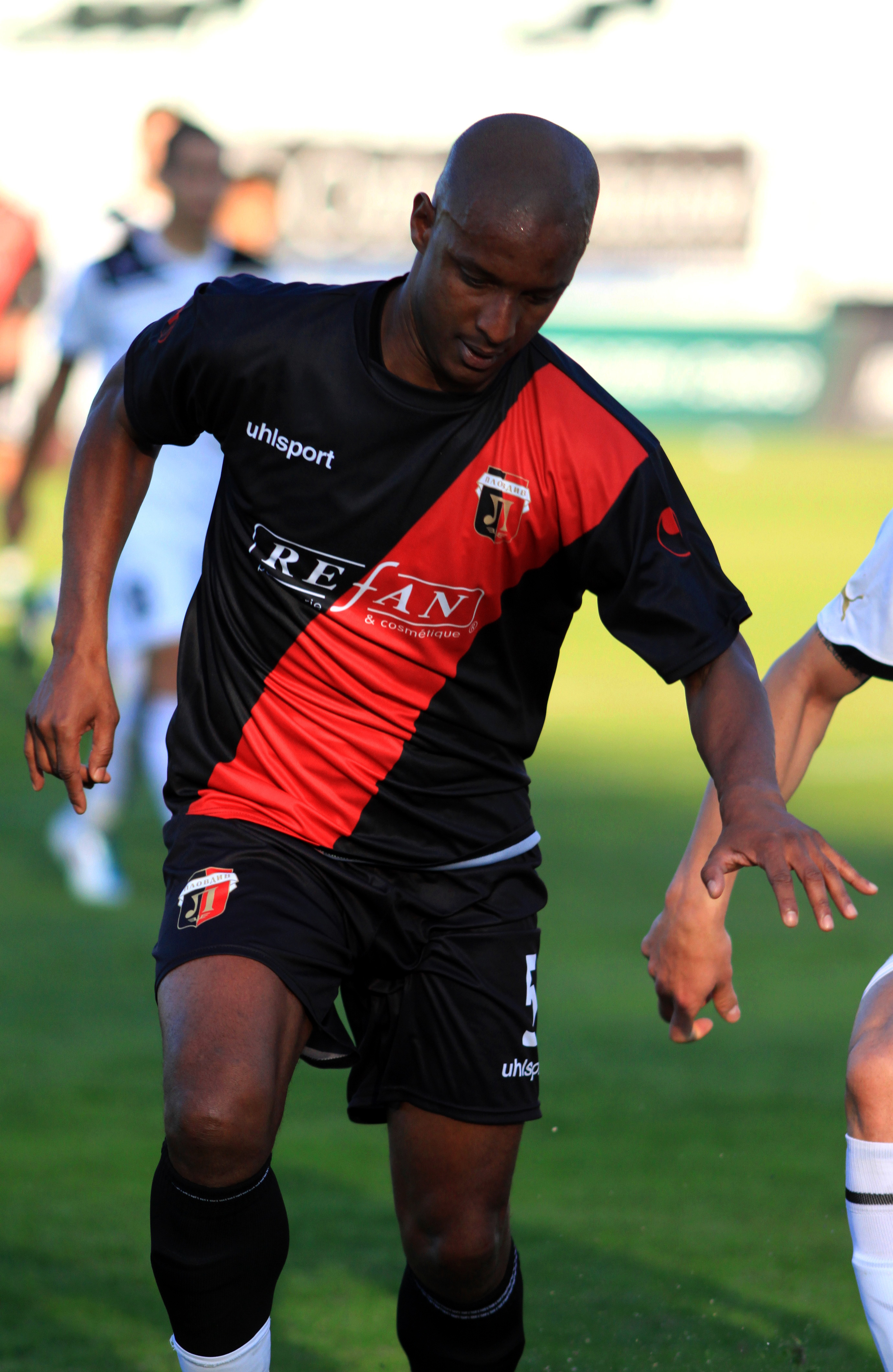
- Bengelloun playing for Lokomotiv Plovdiv

Personal information
- Date of birth: 3 January 1983 (age 43)
- Place of birth: Paris, France
- Position: Defender

Team information
- Current team: Manchester City (scout)

Senior career*
Years	Team	Apps	(Gls)
2001–2004	Paris Saint-Germain B	43	(6)
2002–2003	→ Amiens (loan)	28	(0)
2004	Neuchâtel Xamax	12	(0)
2004–2005	Alavés	0	(0)
2005–2006	Raon-l'Étape	5	(1)
2006–2007	Istres	2	(0)
2007–2008	Panserraikos	25	(3)
2008–2009	Olympiakos Nicosia	23	(2)
2009–2012	Lokomotiv Plovdiv	66	(8)
2012–2013	CSKA Sofia	0	(0)
2013–2014	Mulhouse	23	(1)
2014–2015	FC Goa	13	(2)
2015	WS Bruxelles	6	(1)
Total		246	(24)
- * Club domestic league appearances and goals as of 05:50, 26 July 2015 (UTC)

Youness Bengelloun (born 3 January 1983) is a French former footballer who played as a defender. He is a scout at Manchester City.

== Career ==
Born in Paris, Bengelloun has played in France, Switzerland, Spain, Greece, Cyprus and Bulgaria for Paris Saint-Germain B, Amiens, Neuchâtel Xamax, Alavés, Raon-l'Étape, Istres, Panserraikos, Olympiakos Nicosia, Lokomotiv Plovdiv, CSKA Sofia and Mulhouse. (Note: Youness Bengelloun – French league stats at LFP – also available in French (archived))

In June 2009 he trialled with Scottish club Hibernian.

On 21 August 2014, Bengelloun was drafted by Goa to play in the Indian Super League.

After retiring from football, Bengelloun was appointed as a scout by English side Manchester City in July 2017.
