= Nilson Antonio =

Cape Verdean footballer (born 1987)

Nilson António
Personal information
- Full name: Nilson António da Veiga de Barros
- Date of birth: 5 August 1987 (age 39)
- Place of birth: Santa Cruz, Cape Verde
- Height: 1.80 m (5 ft 11 in)
- Position: Left-back

Youth career
- 2005–2006: Portimonense

Senior career*
Years	Team	Apps	(Gls)
2006–2008	G.D. Lagoa	25	(0)
2008–2011	Portimonense	47	(1)
2011–2012	AEL Limassol	16	(0)
2012–2013	CSKA Sofia	5	(0)
2014–2015	Doxa Katokopias	41	(1)
2015–2017	União Madeira	2	(0)
2017–2018	FC Castrense	24	(1)

International career
2009–2011	Cape Verde	2	(0)
- * Club domestic league appearances and goals as of 07:07, 1 April 2015 (UTC)

Nilson António da Veiga de Barros (born 5 August 1987), better known as Nilson, is a Cape Verdean professional footballer who plays as a left-back. He played for Portimonense between 2008 and 2011. Nilson signed with CSKA Sofia in the summer of 2012, but sustained an injury in October 2012, which kept him out of action for a number of months. After his recovery, he decided to continue his career with Portimonense, agreeing to terms in February 2013.

== Career statistics ==
As of match played on 22 March 2015.

Club	Season	League			Cup		Other		Total	
Club	Season	Division	Apps	Goals	Apps	Goals	Apps	Goals	Apps	Goals
Portimonense	2008–09	Segunda Liga	12	0	2	0	—		14	0
Portimonense	2009–10	Segunda Liga	23	0	4	0	—		27	0
Portimonense	2010–11	Primeira Liga	12	1	3	0	—		15	1
Portimonense	Total		47	1	9	0	—		56	1
AEL Limassol	2011–12	Cypriot First Division	16	0	1	0	—		17	0
CSKA Sofia	2012–13	A PFG	5	0	0	0	2 (Note: Appearances in UEFA Europa League)	0	7	0
Doxa	2013–14	Cypriot First Division	16	1	3	0	—		19	1
Doxa	2014–15	Cypriot First Division	25	0	1	0	—		26	0
Doxa	Total		41	1	4	0	—		45	1
Career total			109	2	14	0	2	0	125	2
