= Amadeusz Skrzyniarz =

Polish footballer

Personal information
- Full name: Amadeusz Gabriel Skrzyniarz
- Date of birth: 7 July 1994 (age 32)
- Place of birth: Dzierżoniów, Poland
- Height: 1.84 m (6 ft 1/2 in)
- Position: Goalkeeper

Team information
- Current team: Millbrook

Youth career
- Orzeł Ząbkowice Śląskie
- 2008–2012: Zagłębie Lubin

Senior career*
| Years | Team | Apps | (Gls) |
| 2012–2013 | Zagłębie Lubin | 0 | (0) |
| 2013 | → MKS Kluczbork (loan) | 17 | (0) |
| 2014 | Chrobry Głogów | 19 | (0) |
| 2015 | Limanovia Limanowa | 7 | (0) |
| 2015–2016 | Romsey Town | 26 | (0) |
| 2019–2022 | AFC Totton | 7 | (0) |
| 2021–2022 | → Blackfield & Langley (loan) | 24 | (0) |
| 2022 | → Lymington Town (loan) | | |
| 2022 | Lymington Town | | |
| 2022 | AFC Portchester | 4 | (0) |
| 2023 | Bemerton Heath Harlequins | 1 | (0) |
| 2023–2024 | Brockenhurst | 22 | (0) |
| 2024– | Millbrook | 5 | (0) |

International career
| 2012 | Poland U19 | 4 | (0) |
- * Club domestic league appearances and goals as of 11:50, 3 October 2024 (UTC)

Amadeusz Gabriel Skrzyniarz (born 7 July 1994) is a Polish footballer who plays as a goalkeeper for Millbrook.

== Career ==
Skrzyniarz began his career in his native Poland, appearing five times in the I liga for Chrobry Głogów.

In October 2015, Skryzniarz signed for Romsey Town in England. In October 2019, Skrzyniarz signed for AFC Totton. In June 2021, he joined Wessex League side Blackfield & Langley on a season-long loan deal. In the summer of 2022, Skrzyniarz joined Southern League Division One South side Lymington Town on a permanent deal, having spent time on loan at the club during the previous season. A few months later, he joined AFC Portchester. On 30 June 2023, Skrzyniarz joined newly-promoted Southern League side Bemerton Heath Harlequins. Later in the season he joined Brockenhurst before signing for Millbrook in the summer of 2024.

== Honours ==
Chrobry Głogów

- II liga West: 2013–14
