= 2001–02 PFC Cherno More Varna season =

Cherno More
2001–02 season
- Chairman: Krasen Kralev
- Manager: Aleksandar Stankov
- A Group: 11th
- Bulgarian Cup: Fourth round (knocked out by CSKA Sofia)
- Top goalscorer: Kristiyan Dobrev (10)
- Biggest win: 4–0 (vs Litex, 26 August 2001)
- Biggest defeat: 3–0 (vs Neftochimic, 15 Sep 2001)
Home colours	Away colours

This page covers all relevant details regarding PFC Cherno More Varna for all official competitions inside the 2000–01 season. These are A Group and Bulgarian Cup.

== Transfers ==
=== Summer transfer window ===
In:

No.	Pos.	Nation	Player
—	GK	BUL	Mihail Rolev (from Velbazhd)
—	GK	BUL	Ivaylo Petrov (from Beroe)
—	DF	BUL	Aleksey Dionisiev (on loan from Levski Sofia)
—	DF	BUL	Grigor Stoychovski (from Balkan)
—	MF	BUL	Ivan Mekikov (on loan from CSKA Sofia)
—	MF	BUL	Petar Zlatinov (on loan from CSKA Sofia)
—	MF	RUS	Vladimir Gerasimov (from (Russia) Krylia Sovetov)
—	MF	BUL	Rumen Kalchev (on loan from CSKA Sofia)
—	MF	BUL	Plamen Petrov (from Velbazhd)
—	MF	BUL	Daniel Atanasov (from CSKA Sofia)
—	FW	BUL	Stanimir Georgiev (on loan from CSKA Sofia)
—	FW	BUL	Spas Gigov (on loan from CSKA Sofia)

Out:

No.	Pos.	Nation	Player
—	GK	BUL	Tihomir Todorov (to Spartak Pleven)
—	GK	BUL	Galin Milkov (to (France) Dijon FCO)
—	DF	BUL	Zdravko Zdravkov (released)
—	DF	BUL	Zdravko Stankov (released)
—	DF	BUL	Boyko Kamenov (released)
—	DF	BUL	Borislav Pavlov (to Velbazhd)
—	MF	BUL	Bozhidar Kolev (released)
—	MF	BUL	Daniel Kalchev (released)
—	FW	ROU	Costel Ilie (released)
—	FW	BUL	Mario Metushev (to Chernomorets Burgas)
—	FW	BUL	Filip Teofoolu (to Botev Plovdiv)

=== Winter transfer window ===
In:

No.	Pos.	Nation	Player
—	GK	BUL	Todor Kyuchukov (from CSKA Sofia)
—	DF	BUL	Svetoslav Georgiev (from CSKA Sofia)
—	DF	NGA	Emmanuel Baba (from (Nigeria) Jigawa Golden Stars)
—	DF	BUL	Steliyan Popchev (from Beroe)
—	MF	BUL	Slavi Zhekov (from Beroe)
—	MF	NGA	Richard Eromoigbe (on from Levski Sofia)
—	MF	NGA	Omonigho Temile (from (Nigeria) Delta United)
—	FW	BUL	Evgeni Kurdov (from Botev Plovdiv)
—	FW	BUL	Miroslav Mindev (from Olimpik Teteven)
—	FW	BUL	Stanislav Rumenov (from CSKA Sofia)

Out:

No.	Pos.	Nation	Player
—	GK	BUL	Mihail Rolev (released)
—	DF	BUL	Kaloyan Filatov (to Dobrudzha)
—	MF	BUL	Ivan Mekikov (loan return to CSKA Sofia)
—	MF	BUL	Milen Petkov (to Botev Vratsa)
—	MF	BUL	Rumen Kalchev (loan return to CSKA Sofia)
—	MF	BUL	Petar Zlatinov (loan return to CSKA Sofia)
—	FW	BUL	Stanimir Georgiev (loan return to CSKA Sofia)

== Squad ==
=== League Statistics ===
Pos.	Nat.	Name	App	Goals
GK	(Bulgaria)	Ivaylo Petrov	25	0
GK	(Bulgaria)	Todor Kyuchukov	?	0
GK	(Bulgaria)	Nedelcho Dobrev	?	0
DF	(Bulgaria)	Grigor Stoychovski	?	0
DF	(Bulgaria)	Filip Ilkov	?	0
DF	(Bulgaria)	Aleksey Dionisiev	30	1
DF	(Federal Republic of Yugoslavia)	Miroslav Milošević	?	0
DF	(Bulgaria)	Svetoslav Georgiev	11	0
DF	(Nigeria)	Emmanuel Baba	?	0
DF	(Bulgaria)	Ventsislav Marinov	?	0
DF	(Federal Republic of Yugoslavia)	Mark Šekularac	?	0
DF	(Bulgaria)	Steliyan Popchev	?	2
MF	(Bulgaria)	Daniel Atanasov	?	2
MF	(Bulgaria)	Georgi Iliev	36	8
MF	(Russia)	Vladimir Gerasimov	31	1
MF	(Bulgaria)	Ivo Mihaylov	?	1
MF	(Bulgaria)	Yavor Georgiev	?	0
MF	(Bulgaria)	Lyudmil Kirov	?	1
MF	(Nigeria)	Richard Eromoigbe	5	0
MF	(Bulgaria)	Kristiyan Dobrev	33	10
MF	(Bulgaria)	Slavi Zhekov	?	2
MF	(Nigeria)	Omonigho Temile	19	2
MF	(Bulgaria)	Stanislav Stoyanov	21	2
MF	(Bulgaria)	Plamen Petrov	?	0
FW	(Bulgaria)	Stanislav Rumenov	?	4
FW	(Bulgaria)	Evgeni Kurdov	?	2
FW	(Bulgaria)	Miroslav Mindev	15	1
FW	(Bulgaria)	Spas Gigov	?	3

Players, who left the club during a season

Pos.	Nat.	Name	App	Goals
GK	(Bulgaria)	Mihail Rolev	8	0
DF	(Bulgaria)	Kaloyan Filatov	?	0
MF	(Bulgaria)	Ivan Mekikov	2	0
MF	(Bulgaria)	Milen Petkov	?	0
MF	(Bulgaria)	Rumen Kalchev	?	?
MF	(Bulgaria)	Petar Zlatinov	11	0
MF	(Bulgaria)	Stanimir Georgiev	?	3

== Matches ==
=== A Group ===
==== Regular season ====
4 August 2001 Round 1	Cherno More	0 – 1	Slavia Sofia	Varna
18:00 EEST			Kushev 19' (pen.)	Stadium: Ticha

11 August 2001 Round 2	Levski Sofia	1 – 0	Cherno More	Sofia
19:00 EEST	Pantelić 26'	report	Mihaylov (yellow card); Ilkov (yellow card); Milošević (yellow card); Filatov (yellow card); N. Dobrev (yellow card)	Stadium: Georgi Asparuhov; Attendance: 5,000; Referee: Svetoslav Stefanov (Veliko Tarnovo)

18 August 2001 Round 3	Cherno More	2 – 0	Beroe Stara Zagora	Varna
18:00 EEST	Dragov 22' (o.g.); Dobrev 89'	report		Stadium: Ticha; Attendance: 3,000; Referee: Asen Nikolov

26 August 2001 Round 4	Cherno More	4 – 0	Litex Lovech	Varna
18:00 EEST	Zhelev 58' (o.g.); Dobrev 72' (pen.); Kirov 83'; Gigov 87'			Stadium: Ticha

8 September 2001 Round 5	Lokomotiv Plovdiv	2 – 1	Cherno More	Plovdiv
17:00 EEST	Pavlov 63'; Stoynev 72'		Stoyanov 41'	Stadium: Lokomotiv

15 September 2001 Round 6	Cherno More	0 – 3	Neftochimic Burgas	Varna
17:30 EEST			Timnev 35'; Sakaliev 78', 84' (pen.)	Stadium: Ticha

22 September 2001 Round 7	Lokomotiv Sofia	1 – 2	Cherno More	Sofia
17:00 EEST	Karl 49' (pen.); Genchev (yellow card); Donev (yellow card); Hristov (yellow card)	report	St. Georgiev 10'; G. Iliev 44'; Kalchev (yellow card); Dobrev (yellow card)	Stadium: Lokomotiv; Attendance: 2,000; Referee: Dimitar Dimitrov (Sofia)

29 September 2001 Round 8	Cherno More	2 – 1	Belasitsa Petrich	Varna
17:00 EEST	G. Iliev 43', 90' (pen.); G. Iliev (yellow card); Gerasimov (yellow card); St. Georgiev (yellow card)	report	Arnaudov 65'; A. Dimitrov (yellow card); Dinei (yellow card)	Stadium: Ticha; Attendance: 1,500; Referee: Tsvetan Georgiev (Sofia)

9 October 2001 Round 9	CSKA Sofia	1 – 0	Cherno More	Sofia
17:30 EEST	Sv. Petrov 88' (pen.)	report	Šekularac (yellow card); Gerasimov (yellow card); Kirov (yellow card); Rolev (yellow card)	Stadium: Balgarska Armia; Attendance: 3,000; Referee: Yordan Stalev (Plovdiv)

14 October 2001 Round 10	Cherno More	1 – 1	Spartak Varna	Varna
14:00 EEST	Dionisiev 48'; Dionisiev (yellow card); Kalchev (yellow card); Atanasov (yellow card) (yellow-red card)	report	V. Stanchev 45'; Stoykov (yellow card); Karakanov (yellow card); Varbanov (yellow card); Simeonov (yellow card); An. Petrov (yellow card); N. Stanchev (yellow card) (yellow-red card)	Stadium: Ticha; Attendance: 8,000; Referee: Momchil Vraykov (Pleven)

20 October 2001 Round 11	Marek Dupnitsa	2 – 0	Cherno More	Dupnitsa
16:00 EEST	Paparkov 7' (pen.); V. Dimitrov 55'; Paparkov (yellow card); Belchev (yellow card); Stoynov (yellow card)	report	Zlatinov (yellow card); Filatov (yellow card); G. Iliev (yellow card); Pl. Petrov (yellow card); Dobrev (yellow card); Dionisiev (yellow card)	Stadium: Bonchuk; Attendance: 5,000; Referee: Anton Getsov (Veliko Tarnovo)

27 October 2001 Round 12	Cherno More	2 – 2	Spartak Pleven	Varna
16:00 EEST	Dobrev 8'; St. Georgiev 32'; G. Iliev (yellow card); Stoychovski (yellow card)	report	E. Todorov 59'; T. Kolev 69'; Goshev (yellow card); Bogdanov (yellow card); G. Ivanov (yellow card)	Stadium: Ticha; Attendance: 2,500; Referee: Dimitar Dimitrov (Sofia)

3 November 2001 Round 13	Chernomorets Burgas	1 – 0	Cherno More	Burgas
14:30 EEST	Banev 65'			Stadium: Chernomorets

10 November 2001 Round 14	Slavia Sofia	0 – 0	Cherno More	Sofia
14:30 EEST	Y. Petkov (yellow card); Đukić (yellow card); Marinković (yellow card); Dzhorov (red card) 62'; Vachev (red card) 70'	report	Dobrev (yellow card); Gerasimov (yellow card); Gigov (yellow card); Dionisiev (red card) 40'	Stadium: Slavia; Attendance: 500; Referee: Anton Genov (Gabrovo)

16 November 2001 Round 15	Cherno More	1 – 2	Levski Sofia	Lovech
14:30 EEST	G. Iliev 20'; Dobrev (yellow card); Pl. Petrov (yellow card)	report	Chilikov 6'; B. Ivanov 78'; Angelov (yellow card)	Stadium: Lovech; Attendance: 1,500; Referee: Svetozar Marinov (Ruse)

23 November 2001 Round 16	Beroe Stara Zagora	3 – 1	Cherno More	Stara Zagora
14:30 EEST	Bibishkov 39', 83'; Shishkov 55'; Popchev (yellow card); Penev (yellow card); Zhelev (yellow card); Zhekov (yellow card)	report	G. Iliev 65'	Stadium: Beroe; Attendance: 3,000; Referee: Kamen Aleksiev (Veliko Tarnovo)

1 December 2001 Round 17	Litex Lovech	3 – 2	Cherno More	Lovech
14:00 EEST	Janković 14', 60'; Yurukov 19'; Henrique (yellow card)	report	Gigov 83'; St. Georgiev 87'; Dobrev (yellow card); Gerasimov (yellow card)	Stadium: Lovech; Attendance: 1,000; Referee: Tsvetan Georgiev (Sofia)

13 March 2002 Round 18	Cherno More	1 – 3	Lokomotiv Plovdiv	Varna
14:30 EEST	Temile 23'		Paskov 8'; Stoynev 83'; Trajanov 90'	Stadium: Ticha

16 February 2002 Round 19	Neftochimic Burgas	1 – 0	Cherno More	Burgas
17:30 EEST	Viciknez 4'			Stadium: Lazur

23 February 2002 Round 20	Cherno More	1 – 1	Lokomotiv Sofia	Varna
14:30 EEST	Popchev 5'; Sv. Georgiev (yellow card); Zhekov (yellow card); Pl. Petrov (yellow card); Mihaylov (yellow card)	report	Donev 84'	Stadium: Ticha; Attendance: 3,000; Referee: Ivan Dobrinov (Sofia)

2 March 2002 Round 21	Belasitsa Petrich	1 – 1	Cherno More	Petrich
14:00 EEST	Y. Minev 45'; Arnaudov (yellow card); Salis (yellow card); Aldev (yellow card)	report	Rumenov 42'; Popchev (yellow card); Gerasimov (yellow card); Mihaylov (yellow card); Temile (yellow card)	Stadium: Tsar Samuil; Attendance: 3,000; Referee: Momchil Vraykov (Pleven)

6 March 2002 Round 22	Cherno More	0 – 1	CSKA Sofia	Varna
15:30 EEST	Popchev (yellow card); Atanasov (yellow card)	report	Manchev 76'; Gueye (yellow card); G. Ivanov (yellow card); Manchev (yellow card)	Stadium: Ticha; Attendance: 6,000; Referee: Stefan Gospodinov (Stara Zagora)

10 March 2002 Round 23	Spartak Varna	0 – 0	Cherno More	Varna
15:30 EEST	St. Donchev (yellow card); Karakanov (yellow card); Krastev (yellow card) (yellow-red card)	report	Dionisiev (yellow card); Popchev (yellow card); G. Iliev (yellow card)	Stadium: Spartak; Attendance: 4,000; Referee: Ivan Dobrinov (Sofia)

16 March 2002 Round 24	Cherno More	3 – 1	Marek Dupnitsa	Varna
15:30 EEST	Dobrev 11'; Zhekov 38'; Atanasov 75'; Temile (yellow card)	report	Kirilov 8'; Arangelov (yellow card); Velikov (yellow card); Yonkov (yellow card)	Stadium: Ticha; Attendance: 2,000; Referee: Dimitar Kostov (Burgas)

23 March 2002 Round 25	Spartak Pleven	3 – 1	Cherno More	Pleven
15:30 EEST	G. Georgiev 10'; T. Kolev 43', 48'; Peykov (yellow card)	report	Mindev 79'; I. Petrov (yellow card); Baba (yellow card); Temile (yellow card); Atanasov (yellow card)	Stadium: Belite Orli; Attendance: 200; Referee: Anton Getsov (Veliko Tarnovo)

1 April 2002 Round 26	Cherno More	3 – 1	Chernomorets Burgas	Varna
15:30 EEST	G. Iliev 39'; Rumenov 60', 66'		Dzhambazov 63' (pen.)	Stadium: Ticha

===== Table =====
Pos	Team	Pld	W	D	L	GF	GA	GD	Pts	Qualification
10	Chernomorets Burgas	26	7	5	14	24	54	−30	26	Qualification for relegation group
11	Marek	26	6	6	14	22	42	−20	24	Qualification for relegation group
12	Cherno More	26	6	6	14	28	36	−8	24	Qualification for relegation group
13	Belasitsa Petrich	26	6	5	15	21	35	−14	23	Qualification for relegation group
14	Beroe	26	3	5	18	13	46	−33	14	Qualification for relegation group

Source: A PFG (in Bulgarian)
Rules for classification: 1st points; 2nd head-to-head points; 3rd head-to-head goal difference; 4th head-to-head goals scored; 5th head-to-head away goals scored; 6th season goal difference; 7th season goals scored; 8th "sportsmanship" (R & Y cards); 9th draw.

==== Results summary ====
Overall								Home						Away					
Pld	W	D	L	GF	GA	GD	Pts	W	D	L	GF	GA	GD	W	D	L	GF	GA	GD
26	6	6	14	28	36	−8	24	5	3	5	20	17	+3	1	3	9	8	19	−11

==== League performance ====
Round	1	2	3	4	5	6	7	8	9	10	11	12	13	14	15	16	17	18	19	20	21	22	23	24	25	26
Ground	H	A	H	H	A	H	A	H	A	H	A	H	A	A	H	A	A	H	A	H	A	H	A	H	A	H
Result	L	L	W	W	L	L	W	W	L	D	L	D	L	D	L	L	L	L	L	D	D	L	D	W	L	W
Position	14	14	11	7	8	10	9	7	7	7	8	8	9	9	10	10	11	12	13	13	13	13	13	12	13	12

A = Away; H = Home; W = Win; D = Draw; L = Loss

==== Relegation round ====
6 April 2002 Round 27	Spartak Varna	1 – 2	Cherno More	Varna
17:00 EEST	Krumov 50'; Lazarov (yellow card); N. Stanchev (yellow card); I. Iliev (yellow card); Karakanov (yellow card); Donchev (yellow card); Krumov (yellow card)	report	Gerasimov 30'; Mihaylov 56' (pen.); Sv. Georgiev (yellow card); Pl. Petrov (yellow card); Y. Georgiev (yellow card)	Stadium: Spartak; Attendance: 1,500; Referee: Kostadin Kostadinov (Sofia)

13 April 2002 Round 28	Cherno More	1 – 1	Chernomorets Burgas	Varna
17:00 EEST	Dobrev 83' (pen.); Mihaylov (yellow card); Atanasov (yellow card)	report	Y. Todorov 48' (pen.); Ivanikov (yellow card)	Stadium: Ticha; Attendance: 1,000; Referee: Hristo Ristoskov (Sandanski)

17 April 2002 Round 29	Marek Dupnitsa	1 – 1	Cherno More	Dupnitsa
17:00 EEST	Arangelov 63'		Dobrev 14' (pen.)	Stadium: Bonchuk; Attendance: 2,000

20 April 2002 Round 30	Beroe Stara Zagora	1 – 1	Cherno More	Stara Zagora
17:00 EEST	Gospodinov 43'; Gospodinov (yellow card); Bibishkov (yellow card); Yonov (yellow card)	report	Dobrev 62'; Popchev (yellow card); Temile (yellow card) (yellow-red card) 45'	Stadium: Beroe; Attendance: 4,000; Referee: Yordan Stalev (Plovdiv)

24 April 2002 Round 31	Cherno More	1 – 1	Belasitsa Petrich	Varna
17:00 EEST	Rumenov 65'		Tunchev 73'	Stadium: Ticha; Attendance: 200; Referee: Yordan Ivanov (Sofia)

28 April 2002 Round 32	Spartak Pleven	2 – 1	Cherno More	Plaven
17:00 EEST	Sirakov 25'; E. Todorov 60' (pen.)		Gigov 70'	Stadium: Pleven; Attendance: 1,200

4 May 2002 Round 33	Cherno More	3 – 2	Lokomotiv Sofia	Varna
18:00 EEST	Dobrev 20'; Zhekov 47'; Kurdov 63'		R. Hristov 74'; Velichkov 77'	Stadium: Ticha; Attendance: 1,000

8 May 2002 Round 34	Cherno More	1 – 1	Spartak Varna	Varna
17:00 EEST	Dobrev 89' (pen.)		Kremenliev 28' (pen.)	Stadium: Ticha; Attendance: 6,000; Referee: Ivan Dobrinov (Sofia)

12 May 2002 Round 35	Chernomorets Burgas	2 – 0	Cherno More	Burgas
18:00 EEST	Metushev 12'; Martinov 82'			Stadium: Chernomorets; Attendance: 4,000

16 May 2002 Round 36	Cherno More	2 – 0	Marek Dupnitsa	Sevlievo
18:00 EEST	Popchev 40'; Atanasov 47'			Stadium: Rakovski; Attendance: 300

19 May 2002 Round 37	Cherno More	2 – 1	Beroe Stara Zagora	Nesebar
17:00 EEST	G. Iliev 51', 53'		Penev 45'	Stadium: Nesebar; Attendance: 1,000

22 May 2002 Round 38	Belasitsa Petrich	1 – 0	Cherno More	Petrich
18:00 EEST	Vava 29'		Atanasov (red card) 30'	Stadium: Tsar Samuil; Attendance: 700

25 May 2002 Round 39	Cherno More	2 – 0	Spartak Pleven	Targovishte
18:00 EEST	Kurdov 45'; Temile 79'			Stadium: Dimitar Burkov; Attendance: 2,500

29 May 2002 Round 40	Lokomotiv Sofia	1 – 2	Cherno More	Sofia
18:00 EEST	R. Ivanov 19'; Manolkov (red card) 22'		Dobrev 48'; Stoyanov 63'	Stadium: Lokomotiv; Attendance: 200

===== Table =====
Pos	Team	Pld	W	D	L	GF	GA	GD	Pts	Qualification or relegation
9	Spartak Varna	40	12	13	15	50	51	−1	36	
10	Chernomorets Burgas	40	13	9	18	41	69	−28	35	
11	Cherno More	40	12	11	17	47	51	−4	35	
12	Spartak Pleven (R)	40	15	4	21	58	66	−8	33	Relegation to 2002–03 B Group
13	Belasitsa Petrich (R)	40	12	7	21	34	50	−16	32	Relegation to 2002–03 B Group

Source: A PFG (in Bulgarian)
Rules for classification: 1st points; 2nd head-to-head points; 3rd head-to-head goal difference; 4th head-to-head goals scored; 5th head-to-head away goals scored; 6th season goal difference; 7th season goals scored; 8th "sportsmanship" (R & Y cards); 9th draw.
(R) Relegated

==== Results summary ====
Overall								Home						Away					
Pld	W	D	L	GF	GA	GD	Pts	W	D	L	GF	GA	GD	W	D	L	GF	GA	GD
14	6	5	3	19	15	+4	23	4	3	0	12	6	+6	2	2	3	7	9	−2

==== League performance ====
Round	1	2	3	4	5	6	7	8	9	10	11	12	13	14
Ground	A	H	A	A	H	A	H	H	A	H	H	A	H	A
Result	W	D	D	D	D	L	W	D	L	W	W	L	W	W
Position	11	10	10	10	11	12	12	12	13	12	10	13	12	11

A = Away; H = Home; W = Win; D = Draw; L = Loss

==== Goalscorers in A Group ====
Rank	Scorer	Goals
1	(Bulgaria) Kristiyan Dobrev	10
2	(Bulgaria) Georgi Iliev	8
3	(Bulgaria) Stanislav Rumenov	4
4	(Bulgaria) Spas Gigov	3
4	(Bulgaria) Stanimir Georgiev	3
6	(Bulgaria) Stanislav Stoyanov	2
6	(Nigeria) Omonigho Temile	2
6	(Bulgaria) Steliyan Popchev	2
6	(Bulgaria) Slavi Zhekov	2
6	(Bulgaria) Daniel Atanasov	2
6	(Bulgaria) Evgeni Kurdov	2
12	(Bulgaria) Lyudmil Kirov	1
12	(Bulgaria) Aleksey Dionisiev	1
12	(Bulgaria) Miroslav Mindev	1
12	(Russia) Vladimir Gerasimov	1
12	(Bulgaria) Ivo Mihaylov	1

=== Bulgarian Cup ===
23 October 2001 3rd Round	Cherno More	5 – 0	Botev Vratsa	Varna
	M. Petkov 3'; Dionisiev 23'; Zlatinov 37', 41'; Gigov 70'			Stadium: Ticha

28 November 2001 4th Round	CSKA Sofia	3 – 2	Cherno More	Sofia
	Manchev 54'; Yanev 56'; Penev 89'	report	Dobrev 43'; Gigov 90'	Stadium: Balgarska Armia
