= 2002–03 PFC Cherno More Varna season =

Bulgarian football team in A Group

Cherno More
2002–03 season
- Chairman: Krasen Kralev
- Manager: Velislav Vutsov
- A Group: 5th
- Bulgarian Cup: Second round (knocked out by Litex Lovech)
- Top goalscorer: Darko Spalević (7)
- Biggest win: 4–0 (vs Rilski Sportist, 2 Nov 2002); 4–0 (vs Botev Plovdiv, 28 Feb 2003); 4–0 (vs Slavia Sofia, 31 May 2003)
- Biggest defeat: 4–1 (vs Lokomotiv Plovdiv, 5 Oct 2002)
Home colours	Away colours

This page covers all relevant details regarding PFC Cherno More Varna for all official competitions inside the 2002–03 season. These are A Group and Bulgarian Cup.

== Transfers ==
=== Summer transfer window ===
In:

No.	Pos.	Nation	Player
—	GK	BUL	Zdravko Zdravkov (from (Turkey) İstanbulspor)
—	GK	BUL	Tihomir Todorov (from Spartak Pleven)
—	DF	BUL	Adalbert Zafirov (from Lokomotiv Sofia)
—	DF	BRA	Lúcio Wagner (on loan from Levski Sofia)
—	DF	BUL	Gosho Ginchev (from (Turkey) Antalyaspor)
—	DF	BUL	Yanek Kyuchukov (from (Greece) Panserraikos)
—	DF	BUL	Stefan Goshev (from Spartak Pleven)
—	MF	BUL	Konstantin Mirchev (from CSKA Sofia)
—	MF	BUL	Marin Petrov (from Litex)
—	MF	BUL	Ivaylo Petev (from Litex)
—	MF	BUL	Asen Bukarev (from CSKA Sofia)
—	FW	BUL	Emil Todorov (from Spartak Pleven)
—	FW	BUL	Stefan Yurukov (from Litex)
—	FW	BRA	Ângelo da Silva (from (Russia) Krylia Sovetov)

Out:

No.	Pos.	Nation	Player
—	GK	BUL	Nedelcho Dobrev (to Dobrudzha)
—	GK	BUL	Todor Kyuchukov (to (Czech Republic) Sigma Olomouc)
—	DF	BUL	Svetoslav Georgiev (to Makedonska Slava)
—	DF	BUL	Steliyan Popchev (to Beroe)
—	DF	YUG	Mark Šekularac (released)
—	DF	BUL	Ventsislav Marinov (retired)
—	DF	BUL	Grigor Stoychovski (released)
—	MF	BUL	Plamen Petrov (to Marek)
—	MF	BUL	Daniel Atanasov (released)
—	MF	BUL	Yavor Georgiev (released)
—	MF	BUL	Lyudmil Kirov (to Dobrudzha)
—	FW	BUL	Spas Gigov (loan return to CSKA Sofia)
—	FW	BUL	Miroslav Mindev (to Sliven 2000)
—	FW	BUL	Evgeni Kurdov (to Rodopa Smolyan)

=== Winter transfer window ===
In:

No.	Pos.	Nation	Player
—	DF	BIH	Dalibor Dragić (from Levski Sofia)
—	DF	BUL	Diyan Donchev (on loan from Spartak Varna)
—	FW	BUL	Kostadin Bashov (on loan from Levski Sofia)
—	FW	MLT	Daniel Bogdanović (from (Malta) Valletta)
—	FW	SCG	Darko Spalević (from (Serbia and Montenegro) Red Star Belgrade)

Out:

No.	Pos.	Nation	Player
—	GK	BUL	Zdravko Zdravkov (to (Turkey) İstanbulspor)
—	DF	BUL	Yanek Kyuchukov (to Marek)
—	DF	BUL	Filip Ilkov (to Belasitsa)
—	DF	NGA	Emmanuel Baba (to Levski Sofia)
—	MF	BUL	Ivaylo Petev (to Litex)
—	MF	NGA	Richard Eromoigbe (loan return to Levski Sofia)
—	MF	NGA	Omonigho Temile (to Levski Sofia)
—	FW	BUL	Stefan Yurukov (to (China) Liaoning Whowin)
—	FW	BRA	Ângelo da Silva (released)

== Squad ==
=== League Statistics ===
Pos.	Nat.	Name	App	Goals
GK	(Bulgaria)	Ivaylo Petrov	?	0
GK	(Bulgaria)	Tihomir Todorov	?	0
GK	(Bulgaria)	Todor Todorov	0	0
DF	(Bulgaria)	Gosho Ginchev	23	1
DF	(Uzbekistan)	Aleksey Dionisiev	7	0
DF	(Bulgaria)	Adalbert Zafirov	24	5
DF	(Serbia and Montenegro)	Miroslav Milošević	?	0
DF	(Brazil)	Lúcio Wagner	20	0
DF	(Bosnia and Herzegovina)	Dalibor Dragić	11	1
DF	(Bulgaria)	Stefan Goshev	?	0
DF	(Bulgaria)	Diyan Donchev	4	0
MF	(Bulgaria)	Slavi Zhekov	?	3
MF	(Bulgaria)	Georgi Iliev	18	3
MF	(Russia)	Vladimir Gerasimov	20	2
MF	(Bulgaria)	Ivo Mihaylov	?	2
MF	(Bulgaria)	Marin Petrov	14	1
MF	(Bulgaria)	Asen Bukarev	25	3
MF	(Bulgaria)	Kristiyan Dobrev	3	0
MF	(Bulgaria)	Konstantin Mirchev	?	2
MF	(Bulgaria)	Stanislav Stoyanov	8	0
MF	(Bulgaria)	Stanislav Rumenov	?	0
FW	(Bulgaria)	Emil Todorov	?	1
FW	(Malta)	Daniel Bogdanović	7	0
FW	(Serbia and Montenegro)	Darko Spalević	13	7
FW	(Bulgaria)	Kostadin Bashov	13	1

Players, who left the club during a season

Pos.	Nat.	Name	App	Goals
GK	(Bulgaria)	Zdravko Zdravkov	12	0
DF	(Bulgaria)	Yanek Kyuchukov	8	0
DF	(Nigeria)	Emmanuel Baba	?	0
DF	(Bulgaria)	Filip Ilkov	0	0
MF	(Bulgaria)	Ivaylo Petev	10	1
MF	(Nigeria)	Richard Eromoigbe	3	0
MF	(Nigeria)	Omonigho Temile	12	1
FW	(Bulgaria)	Stefan Yurukov	10	6
FW	(Brazil)	Ângelo da Silva	6	0

== Matches ==
=== A Group ===
10 August 2002 Round 1	Cherno More	0 – 0	Levski Sofia	Nesebar
18:00 EEST	Ginchev (yellow card); Gerasimov (yellow card); Gerasimov (red card) 70'		Golovskoy (yellow card); Stoilov (yellow card); Pantelić (yellow card); Bachkov (yellow card); Topuzakov (red card) 70'	Stadium: Nesebar; Attendance: 10,000; Referee: Kamen Aleksiev (Veliko Tarnovo)

17 August 2002 Round 2	Botev Plovdiv	0 – 1	Cherno More	Plovdiv
18:00 EEST			Temile 45+1'	Stadium: Hristo Botev

24 August 2002 Round 3	Cherno More	0 – 0	Litex Lovech	Varna
18:00 EEST				Stadium: Ticha

31 August 2002 Round 4	Naftex Burgas	2 – 1	Cherno More	Burgas
17:30 EEST	Krastev 14'; Sakaliev 19'		M. Petrov 55'	Stadium: Lazur

15 September 2002 Round 5	Cherno More	2 – 1	Spartak Varna	Varna
17:00 EEST	G. Iliev 1'; Zafirov 62'		M. Georgiev 3'; Trenchev (red card) 78'; N. Stanchev (red card) 81'	Stadium: Ticha

21 September 2002 Round 6	Lokomotiv Sofia	0 – 0	Cherno More	Sofia
17:00 EEST	Ashimov (yellow card)	report	Stoyanov (yellow card)	Stadium: Lokomotiv; Attendance: 2,500; Referee: Galin Muskalev (Yambol)

28 September 2002 Round 7	Cherno More	0 – 1	CSKA Sofia	Varna
16:00 EEST	Mihaylov (red card) 73'	report	V. Dimitrov 71'; Brito (red card) 90'	Stadium: Ticha; Attendance: 8,000; Referee: Anton Genov (Gabrovo)

5 October 2002 Round 8	Lokomotiv Plovdiv	4 – 1	Cherno More	Plovdiv
16:00 EEST	Stoynev 20'; Donev 45+2'; Stoyanov 65' (o.g.); M. Zafirov 90+1'		Yurukov 69'	Stadium: Lokomotiv

19 October 2002 Round 9	Cherno More	2 – 1	Dobrudzha Dobrich	Varna
16:00 EEST	Yurukov 19', 22'; Kyuchukov (yellow card)	report	K. Todorov 69'; A. Georgiev (yellow card)	Stadium: Ticha; Attendance: 1,500; Referee: Kancho Dimitrov (Sofia)

26 October 2002 Round 10	Chernomorets Burgas	1 – 2	Cherno More	Burgas
16:00 EEST	P. Kolev 76'; Hristiyanov (yellow card)	report	Yurukov 45'; Bukarev 90'; Rumenov (yellow card); Kyuchukov (yellow card); Ginchev (yellow card); Yurukov (yellow card)	Stadium: Chernomorets; Attendance: 300; Referee: Kostadin Kostadinov (Sofia)

2 November 2002 Round 11	Cherno More	4 – 0	Rilski Sportist	Varna
14:30 EEST	Petev 16'; Yurukov 18'; Ginchev 27'; Mihaylov 90'	report	Georgiev (yellow card)	Stadium: Ticha; Attendance: 2,000; Referee: Georgi Videlov (Burgas)

9 November 2002 Round 12	Cherno More	2 – 0	Marek Dupnitsa	Varna
14:30 EEST	Yurukov 25'; Bukarev 30'; Petev (yellow card)	report	Koemdzhiev (yellow card); Lyubenov (yellow card)	Stadium: Ticha; Attendance: 1,000; Referee: Georgi Narlev (Silistra)

23 November 2002 Round 13	Slavia Sofia	1 – 0	Cherno More	Sofia
14:30 EEST	Rangelov 57'		Milošević (red card) 25'	Stadium: Slavia

23 February 2003 Round 14	Levski Sofia	1 – 0	Cherno More	Sofia
14:30 EEST	Chilikov 9'; Simonović (yellow card); Ibraimov (yellow card); Stoilov (yellow card); Genchev (yellow card)	report	T. Todorov (yellow card); Wagner (yellow card); Zhekov (yellow card); Mirchev (yellow card); Spalević (yellow card)	Stadium: Georgi Asparuhov; Attendance: 3,000; Referee: Kostadin Kostadinov (Sofia)

28 February 2003 Round 15	Cherno More	4 – 0	Botev Plovdiv	Varna
14:30 EEST	Zafirov 7', 37'; Spalević 39', 47'			Stadium: Ticha

14 March 2003 Round 16	Litex Lovech	0 – 2	Cherno More	Lovech
16:00 EEST			E. Todorov 41'; Zhekov 89'	Stadium: Lovech

15 March 2003 Round 17	Cherno More	3 – 1	Naftex Burgas	Varna
15:30 EEST	Bukarev 18'; Zhekov 47'; Mirchev 76'; Dionisiev (yellow card); Zafirov (yellow card); Wagner (yellow card); E. Todorov (yellow card)	report	Spasov 56'; Gospodinov (yellow card); Orachev (yellow card); Krastev (yellow card); Morales (yellow card); Timnev (yellow card); Kiselichkov (yellow card); St. Dimitrov (yellow card)	Stadium: Ticha; Attendance: 4,500; Referee: Yordan Ivanov (Sofia)

22 March 2003 Round 18	Spartak Varna	2 – 1	Cherno More	Varna
15:00 EEST	V. Stanchev 5'; Nankov 41'; Mechedzhiev (yellow card); An. Petrov (yellow card); Krizmanić (yellow card); Antunović (yellow card)	report	Spalević 51'; Ginchev (yellow card); Gerasimov (yellow card); Bukarev (yellow card); Mirchev (yellow card)	Stadium: Spartak; Attendance: 6,000; Referee: Ivan Dobrinov (Sofia)

5 April 2003 Round 19	Cherno More	3 – 0	Lokomotiv Sofia	Varna
16:00 EEST	Spalević 7', 26', 46'; Zafirov (yellow card) 78'	report	Y. Petkov (yellow card) 9'; Uchikov (yellow card) 87'	Stadium: Ticha; Attendance: 1,500; Referee: Georgi Narlev (Silistra)

12 April 2003 Round 20	CSKA Sofia	1 – 2	Cherno More	Sofia
17:45 EEST	Gargorov 29' (pen.); João Carlos (yellow card)	report	Sv. Petrov 45' (o.g.); G. Iliev 75'; Wagner (yellow card); Dragić (yellow card); Zafirov (yellow card); Gerasimov (yellow card); Bukarev (yellow card); G. Iliev (yellow card); E. Todorov (yellow card); Spalević (yellow card)	Stadium: Balgarska Armia; Attendance: 5,000; Referee: Georgi Videlov (Burgas)

19 April 2003 Round 21	Cherno More	1 – 0	Lokomotiv Plovdiv	Varna
17:00 EEST	Neshadov 33' (o.g.); Mirchev (yellow card); Mihaylov (yellow card); Zhekov (yellow card); Milošević (yellow card)	report	Kotev (yellow card); P. Kolev (yellow card); Neshadov (yellow card); Paskov (yellow card); Kamburov (yellow card)	Stadium: Ticha; Attendance: 2,000; Referee: Dimitar Dimitrov (Sofia)

26 April 2003 Round 22	Dobrudzha Dobrich	1 – 1	Cherno More	Dobrich
17:00 EEST	Genchev 72'		G. Iliev 53'	Stadium: Druzhba

11 May 2003 Round 23	Cherno More	2 – 2	Chernomorets Burgas	Kyustendil
18:00 EEST	Spalević 28'; Mihaylov 78'		Martinov 51'; P. Kolev 90+3'	Stadium: Osogovo; Attendance: 1,000; Referee: Tsvetan Georgiev (Sofia)

17 May 2003 Round 24	Rilski Sportist	1 – 3	Cherno More	Samokov
17:00 EEST	Kirov 67' (pen.); Patnikov (yellow card)	report	Gerasimov 68'; Zafirov 83'; Zhekov 86'; Zhekov (yellow card); Dragić (yellow card); Wagner (yellow card)	Stadium: Iskar; Attendance: 150; Referee: Dimitar Kostov (Burgas)

24 May 2003 Round 25	Marek Dupnitsa	1 – 1	Cherno More	Dupnitsa
17:00 EEST	Bibishkov 82'; Vazharov (yellow card)	report	Zafirov 38'; Zafirov (yellow card); Bashov (yellow card); Spalević (yellow card); G. Iliev (red card) 75'	Stadium: Bonchuk; Attendance: 500; Referee: Dimitar Dimitrov (Sofia)

31 May 2003 Round 26	Cherno More	4 – 0	Slavia Sofia	Varna
17:30 EEST	Gerasimov 9'; Mirchev 26'; Bashov 50'; Dragić 59'			Stadium: Ticha

==== League table ====
Pos	Team	Pld	W	D	L	GF	GA	GD	Pts	Qualification or relegation
3	Litex Lovech	26	17	4	5	49	22	+27	55	Qualification for UEFA Cup qualifying round
4	Slavia Sofia	26	16	3	7	57	30	+27	51	
5	Cherno More	26	14	6	6	42	21	+21	48	
6	Lokomotiv Plovdiv (Note: Lokomotiv Plovdiv were docked three points for failure to show in the round 17 match.)	26	16	2	8	56	33	+23	47	
7	Spartak Varna	26	10	4	12	25	34	−9	34	

Source: A PFG (in Bulgarian)
Rules for classification: 1st points; 2nd head-to-head points; 3rd head-to-head goal difference; 4th head-to-head goals scored; 5th head-to-head away goals scored; 6th season goal difference; 7th season goals scored; 8th "sportsmanship" (R & Y cards); 9th draw

==== Results summary ====
Overall								Home						Away					
Pld	W	D	L	GF	GA	GD	Pts	W	D	L	GF	GA	GD	W	D	L	GF	GA	GD
26	14	6	6	42	21	+21	48	9	3	1	27	6	+21	5	3	5	15	15	0

==== League performance ====
Round	1	2	3	4	5	6	7	8	9	10	11	12	13	14	15	16	17	18	19	20	21	22	23	24	25	26
Ground	H	A	H	A	H	A	H	A	H	A	H	H	A	A	H	A	H	A	H	A	H	A	H	A	A	H
Result	D	W	D	L	W	D	L	L	W	W	W	W	L	L	W	W	W	L	W	W	W	D	D	W	D	W
Position	8	6	8	9	7	8	8	10	7	5	6	6	6	7	6	6	5	6	6	6	5	6	6	6	6	6

A = Away; H = Home; W = Win; D = Draw; L = Loss

==== Goalscorers in A Group ====
Rank	Scorer	Goals
1	(Serbia and Montenegro) Darko Spalević	7
2	(Bulgaria) Stefan Yurukov	6
3	(Bulgaria) Adalbert Zafirov	5
4	(Bulgaria) Georgi Iliev	3
4	(Bulgaria) Asen Bukarev	3
4	(Bulgaria) Slavi Zhekov	3
7	(Bulgaria) Ivo Mihaylov	2
7	(Russia) Vladimir Gerasimov	2
7	(Bulgaria) Konstantin Mirchev	2
10	(Nigeria) Omonigho Temile	1
10	(Bulgaria) Marin Petrov	1
10	(Bulgaria) Ivaylo Petev	1
10	(Bulgaria) Gosho Ginchev	1
10	(Bulgaria) Emil Todorov	1
10	(Bulgaria) Kostadin Bashov	1
10	(Bosnia and Herzegovina) Dalibor Dragić	1
