= 2003–04 PFC Levski Sofia season =

Levski Sofia
2003–04 season
- Chairman: (Bulgaria) Todor Batkov
- Manager: (Bulgaria) Georgi Todorov (until October 2003) (Bulgaria) Georgi Vasilev
- Stadium: Georgi Asparuhov Stadium
- A Group: Second place
- Bulgarian Cup: Quarter-finals
- UEFA Cup: 3rd Round
- Top goalscorer: League: Georgi Chilikov (14 goals); All: Georgi Chilikov (18 goals)
- Highest home attendance: 42,281 vs Liverpool (3 March 2004)
- Lowest home attendance: 500 vs Botev Plovdiv (7 December 2003)

The 2003–04 season was Levski Sofia's 82nd season in the First League. This article shows player statistics and all matches (official and friendly) that the club will play during the 2003–04 season.

== First-team squad ==
Squad at end of season

Note: Flags indicate national team as defined under FIFA eligibility rules; some limited exceptions apply. Players may hold more than one non-FIFA nationality.

No.	Pos.	Nation	Player
1	GK	BUL	Georgi Petkov
2	MF	BUL	Daniel Peev
3	DF	BUL	Zhivko Milanov
4	MF	BUL	Biser Ivanov
5	DF	BUL	Georgi Markov
6	MF	NGR	Richard Eromoigbe
7	MF	BUL	Daniel Borimirov
8	MF	BUL	Kostadin Vidolov
9	FW	BUL	Georgi Ivanov
10	FW	BUL	Todor Kolev
11	DF	BUL	Elin Topuzakov
13	MF	BUL	Asen Bukarev
14	MF	RUS	Vladimir Gerasimov
15	MF	SCG	Saša Simonović
16	DF	BUL	Stefan Donchev
17	MF	RUS	Konstantin Golovskoy

No.	Pos.	Nation	Player
18	MF	BUL	Anton Kostadinov
19	FW	BUL	Georgi Chilikov
20	MF	BUL	Stanislav Angelov
21	MF	BUL	Dimitar Telkiyski
22	DF	BUL	Ilian Stoyanov
23	DF	BUL	Martin Stankov
24	DF	BUL	Veselin Vachev
25	DF	BRA	Lucio Wagner
26	MF	NGR	Omonigho Temile
27	GK	BUL	Dimitar Ivankov
28	FW	BUL	Emil Angelov
29	DF	NGR	Emmanuel Baba
30	MF	BUL	Kostadin Bashov
77	MF	BUL	Lyubomir Lyubenov
99	FW	GAM	Njogu Demba-Nyrén
—	GK	BUL	Vihren Uzunov

== Competitions ==
=== A Group ===
==== Table ====
Pos	Team	Pld	W	D	L	GF	GA	GD	Pts	Qualification or relegation
1	Lokomotiv Plovdiv (C)	30	24	3	3	74	24	+50	75	Qualification for Champions League second qualifying round
2	Levski Sofia	30	22	6	2	59	16	+43	72	Qualification for UEFA Cup second qualifying round
3	CSKA Sofia	30	20	5	5	65	28	+37	65	Qualification for UEFA Cup second qualifying round
4	Litex Lovech	30	18	10	2	43	20	+23	64	Qualification for UEFA Cup second qualifying round
5	Slavia Sofia	30	18	3	9	57	30	+27	57	

Source: A PFG (in Bulgarian)
Rules for classification: 1st points; 2nd head-to-head points; 3rd head-to-head goal difference; 4th head-to-head goals scored; 5th head-to-head away goals scored; 6th season goal difference; 7th season goals scored; 8th "sportsmanship" (R & Y cards); 9th draw
(C) Champions

==== Results summary ====
Overall								Home						Away					
Pld	W	D	L	GF	GA	GD	Pts	W	D	L	GF	GA	GD	W	D	L	GF	GA	GD
30	22	6	2	59	16	+43	72	12	3	0	38	5	+33	10	3	2	21	11	+10

Last updated: 15 May 2004.
Source: Soccerway

==== Results by round ====
Round	1	2	3	4	5	6	7	8	9	10	11	12	13	14	15	16	17	18	19	20	21	22	23	24	25	26	27	28	29	30
Ground	A	H	A	A	H	A	H	A	H	A	H	A	H	A	H	H	A	H	H	A	H	A	H	A	H	A	H	A	H	A
Result	W	W	D	D	W	W	D	L	W	W	D	W	W	W	W	W	W	W	D	L	W	D	W	W	W	W	W	W	W	W
Position	5	3	3	3	3	3	4	4	4	3	4	4	4	4	4	2	2	2	2	4	3	4	4	4	4	2	2	2	2	2

A = Away; H = Home; W = Win; D = Draw; L = Loss

==== Fixtures and results ====
8 August 2003 1	Chernomorets Burgas	1–2	Levski Sofia	Burgas
(EET)	Kaloyanov 17'	Report	Chilikov 10'; Temile 32'	Stadium: Chernomorets Stadium; Attendance: 8,000; Referee: Tsvetan Georgiev

17 August 2003 2	Levski Sofia	2–0	Vidima-Rakovski	Sofia
(EET)	Temile 33'; G. Ivanov 68'	Report		Stadium: Georgi Asparuhov Stadium; Attendance: 7,500; Referee: Angel Bekyarov

23 August 2003 3	Lokomotiv Sofia	1–1	Levski Sofia	Sofia
(EET)	Kaptiev 53'	Report	G. Ivanov 25' (pen.)	Stadium: Lokomotiv Stadium; Attendance: 8,000; Referee: Dimitar Dimitrov

31 August 2003 4	Litex Lovech	0–0	Levski Sofia	Lovech
(EET)		Report		Stadium: Lovech Stadium; Attendance: 5,000; Referee: Momchil Vraykov

13 September 2003 5	Levski Sofia	3–0	Rodopa Smolyan	Sofia
(EET)	Simonović 4'; Topuzakov 37' (pen.); Telkiyski 90'	Report		Stadium: Georgi Asparuhov Stadium; Attendance: 2,000; Referee: Petar Stoyanov

19 September 2003 6	Belasitsa Petrich	0–1	Levski Sofia	Petrich
(EET)		Report	Topuzakov 76' (pen.)	Stadium: Tsar Samuil Stadium; Attendance: 5,000; Referee: Tsvetan Georgiev

28 September 2003 7	Levski Sofia	0–0	Cherno More	Sofia
(EET)		Report		Stadium: Georgi Asparuhov Stadium; Attendance: 4,300; Referee: Galin Muskalev

3 October 2003 8	Lokomotiv Plovdiv	3–1	Levski Sofia	Plovdiv
(EET)	V. Ivanov 41'; Kamburov 43'; Jančevski 50'	Report	Chilikov 73'	Stadium: Lokomotiv Stadium; Attendance: 12,000; Referee: Kostadin Kostadinov

19 October 2003 9	Levski Sofia	3–0	Naftex Burgas	Sofia
(EET)	Morales 20' (o.g.); Chilikov 42'; Kolev 84'	Report		Stadium: Georgi Asparuhov Stadium; Attendance: 2,000; Referee: Momchil Vraykov

24 October 2003 10	Slavia Sofia	1–2	Levski Sofia	Sofia
(EET)	Rangelov 41'	Report	Topuzakov 45'; Simonović 55'	Stadium: Ovcha Kupel Stadium; Attendance: 3,000; Referee: Ivan Dobrinov

31 October 2003 11	Levski Sofia	1–1	CSKA Sofia	Sofia
(EET)	Gargorov 53'	Report	Kolev 54'	Stadium: Georgi Asparuhov Stadium; Attendance: 16,000; Referee: Angel Bekyarov

9 November 2003 12	Makedonska slava	1–2	Levski Sofia	Simitli
(EET)	Yanev 51'	Report	Golovskoy 56'; Chilikov 73'	Stadium: Struma Stadium; Attendance: 4,500; Referee: Dimitar Kostov

21 November 2003 13	Levski Sofia	3–0	Marek Dupnitsa	Sofia
(EET)	G. Ivanov 16' (pen.); Temile 31'; Chilikov 35'	Report		Stadium: Georgi Asparuhov Stadium; Attendance: 2,000; Referee: Kolyo Danev

30 November 2003 14	Spartak Varna	0–2	Levski Sofia	Varna
(EET)		Report	Bukarev 2', 12'	Stadium: Spartak Stadium; Attendance: 2,000; Referee: Kamen Aleksiev

7 December 2003 15	Levski Sofia	3–1	Botev Plovdiv	Sofia
(EET)	G. Ivanov 14', 20' (pen.); Chilikov 37'	Report	Karamanov 83'	Stadium: Georgi Asparuhov Stadium; Attendance: 500; Referee: Georgi Ignatov

14 February 2004 16	Levski Sofia	3–0	Chernomorets Burgas	Sofia
(EET)	Temile 57'; Chilikov 65'; Angelov 90'	Report		Stadium: Vasil Levski National Stadium; Attendance: 2,300; Referee: Galin Muskalev

20 February 2004 17	Vidima-Rakovski	0–3	Levski Sofia	Sevlievo
(EET)		Report	G. Ivanov 66'; Chilikov 78'; Angelov 86'	Stadium: Rakovski Stadium; Attendance: 3,500; Referee: Hristo Ristoskov

11 March 2004 18	Levski Sofia	3–0	Lokomotiv Sofia	Sofia
(EET)	Lyubenov 44'; G. Ivanov 54'; Vidolov 76'	Report		Stadium: Georgi Asparuhov Stadium; Attendance: 1,400; Referee: Kostadin Kostadinov

7 March 2004 19	Levski Sofia	1–1	Litex Lovech	Sofia
(EET)	Borimirov 90'	Report	Dimitrov 78'	Stadium: Georgi Asparuhov Stadium; Attendance: 10,000; Referee: Galin Muskalev

14 March 2004 20	Rodopa Smolyan	2–1	Levski Sofia	Smolyan
(EET)	Stoychev 14'; Koprivarov 16'	Report	Lyubenov 45'	Stadium: Septemvri Stadium; Attendance: 6,000; Referee: Kamen Aleksiev

20 March 2004 21	Levski Sofia	4–2	Belasitsa Petrich	Sofia
(EET)	Lyubenov 17'; Simonović 25'; Chilikov 50'; Angelov 74'	Report	Junivan 10'; Vavá 30'	Stadium: Georgi Asparuhov Stadium; Attendance: 2,500; Referee: Angel Bekyarov

28 March 2004 22	Cherno More	0–0	Levski Sofia	Varna
(EET)		Report		Stadium: Ticha Stadium; Attendance: 8,000; Referee: Stefan Gospodinov

3 April 2004 23	Levski Sofia	3–0	Lokomotiv Plovdiv	Sofia
(EET)	Topuzakov 49'; Bukarev 71'; G. Ivanov 83'	Report		Stadium: Georgi Asparuhov Stadium; Attendance: 10,000; Referee: Anton Genov

10 April 2004 24	Naftex Burgas	0–1	Levski Sofia	Burgas
(EET)		Report	Borimirov 60'	Stadium: Lazur Stadium; Attendance: 5,000; Referee: Hristo Ristoskov

16 April 2004 25	Levski Sofia	1–0	Slavia Sofia	Sofia
(EET)	G. Ivanov 7' (pen.)	Report		Stadium: Georgi Asparuhov Stadium; Attendance: 5,000; Referee: Kostadin Kostadinov

24 April 2004 26	CSKA Sofia	1–2	Levski Sofia	Sofia
(EET)	Yanev 64'	Report	Temile 85'; G. Ivanov 90'	Stadium: Balgarska Armiya Stadium; Attendance: 18,000; Referee: Kostadin Kostadinov

1 May 2004 27	Levski Sofia	6–0	Makedonska slava	Sofia
(EET)	Temile 8', 41'; Chilikov 30', 40'; Bukarev 61'; Kolev 75'	Report		Stadium: Georgi Asparuhov Stadium; Attendance: 1,000; Referee: Stanislav Todorov

5 May 2004 28	Marek Dupnitsa	0–1	Levski Sofia	Dupnitsa
(EET)		Report	Telkiyski 64'	Stadium: Bonchuk Stadium; Attendance: 1,300; Referee: Anton Genov

8 May 2004 29	Levski Sofia	2–0	Spartak Varna	Sofia
(EET)	Chilikov 32'; Borimirov 44'	Report		Stadium: Georgi Asparuhov Stadium; Attendance: 1,000; Referee: Dimitar Kostov

15 May 2004 30	Botev Plovdiv	1–2	Levski Sofia	Plovdiv
(EET)	Dafchev 59'	Report	Chilikov 38'; Kolev 77'	Stadium: Hristo Botev Stadium; Attendance: 8,000; Referee: Momchil Vraykov

=== Bulgarian Cup ===
28 October 2003 Second round 1st leg	Vihren Sandanski	0–0	Levski Sofia	Sandanski
(EET)		Report		Stadium: Sandanski Stadium; Attendance: 2,000; Referee: Kancho Dimitrov

13 November 2003 Second round 2nd leg	Levski Sofia	4–1 (4–1 agg.)	Vihren Sandanski	Sofia
(EET)	Dimitrov 28', 44', 90'; Telkiyski 44'	Report	Durchov 84'	Stadium: Georgi Asparuhov Stadium; Attendance: 500; Referee: Angel Angelov

3 December 2003 Third round 1st leg	Marek Dupnitsa	2–2	Levski Sofia	Dupnitsa
14:00 (EET)	Pargov 5'; Bibishkov 63'	Report	Chilikov 41'; Bukarev 54'	Stadium: Bonchuk; Attendance: 1,500; Referee: Stoyan Aleksiev

10 December 2003 Third round 2nd leg	Levski Sofia	4–1 (6–3 agg.)	Marek Dupnitsa	Sofia
13:00 (EET)	Demba-Nyrén 8'; Temile 25'; Topuzakov 54'; Chilikov 67'	Report	Lyubenov 34' (pen.)	Stadium: Georgi Asparuhov Stadium; Attendance: 500; Referee: Anton Genov

14 December 2003 Quarterfinal 1st leg	Levski Sofia	1–1	Lokomotiv Plovdiv	Sofia
13:00 (EET)	Demba-Nyrén 55'	Report	Kamburov 66'	Stadium: Georgi Asparuhov Stadium; Attendance: 6,000; Referee: Tsvetan Georgiev

18 December 2003 Quarterfinal 2nd leg	Lokomotiv Plovdiv	3–0 (4–1 agg.)	Levski Sofia	Plovdiv
13:00 (EET)	Mihaylov 22'; Kamburov 45+3'; Milovanović 89'	Report		Stadium: Lokomotiv Stadium; Attendance: 7,000; Referee: Dimitar Kostov

=== UEFA Cup ===
==== Qualifying round ====
14 August 2003 1st leg	Atyrau (Kazakhstan)	1–4	(Bulgaria) Levski Sofia	Atyrau, Kazakhstan
14:30	Agabayev 88'	Report	Chilikov 9'; G. Ivanov 13', 33'; Temile 20'	Stadium: Munayshy Stadium; Attendance: 9,000; Referee: Ali Aydin (Turkey)

28 August 2003 2nd leg	Levski Sofia (Bulgaria)	2–0 (6–1 agg.)	(Kazakhstan) Atyrau	Sofia, Bulgaria
19:30	G. Ivanov 27'; Telkiyski 69'	Report		Stadium: Georgi Asparuhov Stadium; Attendance: 8,000; Referee: Olegário Benquerença (Portugal)

==== First round ====
24 September 2003 1st leg	Hapoel Ramat Gan (Israel)	0–1	(Bulgaria) Levski Sofia	Dunajská Streda, Slovakia
15:30		Report	Dimitrov 80'	Stadium: Mestský Stadion; Attendance: 1,468; Referee: Lawrence Sammut (Malta)

15 October 2003 2nd leg	Levski Sofia (Bulgaria)	4–0 (5–0 agg.)	(Israel) Hapoel Ramat Gan	Sofia, Bulgaria
17:30	Chilikov 23'; G. Ivanov 75'; Simonović 79'; Demba-Nyrén 90'	Report		Stadium: Georgi Asparuhov Stadium; Attendance: 6,000; Referee: Georgios Douros (Greece)

==== Second round ====
6 November 2003 1st leg	Slavia Prague (Czech Republic)	2–2	(Bulgaria) Levski Sofia	Prague, Czech Republic
17:00	Kuka 22'; Fořt 90+2'	Report	G. Ivanov 77'; Müller 90+1' (o.g.)	Stadium: Stadion Evžena Rošického; Attendance: 5,000; Referee: Mike McCurry (Scotland)

27 November 2003 2nd leg	Levski Sofia (Bulgaria)	0–0 (2–2 (a) agg.)	(Czech Republic) Slavia Prague	Sofia, Bulgaria
16:00		Report		Stadium: Georgi Asparuhov Stadium; Attendance: 25,000; Referee: Nicolai Vollquartz (Denmark)

==== Third round ====
26 February 2004 1st leg	Liverpool (England)	2–0	(Bulgaria) Levski Sofia	Liverpool, England
21:00	Gerrard 67'; Kewell 70'	Report		Stadium: Anfield; Attendance: 39,149; Referee: René Temmink (Netherlands)

3 March 2004 2nd leg	Levski Sofia (Bulgaria)	2–4 (2–6 agg.)	(England) Liverpool	Sofia, Bulgaria
20:10	G. Ivanov 27'; Simonović 40'	Report	Gerrard 7'; Owen 11'; Hamann 43'; Hyypiä 68'	Stadium: Vasil Levski National Stadium; Attendance: 42,281; Referee: Peter Fröjdfeldt (Sweden)
