= Darko Savić =

Serbian footballer (born 1979)

Personal information
- Date of birth: 19 January 1979 (age 47)
- Place of birth: Vršac, SFR Yugoslavia
- Height: 1.82 m (6 ft 0 in)
- Positions: Centre-back; right-back

Team information
- Current team: Septemvri Sofia II (manager)

Youth career
- Vršac

Senior career*
Years	Team	Apps	(Gls)
1998–2002	Sartid Smederevo		
2002–2004	Spartak Varna	37	(0)
2004–2011	Lokomotiv Sofia	176	(1)
2012–2015	Botev Vratsa	67	(1)
2015–2016	Lokomotiv Sofia	16	(1)
2017–2018	Botev Ihtiman	10	(0)
2018–2019	Sportist Svoge	32	(0)
2020–2021	Kostinbrod		

Managerial career
- 2019–2020: Sportist Svoge
- 2020–2021: Kostinbrod (assistant)
- 2021–: Septemvri Sofia II
- * Club domestic league appearances and goals

Darko Savić (Serbian Cyrillic: Дарко Савић; born 19 January 1979) is a retired Serbian footballer who played as a defender and manager of Septemvri Sofia II. He has played much of his career in a centre-back role, but he has also been used as a right-back.

== Playing career ==
Savić began his career with Sartid Smederevo. After four years of playing in the First League of FR Yugoslavia, he was signed by Spartak Varna in the summer of 2002.

=== Spartak Varna ===
Savić made his Bulgarian A PFG debut on 10 August 2002, replacing Stefan Donchev in a 3–1 away loss against CSKA Sofia. Seven days later, he made his first start for Spartak, in a 1–0 loss against Lokomotiv Plovdiv at Spartak Stadium.

On 24 February 2004, Savić scored an own goal in a 2–1 home loss against Cherno More in the derby of Varna.

=== Lokomotiv Sofia ===
On 3 September 2004, Savić joined Lokomotiv Sofia on a free transfer. He made his first league appearance for Lokomotiv in the 4–0 defeat by Lokomotiv Plovdiv on 11 September.

On 18 April 2009, he scored his first goal in Bulgaria in a 3–2 win over Cherno More, opening the scoring with a trademark strike from 25 yards out. On 31 May Savić was sent off in a match against his previous side Spartak Varna for a foul on Angel Stoykov.

On 11 April 2011, Savić became the second foreign player after Nebojša Jelenković, who has made 200 appearances in the Bulgarian A PFG. As of March 2015, he has played 246 matches in the top division of Bulgarian football, being third in the all-time appearance list for foreigners. Savić is also the non-Bulgarian defender with the most games. It was announced on 10 June 2011 that, along with Valentin Galev, Kristian Dobrev, Marcho Dafchev and Rumen Goranov, Savić had agreed to sign a new two-year contract, which would keep him with Lokomotiv until 2013. The contract was finally signed on 19 June.

On 9 February 2012, his contract with Lokomotiv was terminated.

=== Botev Vratsa ===
On 14 February 2012, Savić joined Botev Vratsa. He made his debut for Botev in a 1–0 home loss against Slavia Sofia on 3 March.

== Managerial career ==
On 23 August 2019, Savić was appointed manager of Sportist Svoge. He was fired on 4 January 2020.

In February 2020, Savić was appointed manager of Kostinbrod. He left the position shortly before the start of the 2021–22 season.

== Career statistics ==
Club	Season	League		Cup		Europe		Total	
Club	Season	Apps	Goals	Apps	Goals	Apps	Goals	Apps	Goals
Spartak Varna	2002–03	18	0	2	0	–	–	20	0
Spartak Varna	2003–04	19	0	2	0	–	–	21	0
Spartak Varna	Total	37	0	4	0	–	–	41	0
Lokomotiv Sofia	2004–05	22	0	1	0	–	–	23	0
Lokomotiv Sofia	2005–06	26	0	0	0	–	–	26	0
Lokomotiv Sofia	2006–07	27	0	1	0	5	0	33	0
Lokomotiv Sofia	2007–08	26	0	3	0	4	0	33	0
Lokomotiv Sofia	2008–09	22	1	1	0	0	0	23	1
Lokomotiv Sofia	2009–10	23	0	0	0	–	–	23	0
Lokomotiv Sofia	2010–11	24	0	0	0	–	–	24	0
Lokomotiv Sofia	2011–12	6	0	0	0	3	0	9	0
Lokomotiv Sofia	Total	176	1	6	0	12	0	194	1
Botev Vratsa	2011–12	13	0	0	0	–	–	13	0
Botev Vratsa	2012–13	20	0	0	0	–	–	20	0
Botev Vratsa	2013–14	14	1	1	0	–	–	15	1
Botev Vratsa	2014–15	20	0	1	0	–	–	21	0
Botev Vratsa	Total	67	1	2	0	0	0	69	1
Lokomotiv 1929 Sofia	2015–16	16	1	0	0	–	–	16	1
Career total		296	3	12	0	12	0	320	3
