= Gospodinov =

Gospodinov (Bulgarian: Господинов) is a Bulgarian masculine surname, its feminine counterpart is Gospodinova. It may refer to:

- Anatoli Gospodinov (born 1994), Bulgarian football goalkeeper
- Bistra Gospodinova (born 1966), Bulgarian swimmer
- Georgi Gospodinov (born 1968), Bulgarian poet, writer and playwright
- Hristo Gospodinov (born 1979), Bulgarian football midfielder
- Kiril Gospodinov (1934–2003), Bulgarian theater and film actor
- Marian Gospodinov (born 1974), Bulgarian football player
- Stanimir Gospodinov (born 1975), Bulgarian football defender
- Valentina Gospodinova (born 1987), Bulgarian football striker
- Vanya Gospodinova (born 1958), Bulgarian middle-distance runner
- Vasil Gospodinov (born 1993), Bulgarian weightlifter
- Yordan Gospodinov (born 1978), Bulgarian football goalkeeper
- Zhivko Gospodinov (1957–2015), Bulgarian football player
