= Rumenov =

Rumenov (Bulgarian: Руменов) is a Bulgarian surname. Notable people with the surname include:

- Rumen Rumenov (born 1993), Bulgarian footballer
- Stanislav Rumenov (born 1980), Bulgarian footballer
