= Popchev =

Popchev or Poptchev is a Bulgarian surname (Bulgarian: Попчев), its female form Popcheva or Poptcheva. Notable people with the surname include:

- Eva-Maria Poptcheva (born 1979), Spanish Member of the European Parliament
- Milko Popchev (born 1964), Bulgarian chessmaster
- Steliyan Popchev (born 1976), Bulgarian footballer
