= Zhekov =

Zhekov (Bulgarian: Жеков) is a Bulgarian masculine surname, its feminine counterpart is Zhekova. It may refer to

- Aleksandra Zhekova (born 1987), Bulgarian snowboarder
- Andrey Zhekov, Bulgarian volleyball player
- Nikola Zhekov (1864–1949), Bulgarian statesman
- Petar Zhekov (1944–2023), Bulgarian football player
- Slavi Zhekov (born 1976), Bulgarian football player
- Stanislav Zhekov (born 1980), Bulgarian football player
