= Valentin Galev =

Bulgarian footballer

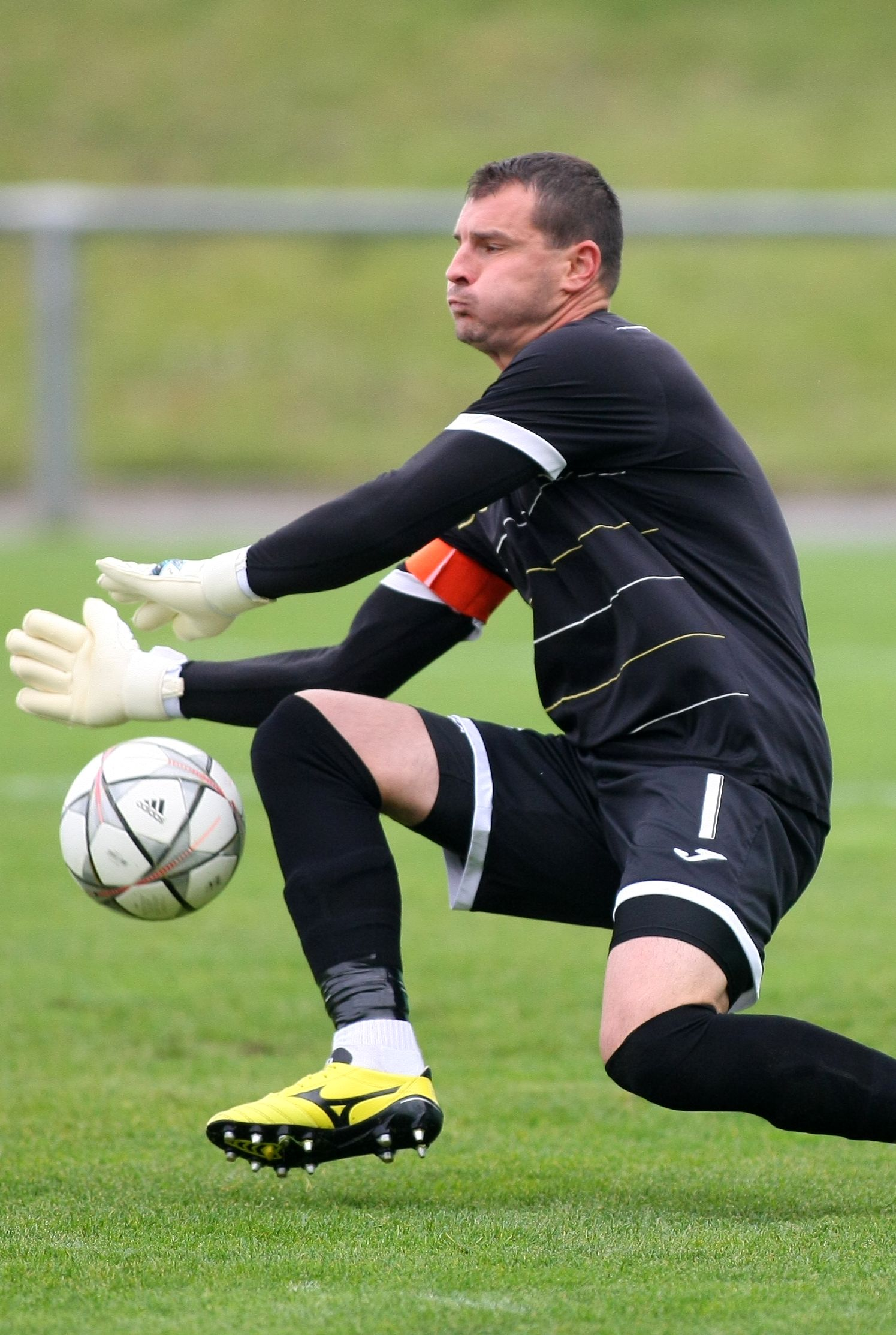

Personal information
- Full name: Valentin Plamenov Galev
- Date of birth: 1 January 1984 (age 42)
- Place of birth: Sofia, Bulgaria
- Height: 1.85 m (6 ft 1 in)
- Position: Goalkeeper

Team information
- Current team: Rilski Sportist
- Number: 1

Youth career
- Lokomotiv Sofia

Senior career*
Years	Team	Apps	(Gls)
2002–2015	Lokomotiv Sofia	111	(0)
2015–2016	Botev Plovdiv	1	(0)
2016–2020	Septemvri Sofia	64	(0)
2020–2022	Vitosha Bistritsa	38	(0)
2022–2024	Kostinbrod	64	(0)
2022–	Rilski Sportist	15	(0)

Managerial career
- 2021–2022: Vitosha Bistritsa (goalkeepers coach)
- * Club domestic league appearances and goals as of 13:17, 13 November 2024 (UTC)

Valentin Plamenov Galev (Bulgarian: Валентин Пламенов Галев; born 1 January 1984) is a Bulgarian professional footballer currently playing for Rilski Sportist as a goalkeeper. He also served as a goalkeepers coach for Vitosha Bistritsa.

== Career ==
Valentin Galev earned his first professional contract with Lokomotiv Sofia, signing from their academy in 2002. On 17 May 2003, Galev made his debut in Bulgarian A PFG when he replaced Daniel Peev in the 8th minute of the match against Litex Lovech following the sending-off of Vladimir Manolkov.

On 29 June 2015 Galev joined Botev Plovdiv. On 18 April 2016 his contract was terminated by mutual agreement. During his short spell at Botev Plovdiv Galev was injured most of the time and played in just a single game, the 1–1 draw with Lokomotiv Plovdiv.

On 25 May 2021 he was announced as the goalkeeper coach of Vitosha Bistritsa, who will also play for the team in Third League.

== Career statistics ==
As of 13 December 2017

Club performance			League		Cup		Continental		Other		Total	
Club	League	Season	Apps	Goals	Apps	Goals	Apps	Goals	Apps	Goals	Apps	Goals
Bulgaria			League		Bulgarian Cup		Europe		Other (Note: Includes Bulgarian Supercup matches.)		Total	
Lokomotiv Sofia	A Group	2002–03	2	0	0	0	–		–		2	0
Lokomotiv Sofia	A Group	2003–04	3	0	1	0	–		–		4	0
Lokomotiv Sofia	A Group	2004–05	4	0	1	0	–		–		5	0
Lokomotiv Sofia	A Group	2005–06	0	0	0	0	–		–		0	0
Lokomotiv Sofia	A Group	2006–07	3	0	0	0	0	0	–		3	0
Lokomotiv Sofia	A Group	2007–08	2	0	0	0	0	0	–		2	0
Lokomotiv Sofia	A Group	2008–09	15	0	0	0	0	0	–		15	0
Lokomotiv Sofia	A Group	2009–10	15	0	2	0	–		–		17	0
Lokomotiv Sofia	A Group	2010–11	7	0	0	0	–		–		7	0
Lokomotiv Sofia	A Group	2011–12	27	0	0	0	4	0	–		31	0
Lokomotiv Sofia	A Group	2012–13	14	0	2	0	–		–		16	0
Lokomotiv Sofia	A Group	2013–14	19	0	1	0	–		–		20	0
Lokomotiv Sofia	A Group	2014–15	0	0	4	0	–		–		4	0
Lokomotiv Sofia	Total		111	0	11	0	4	0	0	0	126	0
Botev Plovdiv	A Group	2015–16	1	0	0	0	—		—		1	0
Botev Plovdiv	Total		1	0	0	0	0	0	0	0	1	0
Septemvri Sofia	Second League	2016–17	28	0	1	0	–		1	0	30	0
Septemvri Sofia	First League	2017–18	4	0	0	0	–		–		4	0
Septemvri Sofia	Total		32	0	1	0	0	0	1	0	34	0
Career totals			144	0	12	0	4	0	1	0	161	0
