= Yanek Kyuchukov =

Bulgarian footballer and manager

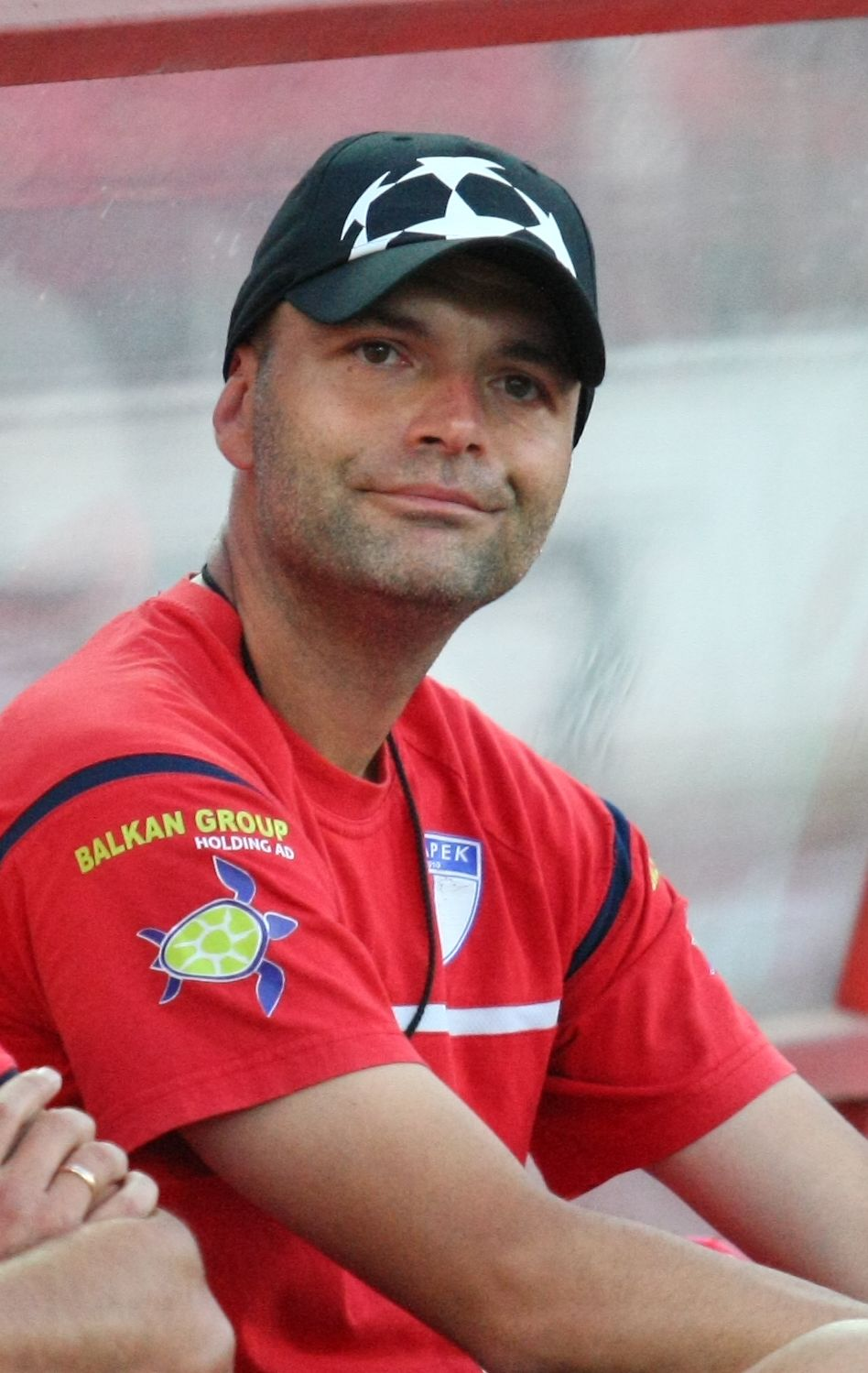

Personal information
- Full name: Yanek Emilov Kyuchukov
- Date of birth: 24 August 1974 (age 52)
- Place of birth: Dupnitsa, Bulgaria
- Height: 1.87 m (6 ft 2 in)
- Position: Defender

Team information
- Current team: Marek Dupnitsa (youth)

Youth career
- 1982–1993: Marek Dupnitsa

Senior career*
Years	Team	Apps	(Gls)
1993–1995	Marek Dupnitsa	26	(3)
1995–1999	Minyor Pernik	90	(3)
1999–2002	Litex Lovech	24	(1)
2001	→ Marek Dupnitsa (loan)	17	(1)
2002	→ Patraikos (loan)	11	(0)
2002	Cherno More	6	(0)
2003–2010	Marek Dupnitsa	114	(10)
Total		304	(29)

Managerial career
- 2014–2016: Marek Dupnitsa (assistant)
- 2016: Marek Dupnitsa
- 2016–2017: Marek Dupnitsa (assistant)
- 2021–: Marek Dupnitsa (youth)
- * Club domestic league appearances and goals as of 1 August 2010

Yanek Kuchukov (Bulgarian: Янек Кючуков) (born 24 August 1974) is a Bulgarian former football defender and currently manager of Marek Dupnitsa.

In the Bulgarian first division – the A PFG – Yanek has played in 171 matches and scored 11 goals.

- Height – 1.87 m.
- Weight – 76 kg.

Yanek has a brother, named Angelo, who is also a former professional footballer, having plied his trade for many of the same teams.

On 19 September 2016, Kyuchukov was appointed as manager of Marek Dupnitsa.
