= Dinei (footballer, born 1979) =

Brazilian footballer

Personal information
- Full name: Vatinei César Moreira dos Santos
- Date of birth: 10 December 1979 (age 46)
- Place of birth: Campos dos Goytacazes, Brazil
- Height: 1.82 m (5 ft 11 1/2 in)
- Position: Midfielder

Senior career*
Years	Team	Apps	(Gls)
1998–2000	Araçatuba		
2000–2001	Campo Grande (RJ)		
2001	Goiatuba		
2001–2004	Belasitsa Petrich		
2004–2006	Campo Grande (RJ)		
2006	Pogoń Szczecin		
2007	FK Srem	6	(0)
- * Club domestic league appearances and goals

Vatinei César Moreira dos Santos better known simply as Dinei (born 10 December 1979) is a Brazilian former professional footballer who played as a midfielder.

== External sources ==
- Dinei at 90minut.pl (in Polish)
- Profile at Srbijafudbal
