= Ivan Mekikov =

Bulgarian footballer (born 1982)

Personal information
- Full name: Ivan Tonov Mekikov
- Date of birth: 29 May 1982 (age 44)
- Place of birth: Plovdiv, Bulgaria
- Height: 1.81 m (5 ft 11 in)
- Position: Midfielder

Team information
- Current team: Vidima-Rakovski
- Number: 6

Youth career
- Maritsa Plovdiv

Senior career*
Years	Team	Apps	(Gls)
1999–2000	Maritsa Plovdiv	15	(3)
2001–2003	CSKA Sofia	3	(0)
2001	→ Cherno More (loan)	2	(0)
2003	→ Conegliano (loan)	12	(1)
2003–2006	Maritsa Plovdiv	81	(18)
2006–2008	Vidima-Rakovski	61	(4)
2008–2012	Spartak Plovdiv	54	(1)
2012–	Vidima-Rakovski	16	(0)

International career
	Bulgaria U21	5	(0)
- * Club domestic league appearances and goals as of 1 June 2013

Ivan Mekikov (Bulgarian: Иван Мекиков; born 29 May 1982) is a Bulgarian footballer, who plays as a midfielder for Vidima-Rakovski. He is a former member of the Bulgaria U21 team.
