= Georgi Karakanov =

Bulgarian footballer

Personal information
- Full name: Georgi Milchov Karakanov
- Date of birth: 2 March 1975 (age 51)
- Place of birth: Dupnitsa, Bulgaria
- Height: 1.82 m (6 ft 0 in)
- Position: Midfielder

Senior career*
Years	Team	Apps	(Gls)
1995–1999	Minyor Pernik	113	(8)
2000	Lokomotiv Sofia	10	(0)
2000–2003	Spartak Varna	33	(1)
2004–2006	Marek Dupnitsa	52	(3)
2006–2007	Naftex Burgas	22	(7)
2007–2009	Chernomorets Burgas	25	(6)
2009–2010	Marek Dupnitsa	30	(3)
2010–2012	Septemvri Simitli	34	(3)
- * Club domestic league appearances and goals

Georgi Karakanov (Bulgarian: Георги Караканов; born 2 March 1975) is a former Bulgarian professional footballer, who played as a midfielder.
