= Borislav Dimitrov (footballer, born 1979) =

Bulgarian footballer

Personal information
- Date of birth: 29 September 1979 (age 47)
- Place of birth: Sofia, Bulgaria
- Height: 1.80 m (5 ft 11 in)
- Position: Forward

Youth career
- 1986–1999: Levski Sofia

Senior career*
Years	Team	Apps	(Gls)
1999–2001	Levski Dolna Banya	?	(?)
2001–2003	Botev Plovdiv	43	(22)
2003	Levski Sofia	5	(0)
2004	Botev Plovdiv	13	(1)
2004	Marek Dupnitsa	3	(1)
2005	Botev Plovdiv	20	(2)
2006	Rodopa Smolyan	?	(?)
2006–2007	Maritsa Plovdiv	?	(?)
- * Club domestic league appearances and goals

Borislav Dimitrov (Bulgarian: Борислав Димитров; born 29 September 1979) is a Bulgarian former professional footballer who played as a forward. He played his last match in 2007 at age 28 due to an injury which forced his retirement.
