= Yonko Peykov =

Bulgarian former footballer

Personal information
- Full name: Yonko Milkov Peykov
- Date of birth: 3 August 1974 (age 52)
- Place of birth: Bulgaria
- Height: 1.84 m (6 ft 1/2 in)
- Position: Defender

Yonko Peykov (Bulgarian: Йонко Пейков) (born 3 August 1974) is a Bulgarian former footballer, who played for a number of professional clubs in the country, including Litex Lovech, Spartak Varna, Spartak Pleven, Vidima-Rakovski, Olympik Teteven, and Balkan Botevgrad.
