= Ângelo (footballer, born 1975) =

Brazilian footballer

Personal information
- Full name: Ângelo Marcos da Silva
- Date of birth: 8 January 1975 (age 51)
- Place of birth: Abaeté, Brazil
- Height: 1.69 m (5 ft 6 1/2 in)
- Position: Forward

Senior career*
Years	Team	Apps	(Gls)
2000	Mirassol		
2001–2002	Krylia Sovetov	28	(8)
2002	→ Alania (loan)	7	(1)
2002	Cherno More	6	(0)
- * Club domestic league appearances and goals

Ângelo Marcos da Silva or simply Ângelo (born 8 January 1975 in Abaeté) is a former Brazilian football player.

His debut in the Russian Football Premier League was very successful, he scored a hat-trick against FC Torpedo Moscow and was named player of the month for March 2001. However, he could not sustain the high level of play for a significant period.

Some sources list him playing in Bulgaria for PFC Cherno More Varna after leaving the Russian league, but that is possibly confusion with Marcos da Silva.
