= Stanimir Georgiev =

Bulgarian footballer

Personal information
- Full name: Stanimir Georgiev
- Date of birth: 7 August 1975 (age 51)
- Place of birth: Plovdiv, Bulgaria
- Height: 5 ft 11 in (1.80 m)
- Position: Forward

Senior career*
Years	Team	Apps	(Gls)
1996–1998	Lokomotiv Plovdiv	12	(0)
1998–1999	Dobrudzha Dobrich		
1999–2000	Chernomorets Burgas		
2000–2001	CSKA Sofia	10	(0)
2001	→ Cherno More (loan)	17	(3)
2002	Slavia Sofia		
2003	Kocaelispor	5	(0)
2003	Rodopa Smolyan		
2004	Gomel	15	(2)
2004	Spartak Varna	6	(0)
2005	Marsaxlokk	3	(0)
2005	Olympiacos Volos		
- * Club domestic league appearances and goals

Stanimir Georgiev (Bulgarian: Станимир Георгиев; born 7 August 1975 in Plovdiv, Bulgaria) is a retired Bulgarian professional football forward who played for several clubs in Europe.

== Club career ==
Georgiev played for PFC CSKA Sofia, PFC Slavia Sofia, PFC Rodopa Smolyan and PFC Spartak Varna in Bulgaria and FC Gomel in Belarus. He had a brief spell in the Turkish Super Lig with Kocaelispor.
