= Saša Simonović =

Serbian footballer

Personal information
- Date of birth: 20 July 1975 (age 51)
- Place of birth: Niš, SFR Yugoslavia
- Height: 1.77 m (5 ft 9 1/2 in)
- Position: Midfielder

Youth career
- 1988–1994: Radnički Niš

Senior career*
Years	Team	Apps	(Gls)
1994–1995	Železničar Niš	25	(3)
1995–1998	Aris	63	(7)
1998–2002	Obilić	101	(17)
2002–2005	Levski Sofia	64	(14)
2005–2006	Vihren Sandanski	20	(6)
2006–2008	Slavia Sofia	47	(10)
2008–2009	Lokomotiv Mezdra	23	(9)
2009–2010	Levski Sofia	6	(0)
Total		349	(66)

International career
2000	Serbia and Montenegro	1	(0)

Managerial career
- 2019: Botev Galabovo
- 2020–2021: Belasitsa Petrich
- * Club domestic league appearances and goals

Saša Simonović (Serbian Cyrillic: Саша Симоновић; born 20 July 1975) is a former Serbian footballer who played as a midfielder.

== Career ==
Simonović began his career with Radnički Niš, playing for the team between 1988 and 1994. He also played for Železničar Niš, Aris Thessaloniki and Obilić, before moving to Levski Sofia in 2002 for a fee of €750,000. He scored his first goal for the club in his first match against CSKA Sofia. In three seasons, Simonović earned 83 appearances for Levski and scored 20 goals. In June 2005 Simonović transferred to Vihren Sandanski.

From 2006 to 2008, Simonović played for Slavia Sofia. In the 2008–09 season he was a part of Lokomotiv Mezdra.

On 5 August 2009, it was announced that Simonović would return to Levski. He signed a two-year contract with the club. Simonović made his second debut for Levski on 15 August 2009 in a match against Minyor Pernik.

In total, Simonović appeared in more than 150 matches in the A PFG. He earned one cap for Serbia and Montenegro, playing 4 minutes in a friendly match away against Greece in December 2000.

== Honours ==
Levski Sofia
- Bulgarian League: 2002
- Bulgarian Cup: 2002, 2003, 2005
- Bulgarian Supercup: 2005
