= Asen Bukarev =

Bulgarian footballer

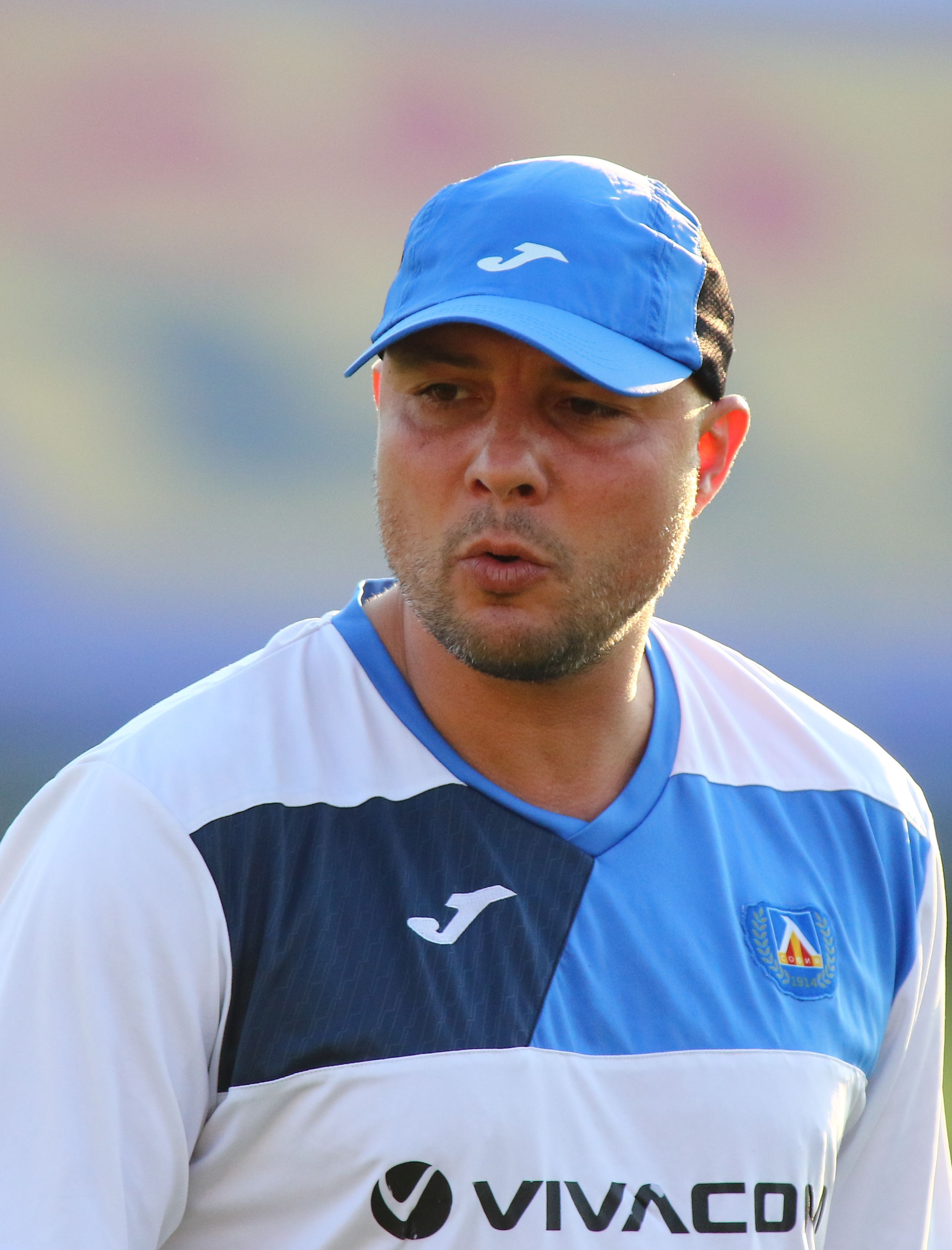

Personal information
- Full name: Asen Ivanov Bukarev
- Date of birth: 7 February 1979 (age 47)
- Place of birth: Sofia, Bulgaria
- Position: Midfielder

Youth career
- 1990–1997: CSKA Sofia

Senior career*
| Years | Team | Apps | (Gls) |
| 1997–2002 | CSKA Sofia | 127 | (17) |
| 1997–1998 | → Haskovo (loan) | 14 | (2) |
| 1998 | → Akademik Sofia (loan) | 6 | (0) |
| 2002–2003 | Cherno More | 25 | (3) |
| 2003–2006 | Levski Sofia | 48 | (4) |
| Total | | 180 | (23) |

International career
| 1998–2001 | Bulgaria U21 | 18 | (3) |
| 2001–2004 | Bulgaria | 4 | (0) |

Managerial career
- 2008: Bulgaria U21 (Assistant)
- 2009–2013: Slavia Sofia (Assistant)
- 2013: Slavia Sofia
- 2015–2017: Levski Sofia (Assistant)
- 2017–2018: Levski Sofia (Director of Football)
- 2018–2019: Levski Sofia (Assistant)
- 2019: Latvia (Assistant)
- 2020: Vitosha Bistritsa
- * Club domestic league appearances and goals

Asen Ivanov Bukarev (Bulgarian: Асен Иванов Букарев) is a Bulgarian football manager and former footballer. He is currently working as a manager of Vitosha Bistritsa.

Bukarev was honoured as Footballer of the Year of Varna for 2002.

== Career ==
=== Clubs ===
On the club level, Bukarev has played for PFC Haskovo (1997–1998), Akademik Sofia (1998), CSKA Sofia (1998–2002), Cherno More Varna (2002–2003) and Levski Sofia (2003–2006). He ended his career as a 27-year-old at the end of the 2005-2006 season, because of a serious injury from which he recovered, though the medical advice was not to risk continuing to train in accordance with the requirements for professionals.

=== International career ===
Bukarev earned his first cap with Bulgaria on 24 January 2001 in the 2:0 win against Mexico in a friendly match and made a total of 4 appearances for his country. For the Bulgaria U-21 he played in 18 matches, scoring 3 goals.

=== Coaching career ===
In June 2009 he had been appointed as an assistant coach of Velislav Vutsov in Slavia Sofia.
On 31 May 2010 Bukarev left Slavia Sofia after the departure of manager Velislav Vutsov. On 4 August 2017, following the departure of Nikolay Mitov, Asen Bukarev was appointed as caretaker manager of Levski Sofia. He moved back to assistant role on 8 August, following the appointment of Delio Rossi as manager. In late December 2019, he was appointed as manager of Vitosha Bistritsa.

== Personal ==
Bukarev's father, Ivan, and his brother, Dimitar, are both employed within the field of medicine. His mother, Lidiya, is a historian-archivist.

== Honours ==
=== CSKA Sofia ===
- Bulgarian Cup: 1998-99

=== Levski Sofia ===
- A PFG: 2005-06
- Bulgarian Cup: 2004-05
