= Richard Eromoigbe =

Nigerian footballer (born 1984)

Personal information
- Date of birth: 26 June 1984 (age 42)
- Place of birth: Lagos, Nigeria
- Height: 1.77 m (5 ft 10 in)
- Position: Midfielder

Senior career*
Years	Team	Apps	(Gls)
2002–2007	Levski Sofia	88	(2)
2002	→ Cherno More (loan)	9	(0)
2008	Khimki	8	(0)
2009–2011	Warri Wolves		
2011	Anorthosis Famagusta	6	(0)
2011	Alki Larnaca	0	(0)
2012	Beroe Stara Zagora	10	(0)

International career
2007–2008	Nigeria	6	(0)
- * Club domestic league appearances and goals

Richard Eromoigbe (born 26 June 1984) is a Nigerian former professional footballer who played as a midfielder.

== Career ==
In January 2002 Eromoigbe signed a contract with Bulgarian club Levski Sofia and joined Cherno More Varna in a year-long loan move, alongside his compatriot Emanuel Baba. He made his league debut in a 2–1 defeat at Spartak Pleven on 28 April. For the most part of his time at Cherno More, Eromoigbe was a substitute, making only eight A PFG appearances. In December 2002 he returned to Levski.

Eromoigbe made his Levski debut on 28 September 2003, in a 0–0 home draw against former club Cherno More. He became a regular fixture in the Blue team during the following 2004–05 campaign, partnering Daniel Borimirov in the centre of midfield and playing a number of important matches. Eromoigbe started in Levski's 2005 Bulgarian Cup Final win over CSKA Sofia on 25 May 2005.

In the 2005–06 season, Eromoigbe helped Levski reach the quarter-finals of the UEFA Cup. On 9 September 2006, he scored his first goal at club level in an 8–0 win over Marek Dupnitsa.

He started the 2007–08 season with Levski but on 26 February 2008 he was bought by the Russian FC Khimki. On 23 July 2008 Eromoigbe was on trial at Derby County, however Paul Jewell decided not to offer him a contract.

Eromoigbe was released by Khimki on 15 September 2009 and returned to Nigeria to play for Warri Wolves. In the transfer window of January 2011, he signed a contract with Cyprus club Anorthosis Famagusta.

Eromoigbe was out of contract with Alki Larnaca when he was signed by Beroe manager Ilian Iliev on 5 January 2012.

== Career statistics ==
Appearances and goals by club, season and competition
Club	Season	League		Cup		Continental		Total	
Club	Season	Apps	Goals	Apps	Goals	Apps	Goals	Apps	Goals
Cherno More	2001–02	5	0	0	0	–		5	0
Cherno More	2002–03	3	0	2	0	–		5	0
Cherno More	Total	8	0	2	0	0	0	10	0
Levski Sofia	2003–04	3	0	2	0	2	0	7	0
Levski Sofia	2004–05	27	0	6	0	4	0	37	0
Levski Sofia	2005–06	26	0	1	0	12	0	39	0
Levski Sofia	2006–07	24	1	5	0	10	0	39	1
Levski Sofia	2007–08	8	1	1	0	2	0	11	1
Levski Sofia	Total	88	2	15	0	30	0	133	2
Khimki	2008	8	0	0	0	–		8	0
Anorthosis Famagusta	2010–11	6	0	0	0	–		6	0
Beroe Stara Zagora	2011–12	0	0	0	0	–		0	0
Career total		110	2	17	0	30	0	157	2

== Honours ==
Levski Sofia

- Bulgarian First League: 2006, 2007
- Bulgarian Cup: 2005, 2007
- Bulgarian Supercup: 2005, 2007
