= Emil Todorov =

Bulgarian footballer

Personal information
- Full name: Emil Iliev Todorov
- Date of birth: 17 March 1975 (age 51)
- Place of birth: Burgas, Bulgaria
- Height: 1.79 m (5 ft 10 in)
- Position: Forward

Youth career
- 1985–1994: Chernomorets Burgas

Senior career*
| Years | Team | Apps | (Gls) |
| 2000–2002 | Spartak Pleven | 56 | (16) |
| 2002–2004 | Cherno More | 41 | (11) |
| 2004–2005 | Marek Dupnitsa | 26 | (7) |
| 2005 | Cherno More | 13 | (1) |
| 2006 | Beroe Stara Zagora | 3 | (0) |
| 2006–2008 | Chernomorets Burgas | 15 | (2) |
| 2008 | Nesebar | 12 | (2) |
| 2009 | Marek Dupnitsa | 2 | (2) |
| 2009–2011 | Chernomorets Balchik | 31 | (9) |
- * Club domestic league appearances and goals

Emil Todorov (Bulgarian: Емил Тодоров; born 17 March 1975) is a Bulgarian former professional footballer who played as a forward.
