= Anastas Petrov =

Bulgarian footballer and manager

Personal information
- Full name: Anastas Petrov
- Date of birth: 24 June 1973 (age 53)
- Place of birth: Pazardzhik, Bulgaria
- Position: Midfielder

Team information
- Current team: Balkan Varvara (manager)

Youth career
- 1983–1992: Hebar Pazardzhik

Senior career*
| Years | Team | Apps | (Gls) |
| 1992–1994 | Hebar Pazardzhik | 40 | (9) |
| 1995–1998 | Botev Plovdiv | 61 | (7) |
| 1998–1999 | Spartak Varna | 28 | (3) |
| 1999–2000 | Botev Plovdiv | 26 | (10) |
| 2000–2003 | Spartak Varna | 92 | (19) |
| 2004 | Naftex Burgas | 16 | (2) |
| 2004–2005 | Marek Dupnitsa | 19 | (0) |
| 2006–2007 | Botev Plovdiv | 14 | (2) |
| 2009–2011 | Lokomotiv Septemvri | 55 | (29) |
| Total | | 256 | (43) |

Managerial career
- 2009–2011: Lokomotiv Septemvri
- 2013–2016: Minyor Radnevo
- 2018–: Balkan Varvara
- * Club domestic league appearances and goals

Anastas Petrov (Bulgarian: Анастас Петров; born 24 June 1973) is a retired Bulgarian footballer and the current manager of Balkan Varvara. He was born in Pazardzhik and started his career with the local team PFC Hebar. He also turned out for PFC Botev Plovdiv (on three occasions), PFC Spartak Varna (on two occasions), PFC Naftex Burgas and PFC Marek Dupnitsa.
