= Vladimir Manolkov =

Bulgarian footballer

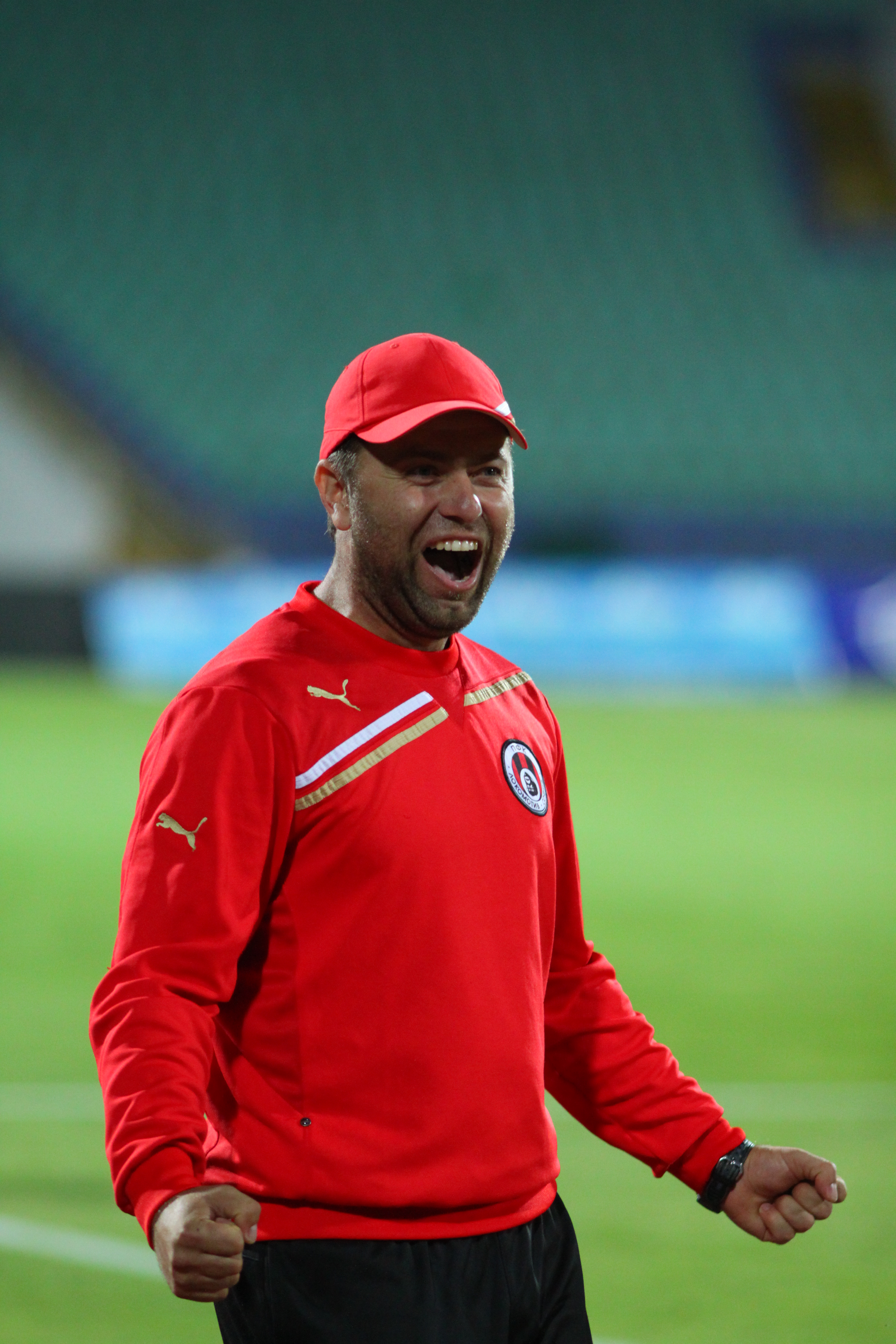

Personal information
- Date of birth: 8 December 1974 (age 51)
- Place of birth: Sofia, Bulgaria
- Height: 1.80 m (5 ft 11 in)
- Position: Goalkeeper

Youth career
- 1984–1993: Lokomotiv Sofia

Senior career*
Years	Team	Apps	(Gls)
1994–1997	Lokomotiv Sofia	26	(0)
1997–1998	Spartak Pleven	19	(0)
1998–1999	Septemvri Sofia	10	(0)
1999–2000	Belasitsa Petrich	12	(0)
2000–2010	Lokomotiv Sofia	63	(0)
Total		130	(0)

Managerial career
- Lokomotiv Sofia (Goalkeeping coach)
- 2016–2017: Beroe Stara Zagora (Goalkeeping coach)
- 2017–2019: Septemvri Sofia (Goalkeeping coach)
- * Club domestic league appearances and goals

Vladimir Manolkov (Bulgarian: Владимир Манолков; born 8 December 1974) is a Bulgarian former football goalkeeper.
