= Kostadin Bashov =

Bulgarian footballer

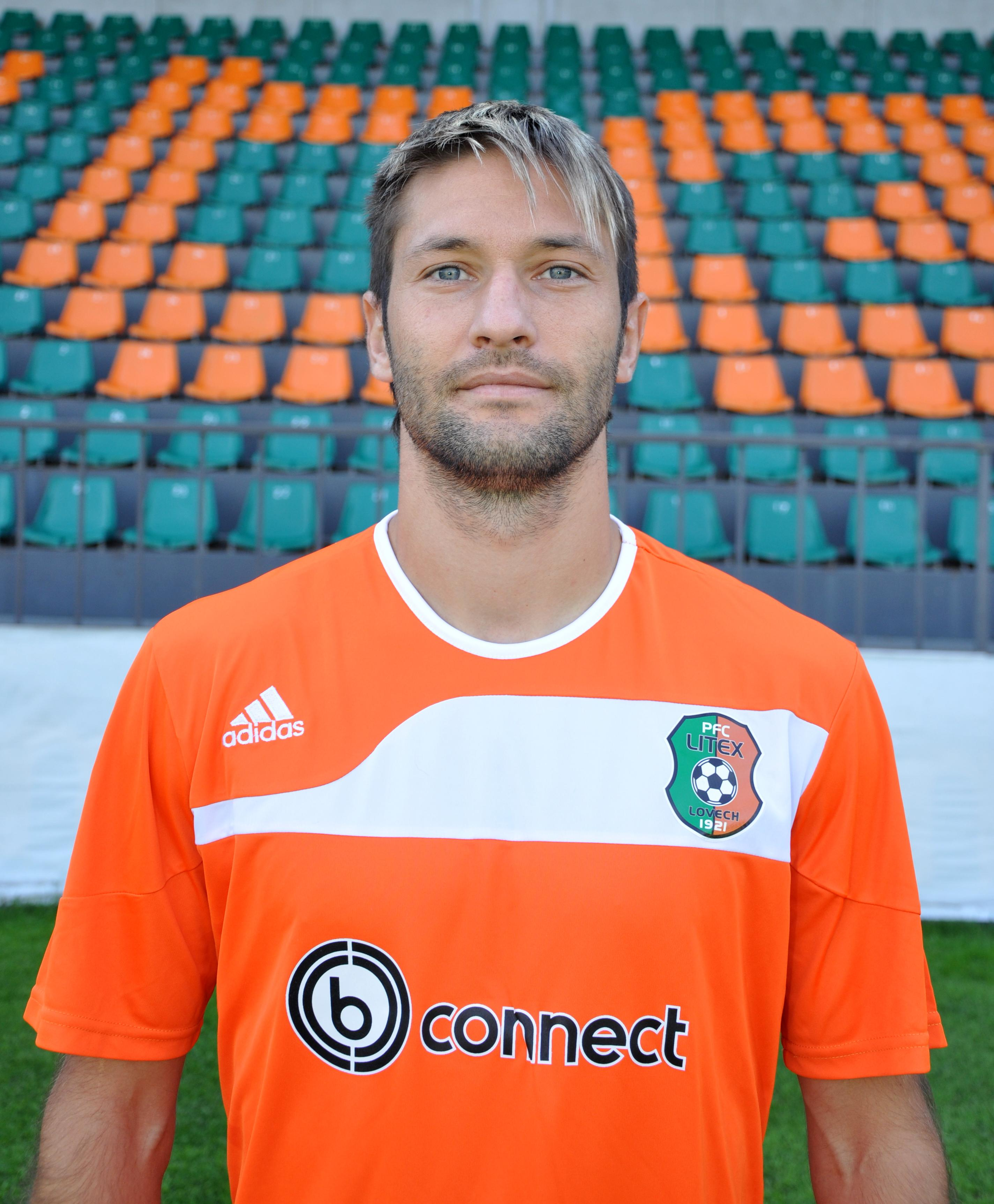

Personal information
- Full name: Kostadin Ivanov Bashov
- Date of birth: 26 November 1982 (age 43)
- Place of birth: Gotse Delchev, Bulgaria
- Height: 1.79 m (5 ft 10 in)
- Position: Forward

Team information
- Current team: Ormideia
- Number: 39

Senior career*
Years	Team	Apps	(Gls)
2001–2004	Levski Sofia	5	(0)
2001–2002	→ Spartak Pleven (loan)	25	(3)
2003	→ Cherno More (loan)	13	(1)
2004	→ Rodopa Smolyan (loan)	13	(2)
2004–2005	Vidima-Rakovski	38	(10)
2006–2007	Ethnikos Piraeus	25	(4)
2007–2008	Diagoras	29	(7)
2008	Korinthos	15	(7)
2009	Olympiakos Nicosia	10	(6)
2009–2012	Alki Larnaca	70	(19)
2012	Litex Lovech	6	(0)
2013	AEP Paphos	5	(0)
2013–2014	Pirin Gotse Delchev	27	(5)
2014–2016	Enosis Neon Paralimniou	43	(11)
2016–2017	ASIL Lysi	21	(5)
2017	P.O. Xylotymbou	11	(1)
2018	Ormideia	13	(8)

International career
2002	Bulgaria U21		
- * Club domestic league appearances and goals as of 14 February 2018

Kostadin Bashov (Bulgarian: Костадин Башов; born 26 November 1982) is a Bulgarian footballer who plays as a forward for Ormideia FC in Cypriot Third Division.

== Career ==
Bashov was born in Gotse Delchev. A product of Levski Sofia's youth academy, he progressed to their first-team in 2001. He made five appearances without scoring in his tenure at the club. He had a loan spells at Spartak Pleven, Cherno More Varna and Rodopa Smolyan. Bashov signed for Vidima-Rakovski Sevlievo at the beginning of the 2004–05 season.

In January 2006, Bashov moved to Greece where he played for Ethnikos Piraeus F.C., Diagoras F.C. and Korinthos F.C.

In January 2009, he moved to Cyprus first to play for Olympiakos Nicosia and then for Alki Larnaca.

In August 2012, after six years spent abroad, Bashov returned to the A PFG and signed a contract with Litex Lovech. He made his debut on 25 August 2012, in the 0–0 home draw with Minyor Pernik. In February 2013, after being released from Litex, Bashov agreed terms with Cypriot side AEP Paphos until the end of the season. The Cypriot club was relegated to a lower division and Bashov joined Pirin Gotse Delchev in mid September 2013.

== Honours ==
Levski Sofia

- Bulgarian Cup: 2002–03
