= Lyubomir Lubenov =

Bulgarian footballer

Lyubomir Lyubenov
Personal information
- Full name: Lyubomir Yordanov Lyubenov
- Date of birth: 25 August 1980 (age 46)
- Place of birth: Sofia, Bulgaria
- Height: 1.79 m (5 ft 10 1/2 in)
- Position: Midfielder

Team information
- Current team: Levski Chepintsi

Senior career*
Years	Team	Apps	(Gls)
1999–2001	CSKA Sofia	1	(0)
2000	→ Nesebar (loan)	15	(4)
2000	→ Spartak Pleven (loan)	11	(5)
2001–2003	Marek Dupnitsa	69	(12)
2004–2005	Levski Sofia	24	(3)
2005	Rodopa Smolyan	12	(4)
2005–2006	Litex Lovech	26	(1)
2006–2007	Naftex Burgas	25	(10)
2007–2009	Chernomorets Burgas	28	(3)
2009–2010	Arka Gdynia	31	(1)
2010–2012	Olimpia Elbląg	64	(3)
2013	Etar 1924	11	(1)
2013–2014	Pelister	14	(4)
2014–2015	PFC Burgas	25	(7)
2015	Neftochimic Burgas	14	(3)
2016	Septemvri Simitli	6	(0)
2017–	Levski Chepintsi	0	(0)
- * Club domestic league appearances and goals as of 1 June 2016

Lyubomir Lyubenov (Bulgarian: Любомир Любенов; born 25 August 1980) is a Bulgarian footballer who plays as a midfielder for Levski Chepintsi.

== Career ==
Lyubenov signed with Chernomorets in June 2007 for a free transfer from Naftex Burgas. After being released by Chernomorets, in February 2009 he signed a contract with Polish side Arka Gdynia. The midfielder/winger played for PFC Nesebar, Marek Dupnitsa, Levski Sofia, Rodopa Smolyan, Litex Lovech and Naftex Burgas.

== Honours ==
Olimpia Elbląg

- II liga East: 2010–11
