= Svetoslav Georgiev =

Bulgarian footballer (born 1977)

Personal information
- Full name: Svetoslav Miletov Georgiev
- Date of birth: 12 April 1977 (age 49)
- Place of birth: Blagoevgrad, Bulgaria
- Height: 1.85 m (6 ft 1 in)
- Position: Defender

Senior career*
Years	Team	Apps	(Gls)
1998–2000	Pirin Blagoevgrad	27	(0)
2000–2001	CSKA Sofia	2	(0)
2002	Cherno More	11	(0)
2002–2005	Makedonska slava	72	(2)
2005–2008	Marek Dupnitsa	75	(1)
2008–2010	Vihren Sandanski	13	(1)
2011–2013	Marek Dupnitsa	53	(8)
Total		253	(12)
- * Club domestic league appearances and goals

Svetoslav Miletov Georgiev (Bulgarian: Светослав Милетов Георгиев; born 12 April 1977) is a former Bulgarian football player who played as a defender.

== Career ==
Georgiev started his career at his home town Blagoevgrad in local team Pirin. After that he played for CSKA Sofia, Cherno More Varna, Makedonska slava and Marek Dupnitsa. He signed with Vihren Sandanski in July 2008 for a free transfer. On 9 August 2008 Georgiev made his official debut for Vihren in a match against Levski Sofia. On 11 November of the same year he scored his first goal for the club in a match for the Bulgarian Cup against Lyubimetz 2007.
