= Nikolay Stanchev =

Bulgarian cyclist

Personal information
- Born: 2 June 1980 (age 46)

Cycling career
- Sport: Cycling
- Discipline: Track cycling
Medal record
Men's track cycling
Representing Bulgaria

Nikolay Stanchev is a Bulgarian track cyclist. He competed for the cycling club "Sprint" – Razgrad and the Bulgarian national team.

== Biography ==
Nikolay Stanchev was born on June 2, 1980, in Razgrad, where he grew up. He began his sports career there in 1995. He graduated with a degree in Cycling from the Vassil Levski National Sports Academy (NSA) in Sofia. After his graduation, he continued to reside in the capital city.

== Sports career ==
Nikolay Stanchev has over a thirty-year history in Bulgarian cycling. Throughout the years, he has won numerous championship titles and medals from national and republican championships. His career spanned across a series of state championships, international tournaments (such as the "Sofia" Cup), and Balkan championships, competing in both team and individual disciplines.

== International and national achievements ==
- 2001 – European Track Cycling Championships in Brno (Czech Republic).
- 2002 – UCI Track Cycling World Cup in Moscow (Russia).
- 2016 – European Track Cycling Championships in France (Team Sprint discipline).
- 2016 – Balkan Track Cycling Championships in Athens (Greece) – two bronze medals:
  - Third place (bronze medal) in the 1000m time trial individual discipline.
  - Third place (bronze medal) in the Team Sprint discipline.
- 2018 – Balkan Track Cycling Championships in Plovdiv (Bulgaria):
  - Second place (silver medal and Balkan vice-championship title) in the Team Sprint discipline (alongside Miroslav Minchev and Radoslav Konstantinov).
  - Third place (bronze medal) in the Sprint individual discipline.
- 2024 – In October, at the State Championship held at the "Kolodruma" velodrome in Plovdiv, he became the national champion in the Keirin discipline during the final race of his career.
