= Todor Kyuchukov =

Bulgarian footballer

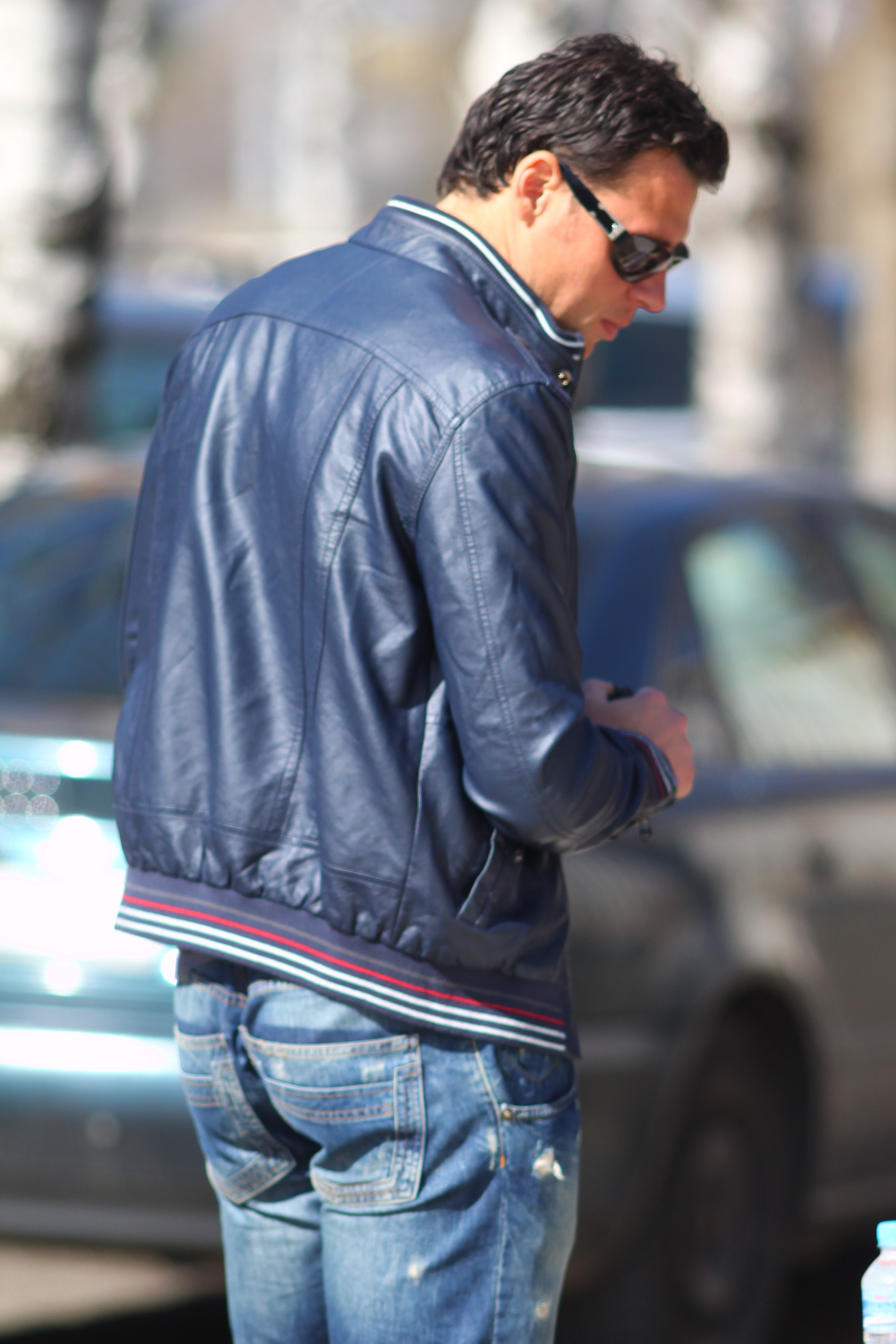

Personal information
- Full name: Todor Angelov Kyuchukov
- Date of birth: 6 September 1978 (age 48)
- Place of birth: Parvomay, Bulgaria
- Height: 1.88 m (6 ft 2 in)
- Position: Goalkeeper

Senior career*
Years	Team	Apps	(Gls)
1997–2002	CSKA Sofia	25	(0)
2000–2001	→ Marek Dupnitsa (loan)		
2002	→ Cherno More (loan)	3	(0)
2002–2003	Sigma Olomouc	0	(0)
2004	Uralan Elista		
2004	Rodopa Smolyan	2	(0)
2005	CSKA Sofia	1	(0)
2006–2007	Beira-Mar	1	(0)
2007–2008	Nea Salamina	0	(0)
2008–2009	Makedonikos	15	(0)
2009–2010	Sportist Svoge	21	(0)
2010	Kom-Minyor	8	(0)
2011	Bansko	20	(0)
2012	Bdin Vidin	10	(0)
- * Club domestic league appearances and goals

Todor Kyuchukov (Bulgarian: Тодор Кючуков; born 6 September 1978 in Parvomay) is a former Bulgarian professional footballer who played as a goalkeeper.
