= Yordan Gospodinov =

Bulgarian footballer

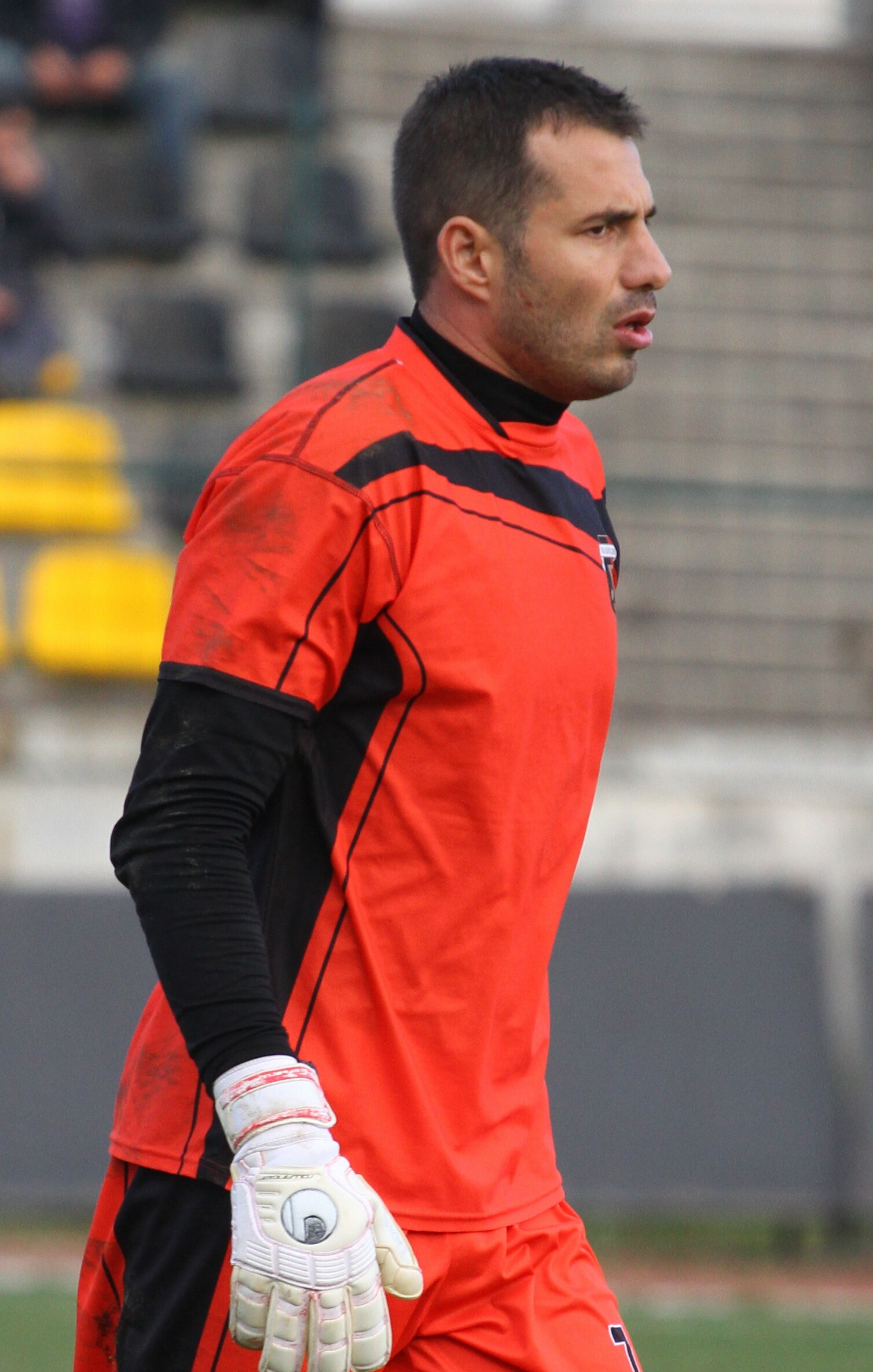

Personal information
- Full name: Yordan Gospodinov Kolev
- Date of birth: 15 June 1978 (age 48)
- Place of birth: Sliven, Bulgaria
- Height: 1.90 m (6 ft 3 in)
- Position: Goalkeeper

Youth career
- 1985–1997: Septemvri Sofia

Senior career*
Years	Team	Apps	(Gls)
1997–2004	Naftex Burgas	141	(0)
2001	→ Levski Sofia (loan)	0	(0)
2004–2007	Litex Lovech	15	(0)
2006	→ Panserraikos (loan)	13	(0)
2007–2010	Slavia Sofia	44	(0)
2010	→ Lokomotiv Mezdra (loan)	9	(0)
2010–2011	Kaliakra Kavarna	22	(0)
2011–2012	Concordia Chiajna	12	(0)
2012–2015	Lokomotiv Plovdiv	72	(0)
2015	Neftochimic Burgas	10	(0)

International career
1999–2002	Bulgaria	4	(0)

Managerial career
- 2016–2018: Lokomotiv Sofia (goalkeeping coach)
- 2018–2019: Tsarsko Selo (goalkeeping coach)
- 2019–2021: Beroe (goalkeeping coach)
- 2021–2023: Lokomotiv Sofia (goalkeeping coach)
- 2023: Botev Plovdiv (goalkeeping coach)
- 2024: Levski Sofia (goalkeeping coach)
- * Club domestic league appearances and goals

Yordan Gospodinov (Bulgarian: Йордан Господинов; born 15 June 1978) is a former Bulgarian footballer who played as a goalkeeper.

He had previously played for Neftochimic Burgas, Litex Lovech, Slavia Sofia, Greek Panserraikos FC, Kaliakra Kavarna, Romanian Concordia Chiajna and Lokomotiv Plovdiv.
