= Aleksey Dionisiev =

Bulgarian-born Uzbekistani footballer

Personal information
- Full name: Aleksey Yordanov Dionisiev
- Date of birth: 21 April 1973 (age 53)
- Place of birth: Vidin, Bulgaria
- Height: 1.84 m (6 ft 1/2 in)
- Position: Defender

Senior career*
Years	Team	Apps	(Gls)
1992–1993	Bdin Vidin	18	(1)
1994–1996	Volov Shumen	84	(8)
1997	Bdin Vidin	14	(3)
1997–1998	Maritsa Plovdiv	35	(3)
1999–2002	Levski Sofia	30	(2)
2001–2002	→ Cherno More (loan)	30	(1)
2002–2003	Cherno More	7	(0)
2003–2004	Rodopa Smolyan	17	(0)
2004–2005	Thyella Patras	24	(0)
2005	Ptolemaida-Lignitorikhi	19	(2)
2006	Rodopa Smolyan	15	(0)
2006	Thyella Patras	9	(0)
2007	Vihren Sandanski	4	(0)

International career
2001	Uzbekistan	5	(1)
- * Club domestic league appearances and goals

Aleksey Dionisiev (Bulgarian: Алексей Дионисиев; born 21 April 1973) is a former Bulgarian-born Uzbekistani footballer who played as a defender.

== International career ==
Born in Bulgaria, Dionisiev was one of several foreign-born players to represent the Uzbekistan national football team in 2002 FIFA World Cup qualifying. He scored on his debut, a 7–0 victory against Taiwan on 23 April 2001.

In 2001 Dionisiev received an Uzbek passport together with his compatriot Georgi Georgiev and made five appearances for the Uzbekistan national football team.

=== International goals ===
Scores and results list Uzbekistan's goal tally first.

No	Date	Venue	Opponent	Score	Result	Competition
1.	23 April 2001	Pakhtakor Markaziy Stadium, Tashkent, Uzbekistan	Chinese Taipei	2–0	7–0	2002 FIFA World Cup qualification

== Personal life ==
In 2007 Dionisiev married long-time girlfriend Zhenya Georgieva.

== Awards ==
- Champion of Bulgaria – 2 times – 2000, 2001 (with Levski Sofia)
- (Bulgaria) Bulgarian Cup – 1 time – 2000 (with Levski Sofia)
