= Marian Gospodinov =

Bulgarian footballer

Personal information
- Full name: Marian Dimov Gospodinov
- Date of birth: 6 July 1974 (age 52)
- Place of birth: Kazanlak, Bulgaria
- Height: 1.84 m (6 ft 0 in)
- Position: Defender

Senior career*
Years	Team	Apps	(Gls)
1999–2001	Lokomotiv Sofia		
2001–2002	Beroe Stara Zagora	21	(1)
2002–2004	Ergotelis	53	(2)
2004–2005	Kalamata	24	(0)
2005–2007	Ilisiakos	45	(0)
2007–2008	Aiolikos	28	(1)
2008–2009	Korinthos		
- * Club domestic league appearances and goals

Marian Gospodinov (born 6 July 1974) is a Bulgarian former football player who last played for Korinthos.
