= Georgi Chilikov =

Bulgarian footballer (born 1978)

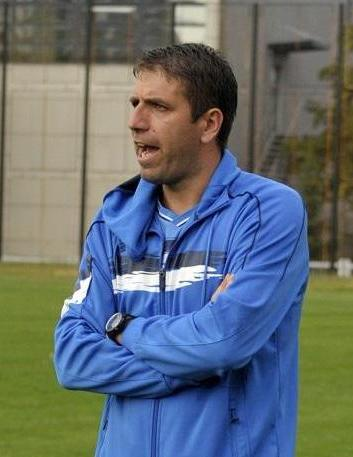
- Chilikov with Levski Sofia in 2016

Personal information
- Full name: Georgi Prodanov Chilikov
- Date of birth: 23 August 1978 (age 48)
- Place of birth: Burgas, Bulgaria
- Height: 1.94 m (6 ft 4 in)
- Position: Forward

Team information
- Current team: Dunav Ruse (manager)

Senior career*
Years	Team	Apps	(Gls)
1995–1998	Chernomorets Burgas	56	(29)
1999–2001	Naftex Burgas	56	(8)
2001–2005	Levski Sofia	97	(55)
2005–2007	CD Nacional	39	(4)
2007	CSKA Sofia	12	(3)
2008	Dalian Shide	12	(5)
2009	FC Tobol	9	(1)
2009	Chernomorets Burgas	6	(0)
2010	Lokomotiv Plovdiv	2	(0)
Total		289	(105)

International career
2002–2004	Bulgaria	7	(1)

Managerial career
- 2010: Neftochimic 1986 (assistant)
- 2011–2014: Chernomorets Burgas (assistant)
- 2014: Botev Plovdiv (scout)
- 2014: Botev Plovdiv (assistant)
- 2016: Levski Sofia U17
- 2016–2017: Levski Sofia (head scout)
- 2017: Oborishte
- 2017–2018: Ludogorets Razgrad (assistant)
- 2019–2021: Beroe (assistant)
- 2021: Arda Kardzhali
- 2022–2023: Spartak Varna (assistant)
- 2023–2024: Sportist Svoge
- 2024–2026: Dunav Ruse
- 2026–: Dunav Ruse
- * Club domestic league appearances and goals

Georgi Chilikov (Bulgarian: Георги Чиликов; born 23 August 1978) is a Bulgarian football manager and former player.

He was part of the Bulgarian 2004 European Football Championship team, which exited in the first round, finishing bottom of Group C, having finished top of Qualifying Group 8 in the pre-tournament phase. Chilikov scored his only goal for the national side in the 2:1 home win against Andorra on 16 October 2002 in a Euro 2004 qualifier.

== Club career ==
Born in Burgas, Chilikov was educated in Chernomorets Burgas' youth academy. From 1999 to 2001 he played for the other club from Burgas – Naftex. His move from Naftex to Levski Sofia made him the record holder of the highest transfer between Bulgarian clubs. In June 2001, Levski Sofia signed Chilikov to a four-year deal for a record €1.25 million. During his time with the "blues", Chilikov established himself as a dependable goal-scorer. On 24 April 2004, he netted a last-minute goal against archrivals CSKA Sofia in an A PFG match to help his team to a 2–1 away win. On 28 August 2002, Chilikov failed to convert a penalty in a 1–0 loss against Ukrainian side Dynamo Kyiv in a third qualifying round Champions League match. In 2005, he moved to Portugal, joining Nacional Madeira. In June 2007, Chilikov was loaned out to CSKA Sofia for one year and 50 000 euros price. Despite some reservations on the part of the CSKA supporters (due to the time he had spent at Levski Sofia), Chilikov quickly managed to win them over. On 11 August 2007, he netted an equalizing goal in an A PFG match against Litex Lovech. On 30 August 2007, Chilikov scored a last-minute goal against Cypriot side AC Omonia in a UEFA Cup game and helped his team advance to the next stage. However, despite generally impressing in his substitute appearances, Chilikov failed to establish himself as part of the starting 11. In January 2008, he was transferred to Chinese club Dalian Shide. After that he had brief stints with FC Tobol, Chernomorets Burgas and Lokomotiv Plovdiv.

== International career ==
Between 2002 and 2004, Chilikov earned seven caps for Bulgaria, scoring one goal.

== Style of play ==
Chilikov was known for his powerful heading ability.

== Coaching career ==
From July to September 2010 he served as assistant manager in Neftochimic Burgas. Chilikov was assistant manager in Chernomorets Burgas from June 2011 to May 2014. In July 2016, Chilikov was assigned as coach of PFC Levski (Sofia) U17 youth academy team. Between October 2016–June 2017 he was the Head Scout of Levski Sofia and was in charge of the team's selection.

On 9 June 2017, Chilikov was appointed as manager of Second League club Oborishte Panagyurishte. In August 2017, only after a month in charge of Oborishte, Chilikov was appointed as an assistant manager of Ludogorets Razgrad. In September 2021, Chilikov became the head coach of Arda Kardzhali. He parted ways with the Kardzhali team in November 2021.

Champion with FC Dunav Ruse Second league Bulgaria season 2025/2026 . |FC Dunav Ruse

== Career statistics ==
Scores and results list Bulgaria's goal tally first.

#	Date	Venue	Opponent	Score	Result	Competition
1	16 October 2002	Vasil Levski National Stadium, Sofia, Bulgaria	Andorra	1 – 0	2–1	Euro 2004 qualifier

== Honours ==
Levski Sofia

- Bulgarian League: 2002
- Bulgarian Cup: 2002, 2003, 2005
- A PFG Top goalscorer: 2003 (22 goals)
