= Stefan Donchev =

Bulgarian footballer

Personal information
- Date of birth: 28 August 1975 (age 51)
- Place of birth: Varna, Bulgaria
- Height: 1.77 m (5 ft 10 in)
- Position: Left back

Youth career
- Spartak Varna

Senior career*
Years	Team	Apps	(Gls)
1997–1999	Dorostol Silistra		
1999–2000	Ludogorets	7	(0)
2000–2003	Spartak Varna	62	(2)
2004–2005	Levski Sofia	5	(0)
2005	Atyrau		
2005–2008	Lokomotiv Sofia	25	(2)
2008–2010	Spartak Varna	23	(1)
2010–2011	Dorostol Silistra	30	(0)
- * Club domestic league appearances and goals

Stefan Donchev (Bulgarian: Стефан Дончев; born 28 August 1975 in Varna) is a former Bulgarian footballer who played as a defender.

== Career statistics ==
As of 23 December 2010

Club	Season	League		Cup		Europe		Total	
Club	Season	Apps	Goals	Apps	Goals	Apps	Goals	Apps	Goals
Ludogorets	1999–00	7	0	0	0	–	–	7	0
Spartak Varna	2000–01	14	1	2	0	–	–	16	1
Spartak Varna	2001–02	21	1	0	0	–	–	21	1
Spartak Varna	2002–03	13	0	3	0	–	–	16	0
Spartak Varna	2003–04	14	0	1	0	–	–	15	0
Levski Sofia	2003–04	5	0	0	0	–	–	5	0
Levski Sofia	2004–05	0	0	1	0	–	–	1	0
Atyrau	2005	?	?	?	?	–	–	?	?
Lokomotiv Sofia	2005–06	10	0	1	0	–	–	11	0
Lokomotiv Sofia	2006–07	12	2	2	0	2	0	16	2
Lokomotiv Sofia	2007–08	3	0	2	0	–	–	5	0
Spartak Varna	2008–09	13	0	0	0	–	–	13	0
Spartak Varna	2009–10	10	1	0	0	–	–	10	1
Dorostol Silistra	2010–11	15	0	0	0	–	–	15	0
Career totals		137	5	12	0	2	0	151	5
