= Kristiyan Dobrev =

Bulgarian footballer

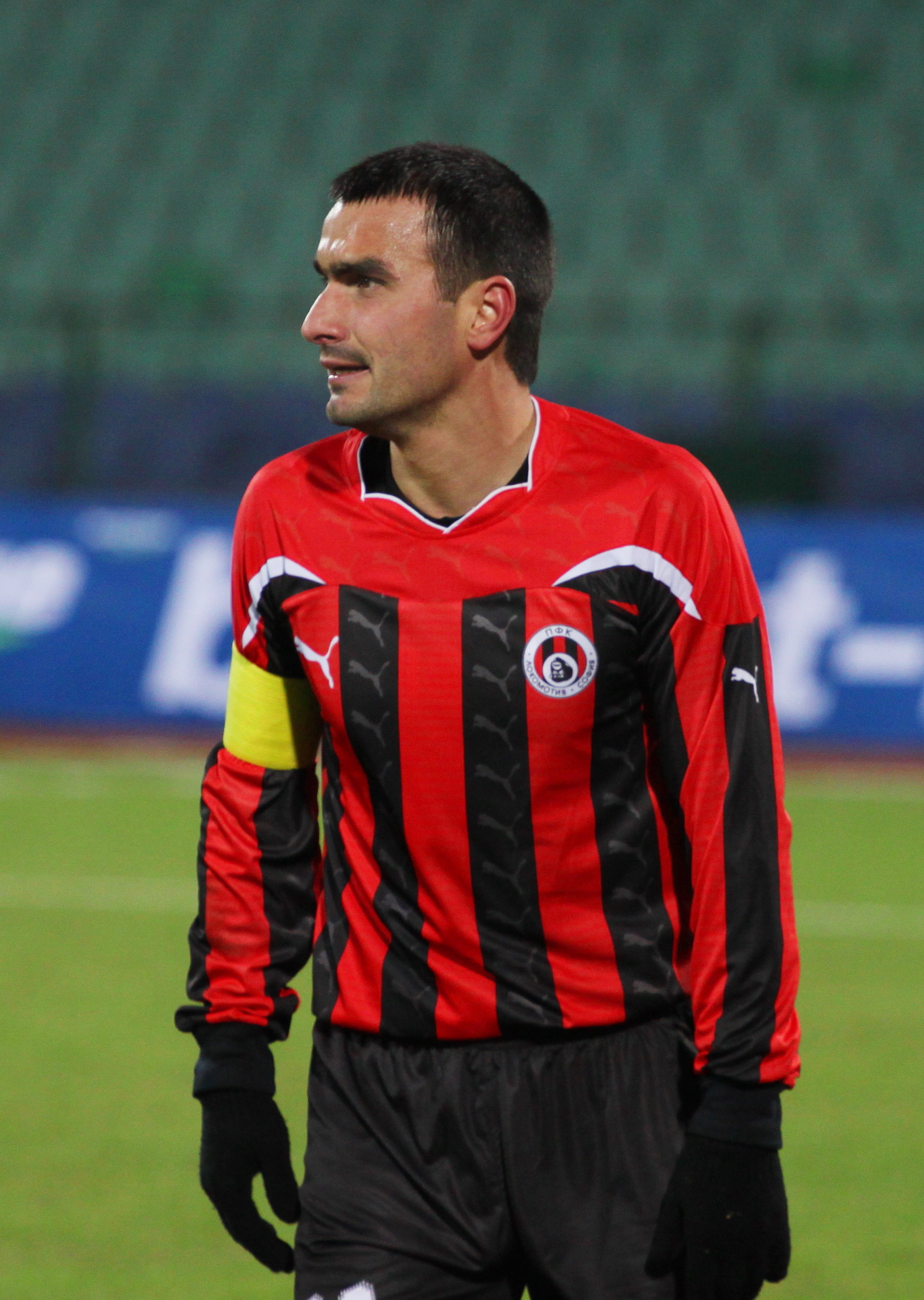

Personal information
- Full name: Kristiyan Stefanov Dobrev
- Date of birth: 23 September 1978 (age 48)
- Place of birth: Sofia, Bulgaria
- Height: 1.74 m (5 ft 9 in)
- Position: Left back

Team information
- Current team: Septemvri Sofia (sporting director)

Senior career*
Years	Team	Apps	(Gls)
1996–1998	Lokomotiv Sofia	19	(5)
1998	Metalurg Pernik	6	(0)
1999	Nеftochimic Burgas	8	(0)
1999–2000	Dobrudzha Dobrich	23	(3)
2000–2003	Cherno More	54	(10)
2003–2013	Lokomotiv Sofia	218	(17)
2007	→ Lech Poznań (loan)	8	(0)
Total		336	(35)

Managerial career
- 2013–2015: Lokomotiv Sofia (assistant)
- * Club domestic league appearances and goals

Kristiyan Stefanov Dobrev (Bulgarian: Кристиян Стефанов Добрев; born 23 September 1978) is a Bulgarian former professional footballer who is currently the sporting director of Septemvri Sofia.

== Career ==
Dobrev was raised in Lokomotiv Sofia's youth teams. Between 1998 and 2003, he played for Naftex Burgas, Dobrudzha Dobrich, and Cherno More Varna. In June 2003, he returned to Lokomotiv Sofia. He was sent on loan to Lech Poznań in January 2007 until the end of the 2006–07 season.

== Career statistics ==
As of 12 June 2013

Club	Season	League		Cup		Europe		Total	
Club	Season	Apps	Goals	Apps	Goals	Apps	Goals	Apps	Goals
Lokomotiv Sofia	1996–97	10	4	0	0	—		10	4
Lokomotiv Sofia	1997–98	9	1	0	0	—		9	1
Metalurg Pernik	1998–99	6	0	0	0	—		6	0
Neftochimic Burgas	1998–99	8	0	0	0	—		8	0
Dobrudzha Dobrich	1999–2000	23	3	2	2	—		25	5
Cherno More	2000–01	18	0	2	0	—		20	0
Cherno More	2001–02	33	10	0	0	—		33	10
Cherno More	2002–03	3	0	2	1	—		5	1
Lokomotiv Sofia	2003–04	25	2	8	1	—		33	3
Lokomotiv Sofia	2004–05	26	5	2	0	—		28	5
Lokomotiv Sofia	2005–06	15	1	0	0	—		15	1
Lokomotiv Sofia	2006–07	14	2	2	0	6	1	22	3
Lokomotiv Sofia	2007–08	22	2	1	0	4	0	27	2
Lokomotiv Sofia	2008–09	21	0	1	0	2	0	24	0
Lokomotiv Sofia	2009–10	23	1	2	0	—		25	1
Lokomotiv Sofia	2010–11	26	1	1	0	—		27	1
Lokomotiv Sofia	2011–12	29	2	0	0	2	0	31	2
Lokomotiv Sofia	2012–13	17	1	3	0	0	0	20	1
Lech Poznań (loan)	2006–07	8	0	1	0	—		9	0
Career total		336	35	27	4	14	1	377	40
