= Omonigho Temile =

Nigerian footballer

Personal information
- Date of birth: 16 July 1984 (age 42)
- Place of birth: Delta, Nigeria
- Height: 1.78 m (5 ft 10 in)
- Position: Winger

Youth career
- Delta United

Senior career*
Years	Team	Apps	(Gls)
2002	Cherno More Varna	31	(3)
2003–2004	Levski Sofia	32	(7)
2004–2006	Krylia Sovetov Samara	24	(0)
2008–2009	Botev Plovdiv	11	(1)
2009–2010	Warri Wolves		
2010–2011	Valletta	21	(1)
Total		119	(12)

International career
2001	Nigeria U17	6	(2)
- * Club domestic league appearances and goals

Omonigho Temile (16 July 1984) is a Nigerian former professional footballer who played as a winger.

== Club career ==
Born in Lagos, Nigeria, Temile began his playing career at Nigerian football club Delta United from Warri. He started his professional career playing for Bulgarian side Cherno More in 2002. He signed for Levski Sofia in February 2003, teaming up with fellow Nigerians Garba Lawal and Justice Christopher. He made his debut on 28 February, against Marek. He was a runner-up for the Best Young Player award of 2003–04 season. Temile scored once for Levski in UEFA Cup.

In 2004, Temile went for trials with Ukrainian club Dynamo Kyiv in the summer, but eventually joined Russian Premier League side Krylia Sovetov Samara. He signed a four-and-a-half-year contract. He joined Warri Wolves in 2009 and signed in August 2010 for Maltese club side Valletta.

== International career ==
Temile was a member of Nigeria's U-17 squad that finished second in the 2001 FIFA U-17 World Championship held in Trinidad and Tobago. He started all six games, and scored twice from his midfield position. Temile scored the last goal against Japan on a penalty kick in the 91st minute, in which Nigeria won 4–0. He was also on target in the 5–1 defeat of Australia in the quarter final. Nigeria eventually lost the final against France.

== Personal life ==
Temile is the nephew of Clement Temile, cousin of Toto Tamuz, elder brother of Frank Temile.

== Honours ==
Levski Sofia

- Bulgarian Cup: 2002–03
