= Vladimir Gerasimov (footballer, born 1975) =

Russian footballer and coach (born 1975)

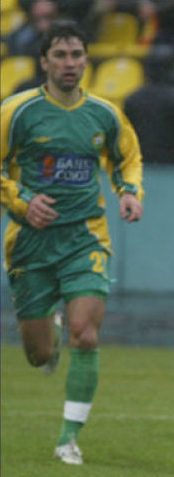
- Gerasimov in 2005

Personal information
- Full name: Vladimir Vladimirovich Gerasimov
- Date of birth: 22 March 1975 (age 51)
- Place of birth: Krasnoarmeysk, Russian SFSR
- Height: 1.79 m (5 ft 10 1/2 in)
- Positions: Defender; midfielder

Team information
- Current team: FC Sakhalin Yuzhno-Sakhalinsk (asst manager)

Senior career*
Years	Team	Apps	(Gls)
1994–1996	Mashinostroitel Sergiyev Posad	111	(19)
1997–1999	Sportakademklub Moscow	91	(7)
2000	Krylia Sovetov	1	(0)
2000	Arsenal Tula	17	(0)
2001	Krylia Sovetov	0	(0)
2001–2003	Cherno More	51	(3)
2003–2004	Levski Sofia	10	(0)
2004–2006	Kuban Krasnodar	64	(5)

Managerial career
- 2009: FC Okean Nakhodka
- 2017–: FC Sakhalin Yuzhno-Sakhalinsk (assistant)
- * Club domestic league appearances and goals

Vladimir Vladimirovich Gerasimov (Russian: Владимир Владимирович Герасимов; born 22 March 1975) is a Russian professional football coach and a former player. He is an assistant coach with FC Sakhalin Yuzhno-Sakhalinsk.

== Playing career ==
As a player, he made his debut in the Russian Third Division in 1994 for FC Mashinostroitel Sergiyev Posad.
