= Steliyan Popchev =

Bulgarian footballer

Personal information
- Date of birth: 8 April 1976 (age 50)
- Place of birth: Stara Zagora, Bulgaria
- Height: 1.87 m (6 ft 1 1/2 in)
- Position: Defender

Senior career*
Years	Team	Apps	(Gls)
1995–1999	Olimpik Teteven		
1999–2001	Beroe Stara Zagora	38	(1)
2002	Cherno More		
2002–2005	Beroe Stara Zagora		
2005–2006	Minyor Radnevo	23	(0)
2006	Dunav Ruse	14	(1)
2007	Minyor Radnevo	27	(0)
2008–2009	Lokomotiv StZ	24	(4)
2009–2010	Beroe Stara Zagora	2	(0)
- * Club domestic league appearances and goals

Steliyan Popchev (Bulgarian: Стелиян Попчев) (born 8 April 1976 in Stara Zagora) is a Bulgarian former footballer who played as a defender.

He has served as administrator at Beroe after previously being employed as administrative director. In August 2025, he was appointed as regional chairman of the Bulgarian Football Union for Stara Zagora.

Popchev's career is mainly associated with Beroe but he also represented Olympik Teteven, Cherno More, Lokomotiv Stara Zagora and Minyor Radnevo.
