= Stanislav Rumenov =

Bulgarian footballer

Personal information
- Full name: Stanislav Angelov Rumenov
- Date of birth: 11 February 1980 (age 46)
- Place of birth: Sofia, Bulgaria
- Height: 1.75 m (5 ft 9 in)
- Positions: Winger; forward

Youth career
- CSKA Sofia

Senior career*
Years	Team	Apps	(Gls)
1999–2001	CSKA Sofia	3	(0)
2001	→ Marek Dupnitsa (loan)	–	(–)
2001	→ Pirin Blagoevgrad (loan)	–	(–)
2002–2003	Cherno More	22	(5)
2003–2005	Marek Dupnitsa	27	(4)
2005–2007	Lokomotiv Sofia	25	(4)
2007–2010	Minyor Pernik	50	(12)
2010	Torpedo Borovan	12	(1)
2011	Vitosha Bistritsa	7	(0)
- * Club domestic league appearances and goals

Stanislav Rumenov (Bulgarian: Станислав Руменов; born 11 February 1980) is a Bulgarian former footballer who played as a forward.
