= Slavi Zhekov =

Bulgarian footballer

Personal information
- Full name: Slavi Slavov Zhekov
- Date of birth: 21 August 1976 (age 50)
- Place of birth: Stara Zagora, Bulgaria
- Height: 1.75 m (5 ft 9 in)
- Position: Midfielder

Team information
- Current team: Beroe Stara Zagora (assistant)

Senior career*
Years	Team	Apps	(Gls)
1994–1996	Beroe Stara Zagora	10	(0)
1996–1998	Olimpic Teteven	?	(?)
1998–2001	Chernomorets Burgas	62	(8)
2001	Beroe Stara Zagora	14	(1)
2002–2003	Cherno More	36	(3)
2003–2005	Beroe Stara Zagora	43	(4)
2005–2007	Cherno More	49	(8)
2007–2008	Lokomotiv StZ	?	(?)
2008–2012	Beroe Stara Zagora	67	(6)
2012–2014	Vereya Stara Zagora	?	(?)
- * Club domestic league appearances and goals

Slavi Zhekov (Bulgarian: Слави Жеков; born 21 August 1976) is a former Bulgarian footballer who played as a midfielder.

== Honours ==
=== Club ===
- Cherno More
  - Bulgarian Cup:
    - Runner-up: 2005-06
- Beroe
  - Bulgarian Cup:
    - Winner: 2009-10
