= Emmanuel Baba =

Nigerian footballer (born 1985)

Personal information
- Date of birth: 22 May 1985 (age 41)
- Place of birth: Nigeria
- Height: 1.80 m (5 ft 11 in)
- Position: Defender

Youth career
- Jigawa Golden Stars

Senior career*
Years	Team	Apps	(Gls)
2002	Cherno More	17	(0)
2003–2004	Levski Sofia	3	(0)
2005	Al-Salmiya		
2006–2008	Spartak Varna	5	(0)
2008–2009	Smouha		

International career
2001	Nigeria U17	6	(0)
- * Club domestic league appearances and goals

Emmanuel Baba (born 22 May 1985) is a Nigerian former professional footballer who played as a defender.

== Career ==
In 2002, Baba played for Cherno More Varna. In 2003 moved to Levski Sofia. In 2007, he played for PFC Spartak Varna.

He played with the Nigeria under-17 national team in the 2001 FIFA U-17 World Championship and won the bronze medal.

== Honours ==
Nigeria U17

- FIFA U-17 World Championship bronze medal: 2001
