= 2004–05 PFC Cherno More Varna season =

Cherno More
2004–05 season
- Chairman: Krasen Kralev
- Manager: Ilian Iliev
- A Group: 8th
- Bulgarian Cup: Second round (knocked out by Lokomotiv Sofia)
- Top goalscorer: Plamen Timnev (11)
- Biggest win: 4–1 (vs Vidima-Rakovski, 14 Mar 2004)
- Biggest defeat: 8–1 (vs Lokomotiv Plovdiv, 24 Apr 2004)
Home colours	Away colours

This page covers all relevant details regarding PFC Cherno More Varna for all official competitions inside the 2004–05 season. These are A Group and Bulgarian Cup.

== Transfers ==
=== Summer transfer window ===
In:

No.	Pos.	Nation	Player
3	DF	BUL	Detelin Dimitrov (from Dobrudzha)
4	MF	BUL	Yordan Terziev (from (Greece) Doxa Drama)
5	DF	BUL	Veselin Vachev (from Levski Sofia)
7	FW	BUL	Todor Simov (from Levski Sofia)
10	MF	BUL	Konstantin Mirchev (from CSKA Sofia)
11	FW	BUL	Plamen Timnev (from Naftex Burgas)
14	MF	SCG	Vladan Milosavljević (from (Serbia and Montenegro) FK Zemun)
17	MF	SCG	Marko Ilić (from (Serbia and Montenegro) OFK Beograd)
19	MF	BUL	Dimitar Georgiev (from Spartak Varna)
21	MF	BUL	Kuncho Kunchev (from Spartak Pleven)
23	FW	BUL	Nikolay Valev (from Spartak Varna)
29	MF	GEO	Konstantine Darsania (from (Georgia (country)) Sioni Bolnisi)

Out:

No.	Pos.	Nation	Player
1	GK	BUL	Tihomir Todorov (released)
3	DF	BUL	Stefan Goshev (released)
5	DF	SCG	Miroslav Milošević (to (Cyprus) Alki Larnaca)
7	FW	BUL	Emil Todorov (to Marek)
8	MF	BUL	Stanislav Genchev (loan return to Levski Sofia)
11	MF	BUL	Ilian Iliev (retired)
13	MF	BUL	Rosen Emilov (to Marek)
14	DF	BUL	Kenan Kyazimov (to Lokomotiv GO)
17	DF	BUL	Mariyan Germanov (to Marek)
19	MF	BUL	Martin Zafirov (released)
21	FW	BUL	Rumen Shankulov (to (Israel) Hapoel Rishon LeZion)
23	DF	GEO	Levan Shavgulidze (to (Georgia (country)) Zestafoni)
25	MF	BUL	Ivo Klekov (to Akademik Sofia)
30	MF	GHA	Emanuel Bentil (released)

=== Winter transfer window ===
In:

No.	Pos.	Nation	Player

Out:

No.	Pos.	Nation	Player
23	FW	BUL	Nikolay Valev (to Svetkavitsa)

== Squad and league statistics ==
Goalkeepers
1	(Bulgaria) Zhivko Gerasimov	0	(0)
22	(Bulgaria) Ivaylo Petrov	24	(0)
33	(Bulgaria) Krasimir Kolev	5	(0)

Defenders
2	(Bulgaria) Danail Bachkov	20	(0)
3	(Bulgaria) Detelin Dimitrov	17	(0)
5	(Bulgaria) Veselin Vachev	21	(1)
6	(Bulgaria) Gosho Ginchev	26	(3)
15	(Georgia (country)) Vladimir Kakashvili	14	(0)
20	(Bulgaria) Stanislav Stoyanov	24	(0)
25	(Bulgaria) Georgi Georgiev	6	(0)

Midfielders
4	(Bulgaria) Yordan Terziev	21	(1)
8	(Bulgaria) Diyan Genchev	23	(1)
10	(Bulgaria) Konstantin Mirchev	17	(0)
13	(Bulgaria) Stefan Kikov	1	(0)
14	(Serbia and Montenegro) Vladan Milosavljević	3	(0)
16	(Bulgaria) Ivan Georgiev	12	(1)
17	(Serbia and Montenegro) Marko Ilić	21	(2)
18	(Bulgaria) Petar Kostadinov	27	(1)
19	(Bulgaria) Dimitar Georgiev	21	(1)
21	(Bulgaria) Kuncho Kunchev	28	(0)
28	(Bulgaria) Nikolay Stankov	7	(0)
29	(Georgia (country)) Konstantine Darsania	14	(3)

Forwards
7	(Bulgaria) Todor Simov	24	(3)
9	(Bulgaria) Valentin Stanchev	14	(1)
11	(Bulgaria) Plamen Timnev	23	(11)
23	(Bulgaria) Nikolay Valev	3	(0)

Manager
(Bulgaria) Ilian Iliev

== Matches ==
=== A Group ===
7 August 2004 Round 1	Vidima-Rakovski	2 – 1	Cherno More	Sevlievo
18:00 EEST	Kakalov 26'; Radulov 29'; Raychev (yellow card); Ashimov (yellow card)	report	Timnev 13'; Terziev (yellow card); Timnev (yellow card)	Stadium: Rakovski; Attendance: 2,500

15 August 2004 Round 2	Cherno More	1 – 3	Litex Lovech	Varna
18:00 EEST	Terziev 84'; Ginchev (yellow card); Mirchev (yellow card)	report	Trică 20'; Rusev 44'; Joãozinho 77'; N. Dimitrov (yellow card); Yovov (yellow card); Trică (yellow card)	Stadium: Ticha; Attendance: 5,000

21 August 2004 Round 3	Marek Dupnitsa	2 – 1	Cherno More	Dupnitsa
18:00 EEST	Pargov 27'; Y. Kyuchukov 60' (pen.); A. Kyuchukov (yellow card)	report	Timnev 7'; Terziev (yellow card); Kunchev (yellow card); V. Stanchev (yellow card); Kakashvili (yellow card)	Stadium: Bonchuk; Attendance: 3,000

28 August 2004 Round 4	Cherno More	3 – 0	Belasitsa Petrich	Varna
18:00 EEST	D. Georgiev 6'; Ginchev 62' (pen.); Timnev 90' (pen.); P. Kostadinov (yellow card); Terziev (yellow card)	report	A. Kostadinov (yellow card); Panayotov (yellow card); Deyanov (yellow card); Paparkov (yellow card) (yellow-red card)	Stadium: Ticha; Attendance: 1,000

11 September 2004 Round 5	Pirin Blagoevgrad	3 – 0	Cherno More	Blagoevgrad
17:00 EEST	K. Markov 9'; Zlatinov 14'; Kosturkov 52'; Stoychev (yellow card); Velkov (yellow card); Kosturkov (yellow card)	report	Ginchev (yellow card); Stoyanov (yellow card); D. Genchev (yellow card)	Stadium: Hristo Botev; Attendance: 4,500

18 September 2004 Round 6	Cherno More	2 – 0	Lokomotiv Plovdiv	Varna
17:00 EEST	Timnev 47'; Simov 80'; D. Dimitrov (yellow card); Kostadinov (yellow card); D. Genchev (yellow card); Stoyanov (yellow card)	report	Morales (yellow card); Kr. Dimitrov (yellow card) (yellow-red card)	Stadium: Ticha; Attendance: 2,500

25 September 2004 Round 7	Rodopa Smolyan	2 – 3	Cherno More	Smolyan
17:00 EEST	Petev 4'; Redovski 74'		Timnev 49'; Ilić 80'; D. Genchev 89'	Stadium: Septemvri; Attendance: 3,500

3 October 2004 Round 8	Cherno More	1 – 2	CSKA Sofia	Varna
15:00 EEST	Simov 76'; Kostadinov (yellow card); Stoyanov (yellow card)	report	Sakaliev 40'; Y. Todorov 50'; Y. Todorov (yellow card); Yanev (yellow card)	Stadium: Ticha; Attendance: 6,000; Referee: Galin Moskalev (Yambol)

16 October 2004 Round 9	Nesebar	1 – 1	Cherno More	Nesebar
16:00 EEST	Pav. Kolev 48'; Yonov (yellow card)	report	Darsania 50'; Milosavljević (yellow card)	Stadium: Nesebar; Attendance: 1,000

23 October 2004 Round 10	Cherno More	2 – 0	Naftex Burgas	Varna
16:00 EEST	Timnev 48'; Ilić 64'; Stoyanov (yellow card); Terziev (yellow card)	report	Simeonov (yellow card); Krastev (yellow card); Daniel Hristov (yellow card); Bornosuzov (yellow card); Deyan Hristov (yellow card)	Stadium: Ticha; Attendance: 1,000

30 October 2004 Round 11	Spartak Varna	1 – 0	Cherno More	Varna
14:30 EEST	Radomirov 83'; Mihaylov (yellow card); Filatov (yellow card); N. Stanchev (yellow card)	report	D. Genchev (yellow card); Stoyanov (yellow card); Timnev (yellow card) (yellow-red card)	Stadium: Spartak; Attendance: 4,000

6 November 2004 Round 12	Cherno More	1 – 0	Beroe Stara Zagora	Varna
14:30 EEST	V. Stanchev 68'; Terziev (yellow card); Ilić (yellow card)	report	K. Ivanov (yellow card); Popchev (yellow card); Mitev (yellow card); Zdr. Todorov (yellow card)	Stadium: Ticha; Attendance: 2,000

14 November 2004 Round 13	Lokomotiv Sofia	2 – 1	Cherno More	Sofia
14:30 EEST	Kr. Dobrev 3' (pen.); Orachev 78'; D. Donchev (yellow card); Kr. Dobrev (yellow card); Genkov (yellow card); Atanasov (yellow card)	report	Timnev 74'; D. Genchev (yellow card); Timnev (yellow card); Kostadinov (yellow card)	Stadium: Lokomotiv; Attendance: 300

21 November 2004 Round 14	Slavia Sofia	3 – 1	Cherno More	Sofia
14:30 EEST	Vladimirov 45+2'; Valkanov 78', 90+1'; Valkanov (yellow card); Karaslavov (yellow card); Bl. Georgiev (yellow card); Vladimirov (yellow card)	report	Y. Petkov 84' (o.g.); Timnev (yellow card); Valev (yellow card); Ginchev (yellow card) (yellow-red card)	Stadium: Slavia; Attendance: 500

27 November 2004 Round 15	Cherno More	0 – 0	Levski Sofia	Varna
14:30 EEST	Terziev (yellow card); Stoyanov (yellow card); Kakashvili (yellow card); D. Genchev (yellow card) (yellow-red card)	report	St. Angelov (yellow card); E. Angelov (yellow card); Borimirov (yellow card)	Stadium: Ticha; Attendance: 6,000; Referee: Momchil Vraykov (Pleven)

26 February 2005 Round 16	Cherno More	1 – 0	Vidima-Rakovski	Varna
14:00 EEST	Vachev 17'; Kostadinov (yellow card); Timnev (yellow card); Ilić (yellow card); Vachev (yellow card) (yellow-red card)	report	Gospodinov (yellow card); Zelenkov (yellow card)	Stadium: Ticha; Attendance: 2,000

5 March 2005 Round 17	Litex Lovech	2 – 0	Cherno More	Lovech
15:00 EEST	Kushev 19'; Isailović 88'; Dzhambazov (yellow card)	report	Terziev (yellow card); Ilić (yellow card); V. Stanchev (yellow card)	Stadium: Lovech; Attendance: 2,000

12 March 2005 Round 18	Cherno More	3 – 2	Marek Dupnitsa	Varna
15:00 EEST	Kostadinov 33'; Simov 55'; Timnev 61'; Timnev (yellow card); Kostadinov (yellow card); Terziev (yellow card)	report	T. Kolev 59'; Y. Kyuchukov 89'; Emilov (yellow card); Stankov (yellow card) (yellow-red card)	Stadium: Ticha; Attendance: 1,200

19 March 2005 Round 19	Belasitsa Petrich	0 – 0	Cherno More	Petrich
15:00 EEST	St. Nenov (yellow card); Paparkov (yellow card); A. Kostadinov (yellow card); Sht. Dimitrov (yellow card)	report	Stoyanov (yellow card); Kakashvili (yellow card); Kunchev (yellow card); D. Georgiev (yellow card); I. Georgiev (yellow card)	Stadium: Tsar Samuil; Attendance: 500

2 April 2005 Round 20	Cherno More	1 – 1	Pirin Blagoevgrad	Varna
17:00 EEST	I. Georgiev 46'		Zlatinov 65' (pen.)	Stadium: Ticha; Attendance: 1,000; Referee: Momchil Vraykov (Pleven)

6 April 2005 Round 21	Lokomotiv Plovdiv	2 – 0	Cherno More	Plovdiv
17:00 EEST	Paskov 5'; Kamburov 10'; Kotev (yellow card)	report	Ginchev (yellow card); Mirchev (yellow card)	Stadium: Lokomotiv; Attendance: 2,000

10 April 2005 Round 22	Cherno More	1 – 0	Rodopa Smolyan	Varna
17:00 EEST	Darsania 10'			Stadium: Ticha; Attendance: 1,500

17 April 2005 Round 23	CSKA Sofia	1 – 0	Cherno More	Sofia
17:00 EEST	Yanev 63' (pen.)	report	Kakashvili (yellow card)	Stadium: Balgarska Armia; Attendance: 3,000

23 April 2005 Round 24	Cherno More	2 – 1	Nesebar	Varna
15:00 EEST	Darsania 49'; Timnev 66' (pen.); Darsania (yellow card); Vachev (yellow card); Stoyanov (yellow card); Ilić (yellow card); Simov (yellow card)	report	Ilchev 23' (pen.); Linkov (yellow card); Nyagolov (yellow card); Stoilov (yellow card) (yellow-red card)	Stadium: Ticha; Attendance: 1,500

30 April 2005 Round 25	Naftex Burgas	2 – 1	Cherno More	Burgas
20:00 EEST	Sakaliev 30', 56'; Sarmov (yellow card); K. Yanev (yellow card); Mitrev (yellow card)	report	Ginchev 90+3' (pen.); Vachev (yellow card)	Stadium: Lazur; Attendance: 300

6 May 2005 Round 26	Cherno More	1 – 0	Spartak Varna	Varna
18:00 EEST	Timnev 63' (pen.); Darsania (yellow card)	report	N. Stanchev (yellow card); Hasan (yellow card)	Stadium: Ticha; Attendance: 4,500

11 May 2005 Round 27	Beroe Stara Zagora	2 – 0	Cherno More	Stara Zagora
18:00 EEST	Moke 74', 83'; Zhekov (yellow card)	report	Stoyanov (yellow card)	Stadium: Beroe; Attendance: 2,500

15 May 2005 Round 28	Cherno More	0 – 1	Lokomotiv Sofia	Varna
18:00 EEST	Stoyanov (yellow card); Kunchev (yellow card)	report	Hr. Markov 45'; Trenkov (yellow card); D. Donchev (yellow card); Y. Petkov (yellow card)	Stadium: Ticha; Attendance: 1,000

21 May 2005 Round 29	Cherno More	1 – 1	Slavia Sofia	Varna
18:00 EEST	Ginchev 56' (pen.); Mirchev (yellow card); Terziev (yellow card)	report	Karaslavov 18'; Valkanov (yellow card); Mechedzhiev (yellow card)	Stadium: Ticha; Attendance: 1,000

28 May 2005 Round 30	Levski Sofia	2 – 1	Cherno More	Sofia
17:30 EEST	M. Ivanov 9', 22'; M. Ivanov (yellow card)	report	Timnev 11'; Ilić (yellow card); Kostadinov (yellow card)	Stadium: Georgi Asparuhov; Attendance: 2,000; Referee: Ivan Babanov (Sandanski)

==== League table ====
Pos	Team	Pld	W	D	L	GF	GA	GD	Pts
6	Lokomotiv Sofia (Note: Lokomotiv Sofia were docked three points for failure to pay salaries to a former player.)	30	14	7	9	43	35	+8	46
7	Naftex Burgas	30	10	5	15	24	38	−14	35 (Note: Naftex Burgas ahead of Cherno More, Marek and Beroe on head-to-head points; Naftex Burgas: 10 pts, Cherno More: 9 pts, Marek: 9 pts, Beroe: 7 pts.)
8	Cherno More	30	10	5	15	30	38	−8	35
9	Marek	30	9	8	13	34	44	−10	35
10	Beroe	30	9	8	13	32	36	−4	35

Source: A PFG (in Bulgarian)
Rules for classification: 1st points; 2nd head-to-head points; 3rd head-to-head goal difference; 4th head-to-head goals scored; 5th head-to-head away goals scored; 6th goal difference; 7th goals scored; 8th "sportsmanship" (R & Y cards); 9th draw

==== Results summary ====
Overall								Home						Away					
Pld	W	D	L	GF	GA	GD	Pts	W	D	L	GF	GA	GD	W	D	L	GF	GA	GD
30	10	5	15	30	38	−8	35	9	3	3	20	11	+9	1	2	12	10	27	−17

==== League performance ====
Round	1	2	3	4	5	6	7	8	9	10	11	12	13	14	15	16	17	18	19	20	21	22	23	24	25	26	27	28	29	30
Ground	A	H	A	H	A	H	A	H	A	H	A	H	A	A	H	H	A	H	A	H	A	H	A	H	A	H	A	A	H	A
Result	L	L	L	W	L	W	W	L	D	W	L	W	L	L	D	W	L	W	D	D	L	W	L	W	L	W	L	L	D	L
Position	10	13	15	12	14	11	7	8	8	7	7	6	7	8	8	6	7	6	6	7	7	6	7	7	7	7	7	7	7	8

A = Away; H = Home; W = Win; D = Draw; L = Loss

==== Goalscorers in A Group ====
Rank	Scorer	Goals
1	(Bulgaria) Plamen Timnev	11
2	(Bulgaria) Todor Simov	3
2	(Georgia (country)) Konstantine Darsania	3
2	(Bulgaria) Gosho Ginchev	3
5	(Serbia and Montenegro) Marko Ilić	2
6	(Bulgaria) Yordan Terziev	1
6	(Bulgaria) Dimitar Georgiev	1
6	(Bulgaria) Diyan Genchev	1
6	(Bulgaria) Valentin Stanchev	1
6	(Bulgaria) Veselin Vachev	1
6	(Bulgaria) Petar Kostadinov	1
6	(Bulgaria) Ivan Georgiev	1

=== Bulgarian cup ===
26 October 2004 2nd Round	Cherno More	3 – 4 (a.e.t.)	Lokomotiv Sofia	Varna
15:00 EET	Valev 35', 75'; Simov 78'		Atanasov 10'; Stoyanov 36'; Genkov 51'; Kondev 101'	Stadium: Ticha; Attendance: 1,000
