= 2006–07 PFC Cherno More Varna season =

Cherno More
2006–07 season
- Chairman: Krasen Kralev
- Manager: Yasen Petrov
- A Group: 6th
- Bulgarian Cup: Third round (knocked out by Vihren)
- Top goalscorer: Masena Moke (6)
- Biggest win: 0–6 (vs Chernomorets, 15 Sep 2006)
- Biggest defeat: 5–0 (vs Levski, 5 May 2007)
Home colours	Away colours

This page covers all relevant details regarding PFC Cherno More Varna for all official competitions inside the 2006–07 season. These are A Group and Bulgarian Cup.

== Transfers ==
=== Summer transfer window ===
In:

No.	Pos.	Nation	Player
—	GK	BUL	Yordan Linkov (from Vihren)
—	DF	BUL	Kiril Dzhorov (from Rodopa)
—	DF	BUL	Aleksandar Tomash (from (Ukraine) Metalurh Zaporizhya)
—	DF	BUL	Radoslav Bachev (from Marek)
—	MF	BUL	Boyko Velichkov (from (Greece) Ilisiakos)
—	FW	BUL	Georgi Andonov (from Botev Plovdiv)

Out:

No.	Pos.	Nation	Player
—	GK	BUL	Ivaylo Petrov (to CSKA Sofia)
—	DF	BUL	Atanas Pashkulev (to Septemvri Sofia)
—	DF	GNB	Adelino Lopes (to Beroe)
—	MF	POR	André Marqueiro (to Vidima-Rakovski)
—	MF	GNB	Adilson Cassamá (loan return to (Portugal) União da Madeira)
—	FW	BUL	Todor Simov (to Beroe)

=== Winter transfer window ===
In:

No.	Pos.	Nation	Player
—	MF	BUL	Daniel Georgiev (from CSKA Sofia)
—	MF	BUL	Todor Palankov (on loan from Litex)
—	MF	POR	Paulo Dias (from (Portugal) Olivais e Moscavide)
—	FW	BUL	Miroslav Manolov (from CSKA Sofia)

Out:

No.	Pos.	Nation	Player
—	DF	BUL	Yanko Kosturkov (to Marek)
—	MF	BUL	Daniel Morales (to CSKA Sofia)
—	MF	GNB	Inzaghi Donígio (loan return to (Portugal) Benfica)

== Squad and league statistics ==
Goalkeepers
1	(Bulgaria) Karamfil Ilchev	4	(0)
33	(Bulgaria) Krasimir Kolev	24	(0)
77	(Bulgaria) Yordan Linkov	2	(0)

Defenders
3	(Bulgaria) Daniel Gramatikov	0	(0)
5	(Bulgaria) Veselin Vachev	16	(1)
6	(Bulgaria) Kiril Dzhorov	29	(1)
7	(Bulgaria) Stanislav Stoyanov	13	(0)
15	(Bulgaria) Aleksandar Aleksandrov	26	(0)
23	(Serbia) Miroslav Milošević	11	(0)
24	(Bulgaria) Radoslav Bachev	25	(0)
26	(Bulgaria) Aleksandar Tomash	22	(1)
	(Bulgaria) Yanko Kosturkov*	1	(0)

Midfielders
2	(Bulgaria) Daniel Dimov	4	(0)
4	(Brazil) Daniel Morales*	11	(2)
8	(Bulgaria) Martin Hristov	15	(3)
10	(Bulgaria) Konstantin Mirchev	18	(3)
13	(Bulgaria) Diyan Genchev	17	(1)
14	(Bulgaria) Slavi Zhekov	24	(5)
16	(Bulgaria) Todor Palankov	12	(0)
18	(Bulgaria) Petar Kostadinov	24	(0)
27	(Portugal) Paulo Dias	5	(0)
29	(Bulgaria) Vladko Kostadinov	4	(0)
30	(Bulgaria) Daniel Georgiev	9	(0)
32	(Bulgaria) Boyko Velichkov	5	(1)
	(Guinea-Bissau) Inzaghi Donígio*	8	(1)

Forwards
9	(Bulgaria) Miroslav Manolov	11	(0)
11	(Bulgaria) Georgi Andonov	21	(1)
19	(Democratic Republic of the Congo) Masena Moke	19	(6)
21	(Bulgaria) Georgi Vladimirov	18	(3)
28	(Brazil) Marcos da Silva	18	(5)

Manager
(Bulgaria) Yasen Petrov

- Kosturkov, Inzaghi and Morales left the club during a season.

== Matches ==
=== A Group ===
4 August 2006 Round 1	Cherno More	0–2	CSKA Sofia	Varna
18:00 EEST	Velichkov (yellow card); Moke (yellow card) (yellow-red card)	report	G. Iliev 16'; Tunchev 29'; Y. Todorov (yellow card); T. Silva (yellow card); V. Dimitrov (yellow card)	Stadium: Ticha; Attendance: 11,000; Referee: Tsvetan Georgiev (Sofia)

12 August 2006 Round 2	Slavia Sofia	0–0	Cherno More	Sofia
18:00 EEST	Stoykov (yellow card); N. Petrov (red card) 54'	report	Dzhorov (yellow card); Vachev (yellow card); Bachev (yellow card); Vladimirov (yellow card) (yellow-red card)	Stadium: Slavia; Attendance: 500

19 August 2006 Round 3	Cherno More	4–0	Botev Plovdiv	Varna
18:00 EEST	D. Genchev 45'; M. Hristov 55'; Morales 75'; Velichkov 83'; Mirchev (yellow card)	report	Kakalov (yellow card); An. Petrov (yellow card)	Stadium: Ticha; Attendance: 2,500

26 August 2006 Round 4	Beroe Stara Zagora	2–1	Cherno More	Stara Zagora
18:00 EEST	Simov 52'; M. Lopes 79'; Harizanov (yellow card); Zakov (yellow card); Kovachev (yellow card) (yellow-red card)	report	Zhekov 6'; Morales (yellow card); Zhekov (yellow card); Vladimirov (yellow card); Moke (yellow card); M. Hristov (yellow card)	Stadium: Beroe; Attendance: 2,500

9 September 2006 Round 5	Cherno More	2–3	Lokomotiv Sofia	Varna
17:00 EEST	M. Hristov 41'; Vachev 51'; Morales (yellow card); Milošević (yellow card); Dzhorov (yellow card); Vladimirov (yellow card); P. Kostadinov (yellow card); Bachev (yellow card); Moke (yellow card) (yellow-red card)	report	Dafchev 30'; Genkov 66', 79'; Donchev (yellow card) (yellow-red card)	Stadium: Ticha; Attendance: 5,000

15 September 2006 Round 6	Chernomorets Burgas Sofia	0–6	Cherno More	Sofia
17:00 EEST	Yordanov (yellow card); Bombov (yellow card); Raev (yellow card); Stepanov (yellow card) (yellow-red card)	report	Tomash 36'; M. Hristov 58'; Zhekov 64'; Bombov 70' (o.g.); Vladimirov 77'; Dzhorov 82'; Mirchev (yellow card)	Stadium: Vasil Levski; Attendance: 80

24 September 2006 Round 7	Cherno More	1–2	Vihren Sandanski	Varna
17:00 EEST	Moke 42' (pen.); R. Bachev (yellow card); Vladimirov (yellow card)	report	Gospodinov 16'; Georgievski 44'; Sheytanov (yellow card); Hristozov (yellow card); Serginho (yellow card); G. Bachev (yellow card); Cvetković (yellow card)	Stadium: Ticha; Attendance: 3,500

30 September 2006 Round 8	Marek Dupnitsa	0–1	Cherno More	Dupnitsa
16:00 EEST	Krastovchev (yellow card); A. Kyuchukov (yellow card); Kalchev (yellow card)	report	Mirchev 82'; Dzhorov (yellow card); Zhekov (yellow card)	Stadium: Bonchuk; Attendance: 1,500

15 October 2006 Round 9	Cherno More	2–1	Rodopa Smolyan	Varna
16:00 EEST	Moke 24' (pen.); Inzaghi 57'	report	Peev 90+2'	Stadium: Ticha; Attendance: 2,500; Referee: Stanislav Todorov (Shumen)

23 October 2006 Round 10	Belasitsa Petrich	1–0	Cherno More	Petrich
16:00 EEST	Du Bala 73'; Lichkov (yellow card); Dinkov (yellow card)	report	Bachev (yellow card); Vachev (yellow card); Andonov (yellow card); D. Genchev (yellow card); Moke (yellow card)	Stadium: Tsar Samuil

27 October 2006 Round 11	Cherno More	1–1	Levski Sofia	Varna
15:00 EEST	Moke 65'; Morales (yellow card); Dzhorov (yellow card); Zhekov (yellow card)	report	Domovchiyski 15'; Topuzakov (yellow card); Tomašić (yellow card)	Stadium: Ticha; Attendance: 10,000; Referee: Nikolay Yordanov (Sofia)

4 November 2006 Round 12	Cherno More	1–0	Lokomotiv Plovdiv	Varna
14:00 EEST	Andonov 6'; Vachev (yellow card); Morales (yellow card); P. Kostadinov (yellow card); Genchev (yellow card)	report	Alex (yellow card); Vandev (yellow card); Halimi (yellow card); Goranov (yellow card); Miliev (yellow card) (yellow-red card)	Stadium: Ticha; Attendance: 2,500

11 November 2006 Round 13	Litex Lovech	0–0	Cherno More	Lovech
14:30 EEST	Manolev (yellow card); Berberović (red card) 90+2'	report	Aleksandrov (yellow card); P. Kostadinov (yellow card); Genchev (yellow card)	Stadium: Lovech; Attendance: 300

18 November 2006 Round 14	Cherno More	3–0	Spartak Varna	Varna
14:30 EEST	M. Da Silva 39'; Moke 54' (pen.); Zhekov 81'; Zhekov (yellow card)	report	Peykov (yellow card); Arangelov (yellow card); Radomirov (yellow card); Filipov (yellow card); B. Georgiev (yellow card) (yellow-red card); Nenov (red card) 57'	Stadium: Ticha; Attendance: 10,000

25 November 2006 Round 15	Rilski Sportist	1–2	Cherno More	Samokov
14:30 EEST	Gemedzhiev 90+3' (pen.); Krumov (yellow card); Gemedzhiev (yellow card)	report	M. Da Silva 21'; Mirchev 74'; Bachev (yellow card); Zhekov (yellow card); Stoyanov (yellow card)	Stadium: Iskar; Attendance: 1,500

4 March 2007 Round 16	CSKA Sofia	0–0	Cherno More	Sofia
15:00 EEST	V. Dimitrov (yellow card)	report	Dzhorov (yellow card); Stoyanov (yellow card); Bachev (yellow card); D. Georgiev (yellow card); Dias (yellow card)	Stadium: Balgarska Armia; Attendance: 5,000; Referee: Angel Angelov (Sofia)

10 March 2007 Round 17	Cherno More	0–1	Slavia Sofia	Varna
15:30 EEST	Kr. Kolev (yellow card); Dzhorov (yellow card); Dias (yellow card); M. Da Silva (yellow card)	report	Aleksandrov 43' (o.g.); E. Petrov (yellow card); Vl. Ivanov (yellow card); Mechedzhiev (yellow card); T. Kolev (yellow card); Kyumurdzhiev (yellow card); Kerchev (yellow card)	Stadium: Ticha; Attendance: 4,500

17 March 2007 Round 18	Botev Plovdiv	2–0	Cherno More	Plovdiv
15:30 EEST	Garov 75'; Alegre 84'; Bozhkov (yellow card); Vargov (yellow card)	report	Bachev (yellow card); Dias (yellow card)	Stadium: Hristo Botev; Attendance: 5,000

22 March 2007 Round 19	Cherno More	1–0	Beroe Stara Zagora	Varna
15:30 EEST	M. Da Silva 34'; Manolov (yellow card); Genchev (yellow card) (yellow-red card)	report	M. Lopes (yellow card); Zdr. Todorov (yellow card); Atanasov (yellow card)	Stadium: Ticha; Attendance: 3,000

1 April 2007 Round 20	Lokomotiv Sofia	2–0	Cherno More	Sofia
15:30 EEST	Antunović 29'; Genkov 34'; G. Markov (yellow card); Varbanov (yellow card)	report	Tomash (yellow card); M. Da Silva (yellow card); Manolov (yellow card)	Stadium: Lokomotiv; Attendance: 2,500

6 April 2007 Round 21	Cherno More	3–1	Chernomorets Burgas Sofia	Varna
14:30 EEST	M. Da Silva 1'; Moke 30', 47'		Dyankov 48'	Stadium: Ticha; Attendance: 2,000

14 April 2007 Round 22	Vihren Sandanski	0–2	Cherno More	Sandanski
17:00 EEST	V. Georgiev (yellow card); R. Ivanov (yellow card)	report	Zhekov 59'; M. Da Silva 70'; Dzhorov (yellow card); Genchev (yellow card); Manolov (yellow card)	Stadium: Sandanski; Attendance: 1,000

19 April 2007 Round 23	Cherno More	1–0	Marek Dupnitsa	Varna
17:00 EEST	Mirchev 69'; Mirchev (yellow card)	report	Sv. Georgiev (yellow card); R. Ivanov (yellow card); D. Georgiev (yellow card)	Stadium: Ticha; Attendance: 3,000

22 April 2007 Round 24	Rodopa Smolyan	0–0	Cherno More	Smolyan
17:00 EEST				Stadium: Septemvri; Attendance: 100

29 April 2007 Round 25	Cherno More	1–0	Belasitsa Petrich	Varna
17:00 EEST	Lichkov 7' (o.g.); Vachev (yellow card); Moke (yellow card); M. Da Silva (yellow card)	report	Lichkov (yellow card); A. Kostadinov (yellow card); G. Petrov (yellow card); Dinkov (yellow card)	Stadium: Ticha; Attendance: 1,500

5 May 2007 Round 26	Levski Sofia	5–0	Cherno More	Sofia
19:00 EEST	Yovov 7', 88'; Domovchiyski 20'; Telkiyski 52' (pen.), 66'; M. Ivanov (yellow card)	report	Zhekov (yellow card); Stoyanov (yellow card)	Stadium: Georgi Asparuhov; Attendance: 6,300; Referee: Tsvetan Georgiev (Sofia)

12 May 2007 Round 27	Lokomotiv Plovdiv	2–0	Cherno More	Plovdiv
18:00 EEST	Baldovaliev 54', 83'; Yoshev (yellow card); Kr. Dimitrov (yellow card); Miliev (yellow card) (yellow-red card)	report	Bachev (yellow card); Vladimirov (yellow card); M. Da Silva (yellow card) (yellow-red card)	Stadium: Lokomotiv; Attendance: 900

16 May 2007 Round 28	Cherno More	1–0	Litex Lovech	Varna
17:30 EEST	Zhekov 34'; Stoyanov (yellow card); Mirchev (yellow card); Dimov (yellow card); Zhekov (yellow card)	report	Bibishkov (yellow card)	Stadium: Ticha; Attendance: 2,500

19 May 2007 Round 29	Spartak Varna	2–0	Cherno More	Varna
16:30 EEST	Deniran 37'; D. Todorov 68'; Đukić (yellow card); D. Todorov (yellow card); Stoev (yellow card); Kunchev (yellow card) (yellow-red card)	report	Mirchev (yellow card); Stoyanov (yellow card); Bachev (yellow card) (yellow-red card)	Stadium: Spartak; Attendance: 3,500

27 May 2007 Round 30	Cherno More	2–1	Rilski Sportist	Varna
17:30 EEST	Vladimirov 72', 80'; Tomash (yellow card); M. Hristov (yellow card); Dzhorov (red card) 74'	report	St. Kostadinov 49'; Gyulemetov (yellow card)	Stadium: Ticha; Attendance: 1,000

==== League table ====
Pos	Team	Pld	W	D	L	GF	GA	GD	Pts	Qualification or relegation
4	Litex Lovech	30	19	5	6	65	29	+36	62	Qualification for UEFA Cup first qualifying round
5	Slavia Sofia	30	14	7	9	47	75	−28	49	
6	Cherno More	30	14	5	11	35	29	+6	47	Qualification for Intertoto Cup second round
7	Lokomotiv Plovdiv	30	13	4	13	48	43	+5	43	
8	Belasitsa Petrich	30	11	5	14	38	43	−5	38	

Source: A PFG (in Bulgarian)
Rules for classification: 1st points; 2nd head-to-head points; 3rd head-to-head goal difference; 4th head-to-head goals scored; 5th head-to-head away goals scored; 6th goal difference; 7th goals scored; 8th "sportsmanship" (R & Y cards); 9th draw

==== Results summary ====
Overall								Home						Away					
Pld	W	D	L	GF	GA	GD	Pts	W	D	L	GF	GA	GD	W	D	L	GF	GA	GD
30	14	5	11	35	29	+6	47	10	1	4	23	12	+11	4	4	7	12	17	−5

==== League performance ====
Round	1	2	3	4	5	6	7	8	9	10	11	12	13	14	15	16	17	18	19	20	21	22	23	24	25	26	27	28	29	30
Ground	H	A	H	A	H	A	H	A	H	A	H	H	A	H	A	A	H	A	H	A	H	A	H	A	H	A	A	H	A	H
Result	L	D	W	L	L	W	L	W	W	L	D	W	D	W	W	D	L	L	W	L	W	W	W	D	W	L	L	W	L	W
Position	14	12	7	9	13	9	12	9	6	7	9	5	7	5	5	6	6	7	6	7	6	6	5	5	5	5	6	5	6	6

A = Away; H = Home; W = Win; D = Draw; L = Loss

==== Goalscorers in A Group ====
Rank	Scorer	Goals
1	(Democratic Republic of the Congo) Masena Moke	6
2	(Bulgaria) Slavi Zhekov	5
2	(Brazil) Marcos da Silva	5
4	(Bulgaria) Martin Hristov	3
4	(Bulgaria) Georgi Vladimirov	3
4	(Bulgaria) Konstantin Mirchev	3
7	(Bulgaria) Diyan Genchev	1
7	(Brazil) Daniel Morales	1
7	(Bulgaria) Boyko Velichkov	1
7	(Bulgaria) Veselin Vachev	1
7	(Bulgaria) Aleksandar Tomash	1
7	(Bulgaria) Kiril Dzhorov	1
7	(Bulgaria) Georgi Andonov	1
7	(Guinea-Bissau) Inzaghi Donígio	1

=== Bulgarian Cup ===
7 November 2006 2nd Round	Cherno More	1–0	Rodopa Smolyan	Varna
	M. Da Silva 41'	report		Stadium: Ticha; Attendance: 500

30 November 2006 3rd Round	Vihren Sandanski	0 – 0 (a.e.t.) (4–3 p)	Cherno More	Sandanski
				Stadium: Sandanski
