= 2003–04 PFC Cherno More Varna season =

Cherno More
2003–04 season
- Chairman: Krasen Kralev
- Manager: Velislav Vutsov
- A Group: 6th
- Bulgarian Cup: Third round (knocked out by Rodopa)
- Top goalscorer: Emil Todorov (10)
- Biggest win: 4–1 (vs Vidima-Rakovski, 14 Mar 2004)
- Biggest defeat: 8–1 (vs Lokomotiv Plovdiv, 24 Apr 2004)
Home colours	Away colours

This page covers all relevant details regarding PFC Cherno More Varna for all official competitions inside the 2003–04 season. These are A Group and Bulgarian Cup.

== Transfers ==
=== Summer transfer window ===
In:

No.	Pos.	Nation	Player
—	GK	BUL	Krasimir Kolev (from Spartak Varna)
—	DF	BUL	Danail Bachkov (from Levski Sofia)
—	DF	GEO	Vladimir Kakashvili (from (Georgia (country)) Locomotive Tbilisi)
—	DF	GEO	Levan Shavgulidze (from (Georgia (country)) Locomotive Tbilisi)
—	MF	BUL	Ivo Klekov (from Valeks Tryavna)
—	MF	GHA	Emanuel Bentil (from (Russia) Alania)
—	MF	BUL	Petar Kostadinov (from Chernomorets Burgas)
—	MF	BUL	Stanislav Genchev (on loan from Levski Sofia)
—	MF	BUL	Diyan Genchev (from (Greece) Kalamata)
—	MF	BUL	Ilian Iliev (from (Portugal) Salgueiros)
—	MF	BUL	Ivan Georgiev (from Chernomorets Burgas)
—	MF	BUL	Martin Zafirov (from Lokomotiv Plovdiv)
—	FW	BUL	Rumen Shankulov (from Marek)

Out:

No.	Pos.	Nation	Player
—	GK	BUL	Todor Todorov (released)
—	DF	UZB	Aleksey Dionisiev (to Rodopa Smolyan)
—	DF	BUL	Adalbert Zafirov (to (Cyprus) Anagennisi Deryneia)
—	DF	BRA	Lúcio Wagner (loan return to Levski Sofia)
—	DF	BIH	Dalibor Dragić (to (Austria) SV Mattersburg)
—	DF	BUL	Diyan Donchev (loan return to Spartak Varna)
—	MF	BUL	Slavi Zhekov (to Beroe)
—	MF	RUS	Vladimir Gerasimov (to Levski Sofia)
—	MF	BUL	Georgi Iliev (to Lokomotiv Plovdiv)
—	MF	BUL	Ivo Mihaylov (to Lokomotiv Plovdiv)
—	MF	BUL	Kristiyan Dobrev (to Lokomotiv Sofia)
—	MF	BUL	Marin Petrov (to Naftex Burgas)
—	MF	BUL	Asen Bukarev (to Levski Sofia)
—	FW	MLT	Daniel Bogdanović (to (Malta) Sliema Wanderers)
—	FW	SCG	Darko Spalević (to Lokomotiv Plovdiv)
—	FW	BUL	Kostadin Bashov (loan return to Levski Sofia)

=== Winter transfer window ===
In:

No.	Pos.	Nation	Player
—	DF	BUL	Kenan Kyazimov (from Etar 1924)
—	DF	BUL	Mariyan Germanov (from Botev Plovdiv)
—	MF	BUL	Rosen Emilov (from (Turkey) Adanaspor)
—	FW	BUL	Valentin Stanchev (Free agent)

Out:

No.	Pos.	Nation	Player
—	MF	BUL	Konstantin Mirchev (to CSKA Sofia)

== Squad and league statistics ==
Goalkeepers
1	(Bulgaria) Tihomir Todorov	?	(0)
12	(Bulgaria) Ivaylo Petrov	?	(0)
33	(Bulgaria) Krasimir Kolev	13	(0)

Defenders
2	(Bulgaria) Danail Bachkov	24	(0)
3	(Bulgaria) Stefan Goshev	?	(1)
4	(Georgia (country)) Vladimir Kakashvili	13	(1)
5	(Serbia and Montenegro) Miroslav Milošević	?	(1)
6	(Bulgaria) Gosho Ginchev	19	(4)
14	(Bulgaria) Kenan Kyazimov	?	(0)
17	(Bulgaria) Mariyan Germanov	11	(0)
23	(Georgia (country)) Levan Shavgulidze	?	(0)

Midfielders
8	(Bulgaria) Stanislav Genchev	29	(4)
10	(Bulgaria) Diyan Genchev	27	(2)
11	(Bulgaria) Ilian Iliev	18	(2)
13	(Bulgaria) Rosen Emilov	?	(0)
15	(Bulgaria) Nikolay Kondov	?	(0)
16	(Bulgaria) Ivan Georgiev	?	(0)
18	(Bulgaria) Petar Kostadinov	26	(0)
19	(Bulgaria) Martin Zafirov	18	(0)
20	(Bulgaria) Stanislav Stoyanov	23	(1)
24	(Bulgaria) Planimir Hristov	?	(0)
25	(Bulgaria) Ivo Klekov	?	(0)
30	(Ghana) Emanuel Bentil	9	(0)
	(Bulgaria) Konstantin Mirchev*	?	(2)

Forwards
7	(Bulgaria) Emil Todorov	?	(10)
9	(Bulgaria) Valentin Stanchev	9	(4)
21	(Bulgaria) Rumen Shankulov	28	(9)
27	(Bulgaria) Nikola Vasilev	?	(0)

Manager
(Bulgaria) Velislav Vutsov

- Mirchev left the club during the season.

== Matches ==
=== A Group ===
9 August 2003 Round 1	Marek Dupnitsa	4 – 2	Cherno More	Dupnitsa
18:00 EEST	E. Petkov 24'; Bibishkov 40'; Mujiri 45' (pen.); Pargov 46'; Chavdarov (yellow card); Y. Kyuchukov (yellow card); Mujiri (yellow card)	report	Shankulov 3', 25'; Stoyanov (yellow card)	Stadium: Boncuk; Attendance: 4,500

15 August 2003 Round 2	Cherno More	1 – 1	Spartak Varna	Varna
17:15 EEST	Mirchev 90+4' (pen.)		An. Petrov 52' (pen.)	Stadium: Ticha; Attendance: 7,000

23 August 2003 Round 3	Botev Plovdiv	3 – 4	Cherno More	Plovdiv
18:00 EEST	Milenov 2', 13'; Karamanov 42' (pen.)		Shankulov 34', 84'; D. Genchev 56'; E. Todorov 59'	Stadium: Hristo Botev; Attendance: 3,000

30 August 2003 Round 4	Cherno More	2 – 2	Chernomorets Burgas	Varna
18:00 EEST	E. Todorov 12'; Zhechev 76' (o.g.)		E. Angelov 31', 60'	Stadium: Ticha; Attendance: 4,000

13 September 2003 Round 5	Vidima-Rakovski	3 – 0	Cherno More	Sevlievo
17:00 EEST	Stoychev 8'; Evtimov 64', 83' (pen.)			Stadium: Rakovski; Attendance: 2,000

20 September 2003 Round 6	Cherno More	2 – 2	Lokomotiv Sofia	Varna
16:45 EEST	E. Todorov 48'; I. Iliev 55'		Donev 45+1'; Markov 86'; Hristozov (red card) 8'	Stadium: Ticha; Attendance: 2,000

28 September 2003 Round 7	Levski Sofia	0 – 0	Cherno More	Sofia
16:30 EEST	Golovskoy (yellow card); Ibraimov (yellow card); Bukarev (yellow card); Eromoigbe (yellow card); Chilikov (yellow card); Kostadinov (yellow card); Topuzakov (yellow card) (yellow-red card)	report	D. Genchev (yellow card); Shankulov (yellow card); Stoyanov (yellow card)	Stadium: Georgi Asparuhov; Attendance: 4,300; Referee: Galin Muskalev (Yambol)

3 October 2003 Round 8	Cherno More	1 – 0	Rodopa Smolyan	Varna
16:00 EEST	Milošević 28'			Stadium: Ticha

17 October 2003 Round 9	Belasitsa Petrich	3 – 1	Cherno More	Petrich
16:00 EEST	Vavá 5', 61'; Radojičić 50'		Ginchev 3' (pen.)	Stadium: Tsar Samuil; Attendance: 800

24 October 2003 Round 10	Litex Lovech	2 – 0	Cherno More	Lovech
16:30 EEST	T. Silva 43'; Zhelev 48'			Stadium: Lovech

31 October 2003 Round 11	Cherno More	1 – 2	Lokomotiv Plovdiv	Varna
13:00 EEST	E. Todorov 50'		Stoynev 80'; Kamburov 90+2'	Stadium: Ticha; Attendance: 2,500

8 November 2003 Round 12	Naftex Burgas	1 – 1	Cherno More	Burgas
16:30 EEST	Kiselichkov 36'		Shankulov 26'	Stadium: Lazur

22 November 2003 Round 13	Cherno More	0 – 3	Slavia Sofia	Varna
14:30 EEST			Vladimirov 4'; B. Georgiev 65'; Rangelov 75'	Stadium: Ticha; Attendance: 1,500

30 November 2003 Round 14	CSKA Sofia	2 – 0	Cherno More	Sofia
15:00 EEST	Gargorov 62', 79' (pen.); Sv. Petrov (yellow card); Brito (yellow card)	report	Bachkov (yellow card); Kakashvili (yellow card); Shankulov (yellow card); Kostadinov (yellow card); I. Georgiev (yellow card)	Stadium: Balgarska Armia; Attendance: 1,500; Referee: Momchil Vraykov (Pleven)

6 December 2003 Round 15	Cherno More	2 – 0	Makedonska slava	Varna
14:00 EEST	Goshev 48'; Mirchev 59'			Stadium: Ticha; Attendance: 1,000

14 February 2004 Round 16	Cherno More	3 – 0	Marek Dupnitsa	Varna
14:30 EEST	Kakashvili 9'; E. Todorov 19'; Shankulov 89'; Iliev (yellow card); M. Zafirov (yellow card)	report	Karakanov (yellow card); Ignatov (yellow card); Krastovchev (yellow card)	Stadium: Ticha

21 February 2004 Round 17	Spartak Varna	1 – 2	Cherno More	Varna
15:30 EEST	R. Todorov 84'		Savić 26' (o.g.); V. Stanchev 78'	Stadium: Spartak; Attendance: 3,000

28 February 2004 Round 18	Cherno More	3 – 1	Botev Plovdiv	Varna
14:00 EEST	Shankulov 20'; Ginchev 45+2' (pen.); I. Iliev 49'		Domakinov 44'	Stadium: Ticha; Attendance: 1,500

6 March 2004 Round 19	Chernomorets Burgas	0 – 3	Cherno More	Burgas
15:30 EEST			E. Todorov 6', 27'; Trifonov 72' (o.g.)	Stadium: Chernomorets; Attendance: 300

14 March 2004 Round 20	Cherno More	4 – 1	Vidima-Rakovski	Shumen
15:30 EEST	Shankulov 22'; St. Genchev 36', 72'; Ginchev 59' (pen.)		Kyosev 55'	Stadium: Panayot Volov; Attendance: 1,000

20 March 2004 Round 21	Lokomotiv Sofia	3 – 2	Cherno More	Sofia
15:30 EEST	Donev 24', 43'; K. Markov 82'		V. Stanchev 45+3'; E. Todorov 50'	Stadium: Lokomotiv; Attendance: 1,200

28 March 2004 Round 22	Cherno More	0 – 0	Levski Sofia	Varna
15:00 EEST	M. Zafirov (yellow card); Stoyanov (yellow card); Bachkov (yellow card); Iliev (yellow card); Kakashvili (yellow card); Milošević (yellow card); V. Stanchev (yellow card); Kostadinov (yellow card)		Markov (yellow card); G. Ivanov (yellow card); Golovskoy (yellow card); Temile (yellow card)	Stadium: Ticha; Attendance: 8,000; Referee: Stefan Gospodinov (Stara Zagora)

3 April 2004 Round 23	Rodopa Smolyan	2 – 0	Cherno More	Smolyan
16:30 EEST	Filipov 63'; R. Ivanov 80'			Stadium: Septemvri; Attendance: 3,000

10 April 2004 Round 24	Cherno More	0 – 0	Belasitsa Petrich	Varna
17:00 EEST				Stadium: Ticha; Attendance: 1,500

17 April 2004 Round 25	Cherno More	1 – 2	Litex Lovech	Varna
17:00 EEST	Ginchev 22' (pen.); Emilov (yellow card); Bachkov (yellow card); Stoyanov (yellow card)	report	Trică 60', 79'; Zhelev (yellow card); Hdiouad (yellow card); Trică (yellow card); T. Silva (yellow card); Belyakov (yellow card)	Stadium: Ticha; Attendance: 6,500

24 April 2004 Round 26	Lokomotiv Plovdiv	8 – 1	Cherno More	Plovdiv
15:00 EEST	Jančevski 4', 7', 21'; Kamburov 15', 51', 74'; Tunchev 20'; Jayeoba 25'		Dimov 84'	Stadium: Lokomotiv; Attendance: 2,000

1 May 2004 Round 27	Cherno More	2 – 2	Naftex Burgas	Varna
17:30 EEST	E. Todorov 23', 35'		Krumov 6', 51' (pen.)	Stadium: Ticha; Attendance: 500

5 May 2004 Round 28	Slavia Sofia	2 – 0	Cherno More	Sofia
17:30 EEST	Karaslavov 8'; B. Georgiev 90+2'			Stadium: Slavia; Attendance: 150

8 May 2004 Round 29	Cherno More	3 – 0	CSKA Sofia	Varna
17:30 EEST	St. Genchev 17', 90+1'; Stoyanov 51'; Germanov (yellow card)	report	Mitrevski (yellow card); Olegov (yellow card); Yoshev (yellow card); Manolov (yellow card)	Stadium: Ticha; Attendance: 1,500; Referee: Georgi Ignatov (Sofia)

15 May 2004 Round 30	Makedonska slava	3 – 4	Cherno More	Blagoevgrad
17:30 EEST	Bizhev 4' (pen.), 21' (pen.); Yurukov 60'; Voynov (yellow card)	report	V. Stanchev 3', 36'; Shankulov 58'; D. Genchev 76'; Stoyanov (yellow card); D. Genchev (yellow card)	Stadium: Hristo Botev; Attendance: 200

==== League table ====
Pos	Team	Pld	W	D	L	GF	GA	GD	Pts	Qualification or relegation
4	Litex Lovech	30	18	10	2	43	20	+23	64	Qualification for UEFA Cup second qualifying round
5	Slavia Sofia	30	18	3	9	57	30	+27	57	
6	Cherno More	30	10	8	12	45	53	−8	38 (Note: Cherno More ahead of Marek on head-to-head record; Cherno More–Marek 3–0, Marek–Cherno More 4–2.)	
7	Marek	30	12	2	16	33	50	−17	38	Qualification for Intertoto Cup second round
8	Naftex Burgas	30	9	8	13	49	38	+11	35	

Source: A PFG (in Bulgarian)
Rules for classification: 1st points; 2nd head-to-head points; 3rd head-to-head goal difference; 4th head-to-head goals scored; 5th head-to-head away goals scored; 6th season goal difference; 7th season goals scored; 8th "sportsmanship" (R & Y cards); 9th draw

==== Results summary ====
Overall								Home						Away					
Pld	W	D	L	GF	GA	GD	Pts	W	D	L	GF	GA	GD	W	D	L	GF	GA	GD
30	10	8	12	45	53	−8	38	6	6	3	25	16	+9	4	2	9	20	37	−17

==== League performance ====
Round	1	2	3	4	5	6	7	8	9	10	11	12	13	14	15	16	17	18	19	20	21	22	23	24	25	26	27	28	29	30
Ground	A	H	A	H	A	H	A	H	A	A	H	A	H	A	H	H	A	H	A	H	A	H	A	H	H	A	H	A	H	A
Result	L	D	W	D	L	D	D	W	L	L	L	D	L	L	W	W	W	W	W	W	L	D	L	D	L	L	D	L	W	W
Position	14	13	7	9	11	11	11	10	10	12	12	11	12	13	12	10	9	7	6	6	7	7	8	6	7	9	9	9	8	6

A = Away; H = Home; W = Win; D = Draw; L = Loss

==== Goalscorers in A Group ====
Rank	Scorer	Goals
1	(Bulgaria) Emil Todorov	10
2	(Bulgaria) Rumen Shankulov	9
3	(Bulgaria) Stanislav Genchev	4
3	(Bulgaria) Gosho Ginchev	4
3	(Bulgaria) Valentin Stanchev	4
6	(Bulgaria) Diyan Genchev	2
6	(Bulgaria) Ilian Iliev	2
6	(Bulgaria) Konstantin Mirchev	2
9	(Bulgaria) Stanislav Stoyanov	1
9	(Bulgaria) Stefan Goshev	1
9	(Georgia (country)) Vladimir Kakashvili	1
9	(Bulgaria) Daniel Dimov	1
9	(Serbia and Montenegro) Miroslav Milošević	1
