= 2007–08 B Group =

Bulgarian B Group
- Season: 2007–08
- Champions: Lokomotiv Mezdra (West); Sliven (East)
- Promoted: Lokomotiv Mezdra; Sliven; Minyor Pernik
- Relegated: Yantra; Velbazhd; Benkovski; Haskovo
- Matches: 364
- Goals: 979 (2.69 per match)

The 2007–08 B Group was the 52nd season of the Bulgarian B Football Group, the second tier of the Bulgarian football league system. The season started on 18 August 2007 and finished on 24 May 2008 with the A Group promotion play-off between the runners-up from both divisions.

== East B Group ==
=== Table ===
Pos	Team	Pld	W	D	L	GF	GA	GD	Pts	Promotion or relegation
1	Sliven (P)	26	19	3	4	63	23	+40	60	Promotion to 2008–09 A Group
2	Kaliakra Kavarna	26	16	6	4	49	17	+32	54	Qualification for Promotion play-off
3	Rodopa Smolyan	26	17	2	7	44	18	+26	53	
4	Nesebar	26	16	2	8	43	29	+14	50	
5	Dunav Ruse	26	12	6	8	35	28	+7	42	
6	Maritsa Plovdiv	26	10	5	11	34	41	−7	35	
7	Spartak Plovdiv	26	10	5	11	28	34	−6	35	
8	Naftex Burgas	26	9	7	10	40	35	+5	34	
9	Panayot Volov Shumen	26	9	4	13	23	35	−12	31	
10	Svetkavitsa Targovishte	26	8	4	14	26	46	−20	28	
11	AKB Minyor Radnevo	26	7	5	14	32	50	−18	26	
12	Svilengrad 1921	26	7	4	15	30	43	−13	25	
13	Benkovski Byala (R)	26	6	4	16	26	41	−15	22	Relegation to 2008–09 V Group
14	Haskovo (R)	26	6	3	17	24	57	−33	21	Relegation to 2008–09 V Group

Source: Soccerway
Rules for classification: 1) points; 2) goal difference; 3) number of goals scored.
(P) Promoted; (R) Relegated

== West B Group ==
=== Table ===
Pos	Team	Pld	W	D	L	GF	GA	GD	Pts	Promotion or relegation
1	Lokomotiv Mezdra (P)	26	20	3	3	56	12	+44	63	Promotion to 2008–09 A Group
2	Minyor Pernik (P)	26	14	5	7	45	31	+14	47	Qualification for Promotion play-off
3	Chavdar Etropole	26	14	4	8	39	23	+16	46	
4	Rilski Sportist Samokov	26	13	6	7	44	33	+11	45	
5	Belite Orli Pleven	26	11	5	10	33	31	+2	38	
6	Sportist Svoge	26	10	6	10	35	30	+5	36	
7	Etar Veliko Tarnovo	26	8	10	8	33	39	−6	34	
8	Montana	26	9	7	10	29	29	0	34	
9	Spartak Pleven	26	8	8	10	29	40	−11	32	
10	Akademik Sofia	26	9	5	12	41	43	−2	32	
11	Pirin Gotse Delchev	26	8	7	11	28	33	−5	31	
12	Chavdar Byala Slatina	26	6	7	13	19	34	−15	25	
13	Yantra Gabrovo (R)	26	6	6	14	31	48	−17	24	Relegation to 2008–09 V Group
14	Velbazhd Kyustendil (R)	26	5	3	18	20	56	−36	18	Relegation to 2008–09 V Group

Source: Soccerway
Rules for classification: 1) points; 2) goal difference; 3) number of goals scored.
(P) Promoted; (R) Relegated

== Promotion play-off ==
24 May 2008
17:00

Kaliakra Kavarna	2−2 (a.e.t.)	Minyor Pernik
Todorov 42' (pen.); Kateliev 112'		P. Petrov 54'; Dichev 120'
Penalties
Stoykov (penalty missed); Todorov (penalty scored); Yordanov (penalty scored); Dimitrov (penalty scored); Kateliev (penalty missed); Petkov (penalty scored); Kiskinov (penalty missed)	4−5	Dinkov (penalty scored); Ashimov (penalty scored); P. Petrov (penalty missed); Dichev (penalty scored); Rumenov (penalty missed); Stankov (penalty scored); Spahiev (penalty scored)

Lovech, Lovech
Attendance: 3,000

== Full Program ==
- West group program or
- East group program or
