= 2003–04 Bulgarian Cup =

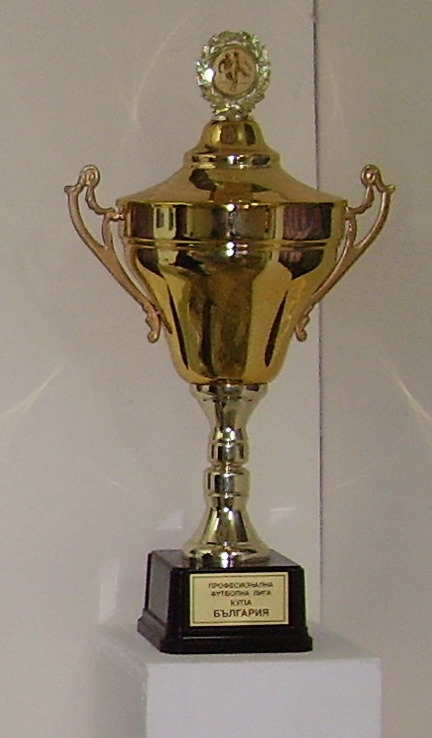

Tournament details
- Country: Bulgaria

Final positions
- Champions: Litex Lovech (2nd cup)
- Runners-up: CSKA Sofia

The 2003–04 Bulgarian Cup was the 64th season of the Bulgarian Cup. Litex Lovech won the competition, beating CSKA Sofia 6–5 on penalties in the final at the Vasil Levski National Stadium in Sofia.

== First round ==
In this round entered winners from the preliminary rounds together with the teams of B Group.

21 October 2003	Chepinets Velingrad (III)	1–0	Shumen (II)	Velingrad
15:00 EEST	Chushkov 14'			Stadium: Chepinets; Attendance: 2,000

21 October 2003	Spartak Plovdiv (III)	2–1	Spartak Pleven (II)	Plovdiv
15:00 EEST	Lishev 3'; Stalev 38'		Gerov 65'	Stadium: Todor Diev; Attendance: 300

21 October 2003	Benkovski Kostinbrod (III)	1–0	Conegliano German (II)	Kostinbrod
15:00 EEST	Karadzhinov 52' (pen.)			Stadium: Georgi Benkovski; Attendance: 100

21 October 2003	Beloslav 1918 (III)	0–2	Svetkavitsa Targovishte (II)	Beloslav
15:00 EEST			Yanchev 67' (pen.); B. Georgiev 77'	Stadium: Vatev; Attendance: 150

21 October 2003	Sokol Trastenik (IV)	1–4	Dobrudzha Dobrich (II)	Trastenik
15:00 EEST	Simeonov 17'		A. Dimitrov 21'; Kondev 35'; Todorov 45'; Jovanović 50'	Stadium: Atletik; Attendance: 200

21 October 2003	Orlovets Pobeda (III)	3–2	Vihar-Vladislav (II)	Pobeda
15:00 EEST

21 October 2003	Sliven 2000 (III)	4–2 (a.e.t.)	Rilski Sportist (II)	Sliven
15:00 EEST	Kinov 16', 47'; I. Stoyanov 92'; Gyulev 97'		Andreev 9', 52'	Stadium: Hadzhi Dimitar; Attendance: 200

21 October 2003	Arkus Lyaskovets (III)	0–3	Beroe Stara Zagora (II)	Lyaskovets
15:00 EEST			Kovachev 11', 77'; Tomanov 41'	Stadium: Mihail Aleksiev; Attendance: 150

21 October 2003	Yantra Gabrovo (III)	1–2	Septemvri Sofia (II)	Gabrovo
15:00 EEST	Tsitlakidis 44'		Vodenicharov 5'; Karadzhov 72'	Stadium: Hristo Botev; Attendance: 200

21 October 2003	Minyor Pernik (III)	2–2 (2–4 p)	Belite orli Pleven (II)	Pernik
15:00 EEST	Shipkov 40' (o.g.); Serafimov 86'		Shipkov 27'; Đokić 63'	Stadium: Minyor; Attendance: 150

21 October 2003	Dorostol Silistra (III)	1–0	Nesebar (II)	Silistra
15:00 EEST	Tonchev 27'			Stadium: Louis Eyer; Attendance: 600

21 October 2003	Ludogorets Razgrad (III)	0–0 (a.e.t.) (2–4 p)	Akademik Svishtov (II)	Razgrad
15:00 EEST				Stadium: Dyanko Stefanov; Attendance: 300

21 October 2003	Kameno (III)	0–0 (a.e.t.) (5–4 p)	Etar 1924 Veliko Tarnovo (II)	Kameno
15:00 EEST				Stadium: Gradski; Attendance: 150

21 October 2003	Pirinski Minyor Brezhani (IV)	0–4	Vihren Sandanski (II)	Brezhani
15:00 EEST			Yankov 23'; Spasov 53'; Chokarov 71'; Dermendzhiev 73'	Stadium: Brezhani; Attendance: 100

21 October 2003	Rasovo (III)	2–3	Pirin Blagoevgrad (II)	Rasovo
15:00 EEST	Dragiev 24'; G. Georgiev 71'		Anev 17'; Brankov 65'; Zlatinov 67'	Stadium: Rasovo

21 October 2003	Haskovo (III)	3–0 (w/o)	Sokol Markovo (II)	Haskovo
15:00 EEST

== Second round ==
This round featured winners from the First Round and all teams of A Group.

Team 1	Agg.	Team 2	1st leg	2nd leg
28 October / 12 November 2003
Chepinets Velingrad	0–8	Lokomotiv Plovdiv	0–5	0–3
Belite orli Pleven	0–5	Botev Plovdiv	0–2	0–3
Dorostol Silistra	1–4	Rodopa Smolyan	1–1	0–3
Pirin Blagoevgrad	0–2	CSKA Sofia	0–0	0–2
Benkovski Kostinbrod	2–7	Cherno More Varna	1–4	1–3
Dobrudzha Dobrich	3–5	Marek Dupnitsa	2–1	1–4(a.e.t.)
Kameno	0–2	Vidima-Rakovski	0–1	0–1
Litex Lovech	6–2	Svetkavitsa	3–0	3–2
Akademik Svishtov	0–2	Makedonska Slava	0–1	0–1
Orlovets Pobeda	0–11	Slavia Sofia	0–5	0–6
Haskovo	0–5	Spartak Varna	0–2	0–3
Septemvri Sofia	0–6 (w/o)	Chernomorets Burgas	0–3	0–3
Spartak Plovdiv	0–3	Belasitsa Petrich	0–1	0–2
Sliven 2000	0–5	Lokomotiv Sofia	0–2	0–3
Naftex Burgas	4–0	Beroe Stara Zagora	2–0	2–0
28 October / 13 November 2003
Vihren Sandanski	1–4	Levski Sofia	0–0	1–4

== Third round ==
=== First legs ===
26 November 2003	Litex Lovech	5–0	Slavia Sofia	Lovech
14:00 EEST	Zhelev 21' (pen.); Nikolov 31'; Yurukov 62', 65'; Jelenković 71'			Stadium: Gradski; Attendance: 1,000

26 November 2003	Naftex Burgas	2–0	Makedonska Slava	Burgas
14:00 EEST	Sakaliev 63' (pen.); Spasov 90'			Stadium: Lazur; Attendance: 1,000

26 November 2003	Cherno More Varna	2–0	Rodopa Smolyan	Varna
14:00 EEST	Shankulov 45'; I. Georgiev 58'			Stadium: Ticha; Attendance: 300

26 November 2003	Belasitsa Petrich	2–0	Vidima-Rakovski	Petrich
14:00 EEST	Pilitov 31'; Dimitrov 64'			Stadium: Tsar Samuil; Attendance: 300

26 November 2003	Lokomotiv Plovdiv	2–0	Chernomorets Burgas	Plovdiv
14:00 EEST	Spalević 44'; G. Iliev 58'			Stadium: Lokomotiv; Attendance: 1,200

26 November 2003	Lokomotiv Sofia	3–0	Spartak Varna	Sofia
14:00 EEST	Damyanov 23'; Donev 37' (pen.)			Stadium: Lokomotiv; Attendance: 400

26 November 2003	CSKA Sofia	5–0	Botev Plovdiv	Sofia
14:00 EEST	Sv. Petrov 6'; Yanev 12'; Brito 13', 21'; Gargorov 59'			Stadium: Balgarska Armiya; Attendance: 1,300

3 December 2003	Marek Dupnitsa	2–2	Levski Sofia	Dupnitsa
14:00 EEST	Pargov 5'; Bibishkov 63'		Chilikov 41'; Bukarev 54'	Stadium: Bonchuk; Attendance: 1,500

=== Second legs ===
3 December 2003	Slavia Sofia	1–1 (1–6 agg.)	Litex Lovech	Sofia
13:00 EEST	Matić 86'		D. Rusev 78'	Stadium: Slavia; Attendance: 100

3 December 2003	Makedonska Slava	1–0 (1–2 agg.)	Naftex Burgas	Simitli
13:00 EEST	Lyaskov 73'			Stadium: Struma; Attendance: 300

3 December 2003	Rodopa Smolyan	4–1 (4–3 agg.)	Cherno More Varna	Smolyan
13:00 EEST	I. Petrov 36', 54'; Istrevski 68'; Filipov 70'		Mirchev 49'	Stadium: Septemvri; Attendance: 800

3 December 2003	Vidima-Rakovski	3–0 (3–2 agg.)	Belasitsa Petrich	Sevlievo
13:00 EEST	Podvarzachov 43'; Radulov 68', 90'			Stadium: Rakovski; Attendance: 500

3 December 2003	Chernomorets Burgas	1–1 (1–3 agg.)	Lokomotiv Plovdiv	Burgas
13:00 EEST	Traykov 41' (pen.)		Kamburov 71'	Stadium: Chernomorets; Attendance: 100

3 December 2003	Spartak Varna	0–0 (0–3 agg.)	Lokomotiv Sofia	Varna
13:00 EEST				Stadium: Spartak; Attendance: 150

3 December 2003	Botev Plovdiv	1–2 (1–7 agg.)	CSKA Sofia	Plovdiv
13:00 EEST	Milenov 46'		Valkov 16'; Yanev 86'	Stadium: Hristo Botev; Attendance: 1,000

10 December 2003	Levski Sofia	4–1 (6–3 agg.)	Marek Dupnitsa	Sofia
13:00 EEST	Demba-Nyrén 8'; Temile 25'; Topuzakov 54'; Chilikov 67'		Lyubenov 34' (pen.)	Stadium: Georgi Asparuhov; Attendance: 500

== Quarter-finals ==
=== First legs ===
13 December 2003	CSKA Sofia	6–0	Rodopa Smolyan	Sofia
13:00 EEST	Gargorov 8', 38'; Yanev 52', 80'; E. Yordanov 67'; Yanchev 70'	Report		Stadium: Balgarska Armiya; Attendance: 300; Referee: Hristo Ristoskov (Sandanski)

13 December 2003	Vidima-Rakovski	0–0	Lokomotiv Sofia	Sevlievo
13:00 EEST				Stadium: Rakovski; Attendance: 1,000

14 December 2003	Levski Sofia	1–1	Lokomotiv Plovdiv	Sofia
13:00 EEST	Demba-Nyrén 55'	Report	Kamburov 66'	Stadium: Georgi Asparuhov; Attendance: 6,000; Referee: Tsvetan Georgiev (Sofia)

10 March 2004	Naftex Burgas	1–0	Litex Lovech	Burgas
17:00 EEST	A. Petrov 30'			Stadium: Lazur; Attendance: 7,000

=== Second legs ===
17 December 2003	Rodopa Smolyan	1–0 (1–6 agg.)	CSKA Sofia	Smolyan
13:00 EEST	Filipov 90+2'	Report		Stadium: Septemvri; Attendance: 1,300; Referee: Angel Angelov (Sofia)

17 December 2003	Lokomotiv Sofia	3–1 (3–1 agg.)	Vidima-Rakovski	Sofia
13:00 EEST	Kaptiev 42'; R. Ivanov 46'; Topuzov 87'		Zelenkov 21'	Stadium: Lokomotiv; Attendance: 100

18 December 2003	Lokomotiv Plovdiv	3–0 (4–1 agg.)	Levski Sofia	Plovdiv
13:00 EEST	Mihaylov 22'; Kamburov 45+3'; Milovanović 89'	Report		Stadium: Lokomotiv; Attendance: 7,000; Referee: Dimitar Kostov (Burgas)

17 March 2004	Litex Lovech	2–0 (2–1 agg.)	Naftex Burgas	Lovech
17:00 EEST	Zhelev 9'; Kirilov 88'			Stadium: Gradski; Attendance: 2,000

== Semi-finals ==
=== First legs ===
7 April 2004	Litex Lovech	1–0	Lokomotiv Plovdiv	Lovech
16:30 EEST	Janković 26'			Stadium: Gradski; Attendance: 3,500

7 April 2004	Lokomotiv Sofia	0–1	CSKA Sofia	Sofia
16:30 EEST		Report	Yanev 55'	Stadium: Lokomotiv; Attendance: 3,000; Referee: Anton Genov (Gabrovo)

=== Second legs ===
21 April 2004	Lokomotiv Plovdiv	1–1 (1–2 agg.)	Litex Lovech	Plovdiv
16:30 EEST	Jayeoba 30'		Janković 67' (pen.)	Stadium: Lokomotiv; Attendance: 7,000

21 April 2004	CSKA Sofia	4–0 (5–0 agg.)	Lokomotiv Sofia	Sofia
16:30 EEST	Sakaliev 9'; Yanchev 11'; Yanev 58'; Hazurov 76'	Report		Stadium: Balgarska Armiya; Attendance: 1,500; Referee: Hristo Ristoskov (Sandanski)

== Final ==
=== Details ===
12 May 2004
17:30 EEST

Litex Lovech	2–2	CSKA Sofia
Zhelev 38'; Hdiouad 85'		João Carlos 57'; Gargorov 72'
Penalties
Trică (penalty scored); Zhelev (penalty scored); Jelenković (penalty missed); Dimitrov (penalty missed); Dzhambazov (penalty scored); Bachev (penalty missed); Hdiouad (penalty scored)	6–5	(penalty scored) Petrov; (penalty scored) Dimitrov; (penalty scored) Charras; (penalty missed) Yanchev; (penalty missed) Kolev; (penalty missed) Sakaliev; (penalty missed) Gueye

Vasil Levski Stadium, Sofia
Attendance: 11,461
Referee: Hristo Ristoskov (Sandanski)

Litex	CSKA

== Top scorers ==
Rank	Scorer	Club	Goals
1	(Bulgaria) Hristo Yanev	CSKA Sofia	7
2	(Bulgaria) Zhivko Zhelev	Litex Lovech	4
2	(Bulgaria) Georgi Bizhev	Slavia Sofia	4
2	(Serbia and Montenegro) Darko Spalević	Lokomotiv Plovdiv	4
2	(Bulgaria) Ivan Georgiev	Cherno More	4
2	(Bulgaria) Rumen Shankulov	Cherno More	4
2	(Bulgaria) Emil Gargorov	CSKA Sofia	4
8	(Bulgaria) Ivaylo Petrov	Rodopa Smolyan	3
8	(Bulgaria) Dimitar Damyanov	Lokomotiv Sofia	3
8	(Bulgaria) Martin Kamburov	Lokomotiv Plovdiv	3
8	(Bulgaria) Dimitar Rangelov	Slavia Sofia	3
8	(Bulgaria) Borislav Dimitrov	Levski Sofia	3
