= Marko Ilić =

Marko Ilić may refer to:

- Marko Ilić (footballer, born 1985), Serbian football midfielder
- Marko Ilić (footballer, born 1998), Serbian football goalkeeper for Kortrijk
