= Damyan Yordanov =

Bulgarian footballer

Personal information
- Full name: Damyan Ivanov Yordanov
- Date of birth: 30 May 2005 (age 21)
- Place of birth: Varna, Bulgaria
- Height: 1.79 m (5 ft 10 in)
- Positions: Left-back; winger

Team information
- Current team: Al-Ula
- Number: 30

Youth career
- Olympic Varna
- –2021: Spartak Varna
- 2021–2024: Beroe
- 2023–2024: → Lazio (loan)

Senior career*
| Years | Team | Apps | (Gls) |
| 2022–2024 | Beroe II | 41 | (8) |
| 2023–2024 | Beroe | 16 | (0) |
| 2024–2025 | Botev Plovdiv II | 29 | (2) |
| 2024–2025 | Botev Plovdiv | 0 | (0) |
| 2025–2026 | Spartak Varna | 31 | (1) |
| 2026– | Al-Ula | 2 | (0) |

International career^{‡}
| 2022 | Bulgaria U17 | 1 | (0) |
| 2023–2024 | Bulgaria U19 | 3 | (0) |
| 2025– | Bulgaria U21 | 5 | (0) |
- * Club domestic league appearances and goals as of 16:34, 9 September 2026 (UTC) ‡ National team caps and goals as of 18:11, 1 October 2026 (UTC)

Damyan Yordanov (Bulgarian: Дамян Йорданов; born 30 May 2005) is a Bulgarian professional footballer who plays as a left-back or winger for Saudi First Division League club Al-Ula.

== Career ==
Born in Varna, Yordanov started his youth career in the local Olympic Varna and Spartak Varna academies, before moving to Beroe. He made his debut for the first team in 2023. In September 2023 he was sent on loan to Lazio Primavera. He spent a season in Italy and despite being regular for Lazio youth team, he returned to Beroe. In July 2024 he resigned with Beroe. On 31 July 2024 he signed a contract with Botev Plovdiv.
