= Hristo Markov =

Hristo Markov may refer to:

- Khristo Markov (born 1965), Bulgarian former triple jumper
- Hristo Markov (footballer) (born 1985), Bulgarian footballer
