= Ivan Naydenov =

Bulgarian footballer and manager

Personal information
- Full name: Ivan Ivanov Naydenov
- Date of birth: 26 October 1981 (age 45)
- Place of birth: Silistra, Bulgaria
- Height: 1.82 m (6 ft 0 in)
- Position: Midfielder

Team information
- Current team: Olympic Varna

Youth career
- FC Fairplay

Senior career*
Years	Team	Apps	(Gls)
2000–2002	FC Fairplay	67	(23)
2003–2006	Slavia Sofia	17	(1)
2006–2008	Spartak Varna	31	(9)
2008	ASIL Lysi	13	(1)
2009	Spartak Varna	17	(3)
Total		145	(37)

Managerial career
- 2012–2013: Spartak Varna
- 2014–2015: Dorostol Silistra
- 2016: Topolite
- 2017–2022: Olympic Varna (youth coach)
- 2022–: Olympic Varna
- * Club domestic league appearances and goals

Ivan Naydenov (Bulgarian: Иван Найденов; born 26 October 1981) is a former Bulgarian footballer and currently manager at Olympic Varna.
