= Ventsislav Marinov =

Bulgarian footballer

Personal information
- Full name: Ventsislav Ivanov Marinov
- Date of birth: 21 February 1983 (age 43)
- Place of birth: Varna, Bulgaria
- Height: 1.87 m (6 ft 2 in)
- Position: Centre back

Youth career
- 1992–2000: FC Fairplay

Senior career*
Years	Team	Apps	(Gls)
2000–2003	FC Fairplay		
2004–2008	Spartak Varna	68	(5)
2009	Chernomorets Balchik	18	(0)
2010	Spartak Varna	9	(1)
2010	Topolite	14	(2)
2011	Dorostol Silistra	12	(0)
2011	Svetkavitsa	9	(0)
2012–2013	Spartak Varna	29	(3)
- * Club domestic league appearances and goals as of 13 May 2013

Ventsislav Marinov (born 21 February 1983 in Varna) is a Bulgarian footballer who plays as a defender.
