= FC Olympic Varna =

Olympic Varna
- Full name: Футболен Клуб Олимпик Варна; Football Club Olympic Varna
- Founded: 2 July 2017; 9 years ago
- Ground: Sport Complex Lokomotiv, Varna
- Capacity: 2000
- Chairman: Dian Genchev
- Manager: Ivan Karadzhov
- League: Third League
- 2025–26: 9th
- Website: https://olimpikvarna.com/
Home colours	Away colours

Olympic Varna (Bulgarian: Олимпик Варна) is a Bulgarian football team based in Varna. Founded in 2017, and currently plays in Third League, the third tier of Bulgarian football. Olympic's home ground is the Sport Palace Stadium, which has a capacity of 500 spectators, but the team plays their official matches on Sport Complex Lokomotiv in Varna. Olympic's main colors are red, white and blue.

== History ==
Olympic Varna was established in the summer of 2016 as a feeder academy of Spartak Varna. Following the changes in Spartak, the academy separated from them in 2017 led by Dian Genchev, Marin Petrov, Ivan Naydenov, Zhivko Boyadzhiev and Ivan Karadzhov, all of them footballers, most of them born and raised in Varna. The team joined several youth leagues and operated as an academy team.

In 2022 the team joined Bulgarian B Regional Varna league and won promotion in their first season. On 15 October, in a match against Devnya, Karadzhov pulled the squad off the field in the halftime, after their goalkeeper's cheekbone was broken and two other Olympic players were physically abused. The team was expelled from the league and Karadzhov was banned for one year, but later the team was restored. They finished the 2024–25 season in second place, but as the only team with interest to promote, they were promoted to Third League. The team started with two wins and a loss in the first three games with all of the players being from the academy, except the one. The team finished their debut season in ninth place.

== Players ==
=== Current squad ===
As of 12 August 2024

Note: Flags indicate national team as defined under FIFA eligibility rules; some limited exceptions apply. Players may hold more than one non-FIFA nationality.

No.	Pos.	Nation	Player
1	GK	UKR	Igor Klopka
2	DF	BUL	Ivan Borislavov
3	DF	BUL	Vladislav Georgiev
4	MF	BUL	Dimitar Kolev
5	DF	BUL	Todor Kolev
6	DF	BUL	Georgi Dimitrov
7	MF	BUL	Mihael Nikolov
8	MF	BUL	Ivan Markov
9	FW	BUL	Aleksandar Grozev
10	FW	BUL	Rosen Kosev
11	DF	BUL	Nikola Stoyanov
12	GK	BUL	Nikola Terziev
13	DF	BUL	Toma Todorov

No.	Pos.	Nation	Player
14	MF	BUL	Stanimir Minkov
15	DF	BUL	Momchil Radev
17	FW	BUL	Vladimir Georgiev
19	DF	BUL	Ivan Dimitrov
20	MF	BUL	Svetlozar Popov
23	DF	BUL	Dzhem Beytulov
—	GK	BUL	Petar Yordanov
—	DF	BUL	Pavel Gerdzhikov
—	MF	BUL	Samuil Gichkov
—	MF	BUL	Dimitar Hristov
—	FW	BUL	Boyan Nikolov
—	FW	UKR	Oleksiy Mazhynskyi

== Personnel ==
=== Club officials ===
Position	Name	Nationality
Coaching staff
Head coach	Ivan Karadzhov	(Bulgaria)
Assistant coach	Ivan Naydenov	(Bulgaria)
Youth coach	Zhivko Boyadzhiev	(Bulgaria)
Youth coach	Dian Genchev	(Bulgaria)
Goalkeepers coach

=== Managerial history ===
Dates	Name	Honours
2022–2024	(Bulgaria) Ivan Karadzhov	
2024–2025	(Bulgaria) Ivan Naydenov (interim)	
2025–	(Bulgaria) Ivan Karadzhov	

== Seasons ==
=== Detailed league history ===
Results of league and cup competitions by season
Season	League											Top goalscorer	
Season	Division	Level	P	W	D	L	F	A	GD	Pts	Pos	Top goalscorer	
2022–23	B Regional Varna	5	16	13	1	2	51	13	+38	40	1st ↑		
2023–24	A Regional Varna	4	20	11	3	6	46	23	+23	36	5th		
2024–25	A Regional Varna	4	18	13	4	1	83	19	+64	43	2nd ↑		
2025–26	Third League	3	32	10	6	16	58	80	-22	36	9th	(Bulgaria) Aleksandar Grozdev	21
2026–27	Third League	3											
