= Zhivko Boyadzhiev =

Bulgarian footballer

Personal information
- Full name: Zhivko Krasimirov Boyadzhiev
- Date of birth: 6 November 1976 (age 49)
- Place of birth: Varna, Bulgaria
- Height: 1.80 m (5 ft 11 in)
- Position: Midfielder

Team information
- Current team: Olympic Varna (youth coach)

Senior career*
Years	Team	Apps	(Gls)
1995–2000	FC Fearplay	83	(30)
2001	Slavia Sofia	12	(0)
2002	Dobrudzha Dobrich	12	(2)
2002–2003	FC Fearplay	27	(8)
2004	Spartak Varna	12	(1)
2005	Lapta	22	(7)
2006	Spartak Varna	5	(1)
2006–2009	Kaliakra Kavarna	51	(1)
2010	Spartak Varna	13	(1)
2010–2011	Topolite		
2011–2012	FC Devnya	21	(2)
2012–2014	FC Provadia	35	(4)

Managerial career
- 2017–: Olympic Varna (youth coach)
- * Club domestic league appearances and goals

Zhivko Boyadzhiev (Bulgarian: Живко Бояджиев; born 6 November 1976) is a former Bulgarian footballer who played as a midfielder and now is youth coach at Olympic Varna.
