= Borislav Dichev =

Bulgarian footballer

Personal information
- Date of birth: 28 June 1979 (age 47)
- Place of birth: Sofia, Bulgaria
- Height: 1.90 m (6 ft 3 in)
- Position: Striker

Youth career
- Levski Sofia

Senior career*
Years	Team	Apps	(Gls)
1997–1999	Akademik Sofia	29	(3)
1999–2000	Septemvri Sofia	33	(5)
2001	Dunav Ruse	15	(3)
2001	Svetkavitsa	9	(2)
2002–2003	Septemvri Sofia	36	(22)
2003	Beroe Stara Zagora	13	(4)
2004	Septemvri Sofia	12	(1)
2004–2005	Minyor Pernik	43	(37)
2006	Belite orli	12	(4)
2006–2007	Vidima-Rakovski	26	(20)
2007–2009	Minyor Pernik	37	(11)

International career
1999–2000	Bulgaria U21	4	(0)
- * Club domestic league appearances and goals

Borislav Dichev (Bulgarian: Борислав Дичев; born 28 June 1979) is a Bulgarian former footballer who played as an attacker.

== Career ==
Dichev was raised in Levski Sofia's youths teams.

While playing with Minyor Pernik in season 2004–05, Dichev scored 35 goals in 31 matches in the Bulgarian third division.

With Vidima-Rakovski, Dichev became top goalscorer of the Bulgarian second division in the 2006–07 season, with 20 goals in 26 matches. He was also named the best footballer of the Season in second division.

Between 1999 and 2000, Dichev was capped 4 times for the Bulgaria national under-21 football team.
