= Emil Trenkov =

Bulgarian footballer

Personal information
- Full name: Emil Aleksandrov Trenkov
- Date of birth: 27 June 1981 (age 45)
- Place of birth: Bulgaria
- Height: 1.79 m (5 ft 10 in)
- Position: Defender

Team information
- Current team: Vihren Sandanski
- Number: 19

Senior career*
Years	Team	Apps	(Gls)
2000–2004	Vihren Sandanski	63	(2)
2004–2005	Lokomotiv Sofia	18	(1)
2005–2008	Vihren Sandanski	74	(1)
2008	Lokomotiv Mezdra	3	(0)
2009–2010	Vihren Sandanski	35	(0)
2010	Ludogorets Razgrad	12	(1)
2011	Septemvri Simitli	13	(0)
2011–	Vihren Sandanski	?	(?)
- * Club domestic league appearances and goals as of 1 March 2014

Emil Trenkov (Bulgarian: Емил Тренков; born 27 June 1981) is a Bulgarian football player, currently playing for Vihren Sandanski as a defender. He is a right defender.

Trenkov started his career in 2004 with Lokomotiv Sofia before going to Vihren Sandanski from 2005 to 2008. He then played for Lokomotiv Mezdra in 2008 before going back to Vihren Sandanski.
