= Darin Todorov =

Bulgarian footballer

Personal information
- Date of birth: 4 December 1988 (age 37)
- Place of birth: Shumen, Bulgaria
- Height: 1.78 m (5 ft 10 in)
- Position: Striker

Youth career
- Spartak Varna

Senior career*
Years	Team	Apps	(Gls)
2006–2008	Spartak Varna		(2)
2008	Volov Shumen	0	(0)
2008–2009	Nesebar	0	(0)
2009–2010	Spartak Varna	14	(2)
- * Club domestic league appearances and goals

Darin Todorov (Bulgarian: Дарин Тодоров) (born 4 December 1988) is a Bulgarian former footballer who played as a striker.
