= Marcos da Silva (footballer) =

Brazilian footballer

Personal information
- Full name: Marcos Antonio Ricardo da Silva
- Date of birth: 16 January 1986 (age 40)
- Place of birth: São Caetano do Sul, Brazil
- Height: 1.78 m (5 ft 10 in)
- Position: Striker

Youth career
- São Caetano
- Santo André
- Paulista
- Grêmio
- Slavia Praha

Senior career*
Years	Team	Apps	(Gls)
2006–2008	Cherno More	38	(5)
2009	GE Catanduvense		
- * Club domestic league appearances and goals

Marcos Antonio Ricardo da Silva (born 16 January 1986 in São Caetano do Sul) is a Brazilian football (soccer) striker.

== Football career ==
Marcos da Silva started his career at São Caetano, where he was born. He then moved to Santo André, Paulista and Grêmio. He then moved to Slavia Praha youth team. Between 2006 and 2008 Marcos played in Bulgarian side Cherno More Varna. Marcos da Silva held the record for scoring the fastest goal in the A PFG (12 seconds after the start of a match) until he was surpassed by former teammate Miroslav Manolov in March 2012.
