= Yordan Terziev =

Bulgarian footballer

Personal information
- Full name: Yordan Hristov Terziev
- Date of birth: 20 July 1976 (age 50)
- Place of birth: Varna, Bulgaria
- Height: 1.90 m (6 ft 3 in)
- Position: Midfielder

Youth career
- Spartak Varna

Senior career*
Years	Team	Apps	(Gls)
1995–1998	Avtotreyd Aksakovo		
1998–1999	Antibiotik Razgrad	27	(6)
1999–2000	Botev Vratsa		
2001–2003	Levski Sofia	13	(0)
2002	→ Spartak Pleven (loan)		
2002	→ Spartak Varna (loan)	1	(0)
2003–2004	Doxa Drama		
2004–2005	Cherno More	21	(1)
2005–2006	Vidima-Rakovski		
- * Club domestic league appearances and goals

Yordan Terziev (Bulgarian: Йордан Терзиев; born 20 July 1976) is a former Bulgarian footballer who played as a midfielder.

== Club career ==
A product of the Spartak Varna youth system, Terziev appeared in 13 A PFG matches for Levski Sofia between 2000 and 2002. He participated in 3 games for the "bluemen" in European tournaments, scoring a goal against Željezničar on 11 July 2001. In the summer of 2002, Terziev was deemed surplus to the requirements by manager Slavoljub Muslin.

== Honours ==
Levski Sofia

- A Group: 2000–01
