= Kiril Dzhorov =

Bulgarian footballer

Personal information
- Full name: Kiril Borisov Dzhorov
- Date of birth: 12 August 1975 (age 51)
- Place of birth: Sandanski, Bulgaria
- Height: 1.77 m (5 ft 9 1/2 in)
- Positions: Right back; left back

Senior career*
Years	Team	Apps	(Gls)
1993–1997	Vihren Sandanski	83	(8)
1997–1999	Metalurg Pernik	56	(5)
1999	→ Minyor Pernik (loan)	13	(2)
2000–2006	Slavia Sofia	136	(7)
2005–2006	→ Rodopa Smolyan (loan)	21	(0)
2006–2008	Cherno More	45	(1)
2008–2009	Vihren Sandanski	39	(1)
2010	Lokomotiv Mezdra	11	(0)
2010–2011	Floriana	6	(1)
Total		410	(25)
- * Club domestic league appearances and goals

Kiril Dzhorov (Bulgarian: Кирил Джоров; born 12 August 1975) is a retired Bulgarian footballer who played as a defender.
