= Paulo Dias (footballer) =

Brazilian footballer (born 1944)

Personal information
- Full name: Paulo Roberto Dias
- Date of birth: February 27, 1944 (age 82)
- Place of birth: Rio de Janeiro, Brazil
- Position: Goalkeeper

Senior career*
Years	Team	Apps	(Gls)
1972	Miami Gatos	13	(0)
1979	Cleveland Cobras		

Managerial career
- 1991: Penn-Jersey Spirit
- 1991–: Harvard Crimson (assistant)
- * Club domestic league appearances and goals

Paulo Roberto Dias is a retired professional Brazilian football goalkeeper who played one season in the North American Soccer League.

== Player ==
In 1972, Dias played for the Miami Gatos in the North American Soccer League. In 1979, he played for the Cleveland Cobras in the American Soccer League.

== Coach ==
In July 1991, he replaced Dave MacWilliams as head coach of the Penn-Jersey Spirit of the American Professional Soccer League. On August 29, 1991, Harvard hired Dias as an assistant coach.
