= Anton Lichkov =

Bulgarian footballer (born 1980)

Personal information
- Full name: Anton Lyubomirov Lichkov
- Date of birth: 5 August 1980 (age 46)
- Place of birth: Petrich, Bulgaria
- Height: 1.78 m (5 ft 10 in)
- Position: Left back

Senior career*
Years	Team	Apps	(Gls)
2000–2003	Slavia Sofia	23	(0)
2003–2004	Beroe	7	(0)
2004–2008	Belasitsa Petrich	65	(2)
2009–2013	Montana	82	(0)
Total		177	(2)
- * Club domestic league appearances and goals as of 2 June 2013

Anton Lichkov (Bulgarian: Антон Личков: born 5 August 1980 in Petrich) is a Bulgarian former footballer, who played as a defender.
