= Vladan Milosavljević =

Serbian footballer

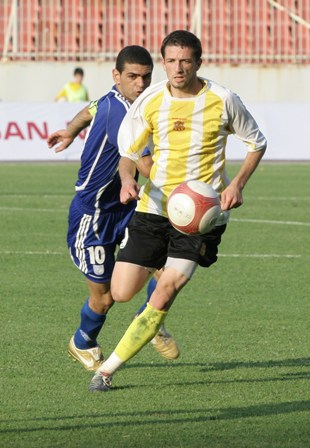

Personal information
- Date of birth: 4 March 1980 (age 46)
- Place of birth: Belgrade, SFR Yugoslavia
- Height: 1.78 m (5 ft 10 in)
- Position: Central midfielder

Youth career
- Partizan

Senior career*
Years	Team	Apps	(Gls)
1998–2001	Obilić	83	(3)
2001–2003	Železnik	11	(0)
2003–2004	Zemun	21	(0)
2004–2005	Cherno More	3	(0)
2005	Obilić	10	(0)
2006–2007	Makedonija GP	50	(3)
2008	Beroe Stara Zagora	11	(0)
2008–2009	Voždovac	12	(2)
2009	Sileks	12	(0)
2009–2010	Vardar	1	(0)
Total		214	(8)

International career
- FR Yugoslavia U17
- FR Yugoslavia U21
- * Club domestic league appearances and goals

Vladan Milosavljević (Serbian Cyrillic: Владан Милосављевић; born 4 March 1980) is a Serbian football midfielder.

Milosavljević started to play football in FK Partizan youth teams. When he was 18 years old he signed a professional contract with Obilić, with whom he was Champion of Serbia for the 1997/98 season.

After spending the first six years of his career in his home country with Obilić, FK Voždovac and FK Zemun, Milosavljević relocated to Bulgaria in June 2004, signing a contract with Cherno More.

In the next year Milosavljević transferred to Makedonija Gjorče Petrov, with whom he won the 2006 Macedonian Cup. Because of his good displays Milosavljević was named the 2007 Foreign Footballer of the Year in Macedonia.

In 2008, he played for six months in Bulgarian Beroe Stara Zagora. In June 2008 Milosavljević returned to Serbia and signed with FK Voždovac playing in Serbian First League. In June 2009 Milosavljević signed a contract with best Macedonian football club FK Vardar.
