= Martin Zafirov =

Bulgarian association football player

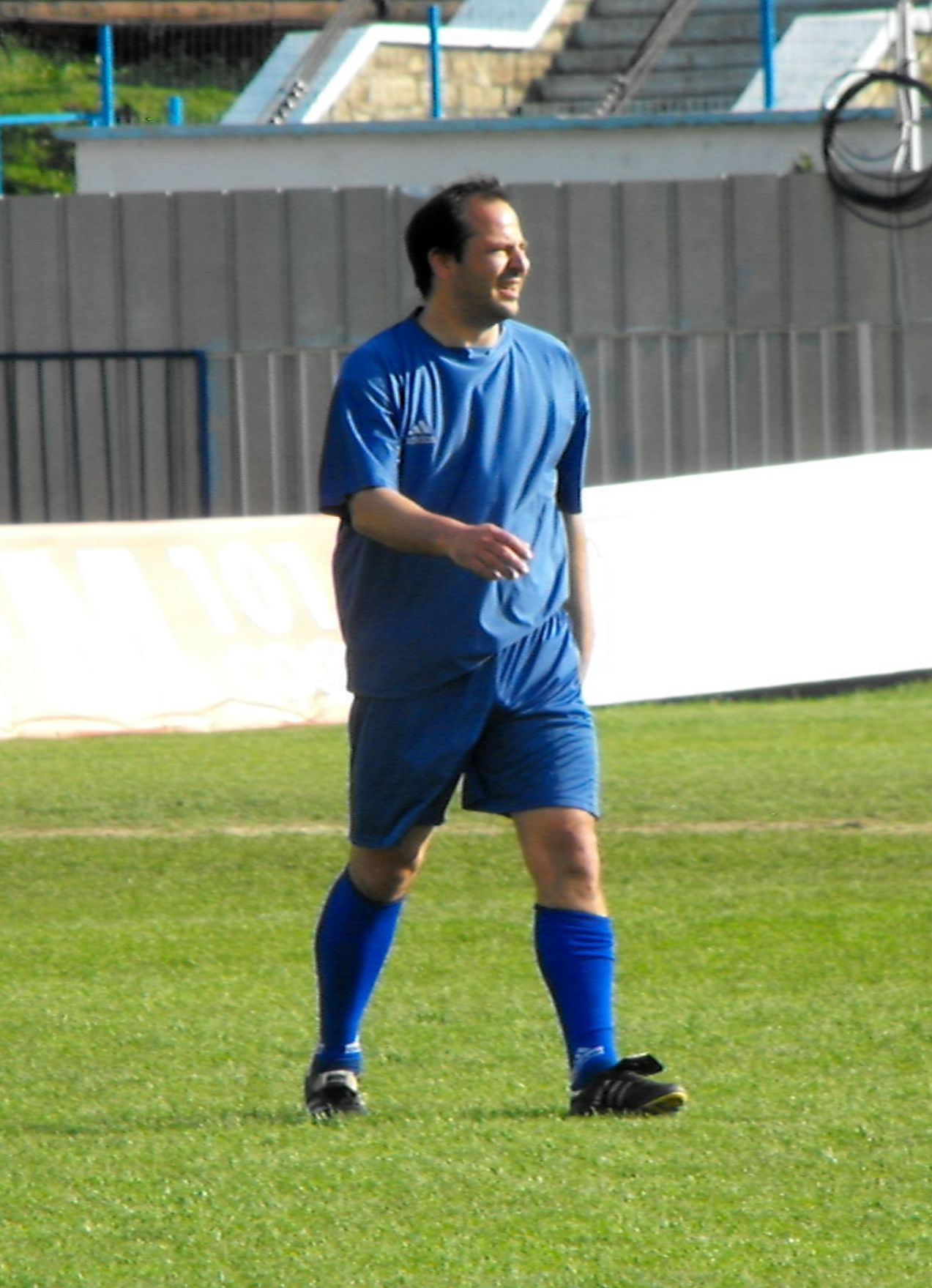

Personal information
- Full name: Martin Ivanov Zafirov
- Date of birth: 26 December 1973 (age 52)
- Place of birth: Sofia, Bulgaria
- Height: 1.74 m (5 ft 8 1/2 in)
- Position: Forward

Youth career
- CSKA Sofia

Senior career*
Years	Team	Apps	(Gls)
1990–1996	CSKA Sofia	45	(4)
1996–1997	Spartak Varna	28	(7)
1997	Hamburger SV	1	(0)
1997–1998	Lokomotiv 1929 Sofia	14	(0)
1998–2001	Spartak Varna	18	(1)
2001	Akratitos	53	(15)
2001–2003	Lokomotiv Plovdiv	17	(2)
2003–2004	Cherno More	18	(0)
2005–2008	Velbazhd Kyustendil		
2008–2009	Hebar		

International career
1994–1995	Bulgaria U21	4	(0)
1995	Bulgaria	3	(0)
- * Club domestic league appearances and goals

Martin Ivanov Zafirov (Bulgarian: Мартин Иванов Зафиров; born 26 December 1973 in Bulgaria) is a retired footballer. His father, Ivan Zafirov, and him brother, Adalbert Zafirov, are also footballers, both representing Bulgarian national team.
