= Petar Petrov (footballer, born 1984) =

Bulgarian footballer

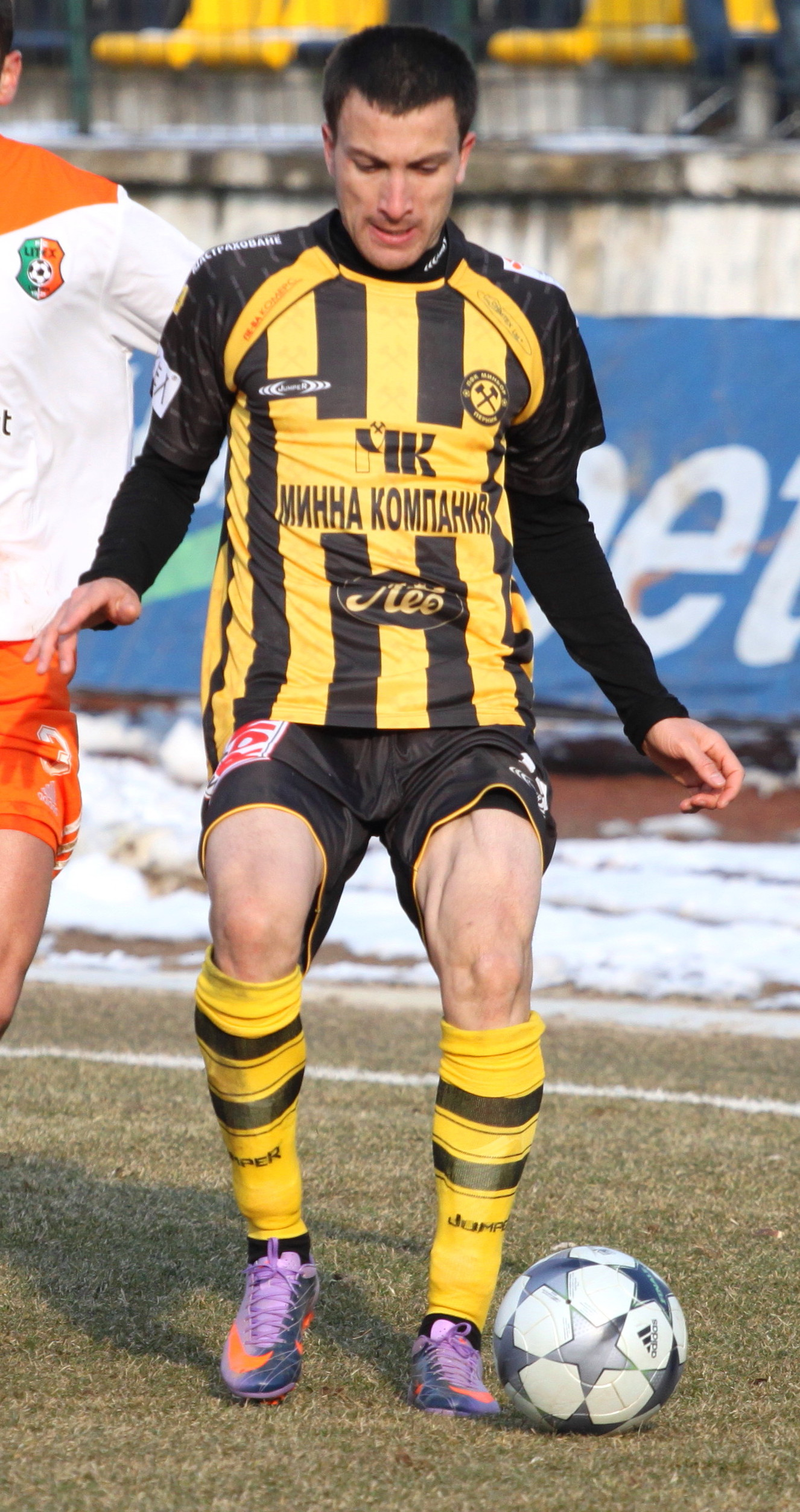

Personal information
- Full name: Petar Asenov Petrov
- Date of birth: 19 April 1984 (age 42)
- Place of birth: Sofia, Bulgaria
- Height: 1.78 m (5 ft 10 in)
- Position: Midfielder

Senior career*
Years	Team	Apps	(Gls)
2003–2007	Septemvri Sofia		
2007–2011	Minyor Pernik	73	(8)
2012	Bdin Vidin	9	(0)
2012	Montana	10	(1)
2013	Minyor Pernik	15	(1)
2013	Vitosha Bistritsa	10	(1)
2014	Rabotnicki Skopje	12	(3)
2014	Minyor Pernik	11	(5)
2015	Botev Vratsa	9	(0)
2015–2018	Botev Ihtiman		
2018–2021	Oborishte		
2021–2022	Kostinbrod		
- * Club domestic league appearances and goals as of 1 August 2018

Petar Asenov Petrov (Bulgarian: Петър Асенов Петров; born 19 April 1984) is a Bulgarian professional footballer who plays as a midfielder.

== Honours ==
=== Club ===
Rabotnicki Skopje

- First Macedonian League: 2013–14
