= Rumen Goranov =

Bulgarian footballer

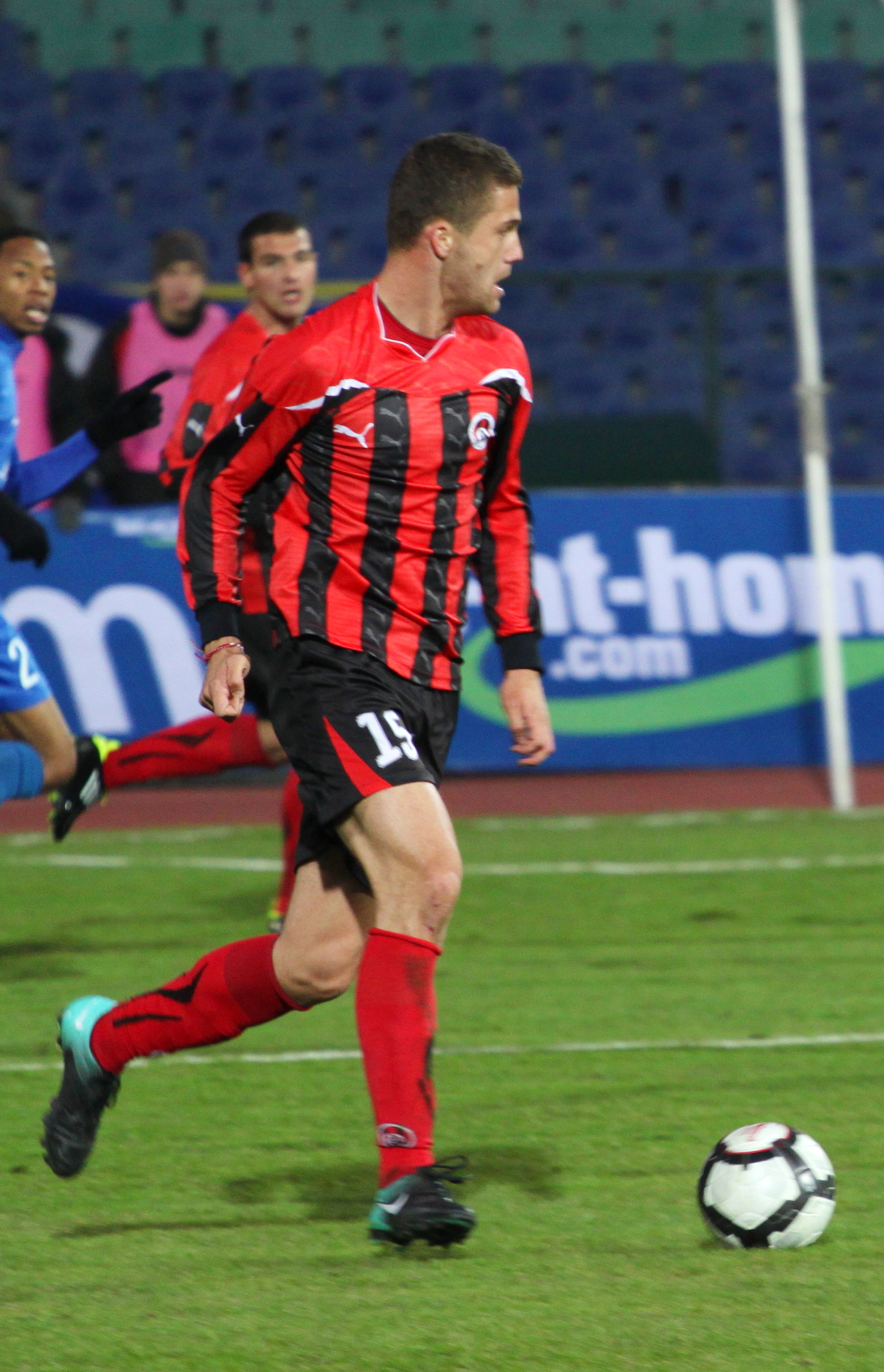

Personal information
- Full name: Rumen Rumenov Goranov
- Date of birth: 15 July 1984 (age 42)
- Place of birth: Sofia, Bulgaria
- Height: 1.89 m (6 ft 2 in)
- Position: Centre midfielder

Youth career
- Levski Sofia

Senior career*
Years	Team	Apps	(Gls)
2003–2006	Conegliano German	54	(12)
2006–2009	Lokomotiv Plovdiv	54	(7)
2009–2012	Lokomotiv Sofia	68	(4)
- * Club domestic league appearances and goals as of 20 July 2012

Rumen Goranov (born 15 July 1984) is a Bulgarian footballer.
