= Mauro Alegre =

Argentine footballer

Personal information
- Date of birth: 8 January 1988 (age 38)
- Place of birth: Argentina
- Position: Midfielder

Team information
- Current team: Chorrillo F.C.
- Number: 21

Youth career
- Atlético Villa Alvear

Senior career*
Years	Team	Apps	(Gls)
2006–2007	Botev Plovdiv	10	(1)
2007	→ AC Lugano (loan)	0	(0)
2008–2009	Botev Plovdiv	26	(0)
2011–	Chorrillo F.C.	5	(1)
- * Club domestic league appearances and goals as of 01:26, 27 February 2009 (UTC)

Mauro Alegre (born 8 January 1988) is an Argentine footballer. He is an attacking midfielder.

Alegre began his football career with little-known Argentine club Atlético Villa Alvear. At the age of 18 years he moved to Europe and signed a professional contract with Bulgarian club Botev Plovdiv. In 2007 the midfielder was loaned for six months to Swiss football club AC Lugano. In February 2011, Alegre joined Chorrillo F.C. in Panama.
