= F.C. Spartak Varna (Topoli) =

Spartak 1918 (Topolite)
- Full name: Football Club Topolite Topoli
- Nickname: The Blue Falcons
- Founded: 7 July 2010; 15 years ago
- Dissolved: 2011; 15 years ago
- Ground: Topoli Stadium, Topoli
- Capacity: 3,000
- Chairman: Nedelcho Mihaylov
- Manager: Boyko Kamenov
- League: North-East V AFG
| Home colours | Away colours |

Spartak 1918 Varna, but officially registered as Topolite Topoli, was a semi-professional Bulgarian football club based in Topoli.

The club has no home ground and uses the playground in Topoli near Varna. They are affectionately referred to as "The Falcons". The history of the team is identic like F.C. United of Manchester.

== History ==
The club was formed in 2010 by Spartak Varna supporters following Injstroi Holding's controversial takeover which led to most of its supporters defecting from the club. The newly formed Spartak 1918 merged with Topolite Topoli, which was playing in V Group. Due the fact that Spartak Varna were demolished in the same group, BUlgarian Football Union didn't allowed the club to have the Spartak 1918 name and had to play under Topolite Topoli name. In the early 2011 the team was dissolved.

== Fans ==
On 24 March 2000 was founded the official 'Fan Club Falcons', which has the goal to unite and organize the supporters of Spartak, and the different fan-formations of the Falcons in Varna. The fan-club was founded later, but finally, it was decided to create an official organization. The organization would coordinate the actions, make contacts with the governing body of the Football Club, have official meetings with the police authorities, etc. However, this organization is a successor of the long years of appearance of the fanatics of Spartak Varna and their devoted love and support for the beloved team. Fan groups from Spartak Varna have Left Wing political views.

Fan groups:

- Spartak Varna Ultra Division
- Mladost boys'95
- Vladislavovo boys'96
- Spartak youth
- Brigade hools

Motto:

- ALWAYS LOYAL TO SPARTAK / SEMPER FIDELES!

== Last squad ==
As of September 25, 2010 Note: Flags indicate national team as defined under FIFA eligibility rules; some limited exceptions apply. Players may hold more than one non-FIFA nationality.

| No. | Pos. | Nation | Player |
|---|---|---|---|
| 1 | GK | BUL | Stanislav Hristov |
| 3 | DF | BUL | Petar Aleksiev |
| 4 | DF | BUL | Dido Borisov |
| 5 | DF | BUL | Ventsislav Marinov |
| 6 | DF | BUL | Martin Lyubenov |
| 7 | MF | BUL | Marin Petrov |
| 8 | MF | BUL | Zhivko Boyadzhiev |
| 9 | FW | BUL | Rumen Aleksandrov |
| 10 | FW | SRB | Marko Ilić |
| 11 | MF | BUL | Boyko Kosev |

| No. | Pos. | Nation | Player |
|---|---|---|---|
| 12 | GK | BUL | Ivaylo Marinov |
| 13 | MF | BUL | Atanas Yovchev |
| 14 | MF | BUL | Stanislav Nikolov |
| 15 | DF | BUL | Nikolay Keratsin |
| 16 | FW | BUL | Ivan Karadzhov |
| 17 | MF | BUL | Kiril Nedev |
| 18 | DF | BUL | Radoslav Zhorev |
| 19 | FW | BUL | Milen Bratoev |
| 20 | MF | BUL | Georgi Bombov |
| 21 | MF | BUL | Yordan Penev |
