= Dian Kateliev =

Bulgarian footballer

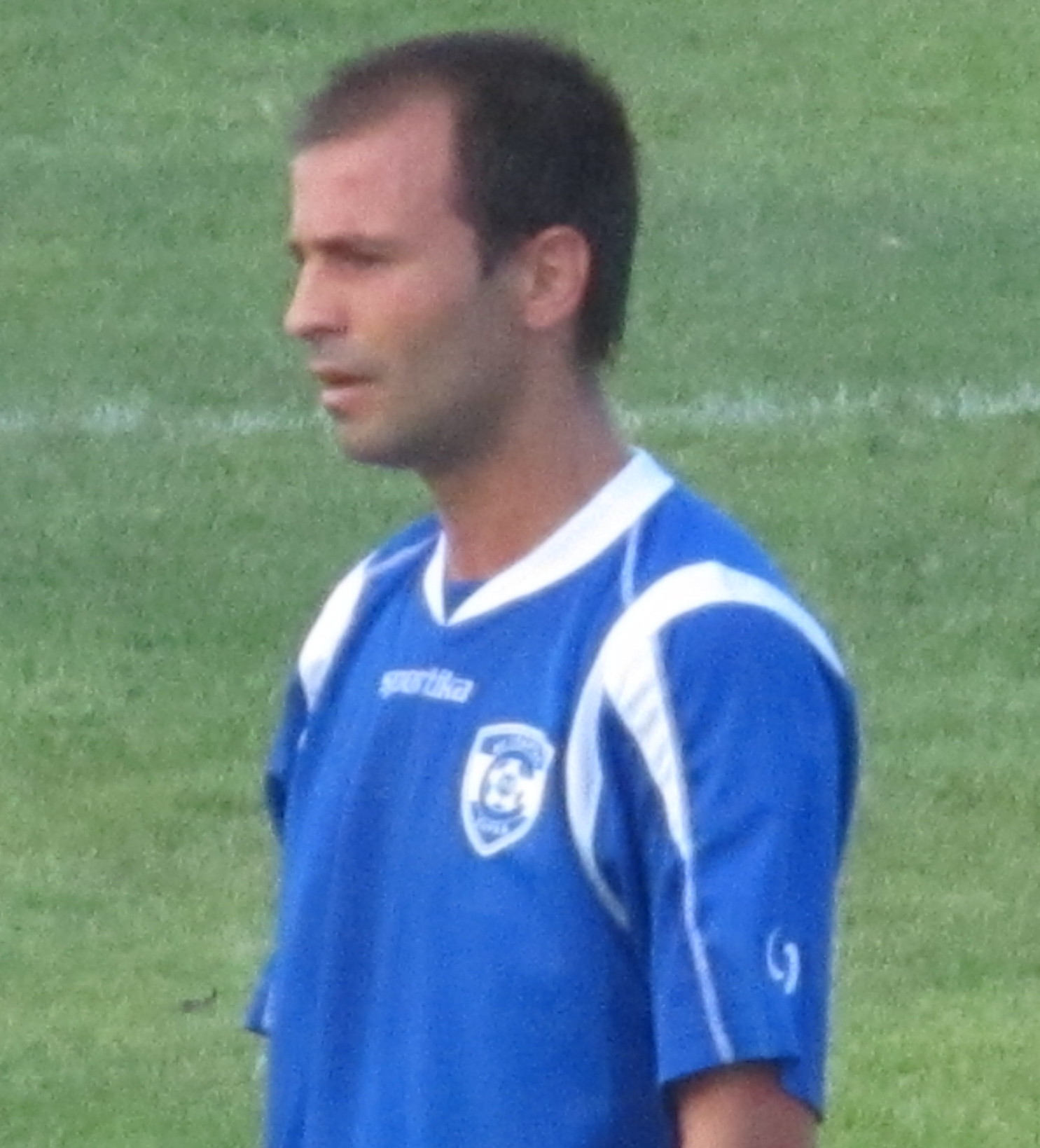

Personal information
- Full name: Dian Svetoslavov Kateliev
- Date of birth: 25 March 1980 (age 46)
- Place of birth: Devnya, Bulgaria
- Height: 1.78 m (5 ft 10 in)
- Position: Midfielder

Team information
- Current team: Spartak Varna
- Number: 8

Senior career*
Years	Team	Apps	(Gls)
1999–2003	OFC Devnya	?	(?)
2003–2006	Spartak Varna	67	(3)
2007–2011	Kaliakra Kavarna	79	(7)
2011–2013	Spartak 1918	44	(1)
2014–2016	OFC Devnya	?	(?)
2016–	Spartak Varna	6	(2)
- * Club domestic league appearances and goals as of 13:32, 27 September 2016 (UTC)

Dian Kateliev (Bulgarian: Диан Кателиев; born 25 March 1980) is a Bulgarian footballer, who currently plays as a midfielder for Spartak Varna.
