= Konstantine Darsania =

Georgian footballer

Personal information
- Full name: Konstantine Darsania
- Date of birth: 29 May 1984 (age 42)
- Place of birth: Tbilisi, Soviet Union
- Height: 1.82 m (5 ft 11 1/2 in)
- Position: Midfielder

Senior career*
Years	Team	Apps	(Gls)
2001–2002	Merani Tbilisi	4	(0)
2002–2003	Kolkheti-1913 Poti	8	(1)
2003–2004	Sioni Bolnisi	16	(0)
2004–2005	Cherno More	14	(3)
2005	Ameri Tbilisi	9	(0)
2006	Torpedo Kutaisi	8	(0)
2007–2008	Ayia Napa	13	(0)
2007–2008	Omonia Aradippou		
2008	Mglebi Zugdidi	14	(0)
2009	Borjomi	3	(0)
2009–2010	Lokomotivi Tbilisi	3	(0)

International career
2002–2003	Georgia U-19	5	(0)
2004	Georgia U-21	1	(0)
- * Club domestic league appearances and goals as of 10 June 2010

Konstantine Darsania (Georgian: კონსტანტინე დარსანია; born 29 May 1984) is a Georgian footballer who currently is a free agent. He was called up to the Abkhazia national football team in 2008.
