= Plamen Timnev =

Bulgarian footballer

Personal information
- Date of birth: 26 March 1973 (age 53)
- Place of birth: Varna, Bulgaria
- Height: 1.83 m (6 ft 0 in)
- Position: Forward

Youth career
- 1983–1990: Cherno More

Senior career*
Years	Team	Apps	(Gls)
1990–1994	Cherno More	102	(18)
1995–1997	Levski Sofia	35	(4)
1997–1998	Spartak Varna	25	(7)
1999	Chaves	8	(1)
1999–2000	Spartak Varna	28	(16)
2000–2004	Naftex	51	(20)
2004–2005	Cherno More	34	(11)
2006	Naftex	7	(0)
2007–2009	Lokomotiv Dryanovo	32	(13)
- * Club domestic league appearances and goals

Plamen Timnev (Bulgarian: Пламен Тимнев; born 26 March 1973) is a former Bulgarian footballer who played as a forward.

== Club career ==
Timnev spent almost his entire career in the top flight of Bulgarian football, establishing himself as one of Varna's football legends. He also had a short stint in Portugal in 1999. Outside of football, Timnev has been involved in various business ventures.
