= Lyubomir Nyagolov =

Bulgarian footballer

Personal information
- Date of birth: 8 March 1977 (age 49)
- Place of birth: Bulgaria
- Height: 1.70 m (5 ft 7 in)
- Position: Defender

Lyubomir Nyagolov (Bulgarian: Любомир Няголов) (born 8 March 1977) is a former Bulgarian footballer.

== Career ==
Over the course of his playing days, Nyagolov donned the colours of Vihar Aytos, Nesebar, Chernomorets Burgas, FC Ravda, Naftex and Lokomotiv (Stara Zagora).
