= Marko Ilić (footballer, born 1985) =

Serbian footballer

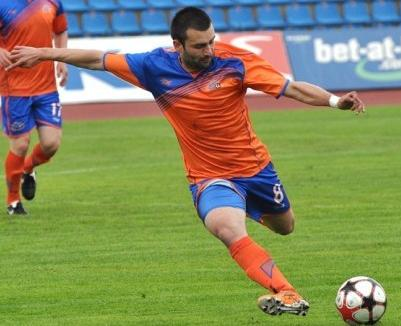

Personal information
- Date of birth: 9 May 1985 (age 41)
- Place of birth: Belgrade, SFR Yugoslavia
- Height: 1.77 m (5 ft 10 in)
- Position: Midfielder

Youth career
- Red Star Belgrade

Senior career*
Years	Team	Apps	(Gls)
2002–2004	OFK Beograd	11	(0)
2002–2003	→ Njegoš Lovćenac (loan)	7	(4)
2003–2004	→ Metalac Gornji Milanovac (loan)	13	(7)
2004–2005	Cherno More Varna	30	(2)
2006	Lokomotiv Plovdiv	11	(0)
2006	Botev Plovdiv	12	(3)
2007	Spartak Varna	14	(3)
2007	Bežanija	9	(2)
2008–2009	Beroe Stara Zagora	29	(6)
2010	Topolite	12	(8)
2011	Sliven 2000	13	(0)
2012	Srem	12	(0)
- * Club domestic league appearances and goals

Marko Ilić (Serbian Cyrillic: Марко Илић; born 9 May 1985) is a Serbian former professional footballer who played as a midfielder.
