= Petyo Dinkov =

Bulgarian footballer

Personal information
- Full name: Petyo Dimitrov Dinkov
- Date of birth: 8 December 1979 (age 46)
- Place of birth: Sofia, Bulgaria
- Height: 5 ft 10 in (1.78 m)
- Position: Midfielder

Team information
- Current team: Bansko
- Number: 19

Youth career
- Slavia Sofia

Senior career*
Years	Team	Apps	(Gls)
2004–2005	Slavia Sofia	5	(0)
2005–2007	Belasitsa Petrich	44	(2)
2007–2009	Minyor Pernik	26	(3)
2009–2010	Bansko	24	(3)
2010–2011	Vihren Sandanski	24	(1)
2011–	Bansko	12	(0)
- * Club domestic league appearances and goals as of 8 June 2012

Petyo Dinkov (Bulgarian: Петьо Динков) (born 8 December 1979 in Sofia) is a Bulgarian football midfielder who currently plays for Bansko.
