= Hristo Markov (footballer) =

Bulgarian footballer

Personal information
- Full name: Hristo Markov
- Date of birth: 11 November 1985 (age 40)
- Place of birth: Sofia, Bulgaria
- Height: 1.77 m (5 ft 10 in)
- Position: Midfielder

Youth career
- 1996–2003: Lokomotiv Sofia

Senior career*
| Years | Team | Apps | (Gls) |
| 2003–2008 | Lokomotiv Sofia | 55 | (6) |
| 2007 | Vidima-Rakovski Sevlievo | 7 | (0) |
| 2007–2009 | Chavdar Etropole | 23 | (5) |
| 2009–2010 | PFC Nesebar | 38 | (4) |
- * Club domestic league appearances and goals

Hristo Markov (Bulgarian: Христо Марков) (born 27 August 1985) is a Bulgarian footballer who played for PFC Nesebar as a midfielder.

He was raised in Lokomotiv Sofia's youth teams. So far he has played 53 games and scored 5 goals in the national championship.

In June 2007 he went on loan to PFC Vidima-Rakovski Sevlievo.

Six months later gone in Chavdar Etropole.
