= Pavlin Todorov =

Bulgarian footballer

Personal information
- Full name: Pavlin Ivanov Todorov
- Date of birth: 12 October 1983 (age 43)
- Place of birth: Bulgaria
- Height: 1.76 m (5 ft 9 in)
- Position: Forward

Senior career*
Years	Team	Apps	(Gls)
2005–2006	Pirin Blagoevgrad		
2006–2008	Kaliakra Kavarna		
2008–2009	Lyubimets 2007	12	(4)
2009–2012	Dobrudzha Dobrich	45	(9)
2012	Dunav Ruse	=	
2013	Kaliakra Kavarna	8	(0)
- * Club domestic league appearances and goals

Pavlin Ivanov Todorov (Bulgarian: Павлин Иванов Тодоров) (born 12 October 1983) is a Bulgarian former footballer who played as a forward. Todorov's older brother, Svetoslav, is a former professional footballer and current manager who made a name for himself playing club football for Litex Lovech and in England while also representing his national team.
