= Gosho Ginchev =

Bulgarian footballer

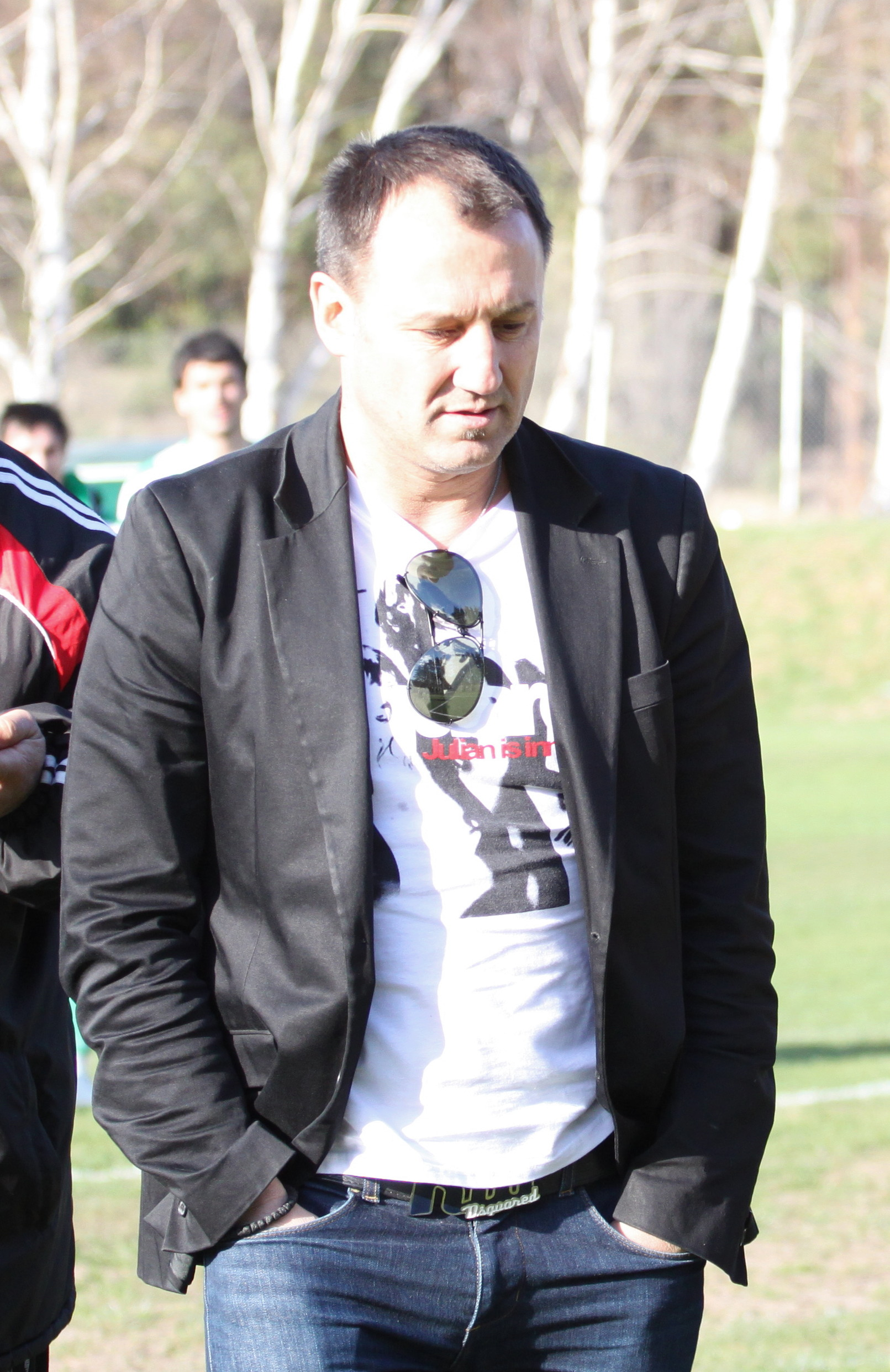

Personal information
- Full name: Gosho Petkov Ginchev
- Date of birth: 2 February 1969 (age 57)
- Place of birth: Madrets, Bulgaria
- Height: 1.80 m (5 ft 11 in)
- Position: Defender

Senior career*
Years	Team	Apps	(Gls)
1986–1992	Beroe Stara Zagora	158	(10)
1993–1995	Levski Sofia	61	(1)
1995–1996	Denizlispor	32	(0)
1996–2002	Antalyaspor	182	(10)
2002–2005	Cherno More	68	(9)
Total		501	(30)

International career
1989–1998	Bulgaria	19	(0)
- * Club domestic league appearances and goals

Gosho Petkov Ginchev (Bulgarian: Гошо Петков Гинчев; born 2 February 1969 in Madrets) is a former Bulgarian footballer who played as a defender.

He was capped for the Bulgaria national team, playing two games at the 1998 FIFA World Cup. He was also in the Bulgarian Euro 1996 squad.

== Club career ==
Ginchev began his playing career with Beroe Stara Zagora in the autumn of 1986 and joined the first team in 1987. He remained with Beroe until December 1992 before moving to Levski Sofia in the spring of 1993.

At Levski Sofia, he spent approximately two and a half years and won the Bulgarian league title three times. He also won the Bulgarian Cup during the 1993–94 season.

In 1995, he moved to Turkey to join Denizlispor, where he played during the 1995–96 season. In 1996, he transferred to fellow Turkish club Antalyaspor, where he remained until 2002.

Ginchev returned to Bulgaria in 2002 and joined Cherno More. He played for the club through the 2004–05 season and retired from professional football in 2005.

== International career ==
Ginchev represented the Bulgaria national team and was included in the squad for UEFA Euro 1996.

Ginchev also participated in the 1998 FIFA World Cup, held in France, playing in the group-stage matches against the Nigeria and the Spain. Bulgaria lost 1–0 to Nigeria and then suffered a 6–1 defeat against Spain. With a record of one draw and two defeats in the group stage, Bulgaria were eliminated from the tournament.

Ginchev made 19 appearances for the Bulgaria national team and scored no goals.

== Honours ==
=== Club ===
Levski Sofia

- A Group (3): 1992–93, 1993–94, 1994–95
- Bulgarian Cup: 1993–94
