= Rosen Emilov =

Bulgarian footballer (born 1977)

Personal information
- Date of birth: 3 August 1977 (age 49)
- Place of birth: Bulgaria
- Height: 1.80 m (5 ft 11 in)
- Position: Midfielder

Senior career*
Years	Team	Apps	(Gls)
1997–1999	Litex Lovech	32	(1)
1999	Beroe Stara Zagora	9	(0)
2000	CSKA Sofia	8	(0)
2000	Beroe Stara Zagora	8	(1)
2001	Slavia Sofia	4	(0)
2001–2002	Olimpik Teteven		
2002–2003	Adanaspor	15	(0)
2004	Cherno More		
2004–2005	Marek Dupnitsa		
2005	Spartak Pleven	10	(5)
2006	Dunav Ruse		
- Olimpik Teteven
- * Club domestic league appearances and goals

Rosen Emilov (Bulgarian: Росен Емилов; born 3 August 1977) is a former Bulgarian footballer who played as a midfielder.

== Biography ==
In his career, Emilov represented CSKA Sofia, Litex Lovech, Beroe, Slavia Sofia, Marek, Spartak Pleven, Olimpik Teteven and Dunav Ruse. During his time with Litex Lovech in the late 1990s, he was part of two title-winning teams, the first ones in the club's history. In the early 2000s, Emilov also had a spell in Turkey with Adanaspor.
