= Troyan Radulov =

Bulgarian footballer and coach

Personal information
- Full name: Troyan Krasimirov Radulov
- Date of birth: 4 February 1974 (age 52)
- Place of birth: Sofia, Bulgaria
- Height: 1.74 m (5 ft 8 1/2 in)
- Position: Midfielder

Senior career*
Years	Team	Apps	(Gls)
1993–1998	Septemvri Sofia	96	(26)
1996	→ Levski Kyustendil (loan)	11	(2)
1999–2001	Slavia Sofia	37	(2)
2001–2002	Conegliano German	23	(7)
2002–2006	Vidima-Rakovski	104	(10)
2006	Spartak Varna	12	(0)
2007–2011	Akademik Sofia	112	(7)
- * Club domestic league appearances and goals

Troyan Radulov (Bulgarian: Троян Радулов; born 4 February 1974) is a former Bulgarian footballer who played as a midfielder and is currently the Bulgarian women national team and the Bulgarian national women team u17 coach.

In his career Radulov played as a midfielder for Slavia Sofia, Vidima-Rakovski Sevlievo, Spartak Varna and Akademik Sofia in the Bulgarian A Professional Football Group.
