= Kuncho Kunchev =

Bulgarian footballer (born 1983)

Personal information
- Full name: Kuncho Mitkov Kunchev
- Date of birth: 27 June 1983 (age 43)
- Place of birth: Bulgaria
- Height: 1.81 m (5 ft 11 1/2 in)
- Position: Midfielder

Senior career*
Years	Team	Apps	(Gls)
2000–2004	Spartak Pleven	46	(1)
2004–2006	Cherno More	36	(0)
2006	→ Belite Orli (loan)		
2007–2008	Spartak Varna	37	(1)
2008	Prefab Modelu		
2010–2012	Nobody caps6 =		
- * Club domestic league appearances and goals

Kuncho Kunchev (Bulgarian: Кунчо Кунчев; born 27 June 1983) is a Bulgarian footballer who played as a midfielder.

Kunchev previously played for Cherno More Varna and Spartak Varna in the Bulgarian A PFG.
