= Zdravko Todorov =

Bulgarian footballer

Zdravko Todorov (Bulgarian: Здравко Тодоров; born 28 November 1982) is a Bulgarian footballer who plays as a striker. He was raised in Beroe Stara Zagora's youth teams. Born in Harmanli, he started his career in a local team, Hebros. At 16 years old Todorov went to play for PFC Beroe Stara Zagora. Between 2002 and 2004 he played for AKB Minyor from the town of Radnevo. In June 2004 he returned to Beroe.

- Height - 1.75 m.
- Weight - 72 kg.
