= Bulgaria national under-21 football team =

National association football team

Bulgaria U-21
- Nickname(s): Лъвчетата / Lavchetata (The Young Lions)
- Association: Bulgarian Football Union (BFU)
- Confederation: UEFA (Europe)
- Head coach: Todor Yanchev
- Captain: Nikola Iliev
- Most caps: Petar Mihtarski (51)
- Top scorer: Atanas Mihaylov (31)
- Home stadium: Various
- FIFA code: BUL
| First colours | Second colours |

The Bulgaria national under-21 football team (Bulgarian: Mладежки национален отбор на България по футбол) is considered to be the feeder team for the Bulgaria national football team. This team is for Bulgarian players aged under 21 at the start of the calendar year in which a two-year UEFA European Under-21 Championship campaign begins, so some players can remain with the squad until the age of 23.

== Competition results ==
Champions Runners-Up Semi-Finals Other Top Results

=== Balkan Youth Championship ===
| Year | Rank |
|---|---|
| (Greece) 1968 | Champions |
| (Bulgaria) 1970 | Champions |
| (Socialist Federal Republic of Yugoslavia) 1973 | Champions |

=== UEFA U-21 European Championship ===
| Year | Rank |
|---|---|
| (Europe) 1972 | Semi-Finals |
| (Europe) 1974 | Quarter-Finals |
| (Europe) 1976 | Quarter-Finals |
| (Europe) 1978 | Semi-Finals |
| (Europe) 1990 | Quarter-Finals |

==== UEFA Euro 2027 Qualifier ====
| Pos | Team | Pld | W | D | L | GF | GA | GD | Pts | Qualification | Portugal | Czech Republic | Scotland | Bulgaria | Azerbaijan | Gibraltar |
|---|---|---|---|---|---|---|---|---|---|---|---|---|---|---|---|---|
| 1 | Portugal | 10 | 8 | 1 | 1 | 35 | 2 | +33 | 25 | Final tournament | — | 2–0 | 3–0 | 3–0 | 5–0 | 4–0 |
| 2 | Czech Republic | 10 | 5 | 3 | 2 | 17 | 6 | +11 | 18 | Play-offs | 0–0 | — | 2–0 | 1–0 | 5–0 | 5–0 |
| 3 | Scotland | 10 | 5 | 2 | 3 | 25 | 12 | +13 | 17 | | 0–2 | 0–0 | — | 1–0 | 5–2 | 12–0 |
| 4 | Bulgaria | 10 | 4 | 2 | 4 | 9 | 10 | −1 | 14 | | 2–1 | 2–1 | 0–2 | — | 0–0 | 3–0 |
| 5 | Azerbaijan | 10 | 2 | 4 | 4 | 11 | 24 | −13 | 10 | | 0–4 | 1–1 | 3–3 | 1–1 | — | 3–0 |
| 6 | Gibraltar | 10 | 0 | 0 | 10 | 1 | 44 | −43 | 0 | | 0–11 | 1–2 | 0–2 | 0–1 | 0–1 | — |

Source: UEFA
Rules for classification: Tiebreakers

== Recent fixtures ==
Win Draw Loss

== Coaching staff ==
=== Current coaching staff ===
| Position | Staff |
|---|---|
| Manager | (Bulgaria) Todor Yanchev |
| Assistant manager | (Bulgaria) Stoycho Mladenov |
| Goalkeeper coach | (Bulgaria) Stoyan Kolev |
| Video Analyst | (Bulgaria) Martin Gardev |

Last updated: 20 December 2018
Source: https://bfunion.bg/news/45742/0

=== Manager history ===
| Tenure | Head Coach |
|---|---|
| 2000–2001 | (Bulgaria) Dimitar Aleksiev |
| 2000-2002 | (Bulgaria) Ivan Kolev |
| 2003–2006 | (Bulgaria) Petar Miladinov |
| 2006–2007 | (Bulgaria) Aleksandar Stankov |
| 2008–2009 | (Bulgaria) Ivan Kolev |
| 2010–2013 | (Bulgaria) Mihail Madanski |
| 2014–2018 | (Bulgaria) Antoni Zdravkov |
| 2018–2025 | (Bulgaria) Aleksandar Dimitrov |
| 2025– | (Bulgaria) Todor Yanchev |

== Players ==
=== Current squad ===
Players born in or after 2004 are eligible for the 2027 UEFA European Under-21 Championship.

The following players were called up for the 2027 UEFA European Under-21 Championship qualification Group B matches against Scotland on 18 November 2025.

Caps and goals correct as of 18 November 2025, after the match against Scotland.

| No. | Pos. | Player | Date of birth (age) | Caps | Goals | Club |
|---|---|---|---|---|---|---|
| 1 | GK | Plamen Andreev | 15 December 2004 (age 21) | 11 | 0 | (Hungarian Football Federation) Debreceni |
| 12 | GK | Aleksandar Andreev | 25 March 2006 (age 20) | 0 | 0 | (Royal Spanish Football Federation) Girona B |
| 2 | DF | Ivaylo Videv | 17 January 2006 (age 20) | 1 | 0 | (Bulgarian Football Union) Botev Plovdiv |
| 3 | DF | Simeon Vasilev | 24 October 2005 (age 21) | 5 | 0 | (Bulgarian Football Union) Arda |
| 4 | DF | Todor Pavlov | 31 July 2004 (age 22) | 5 | 0 | (Bulgarian Football Union) Lokomotiv Plovdiv |
| 5 | DF | Mihail Polendakov | 5 June 2007 (age 19) | 9 | 0 | (Bulgarian Football Union) Ludogorets Razgrad |
| 14 | DF | Teodor Ivanov | 13 March 2004 (age 22) | 10 | 0 | (Bulgarian Football Union) CSKA Sofia |
| 15 | DF | Dimitar Papazov | 15 July 2006 (age 20) | 12 | 0 | (Italian Football Federation) Perugia |
| 6 | MF | Ivan Pankov | 12 November 2005 (age 20) | 0 | 0 | (Cyprus Football Association) AEK Larnaca |
| 8 | MF | Antoan Stoyanov | 17 January 2005 (age 21) | 9 | 0 | (Bulgarian Football Union) Botev Vratsa |
| 10 | MF | Nikola Iliev | 6 June 2004 (age 22) | 20 | 8 | (Bulgarian Football Union) Botev Plovdiv |
| 16 | MF | Tsvetoslav Marinov | 4 August 2005 (age 21) | 5 | 0 | (Bulgarian Football Union) Spartak Varna |
| 20 | MF | Damyan Yordanov | 30 May 2005 (age 21) | 2 | 0 | (Saudi Arabian Football Federation) Al-Ula |
| 21 | MF | Petko Panayotov | 20 July 2005 (age 21) | 7 | 1 | (Bulgarian Football Union) CSKA Sofia |
| 22 | MF | Asen Mitkov | 17 February 2005 (age 21) | 12 | 1 | (Bulgarian Football Union) Levski Sofia |
| 7 | FW | Roberto Raychev | 7 May 2005 (age 21) | 23 | 1 | (Bulgarian Football Union) Slavia Sofia |
| 9 | FW | Borislav Rupanov | 30 November 2004 (age 21) | 13 | 2 | (Portuguese Football Federation) União de Leiria |
| 17 | FW | Boris Dimitrov | 29 March 2004 (age 22) | 9 | 1 | (Bulgarian Football Union) CSKA 1948 |
| 18 | FW | Kristiyan Balov | 26 July 2006 (age 20) | 7 | 0 | (Football Association of Serbia) Red Star Belgrade |
| 19 | FW | Nikolay Zlatev | 12 December 2004 (age 21) | 18 | 0 | (Qatar Football Association) Al Kharaitiyat |

=== Recent call ups ===
The following players have previously been called up to the Bulgaria under-21 squad in the last 12 months and remain eligible for selection.

| Pos. | Player | Date of birth (age) | Caps | Goals | Club | Latest call-up |

== See also ==
- Bulgaria national football team
- Bulgaria national under-17 football team
- Bulgaria national under-19 football team
- UEFA European Under-21 Championship
