= Danail Bachkov =

Bulgarian footballer and manager

Personal information
- Full name: Danail Vasilev Bachkov
- Date of birth: 21 December 1976 (age 49)
- Place of birth: Plovdiv, Bulgaria
- Height: 1.72 m (5 ft 7 1/2 in)
- Position: Right-back

Team information
- Current team: Levski Karlovo (head coach)

Youth career
- Spartak Plovdiv

Senior career*
Years	Team	Apps	(Gls)
1996–1998	Spartak Plovdiv	35	(3)
1998–2002	Lokomotiv Plovdiv	95	(7)
2002–2003	Levski Sofia	5	(0)
2003–2005	Cherno more	44	(0)
2005–2006	Spartak Plovdiv	21	(1)
2006–2007	Lokomotiv Plovdiv	24	(0)
2007–2009	Rodopa Smolyan	43	(1)
2009–2010	Sportist Svoge	15	(0)
Total		282	(12)

International career
2002	Bulgaria	2	(0)

Managerial career
- 2012–2017: Minyor Pernik (youth team)
- 2017: Minyor Pernik
- 2018–2019: Belasitsa Petrich
- 2020–: Levski Karlovo
- * Club domestic league appearances and goals

Danail Bachkov (Bulgarian: Данаил Бачков; born 21 December 1976) is a former Bulgarian professional footballer who played as a right-back and a football manager who currently manages Levski Karlovo. Bachkov was capped two times for the Bulgarian national team.

== Coaching career ==
On 16 June 2017, Bachkov was appointed as manager of Third League club Minyor Pernik He was sacked in November following a streak of poor results.

== Honours ==
- Levski Sofia
  - Bulgarian Cup (1): 2003
