= Yordan Linkov =

Bulgarian footballer

Personal information
- Full name: Yordan Georgiev Linkov
- Date of birth: 26 January 1978 (age 48)
- Place of birth: Pazardzhik, Bulgaria
- Height: 1.88 m (6 ft 2 in)
- Position: Goalkeeper

Youth career
- Hebar Pazardzhik

Senior career*
Years	Team	Apps	(Gls)
1996–1998	Botev Plovdiv	40	(0)
1998–2001	Spartak Pleven	44	(0)
2001	Botev Plovdiv	5	(0)
2002–2003	Akademik Svishtov	17	(0)
2003–2005	Nesebar	48	(0)
2005–2006	Vihren Sandanski	19	(0)
2006–2007	Cherno More	2	(0)
2007	Naftex Burgas	10	(0)
2008	Rodopa Smolyan	2	(0)
2008–2009	Olympiakos Nicosia	0	(0)
2009–2010	Lokomotiv Mezdra	9	(0)
2010–2011	Brestnik 1948	28	(0)
2011–2012	Oborishte	35	(0)

International career
2005	Bulgaria	1	(0)
- * Club domestic league appearances and goals

Yordan Linkov (Bulgarian: Йордан Линков; born 26 January 1978) is a former Bulgarian footballer who played as a goalkeeper.
