= Marin Petrov =

Bulgarian footballer

Personal information
- Full name: Marin Krasimirov Petrov
- Date of birth: 7 August 1977 (age 49)
- Place of birth: Varna, Bulgaria
- Height: 1.80 m (5 ft 11 in)
- Position: Midfielder

Youth career
- Spartak Varna

Senior career*
Years	Team	Apps	(Gls)
1997–1998	Spartak Varna	24	(2)
1998–2002	Litex Lovech	80	(15)
2002–2003	Cherno More	14	(1)
2003–2005	Naftex Burgas	5	(0)
2005–2006	Ethnikos Piraeus	27	(4)
2006–2007	Kallithea	15	(0)
2007	Fostiras	6	(1)
2008	Ethnikos Piraeus	5	(0)
2008–2009	Chernomorets Burgas	11	(2)
2010	Sportist Svoge	9	(1)
2010	Topolite	13	(5)
2011–2012	Spartak Varna	26	(3)
2012	Lokomotiv Plovdiv	6	(1)
Total		241	(35)
- * Club domestic league appearances and goals

Marin Petrov (Bulgarian: Марин Петров; born 7 August 1977) is a Bulgarian former professional footballer who played as a midfielder. He won one A PFG title and one Bulgarian Cup at club level, playing for 11 different teams in Bulgaria and Greece throughout his career.

== Career ==
Petrov began his professional career for Spartak Varna in 1997. He also played for Litex Lovech, Cherno More, Naftex Burgas, Ethnikos Piraeus, Kallithea, Fostiras, Chernomorets Burgas, Sportist Svoge and FC Topolite. Petrov made his final appearance in his career for Lokomotiv Plovdiv, in a 0–0 draw against Litex Lovech for Bulgarian Cup on 31 October 2012, coming on as a substitute. On 13 January 2013, Petrov announced his retirement from football.

== Honours ==
Litex Lovech

- Bulgarian A PFG: 1998–99
- Bulgarian Cup: 2001
