= Dian Genchev =

Bulgarian footballer (born 1975)

Personal information
- Full name: Dian Todorov Genchev
- Date of birth: 8 February 1975 (age 51)
- Place of birth: Varna, Bulgaria
- Height: 1.78 m (5 ft 10 in)
- Position: Attacking midfielder

Team information
- Current team: Olympic Varna (youth coach)

Youth career
- Spartak Varna

Senior career*
Years	Team	Apps	(Gls)
1994–1995	Avtotrade Aksakovo		
1995–1998	Spartak Varna	71	(7)
1998–2002	Lokomotiv Sofia	93	(8)
2002–2003	Kalamata	24	(5)
2003–2007	Cherno More	82	(7)
2007	Astana	10	(0)
2008–2011	Beroe	82	(4)
2012	Nesebar	8	(0)
2015–2016	Inter Plachidol		
Total		370	(31)

Managerial career
- 2016–2017: Spartak 1918 (youth coach)
- 2017–: Olympic Varna (youth coach)
- * Club domestic league appearances and goals as of 6 December 2011

Dian Todorov Genchev (Bulgarian: Диан Генчев; born 8 February 1975) is a Bulgarian retired footballer and now youth coach at Olympic Varna. He played as a playmaker who can play well both as an attacking central midfielder.

== Career ==
Dido as he is known among the supporters in Bulgaria, started his career in home town Varna, playing for local side Spartak.

He became one of the best midfielders in the country very soon and attracted the attention of one of the elite clubs from Sofia – Lokomotiv.

In season 2002–03 Genchev played for Kalamata in Greece. In June 2003 he returned to Bulgaria, signing a contract with Cherno More Varna.

In 2007–08, for six months, Genchev played in Kazakhstan Premier League for Astana.

From January 2008 he was part of the Beroe Stara Zagora team, officially joining them in February 2008. He left the team in late 2011 to join Nesebar until end of the season. After that he announced his retirement.

In the summer of 2015 he come back from retirement to join the newly joined to V Group team Inter Plachidol.

In 2016, together with other retired footballers, he establimished the football academy Olympic Varna.

== Statistic ==
Season	Team	League		
Season	Team	League	Appearance	Goals
1995–96	Spartak Varna	A PFG	21	1
1996–97	Spartak Varna	A PFG	26	3
1997–98	Spartak Varna	A PFG	24	3
1998–99	Lokomotiv Sofia	A PFG	19	1
1999–00	Lokomotiv Sofia	A PFG	24	5
2000–01	Lokomotiv Sofia	A PFG	20	0
2001–02	Lokomotiv Sofia	A PFG	30	2
2002–03	Kalamata	Beta Ethniki	24	5
2003–04	Cherno More	A PFG	27	2
2004–05	Cherno More	A PFG	23	1
2005–06	Cherno More	A PFG	15	3
2006–07	Cherno More	A PFG	17	1
2007–08	Astana	Kazakhstan Premier League	10	0
2007–08	Beroe	A PFG	11	0
2008–09	Beroe	B PFG	22	2
2009–10	Beroe	A PFG	24	2

== Honours ==
=== Club ===
- Cherno More
  - Bulgarian Cup:
    - Runner-up: 2005–06
- Beroe
  - Bulgarian Cup:
    - Winner: 2009–10
