= Nikolay Filipov =

Bulgarian footballer

Personal information
- Full name: Nikolay Nikolov Filipov
- Date of birth: 14 February 1976 (age 50)
- Place of birth: Varna, Bulgaria
- Height: 1.70 m (5 ft 7 in)
- Position: Winger

Senior career*
Years	Team	Apps	(Gls)
1992–1998	Cherno More	110	(15)
1998–2001	Spartak Varna	59	(9)
2001–2002	Dobrudzha		
2003–2005	Rodopa Smolyan		
2005–2006	Spartak Varna	41	(8)
2007–2008	Volov Shumen		
- * Club domestic league appearances and goals

Nikolay Filipov (born 14 February 1976) is a former Bulgarian professional footballer who played as a winger. He ended his career at the end of 2007–08 season at age 32.
