= Konstantin Mirchev =

Bulgarian footballer

Personal information
- Full name: Konstantin Svetlinov Mirchev
- Date of birth: 24 July 1978 (age 48)
- Place of birth: Sofia, Bulgaria
- Height: 1.77 m (5 ft 9 1/2 in)
- Position: Midfielder

Youth career
- CSKA Sofia

Senior career*
Years	Team	Apps	(Gls)
1997–1999	Etar Veliko Tarnovo	27	(0)
1999–2000	FC Shumen	11	(3)
2000	CSKA Sofia	12	(0)
2001	Spartak Varna	25	(9)
2002	CSKA Sofia	4	(0)
2002–2003	Cherno More	35	(4)
2004	CSKA Sofia	4	(0)
2004–2008	Cherno More	89	(16)
2008–2010	Omonia Aradippou	48	(24)
2010–2011	Onisilos Sotira	21	(5)
2012	Botev Vratsa	7	(1)
2012	Lokomotiv Plovdiv	1	(0)
- * Club domestic league appearances and goals as of 8 November 2012

Konstantin Svetlinov Mirchev (Bulgarian: Константин Светлинов Мирчев; born 24 July 1978) is a Bulgarian footballer who last played as a midfielder for Lokomotiv Plovdiv. His first club was CSKA Sofia.

== Career ==
He was a midfielder for Cypriot club Omonia Aradippou in 2008-2009 and 2009-2010. He was the leading scorer for Omonia for both seasons.

Bulgarian football star Dimitar Berbatov, Mirchev's former teammate at CSKA, cited Mirchev when asked to name his closest friends. He said Mirchev was a staunch supporter of Berbatov's decision to retire from the national team in May 2010.
