= 2005–06 PFC Cherno More Varna season =

Bulgarian A Group football team

Cherno More
2005–06 season
- Chairman: Krasen Kralev
- Manager: Yasen Petrov (from 13 March 2006); Ilian Iliev (until 5 March 2006)
- A Group: 8th
- Bulgarian Cup: Runners-up (knocked out by CSKA Sofia)
- Top goalscorer: Georgi Vladimirov (7)
- Biggest win: 4–0 (vs Belasitsa, 17 Sep 2005); 4–0 (vs Beroe, 16 May 2006)
- Biggest defeat: 5–2 (vs Litex, 10 Sep 2005)
Home colours	Away colours

This page covers all relevant details regarding PFC Cherno More Varna for all official competitions inside the 2005–06 season. These are A Group and Bulgarian Cup.

== Transfers ==
=== Summer transfer window ===
In:

No.	Pos.	Nation	Player
—	GK	BUL	Karamfil Ilchev (from Dobrudzha)
—	DF	BUL	Atanas Pashkulev (from Septemvri Sofia)
—	DF	BUL	Yanko Kosturkov (from Pirin Blagoevgrad)
—	DF	BUL	Aleksandar Aleksandrov (from Chernomorets Burgas)
—	DF	SCG	Miroslav Milošević (from (Cyprus) Alki Larnaca)
—	MF	BUL	Martin Hristov (from Svetkavitsa)
—	MF	BUL	Slavi Zhekov (from Beroe)
—	MF	BRA	Daniel Morales (from Lokomotiv Plovdiv)
—	FW	BUL	Georgi Vladimirov (from Slavia Sofia)
—	FW	BUL	Emil Todorov (from Marek)

Out:

No.	Pos.	Nation	Player
—	GK	BUL	Zhivko Gerasimov (released)
—	DF	BUL	Danail Bachkov (to Spartak Plovdiv)
—	DF	BUL	Gosho Ginchev (retired)
—	DF	GEO	Vladimir Kakashvili (to (Georgia (country)) Ameri Tbilisi)
—	MF	BUL	Yordan Terziev (to Vidima-Rakovski)
—	MF	BUL	Dimitar Georgiev (to Marek)
—	MF	BUL	Nikolay Stankov (to Nesebar)
—	MF	GEO	Konstantine Darsania (to (Georgia (country)) Ameri Tbilisi)
—	FW	BUL	Todor Simov (loan return to Levski Sofia)

=== Winter transfer window ===
In:

No.	Pos.	Nation	Player
—	DF	GNB	Adelino Lopes (from (Sweden) Assyriska)
—	MF	POR	André Marqueiro (from (Portugal) Sporting Pombal)
—	MF	GNB	Inzaghi Donígio (on loan from (Portugal) Benfica)
—	MF	GNB	Adilson Cassamá (on loan from (Portugal) União da Madeira)
—	FW	BRA	Marcos da Silva (from (Czech Republic) Slavia Prague)
—	FW	BUL	Todor Simov (from Vidima-Rakovski)
—	FW	COD	Masena Moke (from (United Arab Emirates) Dubay Kauchers)

Out:

No.	Pos.	Nation	Player
—	DF	BUL	Detelin Dimitrov (to Dobrudzha)
—	MF	SCG	Marko Ilić (to Lokomotiv Plovdiv)
—	MF	BUL	Kuncho Kunchev (released)
—	MF	BUL	Ivan Georgiev (released)
—	FW	BUL	Plamen Timnev (to Naftex Burgas)
—	FW	BUL	Emil Todorov (to Beroe)

== Squad and league statistics ==
Goalkeepers
1	(Bulgaria) Karamfil Ilchev	0	(0)
22	(Bulgaria) Ivaylo Petrov	13	(0)
33	(Bulgaria) Krasimir Kolev	16	(0)

Defenders
5	(Bulgaria) Veselin Vachev	24	(2)
7	(Bulgaria) Yanko Kosturkov	20	(1)
15	(Bulgaria) Aleksandar Aleksandrov	21	(1)
20	(Bulgaria) Stanislav Stoyanov	23	(0)
23	(Serbia and Montenegro) Miroslav Milošević	20	(1)
24	(Bulgaria) Atanas Pashkulev	1	(0)
25	(Guinea-Bissau) Adelino Lopes	11	(0)
	(Bulgaria) Detelin Dimitrov*	8	(0)

Midfielders
6	(Guinea-Bissau) Adilson Cassamá	6	(0)
8	(Bulgaria) Martin Hristov	18	(1)
10	(Bulgaria) Konstantin Mirchev	12	(0)
13	(Bulgaria) Diyan Genchev	15	(3)
14	(Bulgaria) Slavi Zhekov	25	(3)
16	(Bulgaria) Vladko Kostadinov	5	(0)
17	(Portugal) André Marqueiro	1	(0)
18	(Bulgaria) Petar Kostadinov	25	(2)
21	(Guinea-Bissau) Inzaghi Donígio	14	(1)
32	(Brazil) Daniel Morales	8	(1)
	(Serbia and Montenegro) Marko Ilić*	9	(0)
	(Bulgaria) Kuncho Kunchev*	8	(0)
	(Bulgaria) Ivan Georgiev*	10	(1)

Forwards
9	(Bulgaria) Todor Simov	13	(1)
11	(Bulgaria) Georgi Vladimirov	26	(7)
19	(Democratic Republic of the Congo) Masena Moke	5	(2)
28	(Brazil) Marcos da Silva	8	(0)
	(Bulgaria) Plamen Timnev*	11	(1)
	(Bulgaria) Emil Todorov*	13	(1)

Manager
(Bulgaria) Yasen Petrov

- Dimitrov, Ilić, Kunchev, I. Georgiev, Timnev and E. Todorov left the club during a season.

== Matches ==
=== A Group ===
7 August 2005 Round 1	Rodopa Smolyan	0 – 1	Cherno More	Smolyan
18:00 EEST			D. Genchev 75'	Stadium: Septemvri; Attendance: 2,500

13 August 2005 Round 2	Cherno More	1 – 0	Slavia Sofia	Varna
18:00 EEST	P. Kostadinov 18'; Vachev (yellow card); E. Todorov (yellow card)	report		Stadium: Ticha; Attendance: 4,000

21 August 2005 Round 3	Vihren Sandanski	2 – 1	Cherno More	Sandanski
18:00 EEST	Bachev 37'; Furtado 80'; Furtado (yellow card); Udoji (yellow card); M. Markov (yellow card)	report	Timnev 57'; Stoyanov (yellow card); D. Dimitrov (yellow card); Milošević (yellow card)	Stadium: Sandanski; Attendance: 4,000

27 August 2005 Round 4	Cherno More	2 – 0	Botev Plovdiv	Varna
18:00 EEST	Vachev 68'; Vladimirov 77'; Timnev (yellow card); Mirchev (yellow card)	report	Saidhodzha (yellow card)	Stadium: Ticha; Attendance: 5,000

10 September 2005 Round 5	Litex Lovech	5 – 2	Cherno More	Lovech
19:00 EEST	Caillet 4'; Zlatinov 30'; Sandrinho 50', 75'; Novaković 90+2'; R. Popov (yellow card); Berberović (yellow card)	report	Vachev 49'; Vladimirov 51'; Mirchev (yellow card); Timnev (red card) 87'	Stadium: Lovech; Attendance: 600

17 September 2005 Round 6	Cherno More	4 – 0	Belasitsa Petrich	Varna
17:00 EEST	Milošević 3'; Vladimirov 31', 72'; E. Todorov 85'; Zhekov (yellow card); Vachev (yellow card)	report	G. Petrov (yellow card); Diano (yellow card)	Stadium: Ticha; Attendance: 2,000

24 September 2005 Round 7	Lokomotiv Plovdiv	2 – 0	Cherno More	Plovdiv
17:00 EEST	Kamburov 11', 85'; R. Petrov (yellow card)	report	Stoyanov (yellow card); Vladimirov (yellow card)	Stadium: Lokomotiv; Attendance: 4,000

2 October 2005 Round 8	Cherno More	0 – 1	Levski Sofia	Varna
15:00 EEST		report	E. Angelov 78'; Borimirov (yellow card); Telkiyski (yellow card)	Stadium: Ticha; Attendance: 8,500; Referee: Dimitar Dimitrov (Sofia)

15 October 2005 Round 9	Naftex Burgas	1 – 0	Cherno More	Burgas
18:00 EEST	Krastev 67'; Mica (yellow card); D. Hristov (yellow card)	report	Stoyanov (yellow card) (yellow-red card)	Stadium: Lazur; Attendance: 1,000

22 October 2005 Round 10	Cherno More	3 – 1	Pirin 1922	Varna
16:00 EEST	Kosturkov 16'; D. Genchev 45' (pen.); I. Georgiev 57'; Kosturkov (yellow card); E. Todorov (red card)	report	Shopov 73'; G. Georgiev (yellow card); Vitanov (yellow card)	Stadium: Ticha; Attendance: 2,000

29 October 2005 Round 11	CSKA Sofia	3 – 0	Cherno More	Sofia
19:30 EEST	Gargorov 33'; Yurukov 58'; V. Dimitrov 90+3'; Jakirović (yellow card); Y. Todorov (yellow card)	report	P. Kostadinov (yellow card); Kosturkov (yellow card)	Stadium: Balgarska Armia; Attendance: 2,000

5 November 2005 Round 12	Cherno More	0 – 0	Beroe Stara Zagora	Varna
14:30 EEST	M. Hristov (yellow card)	report	Džaferović (yellow card)	Stadium: Ticha; Attendance: 1,200

Round 13	v

26 November 2005 Round 14	Marek Dupnitsa	1 – 1	Cherno More	Dupnitsa
14:30 EEST	I. Iliev 77'; Krastovchev (yellow card)	report	Zhekov 35'; Kr. Kolev (yellow card); P. Kostadinov (yellow card); Vladimirov (yellow card)	Stadium: Bonchuk; Attendance: 1,000

3 December 2005 Round 15	Cherno More	0 – 2	Lokomotiv Sofia	Varna
14:00 EEST	Stoyanov (yellow card); Mirchev (yellow card); Vachev (yellow card); Ilić (yellow card)	report	Karadzhinov 73'; Dafchev 86'; Genkov (yellow card); Dafchev (yellow card); Sv. Petrov (yellow card); Karadzhinov (yellow card)	Stadium: Ticha; Attendance: 500

4 March 2006 Round 16	Cherno More	0 – 1	Rodopa Smolyan	Varna
14:00 EEST	Simov (yellow card)	report	D. Rusev 61'; Dyakov (yellow card); V. Vasilev (yellow card)	Stadium: Ticha; Attendance: 3,000; Referee: Angel Bekyarov (Plovdiv)

11 March 2006 Round 17	Slavia Sofia	1 – 0	Cherno More	Sofia
15:30 EEST	Ivanović 63'; Y. Petkov (yellow card); Mechedzhiev (yellow card); R. Rangelov (yellow card); Karaslavov (yellow card)	report	Aleksandrov (yellow card); Inzaghi (yellow card)	Stadium: Slavia; Attendance: 300; Referee: Momchil Vraykov (Pleven)

19 March 2006 Round 18	Cherno More	3 – 1	Vihren Sandanski	Varna
15:30 EEST	Kostadinov 37'; M. Hristov 60'; Morales 69' (pen.); Aleksandrov (yellow card); D. Genchev (yellow card); Morales (yellow card); M. Hristov (yellow card)	report	Stoynev 77'; Udoji (yellow card); Simonović (yellow card); Sofroniev (yellow card); Pinha (yellow card) (yellow-red card)	Stadium: Ticha; Attendance: 1,500; Referee: Sevgin Adem (Burgas)

25 March 2006 Round 19	Botev Plovdiv	0 – 0	Cherno More	Plovdiv
15:30 EEST	V. Vasilev (yellow card); Milenov (yellow card); St. Kostadinov (yellow card)		A. Lopes (yellow card)	Stadium: Hristo Botev; Attendance: 5,000; Referee: Stoyan Aleksiev (Sofia)

2 April 2006 Round 20	Cherno More	1 – 1	Litex Lovech	Varna
16:00 EEST	Inzaghi 77'; A. Lopes (yellow card); Vachev (yellow card); Zhekov (yellow card); Vladimirov (yellow card)		Sandrinho 71'; Zanev (yellow card); Zhelev (yellow card); Zlatinov (yellow card); Berberović (yellow card)	Stadium: Ticha; Attendance: 3,500; Referee: Stanislav Todorov (Shumen)

8 April 2006 Round 21	Belasitsa Petrich	0 – 0	Cherno More	Petrich
17:00 EEST	Marquinhos (yellow card); A. Kostadinov (yellow card); V. Ivanov (yellow card)		Kr. Kolev (yellow card); A. Lopes (yellow card); Kosturkov (yellow card); Vl. Kostadinov (yellow card); M. Hristov (yellow card)	Stadium: Tsar Samuil; Attendance: 3,000; Referee: Krasimir Yosifov (Veliko Tarnovo)

15 April 2006 Round 22	Cherno More	0 – 0	Lokomotiv Plovdiv	Varna
18:00 EEST	Kosturkov (yellow card)	report	Kr. Dimitrov (yellow card); Elame (yellow card)	Stadium: Ticha; Attendance: 4,000

19 April 2006 Round 23	Levski Sofia	3 – 1	Cherno More	Sofia
19:30 EEST	Bardon 7'; Borimirov 16'; St. Angelov 74'; Topuzakov (yellow card)		Zhekov 27'; M. da Silva (yellow card); M. Hristov (yellow card); Stoyanov (yellow card)	Stadium: Georgi Asparuhov; Attendance: 4,500; Referee: Hristo Ristoskov (Sandanski)

23 April 2006 Round 24	Cherno More	1 – 0	Naftex Burgas	Varna
17:00 EEST	Vladimirov 37'; A. Lopes (yellow card); Vachev (yellow card); Vladimirov (yellow card)		Krastev (yellow card); Starokin (yellow card); Tsenov (yellow card)	Stadium: Ticha; Attendance: 2,500; Referee: Ventsislav Koznichki

29 April 2006 Round 25	Pirin 1922	0 – 1	Cherno More	Blagoevgrad
17:00 EEST	Sv. Dyakov (yellow card); Manolev (yellow card)		Aleksandrov 52'; Inzaghi (yellow card)	Stadium: Hristo Botev; Attendance: 800; Referee: Krasimir Yosifov

6 May 2006 Round 26	Cherno More	0 – 0	CSKA Sofia	Varna
16:00 EEST	Vachev (yellow card); Simov (yellow card)		Y. Todorov (yellow card); Yurukov (yellow card)	Stadium: Ticha; Attendance: 9,000; Referee: Hristo Ristoskov (Sandanski)

16 May 2006 Round 27	Beroe Stara Zagora	0 – 4	Cherno More	Stara Zagora
18:00 EEST	Tanchovski (yellow card); Zhelev (yellow card)		Moke 50'; Simov 76'; Vladimirov 84', 88'	Stadium: Beroe; Attendance: 800; Referee: Angel Bekyarov

Round 28	v

28 May 2006 Round 29	Cherno More	2 – 0	Marek Dupnitsa	Varna
18:00 EEST	Moke 30' (pen.); Zhekov 57'; Inzaghi (yellow card)		Koemdzhiev (yellow card); Sv. Georgiev (yellow card)	Stadium: Ticha; Attendance: 2,200; Referee: Ivaylo Bozev

31 May 2006 Round 30	Lokomotiv Sofia	2 – 1	Cherno More	Sofia
18:00 EEST	Antunović 49'; Paskov 78' (pen.)		D. Genchev 87' (pen.)	Stadium: Lokomotiv; Attendance: 700; Referee: Krasimir Yosifov

==== League table ====
Pos	Team	Pld	W	D	L	GF	GA	GD	Pts
6	Belasitsa Petrich	28	11	6	11	33	33	0	39
7	Slavia Sofia	28	12	3	13	33	34	−1	39
8	Cherno More	28	10	7	11	29	27	+2	37
9	Vihren	28	10	2	16	35	55	−20	32
10	Beroe	28	8	8	12	36	53	−17	32

Source: A PFG (in Bulgarian)
Rules for classification: 1st points; 2nd head-to-head points; 3rd head-to-head goal difference; 4th head-to-head goals scored; 5th head-to-head away goals scored; 6th goal difference; 7th goals scored; 8th "sportsmanship" (R & Y cards); 9th draw

==== Results summary ====
Overall								Home						Away					
Pld	W	D	L	GF	GA	GD	Pts	W	D	L	GF	GA	GD	W	D	L	GF	GA	GD
28	10	7	11	29	27	+2	37	7	4	3	17	7	+10	3	3	8	12	20	−8

==== League performance ====
Round	1	2	3	4	5	6	7	8	9	10	11	12	13	14	15	16	17	18	19	20	21	22	23	24	25	26	27	28	29	30
Ground	A	H	A	H	A	H	A	H	A	H	A	H		A	H	H	A	H	A	H	A	H	A	H	A	H	A		H	A
Result	W	W	L	W	L	W	L	L	L	W	L	D	B	D	L	L	L	W	D	D	D	D	L	W	W	D	W	B	W	L
Position	7	4	5	4	6	4	5	5	7	6	7	7	8	7	7	8	11	8	10	9	9	10	10	9	7	7	6	7	6	8

A = Away; H = Home; B = Bye; W = Win; D = Draw; L = Loss

==== Goalscorers in A Group ====
Rank	Scorer	Goals
1	(Bulgaria) Georgi Vladimirov	7
2	(Bulgaria) Diyan Genchev	3
2	(Bulgaria) Slavi Zhekov	3
4	(Bulgaria) Petar Kostadinov	2
4	(Bulgaria) Veselin Vachev	2
4	(Democratic Republic of the Congo) Masena Moke	2
7	(Bulgaria) Plamen Timnev	1
7	(Serbia and Montenegro) Miroslav Milošević	1
7	(Bulgaria) Emil Todorov	1
7	(Bulgaria) Yanko Kosturkov	1
7	(Bulgaria) Martin Hristov	1
7	(Brazil) Daniel Morales	1
7	(Bulgaria) Ivan Georgiev	1
7	(Bulgaria) Todor Simov	1
7	(Guinea-Bissau) Inzaghi Donígio	1
7	(Bulgaria) Aleksandar Aleksandrov	1

=== Bulgarian Cup ===
22 March 2006 3rd Round	Cherno More	3 – 2 (a.e.t.)	Levski Sofia	Varna
14:30 EEST	M. Hristov 24'; P. Kostadinov 37'; Vachev 105'; Stoyanov (yellow card); Zhekov (yellow card); Vladimirov (yellow card); Morales (yellow card) (yellow-red card)		E. Angelov 57'; G. Ivanov 69'; Borimirov (yellow card); Yovov (yellow card); Bardon (yellow card)	Stadium: Ticha; Attendance: 10,500; Referee: Dimitar Dimitrov (Sofia)

12 April 2006 Quarter-final	Vihren Sandanski	0 – 2 (a.e.t.)	Cherno More	Sandanski
16:00 EEST				Stadium: Sandanski

3 May 2006 Semi-final	Shumen	1 – 2 (a.e.t.)	Cherno More	Shumen
16:00 EEST	Hristiyanov 25'; Grigorov (yellow card); Mihaylov (yellow card); Hikmet (yellow card); Borisov (yellow card); Yankov (yellow card)		Moke 10'; P. Kostadinov 95'; Inzaghi (yellow card); P. Kostadinov (yellow card)	Stadium: Panayot Volov; Attendance: 8,500; Referee: Dimitar Dimitrov (Sofia)

24 May 2006 Final	CSKA Sofia	3 – 1	Cherno More	Sofia
17:30 EEST	Gargorov 12', 28'; Dah Zadi 34'; Hdiouad (yellow card) 55'; Dah Zadi (yellow card) 86'		Moke 90+3'; A. Lopes (yellow card) 43'	Stadium: Vasil Levski; Attendance: 7,216; Referee: Santiago Rodríguez(Spain)
