= 2006 Bulgarian Cup final =

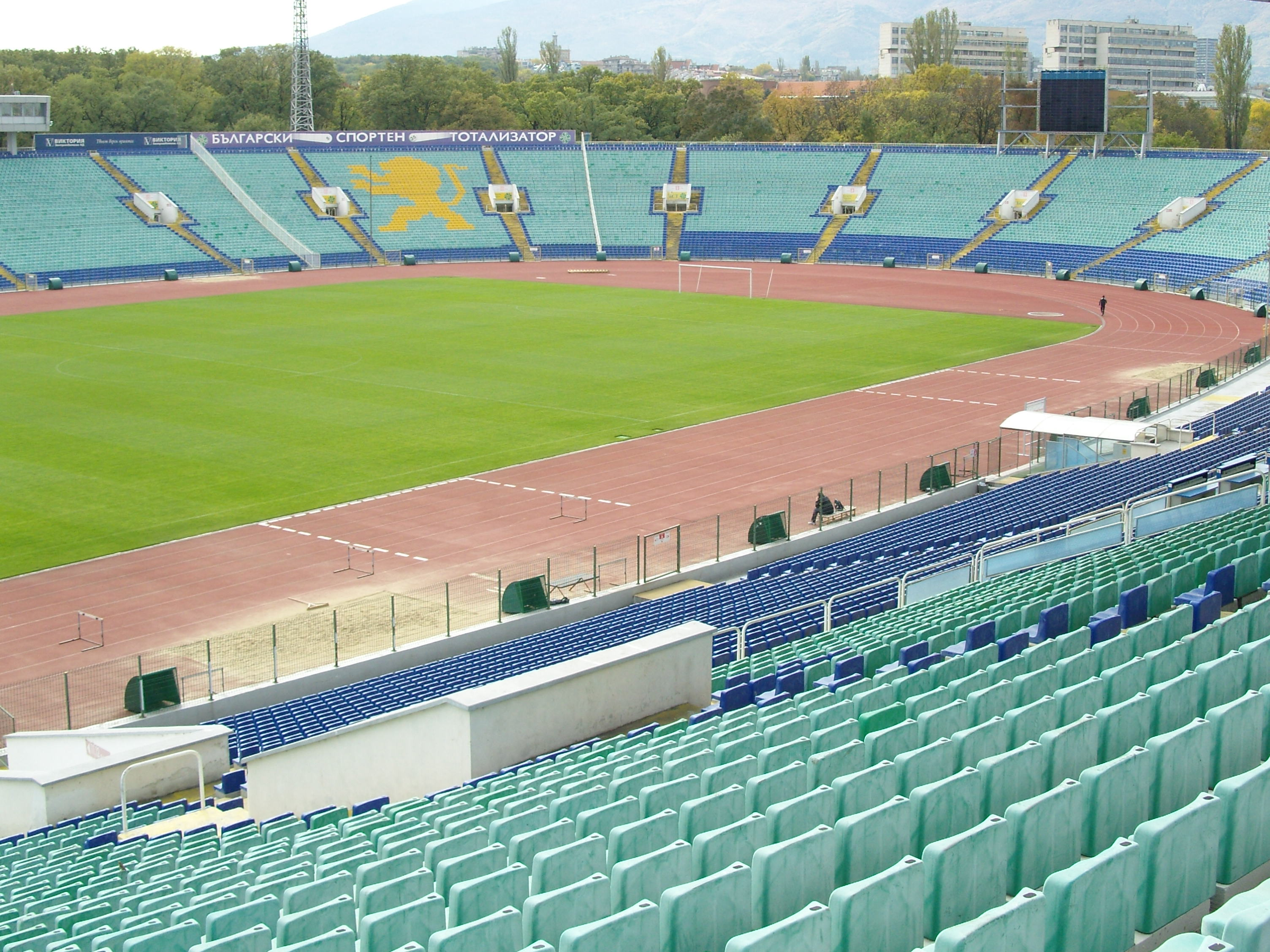
- Event: 2005–06 Bulgarian Cup
CSKA Sofia	Cherno More Varna
A Group	A Group
3	1
- Date: 24 May 2006
- Venue: Vasil Levski National Stadium, Sofia
- Referee: Santiago Rodríguez (Spain)
- Attendance: 7,216

The 2006 Bulgarian Cup final was the 66th final of the Bulgarian Cup. The match took place on 24 May 2006 at Vasil Levski National Stadium in Sofia. The match was contested by CSKA Sofia, who beat Naftex Burgas 4–1 in their semi-final, and Cherno More Varna who beat Volov Shumen 2–1 after extra time. CSKA won the final 3–1.

== Match ==
=== Details ===
24 May 2006
17:30 EEST

CSKA Sofia	3–1	Cherno More
Gargorov 12', 28'; Dah Zadi 34'		Moke 90+3'

Vasil Levski, Sofia
Attendance: 7,216
Referee: Santiago Rodríguez (Spain)

CSKA Sofia	Cherno More

CSKA:
GK	22	(Bulgaria) Ilko Pirgov
DF	14	(Bulgaria) Valentin Iliev
DF	3	(Bulgaria) Aleksandar Tunchev
DF	5	(Bulgaria) Kiril Kotev (substituted off) 63'
MF	6	(Bosnia and Herzegovina) Sergej Jakirović (substituted off) 80'
MF	30	(Bulgaria) Yordan Todorov
MF	27	(Brazil) Tiago Silva
MF	18	(Morocco) Mourad Hdiouad (yellow card) 55'
MF	23	(Bulgaria) Emil Gargorov (c)
FW	8	(Bulgaria) Velizar Dimitrov (substituted off) 75'
FW	11	(Ivory Coast) Guillaume Dah Zadi (yellow card) 86'
Substitutes:
GK	12	(Bulgaria) Ivaylo Petrov
MF	7	(Bulgaria) Hristo Yanev (substituted in) 75'
MF	10	(Bulgaria) Georgi Iliev (substituted in) 80'
DF	15	(North Macedonia) Robert Petrov
MF	20	(Bulgaria) Yordan Yurukov
DF	25	(Bulgaria) Ivan Ivanov (substituted in) 63'
FW	77	(Cape Verde) José Furtado
Manager:
(Bulgaria) Plamen Markov

Cherno More:
GK	33	(Bulgaria) Krasimir Kolev
DF	20	(Bulgaria) Stanislav Stoyanov
DF	23	(Serbia and Montenegro) Miša Milošević
DF	25	(Guinea-Bissau) Adelino Lopes (yellow card) 43'
DF	5	(Bulgaria) Veselin Vachev (c)
MF	32	(Brazil) Daniel Morales
MF	14	(Bulgaria) Slavi Zhekov (substituted off) 46'
MF	18	(Bulgaria) Petar Kostadinov (substituted off) 64'
MF	21	(Guinea-Bissau) Inzaghi Donígio (substituted off) 70'
FW	19	(Democratic Republic of the Congo) Masena Moke
FW	11	(Bulgaria) Georgi Vladimirov
Substitutes:
GK	1	(Bulgaria) Karamfil Ilchev
DF	7	(Bulgaria) Yanko Kosturkov
FW	8	(Bulgaria) Martin Hristov (substituted in) 70'
FW	9	(Bulgaria) Todor Simov
MF	13	(Bulgaria) Dian Genchev (substituted in) 46'
DF	15	(Bulgaria) Aleksandar Aleksandrov
MF	16	(Bulgaria) Vladko Kostadinov (substituted in) 64'
Manager:
(Bulgaria) Yasen Petrov

== See also ==
- 2005–06 A Group
