= 2005–06 PFC Levski Sofia season =

Levski Sofia
2005–06 season
- Chairman: (Bulgaria) Todor Batkov
- Manager: (Bulgaria) Stanimir Stoilov
- Stadium: Georgi Asparuhov Stadium (domestic games); Vasil Levski National Stadium (European matches)
- A Group: Champions
- Bulgarian Cup: 3rd round
- Bulgarian Supercup: Winner
- UEFA Cup: Quarter-finals
- Top goalscorer: League: Valeri Domovchiyski; Dimitar Telkiyski (11 goals); All: Valeri Domovchiyski; Emil Angelov (13 goals)

The 2005–06 season was Levski Sofia's 84th season in the First League. This article shows player statistics and all matches (official and friendly) that the club has played during the 2005–06 season.

== First-team squad ==
Squad at end of season

Note: Flags indicate national team as defined under FIFA eligibility rules; some limited exceptions apply. Players may hold more than one non-FIFA nationality.

No.	Pos.	Nation	Player
1	GK	BUL	Georgi Petkov
3	DF	BUL	Zhivko Milanov
4	DF	BUL	Igor Tomašić
6	MF	NGR	Richard Eromoigbe
7	MF	BUL	Daniel Borimirov
8	MF	BUL	Bogomil Dyakov
10	MF	BUL	Hristo Yovov
11	DF	BUL	Elin Topuzakov
12	GK	BUL	Bozhidar Mitrev
13	MF	BUL	Asen Bukarev
16	MF	BUL	Mariyan Ognyanov

No.	Pos.	Nation	Player
17	FW	BUL	Valeri Domovchiyski
18	MF	BUL	Miroslav Ivanov
20	MF	BUL	Stanislav Angelov
21	MF	BUL	Dimitar Telkiyski
23	FW	NGR	Ekundayo Jayeoba
24	MF	BUL	Nikolay Dimitrov
25	DF	BUL	Lúcio Wagner
27	MF	FRA	Cédric Bardon
28	FW	BUL	Emil Angelov
77	MF	BUL	Milan Koprivarov
88	GK	BUL	Nikolay Mihaylov

=== Left club during season ===
Note: Flags indicate national team as defined under FIFA eligibility rules; some limited exceptions apply. Players may hold more than one non-FIFA nationality.

No.	Pos.	Nation	Player
5	DF	BUL	Anton Vergilov (to Rodopa Smolyan)
19	FW	BUL	Georgi Chilikov (to Nacional Madeira)

== Results ==
=== Bulgarian Supercup ===
31 July 2005	CSKA Sofia	1–1 (a.e.t.) (1–3 p)	Levski Sofia	Sofia
18:30	Yanev 82'		Topuzakov 76'	Stadium: Vasil Levski Stadium; Attendance: 9,894; Referee: (Greece) Georgios Kaznaferis
	Penalties
	Yanev (penalty missed); Dah Zadi (penalty scored); Gargorov (penalty missed); Iliev (penalty missed)		(penalty scored) Topuzakov; (penalty missed) Telkiyski; (penalty scored) Borimirov; (penalty scored) Tomašić

=== A Group ===
==== Table ====
Pos	Team	Pld	W	D	L	GF	GA	GD	Pts	Qualification or relegation
1	Levski Sofia (C)	28	21	5	2	71	23	+48	68	Qualification for Champions League second qualifying round
2	CSKA Sofia	28	20	5	3	73	22	+51	65	Qualification for UEFA Cup first qualifying round
3	Litex Lovech	28	18	6	4	51	22	+29	60	Qualification for UEFA Cup first qualifying round
4	Lokomotiv Sofia	28	18	0	10	49	29	+20	54	Qualification for UEFA Cup first qualifying round
5	Lokomotiv Plovdiv	28	11	7	10	43	42	+1	40	Qualification for Intertoto Cup second round

Source: A PFG (in Bulgarian)
Rules for classification: 1st points; 2nd head-to-head points; 3rd head-to-head goal difference; 4th head-to-head goals scored; 5th head-to-head away goals scored; 6th goal difference; 7th goals scored; 8th "sportsmanship" (R & Y cards); 9th draw
(C) Champions

==== Results summary ====
Overall								Home						Away					
Pld	W	D	L	GF	GA	GD	Pts	W	D	L	GF	GA	GD	W	D	L	GF	GA	GD
28	21	5	2	71	23	+48	68	12	2	0	44	6	+38	9	3	2	27	17	+10

Last updated: 31 May 2006.
Source: Soccerway

==== Results by round ====
Round	1	2	3	4	5	6	7	8	9	10	11	12	13	14	15	16	17	18	19	20	21	22	23	24	25	26	27	28	29	30
Ground	A	A	H	A	H	A	-	A	H	A	H	A	H	A	H	H	H	A	H	A	H	-	H	A	H	A	H	A	H	A
Result	W	W	W	D	D	D	-	W	W	W	W	W	W	L	W	W	W	W	W	W	W	-	W	W	W	D	W	W	D	L
Position	3	3	1	2	2	2	4	4	2	2	2	2	2	2	2	2	2	2	2	1	1	2	1	1	1	1	1	1	1	1

A = Away; H = Home; W = Win; D = Draw; L = Loss

==== Fixtures and results ====
7 August 2005 1	Lokomotiv Plovdiv	2–4	Levski Sofia	Plovdiv
(EET)	Stoynev 31'; Kamburov 90'	Report	Koprivarov 16'; Telkiyski 20'; Borimirov 85'; Jayeoba 90+2'	Stadium: Lokomotiv Stadium; Attendance: 9,000; Referee: Momchil Vraykov

14 August 2005 2	Marek Dupnitsa	2–3	Levski Sofia	Dupnitsa
(EET)	Bizhev 15'; Bachev 35'	Report	Jayeoba 55', 70'; Koprivarov 77'	Stadium: Bonchuk Stadium; Attendance: 4,000; Referee: Tsvetan Georgiev

20 August 2005 3	Levski Sofia	6–0	Neftohimik Burgas	Sofia
(EET)	Borimirov 2' (pen.); Yovov 22', 83'; Koprivarov 62'; Jayeoba 67', 74'	Report		Stadium: Georgi Asparuhov Stadium; Attendance: 3,000; Referee: Georgi Ignatov

28 August 2005 4	Pirin 1922	1–1	Levski Sofia	Blagoevgrad
(EET)	Nikolov 33'	Report	Milanov 38'	Stadium: Hristo Botev Stadium; Attendance: 8,000; Referee: Kostadin Kostadinov

11 September 2005 5	Levski Sofia	1–1	CSKA Sofia	Sofia
(EET)	Telkiyski 38'	Report	Dimitrov 33'	Stadium: Vasil Levski National Stadium; Attendance: 13,000; Referee: Momchil Vraykov

18 September 2005 6	Beroe Stara Zagora	4–4	Levski Sofia	Stara Zagora
(EET)	Kwakye 20', 25', 47'; Mitev 75' (pen.)	Report	Bardon 10', 52'; S. Angelov 18'; E. Angelov 21'	Stadium: Beroe Stadium; Attendance: 10,000; Referee: Tsvetan Georgiev

25 September 2005 7	bye

2 October 2005 8	Cherno More	0–1	Levski Sofia	Varna
(EET)		Report	E. Angelov 78'	Stadium: Ticha Stadium; Attendance: 10,000; Referee: Dimitar Dimitrov

16 October 2005 9	Levski Sofia	3–1	Lokomotiv Sofia	Sofia
(EET)	Domovchiyski 5' (pen.), 33'; Telkiyski 16'	Report	Antunović 66'	Stadium: Georgi Asparuhov Stadium; Attendance: 2,500; Referee: Momchil Vraykov

22 October 2005 10	Rodopa Smolyan	1–2	Levski Sofia	Smolyan
(EET)	Karamanov 90'	Report	Koprivarov 19'; Tomašić 90+5'	Stadium: Septemvri Stadium; Attendance: 4,000; Referee: Georgi Ignatov

28 October 2005 11	Levski Sofia	5–0	Slavia Sofia	Sofia
(EET)	Borimirov 21', 67'; Domovchiyski 27', 83'; Telkiyski 79'	Report		Stadium: Georgi Asparuhov Stadium; Attendance: 5,000; Referee: Kostadin Kostadinov

7 November 2005 12	Vihren Sandanski	1–2	Levski Sofia	Sandanski
(EET)	Sofroniev 52'	Report	E. Angelov 28'; Telkiyski 63'	Stadium: Sandanski Stadium; Attendance: 5,000; Referee: Momchil Vraykov

19 November 2005 13	Levski Sofia	4–1	Botev Plovdiv	Sofia
(EET)	Yovov 34', 44'; Bardon 58'; Borimirov 90'	Report	Andonov 50'	Stadium: Georgi Asparuhov Stadium; Attendance: 1,800; Referee: Hristo Ristoskov

9 December 2005 14	Litex Lovech	1–0	Levski Sofia	Lovech
(EET)	Novaković 84'	Report		Stadium: Lovech Stadium; Attendance: 4,500; Referee: Franz-Xaver Vick (Germany)

4 December 2005 15	Levski Sofia	2–0	Belasitsa Petrich	Sofia
(EET)	Bardon 26'; Domovchiyski 53'	Report		Stadium: Georgi Asparuhov Stadium; Attendance: 1,500; Referee: Stefan Spasov

4 March 2006 16	Levski Sofia	4–0	Lokomotiv Plovdiv	Sofia
(EET)	Telkiyski 15', 43'; Domovchiyski 36'; E. Angelov 84'	Report		Stadium: Vasil Levski National Stadium; Attendance: 4,416; Referee: Hristo Ristoskov

12 March 2006 17	Levski Sofia	2–0	Marek Dupnitsa	Sofia
(EET)	Domovchiyski 20'; Telkiyski 27'	Report		Stadium: Vasil Levski National Stadium; Attendance: 4,000; Referee: Angel Bekyarov

19 March 2006 18	Neftohimik Burgas	0–2	Levski Sofia	Burgas
(EET)		Report	Telkiyski 59'; G. Ivanov 65'	Stadium: Lazur Stadium; Attendance: 10,000; Referee: Stanislav Todorov

26 March 2006 19	Levski Sofia	3–0	Pirin 1922	Sofia
(EET)	G. Ivanov 27'; E. Angelov 38'; Domovchiyski 77'	Report		Stadium: Vasil Levski National Stadium; Attendance: 5,692; Referee: Ivaylo Bozev

2 April 2006 20	CSKA Sofia	0–1	Levski Sofia	Sofia
(EET)		Report	G. Ivanov 59' (pen.)	Stadium: Vasil Levski National Stadium; Attendance: 15,846; Referee: Luca Palancha (Italy)

9 April 2006 21	Levski Sofia	2–0	Beroe Stara Zagora	Sofia
(EET)	G. Ivanov 28'; E. Angelov 90'	Report		Stadium: Georgi Asparuhov Stadium; Attendance: 7,000; Referee: Angel Bekyarov

15 April 2006 22	bye

19 April 2006 23	Levski Sofia	3–1	Cherno More	Sofia
(EET)	Bardon 7'; Borimirov 16'; S. Angelov 73'	Report	Zhekov 27'	Stadium: Georgi Asparuhov Stadium; Attendance: 5,000; Referee: Hristo Ristoskov

23 April 2006 24	Lokomotiv Sofia	0–2	Levski Sofia	Sofia
(EET)		Report	Domovchiyski 29' (pen.), 36'	Stadium: Lokomotiv Sofia); Attendance: 6,000; Referee: Stefan Spasov

29 April 2006 25	Levski Sofia	6–1	Rodopa Smolyan	Sofia
(EET)	Borimirov 9'; Bardon 19'; Domovchiyski 37'; Dimitrov 67', 68'; M. Ivanov 90'	Report	Lyaskov 12'	Stadium: Georgi Asparuhov Stadium; Attendance: 5,000; Referee: Stoyan Aleksiev

6 May 2006 26	Slavia Sofia	2–2	Levski Sofia	Sofia
(EET)	Valkanov 34' Kyumurdzhiev 76'	Report	Topuzakov 17' Bardon 44'	Stadium: Ovcha Kupel Stadium; Attendance: 5,000; Referee: Dimitar Dimitrov

16 May 2006 27	Levski Sofia	2–0	Rodopa Smolyan	Sofia
(EET)	Borimirov 45'; Telkiyski 50' (pen.)	Report		Stadium: Georgi Asparuhov Stadium; Attendance: 6,000; Referee: Stanislav Todorov

20 May 2006 28	Botev Plovdiv	1–2	Levski Sofia	Plovdiv
(EET)	Andonov 90'	Report	G. Ivanov 11' (pen.) Borimirov 60'	Stadium: Hristo Botev Stadium; Attendance: 6,000; Referee: Stoyan Aleksiev

27 May 2006 29	Levski Sofia	1–1	Litex Lovech	Sofia
(EET)	Telkiyski 35' (pen.)	Report	Novaković 61'	Stadium: Georgi Asparuhov Stadium; Attendance: 23,000; Referee: Johnny Var Ecke (Belgium)

31 May 2006 30	Belasitsa Petrich	2–1	Levski Sofia	Petrich
(EET)	Eduardo Dos Santos 28'; Marcos Junior 74'	Report	Pavlov 90'	Stadium: Tsar Samuil Stadium; Attendance: 3,000; Referee: Martin Bogdev

=== Bulgarian Cup ===
11 November 2005 Second round	Haskovo	0–2	Levski Sofia	Haskovo
(EET)		Report	E. Angelov 40'; Telkiyski 71'	Stadium: Haskovo Stadium; Attendance: 5,000; Referee: Angel Angelov

22 March 2006 Third round	Cherno More	3–2 (a.e.t.)	Levski Sofia	Varna
(EET)	Hristov 23'; Kostadinov 36'; Vachev 108'	Report	E. Angelov 57'; G. Ivanov 68'	Stadium: Ticha Stadium; Attendance: 10,000; Referee: Dimitar Dimitrov

=== UEFA Cup ===
==== Second qualifying round ====
11 August 2005 1st leg	Publikum Celje (Slovenia)	1–0	(Bulgaria) Levski Sofia	Celje, Slovenia
19:30	Bersnjak 68'	MatchCentre		Stadium: Arena Petrol; Attendance: 2,000; Referee: Khagani Mammadov (Azerbaijan)

25 August 2005 2nd leg	Levski Sofia (Bulgaria)	3–0 (3–1 agg.)	(Slovenia) Publikum Celje	Sofia, Bulgaria
19:15	Yovov 41' 64'; Domovchiyski 69'	MatchCentre		Stadium: Georgi Asparuhov Stadium; Attendance: 12,000; Referee: Costas Theodotou (Cyprus)

==== First round ====
15 September 2005 1st leg	Auxerre (France)	2–1	(Bulgaria) Levski Sofia	Auxerre, France
20:15	Poyet 55'; Pieroni 68'	MatchCentre	Bardon 34'	Stadium: Stade de l'Abbe-Deschamps; Attendance: 6,000; Referee: Helmut Fleischer (Germany)

29 September 2005 2nd leg	Levski Sofia (Bulgaria)	1–0 (2–2 (a) agg.)	(France) Auxerre	Sofia, Bulgaria
18:30	Koprivarov 28'	MatchCentre		Stadium: Georgi Asparuhov Stadium; Attendance: 25,000; Referee: Martin Ingvarsson (Sweden)

==== Group stage ====
Pos	Team	Pld	W	D	L	GF	GA	GD	Pts	Qualification	OM	LS	HVN	CSM	DB
1	(France) Marseille	4	3	0	1	5	3	+2	9	Advance to knockout stage	—	—	1–0	—	2–1
2	(Bulgaria) Levski Sofia	4	2	0	2	4	4	0	6	Advance to knockout stage	1–0	—	—	—	1–0
3	(Netherlands) Heerenveen	4	1	2	1	2	2	0	5	Advance to knockout stage	—	2–1	—	0–0	—
4	(Russia) CSKA Moscow	4	1	1	2	3	4	−1	4		1–2	2–1	—	—	—
5	(Romania) Dinamo București	4	1	1	2	2	3	−1	4		—	—	0–0	1–0	—

3 November 2005 1	Levski Sofia (Bulgaria)	1–0	(Romania) Dinamo București	Sofia, Bulgaria
19:00	E. Angelov 90'	Report		Stadium: Georgi Asparuhov Stadium; Attendance: 23,000; Referee: Nikolai Ivanov (Russia)

24 November 2005 2	CSKA Moscow (Russia)	2–1	(Bulgaria) Levski Sofia	Moscow, Russia
16:30	Vagner Love 49', 73'	Report	Domovchiyski 90'	Stadium: Dynamo Stadium; Attendance: 15,000; Referee: Kenny Clark (Scotland)

1 December 2005 3	Levski Sofia (Bulgaria)	1–0	(France) Marseille	Sofia, Bulgaria
18:30	Yovov 54'	Report		Stadium: Georgi Asparuhov Stadium; Attendance: 22,000; Referee: Nicolai Vollquartz (Denmark)

14 December 2005 4	Heerenveen (Netherlands)	2–1	(Bulgaria) Levski Sofia	Heerenveen, Netherlands
20:45	Samaras 55'; Hanssen 90'	Report	M. Ivanov 53'	Stadium: Abe Lenstra Stadion; Attendance: 21,000; Referee: Zsolt Szabo (Hungary)

==== Round of 32 ====
15 February 2006 1st leg	Artmedia Bratislava (Slovakia)	0–1	(Bulgaria) Levski Sofia	Trnava, Slovakia
17:30		Report	E. Angelov 9'	Stadium: Stadion Antona Malatinskeho; Attendance: 5,217; Referee: Laurent Duhamel (France)

23 February 2006 2nd leg	Levski Sofia (Bulgaria)	2–0 (3–0 agg.)	(Slovakia) Artmedia Bratislava	Sofia, Bulgaria
17:00	E. Angelov 14', 27'	Report		Stadium: Vasil Levski National Stadium; Attendance: 30,000; Referee: Gerald Lehner (Austria)

==== Round of 16 ====
9 March 2006 1st leg	Udinese (Italy)	0–0	(Bulgaria) Levski Sofia	Udine, Italy
20:45		Report		Stadium: Stadio Friuli; Attendance: 10,000; Referee: Frank De Bleeckere (Belgium)

16 March 2006 2nd leg	Levski Sofia (Bulgaria)	2–1 (2–1 agg.)	(Italy) Udinese	Sofia, Bulgaria
17:30	Borimirov 51'; Tomašić 63'	Report	Tissone 22'	Stadium: Vasil Levski National Stadium; Attendance: 40,000; Referee: Steve Bennett (England)

==== Quarter-finals ====
30 March 2006 1st leg	Levski Sofia (Bulgaria)	1–3	(Germany) Schalke 04	Sofia, Bulgaria
19:00	Borimirov 6'	Report	Varela 48'; Lincoln 69'; Asamoah 79'	Stadium: Vasil Levski National Stadium; Attendance: 39,000; Referee: Mike Riley (England)

6 April 2006 2nd leg	Schalke 04 (Germany)	1–1 (4–2 agg.)	(Bulgaria) Levski Sofia	Gelsenkirchen, Germany
20:30	Lincoln 58'	Report	E. Angelov 24'	Stadium: Veltins-Arena; Attendance: 53,000; Referee: Massimo Busacca (Switzerland)
