= 2005–06 PFC CSKA Sofia season =

CSKA Sofia
2005–06 season
- Chairman: Vassil Bozhkov
- Manager: Miodrag Ješić (until 4 April 2006); Plamen Markov
- A Group: Second place
- Bulgarian Cup: Winner
- Bulgarian Supercup: Runner-up
- UEFA Champions League: Third qualifying round
- UEFA Cup: Group stage
- Top goalscorer: League: Emil Gargorov (11); All: Emil Gargorov (16)
- Highest home attendance: 15,846 vs Levski Sofia (2 April 2006)
- Lowest home attendance: 1,000 vs Rodopa Smolyan (19 November 2005)
Home colours	Away colours

The 2005–06 season was PFC CSKA Sofia's 58th consecutive season in A Group.

Below is a list of player statistics and all matches (official and friendly) that the club played during the 2005–06 season.

== Club ==
=== Team kits ===
The team kits for the 2005–06 season are produced by Uhlsport and sponsored by Vivatel.

== Squad ==
Note: Flags indicate national team as defined under FIFA eligibility rules; some limited exceptions apply. Players may hold more than one non-FIFA nationality.

No.	Pos.	Nation	Player
1	GK	SCG	Dejan Maksić
2	DF	SVK	Radoslav Zabavnik
3	DF	BUL	Aleksandar Tunchev
4	DF	BUL	Adrian Olegov
5	DF	BUL	Vladimir Zafirov
7	MF	BUL	Hristo Yanev
8	FW	BUL	Velizar Dimitrov
11	FW	CIV	Guillaume Dah Zadi
12	GK	BUL	Todor Kyuchukov
14	DF	BUL	Valentin Iliev
15	MF	BUL	Petar Dimitrov
16	DF	BUL	Aleksandar Branekov
17	FW	CRO	Matija Matko

No.	Pos.	Nation	Player
18	MF	MAR	Mourad Hdiouad
19	FW	ROU	Eugen Trica
20	MF	BUL	Yordan Yurukov
21	FW	BUL	Stoiko Sakaliev
23	MF	BUL	Emil Gargorov
6	MF	BIH	Sergej Jakirović
25	DF	BUL	Ivan Ivanov
27	DF	BRA	Tiago Silva
29	DF	SEN	Ibrahima Gueye
30	DF	BUL	Yordan Todorov
31	GK	MDA	Evgheni Hmaruc
33	DF	SCG	Slavko Matić
77	FW	POR	Jose Emilio Furtado

== Competitions ==
=== A Group ===
==== Table ====
Pos	Team	Pld	W	D	L	GF	GA	GD	Pts	Qualification or relegation
1	Levski Sofia (C)	28	21	5	2	71	23	+48	68	Qualification for Champions League second qualifying round
2	CSKA Sofia	28	20	5	3	73	22	+51	65	Qualification for UEFA Cup first qualifying round
3	Litex Lovech	28	18	6	4	51	22	+29	60	Qualification for UEFA Cup first qualifying round
4	Lokomotiv Sofia	28	18	0	10	49	29	+20	54	Qualification for UEFA Cup first qualifying round
5	Lokomotiv Plovdiv	28	11	7	10	43	42	+1	40	Qualification for Intertoto Cup second round

Source: A PFG (in Bulgarian)
Rules for classification: 1st points; 2nd head-to-head points; 3rd head-to-head goal difference; 4th head-to-head goals scored; 5th head-to-head away goals scored; 6th goal difference; 7th goals scored; 8th "sportsmanship" (R & Y cards); 9th draw
(C) Champions

==== Results summary ====
Overall								Home						Away					
Pld	W	D	L	GF	GA	GD	Pts	W	D	L	GF	GA	GD	W	D	L	GF	GA	GD
28	20	5	3	73	22	+51	65	11	2	1	43	11	+32	9	3	2	30	11	+19

Last updated: 31 May 2006.
Source: Soccerway

==== Results by round ====
Round	1	2	3	4	5	6	7	8	9	10	11	12	13	14	15	16	17	18	19	20	21	22	23	24	25	26	27	28	29	30
Ground	A	H	A	H	A	H	A	A	H	-	H	A	H	A	H	H	A	H	A	H	A	H	H	A	-	A	H	A	H	A
Result	W	W	W	W	D	W	W	W	W	-	W	W	W	W	W	W	D	D	L	L	W	W	D	W	-	D	W	L	W	W
Position	2	2	2	1	1	1	1	1	1	1	1	1	1	1	1	1	1	1	1	2	2	1	2	2	2	2	2	2	2	2

Source: CSKA Sofia league results
W = Win; D = Draw; L = Loss

==== Fixtures and results ====
6 August 2005 1	Botev Plovdiv	1–4	CSKA	Plovdiv
18:30	Saidhodzha 50'		Dah Zadi 1'; Gargorov 8', 76'; Sakaliev 78'	Stadium: Hristo Botev Stadium; Attendance: 4,000

14 August 2005 2	CSKA	2–1	Litex	Sofia
20:45	Dah Zadi 43'; Hdiouad 89' (pen.)		Popov 1'	Stadium: Bulgarska Armiya Stadium; Attendance: 3,000

20 August 2005 3	Belasitsa	1–5	CSKA	Petrich
18:30	Diano 45'		Yurukov 8', 29'; Todorov 65'; Tiago Silva 81', 90+1'	Stadium: Tsar Samuil Stadium; Attendance: 5,000

26 October 2005 4	CSKA	4–3	Lokomotiv Plovdiv	Sofia
19:30	Sakaliev 25'; Zabavnik 31'; Dimitrov 42'; Jakirovic 75'		Tunchev 9', 69'; Kamburov 85'	Stadium: Bulgarska Armiya Stadium; Attendance: 4,000

11 September 2005 5	Levski	1–1	CSKA	Sofia
18:00	Telkiyski 36'		Dimitrov 31'	Stadium: Vasil Levski National Stadium; Attendance: 13,628

18 September 2005 6	CSKA	3–0	Naftex	Sofia
20:30	Sakaliev 8', 61'; Todorov 87'			Stadium: Bulgarska Armiya Stadium; Attendance: 6,000

24 September 2005 7	Pirin 1922	0–3	CSKA	Blagoevgrad
17:30			Sakaliev 30', 33'; Gargorov 90+1'	Stadium: Hristo Botev Stadium; Attendance: 4,500

2 October 2005 8	Marek	1–4	CSKA	Dupnitsa
15:00	Iliev 21'		Hdiouad 15' (pen.); Gargorov 24'; Sakaliev 37'; Dimitrov 62'	Stadium: Bonchuk Stadium; Attendance: 2,000

15 October 2005 9	CSKA	7–0	Beroe	Sofia
19:30	Hdiouad 7', 13', 56'; Dah Zadi 27', 90+3'; Sakaliev 41'; Todorov 44'			Stadium: Bulgarska Armiya Stadium; Attendance: 1,500

23 October 2005 10	CSKA	–	Pirin Blagoevgrad	Sofia
				Stadium: Bulgarska Armiya Stadium
Note: On 18 August 2005 Pirin Blagoevgrad was removed from A Group after Round 2 because of outstanding obligations to National Insurance Institute. All results of Pirin so far are canceled and their opponents in the next meetings will rest. PFC Pirin has the right to renew its participation in the league for season 2005/2006 in South-West V AFG.

29 October 2005 11	CSKA	3–0	Cherno More	Sofia
19:30	Gargorov 33'; Yurukov 58'; Dimitrov 90+3'			Stadium: Bulgarska Armiya Stadium; Attendance: 2,000

6 November 2005 12	Lokomotiv Sofia	1–2	CSKA	Sofia
14:30	Genkov 17'		Branekov 28'; Tiago Silva 90' (pen.)	Stadium: Lokomotiv Stadium; Attendance: 3,500

19 November 2005 13	CSKA	7–0	Rodopa	Sofia
15:00	Yanev 22' (pen.), 34' (pen.); Sakaliev 36', 43'; Dah Zadi 55', 73'; Gargorov 87'			Stadium: Bulgarska Armiya Stadium; Attendance: 1,000

26 November 2005 14	Slavia	1–2	CSKA	Sofia
14:00	Ivanovic 70'		Dah Zadi 35'; Iliev 76'	Stadium: Slavia Stadium; Attendance: 2,000

4 December 2005 15	CSKA	6–0	Vihren	Sofia
15:00	Gueye 29', 67'; Dah Zadi 45+1'; Yanev 69'; Dimitrov 84', 89'			Stadium: Bulgarska Armiya Stadium; Attendance: 1,000

5 March 2006 16	CSKA	1–0	Botev Plovdiv	Sofia
15:30	Hdiouad 33'			Stadium: Bulgarska Armiya Stadium

12 March 2006 17	Litex	1–1	CSKA	Lovech
14:00	Novakovic 46'		Dah Zadi 28'	Stadium: Lovech Stadium; Attendance: 4,500

19 March 2006 18	CSKA	2–2	Belasitsa	Sofia
15:30	Furtado 70'; Dimitrov 87'		Ivanov 45+2'; Marquinhos 58'	Stadium: Bulgarska Armiya Stadium; Attendance: 4,500

26 March 2006 19	Lokomotiv Plovdiv	1–0	CSKA	Plovdiv
15:00	Zlatinov 10'			Stadium: Lokomotiv Stadium

2 April 2006 20	CSKA	0–1	Levski	Sofia
18:00			Ivanov 59' (pen.)	Stadium: Vasil Levski National Stadium; Attendance: 15,846

8 April 2006 21	Naftex	0–1	CSKA	Burgas
18:30			Gargorov 38'	Stadium: Lazur Stadium; Attendance: 5,000

15 April 2006 22	CSKA	2–0	Pirin 1922	Sofia
19:00	Furtado 1'; Jakirovic 32'			Stadium: Bulgarska Armiya Stadium; Attendance: 2,000

19 April 2006 23	CSKA	1–1	Marek	Sofia
18:00	Furtado 90+1'		Mitov 16'	Stadium: Bulgarska Armiya Stadium; Attendance: 1,000

23 April 2006 24	Beroe	1–4	CSKA	Stara Zagora
15:00	Dimitrov 84'		Trica 49'; Gargorov 57', 60'; Furtado 81'	Stadium: Beroe Stadium; Attendance: 5,500

30 April 2006 25	Pirin Blagoevgrad	–	CSKA	Blagoevgrad
				Stadium: Hristo Botev Stadium
Note: On 18 August 2005 Pirin Blagoevgrad was removed from A Group after Round 2 because of outstanding obligations to National Insurance Institute. All results of Pirin so far are canceled and their opponents in the next meetings will rest. PFC Pirin has the right to renew its participation in the league for season 2005/2006 in South-West V AFG.

6 May 2006 26	Cherno More	0–0	CSKA	Varna
16:00				Stadium: Ticha Stadium; Attendance: 9,000

16 May 2006 27	CSKA	3–2	Lokomotiv Sofia	Sofia
20:30	Hdiouad 7' (pen.); Dah Zadi 9'; Furtado 81'		Kazadzhinov 11'; Paskov 68' (pen.)	Stadium: Bulgarska Armiya Stadium; Attendance: 2,000

20 May 2006 28	Rodopa	1–0	CSKA	Smolyan
18:00	Peev 18'			Stadium: Septemvri Stadium; Attendance: 3,500

28 May 2006 29	CSKA	2–1	Slavia	Sofia
18:00	Tiago Silva 15'; Gargorov 35'		Stefanov 48'	Stadium: Bulgarska Armiya Stadium; Attendance: 1,000

31 May 2006 30	Vihren	1–3	CSKA	Sandanski
18:00	Stoynev 4'		Tunchev 16'; Furtado 41'; Gargorov 57'	Stadium: Sandanski Stadium; Attendance: 1,000

=== Bulgarian Cup ===
11 November 2005 Second round	Belasitsa	1–2	CSKA	Petrich
14:00	Dinkov 11'		Yanev 44'; Dah Zadi 90'	Stadium: Tsar Samuil Stadium

22 March 2006 Third round	CSKA	1–0	Litex	Sofia
17:00	Hdiouad 43'			Stadium: Bulgarska Armiya Stadium; Attendance: 6,000

12 April 2006 Quarter-final	CSKA	4–1	Beroe	Sofia
16:30	Tunchev 11'; Trica 37'; Hdiouad 56'; Todorov 90+2'		Todorov 65'	Stadium: Bulgarska Armiya Stadium; Attendance: 1,000

3 May 2006 Semi-final	CSKA	4–1	Naftex	Sofia
17:30	Gargorov 39'; Tiago Silva 52'; Trica 61'; Hdiouad 88'		Serra 37'	Stadium: Bulgarska Armiya Stadium; Attendance: 1,200

24 May 2006 Final	CSKA	3–1	Cherno More	Sofia
17:30	Gargorov 12' 28'; Dah Zadi 34'		Moke 90+4' (pen.)	Stadium: Vasil Levski National Stadium; Attendance: 7,216; Referee: Santiago Rodríguez (Spain)

=== Bulgarian Supercup ===
CSKA lost the game on penalty shoot-out after the extra time.

31 July 2005 Final	CSKA	1–1 (a.e.t.) (1–3 p)	Levski	Sofia
18:30	Yanev 82'		Topuzakov 76'	Stadium: Vasil Levski National Stadium; Attendance: 9,894; Referee: Georgios Kaznaferis (Greece)
	Penalties
	Yanev (penalty missed); Dah Zadi (penalty scored); Gargorov (penalty missed); Iliev (penalty missed)		(penalty scored) Topuzakov; (penalty missed) Telkiyski; (penalty scored) Borimirov; (penalty scored) Tomašić

=== UEFA Champions League ===
==== Second qualifying round ====
27 July 2005 First leg	Tirana (Albania)	0–2	(Bulgaria) CSKA	Tirana, Albania
21:30		Report	Gueye 89'; Gargorov 90+2'	Stadium: Qemal Stafa Stadium; Attendance: 6,000; Referee: Kristinn Jakobsson (Iceland)

3 August 2005 Second leg	CSKA (Bulgaria)	2–0 (4–0 agg.)	(Albania) Tirana	Sofia, Bulgaria
20:45	Dah Zadi 2'; Todorov 90'	Report		Stadium: Bulgarska Armiya Stadium; Attendance: 3,100; Referee: Martin Ingvarsson (Sweden)

==== Third qualifying round ====
10 August 2005 First leg	CSKA (Bulgaria)	1–3	(England) Liverpool	Sofia, Bulgaria
21:45	Dimitrov 45'	Report	Cissé 25'; Morientes 31', 58'	Stadium: Vasil Levski National Stadium; Attendance: 16,512; Referee: Jan Wegereef (Netherlands)

23 August 2005 Second leg	Liverpool (England)	0–1 (3–2 agg.)	(Bulgaria) CSKA	Liverpool, England
22:05		Report	Iliev 14'	Stadium: Anfield; Attendance: 42,175; Referee: Wolfgang Stark (Germany)

=== UEFA Cup ===
==== First round ====
15 September 2005 First leg	Bayer Leverkusen (Germany)	0–1	(Bulgaria) CSKA	Leverkusen, Germany
19:15		Report	Todorov 15'	Stadium: BayArena; Attendance: 20,000; Referee: Serge Gumienny (Belgium)

29 September 2005 Second leg	CSKA (Bulgaria)	1–0 (2–0 agg.)	(Germany) Bayer Leverkusen	Sofia, Bulgaria
17:15	Hdiouad 67'	Report		Stadium: Bulgarska Armiya Stadium; Attendance: 22,000; Referee: Espen Berntsen (Norway)

==== Group stage ====
Pos	Team	Pld	W	D	L	GF	GA	GD	Pts	Qualification	MON	HSV	SLA	VIK	CSS
1	(France) Monaco	4	3	0	1	6	2	+4	9	Advance to knockout stage	—	2–0	—	—	2–1
2	(Germany) Hamburger SV	4	3	0	1	5	2	+3	9	Advance to knockout stage	—	—	2–0	2–0	—
3	(Czech Republic) Slavia Prague	4	1	1	2	6	8	−2	4	Advance to knockout stage	0–2	—	—	—	4–2
4	(Norway) Viking	4	1	1	2	3	6	−3	4		1–0	—	2–2	—	—
5	(Bulgaria) CSKA Sofia	4	1	0	3	5	7	−2	3		—	0–1	—	2–0	—

20 October 2005 1	CSKA (Bulgaria)	0–1	(Germany) Hamburg	Sofia, Bulgaria
21:15		Report	van der Vaart 57'	Stadium: Bulgarska Armiya Stadium; Attendance: 22,000; Referee: Pedro Proença (Portugal)

3 November 2005 2	Slavia Prague (Czech Republic)	4–2	(Bulgaria) CSKA	Prague, Czech Republic
21:00	Fořt 5', 75'; Vlček 36'; Piták 56'	Report	Gargorov 10'; Sakaliev 58'	Stadium: Stadion Evžena Rošického; Attendance: 7,171; Referee: Sergey Shebek (Ukraine)

30 November 2005 3	CSKA (Bulgaria)	2–0	(Norway) Viking	Sofia, Bulgaria
21:45	Yanev 34' (pen.); Dah Zadi 46'	Report		Stadium: Bulgarska Armiya Stadium; Attendance: 8,000; Referee: Costas Kapitanis (Cyprus)

15 December 2005 4	Monaco (France)	2–1	(Bulgaria) CSKA	Monaco
19:30	Kapo 49'; Squillaci 74'	Report	Dimitrov 83'	Stadium: Stade Louis II; Attendance: 7,296; Referee: Dougie McDonald (Scotland)
