= 2005–06 Bulgarian Cup =

Tournament details
- Country: Bulgaria

Final positions
- Champions: CSKA Sofia (18th cup)
- Runners-up: Cherno More Varna

The 2005–06 Bulgarian Cup was the 66th season of the Bulgarian Cup. CSKA Sofia won the competition, beating Cherno More Varna 3–1 in the final at the Vasil Levski National Stadium in Sofia.

== First round ==
In this round entered winners from the preliminary rounds together with the teams from B Group.

Team 1	Score	Team 2
25 October 2005
Nesebar (II)	2–1	Etar 1924 (II)
Minyor Bobov Dol (II)	1–0	Dobrudzha Dobrich (II)
26 October 2005
Spartak Pleven (II)	4–1	Zagorets Nova Zagora (II)
Balkan Botevgrad (II)	0–2	Minyor Radnevo (II)
Suvorovo (III)	1–4	Spartak Plovdiv (II)
Pirin Gotse Delchev (II)	2–0	Spartak Varna (II)
Haskovo (II)	2–0	Montana (II)
Minyor Pernik (II)	1–0	Maritsa Plovdiv (II)
Pomorie (II)	2–1	Svetkavitsa (II)
Conegliano German (II)	5–0	Lokomotiv Mezdra (II)
Rilski Sportist (II)	2–1	Dunav Ruse (II)
Arkus Lyaskovets (III)	0–0 (a.e.t.) (3–1 p)	Sliven 2000 (II)
Hebar Pazardzhik (II)	0–0 (a.e.t.) (2–4 p)	Vidima-Rakovski (II)
Shumen (II)	5–0	Kaliakra Kavarna (II)
Belite orli Pleven (II)	2–4	Yantra Gabrovo (II)
2 November 2005
Chernomorets Burgas (III)	4–1	Benkovski Kostinbrod (III)

== Second round ==
This round featured winners from the First Round and all teams from A Group.

Team 1	Score	Team 2
9 November 2005
Lokomotiv Plovdiv	1–2	Marek Dupnitsa
Spartak Pleven (II)	4–1	Spartak Plovdiv (II)
Rilski Sportist (II)	1–0	Slavia Sofia
Pirin 1922	2–1	Lokomotiv Sofia
Nesebar (II)	0–2 (a.e.t.)	Rodopa Smolyan
Minyor Pernik (II)	1–2	Beroe Stara Zagora
Vidima-Rakovski (II)	3–1	Minyor Bobov Dol (II)
Chernomorets Burgas (III)	1–1 (a.e.t.) (4–5 p)	Naftex Burgas
Yantra Gabrovo (II)	0–1	Minyor Radnevo (II)
Arkus Lyaskovets (III)	2–0	Pirin Gotse Delchev (II)
10 November 2005
Conegliano German (II)	0–2	Litex Lovech
Pomorie (II)	0–0 (a.e.t.) (4–5 p)	Shumen (II)
11 November 2005
Belasitsa Petrich	1–2	CSKA Sofia
Haskovo (II)	0–2	Levski Sofia
30 November 2005
Botev Plovdiv	1–1 (a.e.t.) (3–4 p)	Vihren Sandanski

== Third round ==
Team 1	Score	Team 2
10 December 2005
Arkus Lyaskovets (III)	0–4	Naftex Burgas
Rodopa Smolyan	0–2 (a.e.t.)	Pirin 1922
Vidima-Rakovski (II)	0–1 (a.e.t.)	Beroe Stara Zagora
Shumen (II)	3–0	Spartak Pleven (II)
Rilski Sportist (II)	5–0	Minyor Radnevo (II)
14 December 2005
Vihren Sandanski	2–1	Marek Dupnitsa
22 March 2006
Cherno More Varna	3–2 (a.e.t.)	Levski Sofia
CSKA Sofia	1–0	Litex Lovech

== Quarter-finals ==
12 April 2006	Pirin 1922	1–1 (a.e.t.) (4–5 p)	Naftex Burgas	Blagoevgrad
16:30 EEST	Nikolov 53'		Krastev 86'	Stadium: Hristo Botev; Attendance: 200

12 April 2006	Shumen (II)	2–1 (a.e.t.)	Rilski Sportist (II)	Shumen
16:30 EEST	Hristiyanov 57', 104' (pen.)		Adzhov 85'	Stadium: Panayot Volov; Attendance: 2,000

12 April 2006	CSKA Sofia	4–1	Beroe Stara Zagora	Sofia
16:30 EEST	Tunchev 11'; Trica 37'; Hdiouad 56'; Todorov 90+2'	Report	Todorov 65'	Stadium: Balgarska Armiya; Attendance: 2,000; Referee: Dimitar Dimitrov (Sofia)

12 April 2006	Vihren Sandanski	0–2 (a.e.t.)	Cherno More	Sandanski
16:30 EEST			Vladimirov 96', 114'	Stadium: Sandanski; Attendance: 1,000; Referee: Angel Bekyarov (Plovdiv)

== Semi-finals ==
3 May 2006	Shumen (II)	1–2 (a.e.t.)	Cherno More	Shumen
16:00 EEST	Hristiyanov 25'; Grigorov (yellow card); Mihaylov (yellow card); Hikmet (yellow card); Borisov (yellow card); Yankov (yellow card)		Moke 10'; P. Kostadinov 95'; Inzaghi (yellow card); P. Kostadinov (yellow card)	Stadium: Panayot Volov; Attendance: 8,500; Referee: Dimitar Dimitrov (Sofia)

3 May 2006	CSKA Sofia	4–1	Naftex Burgas	Sofia
17:30 EEST	Iliev (yellow card) 12'; Gargorov 39'; Tiago Silva 52'; Trica 61'; Hdiouad 88'	Report	Todorov (yellow card) 24'; Serra 37'	Stadium: Balgarska Armiya; Attendance: 1,200

== Final ==
=== Details ===
24 May 2006
17:30 EEST

CSKA Sofia	3–1	Cherno More
Gargorov 12', 28'; Dah Zadi 34'		Moke 90+3'

Vasil Levski, Sofia
Attendance: 7,216
Referee: Santiago Rodríguez (Spain)

CSKA Sofia	Cherno More
