= Cassamá =

Cassamá is a surname. Notable people with the surname include:

- Adilson Soares Cassamá (born 1983), Guinea-Bissauan football (soccer) midfielder
- Cipriano Cassamá, politician in Guinea-Bissau and a member of the African Party for the Independence of Guinea and Cape Verde
- Ivanildo Cassamá (born 1986), Guinea-Bissauan-born Portuguese footballer who plays for Portimonense SC, as a winger
- Moreto Cassamá (born 1998), Guinea-Bissauan footballer who plays for Stade de Reims as a midfielder
