= Rangelov =

Rangelov (Bulgarian: Рангелов) is a Bulgarian surname derived from the personal name Rangel. Notable people with the surname include:

- Bogdan Rangelov (born 1997), Serbian footballer
- Dimitar Rangelov (born 1983), Bulgarian footballer
- Radoslav Rangelov (born 1985), Bulgarian footballer
- Rumen Rangelov (born 1985), Bulgarian footballer
