= Vivatel =

BTC Mobile
- Type: limited liability company
- Industry: Wireless Services; Telecommunication
- Founded: 2005
- Headquarters: Sofia, Bulgaria
- Key people: Richard Shearer, CEO
- Products: GSM, GPRS, EDGE, UMTS (HSDPA)
- Website: http://www.vivatel.bg

vivatel was a mobile operator in Bulgaria. It started operating in November 2005, receiving a GSM operator license in June 2004 and an UMTS license in May 2005. The 3G network was launched in April 2007. The company is owned by BTC JSC.

vivatel started in November 2005 with extended portfolio of mobile services for private and business clients, with low prices.

In November 2007, two years after its launch, vivatel has reached one million clients, which is around 10% market share.

vivatel is a sponsor of many music-related events: the concerts of Rihanna, Pink, INXS and Vaya Con Dios in Bulgaria, music award shows and more. It also sponsors volleyball, ice-skating, streetball, snowboarding, electronic sports and sport events.

In May 2007 American International Group acquired 65% of the Bulgarian Telecommunications Company and vivatel for €1.08 billion.

On September 10, 2009 vivatel merged with the parent company BTC under the brand vivacom.
