= Miroslav Milošević (footballer, born 1976) =

Serbian footballer

Personal information
- Date of birth: 29 August 1976 (age 50)
- Place of birth: Niš, SFR Yugoslavia
- Height: 1.86 m (6 ft 1 in)
- Position: Centre-back

Youth career
- 1988–1994: Radnički Niš

Senior career*
| Years | Team | Apps | (Gls) |
| 1994–1997 | Radnički Niš | | |
| 1997–1999 | Pelister | | |
| 2000–2004 | Cherno More | 75 | (1) |
| 2004–2005 | Alki Larnaca | 24 | (1) |
| 2005–2007 | Cherno More | 31 | (1) |
| 2007–2008 | Alki Larnaca | 2 | (0) |
| 2008–2009 | Laktaši | 20 | (0) |
| 2010 | Dobrudzha Dobrich | 13 | (0) |
- * Club domestic league appearances and goals

Miroslav Milošević (Serbian Cyrillic: Mиpocлaв Mилoшeвић; born 29 August 1976) is a Serbian former professional footballer who played as a centre-back.

== Honours ==
Cherno More

- Bulgarian Cup: runner-up 2006
