= Adilson (footballer, born 1983) =

Bissau-Guinean footballer

Personal information
- Full name: Adilson Soares Cassamá
- Date of birth: 20 April 1983 (age 43)
- Place of birth: Bissau, Guinea-Bissau
- Height: 1.77 m (5 ft 10 in)
- Position: Defensive midfielder

Youth career
- 1995–1998: Porto
- 1998–1999: Rio Ave
- 1999–2000: União Lamas

Senior career*
Years	Team	Apps	(Gls)
2000–2002	União Lamas	54	(5)
2002–2003	Nacional		(0)
2003–2006	União Madeira	24	(0)
2004–2005	→ Estrela Amadora (loan)	17	(0)
2005	→ Ovarense (loan)	6	(0)
2006	→ Cherno More (loan)		(0)
2006–2007	Nacional		(0)
2007–2008	Real Massamá	16	(2)
2010–2011	Monte Carlo	17	(2)
2011–2014	Jeunesse Junglinster	93	(6)

International career
2003-2008	Guinea-Bissau		
- * Club domestic league appearances and goals as of 1 June 2011

Adilson Soares Cassamá (born 20 April 1983), known simply as Adilson, is a Bissau-Guinean former footballer who played as a defensive midfielder. Adilson played for multiple clubs including FC Porto in their youth ranks, União Lamas, C.D. Nacional, C.F. União, C.F. Estrela da Amadora and Jeunesse Junglinster.

He also represented the Guinea-Bissau national football team from 2003 until 2008.
