= Ventsislav Ivanov (footballer, born 1982) =

Bulgarian footballer

Personal information
- Full name: Ventsislav Emilov Ivanov
- Date of birth: 20 May 1982 (age 44)
- Place of birth: Bulgaria
- Height: 1.86 m (6 ft 1 in)
- Position: Forward

Senior career*
Years	Team	Apps	(Gls)
2000–2001	Hebar Pazardzhik	15	(3)
2001–2006	Belasitsa Petrich	119	(20)
2007	Chernomorets Burgas	11	(0)
2008–2010	Montana	67	(27)
2010–2011	AEP Paphos	27	(6)
2011–2012	Minyor Pernik	16	(0)
2013–2014	Montana	34	(11)
2014	Víkingur Reykjavík	6	(0)
2015–2016	Botev Vratsa	31	(17)
2017	Akritas Chlorakas	9	(3)
2017–2018	Spartak Pleven	7	(3)
2018–2019	Kom Berkovitsa		
2021	Levski Lom	2	(0)

Managerial career
- 2019: Montana (assistant manager)
- 2019–2020: Montana (manager)
- 2020–2021: Montana (assistant manager)
- 2021: Montana (youth coach)
- 2021: Levski Lom (manager)
- 2021–2022: Levski Lom (assistant manager)
- 2022–2023: Belasitsa Petrich (manager)
- * Club domestic league appearances and goals

Ventsislav Ivanov (Bulgarian: Венцислав Иванов; born 20 May 1982) is a Bulgarian former footballer.

== Career ==
He had previously played for Belasitsa Petrich and Chernomorets Burgas. He signed with Montana in January 2008.

During the 2008–09 season Ivanov became the topscorer of the Bulgarian second division with 20 goals in 29 matches, helping the side achieve promotion to the top division.

On 4 January 2017, Ivanov signed with Cypriot club Akritas Chlorakas.

On 11 July 2017, Ivanov joined Spartak Pleven.
