= Daniel Morales (footballer, born 1975) =

Brazilian footballer

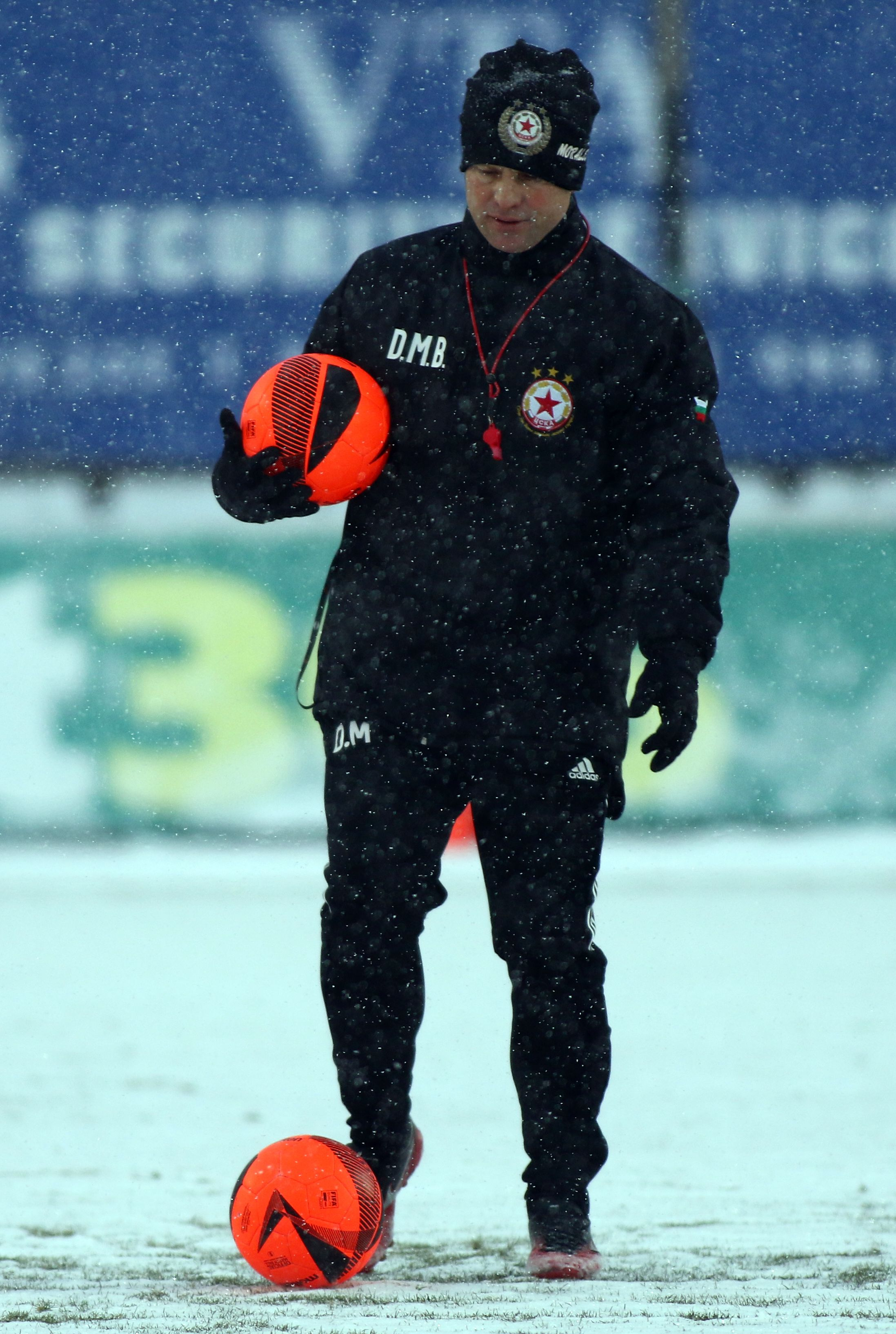

Personal information
- Full name: Daniel Alexandre Morales Batagello
- Date of birth: 6 December 1975 (age 50)
- Place of birth: Jaú, São Paulo, Brazil
- Height: 1.77 m (5 ft 9 1/2 in)
- Position: Defensive midfielder

Team information
- Current team: Spartak Varna (manager)

Youth career
- XV de Jaú

Senior career*
Years	Team	Apps	(Gls)
1993–1997	XV de Jaú		
1998	Mogi Mirim		
1998	Fernandópolis		
1999–2000	Garça		
2000–2002	Coritiba	21	(3)
2002–2004	Naftex Burgas	35	(6)
2004–2005	Lokomotiv Plovdiv	9	(0)
2005–2006	Cherno More	19	(3)
2006–2007	CSKA Sofia	10	(1)
2007–2008	Lokomotiv Plovdiv	19	(0)
2008–2009	Spartak Varna	27	(7)
2009	Lokomotiv Mezdra	13	(0)

Managerial career
- 2013–2016: Litex Lovech (youth coach)
- 2016–2019: CSKA Sofia (youth coach)
- 2016–2018: → CSKA Sofia (assistant)
- 2019: → CSKA Sofia (assistant)
- 2020–2021: CSKA Sofia (assistant)
- 2020: CSKA Sofia (caretaker)
- 2021–2022: Botev Vratsa
- 2022: CSKA 1948 III
- 2022–2023: Botev Vratsa
- 2024–2025: Belasitsa Petrich
- 2025: CSKA Sofia II (caretaker)
- 2025–2026: CSKA Sofia III
- 2026: CSKA Sofia (caretaker)
- 2026: CSKA Sofia III
- 2026–: Spartak Varna
- * Club domestic league appearances and goals

Daniel Alexandre Morales Batagello (born 6 December 1975) is a Brazilian former footballer, who typically played as a defensive midfielder, and now manager.

== Playing career ==
After spending the first nine years of his career in his home country with XV de Jau, Mogi Mirim, Fernandópolis, Garça FC and Coritiba, Morales relocated to Bulgaria in December 2002, signing a contract with Naftex Burgas. During playing at Brazil Morales earned 200 appearances, scored twenty goals. He made his competitive debut for Naftex on 15 March 2003 against Cherno More Varna in the seventeen round of the Bulgarian top division. In the next season (2003–04), Morales earned 27 appearances playing in the A Group, scored six goals and provided seven assists. On 13 February 2004 he scored two goals and provided one assist in a match against Bulgarian champions CSKA Sofia. The result of the match was a 3-3 draw.

In June 2004 Daniel joined the defended A Group champions Lokomotiv Plovdiv for a fee of 100 000 €. He wears shirt number twenty-eight for Loko. Morales made his debut for Loko Plovdiv on 15 August 2004 against his previous team Naftex.

In season 2004/05 he played in only 9 matches and in summer'2005 signed with Cherno More Varna. Morales fast becomes part of the starting team of Cherno More. The Brazilian player is uncompromising in defense and very dangerous in attack. In December 2006 he was honored as Footballer of the Year of Varna. One month later he transferred to the most successful Bulgarian football team - CSKA Sofia. For six months in CSKA Morales earned 10 appearances playing in the A PFG, scoring one goal. In season 2007/08 he played in Lokomotiv Plovdiv. On 3 August 2008 Morales signed a one-and-a-half-year contract with Spartak Varna. In the season 2008-09 he earned 27 appearances playing in the A Group, scored seven goals and provided two assists. In June 2009 Morales signed with Lokomotiv Mezdra, where he retired after a season.

== Managerial career ==
From 2010 to 2011 he was scout in Chernomorets Burgas. In October 2010 he founded his own youth academy in Burgas. From 2013 Morales works at Litex as youth coach, before moving to the CSKA Sofia academy in 2016, after the take over of Grisha Ganchev.

=== CSKA Sofia ===
==== Yourth coach and assistant role ====
On 27 November 2016, following the resignation of Edward Iordănescu, Stamen Belchev was appointed as interim manager of CSKA Sofia, while Morales was announces as his assistant. On 3 January 2017 both were confirmed to become a permanent manager and assistant of the team. Between 2016 and 2018 Morales was again manager of youth sectors of the team, before Lyuboslav Penev appointment as manager of CSKA Sofia for a third time on 8 February 2019 on whom Daniem become an assistant. He was later assistant under Dobromir Mitov and Stamen Belchev.

==== Caretaker role and assistance under Akrapović ====
In November 2021 Morales was announced as an interim manager of CSKA. He led the team in 4 matches, 2 of them in the Europa League against Roma and Young Boys. After Bruno Akrapović was announced as the new manager of the team on 11 November 2021, he once again stepped down as an assistant.

On 2 April 2021, after 5 years in CSKA Sofia, Morales left the club due to mutual agreement.

=== Head coach ===
On 9 June 2021, Morales was announced as the new manager of Bulgarian First League team of Botev Vratsa. On 10 June 2022 he was announced as the new manager of CSKA 1948 III. In April 2024, Morales became the manager of B PFG club Belasitsa Petrich, where he remained until June 2025.

== Managerial statistics ==
As of 21 November 2026

Team	From	To	Record							
Team	From	To	G	W	D	L	Win %	GF	GA	GD
(Bulgaria) CSKA Sofia (caretaker)	1 November 2020	11 November 2020	4	2	1	1	50.00	3	4	-1
(Bulgaria) Botev Vratsa	9 June 2021	22 March 2022	24	4	7	13	16.67	22	43	-21
(Bulgaria) CSKA 1948 III	10 June 2022	12 September 2022	6	2	1	3	33.33	9	8	+1
(Bulgaria) Botev Vratsa	13 September 2022	18 September 2023	34	8	7	19	23.53	21	59	-38
(Bulgaria) Belasitsa Petrich	17 April 2024	8 June 2025	45	20	8	17	44.44	52	55	+14
(Bulgaria) CSKA Sofia II (caretaker)	21 September 2025	24 September 2025	1	1	0	0	100.00	4	1	+3
(Bulgaria) CSKA Sofia III	24 September 2025	10 September 2026	32	14	8	10	43.75	43	34	+9
(Bulgaria) CSKA Sofia (caretaker)	10 September 2026	29 September 2026	3	2	1	0	66.67	7	2	+5
(Bulgaria) CSKA Sofia III	4 October 2026	3 November 2026	5	1	2	2	20.00	4	4	0
(Bulgaria) Spartak Varna	3 November 2026	Present	2	1	1	0	50.00	3	2	+1
Total			156	56	36	64	35.90	168	212	-44

== Personal life ==
In April 2009, he received a Bulgarian passport, having also Brazilian and Italian passports.
