= Lino (footballer, born 1976) =

Guinea-Bissauan footballer

Personal information
- Full name: Adelino Augusto Lopes
- Date of birth: 21 November 1976 (age 49)
- Place of birth: Bissau, Guinea-Bissau
- Height: 1.69 m (5 ft 7 in)
- Position: Right back

Youth career
- 1993–1995: Porto

Senior career*
Years	Team	Apps	(Gls)
1995–1998	Varzim	86	(15)
1998–2003	Marítimo	76	(2)
1999–2002	Marítimo B	5	(0)
2003–2004	Portimonense	27	(1)
2004–2005	Lusitânia	8	(0)
2005	Assyriska	3	(0)
2006	Cherno More	11	(0)
2006–2007	Beroe	24	(2)
2007–2009	Lokomotiv Sofia	20	(0)
Total		260	(20)

International career
1996–2001	Guinea-Bissau	36	(2)
- * Club domestic league appearances and goals

Adelino Augusto Lopes (born 21 November 1976 in Bissau), commonly known as Lino, is a Guinea-Bissauan former professional footballer who played as a right back.
