= Krasimir Kolev =

Bulgarian footballer

Personal information
- Full name: Krasimir Kolev
- Date of birth: 7 November 1971 (age 54)
- Place of birth: Dobrich, Bulgaria
- Height: 1.82 m (5 ft 11 1/2 in)
- Position: Goalkeeper

Youth career
- 1981–1991: Dobrudzha Dobrich

Senior career*
Years	Team	Apps	(Gls)
1990–1991	CSKA Sofia	0	(0)
1991–1993	Dobrudzha Dobrich	40	(0)
1993–1995	Lokomotiv Plovdiv	59	(0)
1995–1997	Levski Sofia	12	(0)
1997–1999	Proodeftiki FC	28	(0)
1999–2003	Spartak Varna	60	(0)
2003–2010	Cherno More	66	(0)
2010–2012	Topolite		
- * Club domestic league appearances and goals

Krasimir Kolev (Bulgarian: Красимир Колев) (born 7 November 1971) is a former Bulgarian goalkeeper, who currently works as a goalkeepers' coach. He previously worked for Cherno More Varna until 2012 and is now goalkeeper coach for Levski Sofia. Kolev also previously played for Proodeftiki F.C. in the Greek Alpha Ethniki.
