= Todor Simov =

Bulgarian footballer (born 1985)

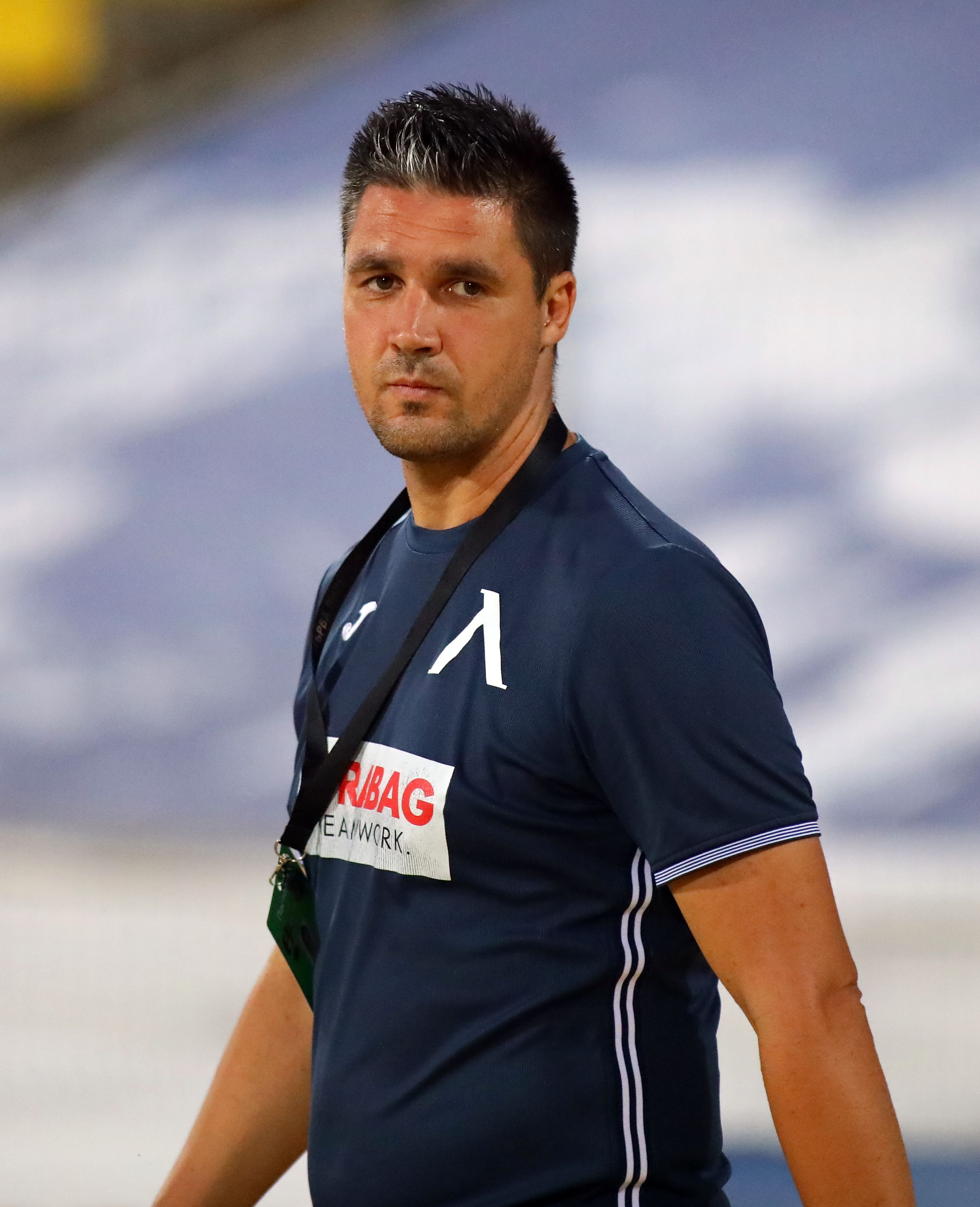

Personal information
- Full name: Todor Lyubomirov Simov
- Date of birth: 26 January 1985 (age 41)
- Place of birth: Sofia, Bulgaria
- Height: 1.87 m (6 ft 1 1/2 in)
- Position: Striker

Team information
- Current team: Botev Vratsa (manager)

Youth career
- Levski Sofia

Senior career*
Years	Team	Apps	(Gls)
2002–2003	Rossanese	19	(6)
2003–2005	Levski Sofia	0	(0)
2004–2005	→ Cherno More (loan)	26	(3)
2005	Vidima-Rakovski	7	(0)
2006	Cherno More	13	(1)
2006–2007	Beroe	19	(8)
2008	Sportist	12	(6)
2008–2009	Lokomotiv Mezdra	2	(0)
2009	Sportist	7	(1)
2010	Pirin Blagoevgrad	2	(0)

Managerial career
- 2012–2017: Levski Sofia (youth coach)
- 2017–2023: Levski Sofia (assistant)
- 2021: Levski Sofia (caretaker)
- 2023–2024: Bulgaria U16
- 2023–2025: Bulgaria U17
- 2024–2025: Bulgaria U19
- 2025–: Botev Vratsa
- * Club domestic league appearances and goals as of 18 February 2010

Todor Simov (Bulgarian: Тодор Симов; born 26 January 1985 in Sofia) is a former Bulgarian football striker. He is currently working as coach of Botev Vratsa.
