= Viktor Sofroniev =

Bulgarian footballer

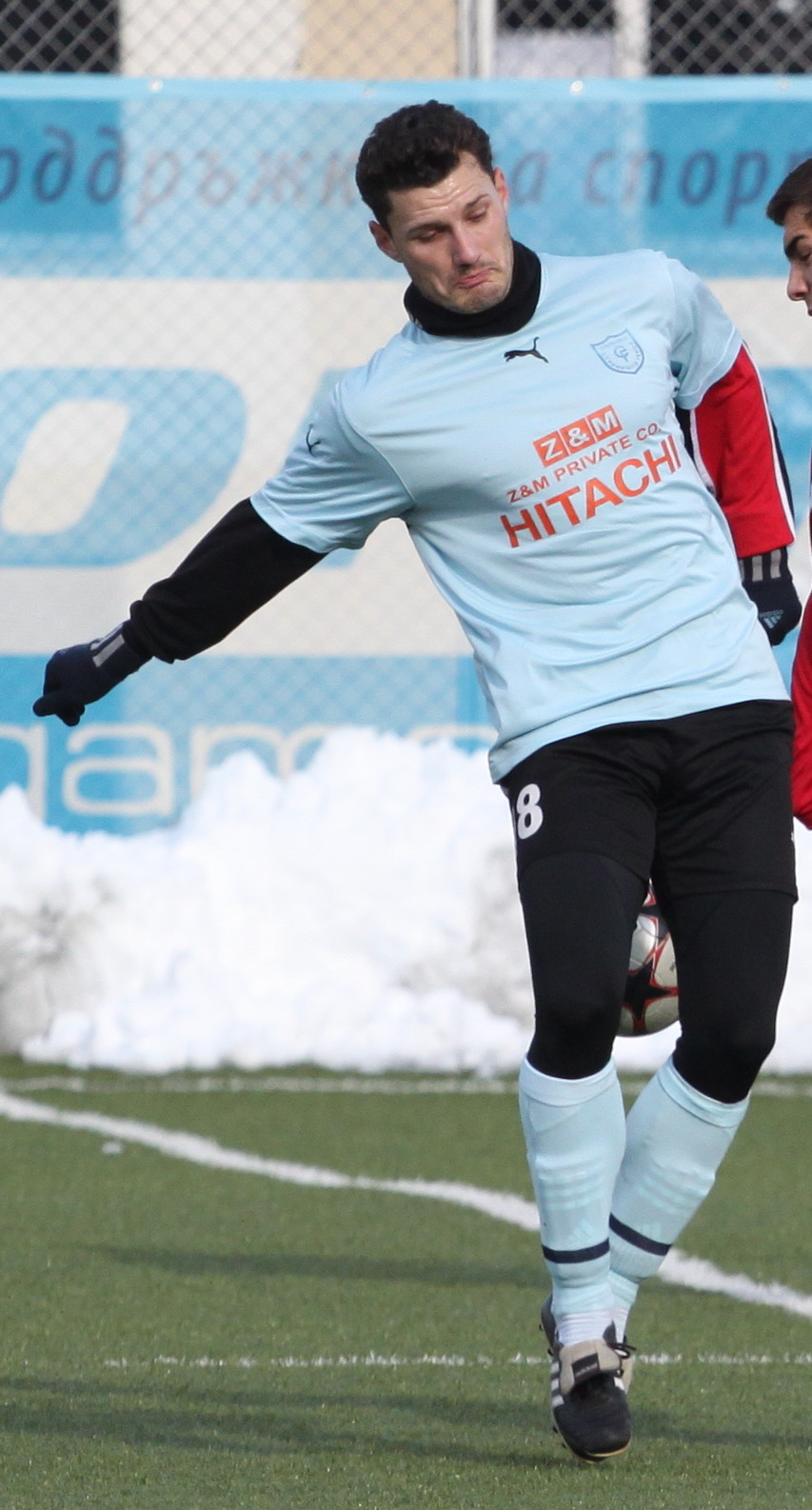

Personal information
- Full name: Viktor Sofroniev Sofroniev
- Date of birth: 4 April 1981 (age 45)
- Place of birth: Varna, Bulgaria
- Height: 1.83 m (6 ft 0 in)
- Position: Midfielder

Youth career
- Spartak Varna

Senior career*
Years	Team	Apps	(Gls)
1999–2001	Spartak Varna		
2001–2003	Aksakovo		
2003–2006	Vihren Sandanski	62	(4)
2008–2009	Rodopa Smolyan	11	(1)
2009	→ Belasitsa Petrich (loan)	13	(1)
2009–2010	Lokomotiv Mezdra	18	(1)
2010	Botev Krivodol	12	(1)
2011–2012	Beroe Stara Zagora	5	(0)
2013	Minyor Pernik	12	(0)
- * Club domestic league appearances and goals as of 23 August 2021

Viktor Sofroniev (Bulgarian: Виктор Софрониев; born 4 April 1981) is a Bulgarian former professional footballer who played as a defensive midfielder. His first club was Spartak Varna.
