= Valentin Iliev =

Bulgarian footballer and manager

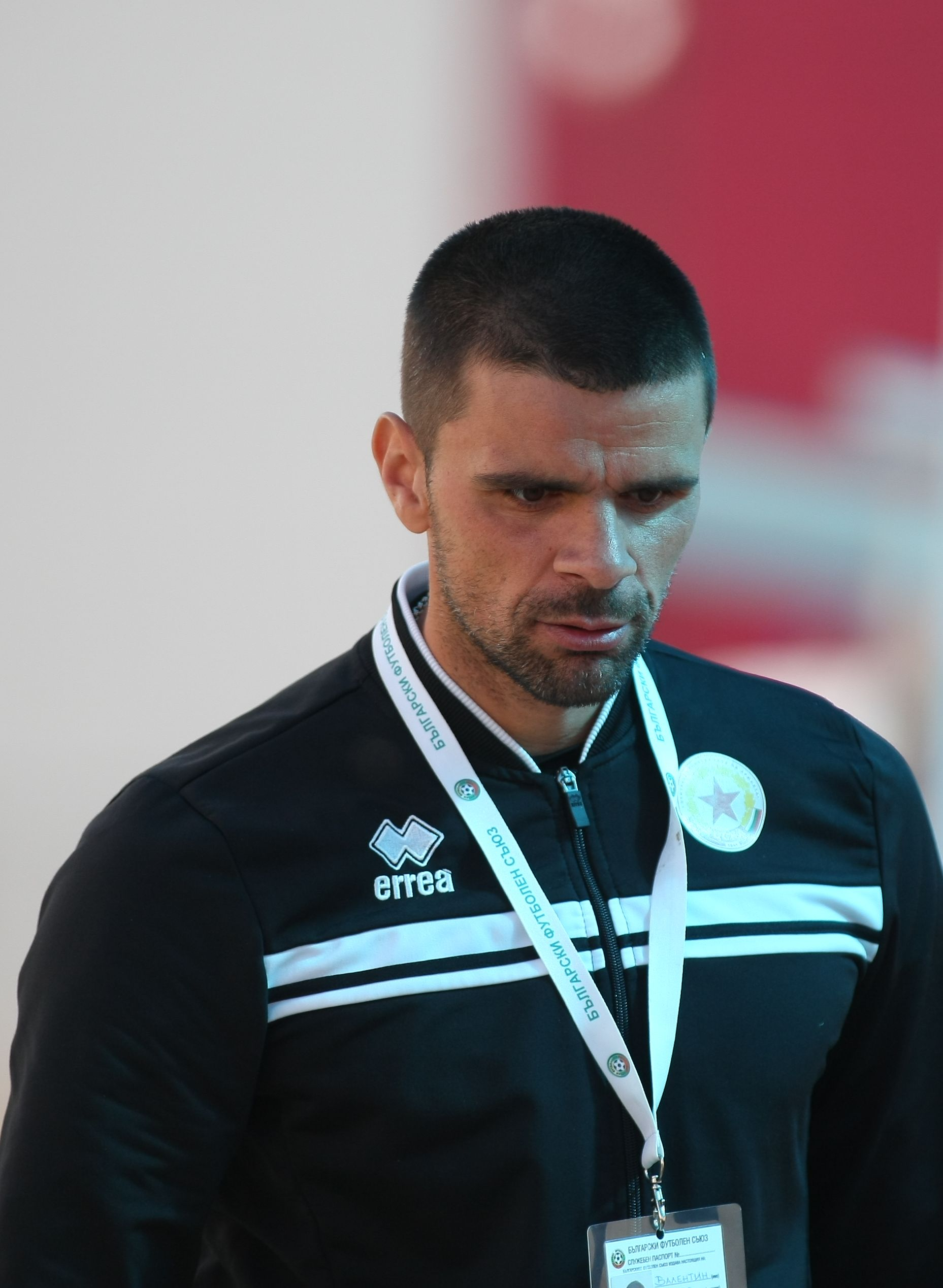

Personal information
- Full name: Valentin Iliev Ivanov
- Date of birth: 11 July 1980 (age 46)
- Place of birth: Knezha, Bulgaria
- Height: 6 ft 1 in (1.85 m)
- Position: Centre back

Senior career*
Years	Team	Apps	(Gls)
1999–2001	Botev Vratsa	37	(3)
2002–2004	Metalurh Zaporizhzhia	21	(1)
2002–2004	→ Metalurh-2 Zaporizhzhia	4	(0)
2004–2007	CSKA Sofia	79	(7)
2008–2009	Terek Grozny	47	(5)
2010	Universitatea Craiova	25	(6)
2011–2012	Steaua București	26	(4)
2012–2013	Volyn Lutsk	18	(0)
2013–2015	CSKA Sofia	40	(5)
2015–2016	Universitatea Craiova	20	(1)
Total		317	(32)

International career
2005–2013	Bulgaria	23	(0)

Managerial career
- 2016–2018: CSKA 1948
- 2018–2019: Universitatea Craiova (assistant)
- 2019–2021: Botev Vratsa (assistant)
- 2021: Tsarsko Selo Sofia (assistant)
- 2022: CSKA 1948 II
- 2023: Spartak Varna
- 2023–2024: CSKA 1948 II
- 2024: CSKA 1948
- 2025: CSKA Sofia II
- 2025: CSKA Sofia (caretaker)
- 2025–2026: CSKA Sofia II
- * Club domestic league appearances and goals

Valentin Iliev Ivanov (Bulgarian: Валентин Илиев Иванов; born 11 August 1980) is a Bulgarian professional football and former player who is currently in charge of CSKA Sofia II.

== Personal life ==
Iliev's father, Iliya Valov, was goalkeeper for CSKA and Bulgaria's national team.

== Playing career ==
=== Early career ===
Iliev started his career in his home town Vratsa, where he played for the local team Botev Vratsa. In June 2001 he signed with Ukrainian club Metalurg from Zaporizhzhya, where he played 21 matches and scored one goal.

=== CSKA Sofia ===
In November 2004, Iliev joined CSKA Sofia. He collected his first A Group title winner's medal at the end of the 2004–05 season. Iliev scored 4 league goals in 18 matches that season.

On 23 August 2005, Iliev scored a goal, which helped CSKA secure a historic 1–0 away win over Liverpool in the third qualifying round of the Champions League. However, it did not help them qualify for the Champions League group phase, as the "armymen" were eliminated after an aggregate score of 2–3, having lost their home game. He developed a knack for scoring key goals for CSKA, making good use of his powerful heading ability. In April 2006, Iliev was given the captain's armband, as Emil Gargorov was stripped from that role as a result of loss in the Eternal derby of Bulgarian football against Levski Sofia.

In July 2006, it was announced that Iliev would be CSKA's permanent club captain. On 30 July, he captained the team that won the 2006 Bulgarian Supercup against Levski Sofia. Iliev helped CSKA to keep a clean sheet throughout the match, as they defeated Levski 3–0 on penalties. On 28 September 2006, he scored his second-ever European goal in a 2–2 home draw (after extra time) against Beşiktaş in the first round of the 2006–07 UEFA Cup.

Despite some disciplinary issues, most notably his physical confrontation with Jose Emilio Furtado in May 2007, resulting in Iliev being stripped of the CSKA captaincy, he remained a cult figure for CSKA fans.

=== Terek Grozny ===
Iliev signed with Russian side Terek Grozny in February 2008 on a two-and-a-half-year deal for a reported fee of €750,000. His first goal in the Russian Premier League came on 3 August, scoring the only goal in a 1–0 home win over Saturn Ramenskoye. On 23 August, he scored the winning goal for a 2–1 win against Lokomotiv Moscow. On 2 November 2008, Iliev scored another vital goal, this time a last-minute equaliser, in a 1–1 home draw against FC Moscow.

Iliev left Terek in February 2010, cancelling his contract by mutual agreement two months before it expired.

=== Universitatea Craiova ===
On 11 February 2010, Iliev signed a one-and-a-half-year contract with Romanian club Universitatea Craiova as a free agent.

=== Steaua București ===
In February 2011, Iliev signed a contract for one and a half years with Steaua București. On 19 December 2011, Iliev scored his first goal for Steaua against CSU Vointa Sibiu in a Liga 1 match, goal which proved to be decisive.

=== Volyn Lutsk ===
On 12 July 2012, Iliev joined Ukrainian club Volyn Lutsk on a two-year deal.

=== Return to CSKA Sofia ===
On 16 July 2013, Iliev re-signed with CSKA Sofia and was announced as CSKA's new club captain. He made his second CSKA debut in a 0–0 home draw against Cherno More on 3 August. Iliev scored his first goal since his return to the club on 24 August, scoring an equaliser, away to Lokomotiv Sofia in a 1–1 draw. On 16 April 2014, he signed a one-year contract extension, keeping him at CSKA until 30 June 2015. He ended 2013–14 season with 4 goals in 28 matches.

In October 2014, Iliev underwent an ankle surgery on his right foot. Following surgery, he was ruled out for about three months. He returned to first team action in April 2015.

=== Universitatea Craiova ===
On 29 September 2015, Iliev signed a one-year contract with Romanian club Universitatea Craiova as a free agent.

== International career ==
In October 2010, after a long absence from the national team, Iliev was recalled to the national side by the new manager Lothar Matthäus for the Euro 2012 qualifier against Wales. On 8 October 2010, he started the match, but sustained an injury during the first half and was replaced by Pavel Vidanov.

== Managerial career ==
Iliev joined CSKA 1948 in 2016 and oversaw successive promotions, from the fourth tier to the Second League. He was sacked after four matches of the 2018–19 season.

== Outside football ==
Iliev is a sexton at a church in Bistritsa.

== Career statistics ==
=== Club ===
As of 31 May 2015

Appearances and goals by club, season and competition
Club	Season	League			National cup (Note: Includes Bulgarian Cup, Russian Cup, Cupa României)		Europe		Other		Total	
Club	Season	Division	Apps	Goals	Apps	Goals	Apps	Goals	Apps	Goals	Apps	Goals
CSKA Sofia	2004–05	A Group	18	4	0	0	—		—		18	4
CSKA Sofia	2005–06	A Group	24	1	3	0	8 (Note: Three appearances and one goal in UEFA Champions League, five appearances in UEFA Cup)	1	1 (Note: Appearance in Bulgarian Supercup)	0	36	2
CSKA Sofia	2006–07	A Group	23	1	2	0	5 (Note: Appearances in UEFA Cup)	1	1	0	31	2
CSKA Sofia	2007–08	A Group	14	1	1	0	3	0	—		18	1
CSKA Sofia	Total		79	7	6	0	16	2	2	0	103	9
Terek Grozny	2008	Russian Premier League	25	3	0	0	—		—		25	3
Terek Grozny	2009	Russian Premier League	22	2	0	0	—		—		22	2
Terek Grozny	Total		47	5	0	0	0	0	0	0	47	5
Universitatea Craiova	2009–10	Liga I	15	3	0	0	—		—		15	3
Universitatea Craiova	2010–11	Liga I	10	3	0	0	—		—		10	3
Universitatea Craiova	Total		25	6	0	0	0	0	0	0	25	6
Steaua București	2010–11	Liga I	4	0	1	0	0	0	—		5	0
Steaua București	2011–12	Liga I	22	4	2	0	6 (Note: Appearances in UEFA Europa League)	0	—		30	4
Steaua București	Total		26	4	3	0	6	0	0	0	35	4
Volyn Lutsk	2012–13	Ukrainian Premier League	18	0	0	0	—		—		18	0
CSKA Sofia	2013–14	A Group	28	4	4	0	—		—		32	4
CSKA Sofia	2014–15	A Group	12	1	0	0	0	0	—		12	1
CSKA Sofia	Total		40	5	4	0	0	0	0	0	44	5
Career total			235	27	13	0	22	2	2	0	272	29

== Managerial statistics ==
As of 23 May 2026

Managerial record by team and tenure
Team	From	To	Record							
Team	From	To	G	W	D	L	Win %	GF	GA	GD
CSKA 1948	2 September 2016	21 August 2018	60	52	8	0	86.67	205	26	179
CSKA 1948 II	30 May 2022	14 December 2022	17	10	5	2	58.82	31	9	22
Spartak Varna	6 June 2023	22 August 2023	6	3	1	2	50.00	4	5	-1
CSKA 1948 II	21 September 2023	5 April 2024	17	6	6	5	35.29	15	16	-1
CSKA 1948	5 April 2024	29 October 2024	27	9	11	7	33.33	28	27	1
CSKA Sofia II	16 September 2025	20 September 2025	0	0	0	0	—	0	0	0
CSKA Sofia (caretaker)	20 September 2025	24 September 2025	1	0	1	0	0.00	1	1	0
CSKA Sofia II	24 September 2025	27 July 2026	23	13	5	5	56.52	44	19	15
Career total			151	93	37	21	61.59	328	103	225

== Honours ==
CSKA Sofia

- First Professional Football League: 2004–05
- Bulgarian Cup: 2005–06
- Bulgarian Supercup: 2006

Steaua București

- Cupa României: 2010–11

Individual

- Best A PFG defender: 2005
