= Inzaghi Donígio =

Bissau-Guinean footballer

Inzaghi
Personal information
- Full name: Inzaghi Donígio
- Date of birth: 25 April 1985 (age 41)
- Place of birth: Bissau, Guinea-Bissau
- Height: 1.78 m (5 ft 10 in)
- Position: Forward

Youth career
- 2000–2003: União Lamas

Senior career*
Years	Team	Apps	(Gls)
2003–2005	União Lamas	74	(6)
2005	Ovarense	10	(4)
2006–2008	Benfica	0	(0)
2006	→ Cherno More (loan)	23	(2)
2007	→ Vitória Setúbal (loan)	7	(0)
2007–2008	→ Chaves (loan)	27	(2)
2008–2009	Sanjoanense	10	(0)
2009–2010	Lourosa	16	(0)
2010–2011	Minyor Pernik	0	(0)
2011	Peniche	2	(0)
2011–2012	Atlético Reguengos	20	(4)
2012–2013	Mirandela	8	(1)
2013	Kukësi	1	(1)
Total		198	(19)
- * Club domestic league appearances and goals

Inzaghi Donígio (born 25 April 1985), known as Inzaghi, is a former Bissau-Guinean footballer who played as a forward.

== Football career ==
Inzaghi was born in Bissau. After solid displays still in his teens at C.F. União de Lamas – the club was at the time in the second division – he signed with country giants S.L. Benfica in January 2006, after beginning the season at A.D. Ovarense also in the second level.

Inzaghi never appeared officially for the first team, being loaned to PFC Cherno More Varna the following month and reaching the final of the Bulgarian Cup in his first year. From January 2007 to June 2008 he would serve two loans, the first one at Vitória de Setúbal, making his Primeira Liga debut on 25 February 2007 as he started in a 1–1 home draw against C.D. Nacional and playing in a further six matches as a substitute.

Released from Benfica in the summer of 2008, Inzaghi resumed his career in the lower leagues of Portugal. After an unassuming spell in the Albanian Superliga, he retired at the age of only 28 due to recurrent knee injuries.
