= Radoslav Rangelov =

Bulgarian footballer

Personal information
- Full name: Radoslav Rangelov
- Date of birth: 18 September 1985 (age 41)
- Place of birth: Sofia, Bulgaria
- Height: 1.78 m (5 ft 10 in)
- Position: Midfielder

Youth career
- 1997–2004: Levski Sofia

Senior career*
Years	Team	Apps	(Gls)
2004–2011	Slavia Sofia	58	(4)
- * Club domestic league appearances and goals as of 1 August 2007 ‡ National team caps and goals as of 1 August 2007

Radoslav Rangelov (born 18 September 1985) is a Bulgarian footballer, who plays as a midfielder.
