= Kristiyan Hristiyanov =

Bulgarian footballer

Personal information
- Full name: Kristiyan Krasimirov Hristiyanov
- Date of birth: 11 September 1978 (age 48)
- Place of birth: Shumen, Bulgaria
- Height: 1.93 m (6 ft 4 in)
- Position: Forward

Team information
- Current team: Nesebar
- Number: 30

Senior career*
Years	Team	Apps	(Gls)
1998–2000	Volov Shumen	28	(3)
2001	Dunav Ruse	9	(0)
2001	Devnya	11	(2)
2002–2003	Chernomorets Burgas	17	(2)
2004	Volov Shumen	13	(1)
2004	Chernomorets Burgas	2	(0)
2005–2006	Volov Shumen	39	(19)
2006–2009	Dunav Ruse	67	(12)
2009–2010	Volov Shumen	17	(5)
2010–	Nesebar	3	(0)
- * Club domestic league appearances and goals as of 30 August 2010

Kristiyan Hristiyanov (Bulgarian: Кристиян Християнов) (born 11 September 1978) is a Bulgarian footballer currently (as of July 2010) playing for OFC Nesebar as a forward. In 2010, he played for Volov football club and previously for Dunav.
