= Martin Hristov (footballer, born 1980) =

Bulgarian footballer

Personal information
- Full name: Martin Hristov Dimitrov
- Date of birth: 6 December 1980 (age 45)
- Place of birth: Bulgaria
- Height: 1.79 m (5 ft 10 1/2 in)
- Position: Winger

Senior career*
Years	Team	Apps	(Gls)
1998	Cherno More	6	(0)
1999–2002	FC Devnya	55	(13)
2002–2005	Svetkavitsa	67	(15)
2005–2007	Cherno More	35	(4)
2007	Slavia Sofia	4	(0)
2008	Vidima-Rakovski	13	(1)
2008	Svetkavitsa	8	(1)
2009	Petrolul Ploieşti		
2010–2011	Chernomorets Balchik	9	(2)
2011	Svetkavitsa	13	(0)
2013–2015	Ticha Dolni Chiflik	63	(48)

Managerial career
- 2012–: Cherno More (youth team)
- 2016–: Suvorovo
- * Club domestic league appearances and goals

Martin Hristov (Bulgarian: Мартин Христов; born 6 December 1980) is a Bulgarian former football winger. Hristov's first club was Cherno More Varna.
