= Mourad Hdiouad =

Moroccan footballer

Mourad Hdioaud
Personal information
- Date of birth: 10 September 1976 (age 50)
- Place of birth: Temara, Morocco
- Height: 1.84 m (6 ft 0 in)
- Position: Midfielder

Youth career
- 1998: Tembetary

Senior career*
Years	Team	Apps	(Gls)
1998–2001	FUS de Rabat		
2001–2006	Litex Lovech	108	(14)
2005–2006	CSKA Sofia	19	(7)
2006–2009	FC Augsburg	83	(11)

International career
2000–2005	Morocco	19	(0)
- * Club domestic league appearances and goals

Mourad Hdiouad (Arabic: مراد حدود; born 10 September 1976) is a Moroccan former professional footballer who played as a midfielder. He played 19 matches for the Moroccan national team, representing the country at the 2004 African Cup of Nations.

== Honours ==
Litex Lovech

- Bulgarian Cup: 2003–04

CSKA Sofia

- Bulgarian Cup: 2005–06
- Bulgarian Super Cup: 2006

Morocco

- Africa Cup of Nations second place: 2004
