= Veselin Vachev =

Bulgarian footballer

Personal information
- Full name: Veselin Vachev
- Date of birth: 1 April 1973 (age 53)
- Place of birth: Pleven, Bulgaria
- Height: 1.86 m (6 ft 1 in)
- Position: Defender

Youth career
- Spartak Pleven

Senior career*
Years	Team	Apps	(Gls)
1992–1997	Spartak Pleven	77	(8)
1997–2000	Levski Sofia	24	(0)
2000–2003	Slavia Sofia	90	(2)
2003–2004	Levski Sofia	4	(0)
2004–2007	Cherno More	60	(4)
2007–2008	Kaliakra Kavarna	22	(0)
2008	Nesebar	11	(1)
2009	Volov Shumen	13	(0)
Total		301	(15)
- * Club domestic league appearances and goals

Veselin Vachev (Bulgarian: Веселин Вачев; born 1 April 1973) is a Bulgarian former footballer who played as a defender.

His first club was Spartak Pleven. He plays in the centre of defense, when there are corners or free kicks he joins his teammates in attack.

== Awards ==
- Holder of the Bulgarian Cup 2000 (with PFC Levski Sofia)
- Champion of Bulgaria 2000 (with PFC Levski Sofia)
