= Georgi Vladimirov =

Bulgarian footballer

Personal information
- Full name: Georgi Vladimirov Georgiev
- Date of birth: 15 June 1976 (age 50)
- Place of birth: Montana, Bulgaria
- Height: 1.76 m (5 ft 9 1/2 in)
- Positions: Winger; forward

Senior career*
Years	Team	Apps	(Gls)
1995–1998	Montana	17	(4)
1998–1999	Shumen	26	(6)
1999	Litex Lovech	17	(4)
2000	Botev Plovdiv	27	(4)
2001–2005	Slavia Sofia	124	(35)
2005–2007	Cherno More	44	(10)
2007–2008	Inter Baku	11	(2)
2009	Montana	20	(1)
2009–2010	Lokomotiv Mezdra	1	(0)
2010	Bdin Vidin	1	(0)
2011	Chavdar Byala Slatina	3	(0)
Total		266	(61)

International career
2004	Bulgaria	1	(0)

Managerial career
- 2015–2017: Kariana Erden
- * Club domestic league appearances and goals

Georgi Vladimirov (Bulgarian: Георги Владимиров; born 15 June 1976) is a former Bulgarian footballer who played as a forward and now manager.

== Azerbaijan career statistics ==
Club performance			League		Cup		Continental		Total	
Season	Club	League	Apps	Goals	Apps	Goals	Apps	Goals	Apps	Goals
Azerbaijan			League		Azerbaijan Cup		Europe		Total	
2007-08	Inter Baku	Azerbaijan Premier League	11	2			-		11	2
Total	Azerbaijan		11	2			0	0	11	2
Career total			11	2			0	0	11	2
