= Petar Kostadinov =

Bulgarian footballer

Personal information
- Full name: Petar Nikolov Kostadinov
- Date of birth: 1 April 1978 (age 48)
- Place of birth: Dimitrovgrad, Bulgaria
- Height: 1.75 m (5 ft 9 in)
- Position: Defensive midfielder

Team information
- Current team: Cherno More (assistant)

Senior career*
Years	Team	Apps	(Gls)
1997–1999	Dimitrovgrad		
1999–2003	Chernomorets Burgas	65	(2)
2003–2008	Cherno More	114	(3)
2008–2011	Beroe Stara Zagora	70	(2)
Total		220	(6)

Managerial career
- 2013–2014: Vereya
- 2017: Vereya (assistant)
- 2018–: Cherno More (assistant)
- 2023–2025: Bulgaria (assistant)
- * Club domestic league appearances and goals

Petar Kostadinov (Bulgarian: Петър Костадинов; born 1 April 1978) is a former Bulgarian footballer who played as a midfielder.

== Playing style ==
Kostadinov possesses a combination of physical strength as well as endurance. He is a defender in midfield.

== Career ==
Born in Dimitrovgrad Kostadinov began played football in local team FC Dimitrovgrad. On 21-years old signed with Chernomorets Burgas and made his debut in A PFG - The Bulgarian first football division. He signed a 3-year deal with Cherno More Varna after being released from Chernomorets in 2003. He has been given the No.18 shirt. In 2006 Kostadinov renewed your contract with "the saylors" for additional three years. In June 2008 Kostadinov was transferred to Beroe Stara Zagora.

== Statistics ==
Club	Season	Appearances	Goals
Beroe	2009-10	24	1
Beroe	2008-09	17	0
Beroe	Total	41	1
Cherno More	2007-08	13	0
Cherno More	2006-07	23	0
Cherno More	2005-06	25	2
Cherno More	2004-05	27	1
Cherno More	2003-04	26	0
Cherno More	Total	114	3
Chernomorets	2002-03	5	0
Chernomorets	2001-02	34	0
Chernomorets	2000-01	8	1
Chernomorets	1999-00	18	1
Chernomorets	Total	65	2
Career Totals		220	6

== Honours ==
=== Club ===
- Cherno More
  - Bulgarian Cup:
    - Runner-up (2): 2005–06, 2007-08
- Beroe
  - Bulgarian Cup:
    - Winner: 2009-10
