= Stadion Hristo Botev (Blagoevgrad) =

Stadium in Blagoevgrad, Bulgaria

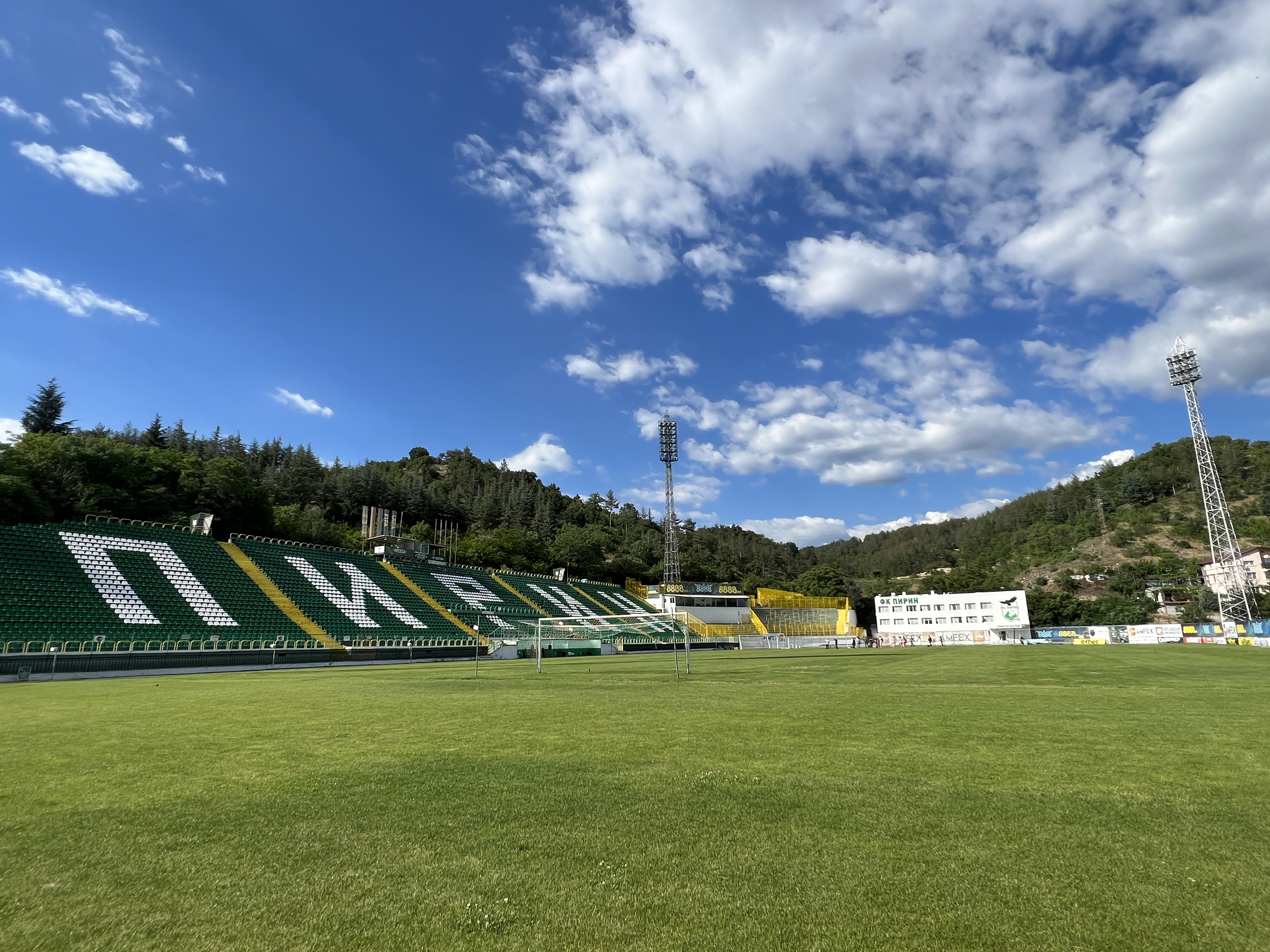
- Interactive map of Stadion Hristo Botev
- Full name: Hristo Botev Stadium
- Location: Blagoevgrad, Bulgaria
- Coordinates: 42°1′35″N 23°6′0″E
- Owner: Municipality of Blagoevgrad
- Operator: FC Pirin Blagoevgrad
- Capacity: 6,927
- Surface: Grass

Construction
- Groundbreaking: 1934
- Built: 1934
- Opened: 1934
- Renovated: 2009–2010
- Expanded: 2009

Tenants
- FC Pirin Blagoevgrad (1934–present); PFC Pirin Blagoevgrad (2006–2008)

Stadion Hristo Botev (Bulgarian: Стадион „Христо Ботев“, English: 'Hristo Botev Stadium') is a multi-purpose stadium, located in Blagoevgrad, Bulgaria. It is used for football matches and is home ground to FC Pirin Blagoevgrad. The stadium holds 11,000 spectators but is being expanded to 18,000. As of 2009, the stadium is being renovated and will be equipped with electric lightning. The renovation cost € 1,5 million and it was completed in 2010. Current stadium capacity 6,927 with 5,427 seats and 1,500 standing.

== Gallery ==
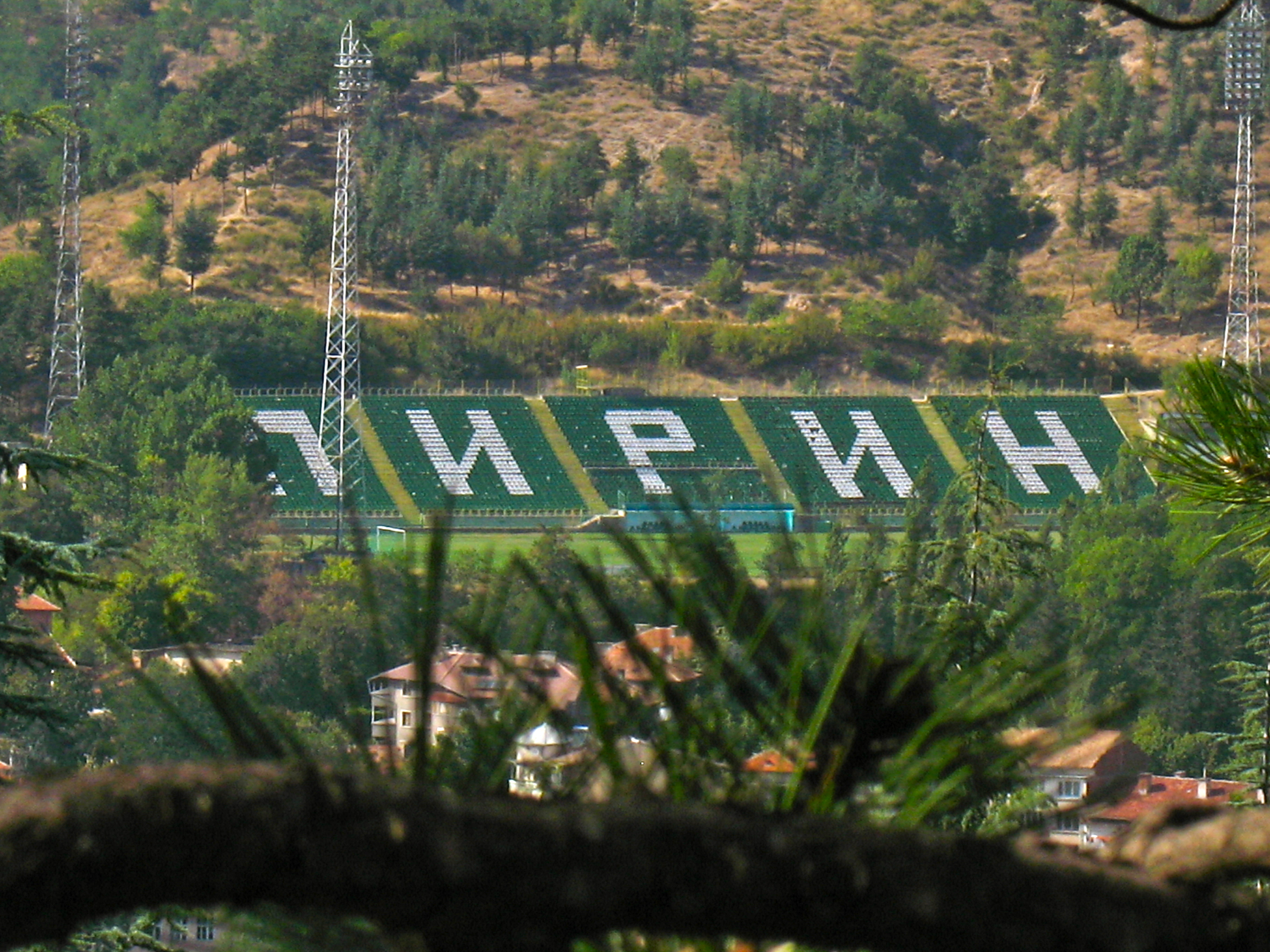
Hristo Botev Stadium in Blagoevgrad

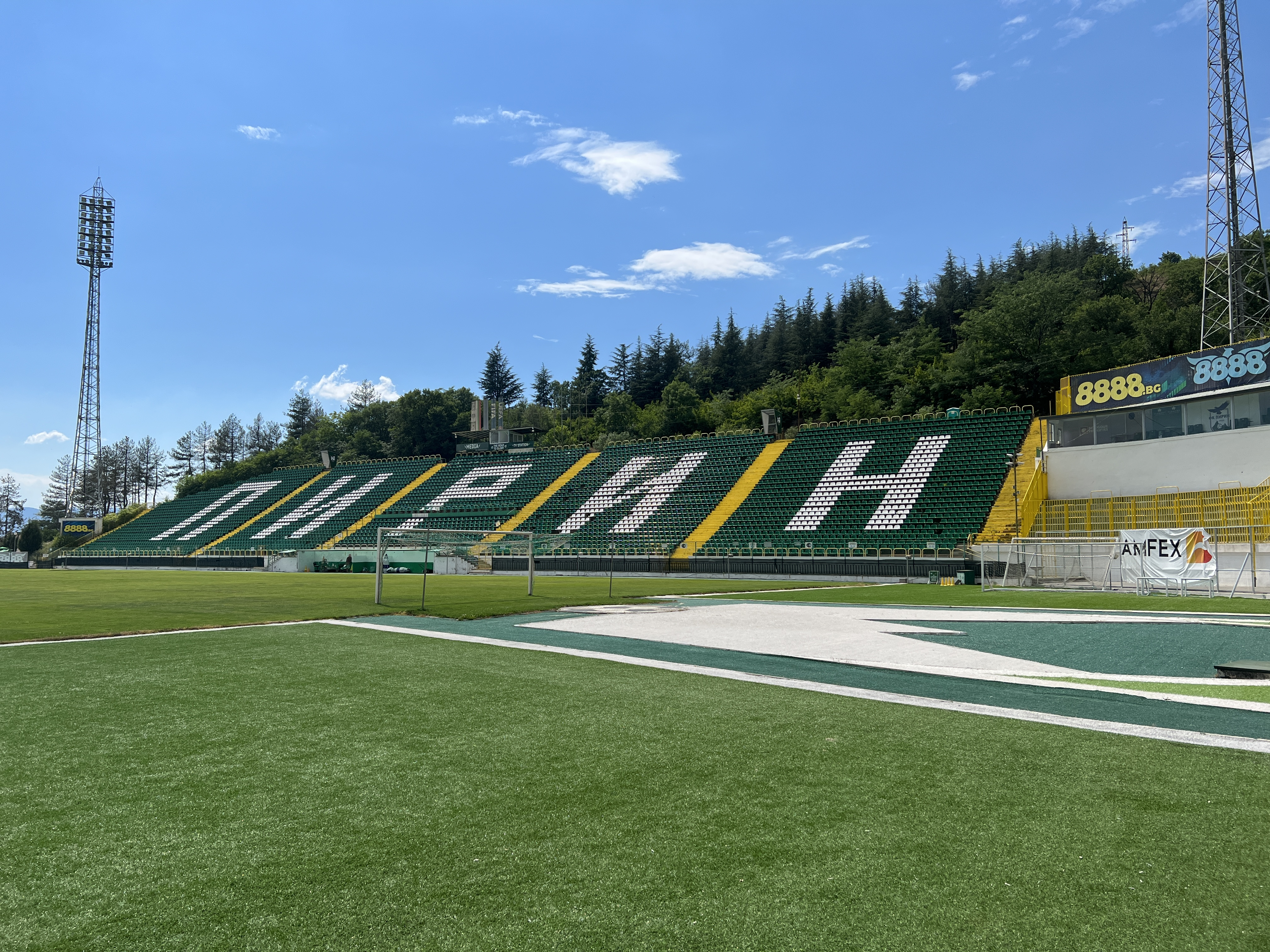
The renovated stadium in 2022

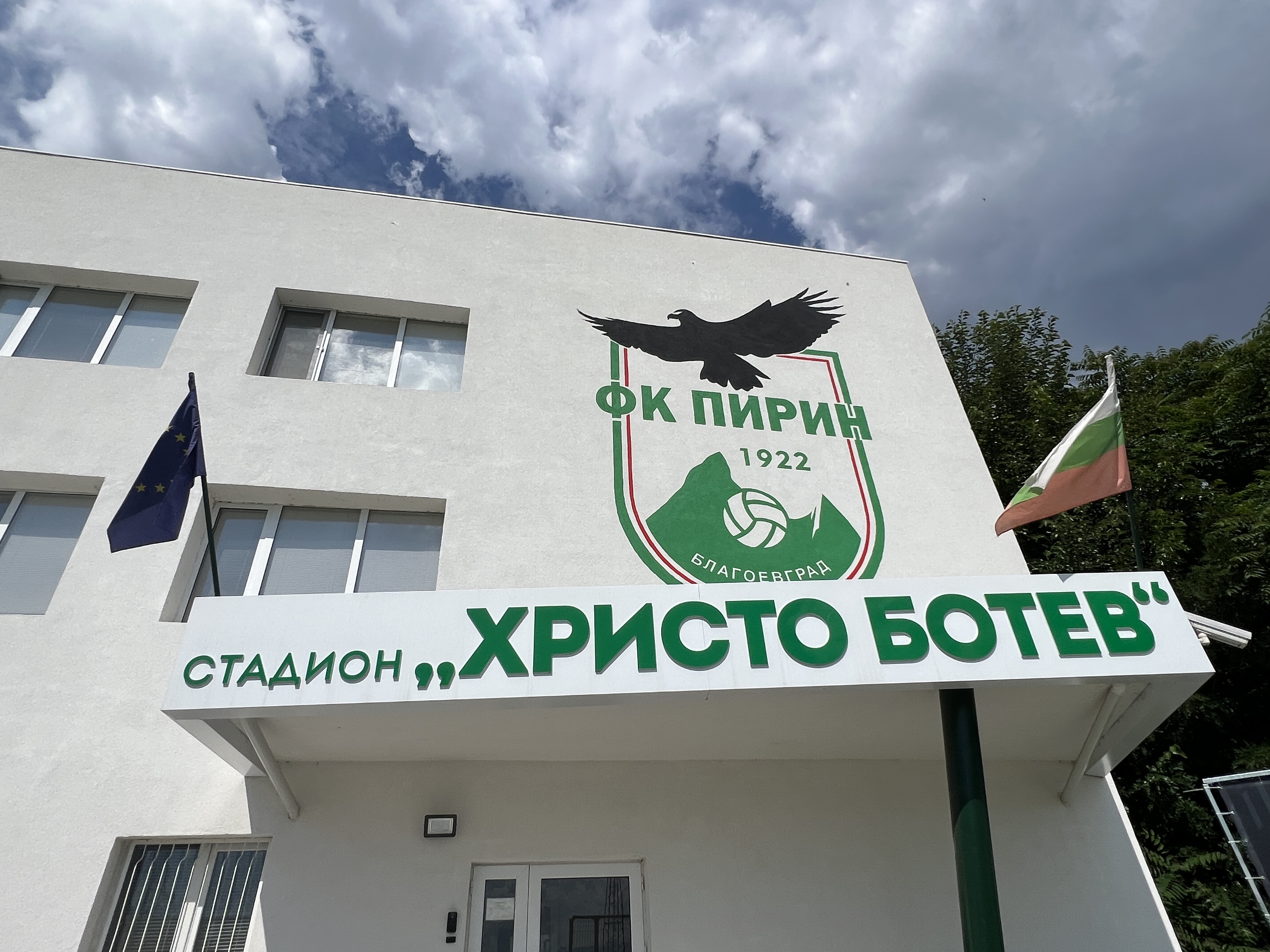
The renovated club house in 2022
