= Masena Moke =

Democratic Republic of the Congo footballer

Personal information
- Full name: Masena Matele Moke Ago
- Date of birth: 6 February 1980 (age 46)
- Place of birth: DR Congo
- Height: 1.85 m (6 ft 1 in)
- Position: Forward

Youth career
- 1992–1996: DSMP Congo

Senior career*
Years	Team	Apps	(Gls)
1997–1999	Gil Vicente		
2000–2002	CSKA Sofia	28	(3)
2002–2004	Beroe Stara Zagora	45	(22)
2004–2005	Dubay Kauchers	32	(16)
2006–2008	Cherno More	38	(11)
2008–2009	Vihren Sandanski	6	(1)
- * Club domestic league appearances and goals as of 31 May 2008 ‡ National team caps and goals as of 31 August 2006

Masena Moke (born 6 February 1980) is a former football forward from the Democratic Republic of Congo who last played for Bulgarian club Vihren Sandanski.

Moke has played for PFC CSKA Sofia, PFC Beroe Stara Zagora, PFC Cherno More Varna and Vihren Sandanski in the Bulgarian A PFG.
