= Guillaume Dah Zadi =

Ivorian footballer (born 1978)

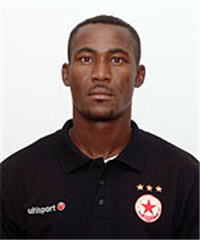

Personal information
- Date of birth: 1 January 1978 (age 48)
- Place of birth: Abidjan, Ivory Coast
- Height: 1.86 m (6 ft 1 in)
- Position: Forward

Youth career
- 1990–1995: Africa Sports d'Abidjan

Senior career*
Years	Team	Apps	(Gls)
1995–1996	Africa Sports d'Abidjan		
1997–1998	Satellite FC Abidjan		
1998–2001	Wydad Casablanca		
2001–2002	USM Annaba		
2002–2003	Wydad Casablanca	22	(4)
2003–2005	EOG Kram		
2005–2007	CSKA Sofia	32	(13)
2007–2008	Changchun Yatai	41	(19)

International career
2006	Ivory Coast	2	(4)
- * Club domestic league appearances and goals

Guillaume Dah Zadi (born 1 January 1978) is an Ivorian former professional footballer who played as a forward. His former clubs include Africa Sports d'Abidjan, Satellite FC Abidjan, USM Annaba, Wydad Casablanca, EOG Kram, CSKA Sofia and Changchun Yatai.
