= Emil Gargorov =

Bulgarian footballer

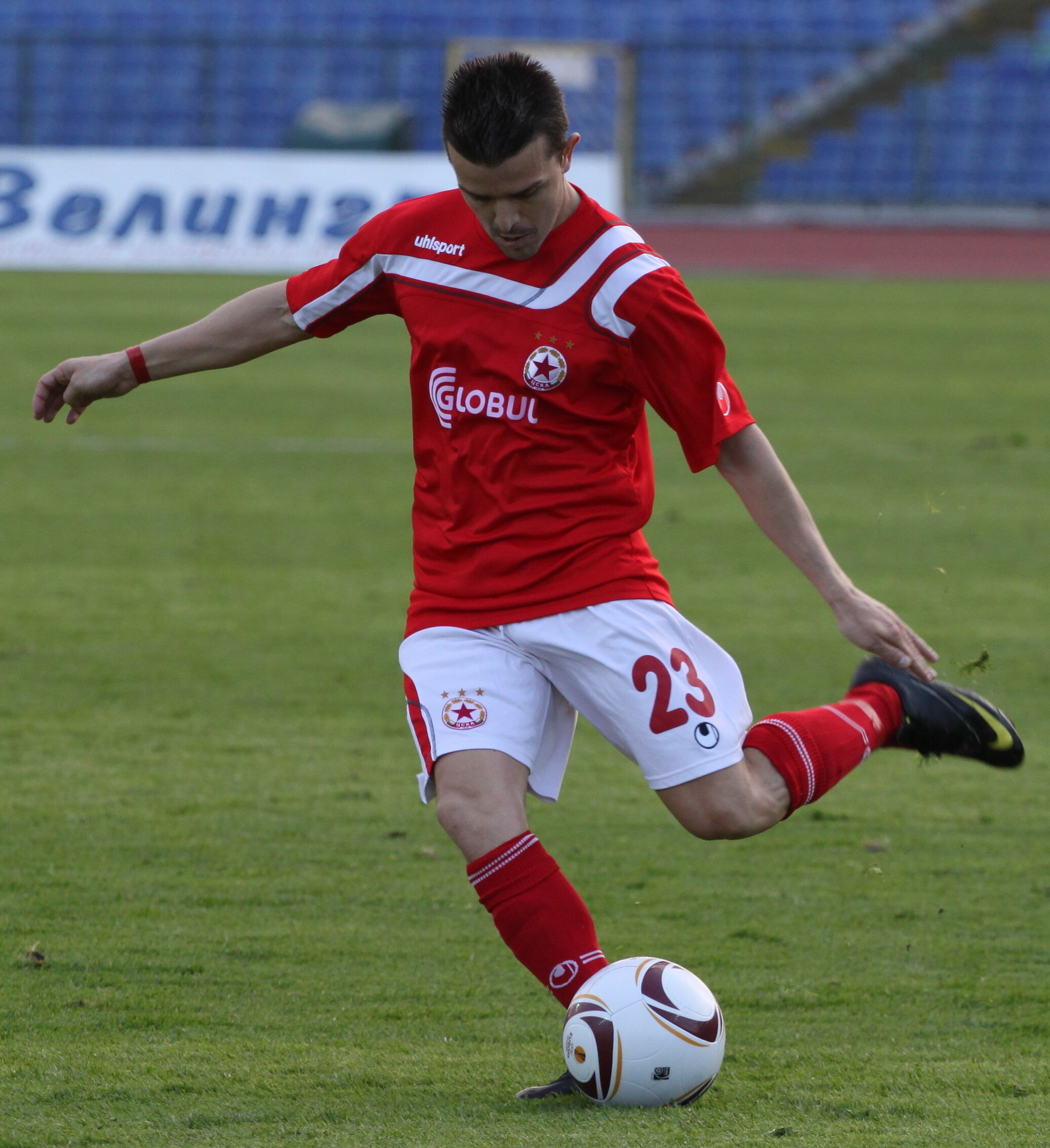
- Gargorov in 2011

Personal information
- Full name: Emil Nikolaev Gargorov
- Date of birth: 15 February 1981 (age 45)
- Place of birth: Sofia, Bulgaria
- Height: 1.68 m (5 ft 6 in)
- Position: Attacking midfielder

Youth career
- 1990–1999: Lokomotiv Sofia

Senior career*
Years	Team	Apps	(Gls)
1999–2002	Lokomotiv Sofia	66	(13)
2002–2006	CSKA Sofia	92	(49)
2006–2010	Strasbourg	51	(6)
2008	→ CSKA Sofia (loan)	13	(0)
2010	Universitatea Craiova	13	(1)
2011	CSKA Sofia	12	(2)
2011–2013	Ludogorets Razgrad	48	(19)
2013–2014	CSKA Sofia	38	(9)
2014	Shijiazhuang Yongchang	12	(3)
2015	Lokomotiv Sofia	12	(3)
2015–2016	Lokomotiv Plovdiv	19	(3)
2016	Beroe Stara Zagora	2	(0)
2017–2018	CSKA 1948	19	(13)
2019–2020	Vitosha Bistritsa	29	(8)
2021–2023	Vitosha Bistritsa	47	(5)
2023–2024	Rilski Sportist	8	(2)

International career
2001–2014	Bulgaria	22	(3)
- * Club domestic league appearances and goals as of 08:48, 26 November 2023 (UTC)

Emil Nikolaev Gargorov (Bulgarian: Емил Гъргоров; born 15 February 1981) is a retired Bulgarian footballer.

== Career ==
Born in Sofia, Gargorov came through the youth system at Lokomotiv Sofia. He made his first-team debut in a 2–0 away loss against Shumen at Panayot Volov Stadium on 10 April 1999.

In 2002, he signed with CSKA Sofia, for which he played 121 games and scored 57 goals. On 26 July 2006, he signed for RC Strasbourg. For the first half of 2008, from January to June, he was sent on loan back to CSKA Sofia. On 17 June 2010, Gargorov signed the Romanian team FC Universitatea Craiova. In the winter transfer window of 2011, he was released from the Romanian side and was signed by his former club CSKA Sofia. However, on 1 June 2011, Gargorov relocated to Razgrad, to sign with newly promoted Ludogorets for two years. On 11 September 2011, Gargorov netted a hat-trick in the 6–0 home win against Slavia Sofia in an A PFG match. He parted ways with the team from Razgrad in the summer of 2013.

On 13 July 2014, Gargorov transferred to China League One side Shijiazhuang Yongchang.

On 15 September 2017, Gargorov signed with Third League club CSKA 1948. In February 2019, he joined Vitosha Bistritsa. Gargorov received his first red card on 23 September 2019, in the 0:1 away loss against Etar Veliko Tarnovo.

== Career statistics ==
=== Club ===
As of matches played 25 November 2023

Appearances and goals by club, season and competition
Club	Season	League			National Cup		Continental		Other		Total	
Club	Season	Division	Apps	Goals	Apps	Goals	Apps	Goals	Apps	Goals	Apps	Goals
Lokomotiv Sofia	1998–99	A Group	6	1	0	0	–		–		6	1
Lokomotiv Sofia	1999–00	A Group	24	7	5	2	–		–		29	9
Lokomotiv Sofia	2000–01	A Group	20	5	7	2	–		–		27	7
Lokomotiv Sofia	2001–02	A Group	17	2	0	0	–		–		17	2
CSKA Sofia	2002–03	A Group	24	14	8	2	4	2	–		36	18
CSKA Sofia	2003–04	A Group	21	15	6	4	6	1	–		33	20
CSKA Sofia	2004–05	A Group	22	9	5	0	4	1	–		31	10
CSKA Sofia	2005–06	A Group	25	11	5	3	10	2	–		40	16
RC Strasbourg	2006–07	Ligue 1	2	0	0	0	–		1 (Note: Appearances in Coupe de la Ligue)	0	3	0
RC Strasbourg	2007–08	Ligue 2	2	0	0	0	–		–		2	0
CSKA Sofia (loan)	2007–08	A Group	13	0	0	0	0	0	–		13	0
RC Strasbourg	2008–09	Ligue 2	26	4	0	0	–		1 (Note: Appearances in Coupe de la Ligue)	0	27	4
RC Strasbourg	2009–10	Ligue 2	21	2	1	0	–		–		22	2
RC Strasbourg	Total		51	6	1	0	0	0	2	0	54	6
U Craiova	2010–11	Liga I	13	1	3	0	0	0	–		16	1
CSKA Sofia	2010–11	A Group	12	2	1	0	0	0	–		13	2
Ludogorets Razgrad	2011–12	A Group	26	13	3	1	–		–		29	14
Ludogorets Razgrad	2012–13	A Group	22	6	0	0	2	1	1 (Note: Appearances in Bulgarian Supercup)	1	25	8
Ludogorets Razgrad	Total		48	19	3	1	2	1	1	1	54	22
CSKA Sofia	2013–14	A Group	38	9	3	0	–		–		41	9
CSKA Sofia	Total		155	60	28	9	24	6	0	0	207	75
Shijiazhuang Yongchang	2014	China League One	12	3	0	0	–		–		12	3
Lokomotiv Sofia	2014–15	A Group	12	3	1	0	–		–		13	3
Lokomotiv Sofia	Total		79	18	13	4	0	0	0	0	92	22
Lokomotiv Plovdiv	2015–16	A Group	19	3	1	1	–		–		20	4
Beroe Stara Zagora	2016–17	First League	2	0	0	0	–		–		2	0
CSKA 1948 Sofia	2017–18	Third League	19	13	0	0	–		4 (Note: Appearances in Cup of Bulgarian Amateur Football League)	0	23	13
Vitosha Bistritsa	2018–19	First League	11	4	0	0	–		–		11	4
Vitosha Bistritsa	2019–20	First League	14	3	1	0	–		–		15	3
Vitosha Bistritsa	2020–21	Second League	4	1	0	0	–		–		4	1
Vitosha Bistritsa	2021–22	Third League	20	1	0	0	–		–		20	1
Vitosha Bistritsa	2022–23	Second League	27	4	0	0	–		–		27	4
Vitosha Bistritsa	Total		76	13	1	0	0	0	0	0	77	13
Rilski Sportist	2023–24	Third League	8	2	0	0	–		–		8	2
Career total			482	138	50	15	26	7	7	1	565	161

=== International goals ===
#	Date	Venue	Opponent	Score	Result	Competition
1	29 November 2004	Osman Ahmed Osman Stadium, Cairo	Egypt	1–1	1–1	Friendly
2	22 March 2013	Vasil Levski National Stadium, Sofia	Malta	4–0	6–0	World Cup 2014 qualifying
3	10 September 2013	Ta' Qali Stadium, Attard	Malta	2–0	2–1	World Cup 2014 qualifying

== Honours ==
=== Club ===
CSKA Sofia

- A Group (3): 2002–03, 2004–05, 2007–08
- Bulgarian Cup (2): 2005–06, 2010–11

Ludogorets Razgrad

- A Group (2): 2011–12, 2012–13
- Bulgarian Cup: 2011–12
- Bulgarian Supercup: 2012

=== Individual ===
Razgrad sportsman of the year (2): 2011, 2012
