= 2004–05 Bulgarian Cup =

Tournament details
- Country: Bulgaria

Final positions
- Champions: Levski Sofia (24th cup)
- Runners-up: CSKA Sofia

The 2004–05 Bulgarian Cup was the 65th season of the Bulgarian Cup. Levski Sofia won the competition, beating CSKA Sofia 2–1 in the final at the Vasil Levski National Stadium in Sofia.

== First round ==
In this round entered winners from the preliminary rounds together with the teams from B Group.

6 October 2004	Sliven 2000 (III)	1–2	Shumen (II)	Sliven
15:00 EEST	Beadirov 51'		M. Ivanov 18', 31'	Stadium: Hadzhi Dimitar; Attendance: 1,000

6 October 2004	Aksakovo (III)	0–5	Pirin 1922 (II)	Aksakovo
15:00 EEST			Krastev 3'; A. Bachev 42'; Rizov 52'; Yanev 55'; Yurukov 86'	Stadium: Aksakovo; Attendance: 100

6 October 2004	Botev Plovdiv (II)	2–0	Vihren Sandanski (II)	Plovdiv
15:00 EEST	Kostadinov 24'; Andonov 69'			Stadium: Hristo Botev; Attendance: 1,000

6 October 2004	Etar 1924 (II)	2–0	Dorostol Silistra (II)	Veliko Tarnovo
15:00 EEST	Genov 10', 34'			Stadium: Ivaylo; Attendance: 200

6 October 2004	Sokol Trastenik (IV)	4–7	Akademik Svishtov (II)	Trastenik
15:00 EEST	Milkov 32', 73', 84'; Gyurov 90' (pen.)		Taskov 13', 21', 53'; Mladenov 39'; Kirilov 76', 89'; Andreev 82'	Stadium: Atletik; Attendance: 150

6 October 2004	Spartak Plovdiv (III)	2–1	Pirin Gotse Delchev (III)	Plovdiv
15:00 EEST	Stefanov 50'; Lesev 60'		Metodiev 40'	Stadium: Todor Diev; Attendance: 200

6 October 2004	Orlovets Pobeda (III)	0–3	Slivnishki Geroy (III)	Pobeda
15:00 EEST			M. Ivanov 4', 60'; Isteliyanov 75'	Stadium: Pobeda; Attendance: 200

6 October 2004	Botev Letnitsa (IV)	0–6	Spartak Pleven (II)	Letnitsa
15:00 EEST			G. Georgiev 10'; Dr. Ivanov 32'; Nikolov 33'; G. Ivanov 75'; M. Petrov 77'; A. Petrov 89'	Stadium: Gradski; Attendance: 100

6 October 2004	Ludogorets Razgrad (III)	0–3	Rilski Sportist (II)	Razgrad
15:00 EEST			Krumov 30'; Chalakov 44'; Kirov 76'	Stadium: Dyanko Stefanov; Attendance: 1,000

6 October 2004	Hebar Pazardzhik (III)	2–1	Chernomorets Burgas (II)	Pazardzhik
15:00 EEST	Kunchev 67'; H. Hristov 88' (pen.)		Mitev 47'	Stadium: Georgi Benkovski; Attendance: 200

6 October 2004	Haskovo (III)	2–0	Lokomotiv Gorna Oryahovitsa (II)	Haskovo
15:00 EEST	Neshev 21'; Irobaliev 55'			Stadium: Haskovo; Attendance: 300

6 October 2004	Minyor Pernik (III)	3–1	Pomorie (II)	Pernik
15:00 EEST	Penev 11', 31'; Kostov 71'		Pavlov 6'	Stadium: Minyor; Attendance: 2,000

6 October 2004	Dunav Ruse (III)	0–1	Conegliano German (II)	Ruse
15:00 EEST			Mladenov Jr. 21'	Stadium: Gradski; Attendance: 1,500

6 October 2004	Minyor Draganitsa (IV)	1–6	Minyor Bobov Dol (II)	Draganitsa
15:00 EEST	Penchev 57'		Badalov 13'; Tonov 18' (pen.); M. Georgiev 23', 32'; D. Hristov 62'; Borislavov 87'	Stadium: Draganitsa

6 October 2004	Lokomotiv Stara Zagora (III)	3–2	Dobrudzha Dobrich (II)	Stara Zagora
15:30 EEST	Stefanov 53' (pen.); Tanev 72'		Kanchev 33'; Kichukov 88'	Stadium: Lokomotiv

6 October 2004	Yantra Gabrovo (III)	3–3 (a.e.t.) (4–5 p)	Svetkavitsa Targovishte (II)	Gabrovo
15:00 EEST	Mihov 1'; Tsitlakidis 35', 120'		M. Hristov 23', 61'; E. Kurdov 114'	Stadium: Hristo Botev; Attendance: 200

== Second round ==
This round featured winners from the First Round and all teams from A Group.

26 October 2004	Cherno More Varna	3–4 (a.e.t.)	Lokomotiv Sofia	Varna
15:00 EEST	Valev 35', 75'; Simov 78'		Atanasov 10'; Stoyanov 36'; Genkov 51'; Kondev 101'	Stadium: Ticha; Attendance: 1,000

27 October 2004	Belasitsa Petrich	1–0	Rodopa Smolyan	Petrich
15:00 EEST	Junivan 26'			Stadium: Tsar Samuil; Attendance: 200

27 October 2004	Shumen (II)	0–3	CSKA Sofia	Shumen
15:00 EEST		Report	E. Yordanov 39'; Gargorov 46'; Sakaliev 87'	Stadium: Panayot Volov; Attendance: 7,000; Referee: Kostadin Kostadinov (Sofia)

27 October 2004	Etar 1924 (II)	1–0	Slavia Sofia	Veliko Tarnovo
15:00 EEST	St. Ivanov 49'			Stadium: Ivaylo; Attendance: 4,000

27 October 2004	Botev Plovdiv (II)	5–0	Akademik Svishtov (II)	Plovdiv
15:00 EEST	Andonov 21', 54'; Domakinov 37'; Saidhodzha 71'; Blagoev 72' (pen.)			Stadium: Hristo Botev; Attendance: 1,000

27 October 2004	Pirin Blagoevgrad	1–2	Lokomotiv Plovdiv	Blagoevgrad
15:00 EEST	Irmiev 60'		Jayeoba 45+1'; Kamburov 83'	Stadium: Hristo Botev; Attendance: 2,000

27 October 2004	Nesebar	0–5	Levski Sofia	Nesebar
15:00 EEST		Report	Chilikov 19'; T. Kolev 33', 62'; Simonović 39', 85'	Stadium: Nesebar; Attendance: 2,100; Referee: Dimitar Dimitrov (Sofia)

27 October 2004	Hebar Pazardzhik (III)	2–0	Spartak Pleven (II)	Pazardzhik
15:00 EEST	Nikolov 63'; Kunchev 85'			Stadium: Georgi Benkovski; Attendance: 500

27 October 2004	Lokomotiv Stara Zagora (III)	1–5	Svetkavitsa Targovishte (II)	Stara Zagora
15:00 EEST	Tanev 61'		E. Kurdov 34', 39', 60'; M. Hristov 36'; B. Georgiev 42'	Stadium: Lokomotiv; Attendance: 600

27 October 2004	Marek Dupnitsa	2–0	Beroe Stara Zagora	Dupnitsa
15:00 EEST	Rumenov 60'; I. Iliev 66'			Stadium: Bonchuk; Attendance: 1,000

27 October 2004	Minyor Bobov Dol (II)	1–0	Spartak Varna	Bobov Dol
15:00 EEST	Pl. Petrov 10'			Stadium: Nikolay Krastev-Schultz; Attendance: 500

27 October 2004	Conegliano German (II)	0–2	Rilski Sportist (II)	Sofia
15:00 EEST			Kirov 34'; Videnov 82'	Stadium: Akademik; Attendance: 150

27 October 2004	Slivnishki Geroy (III)	0–1	Naftex Burgas	Slivnitsa
15:00 EEST			D. Hristov 90+3'	Stadium: Slivnishki Geroy; Attendance: 1,000

27 October 2004	Haskovo (III)	0–1	Litex Lovech	Haskovo
15:00 EEST			B. Hazurov 9'	Stadium: Haskovo; Attendance: 2,000

27 October 2004	Spartak Plovdiv (III)	1–0	Minyor Pernik (III)	Plovdiv
15:00 EEST	S. Todorov 78'			Stadium: Todor Diev; Attendance: 100

27 October 2004	Pirin 1922 (II)	2–1	Vidima-Rakovski	Simitli
15:00 EEST	Yurukov 8'; Mitsanski 43'		Radulov 9'	Stadium: Septemvri; Attendance: 300

== Third round ==
9 November 2004	Lokomotiv Plovdiv	2–0	Lokomotiv Sofia	Plovdiv
14:00 EEST	Mihaylov 42' (pen.); Jančevski 58'			Stadium: Lokomotiv; Attendance: 2,000

10 November 2004	Hebar Pazardzhik (III)	1–0	Svetkavitsa Targovishte (II)	Pazardzhik
14:00 EEST	Stalev 53'			Stadium: Georgi Benkovski; Attendance: 2,000

10 November 2004	Etar 1924 (II)	0–3	Levski Sofia	Veliko Tarnovo
14:00 EEST		Report	Wagner 12', 50'; T. Kolev 75'	Stadium: Ivaylo; Attendance: 10,000; Referee: Stoyan Aleksiev (Sofia)

10 November 2004	Minyor Bobov Dol (II)	0–1	Marek Dupnitsa	Bobov Dol
14:00 EEST			B. Dimitrov 19'	Stadium: Nikolay Krastev-Schultz; Attendance: 1,000

10 November 2004	Rilski Sportist (II)	2–3 (a.e.t.)	CSKA Sofia	Samokov
14:00 EEST	Videnov 12'; Chalakov 82'	Report	Sakaliev 23'; E. Yordanov 45'; K. Hazurov 104'	Stadium: Iskar; Attendance: 2,000; Referee: Hristo Ristoskov (Sandanski)

10 November 2004	Spartak Plovdiv (III)	0–1	Botev Plovdiv (II)	Plovdiv
14:00 EEST			V. Minev 65'	Stadium: Todor Diev; Attendance: 5,000

10 November 2004	Naftex Burgas	2–0	Litex Lovech	Burgas
14:00 EEST	R. Todorov 18'; Mica 61'			Stadium: Lazur; Attendance: 300

10 November 2004	Pirin 1922 (II)	3–0	Belasitsa Petrich	Simitli
14:00 EEST	Yurukov 23', 37'; A. Georgiev 90'			Stadium: Septemvri; Attendance: 2,000

== Quarter-finals ==
15 March 2005	Botev Plovdiv (II)	1–2 (a.e.t.)	Lokomotiv Plovdiv	Plovdiv
15:00 EEST	Domakinov 10'		Kamburov 45+1'; Jančevski 92'	Stadium: Hristo Botev; Attendance: 15,000

16 March 2005	Hebar Pazardzhik (III)	0–1	CSKA Sofia	Pazardzhik
15:00 EEST		Report	E. Yordanov 2'	Stadium: Georgi Benkovski; Attendance: 10,000; Referee: Dimcho Radev (Varna)

16 March 2005	Levski Sofia	3–0	Naftex Burgas	Sofia
15:00 EEST	Koprivarov 7'; Domovchiyski 45', 81'	Report		Stadium: Georgi Asparuhov; Attendance: 2,000; Referee: Tsvetan Georgiev (Sofia)

16 March 2005	Pirin 1922 (II)	0–0 (a.e.t.) (4–2 p)	Marek Dupnitsa	Blagoevgrad
15:00 EEST				Stadium: Hristo Botev; Attendance: 2,500

== Semi-finals ==
=== First legs ===
13 April 2005	Lokomotiv Plovdiv	0–2	Levski Sofia	Plovdiv
17:00 EEST		Report	Chilikov 30'; Koprivarov 43'	Stadium: Lokomotiv; Attendance: 6,000; Referee: Tsvetan Georgiev (Sofia)

13 April 2005	Pirin 1922 (II)	0–2	CSKA Sofia	Blagoevgrad
17:00 EEST		Report	Yanchev 44'; Cauet 80'	Stadium: Hristo Botev; Attendance: 5,000; Referee: Hristo Ristoskov (Sandanski)

=== Second legs ===
3 May 2005	CSKA Sofia	3–3 (5–3 agg.)	Pirin 1922 (II)	Sofia
17:30 EEST	K. Hazurov 12'; Zakov 63', 72'	Report	Nikolov 39'; Mitsanski 65'; Pavlov 89'	Stadium: Balgarska Armiya; Attendance: 700; Referee: Georgi Ignatov (Sofia)

4 May 2005	Levski Sofia	2–1 (4–1 agg.)	Lokomotiv Plovdiv	Sofia
17:30 EEST	Jayeoba 29'; Domovchiyski 89'	Report	Halimi 60'	Stadium: Georgi Asparuhov; Attendance: 500; Referee: Hristo Ristoskov (Sandanski)

== Final ==
=== Details ===
25 May 2005
18:00 EEST

Levski Sofia	2–1	CSKA Sofia
Borimirov 52'; Domovchiyski 76'	Report	Yanev 82' (pen.)

Vasil Levski National Stadium, Sofia
Attendance: 10,848
Referee: Anton Genov (Gabrovo)

Levski	CSKA

== Top scorers ==
Rank	Scorer	Club	Goals
1	(Bulgaria) Valeri Domovchiyski	Levski Sofia	4
1	(Bulgaria) Yordan Yurukov	Pirin 1922	4
1	(Bulgaria) Evgeni Kurdov	Svetkavitsa Targovishte	4
4	(Bulgaria) Evgeni Yordanov	CSKA Sofia	3
4	(Bulgaria) Todor Kolev	Levski Sofia	3
4	(Bulgaria) Georgi Andonov	Botev Plovdiv	3
4	(Bulgaria) Tasko Taskov	Akademik Svishtov	3
4	(Bulgaria) Martin Hristov	Svetkavitsa Targovishte	3
4	(Bulgaria) Zdravko Milkov	Sokol Trastenik	3
