= 2001–02 B Group =

Season of the Bulgarian B Football Group

Bulgarian B Group
- Season: 2001–02
- Champions: Rilski Sportist
- Promoted: Rilski Sportist, Dobrudzha, Botev Plovdiv
- Relegated: Svilengrad, Minyor, Devnya
- Matches: 156
- Goals: 394 (2.53 per match)
- Top goalscorer: (Bulgaria) Rumen Shankulov (14 goals)

The 2001–02 B Group was the 46th season of the Bulgarian B Football Group, the second tier of the Bulgarian football league system. A total of 13 teams contested the league.

== Team changes ==
The following teams had changed division after the 2000–01 season.

=== To B Group ===
Promoted from V Group
- Rilski Sportist
- Belite Orli Pleven
- Svilengrad
- Devnya
Relegated from A Group
- Botev Plovdiv
- Minyor Pernik

=== From B Group ===
Promoted to A Group
- Spartak Pleven
- Marek Dupnitsa
- Lokomotiv Plovdiv
  (after merger with Velbazhd)
- Belasitsa Petrich
  (after merger with Hebar)
Relegated to V Group
- Septemvri Sofia
- Metalurg Pernik
- Haskovo
- Bdin Vidin
- Dorostol Silistra
- Shumen

== Teams ==
=== Stadiums and locations ===
Locations of the 2001–02 Bulgarian B Group teams

Team	City	Stadium	Capacity
Akademik	Svishtov	Akademik	13,500
Belite Orli	Pleven	Belite Orli	15,000
Botev	Plovdiv	Hristo Botev (Plovdiv)	20,000
Botev	Vratsa	Hristo Botev (Vratsa)	32,000
Devnya	Devnya	Povelyanovo	3,000
Dobrudzha	Dobrich	Druzhba	16,000
Dunav	Ruse	Dunav	12,000
Minyor	Pernik	Minyor	20,000
Pirin	Blagoevgrad	Hristo Botev (Blagoevgrad)	15,000
Rilski Sportist	Samokov	Iskar	7,000
Svetkavitsa	Targovishte	Dimitar Burkov	8,000
Svilengrad	Svilengrad	Kolodruma	1,750
Vidima-Rakovski	Sevlievo	Rakovski	8,816

=== Personnel ===
Team	Manager	Captain
Akademik Svishtov	(Bulgaria) Stoycho Stoev	(Bulgaria)
Belite Orli	(Bulgaria)	(Bulgaria)
Botev Plovdiv	(Bulgaria) Tencho Tenev	(Bulgaria)
Botev Vratsa	(Bulgaria)	(Bulgaria)
Devnya	(Bulgaria)	(Bulgaria)
Dobrudzha	(Bulgaria) Eduard Eranosyan	(Bulgaria)
Dunav	(Bulgaria) Ignat Mladenov	(Bulgaria) Dragomir Grigorov
Minyor	(Bulgaria)	(Bulgaria)
Pirin	(Bulgaria)	(Bulgaria)
Rilski Sportist	(Bulgaria) Ivan Marinov	(Bulgaria)
Svetkavitsa	(Bulgaria) Miroslav Mironov	(Bulgaria)
Svilengrad	(Bulgaria)	(Bulgaria)
Vidima-Rakovski	(Bulgaria) Dimitar Todorov	(Bulgaria)

=== Managerial changes ===
Team	Outgoing manager	Manner of departure	Date of vacancy	Incoming manager	Date of appointment
Botev Plovdiv	(Bulgaria) Petar Kurdov	Sacked	September 2001	(Bulgaria) Krasimir Manolov	September 2001
Vidima-Rakovski	(Bulgaria) Plamen Markov	Signed by Bulgaria	December 2001	(Bulgaria) Dimitar Todorov	December 2001
Botev Plovdiv	(Bulgaria) Krasimir Manolov	Sacked	February 2002	(Bulgaria) Tencho Tenev	February 2002
Dunav Ruse	(Bulgaria) Nikola Hristov	Mutual consent	March 2002	(Bulgaria) Ignat Mladenov	March 2002

== League table ==
Pos	Team	Pld	W	D	L	GF	GA	GD	Pts	Promotion or relegation
1	Rilski Sportist (P)	24	15	6	3	44	16	+28	51	Promotion to 2002–03 A Group
2	Dobrudzha Dobrich (P)	24	14	6	4	42	21	+21	48	Promotion to 2002–03 A Group
3	Botev Plovdiv (P)	24	13	7	4	36	19	+17	46	Promotion to 2002–03 A Group
4	Svetkavitsa Targovishte	24	12	5	7	35	24	+11	41	
5	Vidima-Rakovski	24	11	7	6	39	20	+19	40	
6	Akademik Svishtov	24	10	7	7	35	28	+7	37	
7	Pirin Blagoevgrad	24	9	6	9	32	29	+3	33	
8	Botev Vratsa	24	9	6	9	35	40	−5	33	
9	Belite Orli Pleven	24	7	6	11	26	35	−9	27	
10	Dunav Ruse	24	6	8	10	21	26	−5	26	
11	Svilengrad (R)	24	6	2	16	24	46	−22	20	Relegation to 2002–03 V Group
12	Minyor Pernik (R)	24	3	7	14	10	47	−37	16	Relegation to 2002–03 V Group
13	Devnya (R)	24	2	5	17	14	42	−28	11	Relegation to 2002–03 V Group

Source: 2001–02 B Group futbolbg.dir.bg
Rules for classification: 1) points; 2) goal difference; 3) number of goals scored.
(P) Promoted; (R) Relegated

== Top scorers ==
Rank	Scorer	Club	Goals
1	(Bulgaria) Rumen Shankulov	Vidima-Rakovski	14
2	(Bulgaria) Borislav Dimitrov	Botev Plovdiv	13
3	(Bulgaria) Vasil Kirov	Rilski Sportist	12
4	(Bulgaria) Georgi Kichukov	Botev Vratsa	11
5	(Bulgaria) Desislav Rusev	Akademik Svishtov	9
5	(Bulgaria) Spas Urumov	Akademik Svishtov	9
7	(Bulgaria) Nikolay Filipov	Dobrudzha	7
7	(Bulgaria) Stanislav Rumenov	Svetkavitsa	7
9	(Bulgaria) Emil Angelov	Svilengrad	6
9	(Bulgaria) Todor Pramatarov	Pirin	6
9	(Bulgaria) Georgi Zdravkov	Dobrudzha	6
9	(Bulgaria) Milen Kunchev	Botev Plovdiv	6
9	(Bulgaria) Valentin Ignatov	Vidima-Rakovski	6
