= 2004–05 B Group =

Forty-ninth season of the Bulgarian B Football Group

Bulgarian B Group
- Season: 2004–05
- Champions: Vihren Sandanski
- Promoted: Vihren Sandanski, Botev Plovdiv, Pirin 1922 Blagoevgrad
- Relegated: Dorostol Silistra, Akademik Svishtov, Chernomorets Burgas, Lokomotiv G. Oryahovitsa
- Matches played: 240
- Goals scored: 660 (2.75 per match)
- Top goalscorer: (Bulgaria) Iliyan Mitsanski (Bulgaria) Georgi Georgiev (21 goals)

The 2004–05 B Group was the 49th season of the Bulgarian B Football Group, the second tier of the Bulgarian football league system. A total of 16 teams contested the league.

== League table ==
Locations of the 2004–05 Bulgarian B Group teams

| Pos | Team | Pld | W | D | L | GF | GA | GD | Pts | Promotion or relegation |
|---|---|---|---|---|---|---|---|---|---|---|
| 1 | Vihren Sandanski (P) | 30 | 21 | 6 | 3 | 57 | 20 | +37 | 69 | Promotion to 2005–06 A Group |
| 2 | Botev Plovdiv (P) | 30 | 21 | 5 | 4 | 64 | 21 | +43 | 68 | Promotion to 2005–06 A Group |
| 3 | Pirin 1922 Blagoevgrad (P) | 30 | 20 | 7 | 3 | 63 | 18 | +45 | 67 | Promotion to 2005–06 A Group |
| 4 | Spartak Pleven | 30 | 19 | 4 | 7 | 61 | 27 | +34 | 61 | |
| 5 | Rilski Sportist Samokov | 30 | 15 | 6 | 9 | 47 | 35 | +12 | 51 | |
| 6 | Svetkavitsa Targovishte | 30 | 14 | 6 | 10 | 48 | 45 | +3 | 48 | |
| 7 | Minyor Bobov Dol | 30 | 12 | 5 | 13 | 46 | 42 | +4 | 41 | |
| 8 | Pomorie | 30 | 11 | 7 | 12 | 38 | 39 | −1 | 40 | |
| 9 | Shumen 2001 | 30 | 12 | 4 | 14 | 43 | 45 | −2 | 40 | |
| 10 | Conegliano German | 30 | 11 | 6 | 13 | 31 | 40 | −9 | 39 | |
| 11 | Etar 1924 Veliko Tarnovo | 30 | 10 | 6 | 14 | 38 | 46 | −8 | 36 | |
| 12 | Dobrudzha Dobrich | 30 | 10 | 5 | 15 | 34 | 53 | −19 | 35 | |
| 13 | Dorostol Silistra (R) | 30 | 5 | 10 | 15 | 24 | 43 | −19 | 25 | Relegation to 2005–06 V Group |
| 14 | Akademik Svishtov (R) | 30 | 6 | 6 | 18 | 21 | 53 | −32 | 24 | Relegation to 2005–06 V Group |
| 15 | Chernomorets Burgas (R) | 30 | 5 | 4 | 21 | 29 | 64 | −35 | 19 | Relegation to 2005–06 V Group |
| 16 | Lokomotiv G. Oryahovitsa (R) | 30 | 4 | 1 | 25 | 16 | 69 | −53 | 13 | Relegation to 2005–06 V Group |

Source: 2005 Football retro-football.bg
Rules for classification: 1) points; 2) goal difference; 3) number of goals scored.
(P) Promoted; (R) Relegated

== Top scorers ==
| Rank | Scorer | Club | Goals |
|---|---|---|---|
| 1 | (Bulgaria) Iliyan Mitsanski | Pirin 1922 | 21 |
| 1 | (Bulgaria) Georgi Georgiev | Spartak Pleven | 21 |
| 3 | (Bulgaria) Atanas Nikolov | Pirin 1922 / Dorostol | 19 |
| 4 | (Bulgaria) Iliyan Banev | Pomorie | 16 |
| 5 | (Bulgaria) Emil Urumov | Botev Plovdiv | 13 |
| 5 | (Bulgaria) Kostadin Vidolov | Botev Plovdiv | 13 |
| 7 | (Bulgaria) Georgi Bachev | Vihren Sandanski | 12 |
| 8 | (Bulgaria) Lyubomir Videnov | Rilski Sportist | 11 |
| 8 | (Bulgaria) Krasimir Svilenov | Minyor Bobov Dol | 11 |
| 8 | (Bulgaria) Evgeni Kurdov | Svetkavitsa | 11 |
