= 2005–06 B Group =

Bulgarian B Group
- Season: 2005–06
- Champions: Rilski Sportist (West); Spartak Varna (East)
- Promoted: Rilski Sportist; Spartak Varna; Conegliano
- Relegated: Yantra; Balkan; Pomorie; Zagorets
- Matches: 364
- Goals: 900 (2.47 per match)

The 2005–06 B Group was the 50th season of the Bulgarian B Football Group, the second tier of the Bulgarian football league system. The season started on 13 August 2005 and finished on 7 June 2006 with the A Group promotion play-off between the runners-up from both divisions.

== East B Group ==
Pos	Team	Pld	W	D	L	GF	GA	GD	Pts	Promotion or relegation
1	Spartak Varna (P)	26	17	5	4	34	12	+22	56	Promotion to 2006–07 A Group
2	Maritsa Plovdiv	26	14	7	5	41	21	+20	49	Qualification for Promotion play-off
3	Haskovo	26	15	3	8	37	19	+18	48	
4	Spartak Plovdiv	26	12	7	7	32	26	+6	43	
5	AKB Minyor Radnevo	26	11	6	9	30	32	−2	39	
6	Dunav Ruse	26	10	6	10	27	35	−8	36	
7	Shumen	26	10	4	12	32	33	−1	34	
8	Nesebar	26	10	4	12	37	37	0	34	
9	Dobrudzha Dobrich	26	10	4	12	27	26	+1	34	
10	Kaliakra Kavarna	26	9	5	12	27	36	−9	32	
11	Svetkavitsa Targovishte	26	8	7	11	26	26	0	31	
12	Sliven	26	9	4	13	22	30	−8	31	
13	Pomorie (R)	26	6	6	14	22	38	−16	24	Relegation to 2006–07 V Group
14	Zagorets Nova Zagora (R)	26	3	8	15	21	44	−23	17	Relegation to 2006–07 V Group

Source: Soccerway
Rules for classification: 1) points; 2) goal difference; 3) number of goals scored.
(P) Promoted; (R) Relegated

== West B Group ==
Pos	Team	Pld	W	D	L	GF	GA	GD	Pts	Promotion or relegation
1	Rilski Sportist Samokov (P)	26	20	3	3	54	25	+29	63	Promotion to 2006–07 A Group
2	Conegliano German (P)	26	19	5	2	54	15	+39	62	Qualification for Promotion play-off
3	Spartak Pleven	26	19	2	5	58	18	+40	59	
4	Vidima-Rakovski Sevlievo	26	12	7	7	39	26	+13	43	
5	Belite Orli Pleven	26	11	5	10	34	32	+2	38	
6	Pirin Gotse Delchev	26	10	6	10	39	27	+12	36	
7	Hebar Pazardzhik	26	10	3	13	35	35	0	33	
8	Etar 1924	26	9	3	14	31	39	−8	30	
9	Minyor Bobov Dol	26	8	5	13	34	37	−3	29	
10	Lokomotiv Mezdra	26	7	6	13	25	46	−21	27	
11	Montana	26	6	8	12	23	47	−24	26	
12	Minyor Pernik	26	6	6	14	25	43	−18	24	
13	Yantra Gabrovo (R)	26	5	7	14	23	52	−29	22	Relegation to 2006–07 V Group
14	Balkan Botevgrad (R)	26	5	4	17	11	43	−32	19	Relegation to 2006–07 V Group

Source: Soccerway
Rules for classification: 1) points; 2) goal difference; 3) number of goals scored.
(P) Promoted; (R) Relegated

== Promotion play-off ==
7 June 2006

Conegliano German	3–2	Maritsa Plovdiv
Dyakov 16' (pen.); Dimov 40' (o.g.); Manolov 86'	Report	An. Petrov 54'; Hristov 66' (pen.)

Rakovski, Sevlievo
Attendance: 1,100
Referee: Anton Genov (Gabrovo)
