= Spas Spasov =

Bulgarian footballer

Personal information
- Full name: Spas Petrov Spasov
- Date of birth: 23 April 1990 (age 36)
- Place of birth: Sofia, Bulgaria
- Height: 1.90 m (6 ft 3 in)
- Position: Forward

Youth career
- 1996–2000: CSKA Sofia
- 2000–2009: Lokomotiv Sofia

Senior career*
Years	Team	Apps	(Gls)
2009–2011	Kostinbrod	64	(29)
2012	Żabbar St. Patrick	9	(0)
2012	Mqabba	4	(0)
2013	Marek	12	(2)
2015	Conegliano German	10	(2)
2015	Botev Ihtiman	5	(1)
2016	Rilski Sportist	13	(7)
2016	Spartak Pleven	1	(1)
2017	CSKA 1948	21	(13)
2018	Sozopol	10	(0)
- * Club domestic league appearances and goals

Spas Spasov (Bulgarian: Спас Спасов; born 24 April 1990, in Sofia) is a Bulgarian footballer who plays as a forward.

== Career ==
On 10 February 2018, Spasov signed with Sozopol. He left the club at the end of the 2017–18 season.
