= 2000–01 A Group =

53rd completed season of top-tier football league in Bulgaria

A Group
- Season: 2000–01
- Dates: 4 August 2000 – 27 May 2001
- Champions: Levski Sofia (22nd title)
- Relegated: Botev Plovdiv, Minyor
- Champions League: Levski
- UEFA Cup: CSKA; Litex Lovech
- Matches: 182
- Goals: 552 (3.03 per match)
- Top goalscorer: Georgi Ivanov (21 goals)

The 2000–01 A Group was the 53rd season of the A Football Group, the top Bulgarian professional league for association football clubs, since its establishment in 1948.

The league was contested by the top 12 teams from the 1999–2000 season as well as Cherno More Varna and Hebar Pazardzhik, who joined as the promoted clubs from the 1999–2000 B Group.

Defending champions Levski Sofia won their 22nd Bulgarian league title overall. Botev Plovdiv and Minyor Pernik were relegated at the end of the season by finishing in the last two places.

== Teams ==
Fourteen teams competed in the league – the top twelve teams from the previous season and the two teams promoted from the B Group. The promoted teams were Cherno More Varna (returning to the top flight after a six-year absence) and Hebar Pazardzhik (returning after an eight-year absence). They replaced Dobrudzha Dobrich, Belasitsa Petrich, Pirin Blagoevgrad and Shumen.

=== Stadiums and Locations ===
Location of teams in 2000–01 A Group
Sofia 2000–01 A Group football clubs

Team	Location	Stadium	Capacity
Beroe	Stara Zagora	Beroe	22,500
Botev	Plovdiv	Hristo Botev	22,000
Cherno More	Varna	Ticha	8,250
Chernomorets	Burgas	Chernomorets	22,000
CSKA	Sofia	Balgarska Armia	22,015
Hebar	Pazardzhik	Georgi Benkovski	13,128
Levski	Sofia	Georgi Asparuhov	29,200
Lovech	Lovech	Gradski	7,050
Lokomotiv	Sofia	Lokomotiv	22,000
Minyor	Pernik	Minyor	20,000
Neftochimic	Burgas	Lazur	18,037
Slavia	Sofia	Slavia	32,000
Spartak	Varna	Spartak	7,500
Velbazhd	Kyustendil	Osogovo	13,000

=== Personnel and kits ===
Team	Manager	Captain	Kit manufacturer	Shirt sponsor
Beroe	(Bulgaria) Tsvetomir Parvanov	(Bulgaria)	(Germany) Erima	AKSA
Botev Plovdiv	(Bulgaria) Georgi Lazarov			Vitosha AD
Cherno More	(Bulgaria) Bozhil Kolev	(Bulgaria) Ventsislav Marinov	(Japan) Asics	VAI Holding
Chernomorets	(Bulgaria) Nikolay Rusev	(Bulgaria) Angel Stoykov		
CSKA Sofia	(Italy) Enrico Catuzzi		(Italy) Lotto	
Hebar	(Bulgaria) Voyn Voynov			
Levski Sofia	(Federal Republic of Yugoslavia) Ljupko Petrović	(Bulgaria) Stanimir Stoilov	(Italy) Diadora	Mobiltel
Lokomotiv Sofia	(Bulgaria) Angel Kolev		(Germany) Adidas	Delta-G
Lovech	(Bulgaria) Ferario Spasov	(Bulgaria) Vitomir Vutov	(Japan) Asics	Litex Commerce
Minyor	(Bulgaria) Ventsislav Arsov		(United States) Nike	
Neftochimic	(Bulgaria) Dimitar Stoychev	(Bulgaria) Veliyan Parushev	(Germany) Puma	Petrol AD
Slavia Sofia	(Bulgaria) Kiril Kachamanov	(Bulgaria) Veselin Vachev	(Germany) Adidas	Sofiyski Imoti
Spartak Varna	(Bulgaria) Stefan Grozdanov			
Velbazhd	(Bulgaria) Dimitar Dimitrov	(Bulgaria) Slavcho Pavlov	(United States) Nike	VIS-2

=== Managerial changes ===
Team	Outgoing manager	Manner of departure	Date of vacancy	Position in table	Incoming manager	Date of appointment
Botev Plovdiv	(Bulgaria) Dinko Dermendzhiev	Mutual consent	1 June 2000	Pre-season	(Bulgaria) Marin Bakalov	26 June 2000
Lovech	(Federal Republic of Yugoslavia) Čedomir Đoinčević	Sacked	10 June 2000	Pre-season	(Romania) Mihai Stoichiță	1 July 2000
Levski Sofia	(Bulgaria) Dimitar Dimitrov	Sacked	15 June 2000	Pre-season	(Russia) Vladimir Fedotov	7 July 2000
CSKA Sofia	(Bulgaria) Aleksandar Stankov	End of caretaker tenure	23 June 2000	Pre-season	(Italy) Enrico Catuzzi	24 June 2000
Beroe	(Bulgaria) Ventsislav Kepov	Mutual consent	June 2000	Pre-season	(Bulgaria) Nikola Ivanov	June 2000
Slavia	(Bulgaria) Miroslav Mironov	Mutual consent	June 2000	Pre-season	(Federal Republic of Yugoslavia) Žarko Olarević	June 2000
Cherno More	(Bulgaria) Radoslav Zdravkov	Mutual consent	June 2000	Pre-season	(Bulgaria) Bozhil Kolev	June 2000
Velbazhd	(Bulgaria) Dimitar Sokolov	Mutual consent	26 June 2000	Pre-season	(Bulgaria) Dimitar Dimitrov	26 June 2000
Neftochimic	(Bulgaria) Dimitar Stoychev	Mutual consent	30 June 2000	Pre-season	(Italy) Salvatore Polverino	1 July 2000
Neftochimic	(Italy) Salvatore Polverino	Sacked	6 August 2000	13th	(Bulgaria) Dimitar Stoychev	6 August 2000
Beroe	(Bulgaria) Nikola Ivanov	Sacked	14 August 2000	12th	(Bulgaria) Petko Petkov	14 August 2000
Lokomotiv Sofia	(Bulgaria) Pavel Panov	Sacked	29 August 2000	8th	(Bulgaria) Radoslav Zdravkov	29 August 2000
Levski Sofia	(Russia) Vladimir Fedotov	Sacked	30 August 2000	2nd	(Bulgaria) Nasko Sirakov (caretaker)	30 August 2000
Levski Sofia	(Bulgaria) Nasko Sirakov	End of caretaker tenure	2 October 2000	1st	(Federal Republic of Yugoslavia) Ljupko Petrović	2 October 2000
Lovech	(Romania) Mihai Stoichiță	Sacked	21 October 2000	6th	(Bulgaria) Ferario Spasov	21 October 2000
Slavia Sofia	(Federal Republic of Yugoslavia) Žarko Olarević	Mutual consent	27 November 2000	10th	(Bulgaria) Kiril Kachamanov	27 November 2000
CSKA Sofia	(Italy) Enrico Catuzzi	Mutual consent	19 December 2000	2nd	(Bulgaria) Aleksandar Stankov	20 December 2000
CSKA Sofia	(Bulgaria) Aleksandar Stankov	Mutual consent	3 March 2001	2nd	(Italy) Enrico Catuzzi	4 March 2001
Beroe	(Bulgaria) Petko Petkov	Sacked	20 March 2001	?	(Bulgaria) Tsvetomir Parvanov	20 March 2001
Lokomotiv Sofia	(Bulgaria) Radoslav Zdravkov	Sacked	29 April 2001	?	(Bulgaria) Angel Kolev	29 April 2001

== League standings ==
Pos	Team	Pld	W	D	L	GF	GA	GD	Pts	Qualification or relegation
1	Levski Sofia (C)	26	22	3	1	63	13	+50	69	Qualification for Champions League first qualifying round
2	CSKA Sofia	26	19	5	2	65	16	+49	62	Qualification for UEFA Cup qualifying round
3	Velbazhd Kyustendil	26	18	3	5	48	29	+19	57	Relegation to V Group
4	Lovech	26	17	4	5	70	23	+47	55	Qualification for UEFA Cup qualifying round (Note: Lovech won the 2000–01 Bulgarian Cup and qualified for the 2001–02 UEFA Cup qualifying round of the UEFA Cup.)
5	Neftochimic Burgas	26	12	6	8	47	34	+13	42	
6	Slavia Sofia	26	10	5	11	35	35	0	35	
7	Spartak Varna	26	10	4	12	38	40	−2	34	Qualification for Intertoto Cup first round
8	Lokomotiv Sofia	26	9	6	11	37	37	0	33	
9	Hebar Pazardzhik	26	7	5	14	38	55	−17	26	Relegation to V Group
10	Cherno More	26	7	5	14	20	49	−29	26	
11	Chernomorets Burgas	26	6	4	16	22	48	−26	22	
12	Beroe (O)	26	6	4	16	21	47	−26	22	Qualification for relegation play-off
13	Botev Plovdiv (R)	26	6	2	18	28	55	−27	20	Relegation to 2001–02 B Group
14	Minyor Pernik (R)	26	3	4	19	19	71	−52	13	Relegation to 2001–02 B Group

Source: A PFG (in Bulgarian) and rsssf.com
Rules for classification: 1st points; 2nd head-to-head points; 3rd head-to-head goal difference; 4th head-to-head goals scored; 5th head-to-head away goals scored; 6th season goal difference; 7th season goals scored; 8th "sportsmanship" (R & Y cards); 9th draw
(C) Champions; (O) Play-off winners; (R) Relegated

== Results ==
Home \ Away	BSZ	BOT	CHB	CHM	CSK	HEB	LEV	LSO	LOV	MIN	NEF	SLA	SPV	VEL
Beroe		3–1	1–0	1–0	0–0	1–1	0–2	2–0	1–2	0–0	2–0	1–2	1–2	1–2
Botev Plovdiv	1–0		2–1	1–0	0–1	3–1	1–4	0–1	1–1	3–0	1–2	2–1	2–3	1–4
Chernomorets Burgas	2–0	0–0		0–1	0–1	1–1	1–1	1–0	0–2	3–0	1–1	1–3	1–0	1–2
Cherno More	1–2	3–2	3–0		1–4	2–1	0–3	2–2	3–2	1–0	0–0	1–0	0–0	1–3
CSKA Sofia	5–0	3–0	4–0	1–0		9–2	1–1	3–0	0–0	3–0	4–0	1–0	2–0	2–0
Hebar Pazardzhik	3–0	3–0	5–1	2–0	2–4		0–1	2–2	1–4	3–0	2–2	3–0	2–1	1–3
Levski Sofia	3–0	3–0	4–0	6–0	2–1	4–1		1–0	2–1	4–0	3–0	2–1	2–1	2–0
Lokomotiv Sofia	3–2	3–2	0–1	3–0	1–4	3–1	0–2		2–2	6–1	1–1	3–0	3–0	0–0
Lovech	4–0	6–0	3–0	5–0	4–1	2–0	3–4	2–0		4–1	2–0	6–1	4–0	5–0
Minyor Pernik	2–0	4–3	2–0	1–1	1–4	1–1	0–4 (Note: Match awarded after was abandoned at 0-1 in 65th minute due to home fans throwing stones following a second sending off)	0–1	1–4		1–4	0–3	1–2	0–0
Neftochimic Burgas	4–1	2–1	3–1	4–0	0–3 (Note: Match awarded (originally finished 1–3).)	5–0	0–1	1–0	3–0	3–0		2–2	2–5	5–0
Slavia Sofia	1–1	1–0	1–2	3–0	0–2	2–0	0–0	3–1	0–0	7–1	0–0		3–2	0–2
Spartak Varna	4–1	1–0	4–3	0–0	1–1	2–1	0–1	1–1	1–2	4–0	1–2	2–0		0–3
Velbazhd Kyustendil	2–0	4–1	4–1	3–0	1–1	2–0	2–1	3–1	1–0	3–2	2–1	0–1	2–1	

Source: A PFG (in Bulgarian)
Legend: Blue = home team win; Yellow = draw; Red = away team win.

== Relegation play-off ==
30 May 2001

Beroe Stara Zagora	1–0	Pirin Blagoevgrad
Zhelev 73'

Stadion Georgi Asparuhov, Sofia
Attendance: 2,000

== Champions ==
Levski Sofia

Goalkeepers
1	(Bulgaria) Dimitar Ivankov	25	(5)
12	(Bulgaria) Georgi Sheytanov	1	(0)
30	(Bulgaria) Vihren Uzunov	1	(0)

Defenders
2	(Bulgaria) Martin Stankov	18	(0)
3	(Bulgaria) Stanimir Stoilov	15	(2)
5	(Bulgaria) Georgi Markov	22	(0)
6	(Bulgaria) Zahari Sirakov	17	(2)
11	(Bulgaria) Elin Topuzakov	22	(3)
14	(Federal Republic of Yugoslavia) Miroslav Savić	8	(0)
15	(Uzbekistan) Aleksey Dionisiev	7	(0)
22	(Bulgaria) Ilian Stoyanov	20	(1)
23	(Bosnia and Herzegovina) Dalibor Dragić	16	(2)
	(Bulgaria) Predrag Pažin*	6	(0)
	(Ukraine) Oleksandr Koval*	3	(0)

Midfielders
4	(Bulgaria) Biser Ivanov	22	(0)
10	(Bulgaria) Asen Nikolov	7	(0)
16	(Bulgaria) Chavdar Atanasov	15	(2)
17	(Russia) Konstantin Golovskoy	4	(0)
19	(Bulgaria) Svetoslav Barkanichkov	4	(0)
20	(Federal Republic of Yugoslavia) Neško Milovanović	5	(0)
21	(Bulgaria) Dimitar Telkiyski	15	(5)
25	(Bulgaria) Yordan Terziev	9	(0)
26	(Bulgaria) Viktorio Pavlov	1	(0)
28	(Russia) Vladislav Radimov	3	(1)
	(Bulgaria) Aleksandar Aleksandrov*	7	(1)
	(Ukraine) Eduard Tsykhmeystruk*	12	(1)
	(Russia) Konstantin Kaynov*	2	(0)

Forwards
7	(Brazil) Rogério Gaúcho	8	(0)
8	(Bulgaria) Georgi Bachev	11	(2)
9	(Bulgaria) Georgi Ivanov	24	(21)
18	(Bulgaria) Krum Bibishkov	2	(1)
24	(Federal Republic of Yugoslavia) Miodrag Pantelić	12	(1)
29	(Bulgaria) Dimitar Makriev	1	(0)
99	(Bulgaria) Petar Mihtarski	11	(4)
	(Uzbekistan) Georgi Georgiev*	4	(3)

Manager
(Federal Republic of Yugoslavia) Ljupko Petrović

- Pažin, Koval, Aleksandrov, Tsykhmeystruk, Kaynov and Georgiev left the club during a season.

== Top scorers ==
Rank	Scorer	Club	Goals
1	(Bulgaria) Georgi Ivanov	Levski Sofia	22
2	(Bulgaria) Hristo Yovov	Lovech	17
3	(Bulgaria) Stefan Yurukov	Lovech	14
4	(Bulgaria) Vladimir Manchev	CSKA Sofia	13
4	(Bulgaria) Valentin Stanchev	Spartak Varna	13
4	(Federal Republic of Yugoslavia) Zoran Janković	Lovech	13
7	(Bulgaria) Hristo Yanev	CSKA Sofia	12
8	(Bulgaria) Martin Kushev	Slavia Sofia	11
8	(Bulgaria) Boyko Velichkov	Velbazhd Kyustendil	11
10	(Bulgaria) Ivan Tonchev	Beroe Stara Zagora	9

- Source:2000–01 Top Goalscorers

== Attendances ==
#	Club	Average
1	Levski	13,184
2	Neftochimic	9,658
3	Beroe	7,572
4	Chernomorets	6,341
5	CSKA Sofia	6,019
6	Botev	4,972
7	Cherno More	4,901
8	Hebar	4,623
9	Velbazhd	4,041
10	Spartak Varna	3,708
11	Lovech	3,351
12	Lokomotiv Sofia	2,988
13	Slavia Sofia	1,884
14	Minyor	1,811
