= Kaloyan Karadzhinov =

Bulgarian footballer

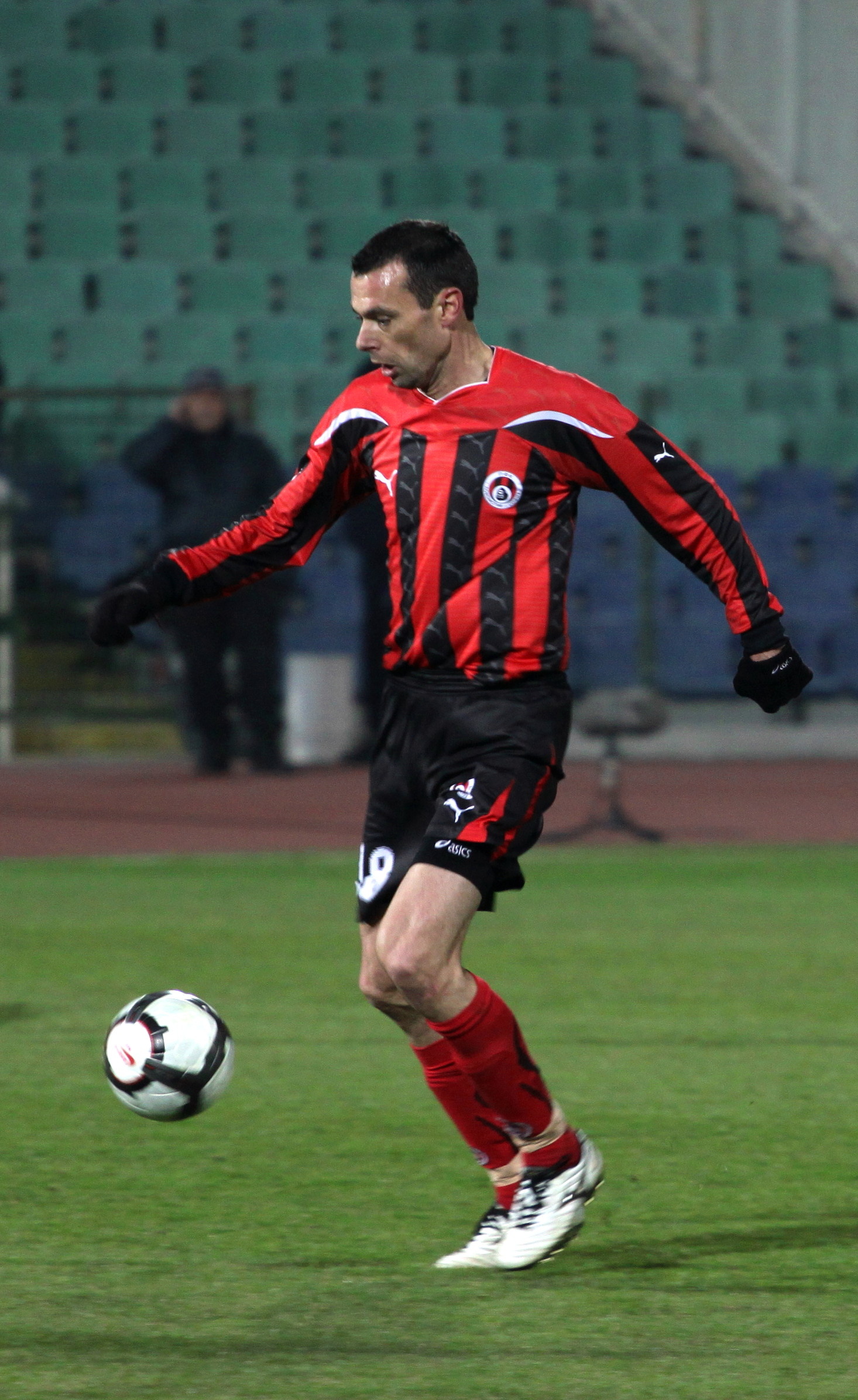

Personal information
- Date of birth: 25 January 1977 (age 49)
- Place of birth: Sofia, Bulgaria
- Height: 1.94 m (6 ft 4 in)
- Position: Defensive midfielder

Youth career
- –1996: Lokomotiv Sofia

Senior career*
Years	Team	Apps	(Gls)
1996	Nadezhda Dobroslavtsi	9	(2)
1997	Kom Berkovitsa	11	(3)
1997–2001	Himik Kostinbrod	10	(1)
2001–2004	Benkovski Kostinbrod	84	(51)
2004	Minyor Bobov Dol	14	(5)
2005–2007	Lokomotiv Sofia	75	(15)
2008–2009	Dalian Shide	7	(0)
2008	→ Botev Plovdiv (loan)	11	(0)
2009–2011	Lokomotiv Sofia	51	(2)
2015–2016	Lokomotiv 1929 Sofia	7	(2)
2016–2018	Tornado Bezden		
2018–2019	Spartak Podgumer		
2019–2020	Lokomotiv Mezdra		
2020–2021	Tornado Bezden		

International career
2005–2006	Bulgaria	2	(1)
- * Club domestic league appearances and goals as of 8 May 2016

Kaloyan Karadzhinov (Bulgarian: Калоян Караджинов; born 25 January 1977) is a Bulgarian professional footballer who plays as a midfielder.

== Club career ==
=== Early career ===
Karadzhinov started his career in the youth system of Lokomotiv Sofia. In 1996, he was released by Lokomotiv after failing to progress into their first team and joined amateur side Nadezhda Dobroslavtsi. In the following years Karadzhinov has played for a number of amateurs clubs at third and fourth division. In this period, along with his football career, he also worked as a builder, concrete maker, petrol pump attendant and travelling salesman. In 2001, he joined Benkovski Kostinbrod. For three seasons Karadzhinov earned 84 appearances in the Bulgarian V AFG, scored 51 goals.

Karadzhinov's performances at Benkovski had attracted interest from a number of professional clubs in Bulgaria and in June 2004, at the age of 27, he signed his first professional contract with Minyor Bobov Dol. On 8 August 2004, he made his B Group debut in a 1–0 home win over Chernomorets Burgas. Karadzhinov scored his first league goal for Minyor, as he netted twice in a 3–1 win over Pomorie on 22 August. Because of his good displays he caught eye of Lokomotiv Sofia scouts.

=== Lokomotiv Sofia ===
In January 2005 Karadzhinov returned to his first club Lokomotiv Sofia on a two-and-a-half-year contract for an undisclosed fee believed to be around €10,000. He marked his Lokomotiv and A Group début with winning goal in a 2–1 victory over Litex Lovech on 26 February 2005.

On 13 July 2006, Karadzhinov scored his first-ever UEFA Cup goal in a 2–0 home win over Makedonija Gjorče Petrov. He also scored twice in a 4–0 home win over Bnei Yehuda Tel Aviv on 24 August.

On 14 September 2007, Karadzhinov scored his first hat-trick in the professional football, scoring four goals in the 4–0 win over Chernomorets Burgas.

=== Dalian ===
On 31 January 2008, Karadzhinov joined Chinese side Dalian Shide. The transfer fee was undisclosed, but has been purported to be in the region of €200,000. He earned seven appearances in the Chinese Super League, before returned to Bulgaria in the summer of 2008.

On 29 August he joined Botev Plovdiv on a four months loan deal. Karadzhinov made his Botev debut in a 1–1 home draw against Litex Lovech on 13 September. On 27 September he assisted Georgi Avramov for Botev's third goal in a 5–0 home win over Belasitsa Petrich.

=== Return to Lokomotiv ===
In January 2009 Karadzhinov was released by Dalian Shide and returned to Lokomotiv Sofia. On 10 May 2009, he scored Lokomotiv's third goal in a 4–2 away victory over Belasitsa Petrich. In October 2011 he left Loko Sofia after being deemed surplus to the requirements. He retired in 2011, but returned in play in 2015, when the team was in the amateur division.

=== Tornado Bezden accident ===
In March 2021, while playing for the amateur club Tornado Bezden, Karadzhinov was involved in an incident in the league match against Kostinbrod. The match in the fourth tier of Bulgarian football was abandoned after the referee was chased from the pitch by players and officials led by Karadzhinov. Because of the accident he was banned from playing football for 2 years with the referee suing him for inflicted bodily injuries.

== International career ==
On 12 November 2005, Karadzhinov earned his first cap for his country after coming on as a second-half substitute for Blagoy Georgiev in the 6–2 win over Georgia.

== Coaching career ==
In July 2019, Karadzhinov became part of the coaching staff of third division club Nadezhda Dobroslavtsi.

== Career statistics ==
=== Club ===
As of 12 June 2011

Appearances and goals by club, season and competition
Club	Season	League		Cup		Europe		Total	
Club	Season	Apps	Goals	Apps	Goals	Apps	Goals	Apps	Goals
Minyor Bobov Dol	2004–05	14	5	3	0	–	–	17	5
Lokomotiv Sofia	2004–05	12	2	0	0	–	–	12	2
Lokomotiv Sofia	2005–06	25	5	0	0	–	–	25	5
Lokomotiv Sofia	2006–07	24	4	2	0	6	3	32	7
Lokomotiv Sofia	2007–08	14	4	2	0	4	0	20	4
Dalian Shide	2007–08	7	0	0	0	–	–	7	0
Botev Plovdiv	2008–09	11	0	1	0	–	–	12	0
Lokomotiv Sofia	2008–09	14	1	0	0	0	0	14	1
Lokomotiv Sofia	2009–10	10	1	0	0	–	–	10	1
Lokomotiv Sofia	2010–11	23	0	1	0	–	–	24	0
Lokomotiv Sofia	2011–12	4	0	0	0	2	0	6	0
Career total		158	22	9	0	12	3	179	25

=== International ===
Scores and results list Bulgaria's goal tally first.

#	Date	Venue	Opponent	Score	Result	Competition
1.	15 November 2006	Stadium Pod Dubňom, Žilina	Slovakia	1–3	1–3	Friendly match
