= Gerasim Zakov =

Bulgarian footballer

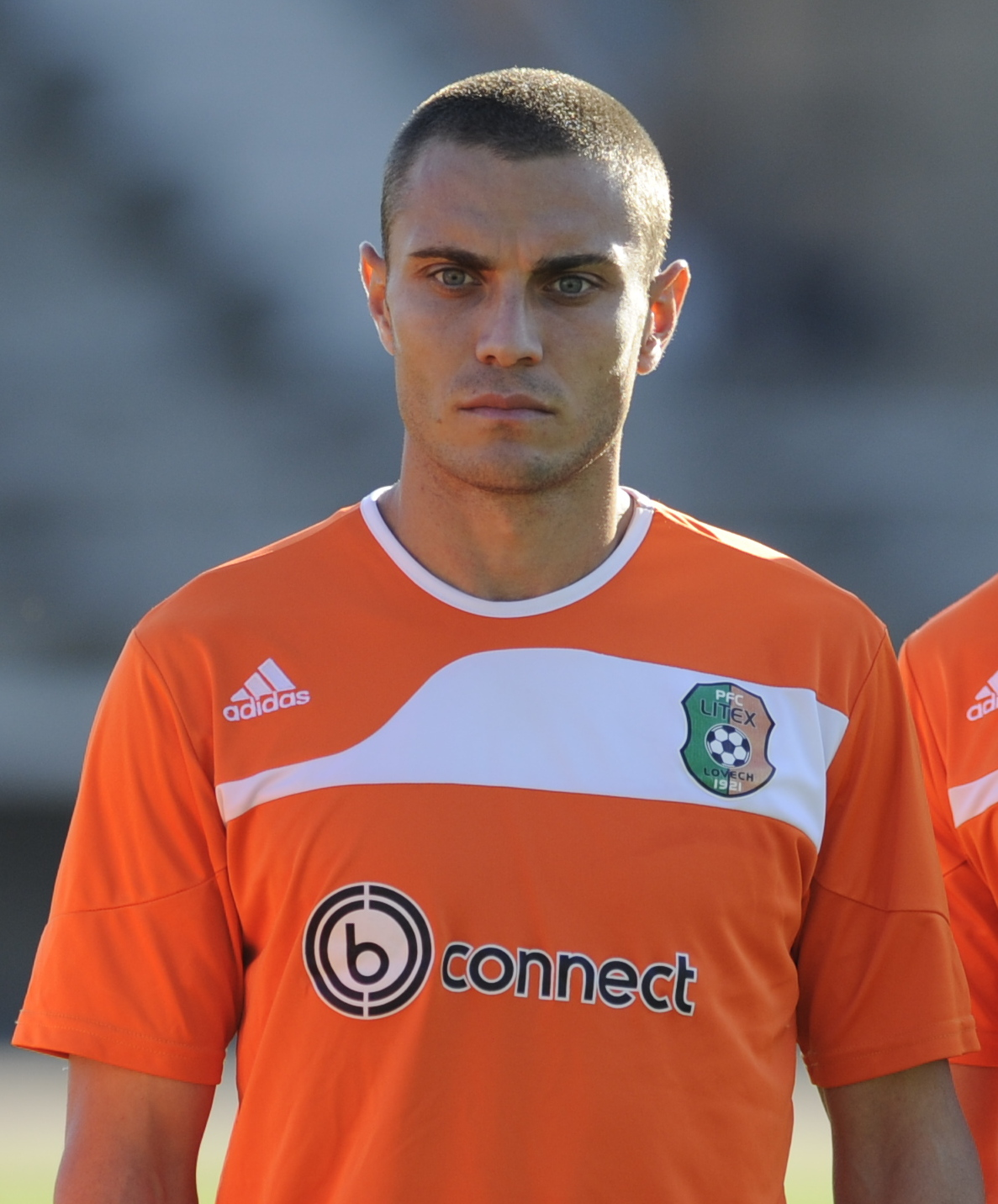

Personal information
- Full name: Gerasim Valeriev Zakov
- Date of birth: 7 September 1984 (age 42)
- Place of birth: Klyuch, Bulgaria
- Height: 1.85 m (6 ft 1 in)
- Position: Striker

Youth career
- 1997–2002: CSKA Sofia

Senior career*
Years	Team	Apps	(Gls)
2002–2005	CSKA Sofia	22	(3)
2003	→ Vidima-Rakovski (loan)	14	(2)
2005–2006	Conegliano	10	(1)
2006–2007	Beroe Stara Zagora	40	(6)
2008–2009	Lokomotiv Plovdiv	24	(3)
2009–2010	Cherno More	11	(2)
2010	Vidima-Rakovski	14	(4)
2011–2012	Kaliakra Kavarna	28	(11)
2012	Litex Lovech	15	(5)
2013	Chengdu Blades	11	(0)
2013	Neftochimic 1986	1	(0)
2014	Bansko	8	(1)
2014	PAO Varda	12	(6)
2015	Sisaket	5	(0)
2016	CSKA 1948		

International career
2003–2005	Bulgaria U21	15	(2)
- * Club domestic league appearances and goals as of 23 May 2014

Gerasim Valeriev Zakov (Bulgarian: Герасим Заков; born 7 September 1984) is a Bulgarian footballer who most recently played for CSKA 1948 as a striker. Zakov served as the team's captain. He has also played for the Bulgarian U21 squad between 2003 and 2005. He is currently employed as a sports director at Belasitsa Petrich.

== Club career ==
Zakov joined CSKA Sofia as an academy player at the age of 13, with his first coach being Angel Rangelov, and signed his professional contract with the first team in 2002. Zakov made his league debut on 30 May 2002, in the 0:1 away loss against Litex Lovech. He stayed 4 seasons at CSKA and become 2 times champion of the Bulgaria premier league and 2 times finished in 2nd place in the Bulgarian national cup. During the 2011–2012 season he scored 11 goals in the premier league for his team Kaliakra(Kavarna) and took 4th place in the top goalscorers' ranking in the league, 4 goals less than the winner Júnior Moraes from CSKA(Sofia). After this season he moved to Litex (Lovech) who was at the time coached by Bulgarian top football star Hristo Stoichkov. Zakov scored 5 goals in 15 games in the league and 3 goals in the Bulgarian national cup. At the half point of the season he moved to China and signed a contract with Chengdu Blades. From 2015 Zakov is a former player of Sisaket FC, a team from the Thai premier league.

== Honours ==
CSKA Sofia

- A PFG (2): 2002–03, 2004–05
