= OFC Kostinbrod =

Kostinbrod
- Full name: Municipality Football Club Kostinbrod 2012
- Founded: 1977; 49 years ago as Khimik Kostinbrod; 2012; 14 years ago as OFC Kostinbrod
- Ground: Benkovski Stadium, Kostinbrod
- Capacity: 2,500
- Chairman: Kostinbrod Municipality
- Head coach: Rosen Krumov
- League: South-West Third League
- 2025–26: South-West Third League, 11th
- Website: ofckostinbrod.com
Home colours	Away colours

OFC Kostinbrod 2012 (Bulgarian: ОФК Костинброд 2012) is a Bulgarian association football club based in Kostinbrod, which competes in the South-West Third League, the third tier of the Bulgarian football league system. Kostinbrod's home ground is the Benkovski Stadium, which has a capacity of 2,500 spectators.

== History ==
=== Start of football in Kostinbrod ===
The first football club within the limits of today's city was founded in 1924 in the village of Shiyakovtsi under the name "Levski". After him, the football clubs founded and existed in the time with "Udar" in the village of Maslovo, "Botev" in the village of Kostinbrod, "Benkovski" in the village of Obedinenie, "Torpedo" railway station Kostinbrod, "Dynamo" railway station Kostinbrod, "Todor Spasov" (village of Kostinbrod), "Asen Itov" (village of Kostinbrod), "Chemist" (town of Kostinbrod), "Asen Itov" (town of Kostinbrod) and "Benkovski" (town of Kostinbrod).

=== The united Khimik team in the late 1970s ===
In 1977, a few years after Kostinbrod was declared a town, a decision was made to unify all the football teams from the former villages entering the boundaries of the new town. The united club is called Khimik Kostinbrod, and it includes "Benkovski", "Dynamo", "Todor Spasov" and "DHZ Georgi Dimitrov".

Already in its first season 1977/78 Khimik Kostinbrod took 1st place A district group and qualified in the "Vitosha" zone. The team qualified for the draft until 1981, when the zonal groups were again abolished and an elite district group was created, which also included Khimik.

In 1984, the "Khimik" team participated as a finalist in the republican labor championship and won the gold medals. During his preparation for the next season, he played a prestigious match against the Russian giant CSKA Moscow, which he lost 2:5.

During the period 1984–1994, the junior team was on the rise and played in the Sofia elite group, taking the scalp of some of the leading Sofia schools.

=== After the 90s ===
After 1990, the team was in V Group, occupying draft positions until 1994, after which it was relegated to A Regional group. In the following year, he returned to B Group, where he played until 1997 before being disbanded. A break of two years followed without the existence of a team.

In 1999, an initiative committee engaged with the football community and a general assembly re-established FC Benkovski. Krasimir Gachev was elected chairman. The team takes 2 places, which sends it to play-offs to enter V Group and then wins over Belasitsa Petrich with 4:2 and over Golem Buchino with 5:1 and returns to V Group.

In the 2005/06 season, "Benkovski" reached the final of the Amateur Cup tournament. The match was played at the Vasil Levski National Stadium, but the team from Kostinbrod lost to PSFC Chernomorets Burgas with 1:4. The following year, in the 1/8 finals of the Bulgarian Cup, they lost to Cherno More (as a guest by 1:3, and as a home team by 2:4). In this period, the famous Rosen Krumov and Kaloyan Karadzhinov played in the team. In parallel with the men's team, the junior team also had success, playing in the final for the national championship with Slavia. The match ended with a score of 3:1 in favor of Slavia. In the 2008/09 season, Velbazhd Kyustendil united with "Benkovski" (Kostinbrod) from OFG Sofia before the start of the season. The team remains under the name Velbazhd and plays its home matches in Kostinbrod. In 2009/10, Velbazhd was renamed to "Benkovski" and the headquarters were moved to Kostinbrod. In the following years, the team occupied leading positions in the ranking of "B" RFG, before being disbanded again a year in 2011.

=== Creation of OFC "Kostinbrod" 2012 ===
A year after it was disbanded, the football club was rebuilt again, this time under a new name and only with a children's and youth school.

A week before the resumption of the 2011/12 spring half-season, OFK Kostinbrod (Kostinbrod) joins Botev Ihtiman from OFG Sofia. Since re-registration and changing the name of the club is not allowed during the season, its name is not changed, and in the spring the team plays its home games in Ihtiman. From the next season, the team bears the name Botev 1921 (Ikhtiman).

In 2015, the men's team was also restored, which already in the first year won the undisputed first place in the Regional A, enough for a barrage to enter the "Third League" (the former "B" group). In the first zonal final in Sofia region, Balkan Botevgrad won after a penalty shootout 5:4 (2:2 in regular time). However, in the grand final, the Kostinbrod players met the glorious team of Lokomotiv Sofia, who rushed forward and lost 0:2.

On 29 May 2021, the team won over OFC Kostenets and took the Sofia Regional league and promoted to Third League. On 14 July 2021 Lyubomir Bozhankov was announced as the new manager of the team. He was released an year later, being successed by Hristo Koilov.

== Players ==
=== Current squad ===
As of 30 October 2026

Note: Flags indicate national team as defined under FIFA eligibility rules; some limited exceptions apply. Players may hold more than one non-FIFA nationality.

No.	Pos.	Nation	Player
1	GK	BUL	Valentin Galev
3	DF	BUL	Asen Georgiev
4	DF	BUL	Angel Yarev
5	DF	BUL	Viliyan Spasov
6	MF	BUL	Kristiyan Atanasov
7	MF	BUL	Kris Valchinov
8	MF	BUL	Stefan Metodiev
9	DF	BUL	Martin Zimbilev
10	MF	BUL	Asparuh Smilkov
11	MF	BUL	Kiril Yanakiev
12	GK	BUL	Kaloyan Petkov
13	MF	BUL	Tsvetomir Todorov

No.	Pos.	Nation	Player
14	FW	BUL	Georgi Bozhilov
16	FW	BUL	Kaloyan Bonev
17	MF	BUL	Aleksandar Dobchev
19	FW	BUL	Lachezar Georgiev
23	GK	BUL	Aleks Vladimirov
27	MF	BUL	Dimitar Dimitrov
28	DF	BUL	Vasil Vasilev
45	DF	BUL	Hristiyan Borislavov
70	MF	BUL	Stoyan El Hadj Goze
77	MF	BUL	Bozhidar Yotov
88	MF	BUL	Daniel Gogov
99	FW	BUL	Denis Dzhordzhevich

== Notable players ==
Had international caps for their respective countries, held any club record, or had more than 100 league appearances. Players whose name is listed in bold represented their countries.

Bulgaria

- (Bulgaria) **Georgi Bozhilov**
- (Bulgaria) Valentin Galev
- (Bulgaria) **Tsvetan Genkov**
- (Bulgaria) **Kaloyan Karadzhinov**
- (Bulgaria) Spas Spasov

== Personnel ==
=== Managerial history ===
Dates	Name	Honours
2018–2020	(Bulgaria) Ventsislav Arsov	
2020–2021	(Bulgaria) Georgi Slavchev	
2021–2022	(Bulgaria) Lyubomir Bozhankov	
2023–	(Bulgaria) Hristo Koilov	
