= Hristo Koilov =

Bulgarian footballer

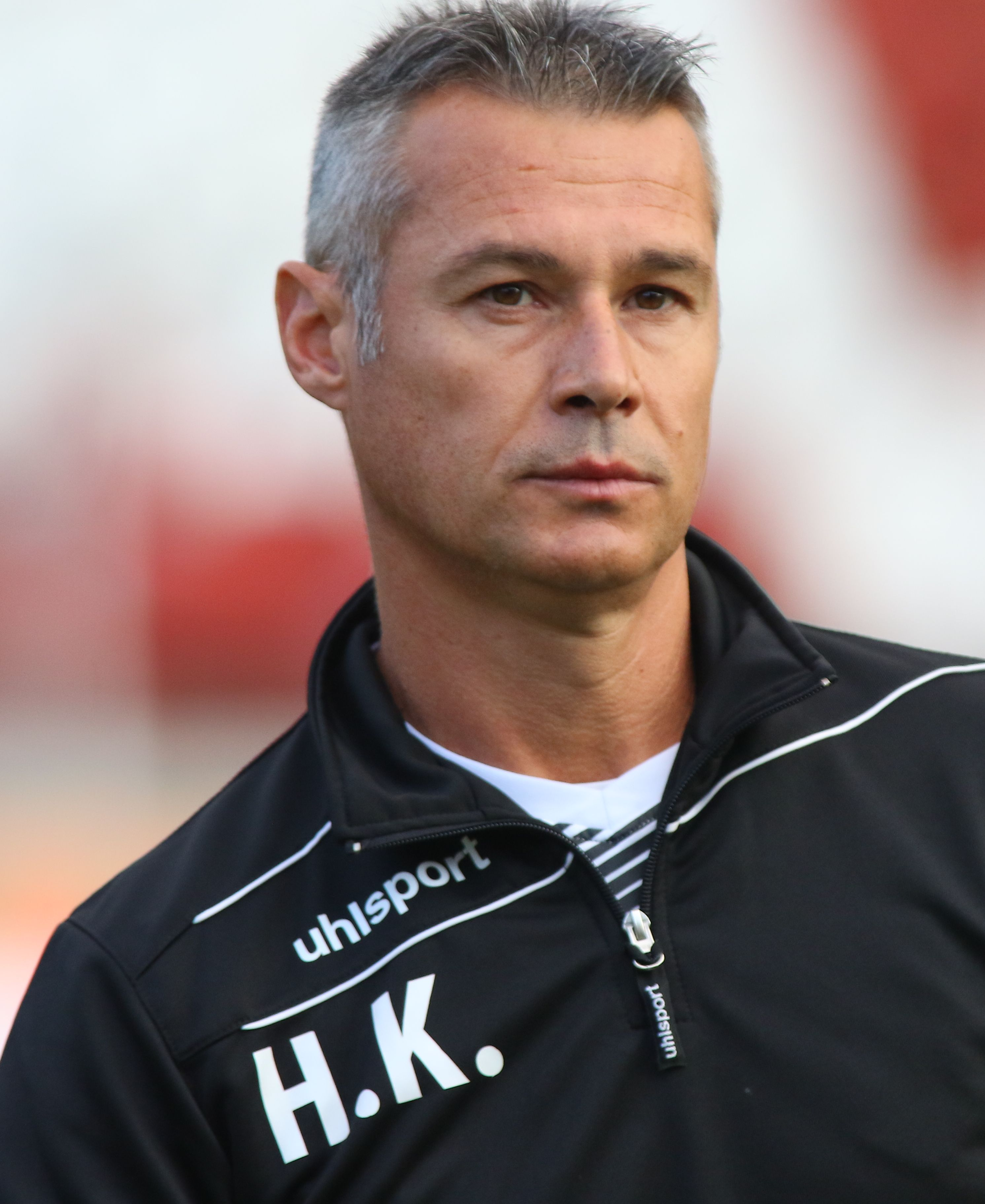

Personal information
- Full name: Hristo Dimitrov Koilov
- Date of birth: 23 September 1969 (age 57)
- Place of birth: Plovdiv, Bulgaria
- Height: 1.77 m (5 ft 10 in)
- Position: Midfielder

Youth career
- 1979–1988: Botev Plovdiv

Senior career*
Years	Team	Apps	(Gls)
1989–1992	Botev Plovdiv	65	(3)
1992–1995	CSKA Sofia	68	(11)
1995–1997	Lokomotiv Sofia	56	(7)
1997–1999	FC Luzern	56	(3)
1999–2003	Union Berlin	110	(10)
2003–2009	Lokomotiv Sofia	125	(9)
Total		480	(43)

International career
1993	Bulgaria	1	(0)

Managerial career
- 2011–2012: Lokomotiv Sofia (Assistant)
- 2016: Beroe Stara Zagora (Assistant)
- 2017: Lokomotiv Sofia (Assistant)
- 2017: Septemvri Sofia (Assistant)
- 2017–2018: Septemvri Sofia U17
- 2018–2021: Lokomotiv Mezdra
- 2022–2024: Kostinbrod
- 2025: Oborishte Panagyurishte
- 2026–: Oborishte Panagyurishte
- * Club domestic league appearances and goals

Hristo Dimitrov Koilov (Bulgarian: Христо Димитров Коилов; born 23 September 1969) is a Bulgarian former professional footballer who played as a midfielder.

== Career ==
On the club level, Koilov played for Botev Plovdiv, CSKA Sofia, Lokomotiv Sofia, FC Luzern and 1. FC Union Berlin. For Berlin club Union he played from 1999 to 2003, when he was in the successful team that surprisingly reached the German cup final in May 2001 and afterwards the second round of the UEFA Cup.

He played his last match in his career on 13 June 2009 with Lokomotiv Sofia against Slavia Sofia.

In 1993 Koilov earned his first and only cap with Bulgaria national team.
