= Stefan Kostadinov =

Bulgarian footballer

Personal information
- Full name: Stefan Kostadinov Kostadinov
- Date of birth: 21 June 1984 (age 42)
- Place of birth: Vidin, Bulgaria
- Height: 1.80 m (5 ft 11 in)
- Position: Attacking midfielder

Senior career*
Years	Team	Apps	(Gls)
2003–2006	Botev Plovdiv	73	(5)
2005	→ Rodopa Smolyan (loan)	6	(0)
2006–2007	Rilski Sportist	7	(2)
2007–2008	Pirin Blagoevgrad	26	(2)
2008–2009	Neftochimic 1986	7	(0)
2010–	Botev Plovdiv	3	(1)
- * Club domestic league appearances and goals as of 12 September 2010

Stefan Kostadinov (Bulgarian: Стефан Костадинов) (born 21 June 1984) is a Bulgarian footballer, who plays for Botev Plovdiv as a midfielder.
