= Paul Adado =

Togolese footballer (born 1983)

Personal information
- Full name: Paul Adado
- Date of birth: 21 October 1983 (age 43)
- Place of birth: Lomé, Togo
- Height: 1.83 m (6 ft 0 in)
- Position: Defender

Senior career*
Years	Team	Apps	(Gls)
1999–2000	Dynamic Togolais	22	(2)
2000–2001	Al-Nasr (Benghazi)	27	(5)
2001–2002	Apollon Smyrnis		
2002–2004	Litex Lovech	27	(4)
2005	Vidima-Rakovski	13	(1)
2005–2006	Doxa Drama	18	(2)
2006–2008	PAS Giannina	48	(0)
2008–2009	Panserraikos	1	(0)

International career
2000–2008	Togo	4	(0)
- * Club domestic league appearances and goals

Paul Adado (born 21 October 1983 in Lomé) is a former Togolese footballer who played as a central defender or defensive midfielder for the Togo national team.

== Career ==
In his professional career, Adado played for Dynamic Togolais Lomé, Al-Nasr (Benghazi), Apollon Smyrnis, Litex Lovech, Vidima-Rakovski Sevlievo, Doxa Drama, PAS Giannina and Panserraikos.

== Honours ==
Litex Lovech

- Bulgarian Cup: 2003–04
