= Miroslav Rizov =

Bulgarian footballer

Personal information
- Full name: Miroslav Aleksandrov Rizov
- Date of birth: 10 October 1976 (age 50)
- Place of birth: Blagoevgrad, Bulgaria
- Height: 1.76 m (5 ft 9 1/2 in)
- Position: Defender

Team information
- Current team: Bdin Vidin
- Number: 2

Senior career*
Years	Team	Apps	(Gls)
2003–2011	Pirin Blagoevgrad	133	(1)
2006–2007	→ Pirin GD (loan)	17	(1)
2011	Septemvri Simitli	5	(0)
2012–	Bdin Vidin	0	(0)
- * Club domestic league appearances and goals as of 13 February 2012

Miroslav Rizov (born on 10 October 1976) is a Bulgarian footballer currently playing for Bdin Vidin. Rizov is a left defender.
