= Dimitar Todorov (footballer, born 1957) =

Bulgarian footballer

Personal information
- Date of birth: 15 September 1957 (age 69)
- Place of birth: Sevlievo, PR Bulgaria
- Position: Defender

Team information
- Current team: Pavlikeni (manager)

Senior career*
Years	Team	Apps	(Gls)
1976–1979	Vidima-Rakovski		
1979–1991	Spartak Pleven		

Managerial career
- 1998–2002: Vidima-Rakovski (Assistant)
- 2002–2005: Vidima-Rakovski
- 2009–2011: Vidima-Rakovski
- 2013–2015: Vidima-Rakovski
- 2017–: Pavlikeni
- * Club domestic league appearances and goals

Dimitar Todorov (Bulgarian: Димитър Тодоров) (born 15 September 1957) is a Bulgarian former football player and the current football manager of Pavlikeni.

== Coaching career ==
Todorov managed his hometown club Vidima-Rakovski Sevlievo on several occasions. On 20 July 2017, he was appointed as manager of Third League club Pavlikeni, taking the role effectively as of 24 July.

== Honours ==
=== As a coach ===
Vidima-Rakovski

- B PFG
  - Winner (1): 2009-10
