= Krasimir Manolov =

Bulgarian footballer (born 1956)

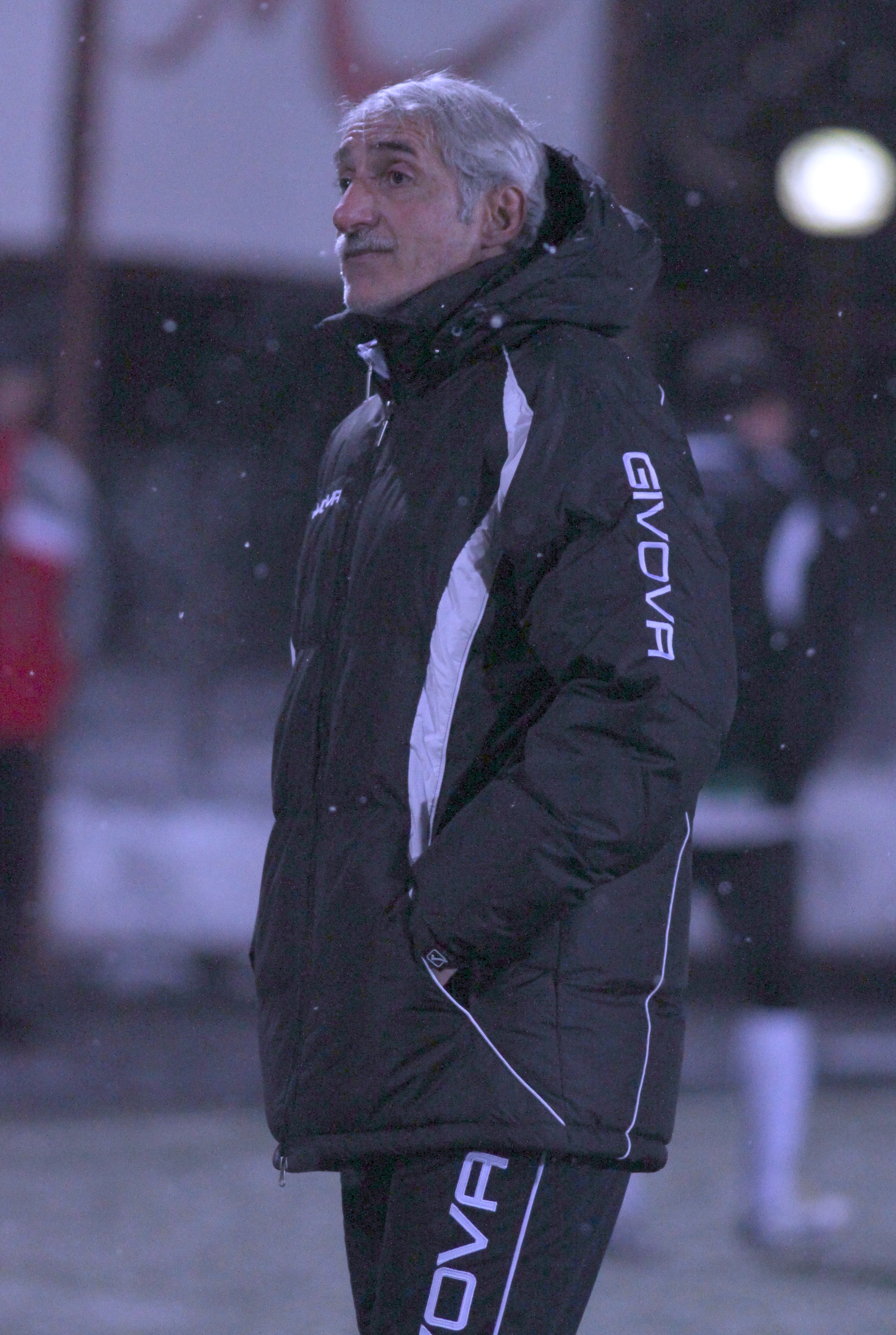
- Manolov in 2012

Personal information
- Full name: Krasimir Atanasov Manolov
- Date of birth: 31 October 1956 (age 69)
- Place of birth: Plovdiv, Bulgaria
- Position: Striker

Senior career*
Years	Team	Apps	(Gls)
1974–1976	Lokomotiv Plovdiv	25	(6)
1976–1978	Akademik Sofia	42	(16)
1978–1983	Trakia Plovdiv	112	(32)
1983–1985	FC Shumen	92	(43)
1986–1987	Spartak Plovdiv	48	(23)
1987–1988	Alki Larnaca		
1988–1990	Valletta	28	(7)
1990–1992	Balzan Youths		
1992–1993	Marsa	19	(11)

International career
1978–1979	Bulgaria	7	(1)

Managerial career
- 1992–1993: Marsa (player-manager)
- 1997–1998: Xghajra Tornadoes
- 1998–2001: Valletta
- 2001–2002: Botev Plovdiv
- * Club domestic league appearances and goals

Krasimir Atanasov Manolov (Bulgarian: Красимир Манолов; born 31 October 1956) is a Bulgarian football manager and former footballer.

== Career ==
Manolov represented Bulgaria internationally at youth level. He helped the Bulgaria national under-18 football team win the 1974 UEFA European Under-18 Championship. In 1978 and 1979 he was capped 7 times for Bulgaria, scoring once.

In 1983, Manolov signed for Bulgarian side Volov.

== Personal life ==
Manolov has been married. He has a daughter.

== Honours ==
=== Manager ===
Valletta

- Maltese Premier League: 1998–99, 2000–01
- Maltese FA Trophy: 1998–99, 2000–01
- Maltese Super Cup: 1999, 2001
- Super 5 Lottery Tournament: 1999-00, 2000–01
- Centenary Cup: 2000–01
- Löwenbräu Cup: 2000–01
