= Milcho Tanev =

Bulgarian footballer

Personal information
- Date of birth: 21 January 1983 (age 43)
- Place of birth: Stara Zagora, Bulgaria
- Height: 1.80 m (5 ft 11 in)
- Position: Midfielder

Team information
- Current team: Vereya Stara Zagora
- Number: 8

Senior career*
Years	Team	Apps	(Gls)
2004–2005	Minyor Radnevo		
2005–2006	Lokomotiv StZ		
2006–2009	Beroe Stara Zagora	42	(3)
2009–	Vereya Stara Zagora		
- * Club domestic league appearances and goals as of 30 April 2008

Milcho Tanev (born 21 January 1983, in Stara Zagora) is a Bulgarian footballer currently playing for Vereya Stara Zagora as a midfielder.

- Height - 1.80 m.
- Weight - 82 kg.
