= Aleksandar Stankov (football manager) =

Bulgarian football and manager

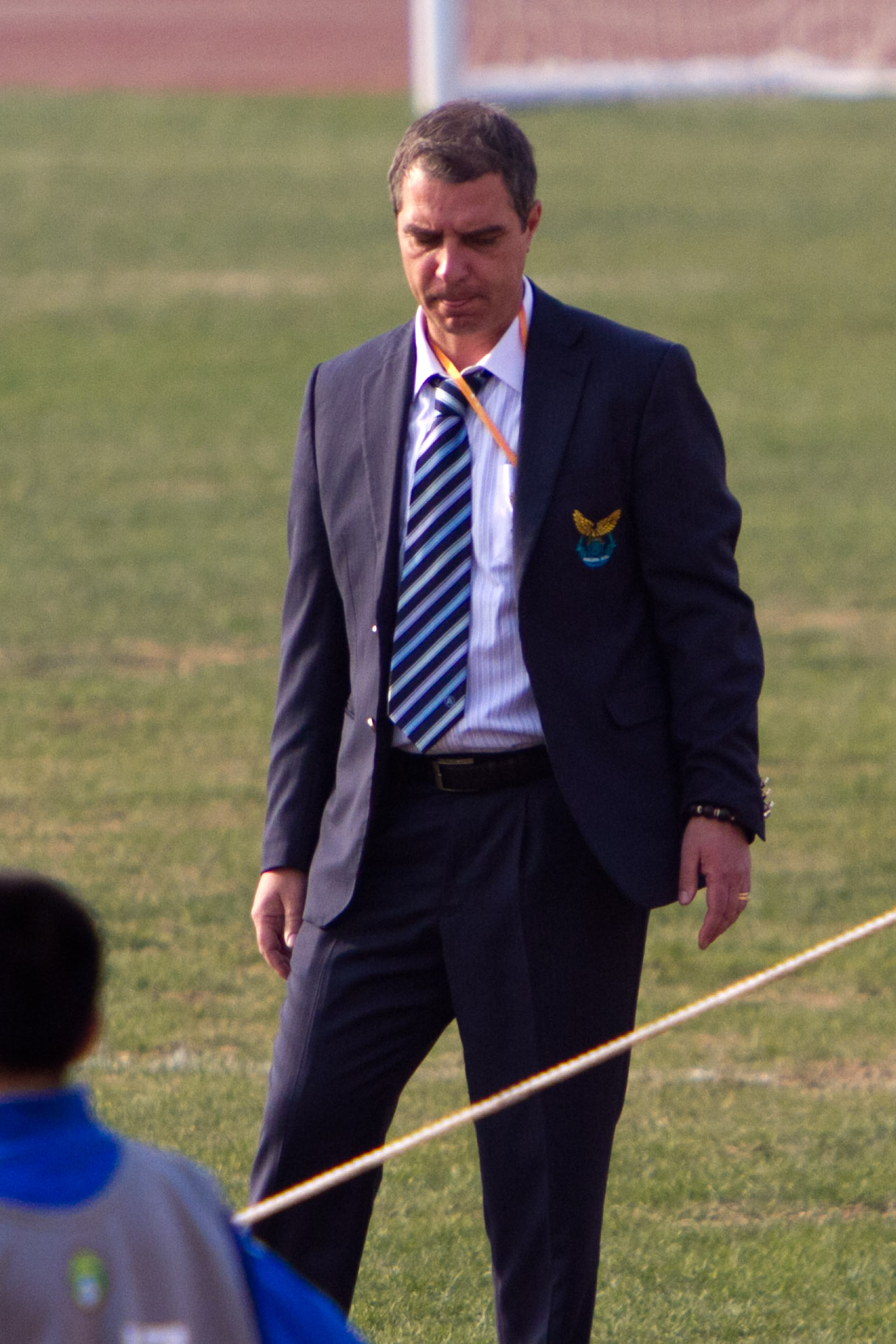

Personal information
- Full name: Aleksandar Borisov Stankov
- Date of birth: 3 September 1964 (age 62)
- Place of birth: Sofia, Bulgaria
- Height: 1.84 m (6 ft 1/2 in)
- Position: Midfielder

Senior career*
Years	Team	Apps	(Gls)
- FC Teteven
- Minyor Buhovo
- FC Bankya

Managerial career
- 1998–1999: Haskovo (assistant)
- 1999–2000: Alki Larnaca (assistant)
- 2000: CSKA Sofia (assistant)
- 2000: CSKA Sofia
- 2000: CSKA Sofia (assistant)
- 2001: CSKA Sofia
- 2001: CSKA Sofia (assistant)
- 2001–2002: Cherno More
- 2003–2004: CSKA Sofia
- 2005: Krylia Sovetov-2
- 2006–2008: Bulgaria U21
- 2008–2009: CSKA Sofia (assistant)
- 2010–2011: Dalian Aerbin
- 2013–2014: Lokomotiv Plovdiv
- 2014: Cherno More
- 2015: Hunan Billows
- 2017: Meizhou Hakka
- * Club domestic league appearances and goals

Aleksandar Borisov Stankov (born 3 September 1964) is a Bulgarian football manager and a former footballer, who is currently manager.

== Managerial career ==
In 2005, he worked with the second team of Krylia Sovetov in Russia. On 12 June 2010, Stankov agreed to join Chinese side Dalian Aerbin as manager, signing a one-and-a-half-year contract. He guided Dalian to the Chinese Super League, but was released by the club in January 2011 when his contract expired.

On 15 June 2013, Stankov was officially appointed as the Lokomotiv Plovdiv manager.

On 16 May 2017, Meizhou Hakka F.C. signed Stankov as their manager.
