= Emil Urumov =

Bulgarian footballer

Personal information
- Date of birth: 20 January 1984 (age 42)
- Place of birth: Plovdiv, Bulgaria
- Height: 1.86 m (6 ft 1 in)
- Position: Striker

Youth career
- 1994–2002: PFC Botev Plovdiv

Senior career*
Years	Team	Apps	(Gls)
2002–2008	Botev Plovdiv	42	(14)
2006	→ Spartak Plovdiv (loan)	14	(6)
2008	Rodopa Smolyan	10	(3)
2008–	Maritsa Plovdiv		
- * Club domestic league appearances and goals

Emil Urumov (Bulgarian: Емил Урумов) (born 20 January 1984), is a Bulgarian footballer who plays as a striker. He developed his career in Botev Plovdiv's youth teams, and played for the club in the A PFG.

== Career statistics ==
Club	Season	Division	League		Cup		Total	
Club	Season	Division	Apps	Goals	Apps	Goals	Apps	Goals
Botev Plovdiv	2002–03	A PFG	0	0	1	0	1	0
Botev Plovdiv	2003–04	A PFG	7	0	0	0	7	0
Botev Plovdiv	2004–05	B PFG	22	13	3	0	25	13
Botev Plovdiv	2005–06	A PFG	3	0	1	0	4	0
Spartak Plovdiv	2005–06	B PFG East	14	6	0	0	14	6
Botev Plovdiv	2006–07	A PFG	20	8	2	2	20	8
Botev Plovdiv	2007–08	A PFG	3	0	1	0	4	0
Rodopa Smolyan	2007–08	B PFG East	10	3	0	0	10	3
Maritsa Plovdiv	2008–09	B PFG East	5	0	0	0	5	0
