= Stadion Iskar =

Stadium in Samokov, Bulgaria

Iskar Stadium
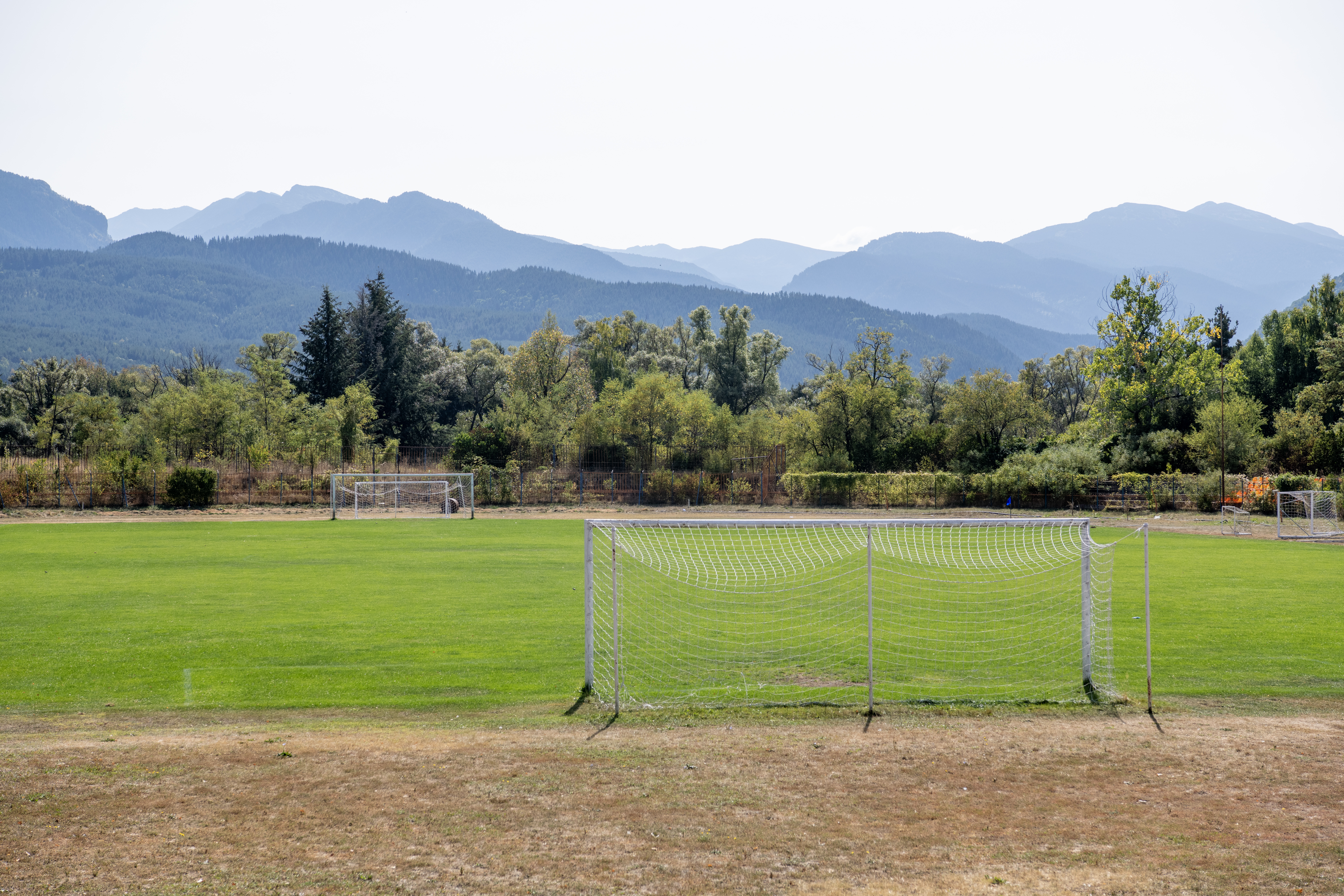
- Iskar Stadium in 2020
- Interactive map of Iskar Stadium
- Location: Samokov, Bulgaria
- Coordinates: 42°19′19.96″N 23°33′32.21″E
- Owner: Ministry of Physical Education and Sport of Bulgaria
- Operator: PFC Rilski Sportist
- Capacity: 7000
- Surface: Grass
- Field size: 105m X 68m

Construction
- Opened: 1952
- Renovated: 2005

Tenant
- Rilski Sportist 1972 - present

Iskar Stadium is a multi-use all-seater stadium in Samokov, Bulgaria, named after the Iskar River.

It is currently used for football matches and is the home ground of PFC Rilski Sportist and has a 6,800 capacity. It is located in the southwestern part of Samokov near the biggest park of the city, Gradski, just off the 82 main road to the ski resort Borovets. The best attendance was on 22 October 2002 – a match between PFC Rilski Sportist (ПФК Рилски спортист Самоков) and PFC Levski Sofia (ПФК Левски София), with 6,800 spectators.

== History ==
Construction for the stadium began in 1950 and it opened 20 July, 1952, with a football match. It was named after Петър Есов (Petar Esov) until the 1990s when it was renamed Iskar.

The stadium was used for athletics competitions.

== Concert venue ==
The stadium has hosted concerts.
