= Miroslav Mironov =

Bulgarian footballer and coach

Personal information
- Full name: Miroslav Atanasov Mironov
- Date of birth: 28 November 1963
- Place of birth: Ruse, Bulgaria
- Date of death: 7 March 2014 (aged 50)
- Place of death: Sofia, Bulgaria
- Position: Forward

Senior career*
Years	Team	Apps	(Gls)
1979–1986	Dunav Ruse	157	(20)
1986–1990	Slavia Sofia	96	(14)

Managerial career
- 1999–2000: Slavia Sofia
- 2001–2002: Svetkavitsa
- 2002–2003: Spartak Varna
- 2003–2004: Belasitsa Petrich
- 2005–2006: Spartak Pleven
- 2006–2007: Spartak Varna
- 2007–2008: Balkan Botevgrad
- 2008–2011: Dunav Ruse
- 2013: Svetkavitsa
- * Club domestic league appearances and goals

Miroslav Atanasov Mironov (Bulgarian: Мирослав Атанасов Миронов; 28 November 1963 – 7 March 2014) was a Bulgarian footballer and coach.
