= Vasil Kirov =

Bulgarian footballer

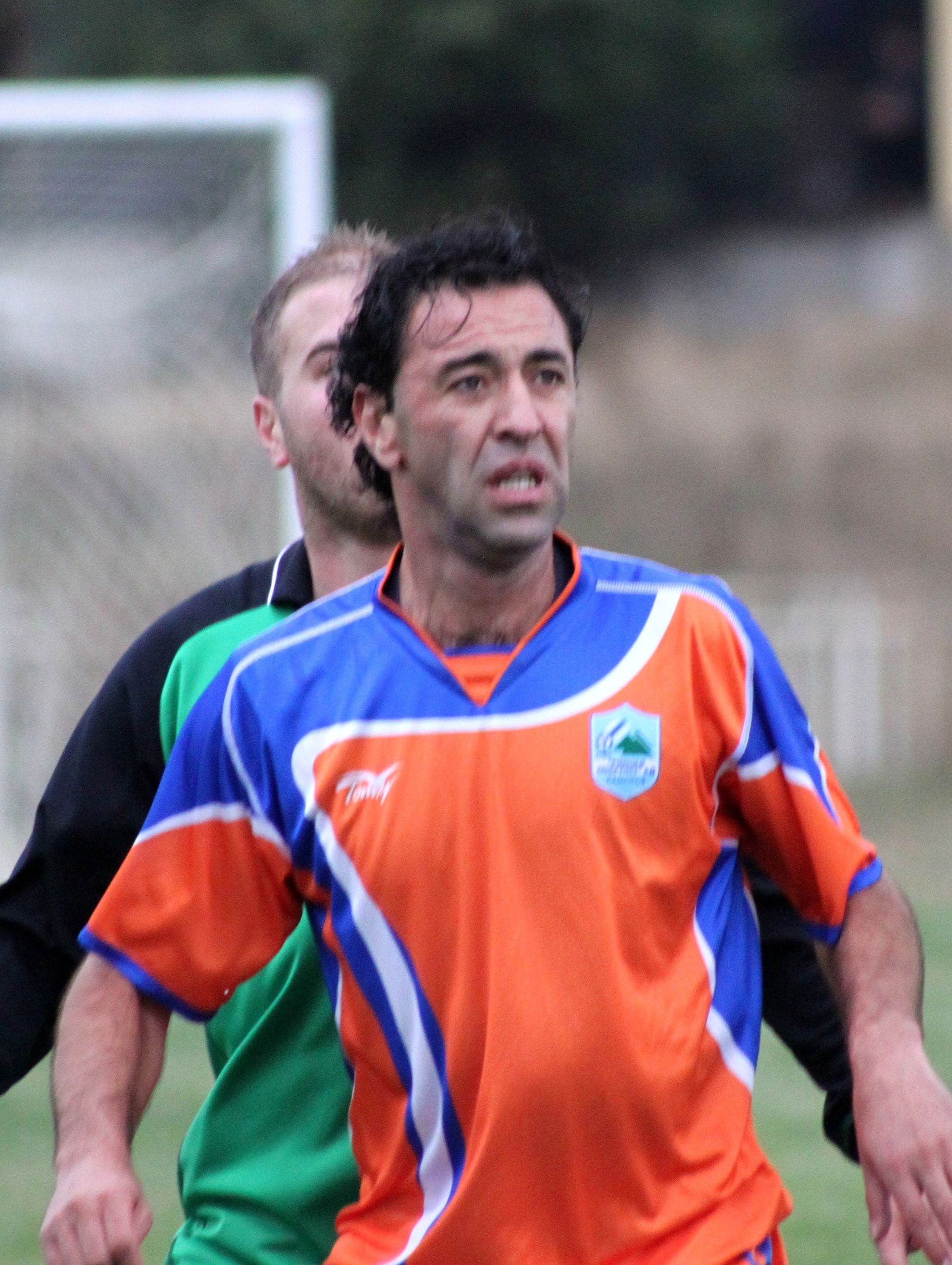

Personal information
- Date of birth: 7 December 1975 (age 50)
- Place of birth: Samokov, Bulgaria
- Height: 1.83 m (6 ft 0 in)
- Position: Midfielder

Senior career*
| Years | Team | Apps | (Gls) |
| 1994–1996 | Metalurg Pernik | | |
| 1996–1998 | Minyor Pernik | 42 | (6) |
| 1998–1999 | Litex Lovech | 16 | (1) |
| 1999–2000 | Beroe Stara Zagora | 24 | (1) |
| 2000–2001 | Slavia Sofia | 7 | (0) |
| 2001–2003 | Rilski Sportist | 43 | (11) |
| 2003–2004 | Marek Dupnitsa | 25 | (2) |
| 2004–2005 | FC Atyrau | | |
| 2005–2006 | Doxa Drama | | |
| 2006–2007 | Rilski Sportist | 29 | (4) |
| 2007–2008 | Lokomotiv Mezdra | 3 | (0) |
| 2009 | Botev Krivodol | 6 | (0) |
| 2010–2017 | Rilski Sportist | | |
- * Club domestic league appearances and goals

Vasil Kirov (Bulgarian: Васил Киров; born 7 December 1975) is a Bulgarian former professional footballer who played as a midfielder.

Kirov previously played for PFC Marek Dupnitsa in the A PFG.

== Honours ==
=== Club ===
Litex Lovech

- Bulgarian A Group: 1998–99
