= FC Minyor Bobov Dol =

Bulgarian football club

- Founded: 1952; 74 years ago
- Ground: Nikolay Krastev-Schultz

FC Minyor Bobov dol (ФК Миньор Бобов дол) is a Bulgarian football club from the town of Bobov Dol, currently playing in the Bulgarian South-West V AFG, the third division of Bulgarian football.

They played in the second division from 2004 until 2007, when they finished last in the West Group and were relegated.

== History ==
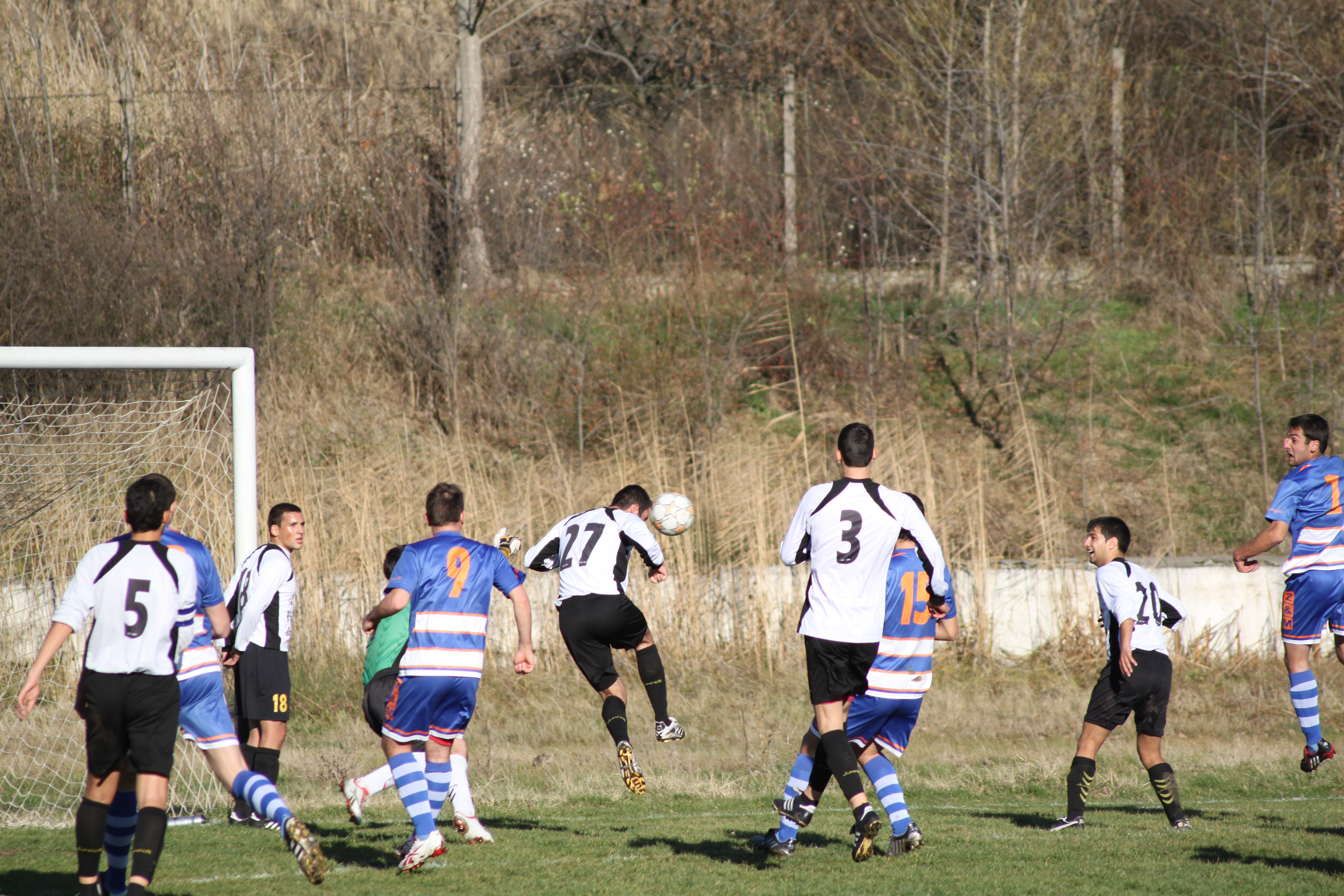
Minyor playing against Slivnitsa Hero in 2010.

Organized football in Bobov Dol dates back to the 1930s. After 1944, numerous reforms were implemented affecting the sports movement in the country. In 1946, a physical education society called Bobovdolski minyor existed in the village. The same year, it was fully sponsored by the Bobov Dol mine and adopted the name Minyor. At the end of 1949, after another change, voluntary sports organizations were created, which developed on a departmental basis within the relevant industry trade unions. In 1952, a new DSO – Minyor was formed. It separated from Torpedo and, due to the specifics of the region, became the most popular in Bobov Dol. In 1957, the DFS Minyor was established. In 1985, the football club of the same name was formed on its basis.

In 2016 the municipality stopped funding FC Minyor after some accounting problems. In 2019 the municipality refounded the club.

== Stadium ==
The Nikolay Krastev-Shults Stadium, located in Bobov Dol, serves as the home venue for FC Minyor Bobov Dol. In May 2021, the stadium underwent renovations to its dressing rooms, including repairs to the roof, installation of new window frames and flooring, improved insulation, and interior updates. The project was officially opened by local officials.

== Honours ==
- Seventh place in the 2004–05 B Group
- 1/8 finalist in the 2004–05 Bulgarian Cup
