= PFC Vidima-Rakovski Sevlievo =

Bulgarian football club

Vidima-Rakovski
- Full name: Професионален футболен клуб Видима-Раковски (Professional football club Vidima-Rakovski)
- Short name: Vidima-Rakovski
- Founded: December 29, 1922; 103 years ago as SC Rakovski
- Dissolved: January 29, 2015; 11 years ago Vidima-Rakovski
- Ground: Rakovski Stadium, Sevlievo
- 2013–14: North-West V AFG, 8th
Home colours	Away colours

PFC Vidima-Rakovski Sevlievo (Bulgarian: ПФК Видима-Раковски Севлиево) was a Bulgarian football club based in Sevlievo, which competed in various Bulgarian football leagues (ultimately the North-West V AFG, the third level of Bulgarian football) before dissolving in 2015.

The club was established on September 2, 1997, as Vidima-Rakovski. It was the successor to SC Rakovski, which was founded on December 19, 1922. Vidima-Rakovski played in the lower divisions of the Bulgarian football league system until 2003, when the club was promoted to the top division. The club's home ground was the Rakovski Stadium in Sevlievo, which has a capacity of 8,816 people. The club folded in 2015 after financial problems and was succeeded by Sevlievo.

== Honours ==
Bulgarian A PFG:

- 12th place: 2003–04

Bulgarian B Group

- Champion (1): 2009–10

Bulgarian Cup:

- Quarter-finalist in the National Cup Tournament: at that time its official name is Cup of Bulgaria - 2003/04
- Cup of Bulgarian Amateur Football League: 1998/99

== History ==
Vidima-Rakovski was founded on December 29, 1922, as the Rakovski football club by a group of football enthusiasts of the Association for Tourism in Rositsa. Upon its formation, Ivan Tsochev, Boris Popivanov, and Serafim Ganushev became the president, secretary, and steward respectively. Brothers Sokurov, who played on the team, chose to name it Rakovski in honor of the Bulgarian national hero Georgi Sava Rakovski. They played their first game against Viktoria F.C. from Veliko Tarnovo, ending in a 1:1 draw.

After the reorganization of some of the sports associations in Bulgaria, some voluntary sports organizations arose in Sevlievo. The most popular was DSO Red Flag (Bulgarian: ДСО Червено знаме). In 1957, every voluntary sports organizations union in VSO Rakovski. Two years later Rakovski was admitted into the Bulgarian Third Division. In 1968 the club was promoted for the first time to B PFG, the second division of Bulgarian football.

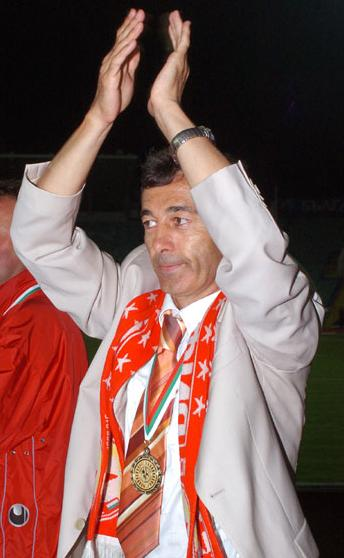
Plamen Markov led Vidima to first promotion in 2002–03.

In 1980, the club was renamed F.C. Rositsa. The team became known as PFC Vidima-Rakovski in 1997, after the union between F.C. Rakovski and F.C. Vidima, a little club of the Vidima Standart Ideal works. In the next 1998–99 season, the team won the Cup of Amateur Bulgarian league.

In the 2002–03 season, with Plamen Markov as head coach, Vidima achieved its first ever promotion to the A Group. Gerasim Zakov scored the club's first top league goal in a 3–3 draw against Lokomotiv Sofia. The 2003-04 campaign, remembered as the first A PFG season in the club's history ended in a good 12th place. In the same season, Vidima-Rakovski had their best Bulgarian Cup run, beating Kameno and Belasitsa Petrich before losing to Lokomotiv Sofia in the quarter-finals.

In the next season, Vidima did not perform as well, winning just nine games and were relegated after two seasons in the top tier.

In 2006–07 season Vidima-Rakovski finished 2nd in B PFG, and managed to participate in the play-off for promotion to the A PFG. On June 2, 2007, Vidima won the play-off against PFC Naftex Burgas with a result of 1-0 and qualified for the first division for the second time in the club's history. However, the next year they were relegated again.

In 2009-10 Vidima won a third promotion to the top division by winning the Western B PFG. They finished at 14th place in A PFG in the next season and secured their top division status via relegation play-off against Sportist Svoge, which they won in a penalty shoot-out.

In the 2011–12 season, they finished 14th in the league, winning only 3 of their 30 matches. As a result, Vidima competed in B PFG in the 2012–2013 season.

In 2015, the club was dissolved, but later in the same year, it was reformed under the name FC Sevlievo. The reformed club carries the records and history of the previous entity founded in 1922, therefore it is not considered a new club.

== Stadium ==
The club's home ground was the Rakovski Stadium in Sevlievo. The stadium has an exact seating capacity of 8,816 spectators and it was opened in 1958. It was renovated in 2001, when plastic seats and a new scoreboard were installed.

== Notable players ==
- (Bulgaria) Marian Dragnes
- (Bulgaria) Ivaylo Stoimenov
- (Bulgaria) Borislav Stoychev
- (Bulgaria) Ivan Todorov
- (Bulgaria) Plamen Iliev
- (Togo) Paul Adado

== Managers ==
- (Bulgaria) Dimitar Todorov (2009–2011)
- (Bulgaria) Kostadin Angelov (2011–2012)
- (Bulgaria) Dimitar Todorov (2012–2013)
- (Bulgaria) Atanas Marinov (2013)
- (Bulgaria) Anton Velkov (2013–2014)
