= FC Rilski Sportist Samokov =

Bulgarian football club

Rilski Sportist
- Full name: Football Club Rilski Sportist Samokov
- Nickname: The Skiers
- Founded: 1947; 79 years ago
- Ground: Iskar
- Capacity: 7,000
- Chairman: Dimitar Dzhorgov
- Head coach: Plamen Krumov
- League: Second League
- 2025–26: Third League South-West, 1st of 18 (promoted)
- Website: pfcrilskisportist.com
Home colours	Away colours

FC Rilski Sportist Samokov (Bulgarian: ФК Рилски спортист Самоков) is a Bulgarian football club from the town of Samokov founded in 1947 and currently playing in the Second League, the second tier of Bulgarian football from next season after promotion from Third League South-West in 2025–26. Their home stadium is Iskar Stadium.

Throughout the majority of its history, Rilski Sportist has competed in the lower levels of Bulgarian football, usually the second, or third tiers. In 2002, however, the team managed to promote to the A Group for the first time. Their inexperience led to an immediate relegation. Three years later, Rilski Sportist returned to the A Group, only to be relegated again. Since then, the club has been competing mostly in the amateur levels of Bulgarian football.

The club's nickname is the ‘Skiers’, which originates from the fact that the town of Samokov and nearby Borovets are major resorts for winter sports in Bulgaria.

== History ==
PFC Rilski Sportist was founded in 1947 after the union of a few smaller teams from Samokov. Throughout much of its history, the team competed in the second or third tiers of Bulgarian football.

In 2002, Sportist achieved its first ever promotion to the Bulgarian elite, then known as A Group, for the 2002–03 season. As expected from a newcomer, Rilski Sportist found it difficult to survive. The team managed to win only one game and finished last, thus being relegated, after just one year among the best.

Three seasons later, the team won the 2005–06 B Group, which enabled them to play in the A PFG for a second time. In their second top-flight season, they won 10 games and earned 30 points. They were the only team to win against Levski in the league in that season. However, they were still 3 points behind 13th placed Spartak Varna, meaning that they were relegated again. The two top flight seasons remain their most important achievement overall. Since then, the team has shifted between the second and third tiers of Bulgarian football.

In the second division "The Skiers" have 23 participations – 664 matches in total, with 269 wins, 139 draws and 253 losses. Their best result in the Bulgarian Cup has been reaching the quarter-finals in 1950/51 and 2001/02.

"Rilski Sportist" means "Rila sportsman" in Bulgarian.

=== Crest history ===
1947–1960

1978–1990

1990–present

== Honours ==
A Group (now First League):

- Fourteenth place (2): 2002–03, 2006–07

B Group (now Second League):

- Winners (2): 2001–02, 2005–06

Third League South-West:

- Winner (1): 2025–26

A Regional – Sofia:

- Winners (2): 2010–11, 2013–14

Bulgarian Cup:

- Quarter-final (2): 1951, 2001–02

== Players ==
=== Current squad ===
As of 23 June 2026

Note: Flags indicate national team as defined under FIFA eligibility rules; some limited exceptions apply. Players may hold more than one non-FIFA nationality.

No.	Pos.	Nation	Player
1	GK	BUL	Ivaylo Nedelchev
3	DF	NED	José de Almeida Reis
4	DF	BUL	Pavel Todorov
6	DF	BUL	Emil Panov
7	MF	BUL	Kaloyan Dokovski
8	MF	BUL	Mitko Mitkov
9	FW	BUL	Iliya Dimitrov
10	FW	BUL	Georgi Bozhilov
11	MF	BUL	Marto Boychev (on loan from CSKA 1948)
12	GK	BUL	Dragomir Petkov
13	DF	BUL	Galin Minkov
14	MF	BUL	Emil Martinov
16	MF	BUL	Valeri Bozhinov

No.	Pos.	Nation	Player
17	MF	BUL	Emre Dryanov
18	DF	BUL	Iliya Milanov
20	MF	BUL	Martin Atanasov (on loan from Lokomotiv Plovdiv)
22	DF	BUL	Stoyan Gyurov
33	DF	BUL	Pavlin Chilikov
44	DF	BUL	Viktor Genev
71	DF	BUL	Kristian Stoilkov
77	FW	BUL	Kaloyan Yosifov
88	MF	BUL	Teodor Totev
93	MF	BUL	Iliya Rusinov
94	MF	BUL	Yulian Nenov
98	MF	BUL	Georgi Tartov

For recent transfers, see Transfers summer 2026.

== Notable players ==
Had international caps for their respective countries, held any club record, or had more than 100 league appearances. Players whose name is listed in bold represented their countries.

Bulgaria

- (Bulgaria) **Georgi Bozhilov**
- (Bulgaria) **Emil Gargorov**
- (Bulgaria) **Ivan Karadzhov**
- (Bulgaria) Vasil Kirov
- (Bulgaria) **Iliya Milanov**
- (Bulgaria) **Yordan Minev**
- (Bulgaria) **Dobromir Mitov**
- (Bulgaria) **Milen Radukanov**
- (Bulgaria) **Mihail Valchev**
- (Bulgaria) **Radoslav Vasilev**
- (Bulgaria) **Ivaylo Yordanov**

== Detailed season history ==
Results of league and cup competitions by season
Season	League											Bulgarian Cup	Other competitions		Top goalscorer	
Season	Division	Level	P	W	D	L	F	A	GD	Pts	Pos	Bulgarian Cup	Other competitions		Top goalscorer	
2010–11	A Regional Sofia	4	18	17	1	0	86	6	+80	52	1st ↑	DNQ	Cup of AFL	R1		
2011–12	V Group	3	36	21	5	10	66	29	+37	68	3rd	DNQ	Cup of AFL			
2012–13	V Group	3	30	6	4	20	28	71	–43	22	15th ↓	DNQ	Cup of AFL			
2013–14	A Regional Sofia	4	20	20	0	0	94	12	+82	60	1st ↑	DNQ				
2014–15	V Group	3	30	7	6	17	26	46	–20	27	14th	DNQ				
2015–16	V Group	3	32	10	5	17	41	43	–2	35	11th	DNQ	Cup of AFL	GS		
2016–17	Third League	3	34	12	7	15	53	61	–8	43	9th	DNQ	Cup of AFL	QF		
2017–18	Third League	3	34	10	6	18	40	51	–11	36	15th	DNQ	Cup of AFL	R1		
2018–19	Third League	3	34	13	10	11	47	42	+5	49	8th	DNQ	Cup of AFL	R1		
2019–20	Third League	3	18	2	5	11	13	33	–20	11	16th	DNQ	Cup of AFL	QF		
2020–21	Third League	3	34	9	7	18	30	45	–15	34	13th	DNQ	Cup of AFL	R1		
2021–22	Third League	3	38	14	6	18	56	64	–8	48	10th	DNQ	Cup of AFL	DNQ	(Bulgaria) Petko Petkov	22
2022–23	Third League	3	22	11	3	8	37	31	+6	36	15th	DNQ	Cup of AFL	QF	(Bulgaria) Radoslav Vasilev	12
2023–24	Third League	3	38	16	4	18	58	61	–3	52	7th	DNQ	Cup of AFL	R1	(Bulgaria) Krasimir Panchev	11
2024–25	Third League	3	36	18	8	10	68	51	+17	62	4th	Preliminary round	Cup of AFL	QF	(Bulgaria) Grigor Dolapchiev	22
2025–26	Third League	3										TBA				

=== Key ===
- GS = Group stage
- QF = Quarter-finals
- SF = Semi-finals

Champions	Runners-up	Promoted	Relegated

== Stadium ==
Iskar stadium is situated in the southwestern part of Samokov near the biggest park of the city – "Gradski". Built in 1972, the stadium has around 7 000 seating places, most of which are covered. The field measures 105x68 meters. The best attendance was on 31 August 2002 in the match with PFC Levski Sofia – 6 800 spectators.
