= Conegliano German F.C. =

Bulgarian football club

Conegliano
- Full name: Football Club Conegliano German
- Founded: 2001; 25 years ago
- Dissolved: 2015; (merged into Septemvri Sofia)
- Ground: German, Sofia
- Capacity: 2,000
Home colours	Away colours

FC Conegliano was a Bulgarian football club based in German. They last played in the South-West Amateur Football Group, the third tier of Bulgarian football, before merging with DIT Academy, into PFC Septemvri Sofia. The club was founded in 2001.

== History ==
Conegliano was founded in 2001. Since their establishment and promotion, Conegliano German have been an important team in the B PFG and achieved promotion to the A PFG in 2005-2006 by winning over Maritsa Plovdiv in the playoffs. The club made this rapid ascent to the top level just five years after its creation.

Shortly after winning promotion, in June 2006, the name of team was changed to Chernomorets Burgas Sofia. This controversial name was chosen because the club was registered in Burgas, but played its home games in Sofia. In its maiden season in the A Group, the club ended the 2006-07 season at the bottom of the table with no wins, a single draw and 29 losses in 30 games, and a goal difference of 8 scored and 131 conceded. The club didn't even end the season on positive points, with their single point from their only draw of the season not managing to cancel out a 3 point penalty imposed for not registering enough youth players, which meant the club ended the season with a points tally of -2. This places the club at the very bottom of the all-time ranking of the A Group since 1948.

The club withdrew from B PFG in the summer of 2007 due to big financial debts. The club changed its name to Chernomorets Burgas Bulgaria in the summer of 2007 and shortly after ceased to exist.

The club was re-founded in 2013 under the name Conegliano German, and managed to win the Regional A OFG, which enabled it to promote to the V Group. After the end of the 2014-15 season, the team was acquired by DIT Academy and merged into PFC Septemvri Sofia.
