= 2015–16 PFC Cherno More Varna season =

Cherno More
2015–16 season
- Chairman: Marin Mitev
- Manager: Nikola Spasov
- A Group: 6th
- Bulgarian Cup: Quarterfinals (knocked out by Beroe)
- Bulgarian Supercup: Winners
- UEFA Europa League: 2nd qualifying round (knocked out by Dinamo Minsk)
- Top goalscorer: League: Mathias Coureur (11); All: Mathias Coureur (12)
- Highest home attendance: 4,320 (vs Levski, 8 August 2015)
- Lowest home attendance: 470 (vs Botev Plovdiv, 14 May 2016)
- Average home league attendance: 1,618
- Biggest win: 7–1 (vs Pirin Razlog, 23 September 2015)
- Biggest defeat: 1–5 (vs Levski, 28 April 2016)
Home colours	Away colours	Third colours
- All statistics correct as of 22 May 2016.

This page covers all relevant details regarding PFC Cherno More Varna for all official competitions inside the 2015–16 season. These are the Bulgarian Supercup, A Group, Bulgarian Cup and UEFA Europa League.

== Transfers ==
=== In ===
Date	Pos.	Name	From	Fee
15 June 2015	MF	(France) Mehdi Bourabia	Lokomotiv Plovdiv	Free
23 June 2015	DF	(Portugal) Ginho	(Portugal) Aves	Free
25 June 2015	FW	(Argentina) Juan Varea	(Bosnia and Herzegovina) Željezničar Sarajevo	Free
30 June 2015	MF	(Bulgaria) Andreas Vasev	Dunav	Free
8 July 2015	DF	(Bulgaria) Trayan Trayanov	Lokomotiv Sofia	Free
24 September 2015	DF	(Portugal) Pedro Eugénio	Haskovo	Free
16 December 2015	MF	(Bulgaria) Georgi Iliev	(China) Shijiazhuang Ever Bright	Free
8 January 2016	MF	(Bulgaria) Vladislav Romanov	(Greece) Trikala	Free
12 January 2016	DF	(Bulgaria) Plamen Nikolov	Botev Plovdiv	Free
3 February 2016	MF	(Bulgaria) Ivan Valchanov	Slavia	Free
3 February 2016	MF	(Serbia) Ivan Marković	(Greece) Levadiakos	Free
25 February 2016	DF	(Bulgaria) Borislav Stoychev	(Greece) Atromitos	Free

=== Out ===
Date	Pos.	Name	To	Fee
6 May 2015	MF	(Bulgaria) Petar Zlatinov	Free agent	Released
25 May 2015	FW	(Bulgaria) Georgi Bozhilov	Beroe	Free
25 May 2015	MF	(Bulgaria) Ivan Kokonov	Beroe	Free
26 May 2015	DF	(Bulgaria) Kiril Kotev	Lokomotiv Plovdiv	Free
30 May 2015	DF	(Bulgaria) Slavi Stalev	Dobrudzha	Free
30 May 2015	DF	(Bulgaria) Toni Stoichkov	Botev Ihtiman	Free
3 July 2015	DF	(Bulgaria) Zhivko Atanasov	Slavia	Free
12 December 2015	DF	(Portugal) Ginho	Free agent	Released
12 December 2015	MF	(Poland) Marcin Burkhardt	(Norway) Ullensaker/Kisa IL	Free
12 December 2015	FW	(Argentina) Juan Varea	(Albania) Bylis Ballsh	Free
12 December 2015	FW	(Bulgaria) Villyan Bijev	(United States) Portland Timbers 2	Free
31 December 2015	GK	(Bulgaria) Iliya Nikolov	Maritsa Plovdiv	Free
11 January 2016	MF	(France) Mehdi Bourabia	Levski Sofia	€100,000

=== Loans out ===
Date	Pos.	Name	To	End date	Fee
15 January 2016	MF	(Bulgaria) Nikolay Minkov	Dobrudzha	End of season	Free
1 February 2016	MF	(Bulgaria) Emil Iliev	Kaliakra	End of season	Free
1 February 2016	DF	(Bulgaria) Georgi Gushlev	Kaliakra	End of season	Free
1 February 2016	GK	(Bulgaria) Zlati Zlatev	Dobrudzha	End of season	Free
1 February 2016	MF	(Bulgaria) Daniel Dimitrov	Inter Plachidol	End of season	Free
5 February 2016	DF	(Bulgaria) Stefan Ivanov	Dobrudzha	End of season	Free

== Squad information ==
N	Pos.	Nat.	Name	Age	EU	Since	App	Goals	Ends	Transfer fee	Previous Club	Notes
1	GK	(Bulgaria)	~~Iliya Nikolov~~	29	EU	2014	6	0	2015	Free	Rakovski	(Note: Player left the club in December 2015.)
3	CM	(Bulgaria)	Daniel Georgiev	33	EU	2013	174	16	2016	Free	Lokomotiv Plovdiv	(Note: Georgiev made 101 appearances and scored 12 goals during his first spell at the club between 2007 and 2011.)
4	LB	(Bulgaria)	Mihail Venkov (captain)	32	EU	2013	96	0	2016	Free	CSKA	
5	RB	(Bulgaria)	Stefan Stanchev	27	EU	2013	53	0	2016	Free	Minyor Pernik	
6	CB	(Mali)	Mamoutou Coulibaly	32	Non-EU	2015	59	1	2016	Free	(Kazakhstan) Kaisar	(Note: Coulibaly made 29 appearances during his first spell at the club between 2009 and 2010.)
7	AM	(Bulgaria)	Bekir Rasim	21	EU	2012	44	0	2016	Youth system	Cherno More Academy	
8	DM	(Cape Verde)	Sténio	28	EU	2014	56	7	2016	Free	(Portugal) Feirense	
9	FW	(Spain)	Bacari	28	EU	2013	58	15	2016	Free	(Spain) L'Hospitalet	
10	CM	(Netherlands)	Marc Klok	23	EU	2014	37	0	2016	Free	(Scotland) Ross County	
11	FW	(Bulgaria)	Zhivko Petkov	23	EU	2014	39	3	2016	Free	Neftochimic	
13	LW	(Bulgaria)	Simeon Raykov	26	EU	2014	83	18	2016	Free	Chernomorets Burgas	(Note: Raykov made 35 appearances and scored 8 goals during his first spell at the club in 2013.)
14	AM	(Argentina)	~~Juan Varea~~	29	Non-EU	2015	6	2	2017	Free	(Bosnia and Herzegovina) Željezničar Sarajevo	
15	CB	(Bulgaria)	Trayan Trayanov	28	EU	2015	14	1	2016	Free	Lokomotiv Sofia	
17	RB	(Bulgaria)	Martin Kostadinov	20	EU	2014	4	0	2018	Youth system	Cherno More Academy	
18	CM	(Poland)	~~Marcin Burkhardt~~	32	EU	2014	28	3	2016	Free	(Poland) Miedź Legnica	
19	RW	(Martinique)	Mathias Coureur	28	EU	2014	55	16	2016	Free	(Spain) Huracán Valencia	
20	FW	(Bulgaria)	~~Villyan Bijev~~	22	EU	2015	23	3	2016	Free	Slavia	
21	CM	(France)	~~Mehdi Bourabia~~	24	EU	2015	19	3	2017	Free	Lokomotiv Plovdiv	
21	CM	(Bulgaria)	Georgi Iliev (captain)	34	EU	2016	221	52	2017	Free	(China) Shijiazhuang Ever Bright	(Note: Iliev made 207 appearances and scored 48 goals during his first two spells at the club between 2000–2003 and 2008–2013.) (Note: Mihail Venkov was captain during the first half of the season.)
22	CB	(Bulgaria)	Plamen Nikolov	30	EU	2016	14	0	2017	Free	Botev Plovdiv	
23	CB	(Portugal)	~~Ginho~~	30	EU	2015	9	0	2017	Free	(Portugal) Aves	
23	CM	(Bulgaria)	Ivan Valchanov	24	EU	2016	4	0	2018	Free	Slavia	
25	GK	(Bulgaria)	Ivan Dyulgerov	16	EU	2016	0	0		Youth system	Cherno More Academy	
27	RW	(Bulgaria)	Iliyan Nedelchev	20	EU	2015	2	0	2018	Youth system	Spartak Varna	
28	AM	(Serbia)	~~Ivan Marković~~	21	Non-EU	2016	1	0	2018	Free	(Greece) Levadiakos	
33	GK	(Bulgaria)	Georgi Kitanov	21	EU	2012	110	0	2016	Youth system	Cherno More Academy	
40	GK	(Serbia)	Aleksandar Čanović	33	Non-EU	2015	11	0	2016	Free	Free agent	
55	CB	(Bulgaria)	~~Borislav Stoychev~~	29	EU	2016	8	0	2017	Free	(Greece) Atromitos	
70	RB	(Portugal)	Pedro Eugénio	25	EU	2015	17	1	2017	Free	Haskovo	
73	LW	(Bulgaria)	Vladislav Romanov	28	EU	2016	13	0	2018	Free	(Greece) Trikala	
77	LW	(Bulgaria)	Andreas Vasev	25	EU	2015	20	0	2017	Free	Dunav	
84	DM	(Bulgaria)	Todor Palankov	32	EU	2013	91	2	2016	Free	Chernomorets Burgas	(Note: Palankov made 13 appearances during his first spell at the club in 2007.)
98	FW	(Bulgaria)	Valentin Yoskov	17	EU	2015	5	0		Youth system	Cherno More Academy	

- Last updated: 22 May 2016

== Competitions ==
=== Overall ===
==== Competition record ====
Competition	Started round	Current position/round	Final position/round	First match	Last match	Record							
Competition	Started round	Current position/round	Final position/round	First match	Last match	P	W	D	L	GF	GA	GD	Win %
A Group	—	—	6th	19 July 2015	22 May 2016	32	10	8	14	36	45	−9	31.25
Bulgarian Cup	First round	—	Third round	23 September 2015	9 December 2015	3	2	0	1	12	1	+11	66.67
UEFA Europa League	Second qualifying round	—	Second qualifying round	16 July 2015	23 July 2015	2	0	1	1	1	5	−4	0.00
Bulgarian Supercup	—	—	Winners	12 August 2015		1	1	0	0	1	0	+1	100.00
Total						38	13	9	16	50	51	−1	34.21

Updated to match played 22 May 2016
Source: Competitions

==== Summary ====
Clean sheets	12 (9 A Group, 2 Bulgarian Cup, 1 Bulgarian Supercup)
Yellow cards	130 (111 A Group, 8 Bulgarian Cup, 4 Europa League, 7 Bulgarian Supercup)
Red cards	8 (7 A Group, 1 Europa League)
Worst discipline	(Netherlands) Marc Klok (13 (yellow card) , 1 (red card) )
Biggest Win	7–1 vs Pirin Razlog (A) (C)
Biggest Defeat	1–5 vs Levski (A)
Most appearances	(Martinique) Mathias Coureur (40)
Top scorer	(Martinique) Mathias Coureur (12)

=== Pre-season and friendlies ===
27 June 2015	Cherno More	4 – 2	Dunav	Varna
17:30 EEST	Raykov 10', 12'; Bourabia 20'; Petkov 64'	Report	Atanasov 42'; Lozev 89'	Stadium: Mladost; Attendance: 500; Referee: Tsvetan Krastev

1 July 2015	Cherno More	3 – 0	Chernomorets Balchik	Varna
17:30 EEST	Raykov 20'; Burkhardt 63'; B. Atanasov 76'	Report		Stadium: Mladost; Attendance: 200; Referee: Dragomir Draganov

11 July 2015	Cherno More	1 – 0	Lokomotiv Gorna Oryahovitsa	Varna
17:30 EEST	Raykov 12'	Report		Stadium: Ticha; Attendance: 500; Referee: Radoslav Stanev
Note: The game was cancelled after 33 minutes due to pitch invasion by the home fans.

4 September 2015	Viitorul (Romania)	0 – 2	(Bulgaria) Cherno More	Ovidiu, Romania
19:00 EEST		Report	Varea 43'; Atanasov 89'	Stadium: Orășenesc; Attendance: 150

10 October 2015	Dunav	3 – 3	Cherno More	Ruse
16:00 EEST	Budinov 19'; Dimitrov 64'; Dimov 74'	Report	Yoskov 76', 90'; Eugénio 86'	Stadium: Gradski; Attendance: 600; Referee: Ivelin Zanev

14 November 2015	Cherno More (Bulgaria)	1 – 2	(Romania) Viitorul	Balchik
14:00 EET	Eugénio 39'	Report	Cernat 63'; Tănase 81'	Stadium: Gradski; Attendance: 200; Referee: Dragomir Draganov

23 January 2016	Cherno More	2 – 1	Sozopol	Golden Sands
14:00 EET	Eugénio 64'; Yoskov 78'	Report	Sherdenov 20'	Stadium: Sport Palace; Attendance: 200

27 January 2016	Cherno More	1 – 0	Dobrudzha	Golden Sands
14:00 EET	Eugénio 54'	Report		Stadium: Sport Palace; Referee: Dimitar Mihaylov

30 January 2016	Pomorie	1 – 0	Cherno More	Burgas
14:00 EET	Iliev 57'	Report		Stadium: Sharks' Nest; Referee: Zhivko Nedyalkov

6 February 2016 Balchik Cup	Cherno More	2 – 1	Dunav	Balchik
14:30 EET	Iliev 14' (pen.); Yoskov 25'	Report	Kostadinov 2'	Stadium: Gradski; Attendance: 100; Referee: Dragomir Draganov

9 February 2016 Balchik Cup	Cherno More	1 – 0	Balkan Botevgrad	Albena
14:00 EET	Raykov 33'	Report		Stadium: Ground 2 Referee: Petar Kirilov

10 February 2016	Cherno More	3 – 0	Dobrudzha	Varna
14:30 EET	Bacari 3', 8'; Coureur 78'	Report		Stadium: Mladost; Attendance: 300; Referee: Krasen Georgiev

12 February 2016 Balchik Cup	Inter Plachidol	0 – 4	Cherno More	Albena
14:00 EET		Report	Marković 31'; Palankov 62'; Coureur 67', 69'	Attendance: 100; Referee: Miroslav Markov

25 March 2016	Viitorul (Romania)	0 – 0	(Bulgaria) Cherno More	Ovidiu, Romania
17:00 EET		Report		Stadium: Orășenesc

27 March 2016	Cherno More (Bulgaria)	2 – 3	(Russia) Solyaris Moscow	Albena
16:00 EEST	Nedelchev 47'; Rodin 64' (o.g.)	Report	Rodin 55'; Gorbunov 78'; Povarnitsyn 87'	Stadium: Ground 1 Referee: Tsvetan Krastev

30 March 2016	Chernomorets Balchik	0 – 3	Cherno More	Balchik
17:00 EEST		Report	Marković 45', 56'; Coureur 64'	Stadium: Gradski; Attendance: 100; Referee: Dimitar Mihaylov

=== Bulgarian Supercup ===
12 August 2015	Ludogorets	0 – 1	Cherno More	Burgas
20:00 EEST	Dyakov (yellow card) 28'; Quixadá (yellow card) 40'; Sasha (yellow card) 45+4'; Marcelinho (yellow card) 64'; Cafu (yellow card) 90+2'	Report	Bourabia 15'; Coulibaly (yellow card) 42'; Coureur (yellow card) 51'; Klok (yellow card) 54'; Stanchev (yellow card) 58'; Čanović (yellow card) 63'; Bourabia (yellow card) 65'; Palankov (yellow card) 90+3'	Stadium: Lazur; Attendance: 1,810; Referee: Stanislav Todorov

=== A Group ===
==== Matches ====
19 July 2015 1	Pirin Blagoevgrad	1 – 1	Cherno More	Blagoevgrad
18:30 EEST	Toshev 55'; Viyachki (yellow card) 80'	Report	Coureur 90+2'; Varea (yellow card) 17'; Klok (yellow card) 44'	Stadium: Hristo Botev; Attendance: 4,050; Referee: Nikola Popov

26 July 2015 2	Cherno More	2 – 3	Ludogorets	Varna
18:30 EEST	Sténio 75'; Coureur 90+5'; Georgiev (yellow card) 26'; Ginho (yellow card) 44'; Stanchev (yellow card) 54'; Sténio (yellow card) 56'; Bourabia (yellow card) 58'	Report	Marcelinho 6'; Wanderson 63'; Stanchev 89' (o.g.); Sasha (yellow card) 46'; Minev (yellow card) 56'; Wanderson (yellow card) 82'	Stadium: Ticha; Attendance: 3,360; Referee: Georgi Yordanov

2 August 2015 3	Slavia	0 – 1	Cherno More	Sofia
18:30 EEST	Pirgov (yellow card) 47'; Martinov (yellow card) 66'	Report	Bijev 17'; Coureur (yellow card) 27'; Raykov (yellow card) 41'; Trayanov (yellow card) 42'; Klok (yellow card) 45'; Bijev (yellow card) 72'; Georgiev (yellow card) 80'; Bourabia (red card) 85'	Stadium: Ovcha Kupel; Attendance: 230; Referee: Vladimir Valkov

8 August 2015 4	Cherno More	0 – 1	Levski	Varna
17:30 EEST	Bijev (yellow card) 39'; Burkhardt (yellow card) 41'	Report	B. Tsonev 45+1' de Nooijer (yellow card) 20'; Kraev (yellow card) 75'; Kostadinov (yellow card) 84'; Ivanov (yellow card) 90+4'	Stadium: Ticha; Attendance: 4,320; Referee: Vihren Manev

17 August 2015 5	Beroe	1 – 1	Cherno More	Stara Zagora
20:00 EEST	Zehirov 42'; Dinkov (yellow card) 42'; Zehirov (yellow card) 57'; Djoman (yellow card) 86'	Report	Petkov 61'; Raykov (yellow card) 34'; Klok (yellow card) 42'; Petkov (yellow card) 74'; Burkhardt (yellow card) 84'; Palankov (yellow card) 90'	Stadium: Beroe; Attendance: 3,030; Referee: Nikolay Yordanov

22 August 2015 6	Cherno More	1 – 0	Montana	Varna
17:30 EEST	A. Georgiev 51' (o.g.); Klok (yellow card) 54'; Kitanov (yellow card) 66'; Nedelchev (yellow card) 85'; Palankov (yellow card) 90'	Report	G. Angelov (yellow card) 47'; Poplatnik (yellow card) 71'; Pashov (yellow card) 83'	Stadium: Ticha; Attendance: 1,500; Referee: Angel Angelov

29 August 2015 7	Botev Plovdiv	2 – 1	Cherno More	Plovdiv
17:30 EEST	Vasev 71'; Varela 81' (pen.); Baltanov (yellow card) 35' (yellow-red card) 51'; Hristov (yellow card) 38'	Report	Coureur 86'; Stanchev (yellow card) 41'; Sténio (yellow card) 72'	Stadium: Komatevo; Attendance: 2,700; Referee: Martin Stoimenov

11 September 2015 8	Cherno More	2 – 1	Lokomotiv Plovdiv	Varna
16:15 EEST	Varea 22'; Kotev 57' (o.g.); Vasev (yellow card) 53'; Klok (yellow card) 69'; Coulibaly (yellow card) 73'	Report	Karagaren 67'; Bakalov (yellow card) 63'; Kiki (yellow card) 88'	Stadium: Ticha; Attendance: 1,930; Referee: Nikola Popov

18 September 2015 9	Litex	1 – 0	Cherno More	Lovech
20:00 EEST	Johnsen 73'; Boumal (yellow card) 55'	Report	Palankov (yellow card) 20'; Georgiev (yellow card) 35'; Bourabia (yellow card) 60' (yellow-red card) 83'; Burkahrdt (yellow card) 70'; Petkov (yellow card) 89'	Stadium: Lovech; Attendance: 1,150; Referee: Georgi Yordanov

26 September 2015 10	Cherno More	1 – 0	Pirin Blagoevgrad	Varna
16:15 EEST	Raykov 13'; Coureur (yellow card) 37'; Bijev (yellow card) 61'; Bourabia (yellow card) 70'; Sténio (yellow card) 76'	Report	Dyulgerov (yellow card) 22'; Sandanski (yellow card) 24'	Stadium: Ticha; Attendance: 1,300; Referee: Adrian Petrov

3 October 2015 11	Ludogorets	1 – 1	Cherno More	Razgrad
20:00 EEST	Keșerü 55'; Marcelinho (yellow card) 12'; Minev (yellow card) 58'; Terziev (yellow card) 90+4'	Report	Coureur 46'; Petkov (yellow card) 13'; Coulibaly (yellow card) 27'; Georgiev (yellow card) 68'; Bijev (yellow card) 82'; Klok (yellow card) 88'	Stadium: Ludogorets Arena; Attendance: 1,580; Referee: Nikolay Yordanov

17 October 2015 12	Cherno More	1 – 0	Slavia	Varna
16:15 EEST	Coulibaly 76'; Sténio (yellow card) 22'; Georgiev (yellow card) 39'; Coulibaly (yellow card) 58'; Bourabia (yellow card) 64'; Vasev (yellow card) 73'	Report	Dyakov (yellow card) 23'; Ferraresso (yellow card) 28'; Manzorro (yellow card) 37'	Stadium: Ticha; Attendance: 1,760; Referee: Stefan Apostolov

23 October 2015 13	Levski	1 – 0	Cherno More	Sofia
19:45 EEST	Karner 44'; Bedoya (yellow card) 41'; Diaby (yellow card) 50'; Procházka (yellow card) 90+2'	Report	Bijev (yellow card) 28'; Coureur (yellow card) 36'; Klok (yellow card) 37'; Coulibaly (yellow card) 76'; Sténio (yellow card) 82'	Stadium: Georgi Asparuhov; Attendance: 1,750; Referee: Georgi Yordanov

3 November 2015 14	Cherno More	0 – 3	Beroe	Varna
14:30 EET	Stanchev (yellow card) 34'; Venkov (yellow card) 66'; Sténio (yellow card) 73'; Bourabia (yellow card) 90+5'	Report	Milisavljević 28'; Tom 59'; Isa 90+3'; Dinkov (yellow card) 60'	Stadium: Ticha; Attendance: 1,370; Referee: Stanislav Todorov

7 November 2015 15	Montana	0 – 4	Cherno More	Montana
14:00 EET	S. Genchev (yellow card) 44'; Mihov (yellow card) 57'	Report	Bourabia 63'; Coureur 65'; Eugénio 67'; Varea 77'; Palankov (yellow card) 39'	Stadium: Ogosta; Attendance: 900; Referee: Georgi Kabakov

22 November 2015 16	Cherno More	1 – 2	Botev Plovdiv	Varna
14:00 EET	Coureur 59'; Coulibaly (yellow card) 42'; Ginho (yellow card) 87'	Report	Baltanov 43' (pen.); Varela 72'; Nelson (yellow card) 66'	Stadium: Ticha; Attendance: 1,060; Referee: Angel Bayaltsaliev

28 November 2015 17	Lokomotiv Plovdiv	1 – 3	Cherno More	Plovdiv
14:00 EET	Baldovaliev 57'; Kiki (yellow card) 29'	Report	Coureur 7'; Bourabia 39', 90+3' (pen.); Trayanov (yellow card) 29'; Ginho (yellow card) 48'; Venkov (yellow card) 57'; Stanchev (yellow card) 71' (yellow-red card) 76'	Stadium: Lokomotiv; Attendance: 700; Referee: Stanislav Todorov

1 December 2015 18	Cherno More	1 – 1	Litex	Varna
14:00 EET	Raykov 25'; Raykov (yellow card) 26'; Trayanov (yellow card) 43'; Coulibaly (yellow card) 73'	Report	Johnsen 42'; Goranov (yellow card) 36'; Galabov (yellow card) 66'; Kolev (yellow card) 70'	Stadium: Ticha; Attendance: 1,040; Referee: Stanislav Stavrov

6 December 2015 19	Pirin Blagoevgrad	4 – 0	Cherno More	Blagoevgrad
14:00 EET	Sandanski 32'; Trayanov 45+1'; Georgiev 47' (o.g.); Toshev 74'; Tasev (yellow card) 89'	Report	Petkov (yellow card) 54'; Bourabia (yellow card) 64'; Trayanov (yellow card) 90+2'	Stadium: Hristo Botev; Attendance: 2,250; Referee: Vladimir Valkov

12 December 2015 20	Cherno More	0 – 2	Ludogorets	Varna
14:00 EET	Coulibaly (yellow card) 28'; Raykov (yellow card) 44'; Venkov (yellow card) 55'	Report	Cafu 49'; Keșerü 62'; Vitinha (yellow card) 55'	Stadium: Ticha; Attendance: 1,790; Referee: Nikola Popov

21 February 2016 21	Slavia	0 – 0	Cherno More	Sofia
13:00 EET		Report	Palankov (yellow card) 21'; Klok (yellow card) 64'; Sténio (red card) 90+3'	Stadium: Ovcha Kupel; Attendance: 270; Referee: Ivaylo Stoyanov

27 February 2016 22	Cherno More	0 – 2	Levski	Varna
13:00 EET	Palankov (yellow card) 8'; Romanov (yellow card) 13'; Georgiev (yellow card) 25'; Stoychev (yellow card) 35'; Iliev (yellow card) 45+3'; Bacari (yellow card) 69'; Eugénio (yellow card) 71'	Report	Kostadinov 53'; Bedoya 65'; S. Aleksandrov (yellow card) 19'; Bedoya (yellow card) 33'; Minev (yellow card) 90+2'	Stadium: Ticha; Attendance: 3,700; Referee: Stanislav Todorov

3 March 2016 23	Beroe	0 – 0	Cherno More	Stara Zagora
16:30 EET	Penev (yellow card) 29'; Vasilev (yellow card) 64'; Djoman (yellow card) 85'; Zafirov (yellow card) 86'; Morel (yellow card) 90+1'	Report	Stoychev (yellow card) 11'; Bacari (yellow card) 25' (yellow-red card) 33'; Coureur (yellow card) 51'; Kitanov (yellow card) 80'	Stadium: Beroe; Attendance: 2,730; Referee: Georgi Kabakov

6 March 2016 24	Cherno More	1 – 1	Montana	Varna
14:00 EET	Sténio 54'; Iliev (yellow card) 39'; Sténio (yellow card) 90+5'	Report	A. Georgiev 50'; Iliev (yellow card) 17'; Pashov (yellow card) 17'; Muradov (yellow card) 55'; Ivanov (yellow card) 70'; Todorov (yellow card) 80'; A. Georgiev (yellow card) 90+5'	Stadium: Ticha; Attendance: 940; Referee: Martin Stoimenov

13 March 2016 25	Botev Plovdiv	3 – 1	Cherno More	Plovdiv
14:00 EET	Gamakov 30'; Baltanov 63' (pen.), 68'; Starokin (yellow card) 32'; Milev (yellow card) 72'; Nelson (yellow card) 87'	Report	Raykov 33'; Bacari (yellow card) 52'; Stoychev (yellow card) 62'; Eugénio (yellow card) 66'; Sténio (yellow card) 77'	Stadium: Komatevo; Attendance: 1,210; Referee: Georgi Dimitrov

20 March 2016 26	Cherno More	1 – 1	Lokomotiv Plovdiv	Varna
14:00 EET	Coureur 55'; Raykov (red card) 9'; Petkov (yellow card) 90+1'	Report	Kamburov 10' (pen.); Velkovski (yellow card) 21'; El Kharroubi (yellow card) 90+1'; Stoyanov (yellow card) 90+3'	Stadium: Ticha; Attendance: 760; Referee: Tasko Taskov

27	Litex	v	Cherno More	Lovech
				Stadium: Lovech

9 April 2016 28	Cherno More	1 – 1	Pirin Blagoevgrad	Varna
17:15 EEST	Coureur 90+3'; Stoychev (yellow card) 60'; Sténio (yellow card) 72'; Klok (yellow card) 76' (yellow-red card) 84'	Report	Blagov 86'; Popev (yellow card) 44'	Stadium: Ticha; Attendance: 780; Referee: Georgi Davidov

15 April 2016 29	Ludogorets	2 – 1	Cherno More	Razgrad
20:15 EEST	Wanderson 9'; Keșerü 72' (pen.); Natanael (yellow card) 90+2'	Report	Iliev 31'; Iliev (yellow card) 21'; Bacari (yellow card) 29'; Stoychev (yellow card) 52'; Georgiev (yellow card) 63'; P. Nikolov (yellow card) 71'; Venkov (yellow card) 87'	Stadium: Ludogorets Arena; Attendance: 2,680; Referee: Vladimir Valkov

23 April 2016 30	Cherno More	3 – 2	Slavia	Varna
17:15 EEST	Trayanov 6'; Bacari 56', 82'; Iliev (yellow card) 43'; Palankov (yellow card) 59'; Raykov (yellow card) 67'; Bacari (yellow card) 83'	Report	Baldzhiyski 15'; Pirgov 37'; Karabelyov (yellow card) 39'; Stoev (yellow card) 55'	Stadium: Ticha; Attendance: 840; Referee: Georgi Kabakov

28 April 2016 31	Levski	5 – 1	Cherno More	Sofia
19:30 EEST	Kraev 8'; Hristov 34', 68', 74'; Bedoya 86'; Karner (yellow card) 90+2'	Report	Georgiev 12'; Stoychev (yellow card) 39'; Georgiev (yellow card) 70'; Bacari (yellow card) 90+3'	Stadium: Georgi Asparuhov; Attendance: 1,940; Referee: Nikola Popov

6 May 2016 32	Cherno More	1 – 0	Beroe	Varna
15:30 EEST	Iliev 21'	Report	Vasilev (yellow card) 44'; Tom (yellow card) 52'; Delev (yellow card) 53'; Penev (yellow card) 76'	Stadium: Ticha; Attendance: 580; Referee: Stefan Pavlov

10 May 2016 33	Montana	3 – 2	Cherno More	Montana
18:00 EEST	Kokonov 28'; Stoyanov 54'; Iliev 90+1'; Michev (yellow card) 71'; Angelov (yellow card) 75'; Atanasov (yellow card) 88'; S. Georgiev (yellow card) 90+2'	Report	Raykov 30'; Coureur 82' (pen.); Palankov (yellow card) 45+1'; Klok (yellow card) 77'; Bacari (yellow card) 79'	Stadium: Ogosta; Attendance: 450; Referee: Georgi Kabakov

14 May 2016 34	Cherno More	3 – 0	Botev Plovdiv	Varna
18:00 EEST	Bacari 25'; Iliev 59'; Coureur 88'; Venkov (yellow card) 45+1'	Report	Yusein (yellow card) 60'	Stadium: Ticha; Attendance: 470; Referee: Martin Stoimenov

22 May 2016 35	Lokomotiv Plovdiv	2 – 1	Cherno More	Plovdiv
18:00 EEST	Kamburov 12'; Kiki 59'; Trajanov (yellow card) 37'	Report	Iliev 55'; Klok (yellow card) 31'; Bacari (yellow card) 63'	Stadium: Lokomotiv; Attendance: 1,180; Referee: Angel Angelov

36	Cherno More	v	Litex	Varna
				Stadium: Ticha

==== League table ====
Pos	Team	Pld	W	D	L	GF	GA	GD	Pts	Qualification or relegation
4	Slavia Sofia	32	14	7	11	36	29	+7	49 (Note: Slavia Sofia ahead of Lokomotiv Plovdiv on head-to-head record; Slavia Sofia–Lokomotiv Plovdiv 3–0, Lokomotiv Plovdiv–Slavia Sofia 2–0, Slavia Sofia–Lokomotiv Plovdiv 3–0, Lokomotiv Plovdiv–Slavia Sofia 3–1.)	Qualification for the Europa League first qualifying round
5	Lokomotiv Plovdiv	32	15	4	13	40	45	−5	49	
6	Cherno More	32	10	8	14	36	45	−9	38	
7	Botev Plovdiv	32	8	9	15	27	44	−17	33	
8	Pirin Blagoevgrad	32	5	11	16	27	45	−18	26	

Source: Bulgarian Football Association, Soccerway
Rules for classification: 1) Points; 2) Head-to-head points; 3) Head-to-head goal difference; 4) Head-to-head goals scored; 5) Head-to-head away goals scored (only if two teams); 6) Goal difference; 7) Goals scored; 8) Fairplay ranking; 9) Draw.

==== Results summary ====
Overall								Home						Away					
Pld	W	D	L	GF	GA	GD	Pts	W	D	L	GF	GA	GD	W	D	L	GF	GA	GD
32	10	8	14	36	45	−9	38	7	3	6	18	19	−1	3	5	8	18	26	−8

Last updated: 22 May 2016.
Source: bulgarian-football.com

==== League performance ====
Round	1	2	3	4	5	6	7	8	9	10	11	12	13	14	15	16	17	18	19	20	21	22	23	24	25	26	27	28	29	30	31	32	33	34	35	36
Ground	A	H	A	H	A	H	A	H	A	H	A	H	A	H	A	H	A	H	A	H	A	H	A	H	A	H	A	H	A	H	A	H	A	H	A	H
Result	D	L	W	L	D	W	L	W	V	W	D	W	L	L	W	L	W	V	L	L	D	L	D	D	L	D	V	D	L	W	L	W	L	W	L	V
Position	4	7	6	8	7	6	7	6	6	5	6	5	6	6	6	6	5	5	6	5	5	5	5	5	6	6	6	6	7	6	6	6	6	6	6	6

Source: bulgarian-football.com
A = Away; H = Home; W = Win; D = Draw; L = Loss; V = Annulled

==== Score overview ====
Opposition	Home score	Away score	Home score	Away score	Double	Treble	Quadruple
	First phase		Second phase				
Beroe	0–3	1–1	1–0	0–0	No	No	No
Botev Plovdiv	1–2	1–2	3–0	1–3	No	No	No
Levski	0–1	0–1	0–2	1–5	No	No	No
Litex	1–1	0–1			No	No	No
Lokomotiv Plovdiv	2–1	3–1	1–1	1–2	Yes	No	No
Ludogorets	2–3	1–1	0–2	1–2	No	No	No
Montana	1–0	4–0	1–1	2–3	Yes	No	No
Pirin Blagoevgrad	1–0	1–1	1–1	0–4	No	No	No
Slavia	1–0	1–0	3–2	0–0	Yes	Yes	No

=== Bulgarian Cup ===
23 September 2015 1st round	Pirin Razlog	1 – 7	Cherno More	Razlog
16:00 EEST	D. Dimitrov 53'	Report	Bijev 23', 54', 74'; Rasim 34'; Raykov 38', 90'; Klok 58'; Raykov (yellow card)	Stadium: Gradski; Referee: Angel Angelov

27 October 2015 2nd round	Vihar Stroevo	0 – 5	Cherno More	Plovdiv
13:30 EET		Report	Raykov 39', 47'; Varea 43'; Yoskov 54'; Kostadinov 85'; Stanchev (yellow card) 28'	Stadium: Komatevo; Attendance: 450; Referee: Stoyan Denev

9 December 2015 3rd round	Beroe	0 – 0 (a.e.t.) (5 – 3 p)	Cherno More	Stara Zagora
17:30 EET	Isa (yellow card) 39'; Delev (yellow card) 70' (yellow-red card) 118'	Report	Palankov (yellow card) 33'; Georgiev (yellow card) 37'; Klok (yellow card) 39'; Rasim (yellow card) 79'; Trayanov (yellow card) 97'; Burkhardt (yellow card) 116'	Stadium: Beroe; Attendance: 1,850; Referee: Georgi Kabakov
	Penalties
	Dinkov (penalty scored); Ivanov (penalty scored); Kostov (penalty scored); Isa (penalty scored); Elias (penalty scored)		(penalty scored) Sténio; (penalty missed) Burkhardt; (penalty scored) Rasim; (penalty scored) Eugénio

=== Europa League ===
16 July 2015 2nd qualifying round/1st leg	Cherno More (Bulgaria)	1 – 1	(Belarus) Dinamo Minsk	Razgrad, Bulgaria
20:00 EEST	Coureur 11'; Klok (yellow card) 70'	Report	Palitsevich 72'; Vitus (yellow card) 27'; Palitsevich (yellow card) 46'; Bangura (yellow card) 49'	Stadium: Ludogorets Arena; Attendance: 3,650; Referee: Tobias Stieler (Germany)

23 July 2015 2nd qualifying round/2nd leg	Dinamo Minsk (Belarus)	4 – 0 (5 – 1 agg.)	(Bulgaria) Cherno More	Minsk, Belarus
18:00 FET	Karytska 41'; Adamović 58'; Bećiraj 86', 90+2'; Bećiraj (yellow card) 28'; Begunov (yellow card) 39'; Karytska (yellow card) 45+1'; Korzun (yellow card) 54'	Report	Bijev (yellow card) 28'; Palankov (yellow card) 40' (yellow-red card) 45+1'; Coureur (yellow card) 49'; Coulibaly (yellow card) 66'	Stadium: Traktor; Attendance: 2,616; Referee: Anatolii Zhabchenko (Ukraine)

== Statistics ==
=== Player appearances ===
Key:
‡ On loan from another club * First appearance(s) for the club

- # = Squad number
- **Pos** = Playing position
- **P** = Number of games played
- **G** = Number of goals scored
- **GK** = Goalkeeper
- **DF** = Defender
- **MF** = Midfielder
- **FW** = Forward
- = Yellow cards
- = Red cards
- † Permanent player left club during the season
- ¤ Loaned to another club for part or all of season

Correct as of 22 May 2016. Starting appearances are listed first, followed by substitute appearances in parentheses where applicable.

No.	Pos	Name	P	G	P	G	P	G	P	G	P	G	A yellow card	A red card	Notes
No.	Pos	Name	League		Bulgarian Cup		Europe		Other		Total		Discipline		Notes
1	GK	(Bulgaria) Iliya Nikolov †	0(1)	0	0	0	0	0	0	0	0(1)	0	0	0	
3	MF	(Bulgaria) Daniel Georgiev	21(5)	1	3	0	0(1)	0	0(1)	0	24(7)	1	9	0	
4	DF	(Bulgaria) Mihail Venkov (c)	33	0	2	0	2	0	1	0	38	0	5	0	
5	DF	(Bulgaria) Stefan Stanchev	12(1)	0	1	0	2	0	1	0	16(1)	0	5	1	
6	DF	(Mali) Mamoutou Coulibaly	17(3)	1	1	0	2	0	1	0	21(3)	1	9	0	
7	MF	(Bulgaria) Bekir Rasim	3(6)	0	2	1	0	0	0	0	5(6)	1	1	0	
8	MF	(Cape Verde) Sténio	25(3)	2	0(1)	0	0(2)	0	1	0	26(6)	2	9	1	
9	FW	(Spain) Bacari	7(4)	3	0	0	0	0	0	0	7(4)	3	7	1	
10	MF	(Netherlands) Marc Klok	23(1)	0	2	1	2	0	1	0	28(1)	1	**13**	1	
11	FW	(Bulgaria) Zhivko Petkov	7(14)	1	1	0	0	0	1	0	9(14)	1	5	0	
13	MF	(Bulgaria) Simeon Raykov	20(5)	4	2(1)	4	2	0	0	0	24(6)	8	6	1	
14	FW	(Argentina) Juan Varea †	3(3)	2	1(1)	1	0(1)	0	0	0	4(5)	3	1	0	
15	DF	(Bulgaria) Trayan Trayanov	13(1)	1	2	0	0	0	1	0	16(1)	1	5	0	
17	DF	(Bulgaria) Martin Kostadinov	1	0	0(1)	1	0	0	0	0	1(1)	1	0	0	
18	MF	(Poland) Marcin Burkhardt †	3(6)	0	1(1)	0	2	0	0	0	6(7)	0	4	0	
19	MF	(Martinique) Mathias Coureur	**33(1)**	**11**	2(1)	0	2	1	1	0	**38(2)**	**12**	6	0	
20	FW	(Bulgaria) Villyan Bijev †	5(7)	1	1	3	2	0	0	0	8(7)	4	6	0	
21	MF	(France) Mehdi Bourabia †	19	3	0	0	2	0	1	1	22	4	6	2	
21	MF	(Bulgaria) Georgi Iliev (c)	14	4	0	0	0	0	0	0	14	4	4	0	
22	DF	(Bulgaria) Plamen Nikolov	14	0	0	0	0	0	0	0	14	0	1	0	
23	DF	(Portugal) Ginho †	9	0	1(1)	0	0	0	0(1)	0	10(2)	0	3	0	
23	MF	(Bulgaria) Ivan Valchanov	0(4)	0	0	0	0	0	0	0	0(4)	0	0	0	
25	GK	(Bulgaria) Ivan Dyulgerov	0	0	0	0	0	0	0	0	0	0	0	0	
27	MF	(Bulgaria) Iliyan Nedelchev	0(1)	0	1(1)	0	0	0	0	0	1(2)	0	1	0	
28	MF	(Serbia) Ivan Marković †	0(1)	0	0	0	0	0	0	0	0(1)	0	0	0	
33	GK	(Bulgaria) Georgi Kitanov	33	0	1	0	0	0	1	0	35	0	2	0	
40	GK	(Serbia) Aleksandar Čanović	1	0	2	0	2	0	0	0	5	0	1	0	
55	DF	(Bulgaria) Borislav Stoychev †	8	0	0	0	0	0	0	0	8	0	5	0	
70	DF	(Portugal) Pedro Eugénio	13(4)	1	2	0	0	0	0	0	15(4)	1	2	0	
73	MF	(Bulgaria) Vladislav Romanov	8(5)	0	0	0	0	0	0	0	8(5)	0	1	0	
77	MF	(Bulgaria) Andreas Vasev	8(12)	0	2(1)	0	0(2)	0	1	0	11(15)	0	2	0	
84	MF	(Bulgaria) Todor Palankov	21(5)	0	2	0	2	0	0(1)	0	25(6)	0	10	1	
98	FW	(Bulgaria) Valentin Yoskov	0(5)	0	1	1	0	0	0	0	1(5)	1	0	0	

=== Minutes on the pitch ===
Includes injury time. Positions indicate the most natural position of the particular player, followed by alternative positions where he actually started games during the course of the season.

No.	Position	Alternative Position(s)	Player	A Group	Bulgarian Cup	Europa League	Bulgarian Supercup	Total
1	GK		(Bulgaria) Iliya Nikolov	34	0	0	0	34
3	CM	DM / CB / RB / RW / LB	(Bulgaria) Daniel Georgiev	2057	**310**	49	18	2434
4	LB	CB / LWB	(Bulgaria) Mihail Venkov	**3164**	187	194	100	3645
5	RB	CB	(Bulgaria) Stefan Stanchev	995	84	194	100	1373
6	CB	RB	(Mali) Mamoutou Coulibaly	1608	119	194	100	2021
7	AM	CM	(Bulgaria) Bekir Rasim	321	218	0	0	539
8	DM	AM / CB / RB / CM	(Cape Verde) Sténio	2313	50	76	100	2539
9	FW		(Spain) Bacari	684	0	0	0	684
10	CM	DM	(Netherlands) Marc Klok	2116	168	145	82	2511
11	FW		(Bulgaria) Zhivko Petkov	881	91	0	100	1072
13	LW	RW / FW	(Bulgaria) Simeon Raykov	1585	209	194	0	1988
14	AM	FW	(Argentina) Juan Varea	281	123	36	0	440
15	CB	DM	(Bulgaria) Trayan Trayanov	1305	219	0	26	1550
17	RB	RW	(Bulgaria) Martin Kostadinov	46	8	0	0	54
18	CM	AM	(Poland) Marcin Burkhardt	358	73	118	0	549
19	RW	LW / CB / FW	(Martinique) Mathias Coureur	3163	245	172	100	**3680**
20	FW	AM	(Bulgaria) Villyan Bijev	575	91	129	0	795
21	CM	AM	(France) Mehdi Bourabia	1801	0	194	100	2095
21	CM	AM	(Bulgaria) Georgi Iliev	1310	0	0	0	1310
22	CB		(Bulgaria) Plamen Nikolov	1282	0	0	0	1282
23	CB		(Portugal) Ginho	714	123	0	74	911
23	CM		(Bulgaria) Ivan Valchanov	57	0	0	0	57
25	GK		(Bulgaria) Ivan Dyulgerov	0	0	0	0	0
27	RW		(Bulgaria) Iliyan Nedelchev	15	59	0	0	74
28	AM		(Serbia) Ivan Marković	22	0	0	0	22
33	GK		(Bulgaria) Georgi Kitanov	3130	127	0	100	3357
40	GK		(Serbia) Aleksandar Čanović	95	183	194	0	472
55	CB		(Bulgaria) Borislav Stoychev	707	0	0	0	707
70	RB	RW / LW / RWB	(Portugal) Pedro Eugénio	1203	219	0	0	1422
73	LW	RW	(Bulgaria) Vladislav Romanov	706	0	0	0	706
77	LW	RW	(Bulgaria) Andreas Vasev	907	225	51	84	1267
84	DM	CB / CM / AM	(Bulgaria) Todor Palankov	2113	187	144	16	2460
98	FW		(Bulgaria) Valentin Yoskov	102	92	0	0	194

Correct as of match played on 22 May 2016.

=== Débuts ===
Players making their first team Cherno More début in a competitive match.

No.	Position	Player	Date	Opponents	Ground	Competition
21	MF	(France) Mehdi Bourabia	16 July 2015	(Belarus) Dinamo Minsk	Ludogorets Arena	Europa League
14	FW	(Argentina) Juan Varea	16 July 2015	(Belarus) Dinamo Minsk	Ludogorets Arena	Europa League
77	MF	(Bulgaria) Andreas Vasev	16 July 2015	(Belarus) Dinamo Minsk	Ludogorets Arena	Europa League
15	DF	(Bulgaria) Trayan Trayanov	26 July 2015	Ludogorets	Ticha Stadium	A Group
23	DF	(Portugal) Ginho	26 July 2015	Ludogorets	Ticha Stadium	A Group
70	DF	(Portugal) Pedro Eugénio	3 October 2015	Ludogorets	Ludogorets Arena	A Group
98	FW	(Bulgaria) Valentin Yoskov	23 October 2015	Levski	Georgi Asparuhov Stadium	A Group
22	DF	(Bulgaria) Plamen Nikolov	21 February 2016	Slavia	Ovcha Kupel Stadium	A Group
73	MF	(Bulgaria) Vladislav Romanov	21 February 2016	Slavia	Ovcha Kupel Stadium	A Group
23	MF	(Bulgaria) Ivan Valchanov	21 February 2016	Slavia	Ovcha Kupel Stadium	A Group
55	DF	(Bulgaria) Borislav Stoychev	27 February 2016	Levski	Ticha Stadium	A Group
28	MF	(Serbia) Ivan Marković	20 March 2016	Lokomotiv Plovdiv	Ticha Stadium	A Group

=== Goalscorers ===
Rank	Pos.	Player	L	C	EL	SC	Total
1	MF	(Martinique) Mathias Coureur	11	0	1	0	12
2	MF	(Bulgaria) Simeon Raykov	4	4	0	0	8
3	MF	(Bulgaria) Georgi Iliev	4	0	0	0	4
3	MF	(France) Mehdi Bourabia	3	0	0	1	4
3	FW	(Bulgaria) Villyan Bijev	1	3	0	0	4
4	FW	(Spain) Bacari	3	0	0	0	3
4	FW	(Argentina) Juan Varea	2	1	0	0	3
5	MF	(Cape Verde) Sténio	2	0	0	0	2
6	FW	(Bulgaria) Zhivko Petkov	1	0	0	0	1
6	DF	(Mali) Mamoutou Coulibaly	1	0	0	0	1
6	DF	(Portugal) Pedro Eugénio	1	0	0	0	1
6	DF	(Bulgaria) Trayan Trayanov	1	0	0	0	1
6	MF	(Bulgaria) Daniel Georgiev	1	0	0	0	1
6	MF	(Bulgaria) Bekir Rasim	0	1	0	0	1
6	MF	(Netherlands) Marc Klok	0	1	0	0	1
6	FW	(Bulgaria) Valentin Yoskov	0	1	0	0	1
6	DF	(Bulgaria) Martin Kostadinov	0	1	0	0	1
Own goals			2	0	0	0	2
**Totals**			**37**	**12**	**1**	**1**	51

Last updated: 22 May 2016

=== Assists ===
Rank	Pos.	Player	L	C	EL	SC	Total
1	MF	(Martinique) Mathias Coureur	6	0	0	0	6
2	MF	(Bulgaria) Andreas Vasev	3	1	0	0	4
2	MF	(Bulgaria) Simeon Raykov	2	2	0	0	4
3	MF	(France) Mehdi Bourabia	3	0	0	0	3
3	MF	(Bulgaria) Daniel Georgiev	3	0	0	0	3
3	MF	(Bulgaria) Todor Palankov	3	0	0	0	3
3	MF	(Bulgaria) Georgi Iliev	3	0	0	0	3
3	MF	(Netherlands) Marc Klok	2	1	0	0	3
3	DF	(Bulgaria) Stefan Stanchev	2	0	0	1	3
4	FW	(Argentina) Juan Varea	0	2	0	0	2
5	DF	(Portugal) Pedro Eugénio	1	0	0	0	1
5	MF	(Bulgaria) Bekir Rasim	0	1	0	0	1
5	FW	(Bulgaria) Valentin Yoskov	0	1	0	0	1
**Totals**			**28**	**8**	**0**	**1**	37

Last updated: 22 May 2016

=== Goalscorers' effectiveness ===
==== Goals per game ====
Includes games in all official competitions. Substitute appearances count as a game played.

Rank	Player	Position	GPG Ratio
1	(Bulgaria) Martin Kostadinov	RB	0.500
2	(Argentina) Juan Varea	FW	0.333
3	(Martinique) Mathias Coureur	RW	0.300
4	(Bulgaria) Georgi Iliev	CM	0.286
5	(Spain) Bacari	FW	0.273
6	(Bulgaria) Simeon Raykov	LW	0.267
6	(Bulgaria) Villyan Bijev	FW	0.267
7	(France) Mehdi Bourabia	CM	0.182
8	(Bulgaria) Valentin Yoskov	FW	0.167
9	(Bulgaria) Bekir Rasim	AM	0.091
10	(Cape Verde) Sténio	DM	0.063
11	(Bulgaria) Trayan Trayanov	CB	0.059
12	(Portugal) Pedro Eugénio	RB	0.053
13	(Bulgaria) Zhivko Petkov	FW	0.043
14	(Mali) Mamoutou Coulibaly	CB	0.042
15	(Netherlands) Marc Klok	CM	0.034
16	(Bulgaria) Daniel Georgiev	CM	0.032

Correct as of match played on 22 May 2016.

==== Minutes per goal ====
Takes into account the actual time spent on the pitch (including injury time) in all official competitions.

Rank	Player	Position	MPG Ratio
1	(Bulgaria) Martin Kostadinov	RB	54
2	(Argentina) Juan Varea	FW	146.7
3	(Bulgaria) Valentin Yoskov	FW	194
4	(Bulgaria) Villyan Bijev	FW	198.8
5	(Spain) Bacari	FW	228
6	(Bulgaria) Simeon Raykov	LW	248.5
7	(Martinique) Mathias Coureur	RW	306.7
8	(Bulgaria) Georgi Iliev	CM	327.5
9	(France) Mehdi Bourabia	CM	523.8
10	(Bulgaria) Bekir Rasim	AM	539
11	(Bulgaria) Zhivko Petkov	FW	1072
12	(Cape Verde) Sténio	DM	1269.5
13	(Portugal) Pedro Eugénio	RB	1422
14	(Bulgaria) Trayan Trayanov	CB	1550
15	(Mali) Mamoutou Coulibaly	CB	2021
16	(Bulgaria) Daniel Georgiev	CM	2434
17	(Netherlands) Marc Klok	CM	2511

Correct as of match played on 22 May 2016.

=== Own goals ===
Own goals in favour
Date	Pos.	Player	Opponent	Competition
22 Aug	DF	(Bulgaria) Asen Georgiev	Montana	A Group
11 Sept	DF	(Bulgaria) Kiril Kotev	Lokomotiv Plovdiv	A Group

Own goals conceded
Date	Pos.	Player	Opponent	Competition
26 Jul	DF	(Bulgaria) Stefan Stanchev	Ludogorets	A Group
6 Dec	MF	(Bulgaria) Daniel Georgiev	Pirin Blagoevgrad	A Group

=== Clean sheets ===
R	No.	Nat	Goalkeeper	L	C	EL	SC	Total
1	33	(Bulgaria)	Georgi Kitanov	9	1	–	1	**11**
2	40	(Serbia)	Aleksandar Čanović	0	1	0	–	**1**
			**Totals**	**9**	**2**	**0**	**1**	**12**

Last updated: 22 May 2016

=== Disciplinary record ===
Correct as of 22 May 2016
Players are listed in descending order of (yellow card)
Players with the same amount of cards are listed by their position on the club's official website

**R.**	**No.**	**Nat**	**Pos**	**Name**	**A Group**			**Bulgarian Cup**			**Europa League**			**Bulgarian Supercup**			**Total**		
**R.**	**No.**	**Nat**	**Pos**	**Name**	Booked	(yellow card) (yellow-red card)	Sent off (straight red)	Booked	(yellow card) (yellow-red card)	Sent off (straight red)	Booked	(yellow card) (yellow-red card)	Sent off (straight red)	Booked	(yellow card) (yellow-red card)	Sent off (straight red)	Booked	(yellow card) (yellow-red card)	Sent off (straight red)
1	10	(Netherlands)	MF	Marc Klok	10	1	0	1	0	0	1	0	0	1	0	0	13	1	0
2	84	(Bulgaria)	MF	Todor Palankov	8	0	0	1	0	0	0	1	0	1	0	0	10	1	0
3	8	(Cape Verde)	MF	Sténio	9	0	1	0	0	0	0	0	0	0	0	0	9	0	1
4	21	(France)	MF	Mehdi Bourabia	5	1	1	0	0	0	0	0	0	1	0	0	6	1	1
5	3	(Bulgaria)	MF	Daniel Georgiev	8	0	0	1	0	0	0	0	0	0	0	0	9	0	0
5	6	(Mali)	DF	Mamoutou Coulibaly	7	0	0	0	0	0	1	0	0	1	0	0	9	0	0
5	9	(Spain)	FW	Bacari	7	1	0	0	0	0	0	0	0	0	0	0	7	1	0
6	13	(Bulgaria)	MF	Simeon Raykov	5	0	1	1	0	0	0	0	0	0	0	0	6	0	1
7	5	(Bulgaria)	DF	Stefan Stanchev	3	1	0	1	0	0	0	0	0	1	0	0	5	1	0
8	19	(Martinique)	MF	Mathias Coureur	4	0	0	0	0	0	1	0	0	1	0	0	6	0	0
8	20	(Bulgaria)	FW	Villyan Bijev	5	0	0	0	0	0	1	0	0	0	0	0	6	0	0
8	55	(Bulgaria)	DF	Borislav Stoychev	6	0	0	0	0	0	0	0	0	0	0	0	6	0	0
9	4	(Bulgaria)	DF	Mihail Venkov	5	0	0	0	0	0	0	0	0	0	0	0	5	0	0
9	11	(Bulgaria)	FW	Zhivko Petkov	5	0	0	0	0	0	0	0	0	0	0	0	5	0	0
9	15	(Bulgaria)	DF	Trayan Trayanov	4	0	0	1	0	0	0	0	0	0	0	0	5	0	0
10	18	(Poland)	MF	Marcin Burkhardt	3	0	0	1	0	0	0	0	0	0	0	0	4	0	0
10	21	(Bulgaria)	MF	Georgi Iliev	4	0	0	0	0	0	0	0	0	0	0	0	4	0	0
11	23	(Portugal)	DF	Ginho	3	0	0	0	0	0	0	0	0	0	0	0	3	0	0
12	33	(Bulgaria)	GK	Georgi Kitanov	2	0	0	0	0	0	0	0	0	0	0	0	2	0	0
12	70	(Portugal)	DF	Pedro Eugénio	2	0	0	0	0	0	0	0	0	0	0	0	2	0	0
12	77	(Bulgaria)	MF	Andreas Vasev	2	0	0	0	0	0	0	0	0	0	0	0	2	0	0
13	7	(Bulgaria)	MF	Bekir Rasim	0	0	0	1	0	0	0	0	0	0	0	0	1	0	0
13	14	(Argentina)	FW	Juan Varea	1	0	0	0	0	0	0	0	0	0	0	0	1	0	0
13	22	(Bulgaria)	DF	Plamen Nikolov	1	0	0	0	0	0	0	0	0	0	0	0	1	0	0
13	27	(Bulgaria)	MF	Iliyan Nedelchev	1	0	0	0	0	0	0	0	0	0	0	0	1	0	0
13	40	(Serbia)	GK	Aleksandar Čanović	0	0	0	0	0	0	0	0	0	1	0	0	1	0	0
13	73	(Bulgaria)	MF	Vladislav Romanov	1	0	0	0	0	0	0	0	0	0	0	0	1	0	0
				**TOTALS**	**111**	**4**	**3**	**8**	**0**	**0**	**4**	**1**	**0**	**7**	**0**	**0**	**130**	**5**	**3**

==== Suspensions served ====
Date	Matches Missed	Player	Reason	Opponents Missed
30 May 2015	1	(Cape Verde) Sténio	(red card) vs Levski (previous season)	Pirin Blagoevgrad (A)
2 August 2015	1	(France) Mehdi Bourabia	(red card) vs Slavia	Levski (H)
11 September 2015	1	(Netherlands) Marc Klok	5th (yellow card) vs Lokomotiv Plovdiv	Litex (A)
18 September 2015	1	(France) Mehdi Bourabia	(red card) vs Litex	Pirin Razlog (A) (C)
17 October 2015	1	(Bulgaria) Daniel Georgiev	5th (yellow card) vs Slavia	Levski (A)
23 October 2015	1	(Bulgaria) Villyan Bijev	5th (yellow card) vs Levski	Vihar Stroevo (A) (C)
23 October 2015	1	(Cape Verde) Sténio	5th (yellow card) vs Levski	Vihar Stroevo (A) (C)
22 November 2015	1	(Mali) Mamoutou Coulibaly	5th (yellow card) vs Botev Plovdiv	Lokomotiv Plovdiv (A)
28 November 2015	1	(Bulgaria) Stefan Stanchev	(red card) vs Lokomotiv Plovdiv	Litex (H)
6 December 2015	1	(France) Mehdi Bourabia	5th (yellow card) vs Pirin Blagoevgrad	Beroe (A) (C)
9 December 2015	1	(Bulgaria) Todor Palankov	5th (yellow card) vs Beroe	Ludogorets (H)
9 December 2015	1	(Bulgaria) Trayan Trayanov	5th (yellow card) vs Beroe	Ludogorets (H)
12 December 2015	1	(Bulgaria) Simeon Raykov	5th (yellow card) vs Ludogorets	Slavia (A)
21 February 2016	2	(Netherlands) Marc Klok	9th (yellow card) vs Slavia	Levski (H), Beroe (A)
21 February 2016	1	(Cape Verde) Sténio	(red card) vs Slavia	Levski (H)
3 March 2016	1	(Spain) Bacari	(red card) vs Beroe	Montana (H)
20 March 2016	1	(Bulgaria) Simeon Raykov	(red card) vs Lokomotiv Plovdiv	Pirin Blagoevgrad (H)
20 March 2016	1	(Bulgaria) Zhivko Petkov	5th (yellow card) vs Lokomotiv Plovdiv	Pirin Blagoevgrad (H)
9 April 2016	2	(Cape Verde) Sténio	9th (yellow card) vs Pirin Blagoevgrad	Ludogorets (A), Slavia (H)
9 April 2016	1	(Netherlands) Marc Klok	(red card) vs Pirin Blagoevgrad	Ludogorets (A)
15 April 2016	1	(Bulgaria) Borislav Stoychev	5th (yellow card) vs Ludogorets	Slavia (H)
28 April 2016	2	(Bulgaria) Daniel Georgiev	9th (yellow card) vs Levski	Beroe (H), Montana (A)
28 April 2016	1	(Spain) Bacari	5th (yellow card) vs Levski	Beroe (H)
10 May 2016	2	(Bulgaria) Todor Palankov	9th (yellow card) vs Montana	Botev Plovdiv (H), Lokomotiv Plovdiv (A)
14 May 2016	1	(Bulgaria) Mihail Venkov	5th (yellow card) vs Botev Plovdiv	Lokomotiv Plovdiv (A)

=== Injuries ===
Players in bold are still out from their injuries.
Players listed will/have miss(ed) at least one competitive game (missing from whole match day squad).

Date	No.	Pos.	Name	Injury	Note	Recovery time	Games missed	Source
11 July 2015	9	FW	(Spain) Bacari	Ruptured ACL	Occurred during pre-season match against Lokomotiv Gorna Oryahovitsa.	6 months	26	
25 July 2015	18	MF	(Poland) Marcin Burkhardt	Achilles tendon injury	Occurred during training.	Exact time unknown	1	
31 July 2015	7	MF	(Bulgaria) Bekir Rasim	Pulled hamstring	Occurred during training.	Exact time unknown	4	
12 August 2015	15	DF	(Bulgaria) Trayan Trayanov	Pulled hamstring	Occurred during match against Ludogorets.	Exact time unknown	3	
21 August 2015	13	MF	(Bulgaria) Simeon Raykov	Achilles tendon injury	Occurred during training.	Exact time unknown	3	
9 September 2015	8	MF	(Cape Verde) Sténio	Pulled hamstring	Occurred during training.	Exact time unknown	3	
11 September 2015	5	DF	(Bulgaria) Stefan Stanchev	Tendon damage	Occurred during match against Lokomotiv Plovdiv.	Exact time unknown	4	
11 September 2015	15	DF	(Bulgaria) Trayan Trayanov	Pulled hamstring	Occurred during match against Lokomotiv Plovdiv.	Exact time unknown	5	
18 September 2015	6	DF	(Mali) Mamoutou Coulibaly	Knee injury	Occurred during match against Litex.	Exact time unknown	1	
2 October 2015	23	DF	(Portugal) Ginho	Unknown injury	Occurred during training.	Exact time unknown	1	
2 October 2015	18	MF	(Poland) Marcin Burkhardt	Unknown injury	Occurred during training.	Exact time unknown	2	
17 October 2015	11	FW	(Bulgaria) Zhivko Petkov	Appendicitis	Appendectomy took place on 18 October.	1 month	4	
30 October 2015	10	MF	(Netherlands) Marc Klok	Ankle ligament injury	Occurred during match against Pirin Blagoevgrad.	1 week	3	
30 October 2015	18	MF	(Poland) Marcin Burkhardt	Ankle injury	Occurred during training.	1 week	5	
6 November 2015	13	MF	(Bulgaria) Simeon Raykov	Low back pain	Occurred during training.	Exact time unknown	1	
1 December 2015	23	DF	(Portugal) Ginho	Thigh injury	Occurred during match against Litex.	Exact time unknown	3	
6 December 2015	5	DF	(Bulgaria) Stefan Stanchev	Concussion	Occurred during match against Pirin Blagoevgrad.	Exact time unknown	2	
12 February 2016	5	DF	(Bulgaria) Stefan Stanchev	Ruptured ACL	Occurred during pre-season.	6 months	14	
12 February 2016	15	DF	(Bulgaria) Trayan Trayanov	Pulled hamstring	Occurred during pre-season.	2 weeks	5	
16 February 2016	9	FW	(Spain) Bacari	Pulled hamstring	Occurred during pre-season.	2 weeks	1	
27 March 2016	23	MF	(Bulgaria) Ivan Valchanov	Partially ruptured MCL	Occurred during friendly match against Solyaris Moscow.	Exact time unknown	4	
29 March 2016	7	MF	(Bulgaria) Bekir Rasim	Chickenpox	Occurred while on international duty.	2 weeks	1	
8 April 2016	28	MF	(Serbia) Ivan Marković	Knee injury	Occurred during training.	Exact time unknown	4	
5 May 2016	98	FW	(Bulgaria) Valentin Yoskov	Pulled hamstring	Occurred during training.	2 weeks	4	
5 May 2016	10	MF	(Netherlands) Marc Klok	Foodborne illness	Occurred before the match with Beroe.	1 week	1	

As of 22 May 2016

=== International call-ups ===
No.	Position	Name	Squad	Competition	Opposition	Date	Cap	Goals	Notes
—	DF	Stefan Ivanov	Bulgaria U19	Friendly	Italy U18	12 August 2015	Y	0	
—	MF	Emil Iliev	Bulgaria U19	Friendly	Italy U18	12 August 2015	Y	0	
—	MF	Nikolay Minkov	Bulgaria U19	Friendly	Italy U18	12 August 2015	Y	0	
33	GK	Georgi Kitanov	Bulgaria U21	UEFA Euro 2017 U21 Q	Romania U21	4 September 2015	Y	0	
33	GK	Georgi Kitanov	Bulgaria U21	UEFA Euro 2017 U21 Q	Luxembourg U21	8 September 2015	Y	0	
—	DF	Stefan Ivanov	Bulgaria U19	Friendly	Scotland U19	2 September 2015	Y	0	
—	DF	Stefan Ivanov	Bulgaria U19	Friendly	Scotland U19	4 September 2015			
—	MF	Emil Iliev	Bulgaria U19	Friendly	Scotland U19	2 September 2015			
—	MF	Emil Iliev	Bulgaria U19	Friendly	Scotland U19	4 September 2015			
8	MF	Sténio	Cape Verde	2017 ACN Q	Libya	6 September 2015	Y	0	
33	GK	Georgi Kitanov	Bulgaria U21	UEFA Euro 2017 U21 Q	Armenia U21	9 October 2015	Y	0	
33	GK	Georgi Kitanov	Bulgaria U21	UEFA Euro 2017 U21 Q	Denmark U21	13 October 2015	Y	0	
—	DF	Stefan Ivanov	Bulgaria U19	Friendly	Turkey U19	10 October 2015	Y	0	
—	DF	Stefan Ivanov	Bulgaria U19	UEFA Euro 2016 U19 Q	Poland U19	11 November 2015	Y	0	
—	DF	Stefan Ivanov	Bulgaria U19	UEFA Euro 2016 U19 Q	Luxembourg U19	13 November 2015	Y	0	
—	DF	Stefan Ivanov	Bulgaria U19	UEFA Euro 2016 U19 Q	Cyprus U19	16 November 2015	Y	0	
8	MF	Sténio	Cape Verde	2018 World Cup Q	Kenya	13 November 2015			
8	MF	Sténio	Cape Verde	2018 World Cup Q	Kenya	17 November 2015			
—	DF	Stefan Ivanov	Bulgaria U19	Friendly	(Georgia (country)) Georgia U19	24 January 2016	Y	0	
—	DF	Stefan Ivanov	Bulgaria U19	Friendly	(Georgia (country)) Georgia U19	26 January 2016			
33	GK	Georgi Kitanov	Bulgaria U21	UEFA Euro 2017 U21 Q	Wales U21	25 March 2016	Y	0	
33	GK	Georgi Kitanov	Bulgaria U21	UEFA Euro 2017 U21 Q	Luxembourg U21	29 March 2016	Y	0	
7	MF	Bekir Rasim	Bulgaria U21	UEFA Euro 2017 U21 Q	Wales U21	25 March 2016			
7	MF	Bekir Rasim	Bulgaria U21	UEFA Euro 2017 U21 Q	Luxembourg U21	29 March 2016			
8	MF	Sténio	Cape Verde	2017 ACN Q	Morocco	26 March 2016			
8	MF	Sténio	Cape Verde	2017 ACN Q	Morocco	29 March 2016	Y	0	
98	FW	Valentin Yoskov	Bulgaria U18	Friendly	(North Macedonia) Macedonia U18	12 April 2016	Y	0	
98	FW	Valentin Yoskov	Bulgaria U18	Friendly	(North Macedonia) Macedonia U18	14 April 2016			
33	GK	Georgi Kitanov	Bulgaria U21	Friendly	France U21	20 May 2016	Y	0	
33	GK	Georgi Kitanov	Bulgaria U21	Friendly	Czech Republic U21	22 May 2016	Y	0	
33	GK	Georgi Kitanov	Bulgaria U21	Friendly	Mexico U23	24 May 2016	Y	0	
33	GK	Georgi Kitanov	Bulgaria U21	Friendly	Mali U20	26 May 2016			
7	MF	Bekir Rasim	Bulgaria U21	Friendly	France U21	20 May 2016			
7	MF	Bekir Rasim	Bulgaria U21	Friendly	Czech Republic U21	22 May 2016			
7	MF	Bekir Rasim	Bulgaria U21	Friendly	Mexico U23	24 May 2016			
7	MF	Bekir Rasim	Bulgaria U21	Friendly	Mali U20	26 May 2016	Y	0	
9	FW	Bacari	Gambia	2017 ACN Q	South Africa	4 June 2016	Y	0	

=== Home attendances ===
Correct as of match played on 14 May 2016.
Win Draw Loss Void

Comp	Date	Score	Opponent	Attendance
Europa League	16 July 2015	1–1	(Belarus) Dinamo Minsk	3,650
A Group	26 July 2015	2–3	Ludogorets	3,360
A Group	8 August 2015	0–1	Levski	4,320
A Group	22 August 2015	1–0	Montana	1,500
A Group	11 September 2015	2–1	Lokomotiv Plovdiv	1,930
A Group	26 September 2015	1–0	Pirin Blagoevgrad	1,300
A Group	17 October 2015	1–0	Slavia	1,760
A Group	3 November 2015	0–3	Beroe	1,370
A Group	22 November 2015	1–2	Botev Plovdiv	1,060
A Group	1 December 2015	1–1	Litex	1,040
A Group	12 December 2015	0–2	Ludogorets	1,790
A Group	27 February 2016	0–2	Levski	3,700
A Group	6 March 2016	1–1	Montana	940
A Group	20 March 2016	1–1	Lokomotiv Plovdiv	760
A Group	9 April 2016	1–1	Pirin Blagoevgrad	780
A Group	23 April 2016	3–2	Slavia	840
A Group	6 May 2016	1–0	Beroe	580
A Group	14 May 2016	3–0	Botev Plovdiv	470
			**Total attendance**	**31,150**
			**Total league attendance**	**27,500**
			**Average attendance**	**1,731**
			**Average league attendance**	**1,618**

Source: Match reports in Competitions

== Club ==
=== Coaching staff ===
Position	Staff
Manager	(Bulgaria) Nikola Spasov
Assistant First Team Coach	(Bulgaria) Emanuil Lukanov
Goalkeeper Coach	(Bulgaria) Stoyan Stavrev
First Team Fitness Coach	(Bulgaria) Veselin Markov
Individual Team Fitness Coach	(Bulgaria) Viktor Bumbalov
Medical Director	(Bulgaria) Dr. Petko Atev
Academy Manager	(Bulgaria) Hristina Dimitrova

Last updated: 19 August 2014
Source: Cherno More

=== Other information ===
Owner/Chairman	(Bulgaria) Marin Mitev
Chief Executive	(Bulgaria) Marin Marinov
Sporting Director	(Bulgaria) Todor Velikov
Ground (capacity and dimensions)	Ticha Stadium (12,500 / 103x67 metres)

Updated to match played 1 August 2012
Source: Cherno More

== Notes ==
1. Cherno More play their home matches in the Europa League at Ludogorets Arena, Razgrad instead of their regular stadium, Ticha, Varna since the latter does not possess a UEFA license.
