= Valentin Yoskov =

Bulgarian footballer

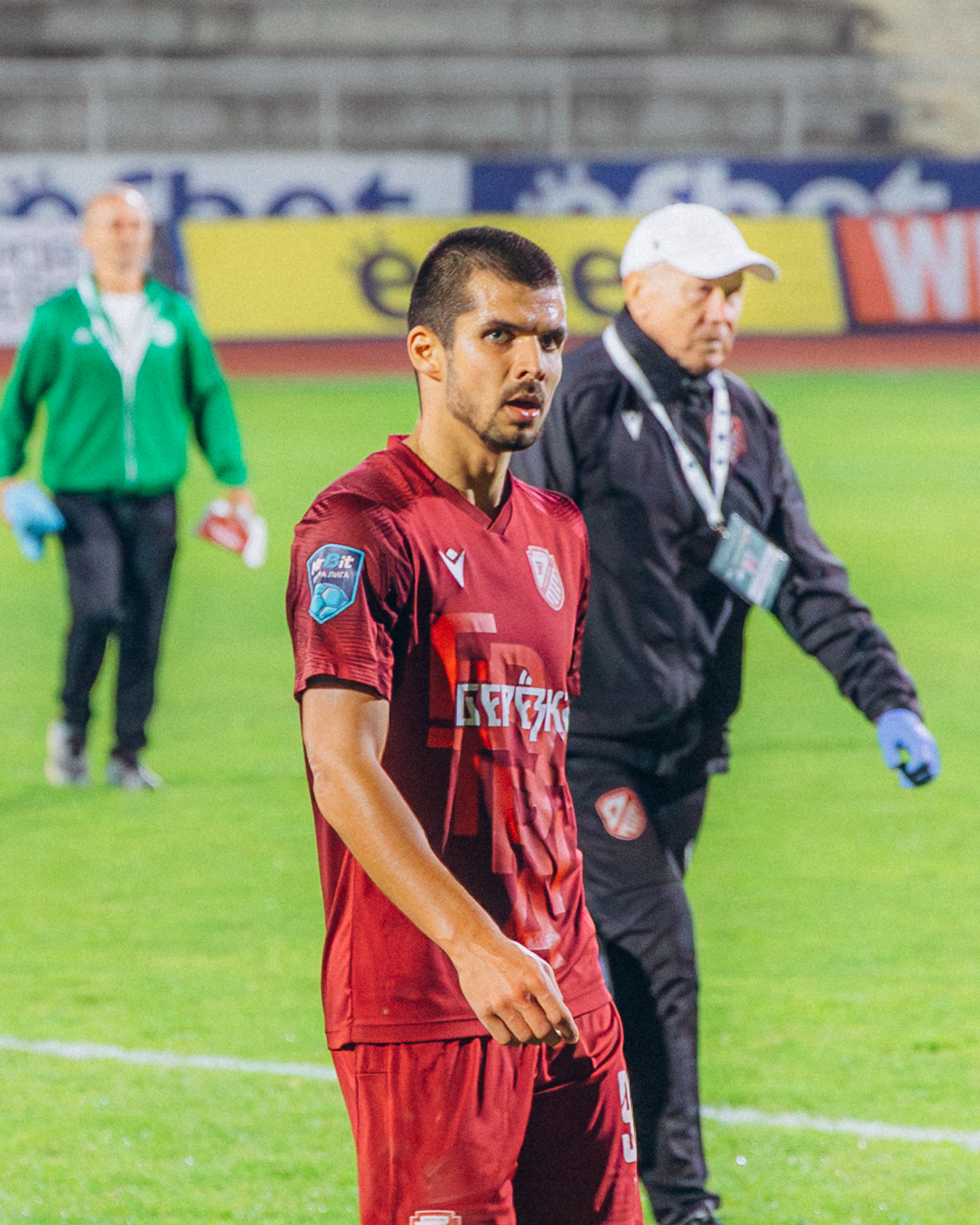
- Yoskov playing for Fratria in 2025.

Personal information
- Full name: Valentin Yoskov Yoskov
- Date of birth: 5 June 1998 (age 28)
- Place of birth: Burgas, Bulgaria
- Height: 1.78 m (5 ft 10 in)
- Position: Forward

Team information
- Current team: Chernomorets Burgas
- Number: 98

Youth career
- 2006–2011: Chernomorets Burgas
- 2011–2017: Cherno More

Senior career*
Years	Team	Apps	(Gls)
2015–2019	Cherno More	22	(0)
2017–2018	→ Nesebar (loan)	20	(5)
2018–2019	→ Chernomorets Balchik (loan)	25	(9)
2019–2024	CSKA 1948	36	(4)
2021–2024	CSKA 1948 II	51	(24)
2020–2021	→ Etar (loan)	7	(0)
2021	→ Sportist Svoge (loan)	14	(1)
2023	→ Septemvri Sofia (loan)	15	(2)
2024–2025	Pirin Blagoevgrad	37	(10)
2025–2026	Fratria	30	(5)
2026–	Chernomorets Burgas	10	(3)

International career
2015	Bulgaria U17	3	(0)
2016	Bulgaria U19	3	(0)
- * Club domestic league appearances and goals as of 07:25, 26 May 2026 (UTC)

Valentin Yoskov (Bulgarian: Валентин Йосков; born 5 June 1998) is a Bulgarian professional footballer who plays as a forward for Chernomorets Burgas.

== Career ==
Born in Burgas, Yoskov joined Cherno More's youth team at the age of 13, having arrived from Chernomorets Burgas. In the 2014–15 season, he scored 28 goals for the U-17 squad.

Yoskov made his senior debut for the club in a 1–0 league loss against Levski Sofia on 23 October 2015, playing the final seven minutes in place of Todor Palankov. Four days later, he scored his first goal in a 5–0 away win over Vihar Stroevo for the Bulgarian Cup.

On 17 June 2017, Yoskov was loaned to Second League club Nesebar. On 22 July, he made his debut for the club in a 2–3 away defeat by Tsarsko Selo, coming on as substitute for Stamen Angelov. He scored the last goal in the game. Yoskov returned to his parent club for pre-season training in preparations for the 2018–19 season.

== Statistics ==
As of 20 July 2018

Club performance			League		Cup		Continental		Other		Total	
Club	League	Season	Apps	Goals	Apps	Goals	Apps	Goals	Apps	Goals	Apps	Goals
Bulgaria			League		Bulgarian Cup		Europe		Other (Note: Includes Bulgarian Supercup matches.)		Total	
Cherno More	A Group	2015–16	5	0	1	1	0	0	–		6	1
Cherno More	First League	2016–17	16	0	1	1	0	0	–		17	1
Nesebar (loan)	Second League	2017–18	20	5	0	0	0	0	–		20	5
Cherno More	First League	2018–19	1	0	0	0	0	0	–		1	0
Career statistics			42	5	2	2	0	0	0	0	44	7
