= Ivan Marković (footballer, born 1994) =

Serbian footballer

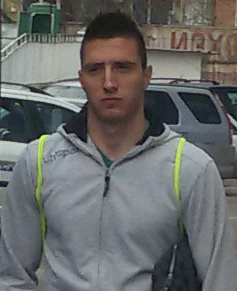

Personal information
- Date of birth: 20 June 1994 (age 32)
- Place of birth: Belgrade, FR Yugoslavia
- Height: 1.85 m (6 ft 1 in)
- Positions: Central midfielder; attacking midfielder

Team information
- Current team: Trayal Kruševac
- Number: 28

Youth career
- 2003–2008: Red Star Belgrade
- 2008–2011: Zemun
- 2011: VVV
- 2012: Partizan
- 2013: Korona Kielce

Senior career*
Years	Team	Apps	(Gls)
2010–2011	Zemun	1	(0)
2013–2014	Korona Kielce II	16	(5)
2014–2015	CSKA Sofia	12	(2)
2015	Levadiakos	4	(0)
2016	Cherno More	1	(0)
2016	Gyeongnam	2	(0)
2017	Voždovac	3	(2)
2017	Radnik Surdulica	5	(0)
2018	AFC Eskilstuna	8	(0)
2019	Kalamata	2	(1)
2019	Rabotnički	17	(5)
2020–2022	Zob Ahan	24	(6)
2022–2023	Iskra	15	(1)
2023	Jezero	8	(0)
2023–2024	Sham Shui Po	7	(1)
2024–	Trayal Kruševac	13	(2)
- * Club domestic league appearances and goals as of 29 November 2024

Ivan Marković (Serbian Cyrillic: Иван Марковић; born 20 June 1994) is a Serbian professional footballer who plays as a midfielder for Trayal Kruševac.

== Career ==
=== Early career ===
Born in Belgrade, Marković began playing football in the youth team of Red Star Belgrade before joining Zemun. He made his Zemun first team debut on 15 June 2011 at 16 years 360 days, in a 1–2 loss against Novi Pazar for Serbian First League, coming on as a substitute for Konstantin Stegnjajić at half-time.

After a short spell in the VVV-Venlo's youth academy, Marković joined Partizan in 2012. In January 2013, he left Partizan to join the Polish side Korona Kielce, but failed to make a single top-flight appearance in one year.

=== CSKA Sofia ===
On 22 February 2014, after a short trial period, Marković signed a two-and-a-half-year contract with CSKA Sofia. He made his debut in the Bulgarian A Group on 15 March in the Eternal derby of Bulgarian football against Levski Sofia, playing 57 minutes. On 21 April, in his second participation in the Eternal derby, he scored his first league goal for CSKA, netting the 3rd for a 3–1 win.

In pre-season training for the 2014–15 season, Marković ruptured his anterior cruciate ligament and received surgery on 22 July 2014. His recovery was said to take up to six months.

=== Cherno More Varna ===
On 28 January 2015, he signed for Cherno More coming from Levadiakos.

=== Sham Shui Po ===
On 8 October 2023, he signed for Sham Shui Po.

== Career statistics ==
=== Club ===
As of 20 March 2016

Club performance			League		Cup		Continental		Other		Total	
Club	League	Season	Apps	Goals	Apps	Goals	Apps	Goals	Apps	Goals	Apps	Goals
Zemun	2010–11	Prva liga	1	0	0	0	–		–		1	0
Zemun	Total		1	0	0	0	0	0	0	0	1	0
CSKA Sofia	2013–14	A Group	10	1	0	0	0	0	–		10	1
CSKA Sofia	2014–15	A Group	2	1	0	0	0	0	–		2	1
CSKA Sofia	Total		12	2	0	0	0	0	0	0	12	2
Levadiakos	2015–16	Super League Greece	4	0	2	1	–		–		6	1
Levadiakos	Total		4	0	2	1	0	0	0	0	6	1
Cherno More	2015–16	A Group	1	0	0	0	0	0	0	0	1	0
Cherno More	Total		1	0	0	0	0	0	0	0	1	0
Career Total			20	2	2	1	0	0	0	0	22	3

== Personal life ==
His twin brother, Vanja Marković, is also a professional footballer who plays for Sham Shui Po.
