= Ginho =

Portuguese footballer

Personal information
- Full name: Paulo Jorge Ruão da Silva Pinto Malheiro
- Date of birth: 8 June 1985 (age 41)
- Place of birth: Paredes, Portugal
- Height: 1.84 m (6 ft 0 in)
- Position: Centre back

Team information
- Current team: Paredes

Youth career
- 1999–2004: Porto

Senior career*
Years	Team	Apps	(Gls)
2004–2008	Paredes	56	(1)
2008–2009	Penafiel	30	(1)
2009–2010	Trofense	8	(0)
2010–2011	Penafiel	17	(0)
2011–2012	APOP	24	(0)
2012–2013	Ayia Napa	18	(0)
2013–2014	União Madeira	32	(0)
2014–2015	Desportivo de Aves	17	(1)
2015	Cherno More	9	(0)
2016–2017	CD Cinfães	16	(0)
2017–2018	Felgueiras 1932	9	(1)
2018	CD Cinfães	7	(0)
2018–	Paredes	21	(0)

International career
2001–2002	Portugal U17	5	(0)
2002–2003	Portugal U18	4	(0)
2003	Portugal U19	2	(0)
- * Club domestic league appearances and goals as of 25 March 2019

Paulo Jorge Ruão da Silva Pinto Malheiro (born 8 June 1985) commonly known as Ginho, is a Portuguese footballer who plays as a defender for Paredes.

== Club career ==
He started his career with Liga de Honra club Trofense. After 1 year he joined Penafiel. He made 17 appearances for the club before joining Ayia Napa.

== Club statistics ==
As of 1 December 2015

Club	Season	League			Cup		Other		Total	
Club	Season	Division	Apps	Goals	Apps	Goals	Apps	Goals	Apps	Goals
Paredes	2004–05	Segunda Divisão	9	0	0	0	—		9	0
Paredes	2005–06	Segunda Divisão	22	0	2	0	—		24	0
Paredes	2006–07	Segunda Divisão	25	1	2	0	—		27	1
Paredes	2007–08	Terceira Divisão	0	0	1	0	—		1	0
Paredes	Total		56	1	5	0	—		61	1
Penafiel	2008–09	Segunda Divisão	30	1	2	0	—		32	1
Trofense	2009–10	Segunda Liga	8	0	6	0	—		14	0
Penafiel	2010–11	Segunda Liga	17	0	4	0	—		21	0
APOP	2011–12	Cypriot Second Division	24	0	2	0	—		26	0
Ayia Napa	2012–13	Cypriot First Division	18	0	4	0	—		22	0
União	2013–14	Segunda Liga	32	0	4	0	—		36	0
Aves	2014–15	Segunda Liga	17	1	4	0	—		21	1
Cherno More	2015–16	A Group	9	0	2	0	1	0	12	0
Career total			211	3	33	0	1	0	245	3

== Honours ==
=== Club ===
Cherno More

- Bulgarian Supercup: 2015
