= Georgi Kitanov =

Bulgarian footballer

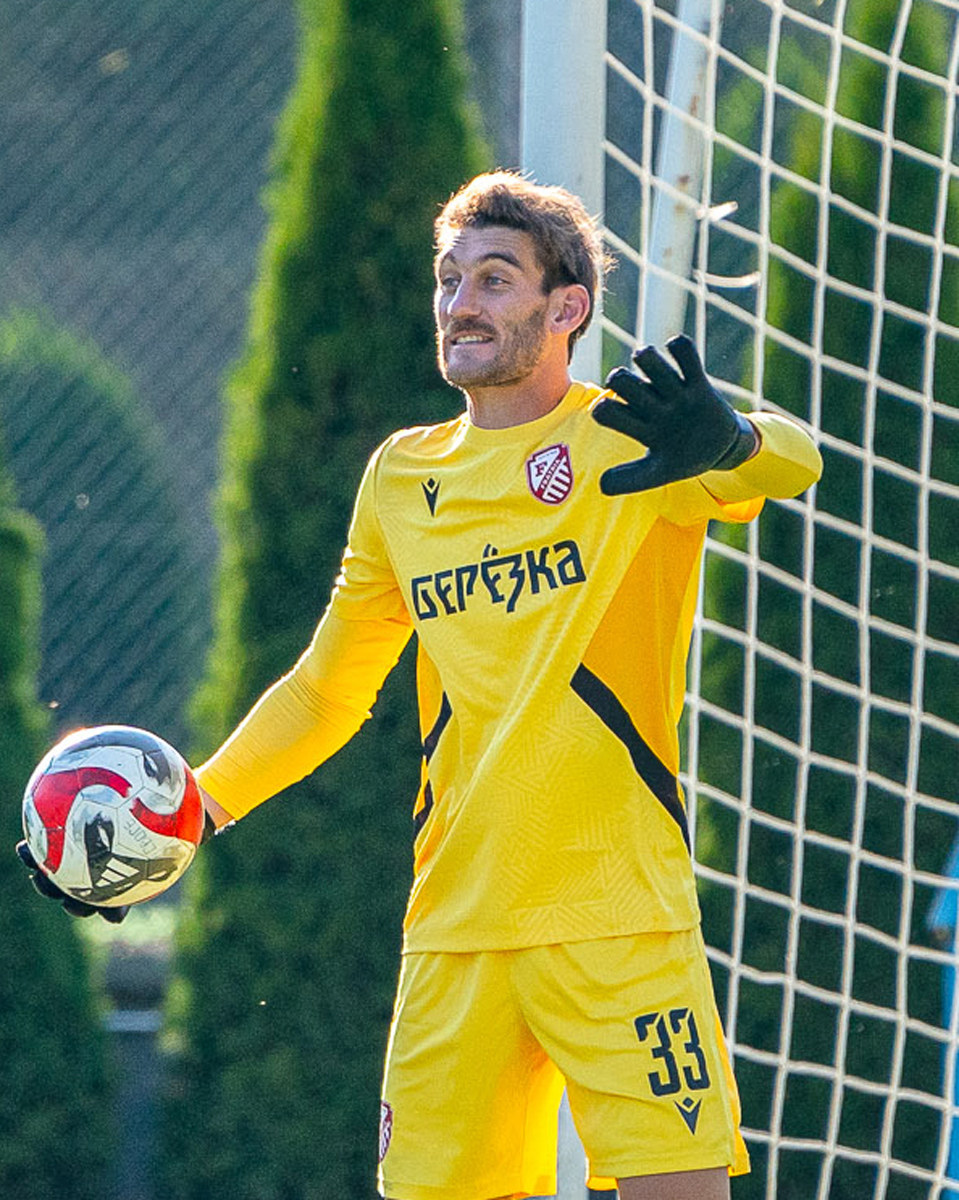
- Kitanov playing for Fratria in 2024.

Personal information
- Full name: Georgi Georgiev Kitanov
- Date of birth: 6 March 1995 (age 31)
- Place of birth: Blagoevgrad, Bulgaria
- Height: 1.88 m (6 ft 2 in)
- Position: Goalkeeper

Team information
- Current team: Dunav Ruse
- Number: 33

Youth career
- 2004–2012: Cherno More

Senior career*
Years	Team	Apps	(Gls)
2012–2016	Cherno More	110	(0)
2016–2019	CSKA Sofia	35	(0)
2018–2019	→ Cherno More (loan)	10	(0)
2019–2020	Astra Giurgiu	13	(0)
2020–2021	Petrolul Ploiești	11	(0)
2021–2024	Floriana	67	(0)
2024	Fratria	17	(0)
2025	Spartak Pleven	12	(0)
2025–	Dunav Ruse	30	(0)

International career
2011–2012	Bulgaria U17	6	(0)
2012–2013	Bulgaria U19	3	(0)
2012–2016	Bulgaria U21	18	(0)
- * Club domestic league appearances and goals as of 11:02, 13 May 2026 (UTC)

Georgi Georgiev Kitanov (Bulgarian: Георги Георгиев Китанов; born 6 March 1995) is a Bulgarian professional footballer who plays as a goalkeeper for Bulgarian First League club Dunav Ruse.

Kitanov has been with Cherno More since the age of 9, and stayed at the club until his move to CSKA Sofia in 2016. He has also represented Bulgaria at under-17, under-19 and under-21 level.

== Career ==
=== Cherno More ===
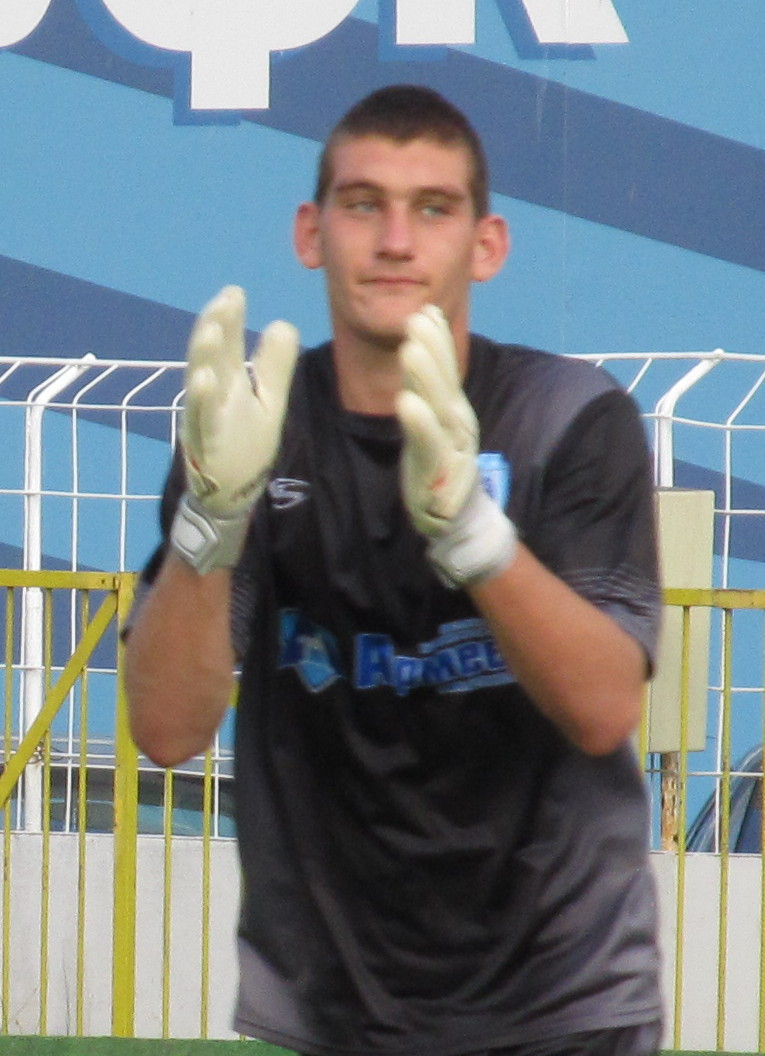
Kitanov with Cherno More in 2013.

Kitanov was born in Blagoevgrad, but grew up in Varna. He joined Cherno More Academy at the age of nine. In May 2012, he was promoted to the senior squad and given the number 33, for to replace the injured Petar Denchev. Kitanov made his first team debut in a 2–1 league win over Vidima-Rakovski on 14 May, coming on as a substitute for Plamen Kolev at the age of 17 years, 2 months and 8 days.

On 11 August 2012, he was handed his first league start, in a 3–0 home loss against Ludogorets Razgrad on the opening day of the 2012–13 season. A week later, Kitanov made his second start for Cherno More, keeping a clean sheet against Etar 1924 at Ivaylo Stadium. In January 2013, he spent a week on trial at Dutch club PSV Eindhoven.

On 19 October 2014, Kitanov kept a clean sheet in the 4–0 win over Beroe, but was seriously injured in the closing minutes of the match, suffering a broken foot after a challenge from a Beroe player. He underwent an operation and was expected to recover in four months' time at the earliest. Kitanov made his comeback for Cherno More from a serious injury on 26 May 2015, playing for 56 minutes of the 2–1 defeat against Lokomotiv Plovdiv.

On 3 March 2016 against Beroe, Kitanov made his 100th A Group appearance.

=== CSKA Sofia ===
On 2 June 2016 Kitanov moved to CSKA Sofia for 3 years. After quickly establishing himself as the first choice goalkeeper, Kitanov lost his status as the primary custodian shortly after the arrival of Lithuanian Vytautas Černiauskas. He was sent on loan at Cherno More on 3 September 2018 until the end of the season.

=== Astra Giurgiu ===
On 19 June 2019, Kitanov signed a 3-year contract with Romanian Liga I side Astra Giurgiu.

=== Fratria Varna ===
On 17 June 2024, Kitanov joined to the newly promoted to Bulgarian Second League team Fratria. He became a regular starter until November, when he got an injury. On 12 December 2024 it was announced he reached agreement to leave the club as few First league teams were interested in him.

=== Spartak Pleven ===
On 9 March 2025, Kitanov joined Bulgarian Second League side Spartak Pleven.

== International career ==
=== Under U21 ===
On 26 March 2016, Kitanov was in the starting lineup for the Bulgaria under-21s in a goalless draw with Wales.

On 21 May 2016, Kitanov was in the starting lineup during a 1–0 defeat from France.

=== Senior ===
In November 2016, Kitanov received his first call-up to the senior Bulgaria squad for a match against Belarus.

== Career statistics ==
=== Club ===
As of 30 August 2025

Appearances and goals by club, season and competition
Club	Season	League			National cup (Note: Includes Bulgarian Cup, Cupa României, Maltese FA Trophy)		Europe		Other		Total	
Club	Season	Division	Apps	Goals	Apps	Goals	Apps	Goals	Apps	Goals	Apps	Goals
Cherno More	2011–12	A Group	2	0	0	0	—		—		2	0
Cherno More	2012–13	A Group	28	0	1	0	—		–		29	0
Cherno More	2013–14	A Group	35	0	2	0	—		—		37	0
Cherno More	2014–15	A Group	12	0	0	0	—		—		12	0
Cherno More	2015–16	A Group	33	0	1	0	0	0	1 (Note: Appearance in Bulgarian Super Cup)	0	35	0
Cherno More	Total		110	0	4	0	0	0	1	0	115	0
CSKA Sofia	2016–17	First League	33	0	0	0	—		—		33	0
CSKA Sofia	2017–18	First League	2	0	1	0	—		—		3	0
CSKA Sofia	2018–19	First League	0	0	0	0	0	0	0	0	0	0
CSKA Sofia	Total		35	0	1	0	0	0	0	0	36	0
Cherno More (loan)	2018–19	First League	10	0	1	0	—		—		11	0
Astra Giurgiu	2019–20	Liga I	13	0	0	0	—		—		13	0
Petrolul Ploiești	2020–21	Liga II	11	0	2	0	—		—		13	0
Floriana	2021–22	Maltese Premier League	24	0	3	0	—		—		27	0
Floriana	2022–23	Maltese Premier League	19	0	1	0	2 (Note: Appearances in UEFA Europa Conference League)	0	1 (Note: Appearance in Maltese Super Cup)	0	23	0
Floriana	2023–24	Maltese Premier League	24	0	2	0	—		—		26	0
Floriana	Total		67	0	6	0	2	0	1	0	76	0
Fratria	2024–25	Second League	17	0	1	0	—		—		18	0
Spartak Pleven	2024–25	Second League	12	0	0	0	—		—		12	0
Dunav Ruse	2025–26	Second League	5	0	0	0	—		—		5	0
Career total			280	0	17	0	3	0	2	0	302	0

== Honours ==
Cherno More

- Bulgarian Cup: 2014–15
- Bulgarian Supercup: 2015
