= Trayan Trayanov =

Bulgarian footballer

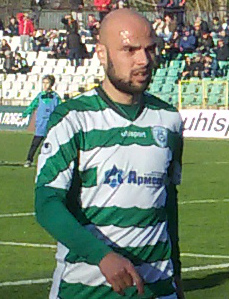

Personal information
- Full name: Trayan Dimitrov Trayanov
- Date of birth: 3 August 1987 (age 39)
- Place of birth: Vratsa, Bulgaria
- Height: 1.89 m (6 ft 2 in)
- Positions: Right back; centre back

Youth career
- Levski Sofia

Senior career*
Years	Team	Apps	(Gls)
2006–2009	Chavdar Byala Slatina	66	(2)
2009	Botev Krivodol	10	(1)
2010–2011	Vidima-Rakovski	39	(1)
2011	Botev Vratsa	1	(1)
2012	Slivnishki geroi	10	(0)
2012–2013	Svetkavitsa	21	(1)
2013	Neftochimic 1986	2	(0)
2013–2014	Chernomorets Burgas	27	(1)
2014–2015	Lokomotiv Sofia	18	(0)
2015–2017	Cherno More	34	(2)
2017	Septemvri Sofia	7	(0)
2018–2020	Chernomorets Balchik	28	(1)
- * Club domestic league appearances and goals

Trayan Trayanov (Bulgarian: Траян Траянов; born 3 August 1987) is a former Bulgarian professional footballer who played as a defender.

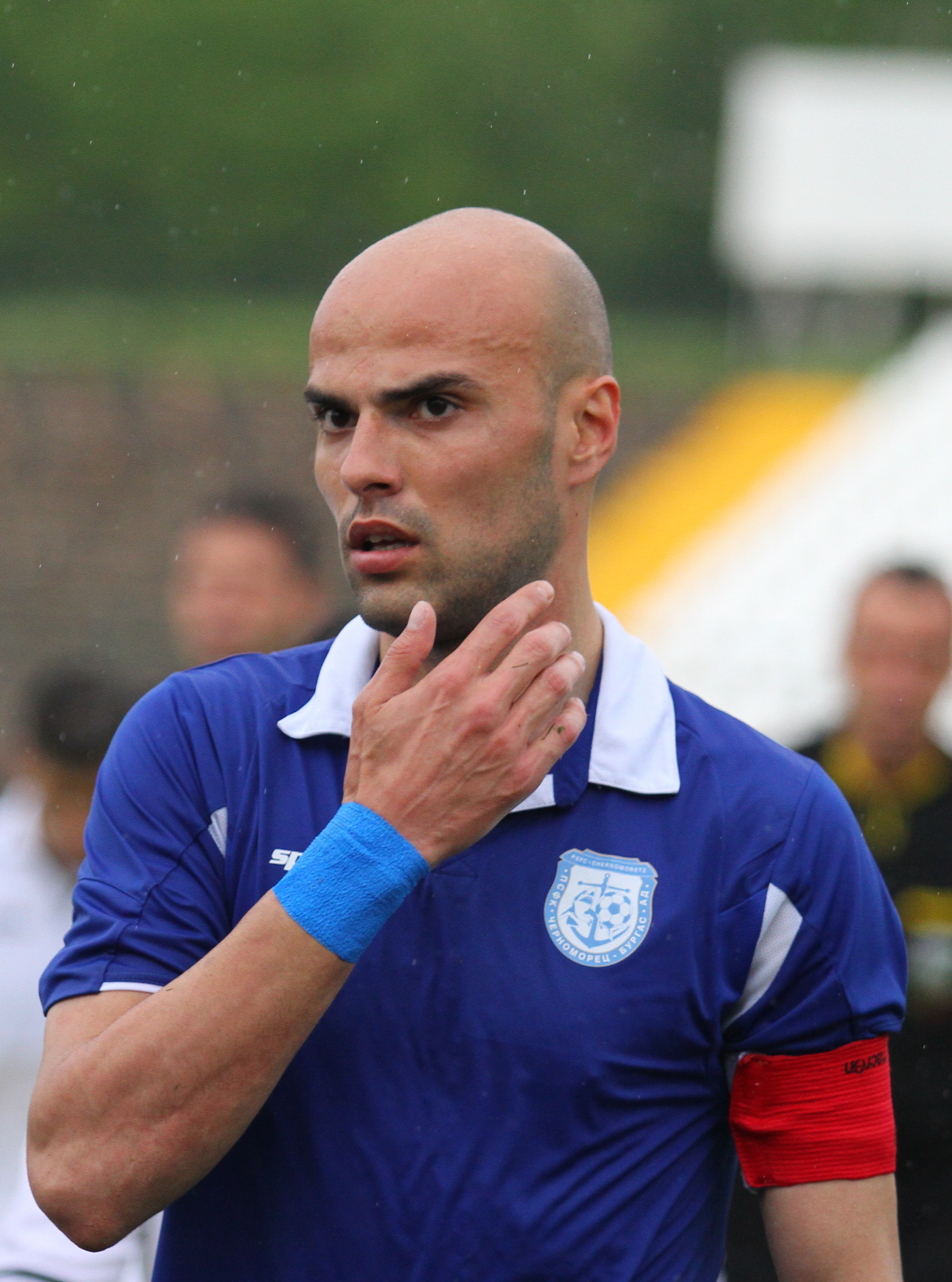
Trayanov with Chernomorets in 2013

== Career ==
=== Septemvri Sofia ===
On 14 June 2017, Trayanov joined Septemvri Sofia following his release from Cherno More. He made his debut for the team on 17 July 2017 in a match against Dunav Ruse where he was sent off in the 63rd minute.

He was released from the team on 21 December 2017.

== Honours ==
=== Club ===
Cherno More

- Bulgarian Supercup: 2015
