= Aleksandar Čanović =

Serbian footballer

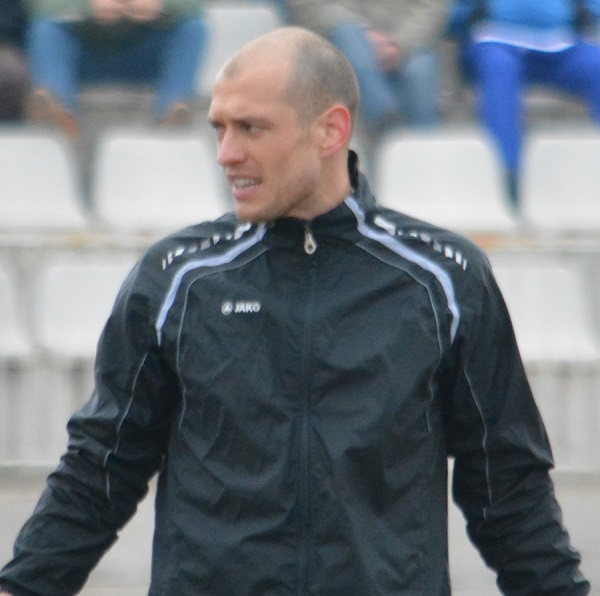
- Čanović in 2015

Personal information
- Full name: Aleksandar Čanović
- Date of birth: 18 February 1983 (age 43)
- Place of birth: Titova Mitrovica, SFR Yugoslavia
- Height: 1.87 m (6 ft 2 in)
- Position: Goalkeeper

Youth career
- Red Star Belgrade

Senior career*
Years	Team	Apps	(Gls)
2002–2003	Voždovac		
2003–2004	Pobeda		
2004–2005	Vojvodina	9	(0)
2005–2006	BASK	24	(0)
2006–2007	Voždovac	22	(0)
2007	Rad	12	(0)
2008	BSK Borča	16	(0)
2009	Dinamo Minsk	11	(0)
2010–2011	Ermis Aradippou	12	(0)
2011	Birkirkara	4	(0)
2012–2013	Bregalnica Štip	29	(0)
2013	BSK Borča	15	(0)
2014	Jedinstvo Užice	11	(0)
2015–2016	Cherno More Varna	16	(0)
2017–2018	Dinamo 1945	19	(0)
- * Club domestic league appearances and goals

Aleksandar Čanović (Serbian Cyrillic: Александар Чановић; born 18 February 1983) is a Serbian retired footballer who played as a goalkeeper.

== Club career ==
Čanović played for Voždovac (twice), Pobeda and Bregalnica Štip (in Macedonia), Vojvodina, BASK, Rad, BSK Borča (twice), Dinamo Minsk (in Belarus), Ermis Aradippou (in Cyprus), Birkirkara (in Malta), Jedinstvo Užice, and Cherno More Varna (in Bulgaria).

== International career ==
Čanović was named in the Serbia and Montenegro squad for the 2004 Summer Olympics. He served as a backup to Nikola Milojević, failing to make any appearances in the tournament.

== Honours ==
Pobeda

- Macedonian First Football League: 2003–04

Cherno More Varna

- Bulgarian Cup: 2014–15
- Bulgarian Supercup: 2015
