= Andreas Vasev =

Bulgarian footballer

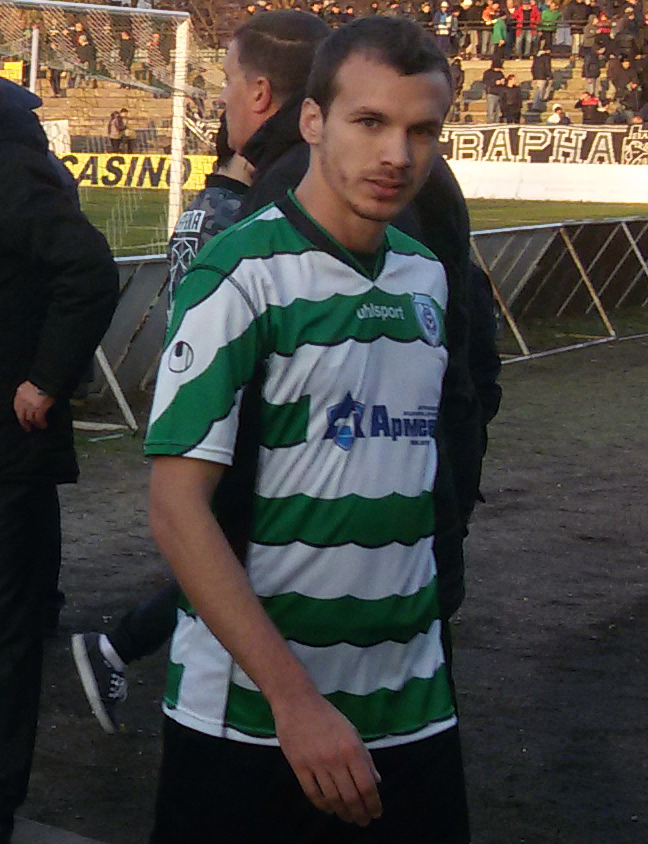

Personal information
- Full name: Andreas Yuriev Vasev
- Date of birth: 1 March 1991 (age 35)
- Place of birth: Bulgaria
- Height: 1.79 m (5 ft 10 in)
- Positions: Right back; winger

Youth career
- Levski Sofia

Senior career*
Years	Team	Apps	(Gls)
2010–2012	Sportist Svoge	32	(4)
2012	Septemvri Simitli	11	(1)
2013	Pirin Blagoevgrad	12	(3)
2013–2014	Minyor Pernik	25	(5)
2014–2015	Dunav Ruse	22	(9)
2015–2016	Cherno More	20	(0)
2016–2017	Montana	27	(2)
2017	Dunav Ruse	9	(0)
2018–2020	Botev Vratsa	69	(0)
2020–2022	Minyor Pernik	69	(1)
2023	Montana	15	(1)
Total		311	(26)
- * Club domestic league appearances and goals

Andreas Vasev (Bulgarian: Андреас Васев; born 1 March 1991) is a Bulgarian former professional footballer who played as a right back or winger.

== Career ==
=== Cherno More ===
On 30 June 2015 he signed with the Bulgarian Cup champion Cherno More Varna from Dunav Ruse. Vasev debuted for the team on 12 August 2015 in the Bulgarian Supercup match against PFC Ludogorets Razgrad which was won by Cherno More, thus becoming Superchampions of Bulgaria. He made his professional debut for the team in the A Group on 19 July 2015 in the match against Pirin Blagoevgrad.

=== Dunav Ruse ===
On 15 June 2017, Vasev returned to Dunav Ruse.

== Career statistics ==
=== Club ===
As of 22 May 2016

Club performance			League		Cup		Continental		Other		Total	
Club	League	Season	Apps	Goals	Apps	Goals	Apps	Goals	Apps	Goals	Apps	Goals
Bulgaria			League		Bulgarian Cup		Europe		Other (Note: Includes Bulgarian Supercup matches.)		Total	
Sportist Svoge	B Group	2010–11	17	4	1	0	–		–		18	4
Sportist Svoge	B Group	2011–12	15	0	0	0	–		–		15	0
Sportist Svoge	Total		32	4	1	0	0	0	0	0	33	4
Septemvri Simitli	B Group	2012–13	11	1	0	0	–		–		11	1
Pirin Blagoevgrad	V Group	2012–13	12	3	0	0	–		–		12	3
Minyor Pernik	V Group	2013–14	25	5	0	0	–		–		25	5
Dunav Ruse	V Group	2014–15	22	9	3	1	–		–		25	10
Cherno More	A Group	2015–16	20	0	3	0	2	0	1	0	26	0
Cherno More	Total		20	0	3	0	2	0	1	0	26	0
Career statistics			122	22	7	0	2	0	1	0	132	22

== Honours ==
=== Club ===
Cherno More

- Bulgarian Supercup: 2015
