= Villyan Bijev =

Bulgarian professional footballer

Villyan Bijev Вилиян Бижев
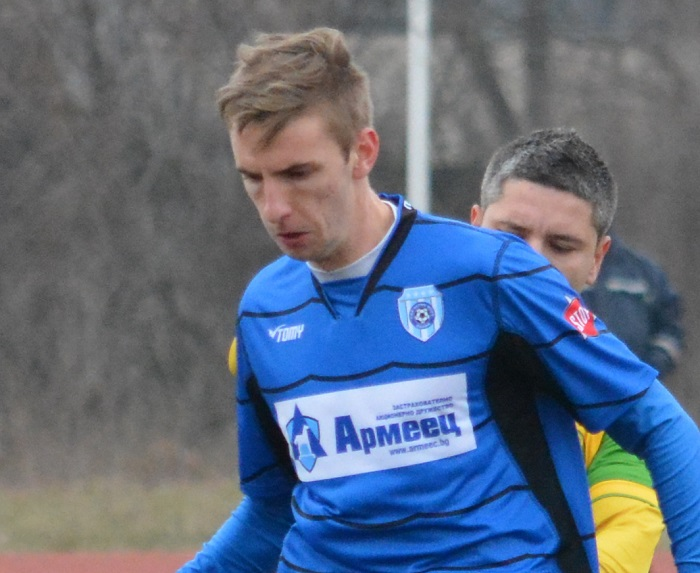
- Bijev with Cherno More in 2015

Personal information
- Date of birth: 3 January 1993 (age 33)
- Place of birth: Sofia, Bulgaria
- Height: 1.83 m (6 ft 0 in)
- Positions: Midfielder; forward

Youth career
- 2008–2011: California Odyssey
- 2011–2014: Liverpool

Senior career*
Years	Team	Apps	(Gls)
2011–2014	Liverpool	0	(0)
2011–2012	→ Fortuna Düsseldorf II (loan)	16	(4)
2011–2012	→ Fortuna Düsseldorf (loan)	1	(0)
2012	→ Start (loan)	1	(0)
2014	Slavia Sofia	10	(1)
2015	Cherno More	23	(3)
2016–2017	Portland Timbers 2	52	(16)
2017	→ Sacramento Republic (loan)	11	(2)
2018–2020	Sacramento Republic	74	(11)
2021	Oklahoma City Energy	31	(12)
2022–2023	Central Valley Fuego	46	(7)
Total		265	(56)

International career^{‡}
2010–2011	United States U18	3	(0)
2012	United States U20	3	(0)
2013–2015	Bulgaria U21	4	(0)
- * Club domestic league appearances and goals as of 14 October 2023 ‡ National team caps and goals as of 19 November 2013

Villyan Bijev (Bulgarian: Вилиян Бижев, born 3 January 1993) is a Bulgarian retired footballer who played as a midfielder.

== Early life ==
Villyan Bijev was born in Sofia, Bulgaria, and moved with his family to the United States at the age of five in 1998. He grew up in Fresno, California and began his youth career with the Bullard Flyers U-12 local school team. In 2008, at the age of 15, Bijev joined the Clovis-based California Odyssey. He also played for the Edison High School team in Fresno, graduating in 2011. He was named to the 2010 Parade All-America soccer team.

== Career ==
=== Liverpool ===
Bijev originally signed to play college soccer at the University of Washington in the fall of 2011, but in July 2011, Liverpool invited Bijev for a trial with the Under 18s. He left a great impression, netting five goals in two pre-season friendly games, earning himself a permanent switch to the Merseyside outfit in the process on a reported three-year deal with an additional two-year option. Liverpool officially announced the signing from US outfit California Odyssey on 31 August 2011.

He was released from the club at the end of the 2013–14 season.

==== Loan spells ====
The same day he signed for Liverpool, it was announced that Bijev had signed on loan for German side Fortuna Düsseldorf for the 2011–12 season. Bijev played mostly for Fortuna B-squad, where he scored 4 goals in 16 games. He appeared once for the first team, playing the last 8 minutes of a 2–1 away loss against Hansa Rostock on 5 April 2012, in the place of Adam Matuszczyk.

On 27 August 2012, Bijev joined Norwegian First Division side IK Start on a one-year loan, as this will help him gain the necessary work permits to play in England. Bijev made his debut for the club in a 2–1 win over Hødd. Though he made one appearance, the club would be promoted to Tippeligaen.

=== Slavia Sofia ===
After being released by Liverpool, Bijev joined Bulgarian A Football Group side Slavia Sofia. He made his league debut for the club in a 4–1 home win against Marek Dupnitsa on 19 July 2014. Bijev marked his debut with a goal, scoring the fourth. In December 2014, his contract with Slavia was terminated by mutual consent.

=== Cherno More ===
On 12 January 2015, Bijev signed with Cherno More Varna on a one-and-a-half-year deal. He made his debut on 27 February, starting in a 2–0 home league win against Slavia Sofia. Bijev scored his first official goal for Cherno More on 5 March, netting the fourth in a 5–0 success at Lokomotiv Gorna Oryahovitsa for the Bulgarian Cup.

=== Return to the US ===
Bijev returned to the United States in 2016, playing for USL Championship sides Portland Timbers 2 and Sacramento Republic FC. In March 2021, Bijev joined Oklahoma City Energy FC. After OKC Energy announced a year-long hiatus, Bijev made a return to his hometown of Fresno by signing with USL League One expansion club Central Valley Fuego FC. On 8 June 2022, Bijev was named USL League One Player of the Month for May, in recognition of his three goals and one assist which led Central Valley to their first ever unbeaten month.

On 2 January 2024 he announced his retirement from playing at the age of 30.

== International career ==
Born in Bulgaria but raised in the United States and holding American citizenship, Bijev is eligible for both nations. He has represented the United States at the under-18 and under-20 level and Bulgaria at the under-21 level. He has yet to represent either at the senior level.

== Career statistics ==
As of 31 December 2018

Club performance			League		Cup		Continental		Total	
Club	Season	League	Apps	Goals	Apps	Goals	Apps	Goals	Apps	Goals
Liverpool	2011–12	Premier League	0	0	0	0	0	0	0	0
Fortuna Düsseldorf II (loan)	2011–12	Regionalliga	16	4	0	0	–		16	4
Fortuna Düsseldorf (loan)	2011–12	2. Bundesliga	1	0	0	0	–		1	0
IK Start (loan)	2012	First Division	1	0	0	0	–		1	0
Liverpool	2012–13	Premier League	0	0	0	0	0	0	0	0
Liverpool	2013–14	Premier League	0	0	0	0	–		0	0
Liverpool	Total		0	0	0	0	0	0	0	0
Slavia Sofia	2014–15	A Group	10	1	1	0	–		11	1
Cherno More	2014–15	A Group	11	2	4	2	–		15	4
Cherno More	2015–16	A Group	12	1	1	3	2	0	15	4
Cherno More	Total		23	3	5	5	2	0	30	8
Portland Timbers 2	2016	United Soccer League	29	10	–		–		29	10
Portland Timbers 2	2017	United Soccer League	23	7	–		–		23	7
Sacramento Republic	2017	United Soccer League	9	2	–		–		9	2
Sacramento Republic	2018	United Soccer League	32	6	2	2	–		32	8
	Total		61	15	0	0	0	0	93	23
Portland Timbers	2017	Major League Soccer	0	0	1	0	–		1	0
Career statistics			94	21	7	5	2	0	106	26

== Honors ==
Cherno More

- Bulgarian Cup: 2014–15
- Bulgarian Supercup: 2015
