= Mamoutou Coulibaly =

Malian footballer (born 1984)

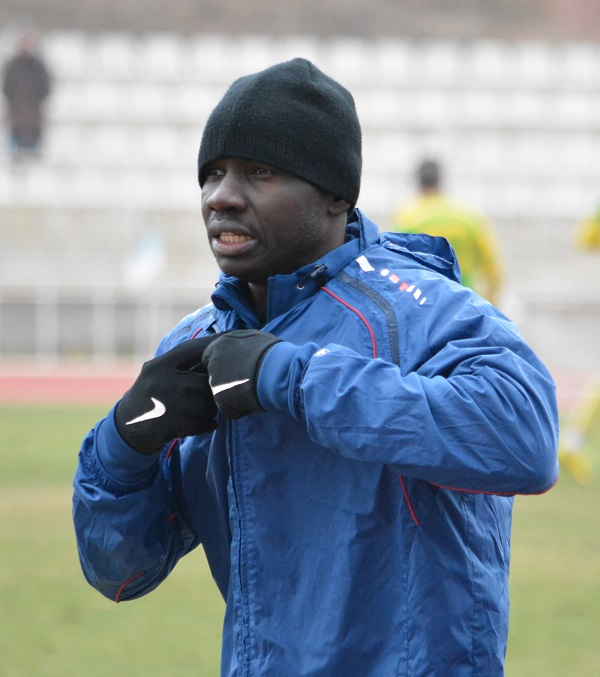
- Coulibaly in 2015

Personal information
- Date of birth: 23 February 1984 (age 42)
- Place of birth: Bamako, Mali
- Height: 1.83 m (6 ft 0 in)
- Position: Centre back

Senior career*
Years	Team	Apps	(Gls)
2002–2003	Centre Salif Keita		
2003–2006	Auxerre	1	(0)
2003–2006	Auxerre B	60	(3)
2006–2007	Istres	22	(1)
2007	Kasımpaşa	6	(0)
2008	FC Brussels	0	(0)
2009–2010	Cherno More	29	(0)
2010–2013	Irtysh Pavlodar	64	(4)
2014	Kaisar	30	(1)
2015–2016	Cherno More	30	(1)
2017	Kyzylzhar	23	(2)

International career
2003	Mali U-20		
2005–2006	Mali	2	(0)
- * Club domestic league appearances and goals

Mamoutou Coulibaly (born 23 February 1984) is a Malian former professional footballer who played as a centre back. Coulibaly won two caps for the Mali national team between 2005 and 2006.

== Club career ==
=== Early career ===
Born in Bamako, Mali, Coulibaly began his career at Centre Salif Keita before earning a move to French club AJ Auxerre in 2003. In three years at Auxerre Coulibaly made two appearances for the first team, once in the domestic league and once in the UEFA Cup, and in 2006 he was sold to Ligue 2 team FC Istres.

Coulibaly became a regular for Istres and in June 2007, after spending one year at the club, it was announced that he would leave the team and join Turkish side Kasımpaşa S.K.

In 2008 Coulibaly was part of the Belgian side FC Brussels.

=== Cherno More ===
In January 2009 Coulibaly was invited by Bulgarian side Cherno More Varna to join a trial period, which began on 29 January. He made his team debut a few days later, in a 4–0 friendly win against the Bulgaria U19. On 20 February, Cherno More signed Coulibaly on a two-a-half-year deal. He made his competitive debut for Cherno More on 8 March 2009 against Pirin in the round of 16 of the A PFG. Until the end of the 2009–10 season he played 35 matches for the club.

=== Irtysh Pavlodar ===
In November 2010, Coulibaly signed a contract with Kazakhstan Premier League side FC Irtysh. The Malian made his official debut for the team (as a starter) on 6 March 2011, in the 1–0 away win over FC Taraz in a Kazakhstan Premier League match. On 30 April 2011, Coulibaly scored his first goal for the club in the 3–2 home win against FC Tobol in a league game.

=== Kaisar ===
In February 2014, Coulibaly moved from Irtysh to fellow Kazakh Premier League side FC Kaisar.

=== Cherno More Return ===
On 3 February 2015, Coulibaly returned to Cherno More.

=== Kyzylzhar ===
In early 2017, Coulibaly returned to Kazakhstan, signing for FC Kyzylzhar.

== International career ==
Coulibaly played for the Mali under-20 side and captained the team at the 2003 FIFA U-20 World Cup in the United Arab Emirates, where he played two matches. He also played four matches at 2001 FIFA U-17 World Cup in Argentina.

== Honours ==
Cherno More

- Bulgarian Cup: 2014–15
- Bulgarian Supercup: 2015
