= 2015 Bulgarian Supercup =

Финал за Суперкупата на България 2015
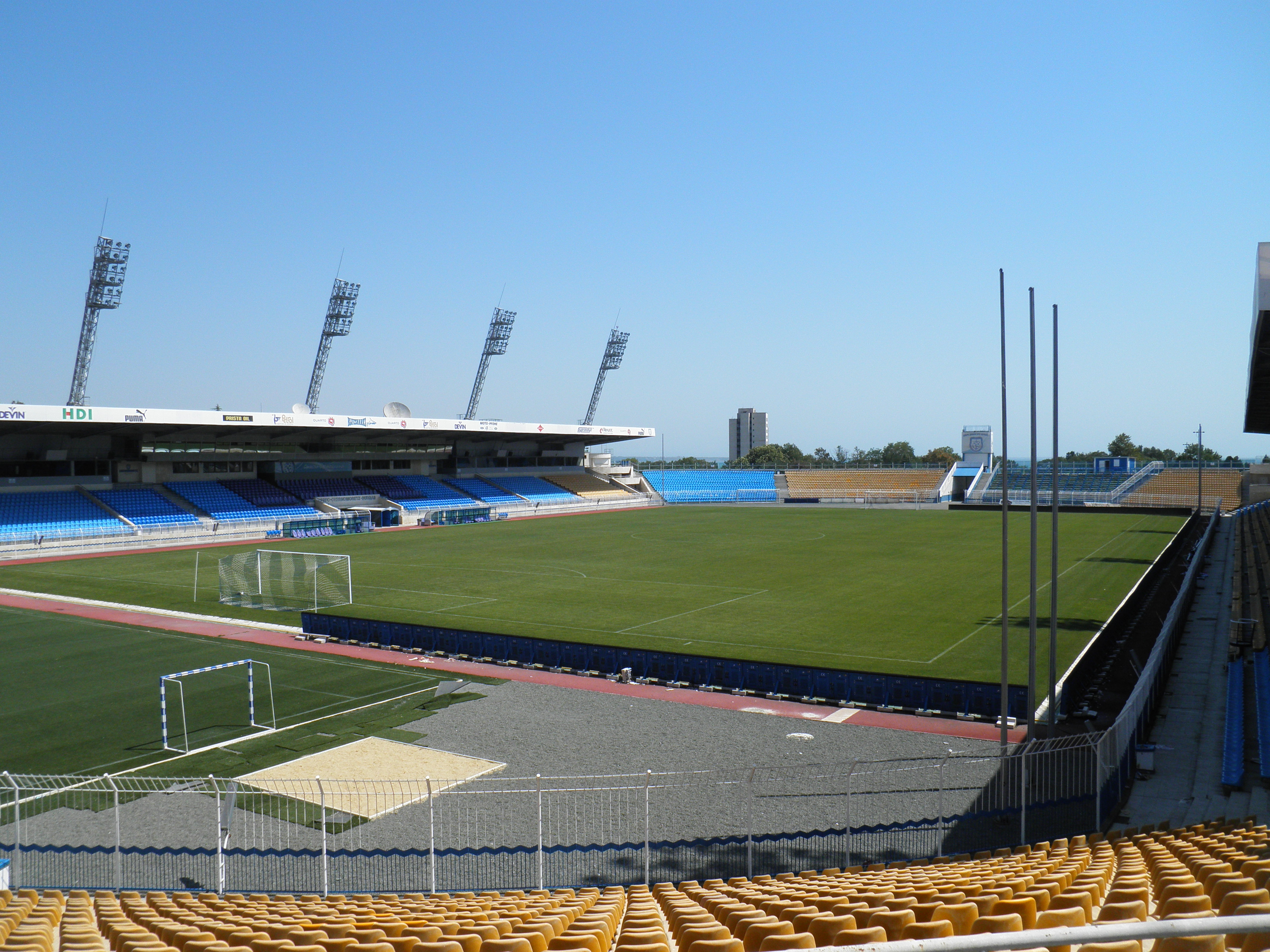
Ludogorets	Cherno More
A Group	Bulgarian Cup
0	1
- Date: 12 August 2015
- Venue: Lazur, Burgas
- Referee: Stanislav Todorov (Shumen)
- Attendance: 3,600

The 2015 Bulgarian Supercup was the 13th Bulgarian Supercup, an annual Bulgarian football match played between the winners of the previous season's A Football Group and Bulgarian Cup. The game was played between Cherno More Varna, who beat Levski Sofia to win the 2015 Bulgarian Cup Final, and Ludogorets Razgrad, champions of the 2014–15 A Group.

This was Ludogorets's fourth Bulgarian Supercup appearance and Cherno More's first. Watched by a crowd of 3,600 at Lazur Stadium in Burgas, Cherno More won the match 1–0.

== Match details ==
12 August 2015
20:00 EEST

Ludogorets Razgrad	0–1	Cherno More
		Bourabia 15'

Lazur, Burgas
Attendance: 3,600
Referee: Stanislav Todorov

Ludogorets	Cherno More

GK	21	(Bulgaria) Vladislav Stoyanov
RB	8	(Brazil) Lucas Sasha	(yellow card) 45+3'
CB	55	(Bulgaria) Georgi Terziev
CB	27	(Romania) Cosmin Moți
LB	6	(Brazil) Natanael
CM	18	(Bulgaria) Svetoslav Dyakov (c)	(yellow card) 28'	(substituted off) 60'
CM	30	(Romania) Andrei Prepeliță
RM	88	(Brazil) Wanderson
AM	84	(Brazil) Marcelinho	(yellow card) 64'
LM	93	(Netherlands) Virgil Misidjan		(substituted off) 60'
FW	11	(Brazil) Juninho Quixadá	(yellow card) 40'	(substituted off) 78'
Substitutes:
GK	1	(Canada) Milan Borjan
DF	15	(Bulgaria) Aleksandar Aleksandrov
DF	83	(Bulgaria) Hristo Popadiyn
MF	7	(Bulgaria) Mihail Aleksandrov
MF	12	(Madagascar) Anicet Abel		(substituted in) 60'
MF	22	(Brazil) Jonathan Cafu		(substituted in) 60'
MF	92	(Netherlands) Jody Lukoki		(substituted in) 78'
Manager:
(Portugal) Bruno Ribeiro

GK	33	(Bulgaria) Georgi Kitanov
RB	5	(Bulgaria) Stefan Stanchev	(yellow card) 58'
DF	15	(Bulgaria) Trayan Trayanov		(substituted off) 26'
DF	6	(Mali) Mamoutou Coulibaly	(yellow card) 42'
LB	4	(Bulgaria) Mihail Venkov (c)
CM	10	(Netherlands) Marc Klok	(yellow card) 54'	(substituted off) 77'
CM	8	(Cape Verde) Sténio
RM	77	(Bulgaria) Andreas Vasev		(substituted off) 79'
AM	21	(France) Mehdi Bourabia	(yellow card) 66'
LM	19	(Martinique) Mathias Coureur	(yellow card) 51'
FW	11	(Bulgaria) Zhivko Petkov
Substitutes:
GK	40	(Serbia) Aleksandar Čanović
DF	23	(Portugal) Ginho		(substituted in) 26'
MF	3	(Bulgaria) Daniel Georgiev		(substituted in) 77'
MF	13	(Bulgaria) Simeon Raykov
MF	18	(Poland) Marcin Burkhardt
MF	84	(Bulgaria) Todor Palankov	(yellow card) 90+3'	(substituted in) 79'
FW	20	(Bulgaria) Villyan Bijev
Manager:
(Bulgaria) Nikola Spasov

Man of the Match:

MATCH OFFICIALS

- Assistant referees:
  - Ivo Kolev
  - Georgi Todorov
- Fourth official:
  - Nikola Popov

Match rules

- 90 minutes.
- Penalty shoot-out if scores level.
- Seven named substitutes, of which up to three may be used.
