= Vladislav Romanov =

Bulgarian footballer

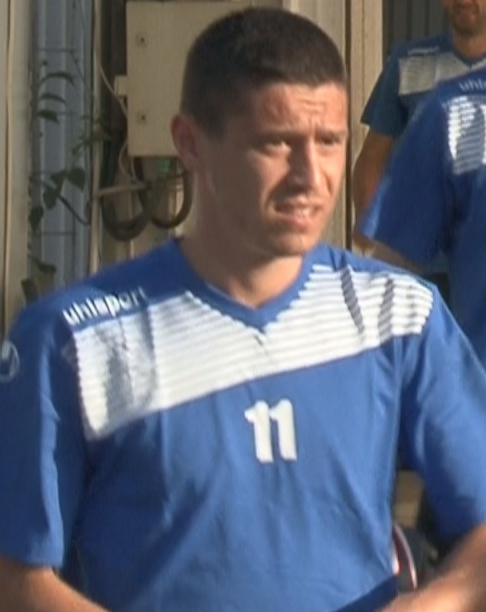

Personal information
- Full name: Vladislav Dimitrov Romanov
- Date of birth: 7 February 1988 (age 38)
- Place of birth: Sofia, Bulgaria
- Height: 1.74 m (5 ft 9 in)
- Position: Winger

Youth career
- 1995–2007: CSKA Sofia

Senior career*
Years	Team	Apps	(Gls)
2008	Lokomotiv Mezdra	0	(0)
2009–2010	Botev Vratsa	26	(2)
2010–2011	Lokomotiv Sofia	36	(3)
2012	Slavia Sofia	10	(1)
2012	Botev Vratsa	10	(0)
2013	Cracovia	3	(0)
2013	Lyubimets 2007	2	(0)
2014	Botev Vratsa	12	(1)
2014–2015	Lokomotiv Sofia	32	(6)
2015	Trikala	0	(0)
2016	Cherno More	19	(0)
2017	Neftochimic Burgas	13	(2)
2017	Septemvri Sofia	14	(0)
2018–2019	Lokomotiv Sofia	37	(3)
- * Club domestic league appearances and goals

Vladislav Romanov (Bulgarian: Владислав Романов; born 7 February 1988) is a Bulgarian former professional footballer who played as a winger.

== Career ==
Romanov is a product of CSKA Sofia's Academy having joined the club at the age of 7. He was a part of the side that won the 2007 Bulgarian Under-19 Championship, beating Levski Sofia on penalties in the final. Romanov scored the final penalty to give CSKA the victory.

In January 2008, after a short trial period, Romanov joined Lokomotiv Mezdra. On 12 November 2008, he made his professional debut in a Bulgarian Cup match against Balkan Botevgrad, replacing Rui Miguel at half time.

In July 2009, Romanov signed with newly promoted B Group side Botev Vratsa.

On 9 June 2010, Romanov signed with Lokomotiv Sofia on a four-year deal. He made his A Group debut in a 1–0 away win over Montana on 1 August. Romanov scored his first goal two weeks later, netting the fourth in a 4–0 home win against Kaliakra Kavarna.

On 10 January 2017, Romanov signed with Neftochimic Burgas. He left the club after 6 months, following the relegation to Second League.

On 14 June 2017, Romanov joined Septemvri Sofia. He made his debut for the team on 17 July 2017 in match against Dunav Ruse. He was released from the team on 21 December 2017.

== Career statistics ==
As of 14 December 2016

Club statistics
Season	Club	League	League		Cup		Continental		Total	
Season	Club	League	App	Goals	App	Goals	App	Goals	App	Goals
2008–09	Lokomotiv Mezdra	A Group	0	0	1	0	–		1	0
2009–10	Botev Vratsa	B Group	26	2	4	2	–		30	4
2010–11	Lokomotiv Sofia	A Group	24	2	1	0	–		25	2
2011–12	Lokomotiv Sofia	A Group	12	1	0	0	3	0	15	1
2011–12	Slavia Sofia	A Group	10	1	0	0	–		10	1
2012–13	Botev Vratsa	A Group	10	0	2	0	–		12	0
2012–13	Cracovia	I liga	3	0	0	0	–		3	0
2013–14	Lyubimets 2007	A Group	2	0	1	0	–		3	0
2013–14	Botev Vratsa	B Group	12	1	0	0	–		12	1
2014–15	Lokomotiv Sofia	A Group	32	6	5	0	–		37	6
2015–16	Cherno More	A Group	13	0	–		–		13	0
2016–17	Cherno More	First Professional League	6	0	1	0	–		7	0
Career Total			150	13	15	2	3	0	168	15
