= Simeon Raykov =

Bulgarian footballer

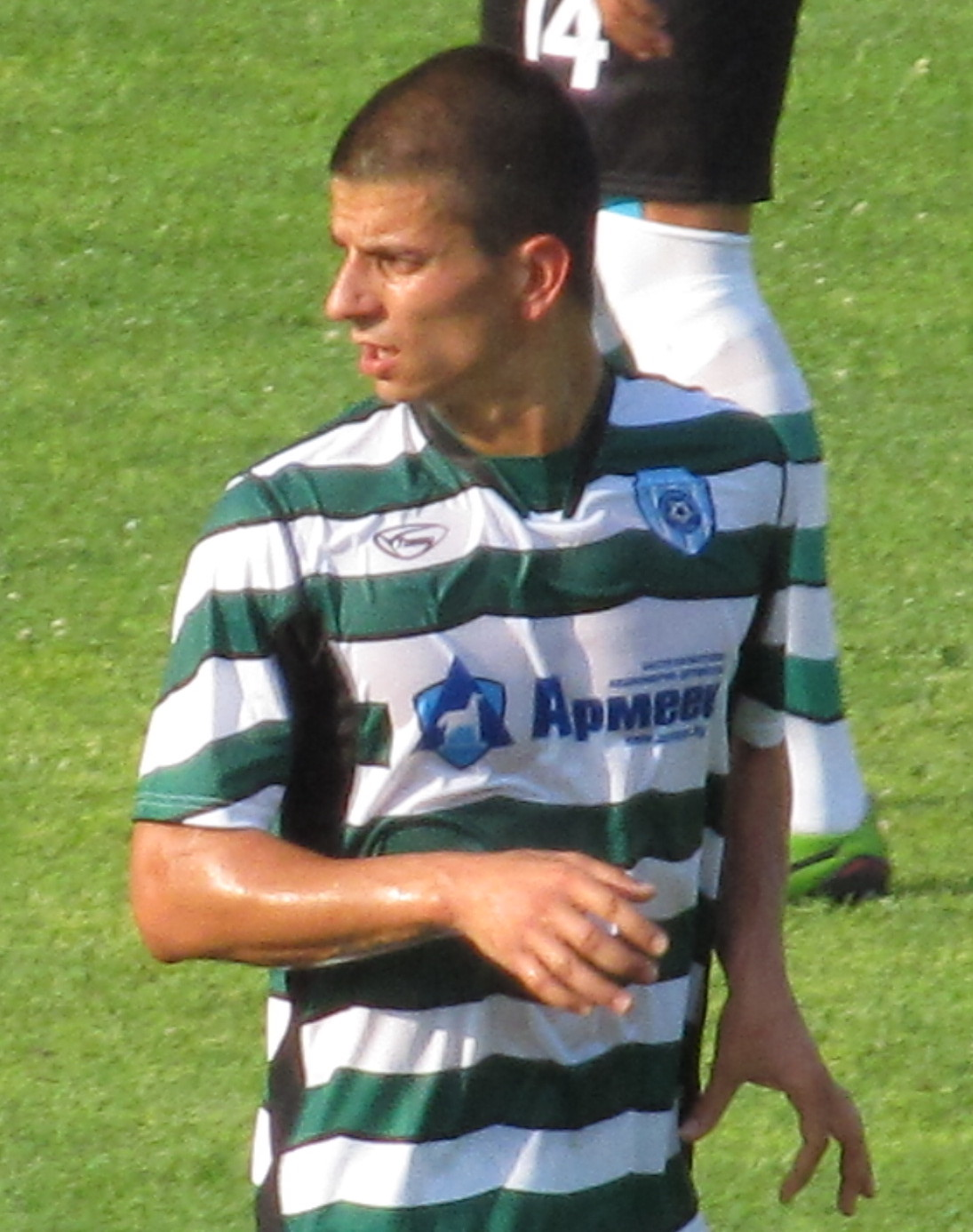

Personal information
- Full name: Simeon Georgiev Raykov
- Date of birth: 11 November 1989 (age 37)
- Place of birth: Plovdiv, Bulgaria
- Height: 1.75 m (5 ft 9 in)
- Position: Winger

Senior career*
Years	Team	Apps	(Gls)
2007–2008	Spartak Plovdiv	3	(0)
2008–2009	Sliven	5	(0)
2009–2010	Spartak Plovdiv	6	(0)
2010–2011	Botev Vratsa	28	(11)
2011–2012	Levski Sofia	29	(7)
2013	Cherno More	35	(8)
2014	Chernomorets Burgas	12	(5)
2014–2016	Cherno More	48	(10)
2016	Lokomotiv Plovdiv	9	(1)
2017	Roda JC Kerkrade	2	(0)
2017–2019	Lokomotiv Plovdiv	28	(4)
2019–2020	Gigant Saedinenie	0	(0)
Total		205	(46)
- * Club domestic league appearances and goals

Simeon Raykov (Bulgarian: Симеон Райков; born 11 November 1989) is a Bulgarian former professional footballer who played as a winger.

== Career ==
=== Levski Sofia ===
In the summer of 2011, Simeon signed with PFC Levski Sofia. His kit number was chosen to be 11. On 19 July 2012, Raykov netted the only goal for Levski in the 1:0 home win over Bosnian club FK Sarajevo in a UEFA Europa League match, but the team from Sofia was eliminated from the competition after a 1:3 loss in the return leg.

On 19 August 2012, he scored 2 goals in the derby match against Botev Plovdiv and as a result of that he was chosen for Player of the Second Round in A PFG in a poll of the newspaper "Football".

On 31 January 2017, it was announced that Simeon had joined Dutch football club Roda JC Kerkrade. His contract was terminated in June.

On 7 August 2017, Raykov signed a two-year contract with Lokomotiv Plovdiv.

== Snooker ==
Raykov is a keen snooker player and won the Bulgarian Snooker Championship in 2007. After the completion of his football career, Raykov entered snooker tournaments once again.

== Career statistics ==
As of 8 December 2016

Appearances and goals by club, season and competition
Club	Season	League		Cup		Europe		Total	
Club	Season	Apps	Goals	Apps	Goals	Apps	Goals	Apps	Goals
Spartak Plovdiv	2007–08	3	0	0	0	–		3	0
Sliven 2000	2008–09	5	0	0	0	–		5	0
Spartak Plovdiv	2009–10	6	0	0	0	–		6	0
Botev Vratsa	2010–11	28	11	0	0	–		28	11
Levski Sofia	2011–12	19	4	0	0	2	0	21	4
Levski Sofia	2012–13	10	3	2	0	2	1	14	4
Total		29	7	2	0	4	1	35	8
Cherno More	2012–13	14	2	0	0	–		14	2
Cherno More	2013–14	21	6	3	0	–		24	6
Total		35	8	3	0	–		38	8
Chernomorets Burgas	2013–14	12	5	2	0	–		14	5
Cherno More	2014–15	23	6	5	1	–		28	7
Cherno More	2015–16	25	4	3	4	2	0	30	8
Lokomotiv Plovdiv	2016–17	9	1	2	2	–		11	3
Career total		175	42	17	7	6	1	198	50

== Honours ==
=== Club ===
Cherno More

- Bulgarian Cup: 2014–15
- Bulgarian Supercup: 2015
