= Stefan Stanchev =

Bulgarian footballer

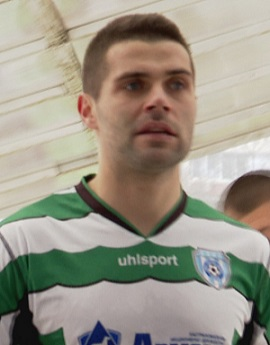

Personal information
- Full name: Stefan Nikolaev Stanchev
- Date of birth: 26 April 1989 (age 37)
- Place of birth: Smolyan, Bulgaria
- Height: 1.79 m (5 ft 10 1/2 in)
- Positions: Right-back; centre-back

Team information
- Current team: Rodopa Smolyan
- Number: 5

Youth career
- Levski Sofia

Senior career*
Years	Team	Apps	(Gls)
2008–2012	Levski Sofia	19	(0)
2009	→ Pirin Blagoevgrad (loan)	10	(0)
2012	Botev Plovdiv	8	(0)
2013	Minyor Pernik	14	(0)
2013–2021	Cherno More	151	(2)
2021–	Rodopa Smolyan	0	(0)
- * Club domestic league appearances and goals as of 20 September 2020

Stefan Stanchev (Bulgarian: Стефан Станчев; born 26 April 1989) is a Bulgarian professional footballer who plays as a defender for Rodopa Smolyan.

== Career ==
=== Levski Sofia ===
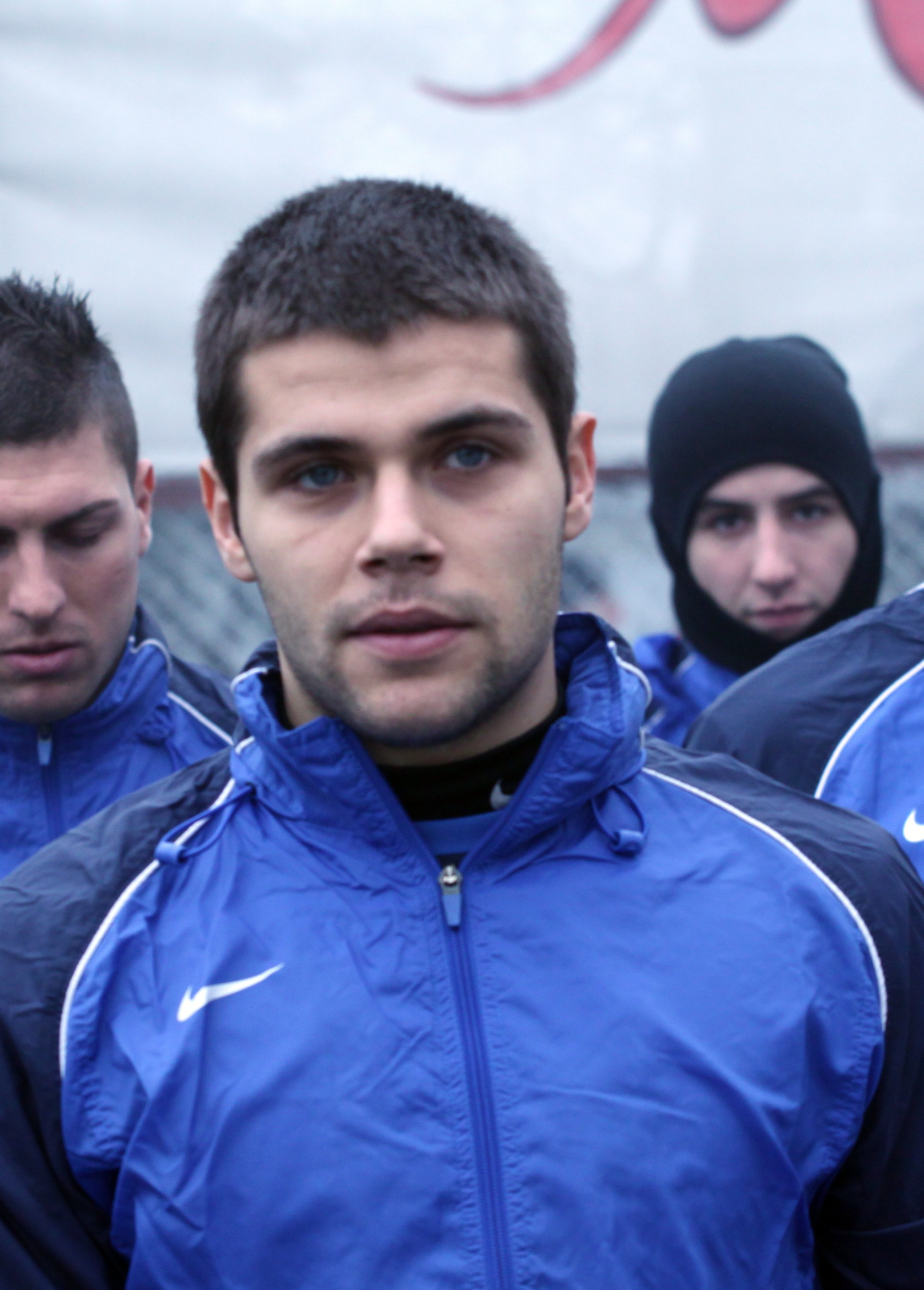
Stanchev with Levski in 2011

Stanchev comes directly from Levski Sofia's youth academy. After the establishment of the second team of Levski, he became a part of the new-formed PFC Levski Sofia B. During the first season of the Doubles League, Levski became a champion.

Stanchev made his official debut for Levski's senior team on the 13 June 2009 in a match against Pirin Blagoevgrad. The result of the match was 1-1.

On 7 January 2010, Stanchev started training with Levski again. On 20 March 2010, he was in the starting line-up for Levski and played the full 90 minutes, earning praise for his performance in the 3–0 home win against Slavia Sofia. On 27 March 2010, he played in his first Eternal Derby against CSKA Sofia, but was withdrawn in the 39th minute after sustaining an injury.

==== Pirin loan ====
On 2 August 2009, Stanchev was loaned out for one year to Pirin Blagoevgrad together with his team-mate Ivan Tsachev. However, after half a season, Stanchev returned to Levski. For Pirin, he made 10 appearances, playing in the A PFG.

=== Botev Plovdiv ===
On 28 June 2012, he signed a contract with Botev Plovdiv for 1 years plus an option for a year's extension. His first appearance in an official match came on 11 August 2012, in the 3–0 home win over Slavia Sofia. Stanchev had difficulties securing a starting spot for himself. In January he was released.

=== Cherno More Varna ===
On 5 June 2013, Stanchev signed with Cherno More Varna.

== Career stats ==
As of 15 December 2018

Club	Season	League		Cup		Europe		Total	
Club	Season	Apps	Goals	Apps	Goals	Apps	Goals	Apps	Goals
Levski Sofia	2008–09	1	0	0	0	0	0	1	0
Pirin Blagoevgrad	2009–10	10	0	0	0	–		10	0
Levski Sofia	2009–10	6	0	0	0	0	0	6	0
Levski Sofia	2010–11	7	0	1	0	2	0	10	0
Levski Sofia	2011–12	5	0	0	0	0	0	5	0
Botev Plovdiv	2012–13	8	0	2	0	–		10	0
Minyor Pernik	2012–13	14	0	0	0	–		14	0
Cherno More	2013–14	25	0	1	0	–		26	0
Cherno More	2014–15	15	0	5	0	–		20	0
Cherno More	2015–16	13	0	1	0	2	0	16	0
Cherno More	2016–17	25	1	3	0	–		28	1
Cherno More	2017–18	23	0	1	0	–		24	0
Cherno More	2018–19	6	0	0	0	–		6	0
Career totals		158	1	14	0	4	0	176	1

== Honours ==
=== Club ===
Levski Sofia

- Bulgarian A Group: 2008–09

Cherno More

- Bulgarian Cup: 2014–15
- Bulgarian Supercup: 2015
