= Todor Palankov =

Bulgarian footballer (born 1984)

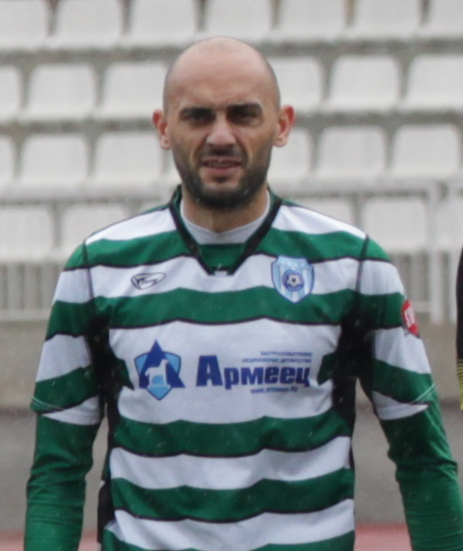

Personal information
- Full name: Todor Borisov Palankov
- Date of birth: 13 January 1984 (age 42)
- Place of birth: Eleshnitsa, Bulgaria
- Height: 1.83 m (6 ft 0 in)
- Position: Defensive midfielder

Team information
- Current team: Bansko
- Number: 13

Youth career
- Litex Lovech

Senior career*
| Years | Team | Apps | (Gls) |
| 2003–2007 | Litex Lovech | 37 | (1) |
| 2003 | → Belite orli (loan) | 15 | (0) |
| 2005 | → Vidima-Rakovski (loan) | 16 | (1) |
| 2007 | → Cherno More (loan) | 12 | (0) |
| 2007–2010 | Pirin Blagoevgrad | 81 | (3) |
| 2010–2013 | Chernomorets Burgas | 72 | (4) |
| 2013–2017 | Cherno More | 107 | (3) |
| 2017–2018 | Pirin Blagoevgrad | 17 | (0) |
| 2018 | Chernomorets Balchik | 15 | (1) |
| 2019 | Dobrudzha Dobrich | 12 | (0) |
| 2021–2022 | Pirin Razlog | 46 | (2) |
| 2023– | Bansko | 0 | (0) |
- * Club domestic league appearances and goals as of 29 March 2023

Todor Palankov (Bulgarian: Тодор Паланков; born 13 January 1984) is a Bulgarian footballer who plays as a defensive midfielder for Pirin Razlog.

== Career ==
Palankov began his career at Litex Lovech where he made 37 A PFG appearances. He made his debut on 13 March 2004 in a 1–0 home win over Pirin Blagoevgrad and scored his only goal for Litex against Rilski Sportist on 13 August 2006. Whilst at Litex he spent time out on loan at Belite orli, Vidima-Rakovski and Cherno More before joining Pirin Blagoevgrad on a permanent basis in the summer of 2007.

In December 2009, Palankov confirmed he will sign a pre-contractual agreement for Chernomorets Burgas. On 12 January 2010, he signed a three-year contract, joining the team at the start of the 2010–11 season. He made his debut on 21 August 2010, coming on as a second-half substitute in a 1–0 home win over Vidima-Rakovski. Palankov left Chernomorets at the end of the 2012–13 season, when his contract expired.

On 5 June 2013, Palankov joined Cherno More Varna as a free agent. He made his second Cherno More debut on 19 July, as a substitute against his previously club Chernomorets Burgas, on the opening day of 2013–14 season. On 7 December, Palankov scored a last-minute winning goal for the 2–1 victory over Neftochimic Burgas. On 29 May 2017, his contract was terminated by mutual consent.

In June 2017, Palankov joined Pirin Blagoevgrad. In June 2018, he moved to Chernomorets Balchik.

He has received call-ups to the Bulgaria U21 team.

== Honours ==
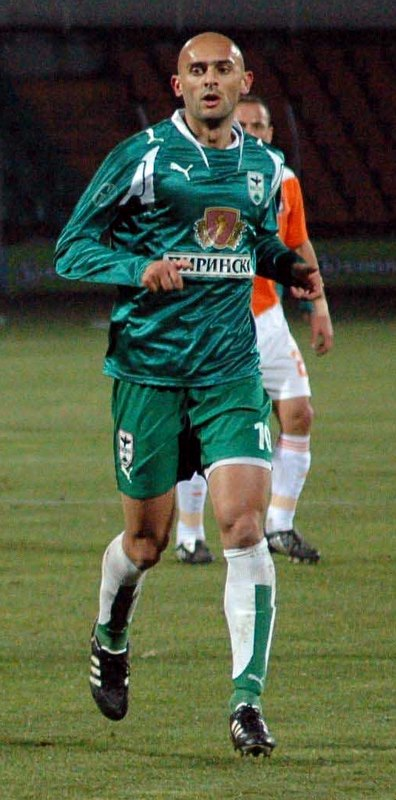
Palankov playing for Pirin in 2009

=== Club ===
Litex Lovech

- Bulgarian Cup: 2003–04

Cherno More

- Bulgarian Cup: 2014–15
- Bulgarian Supercup: 2015
