= 2014–15 PFC Cherno More Varna season =

Cherno More
2014–15 season
- Chairman: Marin Mitev
- Manager: Aleksandar Stankov (until 18 August 2014); Nikola Spasov (from 19 August 2014)
- A PFG: 8th
- Bulgarian Cup: Winners
- Top goalscorer: League: Ivan Kokonov (7); All: Mathias Coureur (9)
- Highest home attendance: 4,710 (vs Levski, 9 May 2015)
- Lowest home attendance: 220 (vs Lokomotiv Plovdiv, 26 May 2015)
- Average home league attendance: 1,712
- Biggest win: 5–0 (vs Lokomotiv Gorna Oryahovitsa, 5 March 2015)
- Biggest defeat: 2–5 (vs Levski, 3 April 2015)
- All statistics correct as of 31 May 2015.

This page covers all relevant details regarding PFC Cherno More Varna for all official competitions inside the 2014–15 season. These are A PFG and Bulgarian Cup.

== Transfers ==
=== In ===
Date	Pos.	Name	From	Fee
15 June 2014	GK	(Bulgaria) Kiril Akalski	Lokomotiv Plovdiv	Free
16 June 2014	MF	(Martinique) Mathias Coureur	(Spain) Huracán Valencia	Free
18 June 2014	FW	(Bulgaria) Zhivko Petkov	Neftochimic	Free
23 June 2014	MF	(Bulgaria) Simeon Raykov	Chernomorets Burgas	Free
27 June 2014	GK	(Bulgaria) Iliya Nikolov	Rakovski	Free
1 July 2014	MF	(Cape Verde) Sténio	(Portugal) Feirense	Free
17 July 2014	FW	(Bulgaria) Miroslav Manolov	Litex	Free
1 September 2014	GK	(Bulgaria) Ilko Pirgov	Litex	Free
8 September 2014	MF	(Poland) Marcin Burkhardt	(Poland) Miedź Legnica	Free
13 October 2014	MF	(Netherlands) Marc Klok	(Scotland) Ross County	Free
21 December 2014	MF	(Bulgaria) Petar Zlatinov	Litex	Free
29 December 2014	GK	(Serbia) Aleksandar Čanović	Free agent	Free
12 January 2015	FW	(Bulgaria) Villyan Bijev	Slavia	Free
3 February 2015	DF	(Mali) Mamoutou Coulibaly	(Kazakhstan) Kaisar	Free
19 February 2015	DF	(Bulgaria) Toni Stoichkov	CSKA	Free

=== Out ===
Date	Pos.	Name	To	Fee
9 May 2014	MF	(Brazil) Edenilson Bergonsi	CSKA	Free
19 May 2014	FW	(Bulgaria) Valeri Domovchiyski	Levski Sofia	Free
28 May 2014	GK	(Bulgaria) Nik Dashev	Free agent	Released
16 July 2014	MF	(Bulgaria) Petko Tsankov	Kaliakra	Free
17 July 2014	FW	(Bulgaria) Atanas Iliev	Dobrudzha	Free
2 August 2014	GK	(Bulgaria) Kiril Akalski	Rakovski	Free
15 December 2014	DF	(Bulgaria) Sasho Aleksandrov	Levski Sofia	Free
15 December 2014	MF	(Bulgaria) Dimo Atanasov	Marek	Free
22 December 2014	FW	(Bulgaria) Miroslav Manolov	(Romania) Târgu Mureș	Free
22 December 2014	GK	(Bulgaria) Ilko Pirgov	Beroe	Free
8 January 2015	GK	(Bulgaria) Hristiyan Hristov	Free agent	Released

=== Loans in ===
Date	Pos.	Name	From	End date	Fee
23 February 2015	MF	(Colombia) Sebastián Hernández	Ludogorets Razgrad	End of season	Free

== Squad information ==
N	Pos.	Nat.	Name	Age	EU	Since	App	Goals	Ends	Transfer fee	Previous Club	Notes
1	GK	(Bulgaria)	Iliya Nikolov	28	EU	2014	5	0	2015	Free	Rakovski	
3	CM	(Bulgaria)	Daniel Georgiev	32	EU	2013	148	15	2015	Free	Lokomotiv Plovdiv	(Note: Georgiev made 101 appearances and scored 12 goals during his first spell at the club between 2007 and 2011.)
4	LB	(Bulgaria)	Mihail Venkov (y)	31	EU	2013	63	0	2015	Free	CSKA	
4	DM	(Bulgaria)	Aleksandar Yovchev	18	EU	2014	1	0		Youth system	Cherno More Academy	(Note: Kostadinov and Yovchev wore shirt No.28 in their solitary Bulgarian Cup appearance. Stoichkov was initially assigned No.28 but actually used No.31.)
5	RB	(Bulgaria)	Stefan Stanchev	26	EU	2013	40	0	2015	Free	Minyor Pernik	
6	CB	(Bulgaria)	Kiril Kotev (captain)	33	EU	2013	60	3	2015	Free	Lokomotiv Plovdiv	
7	AM	(Bulgaria)	Bekir Rasim	20	EU	2012	35	0	2016	Youth system	Cherno More Academy	
7	RB	(Bulgaria)	Martin Kostadinov	19	EU	2014	3	0		Youth system	Cherno More Academy	
8	DM	(Cape Verde)	Sténio	27	EU	2014	28	5	2016	Free	(Portugal) Feirense	
8	CM	(Bulgaria)	Aleksandar Popov	18	EU	2014	3	0		Youth system	Cherno More Academy	
9	FW	(Spain)	Bacari	27	EU	2013	47	12	2015	Free	(Spain) L'Hospitalet	
10	CM	(Netherlands)	Marc Klok	22	EU	2014	13	0	2016	Free	(Scotland) Ross County	
10	AM	(Bulgaria)	Nikolay Minkov	17	EU	2014	1	0		Youth system	Cherno More Academy	
11	FW	(Bulgaria)	Zhivko Petkov	22	EU	2014	18	2	2016	Free	Neftochimic	
11	RW	(Bulgaria)	Iliyan Nedelchev	19	EU	2015	1	0		Youth system	Spartak Varna	
12	GK	(Bulgaria)	~~Hristiyan Hristov~~	19	EU	2013	1	0		Youth system	Cherno More Academy	(Note: Player left the club in January 2015.)
13	LW	(Bulgaria)	Simeon Raykov	25	EU	2014	58	14	2016	Free	Chernomorets Burgas	(Note: Raykov made 35 appearances and scored 8 goals during his first spell at the club in 2013.)
14	FW	(Bulgaria)	Georgi Bozhilov	28	EU	2010	139	19	2015	€100,000	Chernomorets Burgas	
15	CM	(Bulgaria)	~~Petar Zlatinov~~	34	EU	2015	16	2	2015	Free	Litex	(Note: Zlatinov made 11 appearances during his first spell at the club in 2001.) (Note: Player left the club in May 2015.)
17	LW	(Bulgaria)	Ivan Kokonov	23	EU	2013	57	8	2015	Free	Slavia	
18	CM	(Poland)	Marcin Burkhardt	31	EU	2014	19	3	2015	Free	(Poland) Miedź Legnica	
19	RW	(Martinique)	Mathias Coureur	27	EU	2014	21	5	2016	Free	(Spain) Huracán Valencia	
20	FW	(Bulgaria)	Villyan Bijev	22	EU	2015	11	2	2017	Free	Slavia	
21	DM	(Bulgaria)	Emil Iliev	18	EU	2015	1	0		Youth system	Cherno More Academy	
22	AM	(Colombia)	Sebastián Hernández	28	Non-EU	2015	11	3	2015	Free	Ludogorets Razgrad (loan)	
22	AM	(Armenia)	Karen Madoyan	19	EU	2015	1	0		Youth system	Cherno More Academy	
23	GK	(Bulgaria)	~~Kiril Akalski~~	28	EU	2014	0	0	2016	Free	Rakovski	(Note: Player left the club in August 2014.)
23	CB	(Mali)	Mamoutou Coulibaly	31	Non-EU	2015	39	0	2016	Free	(Kazakhstan) Kaisar	(Note: Coulibaly made 29 appearances during his first spell at the club between 2009 and 2010.)
24	CB	(Bulgaria)	Slavi Stalev	21	EU	2012	14	0	2015	Youth system	Cherno More Academy	
25	RB	(Bulgaria)	~~Sasho Aleksandrov~~	28	EU	2010	135	2	2014	€30,000	Beroe	(Note: Player left the club in December 2014.)
26	GK	(Bulgaria)	~~Ilko Pirgov~~	28	EU	2014	83	0	2014	Free	Litex	(Note: Pirgov made 76 appearances during his first spell at the club between 2009 and 2011.)
30	LW	(Bulgaria)	~~Dimo Atanasov~~	29	EU	2014	20	1	2016	Free	Slavia	
31	FW	(Bulgaria)	~~Miroslav Manolov~~	29	EU	2014	136	34	2014	Free	Litex	(Note: Manolov made 119 appearances and scored 32 goals during his first spell at the club between 2007 and 2013.) (Note: Manolov was wearing No.20 shirt until 24 September 2014.)
31	CB	(Bulgaria)	Toni Stoichkov	19	EU	2015	1	0	2016	Free	CSKA	
33	GK	(Bulgaria)	Georgi Kitanov	20	EU	2012	77	0	2016	Youth system	Cherno More Academy	
40	GK	(Serbia)	Aleksandar Čanović	32	Non-EU	2015	10	0	2015	Free	Free agent	
45	AM	(Bulgaria)	Kristian Peshkov	19	EU	2014	2	0		Youth system	Cherno More Academy	
84	DM	(Bulgaria)	Todor Palankov	31	EU	2013	65	2	2015	Free	Chernomorets Burgas	(Note: Palankov made 13 appearances during his first spell at the club in 2007.)
91	CB	(Bulgaria)	Zhivko Atanasov	24	EU	2012	73	2	2015	Free	Levski Sofia	

- Last updated: 30 May 2015

== Competitions ==
=== Overall ===
==== Competition Record ====
Competition	Started round	Current position/round	Final position/round	First match	Last match	Record							
Competition	Started round	Current position/round	Final position/round	First match	Last match	P	W	D	L	GF	GA	GD	Win %
A PFG	—	—	8th	20 July 2014	26 May 2015	32	15	5	12	42	36	+6	46.88
Bulgarian Cup	First Round	—	Winners	24 September 2014	30 May 2015	8	7	1	0	22	6	+16	87.50
Total						40	22	6	12	64	42	+22	55.00

Updated to match played 30 May 2015
Source: Competitions

==== Summary ====
Clean sheets	15 (11 A PFG, 4 Bulgarian Cup)
Yellow cards	92 (75 A PFG, 17 Bulgarian Cup)
Red cards	5 (4 A PFG, 1 Bulgarian Cup)
Worst discipline	(Bulgaria) Todor Palankov (11 (yellow card) )
Biggest Win	5–0 vs Lokomotiv Gorna Oryahovitsa (A)
Biggest Defeat	2–5 vs Levski Sofia (A)
Most appearances	(Bulgaria) Mihail Venkov, (Cape Verde) Sténio (35)
Top scorer	(Martinique) Mathias Coureur (9)

=== Pre-season and Friendlies ===
22 June 2014	Shkëndija (North Macedonia)	2 – 0	(Bulgaria) Cherno More	Bansko
18:00 EEST	22'; 69'	Report		Stadium: Piri Complex

25 June 2014	Horizont Turnovo (North Macedonia)	0 – 1	(Bulgaria) Cherno More	Bansko
18:00 EEST		Report	Stalev 52'	Stadium: Saint Petar; Referee: Tsanko Mindalov

27 June 2014	Mosta (Malta)	2 – 2	(Bulgaria) Cherno More	Bansko
18:00 EEST	Mohamed 18'; Kaljević 51'	Report	Kokonov 4'; Palankov 49'	Stadium: Piri Complex

2 July 2014	Marek (Bulgaria)	1 – 1	(Bulgaria) Cherno More	Bansko
17:30 EEST	K. Petkov 52'	Report	Coureur 29'	Stadium: Piri Complex; Referee: Tasko Taskov

5 July 2014	Bansko	0 – 4	Cherno More	Bansko
11:00 EEST		Report	Bozhilov 45'; Bacari 53'; Kotev 56'; Petkov 81'	Stadium: Saint Petar

7 July 2014	Haskovo	2 – 3	Cherno More	Bansko
18:30 EEST	Kyamil 61'; Hubenov 74' (pen.)	Report	Bozhilov 30', 46'; Kokonov 38'	Stadium: Saint Petar; Referee: Georgi Kabakov

9 July 2014	Bregalnica Štip (North Macedonia)	0 – 0	(Bulgaria) Cherno More	Bansko
18:15 EEST		Report		Stadium: Saint Petar; Referee: Dragan Stoykov

31 January 2015	Kolkheti (Georgia (country))	0 – 5	(Bulgaria) Cherno More	Antalya, Turkey
17:30 EET		Report	Venkov 27'; Petkov 62'; Bijev 78', 89'; Raykov 80'	Stadium: Miracle Complex

3 February 2015	Pandurii (Romania)	2 – 2	(Bulgaria) Cherno More	Antalya, Turkey
19:00 EET	Predescu 33'; Eric 90'	Report	Bijev 24', 44'	Stadium: Miracle Complex

6 February 2015	Domžale (Slovenia)	3 – 3	(Bulgaria) Cherno More	Antalya, Turkey
15:00 EET	Vuk 39'; Grvala 59'; Vancaš 72'	Report	Bijev 26', 53'; Zlatinov 77' (pen.)	Stadium: Kundu Complex

11 February 2015	Cherno More	0 – 2	Dunav	Varna
14:15 EET		Report	Budinov 16'; Kolev 62'	Stadium: Mladost

14 February 2015	Cherno More	1 – 1	Dobrudzha	Varna
13:00 EET	Zlatinov 43'	Report	Iliev 53'	Stadium: Mladost

=== A PFG ===
20 July 2014 1	Beroe	1 – 1	Cherno More	Stara Zagora
20:00 EEST	Stanchev 60' (o.g.); Kostadinov (yellow card) 68'	Report	Sténio 56'; Kotev (yellow card) 43'; Nikolov (yellow card) 88'	Stadium: Beroe; Attendance: 5,300; Referee: Stanislav Todorov

26 July 2014 2	Cherno More	0 – 0	Ludogorets	Varna
18:00 EEST	Sténio (yellow card) 37'; Palankov (yellow card) 68'; Stalev (yellow card) 90+5'	Report	M. Aleksandrov (yellow card) 50'; Marcelinho (yellow card) 61'; Vitinha (yellow card) 72'	Stadium: Ticha; Attendance: 3,790; Referee: Nikolay Yordanov

3 August 2014 3	Botev Plovdiv	2 – 1	Cherno More	Plovdiv
18:00 EEST	Jirsák 18'; Younés 84'; Chunchukov (yellow card) 27'	Report	Sténio 44'; Manolov (yellow card) 86'; Bacari (yellow card) 90+2'	Stadium: Komatevo; Attendance: 0 Referee: Angel Angelov

9 August 2014 4	Cherno More	0 – 1	Marek	Varna
18:00 EEST	Raykov (yellow card) 45+2'	Report	Petkov 4'; Mihaylov (yellow card) 35'; Andonov (yellow card) 61'	Stadium: Ticha; Attendance: 800; Referee: Vihren Manev

15 August 2014 5	Litex	3 – 0	Cherno More	Lovech
20:00 EEST	Jordán 33', 80'; Galabov 84'; Jordán (yellow card) 80'	Report	Kotev (yellow card) 2'; Aleksandrov (yellow card) 55'; Stalev (yellow card) 75' (yellow-red card) 82'	Stadium: Lovech; Attendance: 450; Referee: Stefan Apostolov

23 August 2014 6	Cherno More	3 – 0	Lokomotiv Plovdiv	Varna
18:00 EEST	Bozhilov 42'; Raykov 56', 63'; Petkov (yellow card) 82'	Report		Stadium: Ticha; Attendance: 750; Referee: Stefan Pavlov

29 August 2014 7	Levski	1 – 0	Cherno More	Sofia
20:00 EEST	Bojinov 90+5' (pen.); Krumov (yellow card) 52'; Sarmov (yellow card) 78'	Report	Aleksandrov (yellow card) 24'; Palankov (yellow card) 32'; D. Atanasov (yellow card) 70'; Z. Atanasov (red card) 90+4'; Kotev (yellow card) 90+5'	Stadium: Georgi Asparuhov; Attendance: 0 Referee: Ivaylo Stoyanov

13 September 2014 8	Cherno More	1 – 1	CSKA	Varna
17:00 EEST	Petkov 85'; Venkov (yellow card) 68'	Report	Juan Felipe 32'; Silva (yellow card) 49'; Iliev (yellow card) 57'; Platini (yellow card) 83'; Edenilson (yellow card) 90+5'	Stadium: Ticha; Attendance: 4,500; Referee: Nikola Popov

19 September 2014 9	Slavia	1 – 3	Cherno More	Sofia
17:00 EEST	Platini 56'; Platini (yellow card) 89'; Manzorro (yellow card) 90+3'	Report	Petkov 9'; Kokonov 52'; Raykov 90+4'; Petkov (yellow card) 65'; Sténio (yellow card) 88'; Rasim (yellow card) 90+1'	Stadium: Ovcha Kupel; Attendance: 150; Referee: Georgi Yordanov

28 September 2014 10	Cherno More	0 – 1	Lokomotiv Sofia	Varna
17:00 EEST	Kotev (yellow card) 73'	Report	Branekov 9'; Ranđelović (yellow card) 53'	Stadium: Ticha; Attendance: 1,460; Referee: Tasko Taskov

3 October 2014 11	Haskovo	0 – 1	Cherno More	Haskovo
16:00 EEST	Krumov (yellow card) 27'	Report	Kokonov 66'; Z. Atanasov (yellow card) 14'; Palankov (yellow card) 86'	Stadium: Haskovo; Attendance: 1,330; Referee: Stanislav Todorov

19 October 2014 12	Cherno More	4 – 0	Beroe	Varna
16:00 EEST	Manolov 22' (pen.); Coureur 36'; Kotev 64'; Raykov 86'; Palankov (yellow card) 69'; Manolov (yellow card) 82'	Report	Gadi (red card) 90+3'	Stadium: Ticha; Attendance: 1,440; Referee: Stanislav Stavrov

25 October 2014 13	Ludogorets	2 – 0	Cherno More	Razgrad
19:00 EEST	Wanderson 52'; Misidjan 75'; A. Aleksandrov (yellow card) 22'; Misidjan (yellow card) 60'	Report	Coureur (yellow card) 45'; Rasim (yellow card) 69'; Kotev (yellow card) 86'	Stadium: Ludogorets Arena; Attendance: 820; Referee: Nikolay Yordanov

2 November 2014 14	Cherno More	2 – 1	Botev Plovdiv	Varna
14:30 EET	Coureur 21'; Palankov 23'; Palankov (yellow card) 24'; Manolov (yellow card) 79'	Report	Ognyanov 62'; Baltanov (yellow card) 46'	Stadium: Ticha; Attendance: 2,430; Referee: Stanislav Todorov

8 November 2014 15	Marek	1 – 3	Cherno More	Dupnitsa
14:30 EET	K. Petkov 49'; Bliznakov (yellow card) 35'; Yoshev (yellow card) 62'	Report	Sténio 12'; Kokonov 45+1'; Manolov 60'; Rasim (yellow card) 29'; Aleksandrov (yellow card) 35'; Burkhardt (yellow card) 74'	Stadium: Bonchuk; Attendance: 580; Referee: Martin Aleksandrov

22 November 2014 16	Cherno More	0 – 3	Litex	Varna
13:15 EET	Aleksandrov (red card) 55'; Klok (yellow card) 72'	Report	Jordán 29'; Asprilla 90'; Despodov 90+2'; Nedyalkov (yellow card) 35'; Mendy (yellow card) 56'; Jordán (yellow card) 56'	Stadium: Ticha; Attendance: 1,190; Referee: Nikola Popov

29 November 2014 17	Lokomotiv Plovdiv	1 – 1	Cherno More	Plovdiv
14:00 EET	Kamburov 38'; Karagaren (yellow card) 86'; Moldovanov (red card)	Report	Coureur 80'; Sténio (yellow card) 45+5'	Stadium: Lokomotiv; Attendance: 900; Referee: Stanislav Stavrov

6 December 2014 18	Cherno More	1 – 0	Levski	Varna
12:30 EET	Coureur 43'; Burkhardt (yellow card) 47' (yellow-red card) 90'; Manolov (yellow card) 48'; Kotev (yellow card) 54'; Stanchev (yellow card) 70'; Pirgov (yellow card) 90+3'	Report	Pedro (yellow card) 28'; Krumov (yellow card) 35'; Bedoya (yellow card) 54'; Dimov (yellow card) 57'; Orachev (yellow card) 82'; Añete (yellow card) 87' (red card) 90+4'; Ognyanov (yellow card) 88'; Stoychev (yellow card) 90+2'	Stadium: Ticha; Attendance: 2,600; Referee: Georgi Yordanov

13 December 2014 19	CSKA	3 – 1	Cherno More	Sofia
16:00 EET	Oršulić 5'; Joachim 64', 68'; Milisavljević (yellow card) 78'	Report	Sténio 14'; Bozhilov (yellow card) 25'; Palankov (yellow card) 29'; Venkov (yellow card) 52'; Sténio (yellow card) 66'	Stadium: Balgarska Armiya; Attendance: 1,710; Referee: Nikola Popov

27 February 2015 20	Cherno More	2 – 0	Slavia	Varna
14:30 EET	Zlatinov 43' (pen.); Hernández 69'; Klok (yellow card) 33'; Bijev (yellow card) 42'; Venkov (yellow card) 73'; Bacari (yellow card) 78'	Report	Panov (red card) 41'; Fonseca (yellow card) 64'	Stadium: Ticha; Attendance: 970; Referee: Ivaylo Stoyanov

9 March 2015 21	Lokomotiv Sofia	2 – 1	Cherno More	Sofia
15:30 EET	Yordanov 17'; Genov 76'; Tom (yellow card) 33'; Helton (yellow card) 62'	Report	Kokonov 43'; Coulibaly (yellow card) 57'; Sténio (yellow card) 65'; Coureur (yellow card) 75'	Stadium: Lokomotiv; Attendance: 100; Referee: Georgi Yordanov

13 March 2015 22	Cherno More	1 – 0	Haskovo	Varna
14:30 EET	Sténio 45+4' (pen.); Klok (yellow card) 36'; Sténio (yellow card) 57'; Coureur (yellow card) 90+3'	Report	Marem (yellow card) 41'; Krumov (yellow card) 45+2'; Skerlev (yellow card) 45+4'; Lozev (yellow card) 66'; Chanev (yellow card) 86'	Stadium: Ticha; Attendance: 440; Referee: Martin Stoimenov

20 March 2015 23	Cherno More	1 – 0	Marek	Varna
15:30 EET	Burkhardt 45'; Raykov (yellow card) 19'; Kokonov (yellow card) 29'; Coulibaly (yellow card) 30'; Palankov (yellow card) 66'; Venkov (yellow card) 87'	Report	Kolev (yellow card) 5'; Viyachki (yellow card) 51'	Stadium: Ticha; Attendance: 380; Referee: Angel Angelov

3 April 2015 24	Levski	5 – 2	Cherno More	Sofia
20:00 EEST	Abdi 4'; Kraev 17'; Domovchiyski 23'; Coulibaly 76' (o.g.); B. Tsonev 90+2'; Bedoya (yellow card) 84'	Report	Zlatinov 9'; Raykov 73'	Stadium: Georgi Asparuhov; Attendance: 550; Referee: Vladimir Valkov

10 April 2015 25	Cherno More	2 – 0	Haskovo	Varna
17:00 EEST	Hernández 71'; Raykov 77'; Zlatinov (yellow card) 27'; Georgiev (yellow card) 42'; Palankov (yellow card) 61'; Z. Atanasov (yellow card) 90+3'	Report	Lozev (yellow card) 28'; Malamov (yellow card) 41'; Marem (yellow card) 70'; Aleksiev (yellow card) 89'	Stadium: Ticha; Attendance: 430; Referee: Volen Chinkov

19 April 2015 26	Cherno More	1 – 1	Slavia	Varna
15:15 EEST	Burkhardt 57'	Report	Dimitrov 53'; Manzorro (yellow card) 7'; Petkov (yellow card) 82'; Semerdzhiev (yellow card) 90'	Stadium: Ticha; Attendance: 1,280; Referee: Georgi Ignatov

24 April 2015 27	Lokomotiv Plovdiv	0 – 1	Cherno More	Plovdiv
20:00 EEST	Sandanski (yellow card) 17'; Trajanov (yellow card) 25'	Report	Kokonov 68'; Petkov (yellow card) 17'; Bozhilov (yellow card) 30'; Z. Atanasov (yellow card) 80'; Bacari (yellow card) 90+2'; Nikolov (yellow card) 90+3'	Stadium: Lokomotiv; Attendance: 900; Referee: Angel Angelov

2 May 2015 28	Marek	0 – 2	Cherno More	Dupnitsa
17:30 EEST	Manolov (yellow card) 18'; Garov (yellow card) 30'	Report	Kokonov 27'; Bijev 88'; Georgiev (yellow card) 45+1'; Bijev (yellow card) 82'	Stadium: Bonchuk; Attendance: 280; Referee: Georgi Dimitrov

9 May 2015 29	Cherno More	0 – 2	Levski	Varna
17:30 EEST	Hernández (yellow card) 38'	Report	Domovchiyski 72'; Bedoya 90+2'; Kraev (yellow card) 21'; B. Tsonev (yellow card) 35'; Ninu (yellow card) 55'; Velev (yellow card) 75'	Stadium: Ticha; Attendance: 4,710; Referee: Martin Stoimenov

18 May 2015 30	Haskovo	1 – 3	Cherno More	Haskovo
17:30 EEST	Uzunov 72'; Raynov (yellow card) 71'	Report	Hernández 33'; Bijev 39'; Burkhardt 62'; Z. Atanasov (yellow card) 72'	Stadium: Haskovo; Attendance: 120; Referee: Dragan Stoykov

22 May 2015 31	Slavia	1 – 3	Cherno More	Sofia
17:30 EEST	Manzorro 89'; Stoyanov (yellow card) 47'; Kirev (red card) 56'	Report	Bacari 6'; Kokonov 14'; Coureur 90+1'; Klok (yellow card) 29'; Palankov (yellow card) 40'; Rasim (yellow card) 68'; Petkov (yellow card) 86'	Stadium: Ovcha Kupel; Attendance: 80; Referee: Stefan Apostolov

26 May 2015 32	Cherno More	1 – 2	Lokomotiv Plovdiv	Varna
17:30 EEST	Georgiev 52'; Yovchev (yellow card) 19'	Report	De Vriese 28'; Karagaren 75'; Valchev (yellow card) 31'	Stadium: Ticha; Attendance: 220; Referee: Angel Bayaltsaliev

==== League table ====
===== First phase =====
Pos	Team	Pld	W	D	L	GF	GA	GD	Pts	Qualification
6	Botev Plovdiv	22	11	3	8	32	26	+6	36	Qualification for championship group
7	Levski Sofia	22	10	4	8	36	25	+11	34	Qualification for relegation group
8	Cherno More Varna	22	9	4	9	26	24	+2	31	Qualification for relegation group
9	Slavia Sofia	22	6	5	11	24	30	−6	23	Qualification for relegation group
10	Lokomotiv Plovdiv	22	5	5	12	13	36	−23	20	Qualification for relegation group

Source: bulgarian-football.com
Rules for classification: 1st points; 2nd head-to-head points; 3rd head-to-head goal difference; 4th head-to-head goals scored; 5th head-to-head away goals scored; 6th season goal difference; 7th season goals scored; 8th "sportsmanship" (R & Y cards); 9th draw

===== Relegation group =====
Pos	Team	Pld	W	D	L	GF	GA	GD	Pts	Qualification or relegation
7	Levski Sofia	32	17	5	10	66	33	+33	56	
8	Cherno More	32	15	5	12	42	36	+6	50	Qualification for Europa League second qualifying round (Note: Cherno More Varna qualified for the 2015–16 UEFA Europa League second qualifying round by winning the 2014–15 Bulgarian Cup.)
9	Slavia Sofia	32	12	7	13	40	38	+2	43	
10	Lokomotiv Plovdiv	32	9	5	18	28	52	−24	32	
11	Marek (R)	32	5	5	22	14	71	−57	20	Relegation to 2015-16 V Group
12	Haskovo (R)	32	4	3	25	18	71	−53	15	Relegation to 2015-16 V Group

Source: bulgarian-football.com, UEFA.com (in English)
Rules for classification: 1st points; 2nd head-to-head points; 3rd head-to-head goal difference; 4th head-to-head goals scored; 5th head-to-head away goals scored; 6th season goal difference; 7th season goals scored; 8th "sportsmanship" (R & Y cards); 9th draw
(R) Relegated

==== Results summary ====
Overall								Home						Away					
Pld	W	D	L	GF	GA	GD	Pts	W	D	L	GF	GA	GD	W	D	L	GF	GA	GD
32	15	5	12	42	36	+6	50	8	3	5	19	12	+7	7	2	7	23	24	−1

Last updated: 26 May 2015.
Source: bulgarian-football.com

==== League performance ====
Round	1	2	3	4	5	6	7	8	9	10	11	12	13	14	15	16	17	18	19	20	21	22	23	24	25	26	27	28	29	30	31	32
Ground	A	H	A	H	A	H	A	H	A	H	A	H	A	H	A	H	A	H	A	H	A	H	H	A	H	H	A	A	H	A	A	H
Result	D	D	L	L	L	W	L	D	W	L	W	W	L	W	W	L	D	W	L	W	L	W	W	L	W	D	W	W	L	W	W	L
Position	9	8	11	12	12	11	10	9	8	8	8	8	8	8	8	8	8	8	8	8	8	8	8	8	8	8	8	8	8	8	8	8

Source: bulgarian-football.com
A = Away; H = Home; W = Win; D = Draw; L = Loss

==== Score overview ====
Opposition	Home score	Away score	Home score	Away score	Double	Treble	Quadruple
	First phase		Second phase				
Beroe	4–0	1–1			No	—N/a	—N/a
Botev Plovdiv	2–1	1–2			No	—N/a	—N/a
CSKA	1–1	1–3			No	—N/a	—N/a
Haskovo	1–0	1–0	2–0	3–1	Yes	Yes	Yes
Levski	1–0	0–1	0–2	2–5	No	No	No
Litex	0–3	0–3			No	—N/a	—N/a
Lokomotiv Plovdiv	3–0	1–1	1–2	1–0	Yes	No	No
Lokomotiv Sofia	0–1	1–2			No	—N/a	—N/a
Ludogorets	0–0	0–2			No	—N/a	—N/a
Marek	0–1	3–1	1–0	2–0	Yes	Yes	No
Slavia	2–0	3–1	1–1	3–1	Yes	Yes	No

=== Bulgarian Cup ===
24 September 2014 1st Round	Sozopol	0 – 2	Cherno More	Sozopol
16:00 EEST	Mitev (yellow card)	Report	Petkov 42'; Manolov 82'	Stadium: Arena Sozopol; Attendance: 590; Referee: Georgi Ignatov

28 October 2014 2nd Round/1st Leg	Cherno More	2 – 0	Slavia	Varna
14:30 EET	Sténio 45+4'; Rasim 62'; Klok (yellow card) 44'; Sténio (yellow card) 75'	Report	Burgzorg (yellow card) 48'; Yankov (yellow card) 90'	Stadium: Ticha; Attendance: 380; Referee: Georgi Yordanov

3 December 2014 2nd Round/2nd Leg	Slavia	2 – 2 (2 – 4 agg.)	Cherno More	Sofia
13:00 EET	Manzorro 42'; Fonseca 72'; Vasilev (yellow card) 28'	Report	Manolov 33'; Petkov 45'; Stanchev (yellow card) 23'; Petkov (yellow card) 28'	Stadium: Ovcha Kupel; Attendance: 50; Referee: Ivaylo Stoyanov

21 February 2015 3rd Round/1st Leg	Cherno More	1 – 0	Lokomotiv Gorna Oryahovitsa	Varna
13:00 EET	Rasim 90+2'; Klok (yellow card) 59'; Venkov (yellow card) 75'; Stanchev (yellow card) 79'; Rasim (yellow card) 90+3'	Report	M. Ivanov (yellow card) 14'; Smirnov (yellow card) 20'; Balakov (yellow card) 81'	Stadium: Ticha; Attendance: 1,340; Referee: Martin Aleksandrov

5 March 2015 3rd Round/2nd Leg	Lokomotiv Gorna Oryahovitsa	0 – 5 (0 – 6 agg.)	Cherno More	Gorna Oryahovitsa
14:00 EET	Harizanov (yellow card) 21'	Report	Burkhardt 2'; Kotev 23'; Coulibaly 25'; Bijev 38'; Sténio 44'; Coulibaly (yellow card) 18'; Bacari (yellow card) 71'	Stadium: Lokomotiv; Attendance: 2,190; Referee: Vladimir Valkov

7 April 2015 Semifinal/1st Leg	Cherno More	5 – 1	Lokomotiv Plovdiv	Varna
17:00 EEST	Raykov 2'; Bijev 44'; Venkov 48'; Coureur 59'; Bacari 76'; Burkhardt (yellow card) 90+3'	Report	Bourabia 69'; Bourabia (yellow card) 54'; Trajanov (yellow card) 58'; Dimitrov (yellow card) 62'	Stadium: Ticha; Attendance: 1,600; Referee: Tasko Taskov

28 April 2015 Semifinal/2nd Leg	Lokomotiv Plovdiv	2 – 3 (3 – 8 agg.)	Cherno More	Plovdiv
19:00 EEST	Delev 39'; Coulibaly 67' (o.g.); Bourabia (yellow card) 76'; Osmanov (yellow card) 81'	Report	Z. Atanasov 4'; Coureur 89', 90+1'; Bacari (yellow card) 70'; Palankov (yellow card) 86'	Stadium: Lokomotiv; Attendance: 380; Referee: Stefan Pavlov

30 May 2015 Final	Levski	1 – 2 (a.e.t.)	Cherno More	Burgas
20:00 EEST	Añete 72'; Stoychev (yellow card) 20'; Belaïd (yellow card) 24'; Añete (yellow card) 105+1'; Minev (red card) 120+4'	Report	Bacari 90+2'; Coureur 119'; Sténio (yellow card) 34' (yellow-red card) 38'; Klok (yellow card) 82'; Venkov (yellow card) 98'; Palankov (yellow card) 99'; Hernández (yellow card) 106'	Stadium: Lazur; Attendance: 13,910; Referee: Ivaylo Stoyanov

== Statistics ==
=== Player Appearances ===
Key:
‡ On loan from another club * First appearance(s) for the club

- # = Squad number
- **Pos** = Playing position
- **P** = Number of games played
- **G** = Number of goals scored
- **GK** = Goalkeeper
- **DF** = Defender
- **MF** = Midfielder
- **FW** = Forward
- = Yellow cards
- = Red cards
- † Permanent player left club during the season
- ¤ Loaned to another club for part or all of season

Correct as of 30 May 2015. Starting appearances are listed first, followed by substitute appearances in parentheses where applicable.

No.	Pos	Name	P	G	P	G	P	G	A yellow card	A red card	Notes
No.	Pos	Name	League		Bulgarian Cup		Total		Discipline		Notes
1	GK	(Bulgaria) Iliya Nikolov	3(2)	0	1	0	4(2)	0	2	0	
3	MF	(Bulgaria) Daniel Georgiev	7(4)	1	0(1)	0	7(5)	1	2	0	
4	DF	(Bulgaria) Mihail Venkov	28	0	7	1	**35**	1	6	0	
4	MF	(Bulgaria) Aleksandar Yovchev	1	0	0(1)	0	1(1)	0	1	0	
5	DF	(Bulgaria) Stefan Stanchev	13(2)	0	5	0	18(2)	0	3	0	
6	DF	(Bulgaria) Kiril Kotev (c)	25(1)	1	4	1	29(1)	2	6	0	
7	MF	(Bulgaria) Bekir Rasim	3(10)	0	2(2)	2	5(12)	2	5	0	
7	DF	(Bulgaria) Martin Kostadinov	1	0	0(1)	0	1(1)	0	0	0	
8	MF	(Cape Verde) Sténio	27(1)	5	7	2	34(1)	7	7	1	
8	MF	(Bulgaria) Aleksandar Popov	1	0	0	0	1	0	0	0	
9	FW	(Spain) Bacari	5(7)	1	0(5)	2	5(12)	3	5	0	
10	MF	(Netherlands) Marc Klok	11(2)	0	6	0	17(2)	0	7	0	
10	MF	(Bulgaria) Nikolay Minkov	1	0	0	0	1	0	0	0	
11	FW	(Bulgaria) Zhivko Petkov	8(10)	2	4	2	12(10)	4	5	0	
11	MF	(Bulgaria) Iliyan Nedelchev	1	0	0	0	1	0	0	0	
12	GK	(Bulgaria) Hristiyan Hristov †	0	0	0	0	0	0	0	0	
13	MF	(Bulgaria) Simeon Raykov	19(4)	6	5	1	24(4)	7	2	0	
14	FW	(Bulgaria) Georgi Bozhilov	16(4)	1	0(1)	0	16(5)	1	2	0	
15	MF	(Bulgaria) Petar Zlatinov †	4(1)	2	1(1)	0	5(2)	2	1	0	
17	MF	(Bulgaria) Ivan Kokonov	**23(6)**	**7**	1(3)	0	24(9)	7	1	0	
18	MF	(Poland) Marcin Burkhardt	15(4)	3	7	1	22(4)	4	2	1	
19	MF	(Martinique) Mathias Coureur	16(5)	5	8	4	24(5)	**9**	3	0	
20	FW	(Bulgaria) Villyan Bijev	6(5)	2	4	2	10(5)	4	2	0	
21	MF	(Bulgaria) Emil Iliev	1	0	0	0	1	0	0	0	
22	MF	(Colombia) Sebastián Hernández ‡	7(4)	3	3	0	10(4)	3	2	0	
22	MF	(Armenia) Karen Madoyan	1	0	0	0	1	0	0	0	
23	GK	(Bulgaria) Kiril Akalski †	0	0	0	0	0	0	0	0	
23	DF	(Mali) Mamoutou Coulibaly	10	0	2(1)	1	11(2)	1	3	0	
24	DF	(Bulgaria) Slavi Stalev	5(2)	0	0(2)	0	5(4)	0	1	1	
25	DF	(Bulgaria) Sasho Aleksandrov †	16(1)	0	2	0	18(1)	0	3	1	
26	GK	(Bulgaria) Ilko Pirgov †	7	0	3	0	10	0	1	0	
30	MF	(Bulgaria) Dimo Atanasov †	1(5)	0	2(1)	0	3(6)	0	1	0	
31	FW	(Bulgaria) Miroslav Manolov †	12(5)	2	2(1)	2	14(6)	4	4	0	
31	DF	(Bulgaria) Toni Stoichkov	1	0	0	0	1	0	0	0	
33	GK	(Bulgaria) Georgi Kitanov	12	0	0	0	12	0	0	0	
40	GK	(Serbia) Aleksandar Čanović	10	0	4	0	14	0	0	0	
45	MF	(Bulgaria) Kristian Peshkov	1	0	0	0	1	0	0	0	
84	MF	(Bulgaria) Todor Palankov	23	1	3(2)	0	26(2)	1	**11**	0	
91	DF	(Bulgaria) Zhivko Atanasov	13(8)	0	5(2)	1	18(10)	1	4	1	

=== Minutes On The Pitch ===
Includes injury time. Positions indicate the most natural position of the particular player, followed by alternative position(s) where he actually started at least one game during the course of the season.

No.	Position	Alternative Position(s)	Player	A PFG	Bulgarian Cup	Total
1	GK		(Bulgaria) Iliya Nikolov	356	95	451
3	CM	DM / RW	(Bulgaria) Daniel Georgiev	594	16	610
4	LB	CB	(Bulgaria) Mihail Venkov	**2678**	671	**3349**
4	DM	LB	(Bulgaria) Aleksandar Yovchev	93	48	141
5	RB	CB / DM	(Bulgaria) Stefan Stanchev	1178	445	1623
6	CB		(Bulgaria) Kiril Kotev	2289	278	2567
7	AM		(Bulgaria) Bekir Rasim	394	247	641
7	RB	RW	(Bulgaria) Martin Kostadinov	93	5	98
8	DM	CM / AM / RB	(Cape Verde) Sténio	2612	515	3127
8	CM		(Bulgaria) Aleksandar Popov	93	0	93
9	FW	RW / RWB	(Spain) Bacari	532	205	737
10	CM	DM	(Netherlands) Marc Klok	991	519	1510
10	AM	FW / RW	(Bulgaria) Nikolay Minkov	93	0	93
11	FW		(Bulgaria) Zhivko Petkov	803	304	1107
11	RW		(Bulgaria) Iliyan Nedelchev	93	0	93
12	GK		(Bulgaria) Hristiyan Hristov	0	0	0
13	LW	LWB / RW	(Bulgaria) Simeon Raykov	1748	393	2141
14	FW	AM	(Bulgaria) Georgi Bozhilov	1593	47	1640
15	CM	AM / LW	(Bulgaria) Petar Zlatinov	216	115	331
17	LW	LWB / RW / AM	(Bulgaria) Ivan Kokonov	2064	216	2280
18	CM	AM / DM	(Poland) Marcin Burkhardt	1386	655	2041
19	RW	RWB / LW / LB	(Martinique) Mathias Coureur	1496	**736**	2232
20	FW		(Bulgaria) Villyan Bijev	684	342	1026
21	DM		(Bulgaria) Emil Iliev	30	0	30
22	AM	RW	(Colombia) Sebastián Hernández	779	285	1064
22	AM		(Armenia) Karen Madoyan	93	0	93
23	GK		(Bulgaria) Kiril Akalski	0	0	0
23	CB	RB / LB	(Mali) Mamoutou Coulibaly	934	203	1137
24	CB		(Bulgaria) Slavi Stalev	464	32	496
25	RB	CB / RW	(Bulgaria) Sasho Aleksandrov	1469	191	1660
26	GK		(Bulgaria) Ilko Pirgov	671	285	956
30	LW	LWB	(Bulgaria) Dimo Atanasov	171	213	384
31	FW		(Bulgaria) Miroslav Manolov	1238	236	1474
31	CB		(Bulgaria) Toni Stoichkov	93	0	93
33	GK		(Bulgaria) Georgi Kitanov	1107	0	1107
40	GK		(Serbia) Aleksandar Čanović	916	417	1333
45	AM	FW	(Bulgaria) Kristian Peshkov	30	0	30
84	DM	CM / AM / CB	(Bulgaria) Todor Palankov	1996	389	2385
91	CB	DM	(Bulgaria) Zhivko Atanasov	1345	567	1912

As of

=== Débuts ===
Players making their first team Cherno More début in a competitive match.

No.	Position	Player	Date	Opponents	Ground	Competition
1	GK	(Bulgaria) Iliya Nikolov	20 July 2014	Beroe	Beroe Stadium	A PFG
8	MF	(Cape Verde) Sténio	20 July 2014	Beroe	Beroe Stadium	A PFG
11	FW	(Bulgaria) Zhivko Petkov	20 July 2014	Beroe	Beroe Stadium	A PFG
19	MF	(Martinique) Mathias Coureur	26 July 2014	Ludogorets	Ticha Stadium	A PFG
18	MF	(Poland) Marcin Burkhardt	13 September 2014	CSKA	Ticha Stadium	A PFG
10	MF	(Netherlands) Marc Klok	25 October 2014	Ludogorets	Ludogorets Arena	A PFG
28	MF	(Bulgaria) Aleksandar Yovchev	3 December 2014	Slavia	Ovcha Kupel Stadium	Bulgarian Cup
40	GK	(Serbia) Aleksandar Čanović	21 February 2015	Lokomotiv Gorna Oryahovitsa	Ticha Stadium	Bulgarian Cup
20	FW	(Bulgaria) Villyan Bijev	27 February 2015	Slavia	Ticha Stadium	A PFG
22	MF	(Colombia) Sebastián Hernández	27 February 2015	Slavia	Ticha Stadium	A PFG
10	MF	(Bulgaria) Nikolay Minkov	26 May 2015	Lokomotiv Plovdiv	Ticha Stadium	A PFG
11	MF	(Bulgaria) Iliyan Nedelchev	26 May 2015	Lokomotiv Plovdiv	Ticha Stadium	A PFG
22	MF	(Armenia) Karen Madoyan	26 May 2015	Lokomotiv Plovdiv	Ticha Stadium	A PFG
31	DF	(Bulgaria) Toni Stoichkov	26 May 2015	Lokomotiv Plovdiv	Ticha Stadium	A PFG
21	MF	(Bulgaria) Emil Iliev	26 May 2015	Lokomotiv Plovdiv	Ticha Stadium	A PFG

=== Goalscorers ===
Rank	Pos.	Player	L	C	Total
1	MF	(Martinique) Mathias Coureur	5	4	9
2	MF	(Bulgaria) Ivan Kokonov	7	0	7
2	MF	(Bulgaria) Simeon Raykov	6	1	7
2	MF	(Cape Verde) Sténio	5	2	7
3	MF	(Poland) Marcin Burkhardt	3	1	4
3	FW	(Bulgaria) Miroslav Manolov	2	2	4
3	FW	(Bulgaria) Zhivko Petkov	2	2	4
3	FW	(Bulgaria) Villyan Bijev	2	2	4
4	MF	(Colombia) Sebastián Hernández	3	0	3
4	FW	(Spain) Bacari	1	2	3
5	MF	(Bulgaria) Petar Zlatinov	2	0	2
5	DF	(Bulgaria) Kiril Kotev	1	1	2
5	MF	(Bulgaria) Bekir Rasim	0	2	2
6	FW	(Bulgaria) Georgi Bozhilov	1	0	1
6	MF	(Bulgaria) Todor Palankov	1	0	1
6	MF	(Bulgaria) Daniel Georgiev	1	0	1
6	DF	(Mali) Mamoutou Coulibaly	0	1	1
6	DF	(Bulgaria) Mihail Venkov	0	1	1
6	DF	(Bulgaria) Zhivko Atanasov	0	1	1
Own goals			0	0	0
**Totals**			**42**	**22**	64

As of

=== Assists ===
Rank	Pos.	Player	L	C	Total
1	MF	(Bulgaria) Simeon Raykov	4	3	7
2	MF	(Martinique) Mathias Coureur	4	1	5
3	DF	(Bulgaria) Mihail Venkov	3	0	3
3	MF	(Bulgaria) Ivan Kokonov	2	1	3
3	FW	(Bulgaria) Zhivko Petkov	2	1	3
3	MF	(Colombia) Sebastián Hernández	2	1	3
3	MF	(Poland) Marcin Burkhardt	1	2	3
3	FW	(Bulgaria) Villyan Bijev	1	2	3
4	FW	(Spain) Bacari	2	0	2
4	FW	(Bulgaria) Georgi Bozhilov	1	1	2
4	MF	(Netherlands) Marc Klok	0	2	2
5	DF	(Bulgaria) Kiril Kotev	1	0	1
5	DF	(Bulgaria) Slavi Stalev	1	0	1
5	MF	(Cape Verde) Sténio	1	0	1
5	MF	(Bulgaria) Bekir Rasim	1	0	1
5	MF	(Bulgaria) Todor Palankov	1	0	1
5	FW	(Bulgaria) Miroslav Manolov	0	1	1
**Totals**			**26**	**15**	41

As of

=== Goalscorers' Effectiveness ===
==== Goals Per Game ====
Rank	Player	Position	GPG Ratio
1	(Martinique) Mathias Coureur	RW	0.310
2	(Bulgaria) Petar Zlatinov	CM	0.286
3	(Bulgaria) Villyan Bijev	FW	0.267
4	(Bulgaria) Simeon Raykov	LW	0.250
5	(Colombia) Sebastián Hernández	AM	0.214
6	(Bulgaria) Ivan Kokonov	LW	0.212
7	(Cape Verde) Sténio	DM	0.200
7	(Bulgaria) Miroslav Manolov	FW	0.200
8	(Bulgaria) Zhivko Petkov	FW	0.182
9	(Spain) Bacari	FW	0.176
10	(Poland) Marcin Burkhardt	CM	0.153
11	(Bulgaria) Bekir Rasim	AM	0.118
12	(Bulgaria) Daniel Georgiev	CM	0.083
13	(Mali) Mamoutou Coulibaly	CB / RB	0.077
14	(Bulgaria) Kiril Kotev	CB	0.067
15	(Bulgaria) Georgi Bozhilov	FW / AM	0.048
16	(Bulgaria) Zhivko Atanasov	CB	0.036
16	(Bulgaria) Todor Palankov	DM	0.036
17	(Bulgaria) Mihail Venkov	LB	0.029

As of

==== Minutes Per Goal ====
Rank	Player	Position	MPG Ratio
1	(Bulgaria) Petar Zlatinov	CM	165.5
2	(Spain) Bacari	FW	245.7
3	(Martinique) Mathias Coureur	RW	248
4	(Bulgaria) Villyan Bijev	FW	256.5
5	(Bulgaria) Zhivko Petkov	FW	276.8
6	(Bulgaria) Simeon Raykov	LW	305.9
7	(Bulgaria) Bekir Rasim	AM	320.5
8	(Bulgaria) Ivan Kokonov	LW	325.7
9	(Colombia) Sebastián Hernández	AM	354.7
10	(Bulgaria) Miroslav Manolov	FW	368.5
11	(Cape Verde) Sténio	DM	446.7
12	(Poland) Marcin Burkhardt	CM	510.3
13	(Bulgaria) Daniel Georgiev	CM	610
14	(Mali) Mamoutou Coulibaly	CB / RB	1137
15	(Bulgaria) Kiril Kotev	CB	1284
16	(Bulgaria) Georgi Bozhilov	FW / AM	1640
17	(Bulgaria) Zhivko Atanasov	CB	1912
18	(Bulgaria) Todor Palankov	DM	2385
19	(Bulgaria) Mihail Venkov	LB	3349

As of

=== Own Goals ===
Own Goals In Favour
Date	Pos.	Player	Opponent	Competition

Own Goals Conceded
Date	Pos.	Player	Opponent	Competition
20 Jul	DF	(Bulgaria) Stefan Stanchev	Beroe	A PFG
3 Apr	DF	(Mali) Mamoutou Coulibaly	Levski	A PFG
28 Apr	DF	(Mali) Mamoutou Coulibaly	Lokomotiv Plovdiv	Bulgarian Cup

=== Clean sheets ===
R	No.	Nat	Goalkeeper	L	C	Total
1	40	(Serbia)	Aleksandar Čanović	4	2	**6**
2	33	(Bulgaria)	Georgi Kitanov	4	–	**4**
3	26	(Bulgaria)	Ilko Pirgov	1	2	**3**
4	1	(Bulgaria)	Iliya Nikolov	2	0	**2**
			**Totals**	**11**	**4**	**15**

=== Suspensions served ===
Date	Matches Missed	Player	Reason	Opponents Missed
7 May 2014	1	(Bulgaria) Georgi Kitanov	9th (yellow card) vs Levski (previous season)	Beroe (A)
7 May 2014	2	(Spain) Bacari	13th (yellow card) vs Levski (previous season)	Beroe (A), Ludogorets (H)
18 May 2014	2	(Bulgaria) Dimo Atanasov	9th (yellow card) vs Ludogorets (previous season)	Beroe (A), Ludogorets (H)
15 August 2014	1	(Bulgaria) Slavi Stalev	(red card) vs Litex	Lokomotiv Plovdiv (H)
29 August 2014	1	(Bulgaria) Zhivko Atanasov	(red card) vs Levski	CSKA (H)
25 October 2014	1	(Bulgaria) Kiril Kotev	5th (yellow card) vs Ludogorets	Slavia (H) (C)
2 November 2014	1	(Bulgaria) Todor Palankov	5th (yellow card) vs Botev Plovdiv	Marek (A)
22 November 2014	3	(Bulgaria) Sasho Aleksandrov	(red card) vs Litex	Lokomotiv Plovdiv (A), Slavia (A) (C), Levski (H)
6 December 2014	1	(Poland) Marcin Burkhardt	(red card) vs Levski	CSKA (A)
13 December 2014	1	(Cape Verde) Sténio	5th (yellow card) vs CSKA	Lokomotiv Gorna Oryahovitsa (H) (C)
13 March 2015	1	(Netherlands) Marc Klok	5th (yellow card) vs Haskovo	Marek (H)
20 March 2015	1	(Bulgaria) Mihail Venkov	5th (yellow card) vs Marek	Levski (A)
28 April 2015	1	(Spain) Bacari	5th (yellow card) vs Lokomotiv Plovdiv	Marek (A)
28 April 2015	2	(Bulgaria) Todor Palankov	9th (yellow card) vs Lokomotiv Plovdiv	Marek (A), Levski (H)
22 May 2015	1	(Bulgaria) Bekir Rasim	5th (yellow card) vs Slavia	Lokomotiv Plovdiv (H)
22 May 2015	1	(Bulgaria) Zhivko Petkov	5th (yellow card) vs Slavia	Lokomotiv Plovdiv (H)
30 May 2015	1	(Cape Verde) Sténio	(red card) vs Levski	first game of next season

=== Injuries ===
Players in bold are still out from their injuries.
Players listed will/have miss(ed) at least one competitive game (missing from whole match day squad).

Date	No.	Pos.	Name	Injury	Note	Recovery time	Games missed	Source
20 June 2014	23	GK	(Bulgaria) Kiril Akalski	Dislocated shoulder	Occurred during pre-season training.	Exact time unknown	2	
9 August 2014	9	FW	(Spain) Bacari	Ruptured ACL	Occurred during match against Marek.	6 months	18	
9 August 2014	20	FW	(Bulgaria) Miroslav Manolov	Pulled hamstring	Occurred during match against Marek.	2 weeks	2	
23 August 2014	3	MF	(Bulgaria) Daniel Georgiev	Ruptured ACL	Occurred during match against Lokomotiv Plovdiv.	6 months	21	
27 August 2014	24	DF	(Bulgaria) Slavi Stalev	Unspecified injury	Occurred during training.	Exact time unknown	1	
13 September 2014	84	MF	(Bulgaria) Todor Palankov	Pulled hamstring	Occurred during match against CSKA.	2 weeks	2	
30 September 2014	13	MF	(Bulgaria) Simeon Raykov	Cracked rib	Occurred during match against Lokomotiv Sofia.	Exact time unknown	1	
30 September 2014	14	FW	(Bulgaria) Georgi Bozhilov	Chronic hamstring injury	Occurred during match against Lokomotiv Sofia.	Exact time unknown	6	
30 September 2014	5	DF	(Bulgaria) Stefan Stanchev	Pulled hamstring	Occurred during training.	2 weeks	4	
19 October 2014	33	GK	(Bulgaria) Georgi Kitanov	Tibia fracture	Occurred during match against Beroe.	4 months	25	
19 October 2014	24	DF	(Bulgaria) Slavi Stalev	Dislocated shoulder	Occurred during match against Beroe.	Exact time unknown	2	
24 October 2014	13	MF	(Bulgaria) Simeon Raykov	Bronchitis	Occurred before match against Ludogorets.	1 week	2	
1 November 2014	7	MF	(Bulgaria) Bekir Rasim	Toe injury	Occurred during training.	Exact time unknown	1	
26 November 2014	10	MF	(Netherlands) Marc Klok	Pulled hamstring	Occurred during training.	2 weeks	4	
29 November 2014	6	DF	(Bulgaria) Kiril Kotev	Nasal fracture	Occurred during match against Lokomotiv Plovdiv.	Exact time unknown	1	
31 January 2015	14	FW	(Bulgaria) Georgi Bozhilov	Unspecified injury	Occurred during pre-season match against Kolkheti.	Exact time unknown	5	
6 February 2015	8	MF	(Cape Verde) Sténio	Pulled hamstring	Occurred during pre-season match against Domžale.	3 weeks	1	
18 February 2015	20	FW	(Bulgaria) Villyan Bijev	Pulled hamstring	Occurred during pre-season training.	2 weeks	1	
19 February 2015	24	DF	(Bulgaria) Slavi Stalev	Unspecified injury	Occurred during pre-season training.	Exact time unknown	7	
8 March 2015	9	FW	(Spain) Bacari	Unspecified injury	Occurred during training.	Exact time unknown	1	
8 March 2015	13	MF	(Bulgaria) Simeon Raykov	Unspecified injury	Occurred during training.	Exact time unknown	1	
9 March 2015	5	DF	(Bulgaria) Stefan Stanchev	Ankle injury	Occurred during match against Lokomotiv Sofia.	Exact time unknown	2	
12 March 2015	84	MF	(Bulgaria) Todor Palankov	Unspecified injury	Occurred during training.	1 week	1	
13 March 2015	18	MF	(Poland) Marcin Burkhardt	Kidney stone	Occurred before match against Haskovo.	1 week	1	
22 April 2015	15	MF	(Bulgaria) Petar Zlatinov	Pulled hamstring	Occurred during training.	2 weeks	3	
24 April 2015	5	DF	(Bulgaria) Stefan Stanchev	Clavicle fracture	Occurred during match against Lokomotiv Plovdiv.	2 months	7	
28 April 2015	22	MF	(Colombia) Sebastián Hernández	Ankle injury	Occurred during warm-up before match against Lokomotiv Plovdiv.	1 week	1	
28 April 2015	13	MF	(Bulgaria) Simeon Raykov	Hand fracture	Occurred during match against Lokomotiv Plovdiv.	Exact time unknown	4	
29 May 2015	23	DF	(Mali) Mamoutou Coulibaly	Unspecified injury	Occurred during training.	Exact time unknown	1	

As of

=== Home attendances ===
Correct as of match played on 26 May 2015.
Win Draw Loss

Comp	Date	Score	Opponent	Attendance
A PFG	26 July 2014	0–0	Ludogorets	3,790
A PFG	9 August 2014	0–1	Marek	800
A PFG	23 August 2014	3–0	Lokomotiv Plovdiv	750
A PFG	13 September 2014	1–1	CSKA	4,500
A PFG	28 September 2014	0–1	Lokomotiv Sofia	1,460
A PFG	19 October 2014	4–0	Beroe	1,440
Bulgarian Cup	28 October 2014	2–0	Slavia	380
A PFG	2 November 2014	2–1	Botev Plovdiv	2,430
A PFG	22 November 2014	0–3	Litex	1,190
A PFG	6 December 2014	1–0	Levski	2,600
Bulgarian Cup	21 February 2015	1–0	Lokomotiv Gorna Oryahovitsa	1,340
A PFG	27 February 2015	2–0	Slavia	970
A PFG	13 March 2015	1–0	Haskovo	440
A PFG	20 March 2015	2–0	Marek	380
Bulgarian Cup	7 April 2015	5–1	Lokomotiv Plovdiv	1,600
A PFG	10 April 2015	2–0	Haskovo	430
A PFG	19 April 2015	1–1	Slavia	1,280
A PFG	9 May 2015	0–2	Levski	4,710
A PFG	26 May 2015	1–2	Lokomotiv Plovdiv	220
			**Total attendance**	**30,710**
			**Total league attendance**	**27,390**
			**Average attendance**	**1,616**
			**Average league attendance**	**1,712**

Source: Match reports in Competitions

== Club ==
=== Coaching staff ===
Position	Staff
Manager	(Bulgaria) Aleksandar Stankov (until 18 August), then (Bulgaria) Nikola Spasov
Assistant First Team Coach	(North Macedonia) Zhikitsa Tasevski (until 18 August)
Assistant First Team Coach	(Bulgaria) Emanuil Lukanov
Goalkeeper Coach	(Bulgaria) Stoyan Stavrev
First Team Fitness Coach	(Bulgaria) Veselin Markov
Individual Team Fitness Coach	(Bulgaria) Viktor Bumbalov
Medical Director	(Bulgaria) Dr. Petko Atev
Academy Manager	(Bulgaria) Hristina Dimitrova

Last updated: 19 August 2014
Source: Cherno More

=== Other information ===
Owner/Chairman	(Bulgaria) Marin Mitev
Chief Executive	(Bulgaria) Marin Marinov
Sporting Director	(Bulgaria) Todor Velikov
Ground (capacity and dimensions)	Ticha Stadium (12,500 / 103x67 metres)

Updated to match played 1 August 2012
Source: Cherno More
