= Mihail Venkov =

Bulgarian footballer

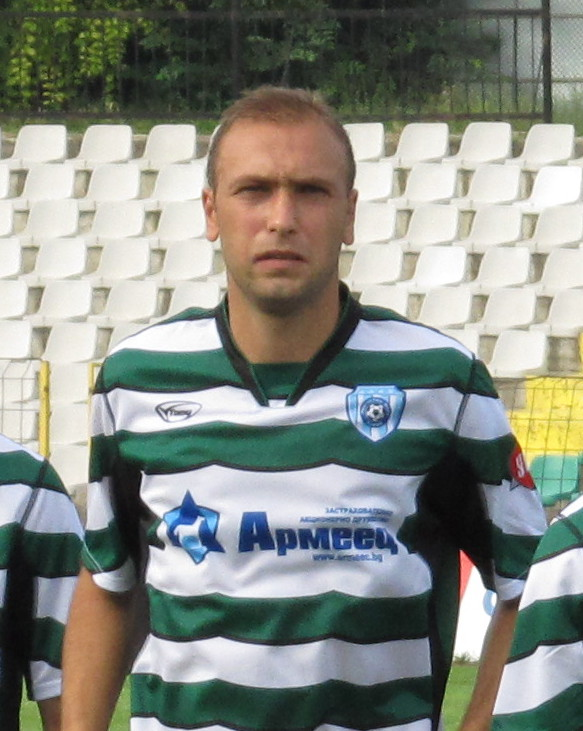

Personal information
- Full name: Mihail Angelov Venkov
- Date of birth: 28 July 1983 (age 43)
- Place of birth: Sofia, Bulgaria
- Height: 1.81 m (5 ft 11 1/2 in)
- Position: Left back

Youth career
- 1990–2001: Septemvri Sofia

Senior career*
Years	Team	Apps	(Gls)
2002–2011	Litex Lovech	138	(2)
2003–2004	→ Belite Orli (loan)	10	(0)
2011–2012	Lokomotiv Plovdiv	28	(3)
2012–2013	CSKA Sofia	18	(2)
2013–2017	Cherno More	124	(1)
2017	Slavia Sofia	5	(0)
2018	Kyzylzhar	14	(0)
2018	Chernomorets Balchik	17	(2)
2019–2020	Dobrudzha Dobrich	24	(0)
2020–2021	Shumen 2007	7	(0)
2021–2023	Volov Shumen	30	(2)
Total		415	(12)

International career
2004–2008	Bulgaria	7	(0)

Managerial career
- 2024–2025: Botev Novi Pazar
- * Club domestic league appearances and goals as of 15 June 2020

Mihail Angelov Venkov (Bulgarian: Михаил Ангелов Венков; born 28 July 1983) is a Bulgarian retired footballer who played as a left back, and now a manager.

== Career ==
Venkov was raised in Septemvri Sofia's youth teams, then he signed with Litex. In 2004, he was loaned for six months to Belite orli Pleven and played in the B PFG. During the 2009/2010 and 2010/2011 seasons he lost his place in the first team for Litex and eventually was transferred to Lokomotiv Plovdiv in July 2011. On 15 March 2012, Venkov scored a last-minute goal against Levski Sofia in a 1/4 final match of the Bulgarian Cup to level the score at 1–1 and send the game into extra time. The team from Plovdiv eventually won 2–1.

=== CSKA Sofia ===
During the summer of 2012 (following a change of ownership in Lokomotiv Plovdiv), Venkov signed a contract with CSKA Sofia, but was initially unable to play in official matches for the team due to a transfer prohibition imposed on the "redmen". The ban was lifted in mid September 2012 and Venkov made his official debut on 22 September, in the 0–1 away loss against Ludogorets Razgrad. He scored his first goal for CSKA from a header against Slavia Sofia in 0–2 away win. Venkov made his first appearance in The Eternal Derby on 20 October 2012, playing the full 90 minutes of the 1–0 win over Levski Sofia.

=== Cherno More ===
On 8 July 2013, Venkov signed a two-year deal with Cherno More Varna. He made his league debut in a 1–0 away loss against Chernomorets Burgas on 19 July, playing the full 90 minutes.

On 7 April 2015, Venkov scored his first goal for Cherno More in the 48th minute of a Bulgarian Cup match against Lokomotiv Plovdiv. Cherno More won 5–1. Having been appointed vice-captain for the 2014–15 season, Venkov was promoted to club captain after the departure of former captain Kiril Kotev in May 2015. On 23 May, Venkov signed a one-year contract extension with Cherno More until 30 June 2016. A week later, he received his first major honor with the Sailors, as he captained the team that eliminated Levski Sofia 2–1 in the 2015 Bulgarian Cup final.

On 29 May 2017, Venkov's contract was terminated by mutual consent.

=== Slavia Sofia ===
In June 2017, Venkov joined Slavia.

=== Chernomorets Balchik ===
On 25 July 2018, following a short stint at Kazakhstan Premier League side Kyzylzhar, Venkov returned to Bulgaria, joining Chernomorets Balchik.

== Career statistics ==
As of 20 January 2018

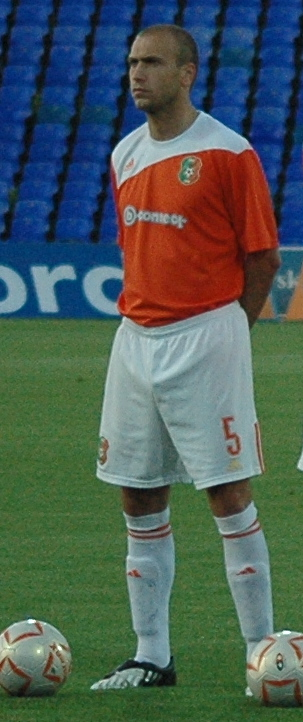
Venkov playing for Litex

Season	Club	League	League		Domestic Cup		Continental		Total	
Season	Club	League	Apps	Goals	Apps	Goals	Apps	Goals	Apps	Goals
2001–02	Litex Lovech	A Group	2	0	1	0	0	0	3	0
2002–03	Litex Lovech	A Group	1	0	2	0	0	0	3	0
2003–04	Belite orli	B Group	10	0	2	0	0	0	12	0
2003–04	Litex Lovech	A Group	4	0	0	0	0	0	4	0
2004–05	Litex Lovech	A Group	29	0	2	0	3	0	35	0
2005–06	Litex Lovech	A Group	13	0	1	0	6	1	20	1
2006–07	Litex Lovech	A Group	16	0	1	0	4	0	21	0
2007–08	Litex Lovech	A Group	27	0	5	0	6	0	38	0
2008–09	Litex Lovech	A Group	23	0	4	0	4	0	31	0
2009–10	Litex Lovech	A Group	10	1	?	?	1	0	11	1
2010–11	Litex Lovech	A Group	12	0	1	0	1	0	14	0
2011–12	Lokomotiv Plovdiv	A Group	28	3	4	1	0	0	32	4
2012–13	Lokomotiv Plovdiv	A Group	0	0	1	0	2	0	3	0
2012–13	CSKA Sofia	A Group	18	2	2	0	0	0	20	2
2013–14	Cherno More	A Group	35	0	3	0	0	0	38	0
2014–15	Cherno More	A Group	28	0	7	1	0	0	35	1
2015–16	Cherno More	A Group	33	0	2	0	2	0	37	0
2016–17	Cherno More	First League	28	1	2	1	0	0	30	2
2017–18	Slavia Sofia	First League	5	0	1	0	0	0	6	0
Career Total			311	7	39	3	29	1	379	11

== International career ==
Between 2002 and 2005 Venkov played for Bulgaria national under-21 football team. Since 2004 he has been playing for the Bulgaria national football team. He has currently been capped seven times for Bulgaria. In October 2012, following a long absence from international duty, he was recalled to the national side by manager Luboslav Penev for two 2014 World Cup qualifiers – against Denmark and the Czech Republic, but remained an unused substitute in these games. In February 2015, following the refusal of a number of Bulgarian and foreign clubs to release players for national team duty, Venkov again became part of the roster, being called up by new manager Ivaylo Petev to participate in a non-official friendly match against Romania. On 7 February, he played over the course of the whole second half of the match that ended in a 0:0 draw.

International appearances and goals
#	Date	Venue	Opponent	Result	Goal	Competition
1	17 November 2004	Baku, Azerbaijan	Azerbaijan	0–0	0	Friendly
2	29 November 2004	Cairo, Egypt	Egypt	1–1	0	Friendly
3	8 October 2005	Sofia, Bulgaria	Hungary	2–0	0	2006 FIFA World Cup qualification
4	12 October 2005	Ta' Qali, Malta	Malta	1–1	0	2006 FIFA World Cup qualification
5	6 February 2008	Belfast, Northern Ireland	Northern Ireland	0–1	0	Friendly
6	26 March 2008	Sofia, Bulgaria	Finland	2–1	0	Friendly
7	19 November 2008	Belgrade, Serbia	Serbia	6–1	0	Friendly

== Honours ==
=== Club ===
Litex Lovech

- A Group (2): 2009–10, 2010–11
- Bulgarian Cup (2): 2007–08, 2008–09

Cherno More

- Bulgarian Cup: 2014–15
- Bulgarian Supercup: 2015

=== Individual ===
- PFC Cherno More Fans' player of the year – 2014
