= 2014 Bulgarian Cup final =

- Event: 2013–14 Bulgarian Cup

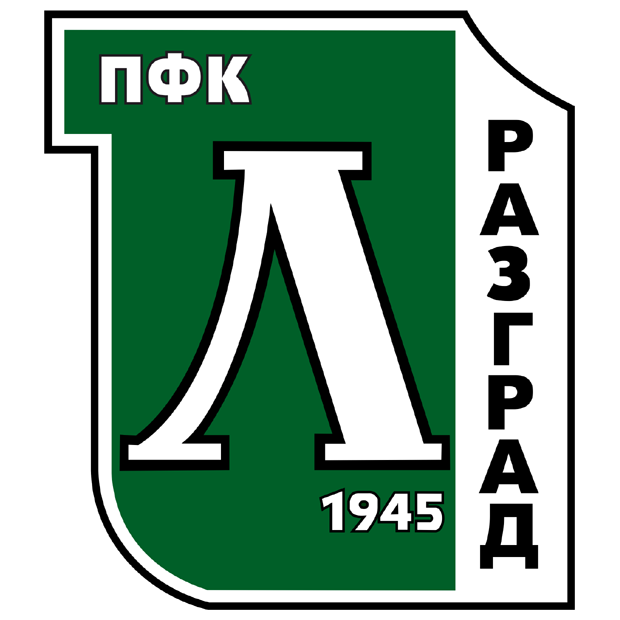
Botev	Ludogorets
0	1
- Date: 15 May 2014
- Venue: Lazur Stadium, Burgas
- Man of the Match: Roman Bezjak
- Referee: Georgi Yordanov (Gabrovo)
- Attendance: 13,250

The 2014 Bulgarian Cup final was the 74th final of the Bulgarian Cup. The match, contested by Botev Plovdiv and Ludogorets Razgrad, took place on 15 May 2014 at Lazur Stadium in Burgas. Ludogorets won the final 1–0, claiming their second ever Bulgarian Cup title.

== Route to the final ==
Botev			Round	Ludogorets
Opponent	Result	Legs		Opponent	Result	Legs
Neftochimic Burgas	9–0	6–0 home; 3–0 away	Round of 32	Dunav Ruse	6–2	4–1 home; 2–1 away
Cherno More	1–0	0–0 away; 1–0 home	Round of 16	Beroe Stara Zagora	3–2	2–1 home; 1–1 away
Levski Sofia	3–3 (a)	1–3 away; 2–0 home	Quarter-finals	Litex Lovech	4–2	2–1 away; 2–1 home
Lokomotiv Sofia	4–1	3–1 home; 1–0 away	Semi-finals	Lokomotiv Plovdiv	2–1	2–0 home; 0–1 away

== Match ==
=== Details ===
15 May 2014
19:15 EEST

Botev Plovdiv	0–1	Ludogorets Razgrad
		Bezjak 58'

Lazur Stadium, Burgas
Attendance: 13,250
Referee: Georgi Yordanov (Gabrovo)

Botev	Ludogorets

GK	1	(Poland) Adam Stachowiak
DF	11	(Bulgaria) Yordan Hristov (c)
DF	83	(Curaçao) Civard Sprockel
DF	4	(Romania) Srdjan Luchin	(yellow card) 78'
DF	14	(Bulgaria) Veselin Minev	(yellow card) 24'
MF	16	(Czech Republic) Tomáš Jirsák	(yellow card) 48'
MF	7	(Bulgaria) Marian Ognyanov		(substituted off) 75'
MF	8	(Romania) Alexandru Curtean		(substituted off) 62'
MF	17	(Madagascar) Anicet Abel
FW	3	(Republic of the Congo) Férébory Doré	(yellow card) 52'	(substituted off) 88'
FW	9	(Tunisia) Hamza Younés	(yellow card) 61'
Substitutes:
GK	27	(Bulgaria) Iliya Nikolov
DF	6	(Romania) Alexandru Benga
MF	10	(Brazil) Vander Vieira	(red card) 90+2'	(substituted in) 75'
FW	15	(Netherlands) Luís Pedro		(substituted in) 62'
FW	19	(Bulgaria) Ivan Tsvetkov		(substituted in) 88'
DF	28	(Bulgaria) Filip Filipov
MF	88	(Bulgaria) Georgi Sarmov
Manager:
(Bulgaria) Stanimir Stoilov

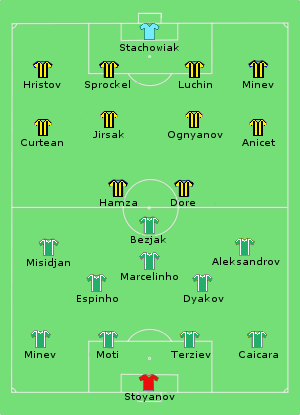

GK	21	(Bulgaria) Vladislav Stoyanov
DF	80	(Brazil) Júnior Caiçara	(yellow card) 80'
DF	55	(Bulgaria) Georgi Terziev
DF	27	(Romania) Cosmin Moți
DF	25	(Bulgaria) Yordan Minev
MF	18	(Bulgaria) Svetoslav Dyakov (c)
MF	8	(Portugal) Fábio Espinho	(yellow card) 32'
MF	7	(Bulgaria) Mihail Aleksandrov	(yellow card) 29'
MF	93	(Netherlands) Virgil Misidjan		(substituted off) 72'
MF	84	(Brazil) Marcelinho		(substituted off) 88'
FW	9	(Slovenia) Roman Bezjak	(yellow card) 74'	(substituted off) 90'
Substitutes:
GK	91	(Bulgaria) Ivan Čvorović
MF	10	(Colombia) Sebastián Hernández
FW	11	(Brazil) Juninho Quixadá		(substituted in) 90'
DF	15	(Bulgaria) Aleksandar Aleksandrov
MF	23	(Bulgaria) Hristo Zlatinski		(substituted in) 88'
DF	77	(Portugal) Vitinha
MF	95	(Netherlands) Jeroen Lumu		(substituted in) 72'
Manager:
(Bulgaria) Stoycho Stoev

MAN OF THE MATCH

- Roman Bezjak

MATCH OFFICIALS

- Assistant referees:
  - Krum Stoilov
  - Ivo Kolev
- Fourth official: Ivaylo Stoyanov

MATCH RULES

- 90 minutes.
- 30 minutes of extra-time if necessary.
- Penalty shoot-out if scores still level.
- Seven named substitutes.
- Maximum of three substitutions.

== Supporter disturbances ==
The match was affected by a number of disruptions due to unruly spectators. On the one-hour mark, shortly after Bezjak had opened the scoring, the advertisement boards near the stadium sector with the Botev ultras caught fire, necessitating the interruption of the match for 17 minutes until fire brigades could enter the pitch and extinguish the flames. On two occasions (around the 60th minute and following Vander Vieira's dismissal for a dangerous tackle on Mihail Aleksandrov), small groups of Botev supporters attempted pitch invasions, but were successfully restrained by footballers Veselin Minev, Tomáš Jirsák and Adam Stachowiak as well as the arriving police officers. A number of objects were also thrown by fans of the "canaries", with one of them hitting Ludogorets defender Georgi Terziev. Officials affiliated with the Razgrad team have been critical of the general preparations prior to the match and the insufficient policing. Botev owner Tzvetan Vassilev promised to compensate Chernomorets Burgas in full for all the stadium damage inflicted.

== See also ==
- 2013–14 A Group
