= Yanaki Smirnov =

Bulgarian footballer (born 1992)

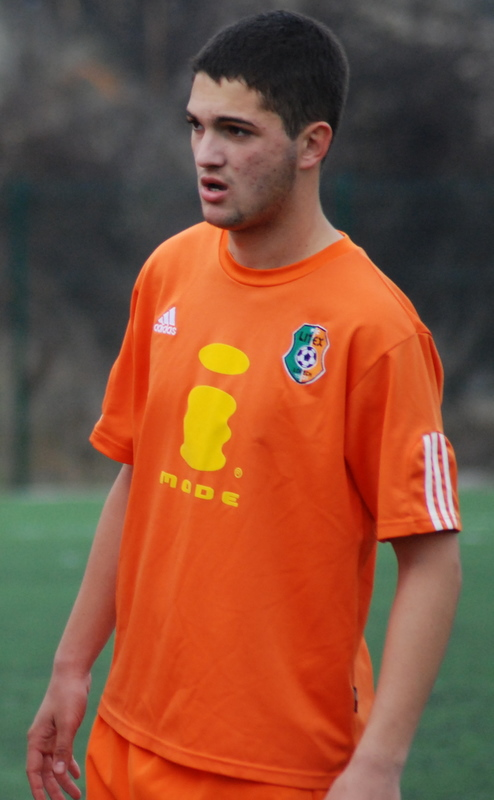
- Smirnov with Litex Lovech in 2009

Personal information
- Full name: Yanaki Valentinov Smirnov
- Date of birth: 20 December 1992 (age 33)
- Place of birth: Varna, Bulgaria
- Positions: Winger; forward

Team information
- Current team: Botev novi Pazar
- Number: 10

Youth career
- 1998–1999: Panathinaikos
- 1999–2005: Spartak Varna
- 2005–2006: Vilafranca
- 2006–2011: Litex

Senior career*
Years	Team	Apps	(Gls)
2010–2011	Litex	0	(0)
2011	→ Spartak Varna (loan)	9	(1)
2012	Spartak Varna	7	(0)
2013	Neftochimic 1986	3	(0)
2013–2014	Spartak Varna	23	(2)
2014–2015	Lokomotiv GO	26	(23)
2015–2016	Ludogorets II	28	(11)
2015–2016	Ludogorets	2	(0)
2016	→ Lokomotiv GO (loan)	8	(1)
2017–2018	Botev Vratsa	26	(3)
2018	Dobrudzha	17	(1)
2019	Chernomorets Balchik	12	(1)
2019	Pomorie	7	(1)
2019–2021	Spartak Varna	33	(11)
2021–2022	Spartak Varna II	24	(10)
2022–2024	Dorostol		
2024–	Botev novi Pazar		

Managerial career
- 2021–2023: Spartak Varna II (assistant)
- * Club domestic league appearances and goals as of 19 October 2022

Yanaki Smirnov (Bulgarian: Янаки Смирнов; born 20 December 1992) is a Bulgarian footballer who plays as a forward for Botev novi Pazar.

== Career ==
=== Early career ===
Yanaki moved to Greece with his family where he started his career in the local Panathinaikos. A year later his family returned to his hometown of Varna, where he joined Spartak Varna's academy. He spent one year in Hristo Stoichkov's academy at the Vilafranca football club. After that he joined Litex Lovech academy. He later moved again to Spartak Varna.

=== Lokomotiv Gorna Oryahovitsa ===
In the summer of 2014, Smirnov signed with the B Group team Lokomotiv Gorna Oryahovitsa. He scored a goal in his debut for Loko against Loko Mezdra. He scored 13 goals in his first 9 matches. He became the top goalscorer of B Group with 23 goals scored in 26 matches.

=== Ludogorets Razgrad ===
On 7 July 2015, Smirnov signed a contract with Ludogorets Razgrad II, the B team of Bulgarian champions Ludogorets, who play in Bulgaria's 2nd league B Group. He chose Ludogorets team over CSKA Sofia. He made his debut for Ludogorets II on 25 July 2015 in a match against Dunav Ruse.

On 23 September 2015 he made his debut for Ludogorets Razgrad in a match for the Bulgarian Cup against Lokomotiv 1929 Mezdra, scoring a goal in the 5:0 win.

On 22 May 2015 he made his complete debut in the A Group for Ludogorets in a match against Beroe Stara Zagora.

==== Loan to Lokomotiv Gorna Oryahovitsa ====
On 17 June 2016 Smirnov joined Lokomotiv Gorna Oryahovitsa for the second time, but now on loan for a season. His loan was ended on 28 December 2016 and he returned it Ludogorets doubles. A week after he was released from Ludogorets.

=== Botev Vratsa ===
On 11 April 2017, Smirnov signed with Botev Vratsa. In May 2018, his contract was terminated by mutual consent.

=== Dobrudzha Dobrich ===
In June 2018, Smirnov joined Dobrudzha Dobrich.

== Career statistics ==
=== Club ===
As of 30 December 2016

Club performance			League		Cup		Continental		Other		Total	
Club	League	Season	Apps	Goals	Apps	Goals	Apps	Goals	Apps	Goals	Apps	Goals
Bulgaria			League		Bulgarian Cup		Europe		Other (Note: Includes Bulgarian Supercup matches.)		Total	
Spartak 1918	B Group	2011–12	9	1	0	0	–		–		9	1
Spartak 1918	B Group	2012–13	7	0	0	0	–		–		7	0
Neftochimic Burgas	B Group	2012–13	3	0	0	0	0	0	–		3	0
Spartak 1918	B Group	2013–14	23	2	2	0	–		–		24	2
Spartak 1918	Total		39	3	2	0	0	0	0	0	42	2
Lokomotiv GO	B Group	2014–15	26	23	5	1	–		–		31	24
Lokomotiv GO	Total		26	23	5	1	0	0	0	0	31	24
Ludogorets Razgrad II	B Group	2015–16	28	11	–		–		–		28	11
Ludogorets Razgrad	A Group	2015–16	2	0	1	1	0	0	0	0	3	1
Lokomotiv Gorna Oryahovitsa (loan)	Parva Liga	2016–17	8	1	1	0	–		–		9	1
Career statistics			106	38	9	2	0	0	0	0	115	40

== Honours ==
=== Club ===
Litex Lovech

- A Group. (1): 2010–11

Neftochimic Burgas

- B Group. (1): 2012–13

=== Individual ===
- Bulgarian B Football Group – Top scorer: 2014–15 (23 goals)
