= Aleksandar Yovchev =

Bulgarian footballer

Personal information
- Date of birth: 27 October 1996 (age 30)
- Place of birth: Varna, Bulgaria
- Positions: Right back; defensive midfielder

Team information
- Current team: Botev Novi Pazar
- Number: 6

Youth career
- –2015: Cherno More

Senior career*
Years	Team	Apps	(Gls)
2015	Cherno More	1	(0)
2015–2017	Dobrudzha	51	(7)
2018–2020	Spartak Varna	51	(3)
2021–2024	Spartak Varna II		
2024–	Botev Novi Pazar		
- * Club domestic league appearances and goals as of 8 February 2025

Aleksandar Yovchev (Bulgarian: Александър Йовчев; born 27 October 1996) is a Bulgarian footballer who plays as a defender for Botev Novi Pazar.

== Career ==
In January 2014, Yovchev was included in Cherno More's 25-man squad for their training camp in Turkey. Aleksandar made his first team début in a 2–2 away draw against Slavia (Bulgarian Cup 1/8 final) on 3 December 2014. He made his full league début in a 1–2 home defeat against Lokomotiv Plovdiv on 26 May 2015, playing as left back.

On 17 January 2018 Yovchev returned his hometown to play for Spartak Varna.

== Career statistics ==
As of 26 July 2015

Club	Season	League		Cup		Continental		Total	
Club	Season	Apps	Goals	Apps	Goals	Apps	Goals	Apps	Goals
Cherno More	2014–15	1	0	1	0	—	—	2	0
Cherno More	Total	1	0	1	0	0	0	2	0
Dobrudzha Dobrich	2015–16	15	1	1	0	—	—	16	1
Dobrudzha Dobrich	Total	15	1	1	0	0	0	16	1
