= Zhivko Atanasov =

Bulgarian footballer (born 1991)

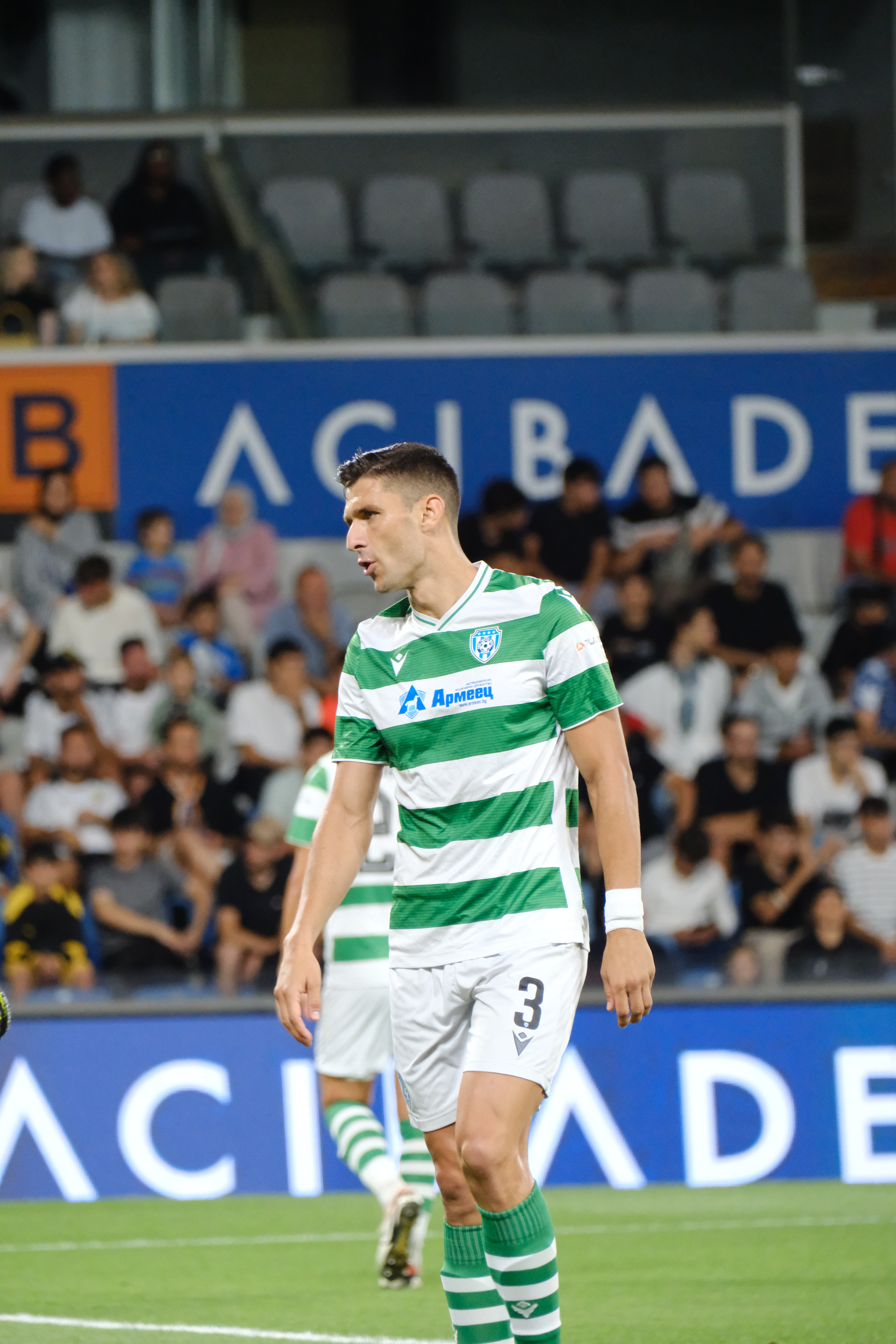

Personal information
- Full name: Zhivko Stanislavov Atanasov
- Date of birth: 3 February 1991 (age 35)
- Place of birth: Gorni Bogrov, Bulgaria
- Height: 1.90 m (6 ft 3 in)
- Position: Centre-back

Team information
- Current team: Cherno More
- Number: 3

Youth career
- –2010: Levski Sofia

Senior career*
Years	Team	Apps	(Gls)
2010–2012	Levski Sofia	0	(0)
2010–2011	→ Chavdar BS (loan)	35	(0)
2011	→ Septemvri Simitli (loan)	11	(0)
2012–2015	Cherno More	73	(2)
2015	Slavia Sofia	8	(0)
2016–2017	Juve Stabia	26	(1)
2017–2019	Viterbese	68	(6)
2020	Catanzaro	10	(0)
2020–2021	Levski Sofia	28	(4)
2021–	Cherno More	171	(9)

International career^{‡}
2023–2025	Bulgaria	13	(0)
- * Club domestic league appearances and goals as of 19:08, 8 November 2026 (UTC) ‡ National team caps and goals as of 23:36, 20 March 2025 (UTC)

Zhivko Atanasov (Bulgarian: Живко Атанасов; born 3 February 1991) is a Bulgarian professional footballer who plays as a centre-back for First League club Cherno More Varna.

== Club career ==
Atanasov began his career with Levski Sofia.

In the winter of 2012, Atanasov impressed Cherno More manager Stefan Genov as a trialist during Cherno More's training camp in Turkey. On 17 February 2012, he signed a two-and-a-half-year contract. Atanasov made his debut on 4 March, starting against Levski Sofia at Georgi Asparuhov Stadium in an A Group fixture, playing the full 90 minutes at centre-back in a 2–1 defeat. He scored his first Cherno More goal on 18 April, opening the scoring in a 7–1 home win over Kaliakra Kavarna.

When Aleksandar Aleksandrov was transferred in January 2014, Atanasov formed a partnership with Kiril Kotev in the centre of defence and has become an established first team player.

On 16 January 2020 he signed a 1.5-year contract with Serie C side Catanzaro.

On 4 August 2020, Atanasov returned to his boyhood club Levski Sofia on a 2-year deal. On 14 June 2021, he terminated his contract with Levski due to financial reasons.

On 16 June 2021, Atanasov returned to former club, Cherno More, on a two-year contract.

== International career ==
On 16 November 2023, Atanasov earned his first cap for the national team after coming on as a late first half substitute for Ivaylo Chochev in a 2–2 home draw against Hungary in a Euro 2024 qualifier.

== Family ==
Atanasov's mother, Yordanka Donkova, is a former hurdling athlete notable for winning an Olympic gold medal and bronze medal as well as 9 medals at European indoor and outdoor championships.

== Career statistics ==
=== Club ===
As of match played 14 September 2026

Club	League	Season	League		Cup		Continental		Other		Total	
Club	League	Season	Apps	Goals	Apps	Goals	Apps	Goals	Apps	Goals	Apps	Goals
Cherno More	First League	2011–12	15	1	0	0	—		—		15	1
Cherno More	First League	2012–13	18	0	3	0	—		—		21	0
Cherno More	First League	2013–14	19	1	3	0	—		—		22	1
Cherno More	First League	2014–15	21	0	7	1	—		—		28	1
Cherno More	Total		73	2	13	1	0	0	0	0	86	3
Slavia Sofia	First League	2015–16	8	0	1	0	—		—		9	0
Juve Stabia	Serie C	2015–16	2	0	0	0	—		—		2	0
Juve Stabia	Serie C	2016–17	21	1	2	0	—		2	0	25	1
Juve Stabia	Serie C	2017–18	1	0	2	0	—		—		3	0
Juve Stabia	Total		24	1	4	0	0	0	2	0	30	1
Levski Sofia	First League	2020–21	28	4	2	0	—		—		30	4
Cherno More	First League	2021–22	29	1	2	0	—		—		31	1
Cherno More	First League	2022–23	31	1	5	0	—		—		36	1
Cherno More	First League	2023–24	33	4	1	0	—		—		34	4
Cherno More	First League	2024–25	33	2	4	0	2	0	—		39	2
Cherno More	First League	2025–26	32	1	1	0	2	0	—		35	1
Cherno More	First League	2026–27	9	0	0	0	—		—		9	0
Cherno More	Total		167	9	13	0	4	0	0	0	184	9
Career total			238	15	27	1	4	0	0	0	269	16

=== International ===
As of match played 18 November 2024

Appearances and goals by national team and year
National team	Year	Apps	Goals
Bulgaria	2023	2	0
Bulgaria	2024	10	0
Bulgaria	2025	1	0
Total		13	0

== Honours ==
=== Club ===
Cherno More

- Bulgarian Cup: 2014–15
