= FC Botev Novi Pazar =

Bulgarian football club

Botev Novi Pazar
- Full name: Football Club Botev Novi Pazar
- Founded: 1922; 104 years ago
- Ground: Gradski Stadium, Novi Pazar
- Capacity: 8,000
- Manager: Mihail Venkov
- League: North-East Third League
- 2023–24: ARFG Shumen, 1st (Promoted)
- Website: https://botevnp.eu/
Home colours	Away colours

FC Botev (Bulgarian: ФК Ботев) is a Bulgarian football club based in Novi Pazar, Shumen Province, which competes in the North-East Third League, the third division of Bulgarian football.

== Honours ==
- A RFG Shumen:
  - Winners (1): 2023–24

== Current squad ==
As of 9 September 2024

Note: Flags indicate national team as defined under FIFA eligibility rules; some limited exceptions apply. Players may hold more than one non-FIFA nationality.

No.	Pos.	Nation	Player
2	MF	BUL	Valentin Kyuchuktepe
3	MF	BUL	Mitko Mitkov
4	MF	BUL	Aleksandar Trendafilov
5	DF	BUL	Hristo Dimitrov
6	MF	BUL	Aleksandar Yovchev
7	MF	UKR	Dmytro Zhimchuk
9	FW	BUL	Yanaki Smirnov
10	MF	BUL	Dimitar Dimitrov
11	FW	UKR	Oleksiy Mazhynskyi (on loan from Fratria)
12	GK	BUL	Simeon Simeonov

No.	Pos.	Nation	Player
13	FW	BUL	Nikolay Pantev
14	DF	BUL	Banko Bankov
15	DF	BUL	Mert Vadet
17	MF	BUL	Yordan Ivanov
18	DF	BUL	Ayan Hasan
20	MF	BUL	Nikola Iliev
23	DF	BUL	Rostislav Mikov
24	FW	BUL	Daniel Kostadinov
25	FW	BUL	Svetoslav Pavlov
