= Ivan Kokonov =

Bulgarian footballer (born 1991)

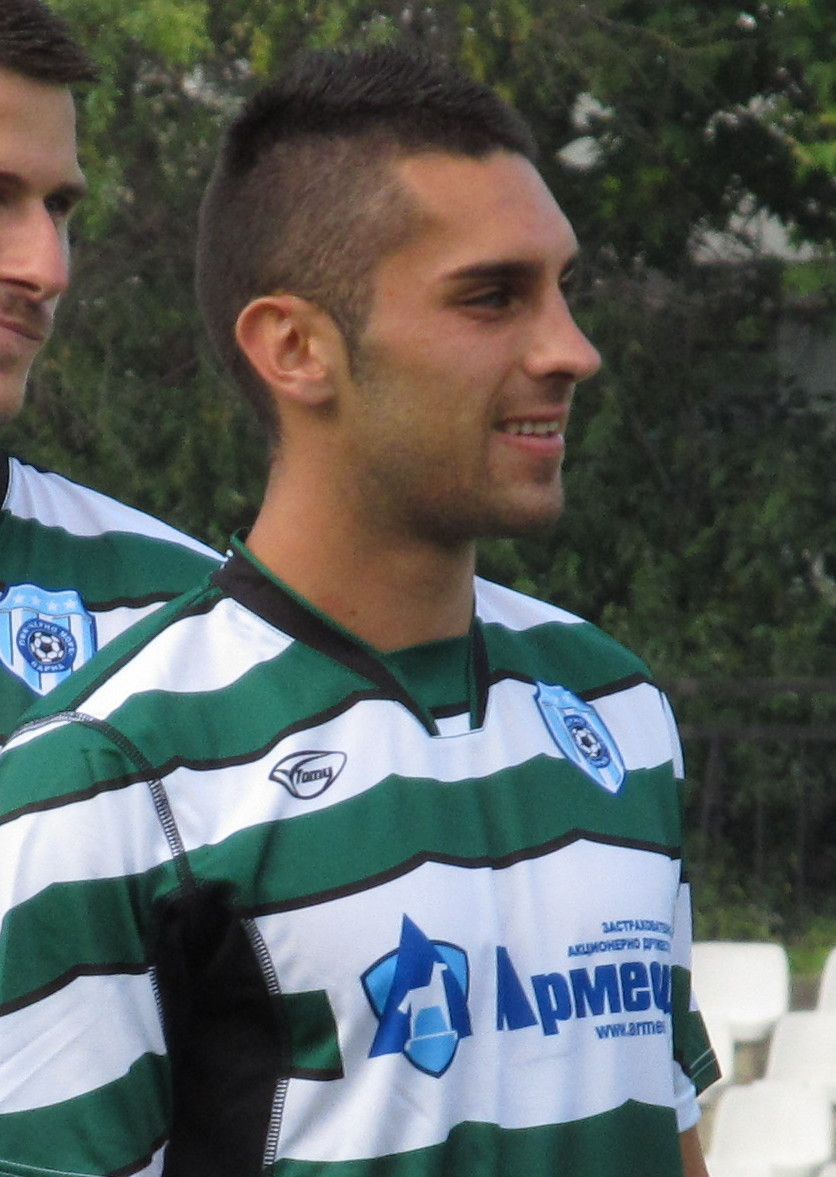

Personal information
- Full name: Ivan Stoyanov Kokonov
- Date of birth: 17 August 1991 (age 35)
- Place of birth: Petrich, Bulgaria
- Height: 1.80 m (5 ft 11 in)
- Position: Winger

Team information
- Current team: Yantra Gabrovo
- Number: 21

Youth career
- Belasitsa Petrich
- Pirin Blagoevgrad
- Vekta Plovdiv

Senior career*
Years	Team	Apps	(Gls)
2009–2010	Sliven	18	(0)
2011–2013	Slavia Sofia	8	(0)
2011–2012	→ Botev Vratsa (loan)	40	(8)
2013	→ Botev Vratsa (loan)	14	(1)
2013–2015	Cherno More	57	(8)
2015	Beroe Stara Zagora	4	(0)
2016	Montana	14	(1)
2016–2017	Cherno More	37	(3)
2017–2018	Montana	22	(9)
2018	Dunav Ruse	20	(1)
2019–2024	Arda Kardzhali	157	(25)
2024	Etar Veliko Tarnovo	21	(10)
2025–2026	Montana	44	(6)
2026–	Yantra Gabrovo	14	(2)
- * Club domestic league appearances and goals as of 31 October 2026

Ivan Kokonov (Bulgarian: Иван Коконов; born 17 August 1991) is a Bulgarian professional footballer who plays as a winger for Second League club Yantra Gabrovo.

== Career ==
Born in Petrich, Kokonov started his career in his hometown with Belasitsa Petrich. Then he played for Pirin Blagoevgrad, before joining Vekta Plovdiv as a youth player.

He made his professional debut for Sliven 2000, during 2009–10 season, on 13 April 2010 in a 2–0 away loss against Chernomorets Burgas, coming on as a substitute for Nikolay Dimitrov.

On 12 September 2017, Kokonov signed with Montana until the end of the season.

On 11 June 2018, Kokonov joined Dunav Ruse.

== Honours ==
Cherno More

- Bulgarian Cup: 2014–15
