= Toni Stoichkov =

Bulgarian footballer

Personal information
- Full name: Toni Ivanov Stoichkov
- Date of birth: 15 May 1995 (age 31)
- Place of birth: Sofia, Bulgaria
- Position: Centre back

Team information
- Current team: Marek Dupnitsa
- Number: 3

Youth career
- –2014: CSKA Sofia
- 2015: Cherno More

Senior career*
Years	Team	Apps	(Gls)
2012–2014	CSKA Sofia	1	(0)
2015	Cherno More	1	(0)
2015	Botev Ihtiman	14	(0)
2016	Sofia 2010	0	(0)
2016	Sevlievo		
2017	Bansko	9	(0)
2017–2019	CSKA 1948	28	(2)
2019–2020	Minyor Pernik	21	(1)
2021–	Marek Dupnitsa	23	(0)

International career
2011–2012	Bulgaria U17		
- * Club domestic league appearances and goals as of 20 December 2021

Toni Stoichkov (Bulgarian: Тони Стоичков; born 10 November 1995) is a Bulgarian footballer who plays as a central defender for Marek Dupnitsa.

== Career ==
In 2012, he joined CSKA Sofia's first team from the youth team.

In January 2017, Stoichkov signed for Bansko. He moved to CSKA 1948 on 14 June 2017.

== Career statistics ==
=== Club ===
As of 26 May 2015

Club	Season	League		Bulgarian Cup		Europe		Total	
Club	Season	Apps	Goals	Apps	Goals	Apps	Goals	Apps	Goals
CSKA	2012–13	1	0	0	0	0	0	1	0
CSKA	2013–14	0	0	0	0	0	0	0	0
CSKA	2014–15	0	0	0	0	0	0	0	0
CSKA	Total	1	0	0	0	0	0	1	0
Cherno More	2014–15	1	0	0	0	0	0	1	0
Cherno More	Total	1	0	0	0	0	0	1	0
Career totals		2	0	0	0	0	0	2	0
