= Sebastián Hernández =

Colombian footballer (born 1986)

Personal information
- Full name: Sebastián Hernández Mejía
- Date of birth: 2 October 1986 (age 40)
- Place of birth: Medellín, Colombia
- Height: 1.78 m (5 ft 10 in)
- Position: Attacking midfielder

Team information
- Current team: Atlético Huila
- Number: 7

Youth career
- Deportes Quindío

Senior career*
Years	Team	Apps	(Gls)
2004–2005	Deportes Quindío		
2005–2006	Millonarios		
2007	Emelec		
2007–2008	Deportivo Cali	17	(1)
2008–2009	Deportes Quindío	35	(10)
2009–2010	Once Caldas	25	(3)
2010–2011	Deportivo Táchira	31	(4)
2011–2012	Atlético Huila	39	(6)
2012	Independiente Medellín	24	(2)
2013–2015	Ludogorets Razgrad	24	(6)
2015	→ Cherno More (loan)	11	(3)
2015–2016	Boluspor	16	(1)
2016–2019	Atlético Junior	103	(7)
2020–2021	Once Caldas	29	(1)
2021–2022	Independiente Medellín	9	(0)
2022–	Atlético Huila	83	(3)

International career
2002–2003	Colombia U17	9	(4)
2005	Colombia U20	6	(2)
- * Club domestic league appearances and goals as of 15 July 2023

Sebastián Hernández Mejía (born 2 October 1986) is a Colombian footballer who plays as an attacking midfielder for Atlético Huila.

== Career ==
=== Early career ===
Hernández started his professional career in 2004 for Deportes Quindío. He also played for Millonarios before joining Ecuadorian Serie A side Emelec in 2007.

Hernández then went on to play in his country for Deportivo Cali, his first club Deportes Quindío and then Once Caldas.

=== Deportivo Táchira ===
In 2010, Hernández was signed by Venezuelan Primera División club Deportivo Táchira with whom he won the 2010 Torneo Apertura. In the first half of 2011, he played six games for Táchira in the Copa Libertadores.

=== Atletico Huila ===
In the summer of 2011, he joined Atletico Huila. He left after the 2012 Apertura.

=== Independiente Medellín ===
In July 2012, Hernández joined Independiente Medellín. He made his debut in a 1–0 home win over Deportivo Pasto on 29 July, playing the full 90 minutes. He made 24 appearances and scored 2 goals in the 2012 season. His first goal came on 22 October, in a 2–1 away loss against Deportes Tolima.

=== Ludogorets Razgrad ===
On 18 January 2013, Hernández joined Bulgarian club Ludogorets Razgrad. He was given the number 10 jersey. On 3 August 2013, he scored his first goal for the club in a 3–0 victory against Slavia Sofia. On 2 March 2014, he scored two goals against Pirin Gotse Delchev.

=== Cherno More ===
For the second half of the 2014–15 season, he joined Cherno More Varna. He scored two goals in the latter stages of the season in home and away victories against Haskovo. He also played all 120 minutes in the 2015 Bulgarian Cup final, where Cherno More won their first Bulgarian Cup against Levski Sofia.

=== Boluspor ===
Hernandez was signed by TFF First League club Boluspor for the 2015–16 season.

=== Junior ===
On 30 June 2016, he flew back to Colombia and joined Junior. His first trophy with the team was the 2017 Copa Colombia.

=== Atletico Huila ===
In 2022, he rejoined Atlético Huila.

== Career statistics ==
(Correct As of 2023)

Club	Season	Division		Cup		Continental		Total	
Club	Season	Apps	Goals	Apps	Goals	Apps	Goals	Apps	Goals
Once Caldas	2009	18	2	0	0	-	-	18	2
Once Caldas	2010	7	1	0	0	2	0	9	1
Deportivo Táchira	2010–11	31	4	0	0	6	0	37	4
Atlético Huila	2011	17	4	0	0	-	-	17	4
Atlético Huila	2012	22	2	2	0	0	0	24	2
Independiente Medellín	2012	24	2	0	0	-	-	24	2
Ludogorets Razgrad	2012–13	9	0	0	0	-	-	9	0
Ludogorets Razgrad	2013–14	13	6	4	0	2	0	19	6
Ludogorets Razgrad	2014–15	2	0	1	2	0	0	3	2
Ludogorets Razgrad	Total	24	6	5	2	2	0	31	8
Cherno More (loan)	2014–15	11	3	3	0	-	-	14	3
Cherno More	2015–16	0	0	0	0	0	0	0	0
Atlético Junior	2016	14	1	6	0	7	0	27	1
Atlético Junior	2017	24	2	6	0	7	1	37	3
Atlético Junior	2018	31	1	2	0	12	0	45	1
Atlético Junior	2019	34	3	2	0	4	0	40	3
Atlético Junior	Total	103	7	16	0	30	1	149	8
Once Caldas	2020	18	1	2	0	0	0	20	1
Once Caldas	2021	11	0	0	0	0	0	11	1
Independiente Medellín	2021	9	0	2	0	0	0	11	0
Independiente Medellín	2022	0	0	1	0	0	0	1	0
Independiente Medellín	Total	9	0	3	0	0	0	12	0
Atletico Huila	2022	17	0	3	0	-	-	20	0
Atletico Huila	2023	37	2	0	0	-	-	37	0

== International career ==
He played with the Colombian U-20 national team at the 2005 South American Youth Championship, which Colombia hosted and won. He then competed at the 2005 FIFA World Youth Championship in the Netherlands, helping Colombia to the Round of 16 before losing to eventual champion Argentina.

== Honours ==
=== Club ===
Ludogorets

- Bulgarian A Group: 2012–13, 2013–14, 2014–15
- Bulgarian Cup: 2013–14
- Bulgarian Supercup: 2014

Cherno More

- Bulgarian Cup: 2014–15

==== Junior ====
- Categoría Primera A: 2018 Finalizacion, 2019 Apertura
- Copa Colombia: 2017

=== International ===
==== Colombia U20 ====
- South American U-20 Championship: 2005
