= Zhivko Petkov =

Bulgarian footballer (born 1993)

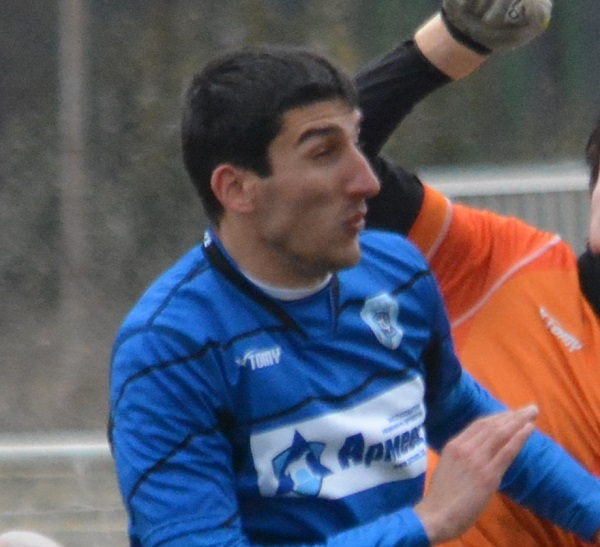

Personal information
- Full name: Zhivko Stoyanov Petkov
- Date of birth: 15 February 1993 (age 33)
- Place of birth: Burgas, Bulgaria
- Height: 1.90 m (6 ft 3 in)
- Position: Forward

Team information
- Current team: Chernomorets 1919
- Number: 9

Youth career
- Naftex Burgas
- Chernomorets Burgas

Senior career*
Years	Team	Apps	(Gls)
2010	Chernomorets Pomorie	10	(2)
2010–2012	Chernomorets Burgas	0	(0)
2011–2012	→ Pomorie (loan)	20	(6)
2012–2014	Neftochimic 1986	55	(18)
2014–2016	Cherno More	39	(3)
2016–2017	Neftochimic	20	(1)
2017–2019	Pomorie	56	(17)
2019–2020	Neftochimic	19	(8)
2020–2022	Hebar	58	(19)
2022	Etar Veliko Tarnovo	16	(5)
2022	Sozopol	0	(0)
2023	F.C. Kafr Qasim	14	(3)
2023–	Chernomorets 1919	108	(43)

International career
2011	Bulgaria U19	3	(0)
2012–2013	Bulgaria U21	7	(1)
- * Club domestic league appearances and goals as of 11 June 2026

Zhivko Stoyanov Petkov (Bulgarian: Живко Стоянов Петков; born 15 February 1993) is a Bulgarian footballer who plays as a forward for Chernomorets 1919.

== Career ==
On 27 June 2012, Petkov joined Neftochimic Burgas. At Neftochimic, he became a member of the first team and his goals helped the "Sheikhs" gain promotion to the A PFG during 2012–13 season. He made 23 appearances, finishing as the club's top scorer with 14 goals.

Petkov made his A PFG debut on 21 July 2013, when he came on as a half-time substitute in a 4–1 away loss against Litex Lovech.

Petkov joined Cherno More in the summer of 2014. He scored his first goal for the team from Varna on 13 September 2014, netting a late equalizer in a league match against CSKA Sofia.

On 6 July 2017, Petkov signed with Pomorie.

== Honours ==
=== Club ===
Cherno More

- Bulgarian Cup: 2014–15
- Bulgarian Supercup: 2015
