= Bekir Rasim =

Bulgarian footballer (born 1994)

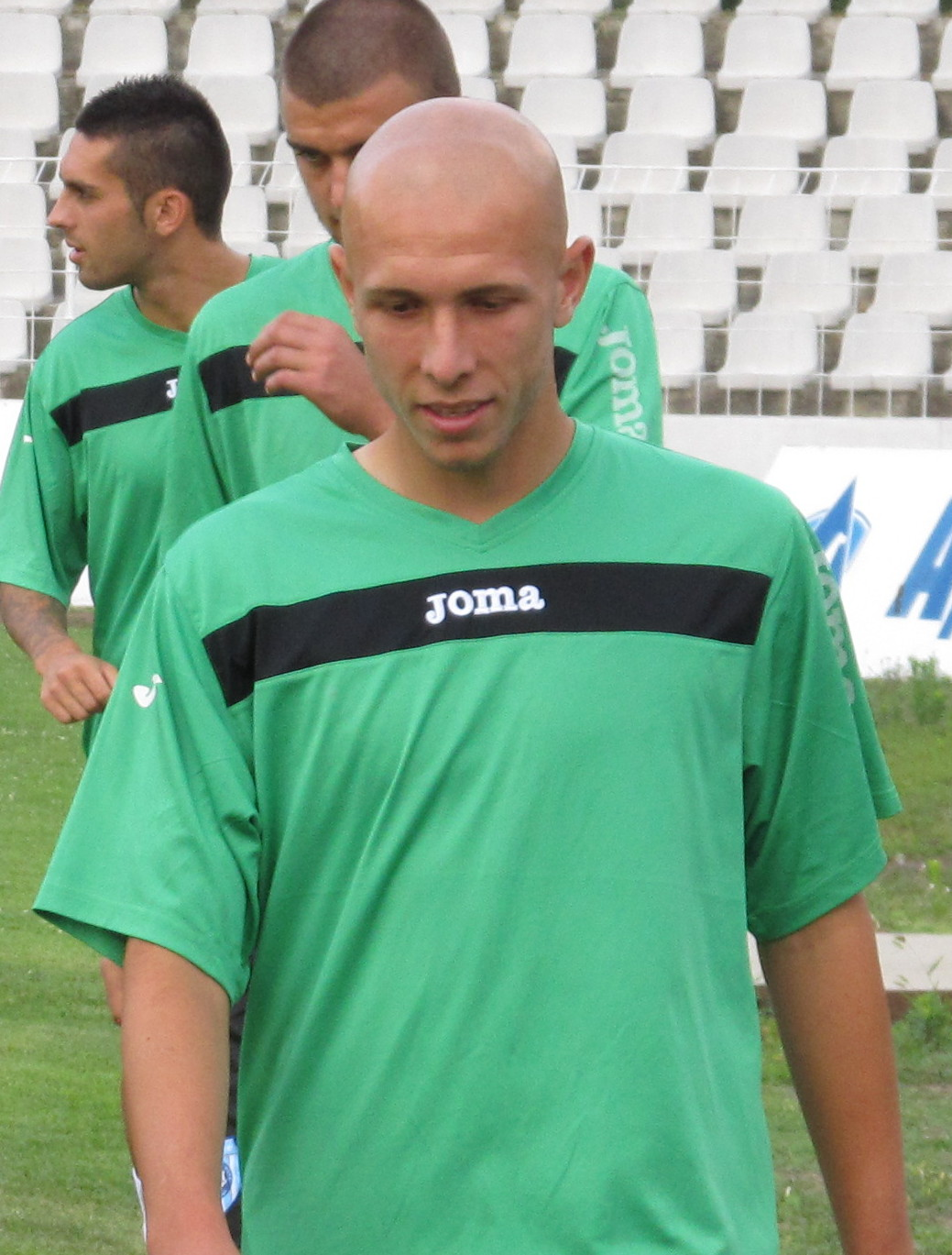

Personal information
- Full name: Bekir Hayrula Rasim
- Date of birth: 26 December 1994 (age 31)
- Place of birth: Varna, Bulgaria
- Height: 1.76 m (5 ft 9 1/2 in)
- Position: Attacking midfielder

Youth career
- 2008–2013: Cherno More

Senior career*
Years	Team	Apps	(Gls)
2012–2016	Cherno More	44	(0)
2016–2020	Pomorie	82	(12)
Total		126	(12)

International career
2010–2012	Bulgaria U17	3	(0)
2012–2014	Bulgaria U19	4	(0)
2013–2016	Bulgaria U21	4	(0)
- * Club domestic league appearances and goals

Bekir Rasim (Bulgarian: Бекир Расим; born 26 December 1994) is a Bulgarian former professional footballer who played as a midfielder.

== Early life and career ==
Born 26 December 1994 in Varna, Rasim was raised in small village Medovets, Dalgopol Municipality.

He joined the Cherno More Academy at the age of fourteen in 2008. Since his childhood Rasim became known with many football ideas on the pitch, excellent passes and direct free kicks. Through these qualities the Cherno More fans gave him the nickname—"the painter", because the Arabic name "Rasim" means painter.

He made his first team début in a 2-0 league home win against Slavia on 23 May 2012, coming on as a substitute for Hristian Popov.

His contract with Cherno More was terminated by mutual consent on 4 July 2016 and he subsequently joined Pomorie in the B PFG.

== Statistics ==
Club	Season	League		Cup		Continental		Other		Total	
Club	Season	Apps	Goals	Apps	Goals	Apps	Goals	Apps	Goals	Apps	Goals
Cherno More	2011–12	1	0	0	0	—	—	—	—	1	0
Cherno More	2012–13	0	0	1	0	—	—	—	—	1	0
Cherno More	2013–14	21	0	1	0	—	—	—	—	22	0
Cherno More	2014–15	13	0	4	2	—	—	—	—	17	2
Cherno More	2015–16	9	0	2	1	0	0	0	0	11	1
Cherno More	Total	44	0	8	3	0	0	0	0	52	3
Pomorie	2016–17	25	2	1	0	—	—	—	—	26	2
Pomorie	2017–18	24	4	1	0	—	—	—	—	25	4
Pomorie	2018–19	25	6	1	0	—	—	—	—	26	6
Pomorie	2019–20	8	0	1	0	—	—	—	—	9	0
Pomorie	Total	82	12	4	0	0	0	0	0	86	12
Career statistics		126	12	12	3	0	0	0	0	138	15

== Honours ==
=== Club ===
Cherno More

- Bulgarian Cup: 2014–15
- Bulgarian Supercup: 2015
