= Kircho Krumov =

Bulgarian footballer

Personal information
- Full name: Kircho Georgiev Krumov
- Date of birth: 29 June 1983 (age 43)
- Place of birth: Haskovo, Bulgaria
- Height: 1.80 m (5 ft 11 in)
- Position: Defender

Team information
- Current team: Haskovo
- Number: 17

Youth career
- Haskovo

Senior career*
Years	Team	Apps	(Gls)
2004–2007	Haskovo	37	(2)
2008–2009	Lyubimets 2007	39	(3)
2010	Sportist Svoge	5	(0)
2010–2011	Lyubimets 2007	21	(1)
2011–2012	Sliven 2000	7	(1)
2012–	Haskovo	61	(4)
- * Club domestic league appearances and goals as of 29 May 2015

Kircho Krumov (Bulgarian: Кирчо Крумов; born 29 June 1983) is a Bulgarian footballer who currently plays for Haskovo as a defender.
