= 2003–04 B Group =

Season of the Bulgarian B Football Group

Bulgarian B Group
- Season: 2003–04
- Champions: Beroe Stara Zagora
- Promoted: Beroe Stara Zagora, Pirin Blagoevgrad, Nesebar
- Relegated: Septemvri Sofia, Belite orli Pleven, Vihar-Vladislav, Sokol Markovo
- Matches: 182
- Goals: 453 (2.49 per match)
- Top goalscorer: (Bulgaria) Vladislav Zlatinov (19 goals)

The 2003–04 B Group was the 48th season of the Bulgarian B Football Group, the second tier of the Bulgarian football league system. A total of 16 teams contested the league.

== League table ==
Pos	Team	Pld	W	D	L	GF	GA	GD	Pts	Promotion or relegation
1	Beroe Stara Zagora (P)	26	17	7	2	45	13	+32	58	Promotion to 2004–05 A Group
2	Pirin Blagoevgrad (P)	26	14	7	5	44	19	+25	49	Promotion to 2004–05 A Group
3	Nesebar (P)	26	13	7	6	38	32	+6	46	Promotion to 2004–05 A Group
4	Dobrudzha Dobrich	26	12	8	6	45	27	+18	44	
5	Svetkavitsa Targovishte	26	11	9	6	32	27	+5	42	
6	Rilski Sportist	26	10	4	12	31	35	−4	34	
7	Spartak Pleven	26	8	10	8	30	36	−6	34	
8	Etar 1924 Veliko Tarnovo	26	8	8	10	31	34	−3	32	
9	Vihren Sandanski	26	9	4	13	32	40	−8	31	
10	Shumen 2001	26	8	7	11	25	32	−7	31	
11	Conegliano German	26	8	6	12	30	35	−5	30	
12	Akademik Svishtov	26	6	6	14	25	36	−11	24	
13	Septemvri Sofia (R)	26	4	9	13	20	40	−20	21	Relegation to 2004–05 V Group
14	Belite orli Pleven (R)	26	5	6	15	25	47	−22	21	Relegation to 2004–05 V Group
x	Vihar-Vladislav (Note: Vihar-Vladislav were excluded after nine matches and demoted to their regional third level league (Northeastern V Group) for failing to arrange their debts, their results were annulled.) (D)	9	0	1	8	5	21	−16	1	Excluded from the league
x	Sokol Markovo (Note: Sokol Markovo were excluded after eight matches and demoted to their regional third level league (Southeastern V Group) for failing to arrange their debts, their results were annulled.) (D)	8	0	1	7	3	19	−16	1	Excluded from the league

Source: 2004 Football retro-football.bg
Rules for classification: 1) points; 2) goal difference; 3) number of goals scored.
(D) Disqualified; (P) Promoted; (R) Relegated

== Top scorers ==
Rank	Scorer	Club	Goals
1	(Bulgaria) Vladislav Zlatinov	Pirin Blagoevgrad	19
2	(Bulgaria) Vasil Banov	Nesebar	15
3	(Bulgaria) Georgi Kakalov	Belite orli	11
3	(Bulgaria) Kaloyan Genchev	Dobrudzha	11
3	(Bulgaria) Zahari Dimitrov	Shumen 2001	11
6	(Bulgaria) Georgi Ivanov	Spartak Pleven	9
7	(Bulgaria) Denislav Andreev	Rilski Sportist	8
8	(Bulgaria) Borislav Borisov	Akademik Svishtov	7
8	(Bulgaria) Rumen Kalchev	Beroe	7
8	(Bulgaria) Svilen Spasov	Vihren	7
8	(Bulgaria) Dobrin Orlovski	Vihren	7
8	(Bulgaria) Pavlin Todorov	Dobrudzha	7
8	(Bulgaria) Ivaylo Yordanov	Etar 1924	7
8	(Bulgaria) Kiril Dyakov	Conegliano	7
8	(Bulgaria) Stanislav Ladzhov	Conegliano	7
8	(Bulgaria) Georgi Daskalov	Pirin Blagoevgrad	7
8	(Bulgaria) Vasil Garkov	Rilski Sportist	7
8	(Bulgaria) Dragomir Ivanov	Spartak Pleven	7
8	(Bulgaria) Ivelin Drashkov	Shumen 2001	7
