= Kristiyan Petkov =

Bulgarian footballer

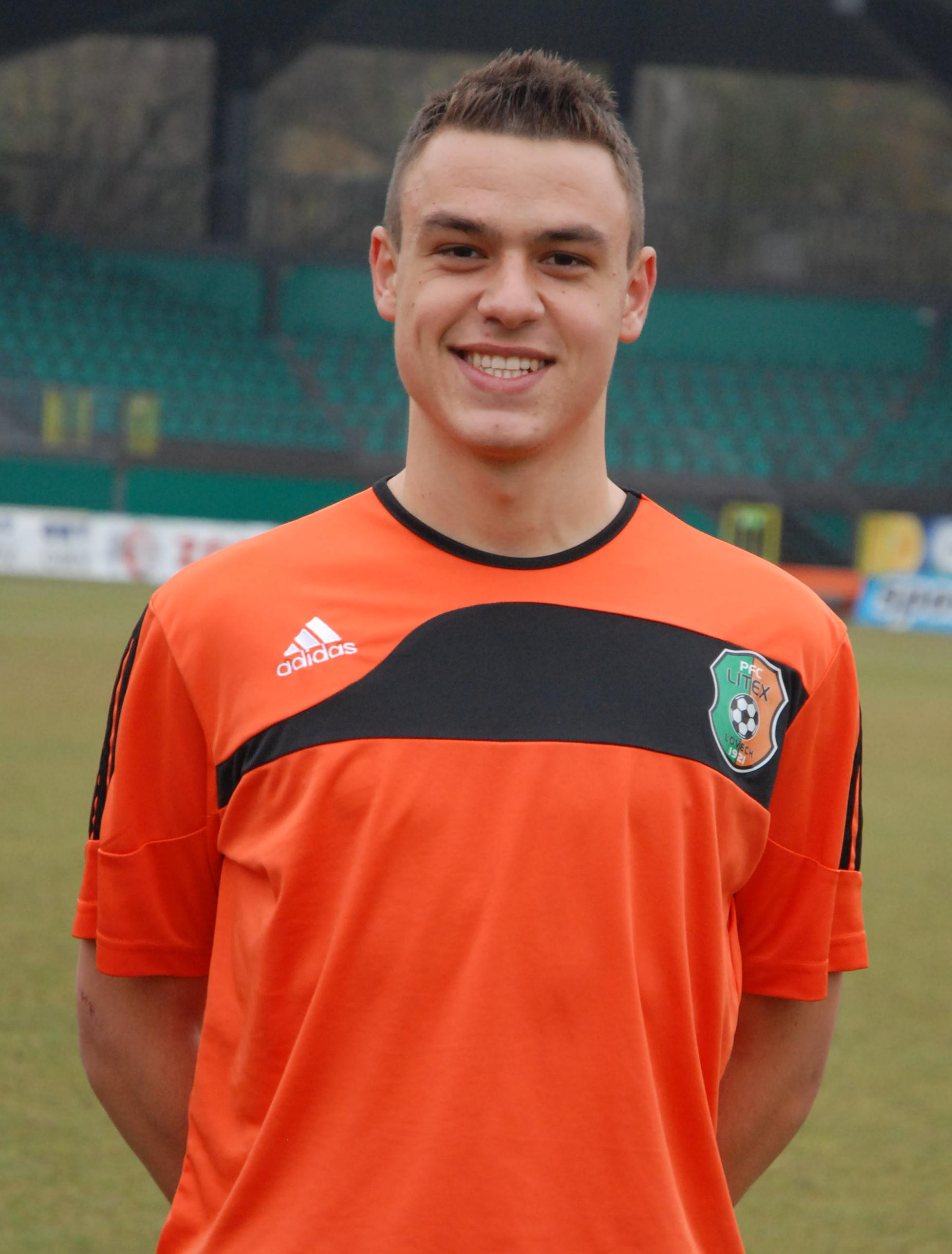

Personal information
- Full name: Kristiyan Kostadinov Petkov
- Date of birth: 19 August 1994 (age 32)
- Place of birth: Dobrich, Bulgaria
- Height: 1.80 m (5 ft 11 in)
- Positions: Winger; forward

Team information
- Current team: Ustrem Donchevo
- Number: 7

Youth career
- 2002–2009: Dobrudzha Dobrich
- 2009–2013: Litex Lovech

Senior career*
Years	Team	Apps	(Gls)
2012–2014	Litex Lovech	0	(0)
2013	→ Dobrudzha Dobrich (loan)	13	(0)
2014	→ Dunav Ruse (loan)	9	(0)
2014	Marek Dupnitsa	12	(1)
2015	Minyor Pernik	?	(?)
2016	Dobrudzha Dobrich	10	(2)
2016–2018	Litex Lovech	5	(2)
2018–2020	Dobrudzha Dobrich	20	(2)
2020–2021	Septemvri Tervel	?	(?)
2021–	Ustrem Donchevo	?	(?)

International career
2010–2011	Bulgaria U17	3	(0)
2012–2013	Bulgaria U19	5	(1)
- * Club domestic league appearances and goals as of 29 March 2022

Kristiyan Petkov (Bulgarian: Кристиян Петков; born 19 August 1994) is a Bulgarian footballer who currently plays as a winger for Ustrem Donchevo. His strong leg is his left.

== Career ==
He starts training football at the age of eight at Dobrudzha School (Dobrich). His first coach was Radoslav Boyanov, and later Dimitar Nedialkov. He has won individual awards, including Best Forward in the second and third "Peter Boyanov – Albena" Children's Football Tournament in 2007 and 2008, respectively. He receives offers from the youth academies of CSKA (Sofia) and Levski (Sofia), but he decides to continue his development at Litex Academy. He also reached the final of the Bulgarian Football Union Cup in the 1993 age group in 2011. In 2012, he become the champion and top scorer of the "Yulian Manzarov" International Youth Tournament.

== Career statistics ==
=== Club ===
As of 20 July 2014

Club	Season	Division	League		Cup		Europe		Total	
Club	Season	Division	Apps	Goals	Apps	Goals	Apps	Goals	Apps	Goals
Litex Lovech	2012–13	A Group	0	0	1	0	–		1	0
Dobrudzha (loan)	2013–14	B Group	13	0	2	0	–		15	0
Dunav Ruse (loan)	2013–14	B Group	9	0	0	0	–		9	0
Marek Dupnitsa	2014–15	A Group	3	0	0	0	–		3	0
Career Total			25	0	3	0	0	0	29	0
