= Kiril Akalski =

Bulgarian footballer (born 1985)

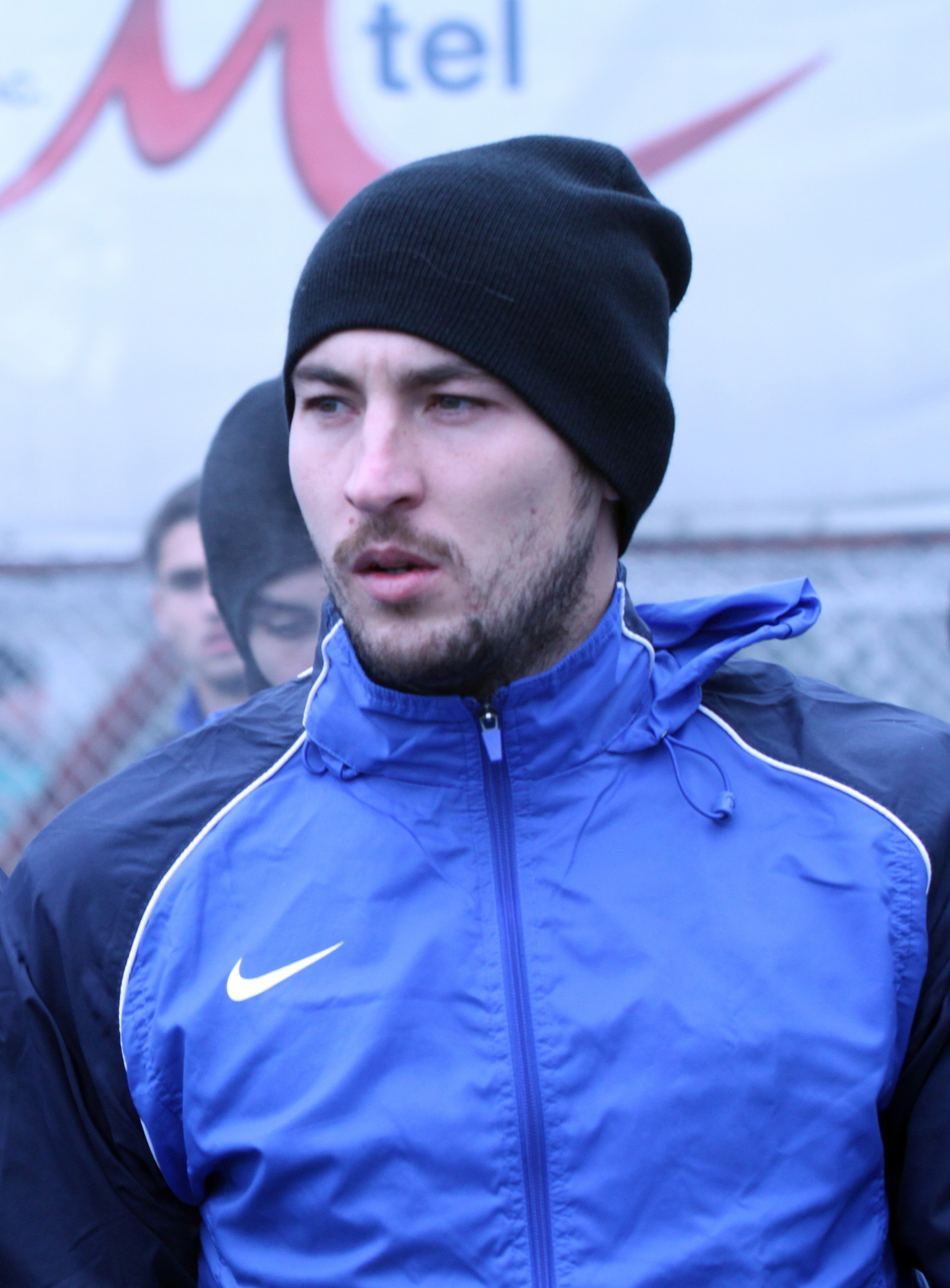

Personal information
- Full name: Kiril Naydenov Akalski
- Date of birth: 17 October 1985 (age 41)
- Place of birth: Plovdiv, Bulgaria
- Height: 1.86 m (6 ft 1 in)
- Position: Goalkeeper

Team information
- Current team: Oborishte
- Number: 1

Senior career*
Years	Team	Apps	(Gls)
2005–2007	Maritsa Plovdiv	44	(0)
2008–2010	Lokomotiv Plovdiv	30	(0)
2010–2011	Levski Sofia	3	(0)
2012–2013	Beroe	18	(0)
2013–2014	Lokomotiv Plovdiv	5	(0)
2014	Cherno More	0	(0)
2014	Rakovski	10	(0)
2015	Haskovo	2	(0)
2015–2016	Unterföhring	15	(0)
2016–2017	Etar	26	(0)
2018	Maritsa Plovdiv	8	(0)
2018–	Oborishte	24	(0)
- * Club domestic league appearances and goals as of 26 May 2019

Kiril Akalski (Bulgarian: Кирил Акалски; born 17 October 1985) is a Bulgarian footballer who plays as a goalkeeper for Oborishte Panagyurishte.

== Career ==
=== Maritsa Plovdiv ===
Born in Plovdiv his first club was local Maritsa. Akalski started his professional football career at the second division team in the 2005–06 season.

=== Lokomotiv Plovdiv ===
He then transferred to Lokomotiv Plovdiv in the winter of 2008, as this gave him the opportunity to play in the top division. Akalski signed a two-a-half years deal with the club in January 2008. He has been given the No.12 shirt.

On 31 October 2009, he was involved in a serious on-pitch brawl, following his team's 0–1 defeat to Botev Plovdiv.

=== Levski Sofia ===
On 14 August 2010 it was announced that Kiril Akalski is came to an agreement with Levski Sofia. On 20 August 2010 Akalski officially signed his contract with Levski. The contract is for 3 years. Akalski chose to play with kit number 85.

Akalski made his unofficial debut for Levski on 4 September 2010 in a friendly match against Montana. He entered the match as a substitute for the final 3–1 win for Levski.

=== Return to Maritsa ===
In January 2018, Akalski joined his hometown club Maritsa Plovdiv. He left the club at the end of the 2017–18 season following the relegation to Third League.

=== Oborishte ===
On 10 July 2018, Akalski signed with Third League club Oborishte.

== Career stats ==
Updated 9 January 2011.

Club	Season	League		Cup		Europe		Total	
Club	Season	Apps	Goals	Apps	Goals	Apps	Goals	Apps	Goals
Levski Sofia	2010–11	3	0	1	0	1	0	5	0
Career totals		3	0	1	0	1	0	5	0
