= Sténio =

Cape Verdean association football player

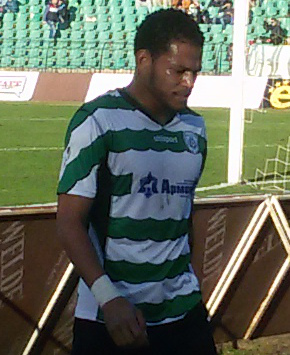
- Sténio with Cherno More in 2015

Personal information
- Full name: Sténio Nivaldo Matos dos Santos
- Date of birth: 6 May 1988 (age 38)
- Place of birth: Mindelo, Cape Verde
- Height: 1.79 m (5 ft 10 1/2 in)
- Position: Central midfielder

Team information
- Current team: Sacavenense

Senior career*
Years	Team	Apps	(Gls)
2007–2009	Académica do Mindelo	?	(?)
2009–2010	CS Mindelense	?	(?)
2010–2014	Feirense	85	(2)
2014–2016	Cherno More	56	(7)
2016	Botev Plovdiv	16	(1)
2017	Politehnica Iași	3	(0)
2017	Dacia Chișinău	11	(0)
2018	Ventspils	11	(2)
2019–2020	União de Santarém	15	(2)
2021–	Sacavenense	4	(2)

International career^{‡}
2012–	Cape Verde	5	(0)
- * Club domestic league appearances and goals as of 6 March 2021 ‡ National team caps and goals as of 2 March 2016

Sténio Nivaldo Matos dos Santos (born 6 May 1988), commonly known as Sténio, is a Cape Verde international footballer who plays as a midfielder for Sacavenense.

== Career ==
Born in Mindelo, Sténio started his career at hometown club Académica do Mindelo. In 2009, he joined the other club in the town CS Mindelense.

On 1 July 2014, Sténio joined Cherno More Varna in Bulgaria on a two-year contract. On 30 May 2015, Sténio was sent off with a second yellow card after 38 minutes in the 2015 Bulgarian Cup Final against Levski Sofia, but his team managed to prevail after extra time despite its numerical disadvantage.

In July 2016, he signed a one-year contract with Botev Plovdiv. He was released in December.

Sténio left FK Ventspils after one year, at the end of 2018.

== International career ==
Sténio received his first call-up to the Cape Verde squad in May 2012, for the 2014 FIFA World Cup qualifier against Sierra Leone on 2 June. He made his debut in the match, playing from the start in central midfield.

In January 2013, Sténio was named in Cape Verde's squad for the 2013 Africa Cup of Nations, but did not feature in any of the four games Cape Verde played.

== Career statistics ==
=== Club ===
As of 29 December 2016

Club performance			League		Cup		League Cup		Continental		Total	
Season	Club	League	Apps	Goals	Apps	Goals	Apps	Goals	Apps	Goals	Apps	Goals
Portugal			League		Taça de Portugal		Taça da Liga		Europe		Total	
2010–11	Feirense	Segunda Liga	4	0	0	0	0	0	—		4	0
2011–12	Feirense	Primeira Liga	22	0	0	0	2	0	—		24	0
2012–13	Feirense	Segunda Liga	28	1	1	0	4	2	—		33	3
2013–14	Feirense	Segunda Liga	31	1	1	0	1	1	—		33	2
Bulgaria			League		Bulgarian Cup		---		Europe		Total	
2014–15	Cherno More	A Group	28	5	7	2	—		—		35	7
2015–16	Cherno More	A Group	28	2	1	0	—		2	0	31	2
2016–17	Botev Plovdiv	First League	16	1	1	0	—		—		17	1
Career total			157	10	11	2	7	3	2	0	177	15

== Honours ==
=== Club ===
Cherno More

- Bulgarian Cup: 2014–15
- Bulgarian Supercup: 2015
