= Kiril Kotev =

Bulgarian footballer

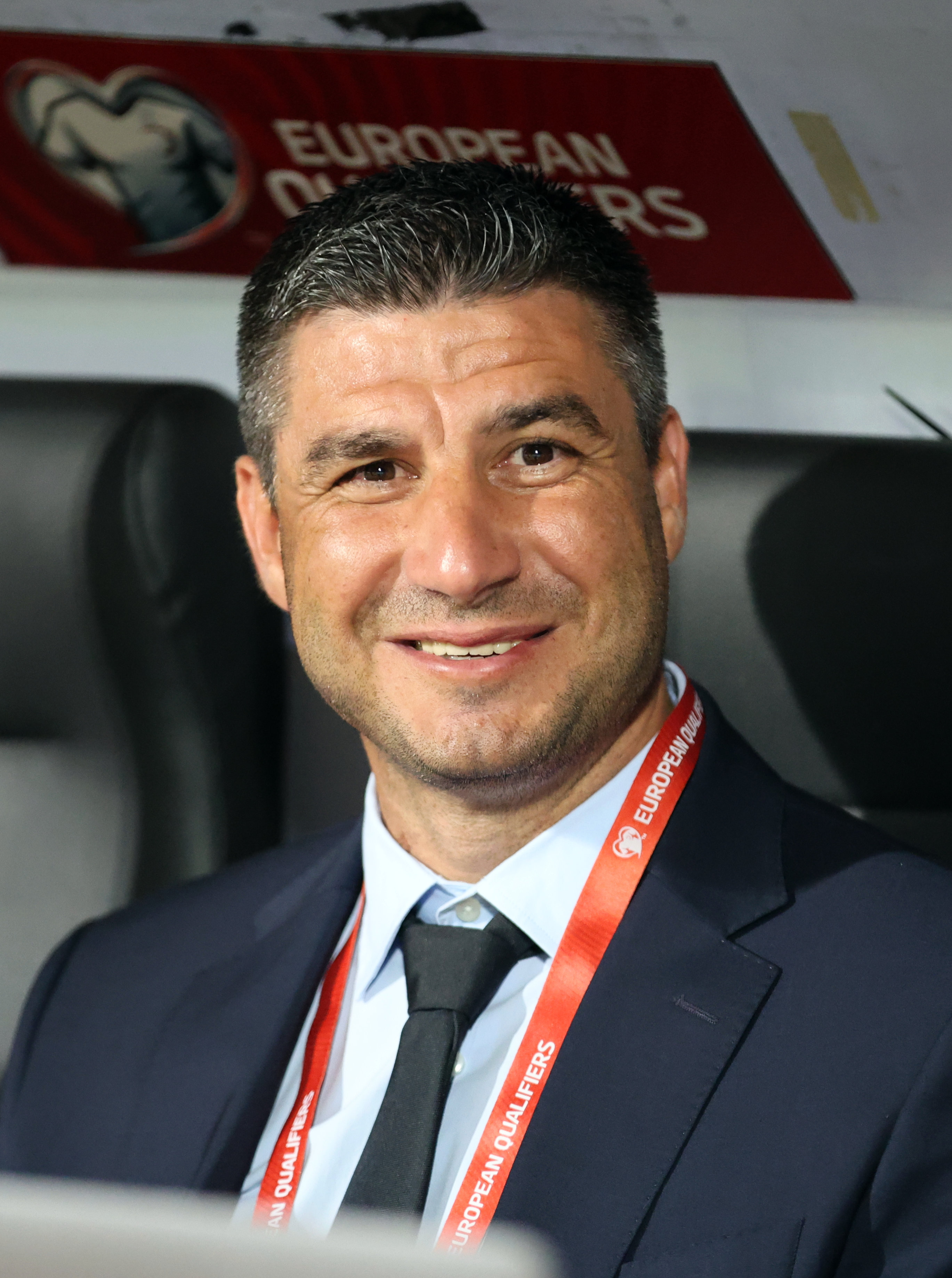
- Kotev in 2025

Personal information
- Full name: Kiril Hristov Kotev
- Date of birth: 18 April 1982 (age 44)
- Place of birth: Sofia, Bulgaria
- Height: 1.87 m (6 ft 1 1/2 in)
- Position: Centre back

Youth career
- Vihar Gorublyane

Senior career*
Years	Team	Apps	(Gls)
1999–2002	Velbazhd Kyustendil	1	(0)
2001–2002	→ Vidima-Rakovski (loan)	18	(2)
2002–2005	Lokomotiv Plovdiv	79	(7)
2005–2010	CSKA Sofia	83	(6)
2010	Lokomotiv Plovdiv	16	(0)
2011	Dalian Aerbin	23	(1)
2012–2013	Lokomotiv Plovdiv	22	(2)
2013–2015	Cherno More	60	(3)
2015–2017	Lokomotiv Plovdiv	57	(3)
2017–2018	CSKA 1948	29	(7)
Total		388	(31)

International career
2004–2009	Bulgaria	6	(0)

Managerial career
- 2018–2021: CSKA 1948 (sporting director)
- 2022–2024: CSKA 1948 (sports director)
- * Club domestic league appearances and goals

Kiril Hristov Kotev (Bulgarian: Кирил Котев; born 18 April 1982) is a Bulgarian former professional footballer who played as a defender. He is currently employed as the technical director of the Bulgarian Football Union.

== Club career ==
In his youth years, Kotev started to play football at Vihar Gorublyane. At the age of 16 he moved to Velbazhd Kyustendil. In 2002 Kotev signed with Lokomotiv Plovdiv, with whom he became a Champion of Bulgaria and holder of Bulgarian Supercup in 2004. In the same year he made his debut for the Bulgaria national football team.

In January 2005, CSKA Sofia signed Kotev to a four-year deal for €100,000. After the departure of Aleksandar Tunchev and Valentin Iliev in the summer of 2008, he started to play a lot more regularly showing his great abilities, great sense for marking and also scoring some important goals for the club.

On 5 June 2013, Kotev signed with Cherno More. He quickly became an important player and was made team captain in February 2014. He left the club after his contract expired at the end of the 2014–15 season. On 26 May, it was announced that he will be released and Kotev was not included in the squad for the 2015 Bulgarian Cup Final.

On 24 June 2015, Kotev signed a 1-year contract with his old club Lokomotiv Plovdiv. He was released on 15 June 2017 and publicly expressed his disappointment regarding the late announcement of the club's decision.

On 7 July 2017 he joined CSKA 1948 in the Bulgarian Third League.

On 12 June 2018, Kotev was appointed as sporting director of CSKA 1948 which marked his retirement as footballer.

== International career ==
He was part of the Bulgarian 2004 European Football Championship team, which exited in the first round, finishing bottom of Group C, having finished top of Qualifying Group 8 in the pre-tournament phase.

== Chinese League career statistics ==
(Correct as of 1 March 2012)

Season	Club	League	League		FA Cup		CSL Cup		Asia		Total	
Season	Club	League	Apps	Goals	Apps	Goals	Apps	Goals	Apps	Goals	Apps	Goals
2011	Dalian Aerbin	China League One	23	1	1	0	-	-	-	-	24	1
Total			23	1	1	0	0	0	0	0	24	1

== Honours ==
Lokomotiv Plovdiv

- A Group: 2003–04
- Bulgarian Supercup: 2004

CSKA Sofia

- A Group: 2007–08
- Bulgarian Cup: 2005–06
- Bulgarian Supercup (2): 2006, 2008

Dalian Aerbin

- China League One: 2011
