= Iliya Nikolov =

Bulgarian footballer

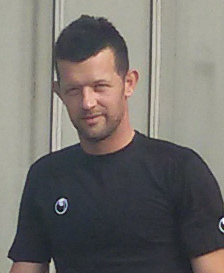

Personal information
- Full name: Iliya Nikolaev Nikolov
- Date of birth: 14 July 1986 (age 40)
- Place of birth: Plovdiv, Bulgaria
- Height: 1.85 m (6 ft 1 in)
- Position: Goalkeeper

Team information
- Current team: Maritsa Plovdiv
- Number: 86

Senior career*
Years	Team	Apps	(Gls)
2005–2006	Haskovo	25	(0)
2007–2010	Litex Lovech	3	(0)
2008	→ Spartak Varna (loan)	11	(0)
2009	→ Svilengrad (loan)	13	(0)
2009–2010	→ Spartak Plovdiv (loan)	19	(0)
2010–2011	Botev Plovdiv	21	(0)
2012	Nesebar	9	(0)
2012–2014	Rakovski	22	(0)
2014	→ Botev Plovdiv (loan)	0	(0)
2014–2015	Cherno More	6	(0)
2016–	Maritsa Plovdiv	166	(1)

Managerial career
- 2016–: Maritsa Plovdiv (goalkeeping coach)
- * Club domestic league appearances and goals as of 5 June 2023

Iliya Nikolov (Bulgarian: Илия Николов; born 14 July 1986) is a Bulgarian footballer, who plays as a goalkeeper for Maritsa Plovdiv. He is also acting as goalkeeping coach.

== Career ==
Nikolov started his career in his home town Haskovo in the local team FC Haskovo, before signing with Litex Lovech. He then played for two seasons on loan at Svilengrad and then Spartak Plovdiv, before terminating his Litex contract by mutual consent to move to Botev Plovdiv.

== Honours ==
Cherno More Varna

- Bulgarian Cup: 2014–15
