= 2015 Bulgarian Cup final =

- Event: 2014–15 Bulgarian Cup
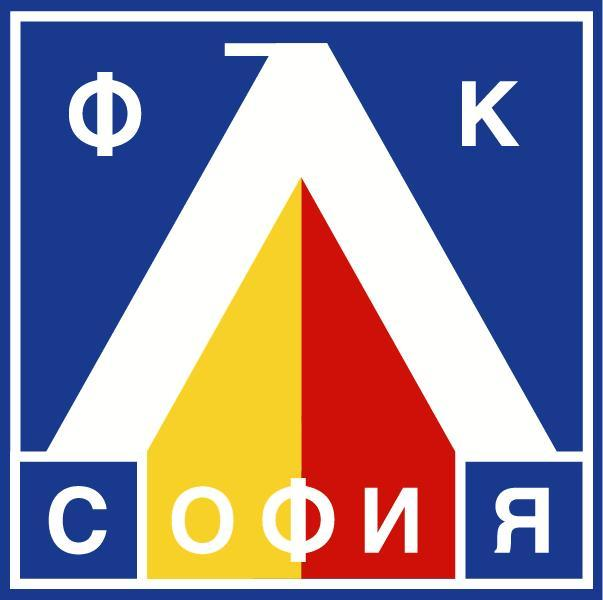
Levski Sofia	Cherno More
1	2
- After extra time
- Date: 30 May 2015
- Venue: Lazur Stadium, Burgas
- Referee: Ivaylo Stoyanov (Petrich)
- Attendance: 13,910

The 2015 Bulgarian Cup final was the 75th final of the Bulgarian Cup, and was contested between Levski Sofia and Cherno More Varna on 30 May 2015 at Lazur Stadium in Burgas. Cherno More won the final 2–1, claiming their first Bulgarian Cup title.

The winner qualified for the second qualifying round of the 2015–16 UEFA Europa League and will also face the champions of the 2014–15 A Group in the 2015 Bulgarian Supercup.

== Route to the final ==
Levski			Round	Cherno More
Opponent	Result	Legs		Opponent	Result	Legs
Spartak Varna	7–1	7–1 away	Round of 32	Sozopol	2–0	2–0 away
Montana	4–2	0–2 away; 4–0 home	Round of 16	Slavia Sofia	4–2	2–0 home; 2–2 away
Haskovo	4–1	3–0 home; 1–1 away	Quarter-finals	Lokomotiv GO	6–0	1–0 home; 5–0 away
Ludogorets Razgrad	1–0	0–0 away; 1–0 home	Semi-finals	Lokomotiv Plovdiv	8–3	5–1 home; 3–2 away

== Match ==
=== Details ===
30 May 2015
20:00 EEST

Levski Sofia	1–2 (a.e.t.)	Cherno More Varna
Añete 72'	Report	Bacari 90+2'; Coureur 119'

Lazur Stadium, Burgas
Attendance: 13,910
Referee: Ivaylo Stoyanov (Petrich)

Levski	Cherno More

GK	29	(Serbia) Bojan Jorgačević
RB	15	(Slovakia) Roman Procházka
CB	5	(Bulgaria) Borislav Stoychev	(yellow card) 20'
CB	3	(Tunisia) Aymen Belaïd	(yellow card) 24'	(substituted off) 28'
LB	14	(Bulgaria) Veselin Minev	(red card) 120+4'
CM	45	(Bulgaria) Vladimir Gadzhev (c)
CM	10	(Spain) Miguel Bedoya
RW	11	(Netherlands) Luís Pedro		(substituted off) 64'
AM	20	(Spain) Añete	(yellow card) 105+2'	(substituted off) 87'
LW	7	(Norway) Liban Abdi
CF	17	(Bulgaria) Valeri Domovchiyski
Substitutes:
GK	23	(Bulgaria) Plamen Iliev
DF	2	(Bulgaria) Aleksandar Aleksandrov
DF	4	(Bulgaria) Miki Orachev
DF	31	(Romania) Emil Ninu		(substituted on) 28'
MF	12	(Bulgaria) Bozhidar Kraev		(substituted on) 64'
MF	18	(Bulgaria) Borislav Tsonev
MF	77	(Bulgaria) Stefan Velev		(substituted on) 87'
Manager:
(Bulgaria) Stoycho Stoev

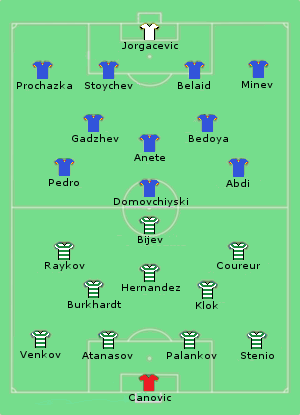

GK	40	(Serbia) Aleksandar Čanović
RB	8	(Cape Verde) Sténio	(yellow card) 34' (yellow-red card) 38'
CB	84	(Bulgaria) Todor Palankov
CB	91	(Bulgaria) Zhivko Atanasov		(substituted off) 86'
LB	4	(Bulgaria) Mihail Venkov (c)	(yellow card) 98'
CM	10	(Netherlands) Marc Klok	(yellow card) 82'
CM	18	(Poland) Marcin Burkhardt
RW	19	(Martinique) Mathias Coureur
AM	22	(Colombia) Sebastián Hernández	(yellow card) 106'
LW	13	(Bulgaria) Simeon Raykov		(substituted off) 75'
CF	20	(Bulgaria) Villyan Bijev		(substituted off) 59'
Substitutes:
GK	1	(Bulgaria) Iliya Nikolov
MF	3	(Bulgaria) Daniel Georgiev
MF	7	(Bulgaria) Bekir Rasim
MF	17	(Bulgaria) Ivan Kokonov		(substituted on) 75'
FW	9	(Spain) Bacari		(substituted on) 59'
FW	11	(Bulgaria) Zhivko Petkov
FW	14	(Bulgaria) Georgi Bozhilov		(substituted on) 86'
Manager:
(Bulgaria) Nikola Spasov

MAN OF THE MATCH

MATCH OFFICIALS

- Assistant referees:Ivo Kolev & Krum Stoilov
- Fourth official: Vihren Manev

MATCH RULES

- 90 minutes.
- 30 minutes of extra-time if necessary.
- Penalty shoot-out if scores still level.
- Seven named substitutes.
- Maximum of three substitutions.

== See also ==
- 2014–15 A Group
