= 2013–14 PFC Slavia Sofia season =

Slavia Sofia, a Bulgarian football team, played in the 2013-14 seasons of the A PFG and Bulgarian Cup.

== Competitions ==
=== A Group ===
==== First phase ====
===== Table =====
Pos	Team	Pld	W	D	L	GF	GA	GD	Pts	Qualification
7	Cherno More	26	12	7	7	31	21	+10	43	Qualification for championship group
8	Beroe	26	11	6	9	32	25	+7	39	Qualification for relegation group
9	Slavia Sofia	26	8	7	11	35	38	−3	31 (Note: Slavia Sofia ahead of Lokomotiv Sofia on head-to-head record; Slavia Sofia–Lokomotiv Sofia 3–1, Lokomotiv Sofia–Slavia Sofia 0–1.)	Qualification for relegation group
10	Lokomotiv Sofia	26	9	4	13	30	44	−14	31	Qualification for relegation group
11	Chernomorets Burgas	26	6	4	16	30	46	−16	22	Qualification for relegation group

Source: A PFG (in Bulgarian)
Rules for classification: 1st points; 2nd head-to-head points; 3rd head-to-head goal difference; 4th head-to-head goals scored; 5th head-to-head away goals scored; 6th season goal difference; 7th season goals scored; 8th "sportsmanship" (R & Y cards); 9th draw

===== Results summary =====
Overall								Home						Away					
Pld	W	D	L	GF	GA	GD	Pts	W	D	L	GF	GA	GD	W	D	L	GF	GA	GD
26	8	7	11	35	38	−3	31	6	1	6	19	14	+5	2	6	5	16	24	−8

Last updated: 9 March 2014.
Source: Soccerway

===== Matches =====
22 July 2013 Match 1	Slavia Sofia	0 - 2	Beroe	Sofia
18:00	Ivanov (yellow card) 28'; Zhelev (yellow card) 56'; Filipov (yellow card) 90+2'; Fernando Silva dos Santos (yellow card) 90+4'	Summary	David Caiado 50'; Hristov 67'	Stadium: Ovcha Kupel Stadium; Attendance: 200; Referee: (Bulgaria) Ivaylo Stoyanov

27 July 2013 Match 2	Cherno More	0 - 0	Slavia Sofia	Varna
18:00	Raykov (yellow card) 68'; Iliev (yellow card) 80'; Kolev (yellow card) 82'	Summary	Atanasov (yellow card) 49' (yellow-red card)	Stadium: Ticha Stadium; Attendance: 1,200; Referee: (Bulgaria) Tasko Taskov

3 August 2013 Match 3	Slavia Sofia	0 - 3	Ludogorets	Sofia
18:00	Ivanov (yellow card) 22'; Baldzhiyski (yellow card) 30'; Zhelev (yellow card) 59'	Summary	Hernández 10' (yellow card) 23'; Moți (yellow card) 40'; Aleksandrov 56'; Juninho Quixadá 84'; Burgzorg (yellow card) 90+2'	Stadium: Ovcha Kupel Stadium; Attendance: 100; Referee: (Bulgaria) Nikola Popov

9 August 2013 Match 4	Neftochimic	1 - 1	Slavia Sofia	Burgas
21:00	Yoshev (yellow card) 35'; Yanev (yellow card) 47'; Dimitrov 77'	Summary	Fernando Silva dos Santos 20' (yellow card) 23'; Dimitrov (yellow card) 29'; Sandanski (yellow card) 47'; Yanchev (yellow card) 50'	Stadium: Lazur Stadium; Attendance: 1,500; Referee: (Bulgaria) Stanislav Stavrov

16 August 2013 Match 5	Slavia Sofia	3 - 1	Lokomotiv Sofia	Sofia
18:00	Zhelev 37'; Atanasov 45+2' (pen.); Yanchev (yellow card) 51'; Kurdov 63'; Ivanov (yellow card) 74'; Petkov (yellow card) 90+1'	Summary	Marquinhos 49'; Tom (yellow card) 49'; Mahamat (yellow card) 53'	Stadium: Ovcha Kupel Stadium; Attendance: 150; Referee: (Bulgaria) Tsvetan Krastev

25 August 2013 Match 6	Botev Plovdiv	3 - 2	Slavia Sofia	Plovdiv
18:00	Kortzorg 21'; Nedelev 34'; Jirsák 78'; Kostov (yellow card) 82'	Summary	Kurdov 18'; Zhelev (yellow card) 57'; Fernando Silva dos Santos 63'; Sandanski (yellow card) 74'	Stadium: Hristo Botev Stadium; Attendance: 4,400; Referee: (Bulgaria) Radan Miryanov

31 August 2013 Match 7	Slavia Sofia	3 - 0	Pirin Gotse Delchev	Sofia
18:00	Petkov (yellow card) 31'; Kurdov 51', 85'; Popara (yellow card) 80'; Ivanov 89' (pen.)	Summary	Vitanov (yellow card) 27'; Bliznakov (yellow card) 31'; Nikolov (yellow card) 62'; Pirgov (yellow card) 67'	Stadium: Ovcha Kupel Stadium; Attendance: 80; Referee: (Bulgaria) Stoyan Denev

14 September 2013 Match 8	Litex Lovech	1 - 1	Slavia Sofia	Lovech
21:00	Vajushi 59'	Summary	Ivanov 28' (yellow card) 66'; Dimitrov (yellow card) 36'; Fernando Silva dos Santos (yellow card) 44'; Atanasov (yellow card) 74'; Petkov (yellow card) 79'; Shalayev (yellow card) 81'	Stadium: Lovech Stadium; Attendance: 700; Referee: (Bulgaria) Alexandre Kostadinov

21 September 2013 Match 9	Slavia Sofia	1 - 1	FC Lyubimets 2007	Sofia
17:00	Ivanov (yellow card) 40'; Kurdov 60'; Popara (yellow card) 88'	Summary	Ognyanov 17' (yellow card) 90+1'; Tsankov (yellow card) 47'; Budinov (yellow card) 56'; Petrov (yellow card) 90+3'	Stadium: Ovcha Kupel Stadium; Attendance: 90; Referee: (Bulgaria) Angel Bayaltsaliev

25 September 2013 Match 10	Chernomorets Burgas	2 - 2	Slavia Sofia	Burgas
19:00	Manzorro (yellow card) 18'; Ammari 51'; Baltanov 89' (pen.)	Summary	Kurdov 22'; Velkov (yellow card) 39'; Fernando Silva dos Santos 56' (yellow card) 81'; Sandanski (yellow card) 66'; Zhelev (yellow card) 74'; Dimitrov (yellow card) 87'; Genev (yellow card) 88'; Petkov (yellow card) 90'	Stadium: Lazur Stadium; Attendance: 550; Referee: (Bulgaria) Vladimir Valkov

28 September 2013 Match 11	Slavia Sofia	0 - 1	Levski Sofia	Sofia
15:15	Shalayev (yellow card) 38'; Fernando Silva dos Santos (yellow card) 48'; Popara (yellow card) 72'	Summary	Dimov (yellow card) 28'; Alejandro Pérez Navarro (yellow card) 32'; Touré 57'; Vutov (yellow card) 90'; Ivanov (yellow card) 90+2'	Stadium: Ovcha Kupel Stadium; Attendance: 850; Referee: (Bulgaria) Tsvetan Krastev

5 October 2013 Match 12	Slavia Sofia	0 - 1	CSKA Sofia	Sofia
15:15	Atanasov (yellow card) 32'; Zhivko Zhelev (yellow card) 71'; Yanev (yellow card) 81'	Summary	Popov (yellow card) 34'; Iliev (yellow card) 38'; Gargorov 48'; Howard (yellow card) 79'; Marcinho (yellow card) 82'; Černý (yellow card) 90+5'	Stadium: Ovcha Kupel Stadium; Attendance: 1,100; Referee: (Bulgaria) Georgi Kabakov

20 October 2013 Match 13	Lokomotiv Plovdiv	3 - 1	Slavia Sofia	Plovdiv
16:00	Kamburov 6' (pen.); Diego Ferraresso (yellow card) 10'; Gadi 20'; N'Diaye (yellow card) 23' (goal) 48'; Iliadis (yellow card) 65'	Summary	Zhelev (red card) 5'; Fernando Silva (yellow card) 39'; Kurdov 46'	Stadium: Lokomotiv Stadium; Attendance: 1,600; Referee: (Bulgaria) Georgi Ignatov

25 October 2013 Match 14	Beroe	2 - 1	Slavia Sofia	Stara Zagora
17:00	David Caiado 29', 57'; Djoman (yellow card) 54'	Summary	Dimitrov (yellow card) 10'; Shalayev (yellow card) 40' (goal) 44'; Atanasov (yellow card) 42'	Stadium: Beroe Stadium; Attendance: 950; Referee: (Bulgaria) Hristo Ristoskov

30 October 2013 Match 15	Slavia Sofia	2 - 0	Cherno More	Sofia
15:00	Popara 34'; Kurdov (yellow card) 53' (goal) 83'; Atanasov (yellow card) 68'; Sandanski (yellow card) 77'; Petkov (yellow card) 78'	Summary	Kolev (yellow card) 26' (yellow-red card); Kitanov (yellow card) 32'; Aleksandrov (yellow card) 57'; Rasim (yellow card) 78'	Stadium: Ovcha Kupel Stadium; Attendance: 90; Referee: (Bulgaria) Dimitar Andreev

2 November 2013 Match 16	Ludogorets	4 - 0	Slavia Sofia	Razgrad
18:00	Bezjak 4', 6'; Marcelinho 16'; Burgzorg (yellow card) 42'; Daniel Abalo Paulos 71'	Summary	Fernando Silva (yellow card) 11'; Atanasov (yellow card) 38'	Stadium: Ludogorets Arena; Attendance: 1,200; Referee: (Bulgaria) Kalin Lyudmilov

9 November 2013 Match 17	Slavia Sofia	2 - 0	Neftochimic	Sofia
14:30	Yankov 3'; Shalayev (yellow card) 7'; Fernando Silva 31'; Genev (yellow card) 54'; Popara (yellow card) 78'	Summary	Hristov (yellow card) 30'; Dimitrov (yellow card) 85' (yellow-red card)	Stadium: Ovcha Kupel Stadium; Attendance: 200; Referee: (Bulgaria) Nikolay Yordanov

22 November 2013 Match 18	Lokomotiv Sofia	0 - 1	Slavia Sofia	Sofia
13:30	N’Lundulu (yellow card) 49'; Marquinhos (yellow card) 62'; Jovanović (yellow card) 66'	Summary	Shalayev (yellow card) 10'; Fernando Silva (yellow card) 45'; Pashov (yellow card) 74'; Ivanov 89'	Stadium: Lokomotiv Stadium; Attendance: 210; Referee: (Bulgaria) Georgie Yordanov

1 December 2013 Match 19	Slavia Sofia	1 - 2	Botev Plovdiv	Sofia
14:00	Kurdov 19'; Pashov (yellow card) 44'; Baning (yellow card) 73'	Summary	Andrianantenaina 31' (yellow card) 65'; Tsvetkov (yellow card) 34'; Vander Vieira 61'; Kortzorg (yellow card) 86'; Dyakov (yellow card) 90+2'	Stadium: Ovcha Kupel Stadium; Attendance: 420; Referee: (Bulgaria) Tsvetan Krastev

4 December 2013 Match 20	Pirin Gotse Delchev	1 - 3	Slavia Sofia	Gotse Delchev
14:00	Bashov 41' (yellow card) 64'; Fidanin (yellow card) 48'	Summary	Shalayev 4' (yellow card) 40'; Baning (yellow card) 22'; Yankov 24'; Kurdov 58'; Dimitrov (yellow card) 78'	Stadium: Gradski Stadion; Attendance: 410; Referee: (Bulgaria) Dimitar Andreev

7 December 2013 Match 21	Slavia Sofia	1 - 2	Litex Lovech	Sofia
13:00	Shalayev (yellow card) 49'; Fernando Silva (yellow card) 54'; Velkov 57' (yellow card) 66'; Baning (yellow card) 73'; Atanasov (yellow card) 75'	Summary	Vajushi 31' (yellow card) 44'; Popov (yellow card) 35' (goal) 74'; Gjasula (yellow card) 37'; Slavchev (yellow card) 55'; Nedyalkov (yellow card) 90+2'; Manolov (yellow card) 90+4'	Stadium: Ovcha Kupel Stadium; Attendance: 70; Referee: (Bulgaria) Nikola Popov

11 December 2013 Match 22	FC Lyubimets 2007	2 - 2	Slavia Sofia	Lyubimets
14:00	Ognyanov 6'; Shokolarov (yellow card) 36'; Budinov (yellow card) 54'; Valchanov 57'; Orlinov (yellow card) 80'; Mauro Alonso (yellow card) 87'	Summary	Velkov 7'; Petkov (yellow card) 24'; Kurdov (yellow card) 45'; Yankov 55' (pen.)	Stadium: Gradski Stadium; Attendance: 270; Referee: (Bulgaria) Stefan Pavlov

15 December 2013 Match 23	Slavia Sofia	2 - 0	Chernomorets Burgas	Sofia
14:00	Yankov 23'; Filipov 62' (o.g.); Ivanov (yellow card) 66'	Summary	Chico (yellow card) 69'; Gamakov (yellow card) 90+2'	Stadium: Ovcha Kupel Stadium; Attendance: 180; Referee: (Bulgaria) Georgi Kabakov

22 February 2014 Match 24	Levski Sofia	2 - 2	Slavia Sofia	Sofia
16:15	Makriev 69'; Krumov 80'	Summary	Kurdov 42'; Ristevski 74'	Stadium: Georgi Asparuhov Stadium

1 March 2014 Match 25	CSKA Sofia	3 - 0	Slavia Sofia	Sofia
16:15	Milisavljević 63'; Kossoko 79'; Toni Silva 82'	Summary	Panov (yellow card) 39' (yellow-red card); Dimitrov (yellow card) 52'	Stadium: Balgarska Armia Stadium; Attendance: 3,900; Referee: (Bulgaria) Georgi Dimitrov

9 March 2014 Match 26	Slavia Sofia	-	Lokomotiv Plovdiv	Sofia
15:00				Stadium: Ovcha Kupel Stadium

==== Relegation group ====
===== Table =====
Pos	Team	Pld	W	D	L	GF	GA	GD	Pts	Relegation
8	Beroe	38	21	7	10	58	29	+29	70	
9	Slavia Sofia	38	16	7	15	57	46	+11	55	
10	Lokomotiv Sofia	38	16	6	16	46	52	−6	54	
11	Chernomorets Burgas (R)	38	13	5	20	56	62	−6	44	Relegation to 2014–15 B Group
12	Neftochimic 1986 (R)	38	7	4	27	26	92	−66	25	Relegation to 2014–15 B Group

Source: A PFG (in Bulgarian)
Rules for classification: 1st points; 2nd head-to-head points; 3rd head-to-head goal difference; 4th head-to-head goals scored; 5th head-to-head away goals scored; 6th season goal difference; 7th season goals scored; 8th "sportsmanship" (R & Y cards); 9th draw
(R) Relegated

===== Results summary =====
Overall								Home						Away					
Pld	W	D	L	GF	GA	GD	Pts	W	D	L	GF	GA	GD	W	D	L	GF	GA	GD
12	8	0	4	22	8	+14	24	5	0	1	14	2	+12	3	0	3	8	6	+2

Last updated: 17 May 2014.
Source: Soccerway

=== Bulgarian Cup ===
18 September 2013 Round of 32 First Leg	Slavia Sofia	4 - 0	Pirin Razlog	Sofia
17:00	Fernando Silva 24'; Vasilev 42'; Kurdov 50'; Aleksandrov 66'	Summary		Stadium: Ovcha Kupel Stadium; Attendance: 200; Referee: (Bulgaria) Dimitar Andreev

12 October 2013 Round of 32 Second Leg	Pirin Razlog	1 - 4 (1 - 8 agg.)	Slavia Sofia	Razlog
15:00	Dušan Deljanin 45'	Summary	Popara 10'; Bahamboula 39'; Ivanov 65'; Kurdov 90+1'	Stadium: Gradski Stadium; Attendance: 400; Referee: (Bulgaria) Borislav Kolev

6 November 2013 Round of 16 First Leg	Lokomotiv Sofia	1 - 2	Slavia Sofia	Sofia
14:45	Sota 7'; Tom (yellow card) 53'; Hristov (yellow card) 62'	Summary	Yankov (yellow card) 50'; Velkov 53'; Kurdov (yellow card) 59' (goal) 82'	Stadium: Lokomotiv Stadium (Sofia); Attendance: 200; Referee: (Bulgaria) Tsvetan Krastev

15 November 2013 Round of 16 Second Leg	Slavia Sofia	0 - 2 (2 - 3 agg.)	Lokomotiv Sofia	Sofia
13:30	Sandanski (yellow card) 76'; Velkov (yellow card) 85'	Summary	Baseya 53'; Marquinhos (yellow card) 67'; Tom 80'; Sota (yellow card) 89'	Stadium: Ovcha Kupel Stadium; Attendance: 80; Referee: (Bulgaria) Kalin Lyudmilov
