= 2013–14 Bulgarian Cup =

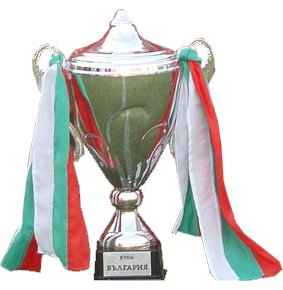
- Bulgarian Cup trophy

Tournament details
- Country: Bulgaria

Final positions
- Champions: Ludogorets Razgrad (2nd cup)
- Runners-up: Botev Plovdiv

The 2013–14 Bulgarian Cup was the 32nd official season of the Bulgarian annual football knockout tournament. The competition will begin on 18 September 2013 with the matches of the First Round and ended with the final on 15 May 2014. Beroe Stara Zagora were the defending champions, but lost to the eventual champions Ludogorets Razgrad in the second round.

The winners of the competition qualified for the second qualifying round of the 2014–15 UEFA Europa League.

== Participating clubs ==
The following teams competed in the cup:

2013–14 A Group all clubs	2013–14 B Group all clubs	Winners of 4 regional competitions
Ludogorets Razgrad; Levski Sofia; CSKA Sofia; Botev Plovdiv; Litex Lovech; Chernomorets Burgas; Beroe Stara Zagora; Slavia Sofia; Lokomotiv Plovdiv; Cherno More Varna; Pirin Gotse Delchev; Lokomotiv Sofia; Neftochimic Burgas; Lyubimets	Botev Vratsa; Montana; Rakovski 2011; Bansko; Spartak Varna; Kaliakra Kavarna; Pirin Razlog; Botev Galabovo; Dobrudzha Dobrich; Marek Dupnitsa; Akademik Svishtov; Haskovo; Dunav Ruse; Vitosha Bistritsa	from North-West zone: Vidima-Rakovski Sevlievo; from North-East zone: Shumen 2010; from South-East zone: Sozopol; from South-West zone: Oborishte Panagyurishte

== Bracket ==
Round 1
CSKA Sofia	6	2	7
Haskovo	1	1	3
Levski Sofia	4	5	9
Pirin Gotse Delchev	0	0	0
Marek Dupnitsa	0	0	0
Cherno More Varna	0	2	2
Botev Plovdiv	6	3	9
Neftochimic	0	0	0
Lokomotiv Sofia	2	3	5
Kaliakra Kavarna	1	0	1
Slavia Sofia	4	4	8
Pirin Razlog	0	1	1
Botev Vratsa	1	0	1(2 p.)
Montana	0	1	1(4 p.)
Shumen 2010	0	0	0
Chernomorets Burgas	9	4	13
Akademik Svishtov	0	1	1
Sozopol	2	1	3
Litex	5	3	8
Spartak Varna	1	2	3
Ludogorets Razgrad	4	2	6
Dunav Ruse	1	1	2
Beroe Stara Zagora	3	5	8
Vidima-Rakovski	0	2	2
Lyubimets	1	0	1
Lokomotiv Plovdiv	1	0	1
Bansko	1	0	1
Vitosha Bistritsa	1	2	2
Botev Galabovo	1	0	1
Rakovski 2011	0	2	2
Oborishte Panagyurishte	2	0	2
Dobrudzha Dobrich	2	1	3

Round 2
CSKA Sofia	0	0	0(6 p.)
Levski Sofia	0	0	0 (7 p.)
Cherno More Varna	0	0	0
Botev Plovdiv	0	1	1
Lokomotiv Sofia	1	2	3
Slavia Sofia	2	0	2
Montana	1	1	2
Chernomorets Burgas	3	0	3
Sozopol	1	0	1
Litex	2	6	8
Ludogorets Razgrad	2	1	3
Beroe Stara Zagora	1	1	2
Lokomotiv Plovdiv	5	0	5
Vitosha Bistritsa	0	1	1
Rakovski 2011	1	0	1
Dobrudzha Dobrich	1	4	5

Quarterfinals
Levski Sofia	3	0	3
Botev Plovdiv	1	2	3
Lokomotiv Sofia	1	3	4
Chernomorets Burgas	0	2	2
Litex	1	1	2
Ludogorets Razgrad	2	2	4
Dobrudzha Dobrich	0	0	0
Lokomotiv Plovdiv	3	2	5

Semifinals
Botev Plovdiv	3	1	4
Lokomotiv Sofia	1	0	1
Ludogorets Razgrad	2	0	2
Lokomotiv Plovdiv	0	1	1

Final
Botev Plovdiv	0
Ludogorets Razgrad	1

== First round ==
The draw will be conducted in September 2013. The first legs will be played on 18 September 2013, the second legs are on 23 October 2013. On this stage all of the participants start their participation i.e. the 14 teams from A PFG (first division), the 14 teams from the B PFG (second division) and the 4 winners from the regional amateur competitions.

Note: Roman numerals in brackets denote the league tier the clubs participate in during the 2013–14 season.

=== First legs ===
17 September 2013	CSKA Sofia (I)	6–2	Haskovo (II)	Sofia
17:30	Vasilev 7'; Marcinho 23' (pen.), 50'; Dolapchiev 30'; Sidibé 61'; Chochev 83'	Report	Uzunov 58'; Aleksiev 63'	Stadium: Balgarska Armiya; Attendance: 450; Referee: Tasko Taskov (Sofia)

18 September 2013	Shumen 2010 (III)	0–4	Chernomorets Burgas (I)	Shumen
17:00		Report	Yordanov 9', 85' (pen.); Angelov 34'; Soly 75'	Stadium: Panayot Volov; Attendance: 600; Referee: Georgi Davidov (Veliko Tarnovo)

18 September 2013	Akademik Svishtov (II)	0–2	Sozopol (III)	Svishtov
17:00		Report	Sherdenov 56'; Tsekov 69'	Stadium: Akademik; Attendance: 400; Referee: Martin Aleksandrov

18 September 2013	Bansko (II)	1–1	Vitosha Bistritsa (II)	Bansko
17:00	Chipilov 34'	Report	Sadula 86'	Stadium: St. Peter; Attendance: 300; Referee: Kalin Lyudmilov (Sofia)

18 September 2013	Marek Dupnitsa (II)	0–0	Cherno More Varna (I)	Dupnitsa
17:00		Report		Stadium: Bonchuk; Attendance: 1,200; Referee: Martin Bogdev

18 September 2013	Lyubimets (I)	1–1	Lokomotiv Plovdiv (I)	Lyubimets
17:00	Velichkov 35'	Report	Todorov 59' (pen.)	Stadium: Gradski; Attendance: 300; Referee: Stefan Apostolov

18 September 2013	Beroe Stara Zagora (I)	3–0	Vidima-Rakovski Sevlievo (III)	Stara Zagora
17:00	Caiado 1'; Stoychev 42'; Zehirov 50'	Report		Stadium: Beroe; Attendance: 650; Referee: Radan Miryanov

18 September 2013	Oborishte Panagyurishte (III)	2–2	Dobrudzha Dobrich (II)	Panagyurishte
17:00	Lachov 72'; Enchev 90+2'	Report	Dimitrov 21'; Tsachev 50'	Stadium: Orcho Voyvoda; Attendance: 800; Referee: Adriyan Petrov

18 September 2013	Slavia Sofia (I)	4–0	Pirin Razlog (II)	Sofia
17:00	Silva 24'; Vasilev 42'; Kurdov 50'; Aleksandrov 66'	Report		Stadium: Ovcha Kupel; Attendance: 200; Referee: Dimitar Andreev

18 September 2013	Botev Vratsa (II)	1–0	Montana (II)	Vratsa
17:00	Tsonev 90+1'	Report		Stadium: Hristo Botev; Attendance: 500; Referee: Vladimir Valkov

18 September 2013	Botev Galabovo (II)	1–0	Rakovski 2011 (II)	Galabovo
17:00	Kirilov 38'	Report		Stadium: Energetik; Attendance: 450; Referee: Stoyan Denev

18 September 2013	Botev Plovdiv (I)	6–0	Neftochimic Burgas (I)	Plovdiv
17:00	Pedro 22', 38', 84'; Abel 35'; Kostov 72', 83'	Report		Stadium: Hristo Botev; Attendance: 1,500; Referee: Stanislav Stavrov

18 September 2013	Levski Sofia (I)	4–0	Pirin Gotse Delchev (I)	Sofia
17:30	Vutov 26'; Rodrigues 44'; Yordanov 73'; Tsonev 88'	Report		Stadium: Georgi Asparuhov; Attendance: 650; Referee: Georgi Dimitrov

18 September 2013	Litex Lovech (I)	5–1	Spartak Varna (II)	Lovech
18:00	Despodov 28'; Kolev 39'; Tsvetkov 45'; Zlatinov 47'; Manolov 60'	Report	Ganchev 76'	Stadium: Lovech; Attendance: 350; Referee: Martin Stoimenov

18 September 2013	Lokomotiv Sofia (I)	2–1	Kaliakra Kavarna (II)	Sofia
19:00	Pisarov 29' (pen.), 87'	Report	Raychev 37' (pen.)	Stadium: Lokomotiv; Attendance: 450; Referee: Stanislav Todorov

9 October 2013	Ludogorets Razgrad (I)	4–1	Dunav Ruse (II)	Razgrad
18:00	Platini 16'; Marcelinho 34'; Barthe 56'; Abalo 77'	Report	Dimov 65'	Stadium: Ludogorets Arena; Attendance: 1,600; Referee: Dragomir Draganov

=== Second legs ===
9 October 2013	Chernomorets Burgas (I)	9–0 (13–0 agg.)	Shumen 2010 (III)	Burgas
14:00	Atanasov 7'; Ammari 20'; Angelov 34', 39', 45', 69', 90'; Pavlov 51'; Dryanov 59'	Report		Stadium: Lazur; Attendance: 300; Referee: Boyan Slavkov

10 October 2013	Vidima-Rakovski Sevlievo (III)	2–5 (2–8 agg.)	Beroe Stara Zagora (I)	Stara Zagora
15:00	Kolarov 87'; Krachunov 88'	Report	Dinkov 21', 26' (pen.); Andonov 60'; Martins 70', 90+2'	Stadium: Trace Arena; Attendance: 500; Referee: Radoslav Stanev

12 October 2013	Rakovski 2011 (II)	2–0 (a.e.t.) (2–1 agg.)	Botev Galabovo (II)	Rakovski
14:00	Marin 65'; Pavlov 94'	Report		Stadium: Legia; Attendance: 300; Referee: Stefan Pavlov

12 October 2013	Haskovo (II)	1–1 (3–7 agg.)	CSKA Sofia (I)	Haskovo
14:00	Lozev 50'	Report	Kirovski 62'	Stadium: Gradski; Attendance: 2,500; Referee: Stefan Apostolov

12 October 2013	Cherno More Varna (I)	2–0 (2–0 agg.)	Marek Dupnitsa (II)	Varna
15:00	Kokonov 16'; Georgiev 70'	Report		Stadium: Ticha; Attendance: 900; Referee: Stoyan Denev

12 October 2013	Pirin Razlog (II)	1–4 (1–8 agg.)	Slavia Sofia (I)	Razlog
15:00	Deljanin 45+1'	Report	Popara 7'; Bahamboula 38'; Ivanov 65'; Kurdov 90+1'	Stadium: Pirin; Attendance: 400; Referee: Borislav Kolev

12 October 2013	Montana (II)	1–0 (1–1 agg.) (4–2 p)	Botev Vratsa (II)	Montana
15:00	Michev 87'	Report		Stadium: Ogosta; Attendance: 300; Referee: Tasko Taskov
	Penalties
	Ivanov (penalty scored); Michev (penalty scored); Iliev (penalty scored); Antonov (penalty scored); Mihov (penalty missed)		(penalty scored) Alyoshev; (penalty scored) Velev; (penalty missed) Kirov; (penalty missed) Iliev

12 October 2013	Neftochimic Burgas (I)	0–3 (0–9 agg.)	Botev Plovdiv (I)	Plovdiv
15:00		Report	Domovchiyski 38'; Pedro 64'; Tsvetkov 76'	Stadium: Hristo Botev; Attendance: 1,300; Referee: Martin Stoimenov

12 October 2013	Spartak Varna (II)	2–3 (3–8 agg.)	Litex Lovech (I)	Varna
15:00	Ganchev 28'; Beadirov 44' (pen.)	Report	Manolov 33', 40' (pen.); Tsvetanov 43'	Stadium: Spartak; Attendance: 250; Referee: Dimitar Andreev

12 October 2013	Kaliakra Kavarna (II)	0–3 (1–5 agg.)	Lokomotiv Sofia (I)	Kavarna
15:00		Report	Pisarov 28'; Bibishkov 36', 57'	Stadium: Kavarna; Attendance: 200; Referee: Kalin Lyudmilov (Sofia)

12 October 2013	Dunav Ruse (II)	1–2 (2–6 agg.)	Ludogorets Razgrad (I)	Ruse
15:00	Kaptiev 90+2'	Report	Misidjan 64'; Aleksandrov 76'	Stadium: Gradski; Attendance: 2,000; Referee: Ivan Kirilov

12 October 2013	Pirin Gotse Delchev (I)	0–5 (0–9 agg.)	Levski Sofia (I)	Gotse Delchev
16:00		Report	Starokin 13'; Rodrigues 48', 69'; Genkov 54', 71'	Stadium: Gradski; Attendance: 600; Referee: Nikolay Yordanov

13 October 2013	Vitosha Bistritsa (II)	2–0 (3–1 agg.)	Bansko (II)	Sofia
15:00	Sadula 7'; Petrov 79' (pen.)	Report		Stadium: Lokomotiv; Attendance: 150; Referee: Nikola Popov

13 October 2013	Lokomotiv Plovdiv (I)	0–0 (1a–1 agg.)	Lyubimets (I)	Plovdiv
15:00		Report		Stadium: Lokomotiv; Attendance: 1,000; Referee: Vihren Manev

23 October 2013	Sozopol (III)	1−1 (3−1 agg.)	Akademik Svishtov (II)	Sozopol
15:00	Hadzhiev 7'	Report	Rusev 75' (pen.)	Stadium: Gradski; Attendance: 1,000; Referee: Atanas Kostadinov

23 October 2013	Dobrudzha Dobrich (II)	1−0 (3−2 agg.)	Oborishte Panagyurishte (III)	Dobrich
15:00	Dimitrov 2'	Report		Stadium: Druzhba; Attendance: 300; Referee: Mihail Yordanov

== Second round ==
The draw was conducted on 16 October 2013. The first legs will be played on 6 November 2013, the second legs are on 27 November 2013. On this stage the participants will be the 16 winners from the second round.

Note: Roman numerals in brackets denote the league tier the clubs participate in during the 2013–14 season.

=== First legs ===
6 November 2013	Sozopol (III)	1–2	Litex Lovech (I)	Sozopol
14:30	Baev 11'	Report	Bozhikov 22'; Tsvetkov 76'	Stadium: Gradski; Attendance: 1,250; Referee: Stoyan Denev (Veliko Tarnovo)

6 November 2013	Lokomotiv Sofia (I)	1–2	Slavia Sofia (I)	Sofia
14:45	Sota 7'	Report	S. Velkov 53'; Kurdov 82'	Stadium: Lokomotiv; Attendance: 200; Referee: Tsvetan Krastev (Varna)

7 November 2013	Cherno More Varna (I)	0–0	Botev Plovdiv (I)	Varna
14:45		Report		Stadium: Ticha; Attendance: 1,230; Referee: Nikola Popov (Sofia)

7 November 2013	Lokomotiv Plovdiv (I)	5–0	Vitosha Bistritsa (II)	Plovdiv
16:00	A. Belaïd 24'; Yovchev 40', 43'; Gadi 51'; Stefanov 71'	Report		Stadium: Lokomotiv; Attendance: 820; Referee: Atanas Dimitrov (Sliven)

13 November 2013	Montana (II)	1−3	Chernomorets Burgas (I)	Montana
14:30	Antonov 90+2'	Report	Angelov 14'; Atanasov 51'; Ammari 58'	Stadium: Ogosta; Attendance: 230; Referee: Georgi Davidov (Veliko Tarnovo)

14 November 2013	Ludogorets Razgrad (I)	2–1	Beroe Stara Zagora (I)	Razgrad
18:00	Moţi 45+4'; Aleksandrov 60'	Report	I. Ivanov 21'	Stadium: Ludogorets Arena; Attendance: 2,270; Referee: Aleksandar Kostadinov (Sofia)

16 November 2013	Rakovski 2011 (II)	1−1	Dobrudzha (II)	Rakovski
14:30	Chunchukov 19'	Report	Georgiev 16'	Stadium: Legia; Attendance: 150; Referee: Stanislav Stavrov (Veliko Tarnovo)

16 November 2013	CSKA Sofia (I)	0−0	Levski Sofia (I)	Sofia
15:15		Report		Stadium: Vasil Levski; Attendance: 11,670; Referee: Tsvetan Krastev (Varna)

=== Second legs ===
15 November 2013	Slavia Sofia (I)	0−2 (2−3 agg.)	Lokomotiv Sofia (I)	Sofia
13:30		Report	Baseya 53'; Tom 80'	Stadium: Ovcha Kupel; Attendance: 80; Referee: Kalin Lyudmilov (Sofia)

16 November 2013	Vitosha Bistritsa (II)	1−0 (1−5 agg.)	Lokomotiv Plovdiv (I)	Plovdiv
13:15	Sadula 13'	Report		Stadium: Lokomotiv; Attendance: 530; Referee: Nikolay Yordanov (Sofia)

17 November 2013	Botev Plovdiv (I)	1−0 (1−0 agg.)	Cherno More Varna (I)	Plovdiv
13:30	Luís Pedro 90'	Report		Stadium: Hristo Botev; Attendance: 3,260; Referee: Vihren Manev (Sofia)

17 November 2013	Chernomorets Burgas (I)	0−1 (3−2 agg.)	Montana (II)	Burgas
13:30		Report	Michev 7'	Stadium: Lazur; Attendance: 230; Referee: Angel Angelov (Sofia)

17 November 2013	Beroe Stara Zagora (I)	1−1 (2−3 agg.)	Ludogorets Razgrad (I)	Stara Zagora
18:00	Hristov 41'	Report	Iliev 4' (o.g.)	Stadium: Beroe; Attendance: 3,440; Referee: Georgi Kabakov (Plovdiv)

19 November 2013	Litex Lovech (I)	6–0 (8–1 agg.)	Sozopol (III)	Lovech
14:00	Vajushi 9'; Gjasula 29', 85'; Jordán 33'; Manolov 50'; Vanger 64'	Report		Stadium: Lovech; Attendance: 800; Referee: Georgi Yordanov (Gabrovo)

23 November 2013	Dobrudzha (II)	4−0 (5−1 agg.)	Rakovski 2011 (II)	Dobrich
13:30	Simeonov 15' (pen.); Dimitrov 32'; Tsachev 62'; Dimitrov 81'	Report		Stadium: Druzhba; Attendance: 200; Referee: Radan Miryanov (Varna)

19 December 2013	Levski Sofia (I)	0−0 (a.e.t.) (0−0 agg.) (7−6 p)	CSKA Sofia (I)	Sofia
16:00		Report		Stadium: Vasil Levski; Attendance: 8,540; Referee: Tsvetan Krastev (Varna)
	Penalties
	Rodrigues (penalty scored); Makriev (penalty scored); Touré (penalty missed); Angelov (penalty scored); Vutov (penalty scored); Dimov (penalty scored); Bru (penalty missed); Pérez (penalty scored); Mulder (penalty scored)		(penalty missed) Gargorov; (penalty scored) Karachanakov; (penalty scored) Yanchev; (penalty scored) Popov; (penalty scored) Chochev; (penalty scored) Vasilev; (penalty missed) Iliev; (penalty scored) Mendy; (penalty missed) Sidibé

== Quarter-finals ==
The draw was conducted on 26 November 2013. The first legs will be played on 12 March 2014, the second legs are on 19 March 2014. On this stage the participants will be the 8 winners from the third round.

Note: Roman numerals in brackets denote the league tier the clubs participated in during the 2013–14 season. Teams that are mentioned first will be playing at home in the first game and away in the second.

=== First legs ===
12 March 2014	Dobrudzha Dobrich (II)	0−3	Lokomotiv Plovdiv (I)	Dobrich
14:00		Report	Lazarov 31'; N'Diaye 51'; Gadi 75'	Stadium: Druzhba; Attendance: 1,360; Referee: Georgi Davidov (Veliko Tarnovo)

12 March 2014	Levski Sofia (I)	3–1	Botev Plovdiv (I)	Sofia
16:15	Cristóvão 15'; Mulder 25'; Bojinov 49'	Report	Doré 13'	Stadium: Georgi Asparuhov; Attendance: 2,250; Referee: Tsvetan Krastev (Varna)

13 March 2014	Lokomotiv Sofia (I)	1–0	Chernomorets Burgas (I)	Sofia
14:00	Branekov 5'	Report		Stadium: Lokomotiv; Attendance: 150; Referee: Georgi Kabakov (Plovdiv)

16 March 2014	Litex Lovech (I)	1−2	Ludogorets Razgrad (I)	Lovech
19:30	Manolov 70'	Report	Zlatinski 13'; Moți 25'	Stadium: Lovech; Attendance: 1,850; Referee: Nikola Popov (Sofia)

=== Second legs ===
19 March 2014	Botev Plovdiv (I)	2−0 (3a–3 agg.)	Levski Sofia (I)	Plovdiv
14:00	Pedro 50'; Doré 72'	Report		Stadium: Botev 1912 Football Complex; Attendance: 2,850; Referee: Stanislav Todorov (Shumen)

19 March 2014	Chernomorets Burgas (I)	2−3 (2−4 agg.)	Lokomotiv Sofia (I)	Burgas
18:00	Fonseca 38'; Baltanov 55'	Report	Ranđelović 68'; Marquinhos 73'; Genov 90+3'	Stadium: Lazur; Attendance: 230; Referee: Ivaylo Stoyanov (Petrich)

20 March 2014	Lokomotiv Plovdiv (I)	2–0 (5–0 agg.)	Dobrudzha Dobrich (II)	Plovdiv
16:00	Mendes 28'; Gadi 62'	Report		Stadium: Lokomotiv; Attendance: 400; Referee: Stefan Pavlov (Burgas)

2 April 2014	Ludogorets Razgrad (I)	2−1 (4−2 agg.)	Litex Lovech (I)	Razgrad
18:00	Moți 45+1'; Nikolov 68' (o.g.)	Report	Tsvetanov 35'	Stadium: Ludogorets Arena; Attendance: 2,700; Referee: Stanislav Todorov (Shumen)

== Semi-finals ==
The draw was conducted on 3 April 2014. The matches will be played on 16 and 23 April 2014. At this stage the participants will be the four winners from the quarter-finals.

Note: Roman numerals in brackets denote the league tier the clubs participated in during the 2013–14 season.

=== First legs ===
16 April 2014	Botev Plovdiv (I)	3–1	Lokomotiv Sofia (I)	Plovdiv
16:15	Doré 38'; Pedro 72'; Branekov 85' (o.g.)	Report	Ivanov 88'	Stadium: Botev 1912 Football Complex; Attendance: 2,100; Referee: Stanislav Todorov (Shumen)

16 April 2014	Ludogorets (I)	2–0	Lokomotiv Plovdiv (I)	Razgrad
18:00	Lumu 44'; Zlatinski 65' (pen.)	Report		Stadium: Ludogorets Arena; Attendance: 1,620; Referee: Hristo Ristoskov (Sandanski)

=== Second legs ===
23 April 2014	Lokomotiv Sofia (I)	0–1 (1–4 agg.)	Botev Plovdiv (I)	Sofia
16:00		Report	Hamza 61' (pen.)	Stadium: Lokomotiv; Attendance: 630; Referee: Georgi Yordanov (Gabrovo)

23 April 2014	Lokomotiv Plovdiv (I)	1–0 (1–2 agg.)	Ludogorets (I)	Plovdiv
18:00	Kamburov 59'	Report		Stadium: Lokomotiv; Attendance: 0 Referee: Kalin Lyudmilov (Sofia)

== Final ==
15 May 2014
19:15 EEST

Botev Plovdiv	0–1	Ludogorets Razgrad
		Bezjak 58'

Lazur Stadium, Burgas
Attendance: 13,250
Referee: Georgi Yordanov (Gabrovo)

== See also ==
- 2013–14 A Group
- 2013–14 B Group
- 2013–14 V AFG
