= 2014–15 PFC Slavia Sofia season =

Bulgarian football club season

PFC Slavia Sofia (Bulgarian: ПФК Славия София) is a Bulgarian football club founded on 10 April 1913 in Sofia. Slavia's ground is Slavia Stadium with a capacity of 15,992. The team's colours are white and black. During the 2014/15 campaign they took part in the following competitions: A PFG, Bulgarian Cup.

== Competitions ==
=== A Group ===
==== First phase ====
===== Table =====
Pos	Team	Pld	W	D	L	GF	GA	GD	Pts	Qualification
7	Levski Sofia	22	10	4	8	36	25	+11	34	Qualification for relegation group
8	Cherno More Varna	22	9	4	9	26	24	+2	31	Qualification for relegation group
9	Slavia Sofia	22	6	5	11	24	30	−6	23	Qualification for relegation group
10	Lokomotiv Plovdiv	22	5	5	12	13	36	−23	20	Qualification for relegation group
11	Marek Dupnitsa	22	3	5	14	8	45	−37	14	Qualification for relegation group

Source: bulgarian-football.com
Rules for classification: 1st points; 2nd head-to-head points; 3rd head-to-head goal difference; 4th head-to-head goals scored; 5th head-to-head away goals scored; 6th season goal difference; 7th season goals scored; 8th "sportsmanship" (R & Y cards); 9th draw

===== Results summary =====
Overall								Home						Away					
Pld	W	D	L	GF	GA	GD	Pts	W	D	L	GF	GA	GD	W	D	L	GF	GA	GD
22	6	5	11	24	30	−6	23	4	1	6	15	18	−3	2	4	5	9	12	−3

Last updated: 17 March 2015.
Source: Soccerway

===== Matches =====
19 July 2014 Match 1	Slavia Sofia	4–1	Marek	Sofia
18:30	Fonseca 1'; Michel Platini Mesquita 15' (pen.); Genchev (yellow card) 31' (goal) 38'; Manzorro (yellow card) 61'; Fernando Silva (yellow card) 79'; Bijev 90+4'	Summary	Tonchev 54'; Lahchev (yellow card) 58'; Bibishkov (yellow card) 59'; Dikov (yellow card) 80'	Stadium: Slavia Stadium; Attendance: 480; Referee: (Bulgaria) Georgi Dimitrov

26 July 2014 Match 2	Lokomotiv Plovdiv	1–1	Slavia Sofia	Plovdiv
20:00	Dyakov (yellow card) 23'; Kiki 30'; Stamov (yellow card) 76'; Gospodinov (yellow card) 87'	Summary	Michel Platini Mesquita 51'; Panov (yellow card) 54'; Pirgov (yellow card) 90+3'	Stadium: Lokomotiv Stadium; Attendance: 4,100; Referee: (Bulgaria) Stanislav Todorov

3 August 2014 Match 3	Slavia Sofia	2–2	CSKA Sofia	Sofia
18:00	Burgzorg 42'; Pirgov (yellow card) 60'; Michel Platini Mesquita 62'; Vezalov (yellow card) 83'; Ristevski (yellow card) 87'	Summary	Buș 9'; Supusepa (yellow card) 48'; Tunchev 55'; Galchev (yellow card) 78'; Toni Silva (yellow card) 81'; Popov (yellow card) 90'	Stadium: Slavia Stadium; Attendance: 3,600; Referee: (Bulgaria) Nikola Popov

9 August 2014 Match 4	Lokomotiv Sofia	1–0	Slavia Sofia	Sofia
18:00	Ranđelović (yellow card) 34'; Ivanov 45+2'	Summary	Burgzorg (yellow card) 45+1'; Fernando Silva (yellow card) 77'; Panov (yellow card) 79'	Stadium: Lokomotiv Stadium; Attendance: 550; Referee: (Bulgaria) Tasko Taskov

16 August 2014 Match 5	Slavia Sofia	0–2	Beroe	Sofia
18:00	Vezalov (yellow card) 30'	Summary	Kerkar 19'; Hristov 43'; Zafirov (yellow card) 74'	Stadium: Slavia Stadium; Attendance: 380; Referee: (Bulgaria) Georgi Kabakov

24 August 2014 Match 6	Botev Plovdiv	2–0	Slavia Sofia	Plovdiv
16:45	Jirsák 13'; Ognyanov (yellow card) 41'; Baltanov 53'; Gamakov (yellow card) 75'	Summary	Fernando Silva (yellow card) 41'; Manzorro (yellow card) 63'	Stadium: Hristo Botev Stadium; Attendance: 2,900; Referee: (Bulgaria) Ivaylo Stoyanov

30 August 2014 Match 7	Slavia Sofia	0–2	Litex Lovech	Sofia
17:30	Burgzorg (yellow card) 34'; Stoyanov (yellow card) 50'; Fernando Silva (yellow card) 78'	Summary	Kossoko 23' (yellow card) 59'; Milanov (yellow card) 65'; Pirgov 90+4' (o.g.)	Stadium: Slavia Stadium; Attendance: 300; Referee: (Bulgaria) Nikola Popov

14 September 2014 Match 8	Levski Sofia	2–0	Slavia Sofia	Sofia
20:15 EET	Krumov (yellow card) 5'; Procházka 85'; Stoychev (yellow card) 90'; Añete 90+3'	Summary	Burgzorg (yellow card) 35'; Pirgov (yellow card) 88'	Stadium: Georgi Asparuhov Stadium; Referee: (Bulgaria) Tasko Taskov

19 September 2014 Match 9	Slavia Sofia	1–3	Cherno More	Sofia
17:00 EET	Michel Platini Mesquita 56' (yellow card) 89'; Manzorro (yellow card) 90+3'	Summary	Petkov 9' (yellow card) 65'; Kokonov 52'; Sténio (yellow card) 88'; Rasim (yellow card) 90+1'; Raykov 90+4'	Stadium: Slavia Stadium; Attendance: 150; Referee: (Bulgaria) Georgie Yordanov

28 September 2014 Match 10	Slavia Sofia	1–0	Haskovo	Sofia
17:00 EET	Burgzorg (yellow card) 51'; Ferraresso (yellow card) 71'; Vasilev 73'	Summary	Eugénio (yellow card) 27'; Raynov (yellow card) 80'; Aleksiev (yellow card) 90'	Stadium: Slavia Stadium; Attendance: 150; Referee: (Bulgaria) Stanislav Stavrov

4 October 2014 Match 11	Ludogorets Razgrad	0–0	Slavia Sofia	Razgrad
20:00 EET	Choco (yellow card) 63'; Moți (yellow card) 90'	Summary	Ferraresso (yellow card) 50'; Vasilev (yellow card) 54'; Burgzorg (yellow card) 62'; Fernando Silva (yellow card) 64'; Valchanov (yellow card) 86'; Petkov (yellow card) 87'; Pirgov (yellow card) 90'	Stadium: Ludogorets Arena; Attendance: 2,300; Referee: (Bulgaria) Vladimir Valkov

19 October 2014 Match 12	Marek	0–2	Slavia Sofia	Dupnitsa
16:00 EET	Iliev (yellow card) 36'; Krastovchev (yellow card) 84'	Summary	Panov (yellow card) 20'; Vasilev 47'; Vezalov (yellow card) 52'; Michel 73'; Manzorro (yellow card) 82'	Stadium: Bonchuk Stadium; Attendance: 1,500; Referee: (Bulgaria) Tsvetan Krastev

24 October 2014 Match 13	Slavia Sofia	0–2	Lokomotiv Plovdiv	Sofia
16:00 EET	Savić (yellow card) 42'; Fernando Silva (yellow card) 45'; Panov (red card) 72'; Petkov (yellow card) 72'	Summary	Granchov (yellow card) 25'; Kamburov 48' 79'; Sandanski (yellow card) 58'; Kiki (yellow card) 77'; Valchev (yellow card) 87'	Stadium: Slavia Stadium; Attendance: 130; Referee: (Bulgaria) Angel Bayalcaliev

1 November 2014 Match 14	CSKA Sofia	0–0	Slavia Sofia	Sofia
17:30 EET	Vasilev (yellow card) 73'; Galchev (yellow card) 86'; Toni Silva (yellow card) 90'	Summary	Valchanov (yellow card) 19'; Fernando Silva (yellow card) 43'; Ristevski (yellow card) 46'; Petrov (yellow card) 85'; Pirgov (yellow card) 90'	Stadium: Balgarska Armia Stadium; Attendance: 1,810; Referee: (Bulgaria) Stanislav Stavrov

==== Relegation round ====
===== Table =====
Pos	Team	Pld	W	D	L	GF	GA	GD	Pts	Qualification or relegation
7	Levski Sofia	32	17	5	10	66	33	+33	56	
8	Cherno More	32	15	5	12	42	36	+6	50	Qualification for Europa League second qualifying round (Note: Cherno More Varna qualified for the 2015–16 UEFA Europa League second qualifying round by winning the 2014–15 Bulgarian Cup.)
9	Slavia Sofia	32	12	7	13	40	38	+2	43	
10	Lokomotiv Plovdiv	32	9	5	18	28	52	−24	32	
11	Marek (R)	32	5	5	22	14	71	−57	20	Relegation to 2015-16 V Group
12	Haskovo (R)	32	4	3	25	18	71	−53	15	Relegation to 2015-16 V Group

Source: bulgarian-football.com, UEFA.com (in English)
Rules for classification: 1st points; 2nd head-to-head points; 3rd head-to-head goal difference; 4th head-to-head goals scored; 5th head-to-head away goals scored; 6th season goal difference; 7th season goals scored; 8th "sportsmanship" (R & Y cards); 9th draw
(R) Relegated

===== Results summary =====
Overall								Home						Away					
Pld	W	D	L	GF	GA	GD	Pts	W	D	L	GF	GA	GD	W	D	L	GF	GA	GD
10	6	2	2	16	8	+8	20	3	1	1	9	3	+6	3	1	1	7	5	+2

Last updated: 27 May 2015.
Source: Soccerway
