= 2015–16 PFC Slavia Sofia season =

Bulgarian football club season

PFC Slavia Sofia (Bulgarian: ПФК Славия София) is a Bulgarian football club founded on 10 April 1913 in Sofia. Slavia's ground is Ovcha Kupel Stadium with a capacity of 25,556. The team's colours are white and black.

== Competitions ==
=== A Group ===
==== League table ====
Pos	Team	Pld	W	D	L	GF	GA	GD	Pts	Qualification or relegation
2	Levski Sofia	32	16	8	8	36	18	+18	56	Qualification for the Europa League second qualifying round
3	Beroe	32	14	11	7	37	27	+10	53	Qualification for the Europa League first qualifying round
4	Slavia Sofia	32	14	7	11	36	29	+7	49 (Note: Slavia Sofia ahead of Lokomotiv Plovdiv on head-to-head record; Slavia Sofia–Lokomotiv Plovdiv 3–0, Lokomotiv Plovdiv–Slavia Sofia 2–0, Slavia Sofia–Lokomotiv Plovdiv 3–0, Lokomotiv Plovdiv–Slavia Sofia 3–1.)	Qualification for the Europa League first qualifying round
5	Lokomotiv Plovdiv	32	15	4	13	40	45	−5	49	
6	Cherno More	32	10	8	14	36	45	−9	38	

Source: Bulgarian Football Association, Soccerway
Rules for classification: 1) Points; 2) Head-to-head points; 3) Head-to-head goal difference; 4) Head-to-head goals scored; 5) Head-to-head away goals scored (only if two teams); 6) Goal difference; 7) Goals scored; 8) Fairplay ranking; 9) Draw.

===== Results summary =====
Overall								Home						Away					
Pld	W	D	L	GF	GA	GD	Pts	W	D	L	GF	GA	GD	W	D	L	GF	GA	GD
32	14	7	11	36	29	+7	49	6	5	5	14	11	+3	8	2	6	22	18	+4

Last updated: 28 May 2016.
Source: Soccerway

==== Matches ====
17 July 2015 Match 1	Slavia Sofia	3 - 0	Lokomotiv Plovdiv	Sofia
18:30	Dimitrov 68' 90'; Valchanov 76'	Summary	Kiki (yellow card) 44'; Kamburov (yellow card) 48'; Krumov (yellow card) 58'	Stadium: Slavia Stadium; Attendance: 340; Referee: (Bulgaria) Vihren Manev

27 July 2015 Match 2	Pirin Blagoevgrad	0 - 3	Slavia Sofia	Blagoevgrad
21:00	Tasev (yellow card) 20'; Bengyuzov (yellow card) 36'; Viyachki (yellow card) 42'; Dyakov (yellow card) 62'; Marquinhos (yellow card) 62'	Summary	Panov (yellow card) 38'; Dimitrov (yellow card) 41' (goal) 77'; Manzorro 43' (pen.) 84'; Diego (yellow card) 45+2'; Petkov (yellow card) 69'; Dyakov (yellow card) 73'; Semerdzhiev (yellow card) 89'	Stadium: Hristo Botev Stadium; Attendance: 4,100; Referee: (Bulgaria) Georgi Kabakov

2 August 2015 Match 3	Slavia Sofia	0 - 1	Cherno More	Sofia
18:30	Pirgov (yellow card) 47'; Martinov (yellow card) 66'	Summary	Bijev 17' (yellow card) 72'; Coureur (yellow card) 27'; Raykov (yellow card) 41'; Trayanov (yellow card) 42'; Klok (yellow card) 45'; Georgiev (yellow card) 80'; Bourabia (red card) 85'	Stadium: Slavia Stadium; Attendance: 230; Referee: (Bulgaria) Vladimir Valkov

9 August 2015 Match 4	Slavia Sofia	0 - 0	Beroe	Sofia
17:30	Martinov (yellow card) 26'; Diego (yellow card) 47'; Manzorro (yellow card) 63'	Summary	Elias (red card) 5'; Ivanov (yellow card) 26'; Filipov (yellow card) 63'	Stadium: Slavia Stadium; Attendance: 280; Referee: (Bulgaria) Ivaylo Stoyanov

16 August 2015 Match 5	Botev Plovdiv	0 - 1	Slavia Sofia	Plovdiv
17:30	Baltanov (yellow card) 39'; Terziev (yellow card) 45+2'; Hristov (yellow card) 45+3'	Summary	Diego (yellow card) 32'; Kirev (yellow card) 45+2'; Manzorro (yellow card) 45+2'; Dimitov 60'; Manset (yellow card) 90'	Stadium: Hristo Botev Stadium; Attendance: 1,900; Referee: (Bulgaria) Nikola Popov

23 August 2015 Match 6	Slavia Sofia	0 - 0	Litex Lovech	Sofia
17:30	Dechev (yellow card) 45'; Krachunov (yellow card) 72'; Semerdzhiev (yellow card) 90'; Diego (yellow card) 90+1'	Summary	Galabov (yellow card) 27'; Moreno (yellow card) 68'; Tsvetkov (yellow card) 70'; Pérez (yellow card) 90+3'	Stadium: Slavia Stadium; Attendance: 370; Referee: (Bulgaria) Tasko Taskov
