= Stefan Velkov =

Bulgarian footballer (born 1996)

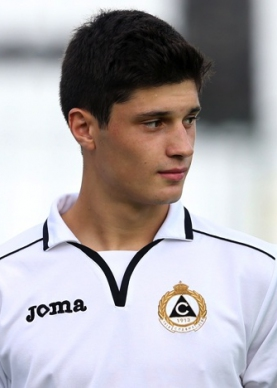
- Velkov with Slavia Sofia in 2013

Personal information
- Full name: Stefan Ivov Velkov
- Date of birth: 12 December 1996 (age 29)
- Place of birth: Sofia, Bulgaria
- Height: 1.90 m (6 ft 3 in)
- Position: Centre-back

Team information
- Current team: Sønderjyske
- Number: 21

Youth career
- 2005–2013: Slavia Sofia

Senior career*
Years	Team	Apps	(Gls)
2013–2018	Slavia Sofia	86	(2)
2018–2020	Den Bosch	41	(4)
2020	→ RKC Waalwijk (loan)	3	(0)
2020–2021	KFC Uerdingen	5	(0)
2021–2022	MSV Duisburg	19	(0)
2022–2026	Vejle	102	(8)
2026–	Sønderjyske	6	(1)

International career^{‡}
2011–2012	Bulgaria U16	5	(0)
2012–2013	Bulgaria U17	21	(1)
2013	Bulgaria U19	3	(0)
2013–2018	Bulgaria U21	20	(2)
2020–	Bulgaria	8	(0)
- * Club domestic league appearances and goals as of 16 November 2026 ‡ National team caps and goals as of 20:03, 16 November 2026 (UTC)

Stefan Ivov Velkov (Bulgarian: Стефан Ивов Велков; born 12 December 1996) is a Bulgarian professional footballer who plays as a centre-back for Danish Superliga club Sønderjyske.

== Career ==
=== Slavia Sofia ===
Born in Sofia, Velkov began his football career with Slavia Sofia in 2005. He made his first-team debut on 27 July 2013, at 16 years 227 days, coming on as a substitute for Hristo Yanev in a 0–0 away league draw against Cherno More Varna. On 18 December 2013, it was reported that Velkov was on trial with Manchester United. After the great debut season and a few trials in big European teams, Velkov got a serious injury, which took him out of football for a minimum of six months.

In March 2015, Velkov extended his contract with Slavia for a further three years. He returned to training in April, but he did not take part in any further matches, so he missed the entire 2014–15 season.

Velkov returned to play in the first match of the 2015–16 season against Lokomotiv Plovdiv as a substitute in the 88th minute.

Velkov scored his debut goal for Slavia in the league on 17 September 2016 in a match against Ludogorets Razgrad, lost by his team with 3–1.

=== Den Bosch ===
On 10 August 2018, Velkov signed for the Dutch Eerste Divisie team Den Bosch. He made his debut a week later, playing the full 90 minutes in a 2–1 away win over FC Volendam. He scored his first goal for the club on 25 September, in a 2–1 loss against Heracles Almelo in the KNVB Cup.

=== MSV Duisburg ===
After a short stint at KFC Uerdingen he moved to MSV Duisburg in January 2021. He signed a new one-year contract on 27 May 2021. In the summer of 2022, he left Duisburg.

=== Vejle ===
On 17 June 2022, Velkov signed with newly relegated Danish 1st Division side Vejle Boldklub, penning a deal until June 2024. On 29 May 2025, Velkov extended his contract with the club until June 2027.

=== Sønderjyske ===
On deadline-day, 2 September 2026, Velkov joined Sønderjyske on a three-year contract.

== International career ==
=== Youth levels ===
Velkov represented Bulgaria at the under-16, under-17 and under-19 levels. On 1 June 2013, he made his debut for the Bulgaria under-21 side at the age of 16 years, 5 months and 22 days, making him the second-youngest player to debut for the team after Nikolay Mihaylov. On 25 March 2016 Velkov was in the starting lineup for the goalless draw with Wales U21. He served as the team captain.

=== Senior level ===
On 14 March 2017, he received his first call-up for Bulgaria senior team for the match against the Netherlands on 25 March 2017, in which he was an unused substitute. Velkov earned his first cap on 26 February 2020, playing the first 75 minutes of the 1–0 home loss against Belarus in a friendly game.

== Career statistics ==
=== Club ===
As of 31 August 2026

Appearances and goals by club, season and competition
Club	Season	League			Cup		Europe		Other		Total	
Club	Season	Division	Apps	Goals	Apps	Goals	Apps	Goals	Apps	Goals	Apps	Goals
Slavia Sofia	2013–14	A Group	21	0	2	1	—		—		23	1
Slavia Sofia	2014–15	A Group	0	0	0	0	—		—		0	0
Slavia Sofia	2015–16	A Group	24	0	1	0	—		—		25	0
Slavia Sofia	2016–17	Bulgarian First League	19	1	1	0	2 (Note: Appearances in UEFA Europa League)	0	2 (Note: Appearances in Bulgarian First League relegation play-offs)	0	24	1
Slavia Sofia	2017–18	Bulgarian First League	22	1	2	0	—		—		24	1
Slavia Sofia	Total		86	2	6	1	2	0	2	0	96	3
Den Bosch	2018–19	Eerste Divisie	20	2	1	1	—		2 (Note: Appearances in Eredivisie promotion play-offs)	0	23	3
Den Bosch	2019–20	Eerste Divisie	21	2	1	0	—		—		22	2
Den Bosch	Total		41	4	2	1	0	0	2	0	45	5
Waalwijk (loan)	2019–20	Eredivisie	3	0	0	0	—		0	0	3	0
KFC Uerdingen	2020–21	3. Liga	5	0	—		—		—		5	0
MSV Duisburg	2020–21	3. Liga	3	0	—		—		—		3	0
MSV Duisburg	2021–22	3. Liga	16	0	—		—		—		16	0
MSV Duisburg	Total		19	0	—		—		—		19	0
Vejle	2022–23	Danish 1st Division	27	1	5	1	—		—		32	2
Vejle	2023–24	Danish Superliga	26	0	1	0	—		—		27	0
Vejle	2024–25	Danish Superliga	23	3	0	0	—		—		23	3
Vejle	2025–26	Danish Superliga	20	4	1	1	—		—		21	5
Vejle	2026–27	Danish 1st Division	6	0	1	3	—		—		7	3
Vejle	Total		102	8	8	5	—		—		110	13
Career total			256	13	16	7	2	0	4	0	278	21

=== International ===
As of match played 16 November 2026

Appearances and goals by national team and year
National team	Year	Apps	Goals
Bulgaria
Bulgaria	2020	1	0
Bulgaria	2025	1	0
Bulgaria	2026	6	0
Total		8	0

== Honours ==
Slavia Sofia

- Bulgarian Cup: 2017–18

Vejle

- Danish 1st Division: 2022–23
