= Kostadin Velkov =

Bulgarian footballer

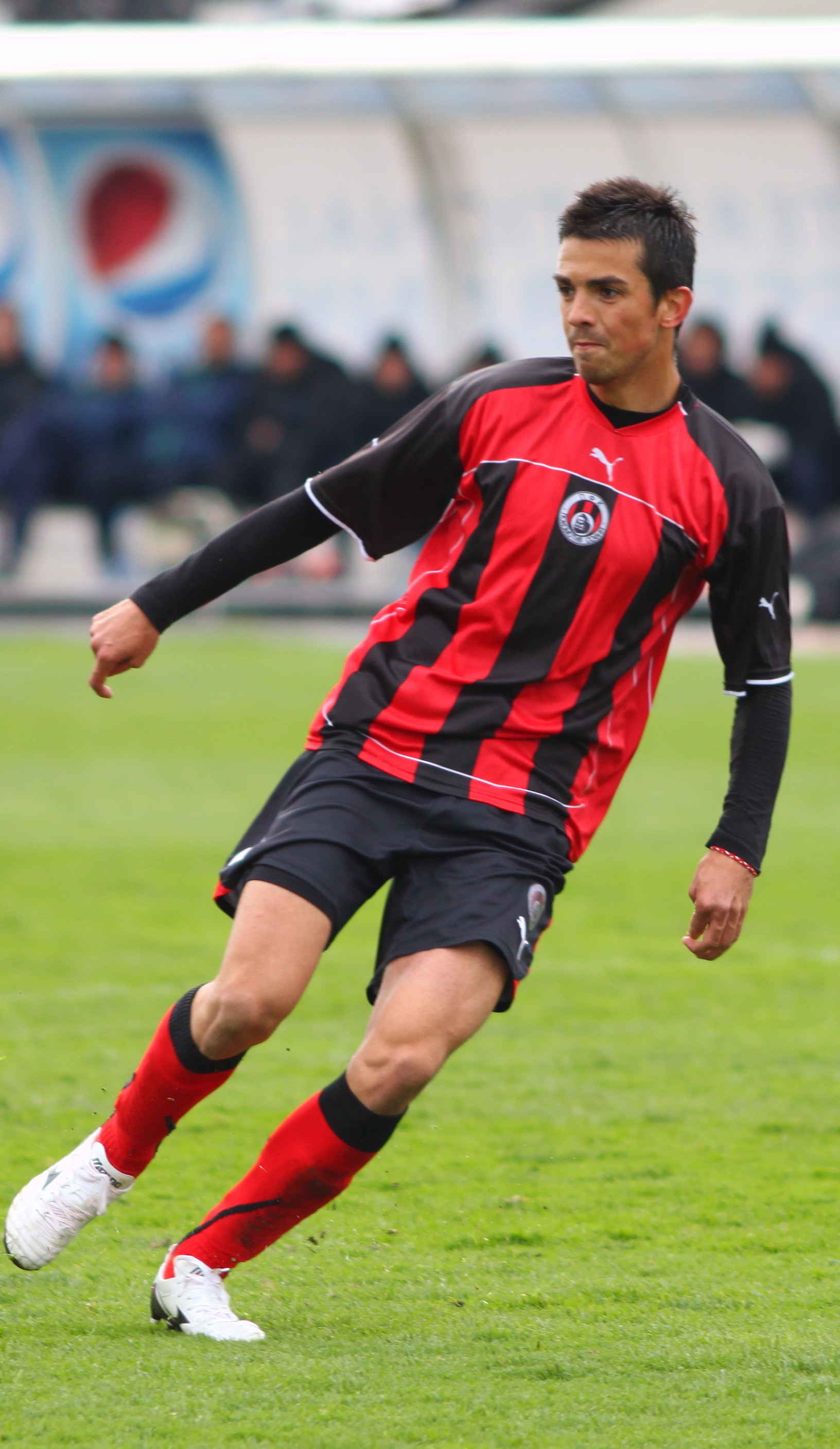
- Velkov in 2012

Personal information
- Full name: Kostadin Antonov Velkov
- Date of birth: 26 March 1989 (age 37)
- Place of birth: Sofia, Bulgaria
- Height: 1.84 m (6 ft 0 in)
- Positions: Right-back; centre back

Senior career*
Years	Team	Apps	(Gls)
2008–2009	Naftex Burgas	4	(0)
2009–2010	Chernomorets Pomorie	21	(1)
2010	Akademik Sofia	0	(0)
2011	Chernomorets Burgas	0	(0)
2011	Chernomorets Pomorie	11	(0)
2012–2013	Lokomotiv Sofia	28	(0)
2013–2014	Slavia Sofia	10	(2)
2014–2015	Würzburger Kickers	10	(0)
2015–2016	Lokomotiv Sofia	16	(5)
2016–2017	Neftochimic Burgas	14	(1)
2017–2018	Slavia Sofia	20	(0)
2018–2020	Chemnitzer FC	32	(4)
2020	Atlas Delmenhorst	4	(0)
2021–2022	Slavia Sofia	2	(0)
2022	Balkan Botevgrad	2	(0)

Managerial career
- 2024–2026: Lokomotiv Sofia (youth coach)
- 2026–: Lokomotiv Sofia (assistant)
- * Club domestic league appearances and goals

Kostadin Velkov (Bulgarian: Костадин Велков; born 26 March 1989) is a former Bulgarian professional footballer who played as a defender. His is the son of former footballer and manager Anton Velkov.

== Career ==
In June 2017, Velkov signed with Slavia Sofia.

In May 2018, he joined German Regionalliga side Chemnitzer FC.

In December 2020, Velkov returned to Slavia Sofia where he spent a year before signing with Balkan Botevgrad in January 2022.

== Honours ==
Slavia Sofia

- Bulgarian Cup: 2017–18

== Life after football ==
In 2023 Kostadin Velkov became the winner of the 9th season of the Bulgarian reality show "The Farm". In 2025 Kostadin Velkov became the co-host with Bulgarian YouTuber Hristo Trichkov of the football show 'Hater vs Footballer''.
