= Cédric Baseya =

Footballer (born 1987)

Personal information
- Date of birth: 19 December 1987 (age 38)
- Place of birth: Brétigny-sur-Orge, France
- Height: 1.95 m (6 ft 5 in)
- Position: Striker

Youth career
- 1995–2005: Brétigny
- 2005–2007: Southampton

Senior career*
Years	Team	Apps	(Gls)
2007–2008	Southampton	1	(0)
2007	→ Crewe Alexandra (loan)	3	(0)
2008–2011	Lille	1	(0)
2009–2010	→ Le Havre (loan)	19	(0)
2011	AS Cherbourg		
2011–2012	Reading	0	(0)
2011	→ Barnet (loan)	2	(0)
2013	Lokomotiv Sofia	5	(1)
2015	Monza		
2017–2018	Boulogne-Billancourt	9	(2)

International career
2007	DR Congo U20	1	(0)
- * Club domestic league appearances and goals

Cédric Baseya (born 19 December 1987) is a former professional footballer who played as a forward. Born in France, he made one appearance for the DR Congo U20 national team.

== Club career ==
Baseya was born in Brétigny-sur-Orge, Essonne. He formerly played for Southampton in the English Championship.

On 17 November 2007, he made his debut with Crewe Alexandra after signing for them on loan for one month the previous day.

He made his Southampton debut as a last-minute substitute against Ipswich Town on 1 March 2008 but did not touch the ball in the short time he was on the pitch. Baseya moved to Lille on a Bosman on 2 July 2008, and was loaned out on 10 August 2009 to Le Havre AC.

On 21 September 2011, Baseya signed a 12-month contract with Reading. On 24 November 2011, he was loaned out on a short-term deal to League Two side Barnet, making his debut on 25 November in a 2–1 home win against Macclesfield Town when he came on as a second-half substitute for Mark Marshall. At the end of the season, 2 May 2012, Baseya was released by Reading.

In November 2013 Baseya joined Bulgarian A PFG side PFC Lokomotiv Sofia on a two-year contract. Baseya scored on his Lokomotiv debut, coming on as a 57th-minute substitute and scoring in the 69th minute, in a 2–1 defeat against Chernomorets Burgas. Baseya made his first start for Lokomotiv in their next game, a 2–0 away win over Slavia Sofia in which he scored the first goal, in the second leg of the second round of the Bulgarian Cup. Baseya played for Monza in 2015. In 2017, Baseya signed for Boulogne-Billancourt.

== International career ==
Although born in France, he qualifies to play for the Democratic Republic of Congo via his parents. He was called up for their full international side but the game was cancelled and he has since represented them at Under 20 level in a 2–1 defeat by Argentina.
