= Oleg Shalayev =

Russian footballer

Personal information
- Full name: Oleg Arkadyevich Shalayev
- Date of birth: 6 February 1992 (age 34)
- Place of birth: Saint Petersburg, Russia
- Height: 1.81 m (5 ft 11 in)
- Position: Midfielder

Team information
- Current team: Dynamo Bryansk
- Number: 18

Senior career*
Years	Team	Apps	(Gls)
2008–2009	Krasnodar-2000	50	(5)
2010	Spartak Nalchik	0	(0)
2011–2013	Krylia Sovetov Samara	0	(0)
2013	→ Yenisey Krasnoyarsk (loan)	2	(0)
2013–2014	Slavia Sofia	32	(3)
2014	Haskovo	6	(0)
2016–2018	Volgar Astrakhan	59	(1)
2018–2020	Tom Tomsk	79	(3)
2021	Kuban Krasnodar	25	(1)
2022–2024	Sibir Novosibirsk	54	(4)
2024–	Dynamo Bryansk	67	(2)

International career
2010	Russia U18	5	(1)
2010–2011	Russia U19	8	(2)
2012	Russia U20	2	(0)
2012	Russia U21	1	(0)
- * Club domestic league appearances and goals as of 15 November 2026

Oleg Arkadyevich Shalayev (Russian: Олег Аркадьевич Шалаев; born 6 February 1992) is a Russian professional footballеr who plays as a midfielder for Dynamo Bryansk.

== Career ==
Shalayev made his professional debut for Spartak Nalchik on 13 July 2010 in the Russian Cup game against Volga Nizhny Novgorod.

He made his Russian Football National League debut for FC Yenisey Krasnoyarsk on 6 May 2013 in a game against FC Ufa.
