= Mitchell Burgzorg =

Footballer and rapper (born 1987)

Personal information
- Date of birth: 25 July 1987 (age 39)
- Place of birth: Zaandam, Netherlands
- Height: 1.76 m (5 ft 9 in)
- Positions: Defensive midfielder; right-back

Youth career
- 1991–1994: Hellas Sport
- 1994–2006: Ajax

Senior career*
Years	Team	Apps	(Gls)
2006–2008	Haarlem	38	(2)
2008–2010	NEC	23	(0)
2010–2012	Almere City	37	(7)
2012–2014	Ludogorets	24	(2)
2014–2015	Slavia Sofia	15	(1)
2015–2016	Almere City	19	(0)
2018–2022	Ajax Amateurs	39	(2)
Total		195	(14)
- * Club domestic league appearances and goals

Priester
- Born: Mitchell Burgzorg
- Genres: Rap, hip hop
- Occupations: Rapper, songwriter
- Years active: 2005 – present
- Labels: Black Label Music; Nindo

Mitchell Burgzorg (born 25 July 1987) is a Dutch retired footballer and a rapper under the name Priester.

== Football career ==
Burgzorg was born in Zaandam. A defensive midfielder or right-back, he who made his debut in professional football, being part of the HFC Haarlem squad in the 2006–07 season. In 2008, he moved to N.E.C. Nijmegen.

In June 2014, Burgzorg moved from Ludogorets Razgrad to fellow Bulgarian A Group side Slavia Sofia, only to return to Almere City in summer 2015.

== Honours ==
Ludogorets

- Bulgarian A Group: 2012–13, 2013–14
- Bulgarian Cup: 2013–14

== Music career ==
Burgzorg has also developed a music career as a rapper under the stage name Priester. He is signed to Black Label Music. In collaboration with Nino, he appeared on 24 uur Volume 1 and 24 uur Volume 2 released by Black Label Music.

He is a rapper who was part of the rap formation LSD (full name Lyricale Straat Dichters) based in Zaandam. He left them in 2011 for a solo career.

Known for his collaborations with other artists, he was featured in June 2010 in "Baas in mij" with Ali B and football player / rapper Soufiane Touzani, quickly followed in August the same year in "Een dagje @ spec" with Ali B, Keizer and Gio.

In February 2011, Priester prepared his own mixtape Baas Boven Baas, but it was never officially released. However, he released "Geen 1" as a single and a music video. In 2011, he appeared on Swagg On Remix, a collaboration with well-known names like Ali B, Brainpower and Excellent.

On 25 January 2012, Priester took part in the popular Dutch television series Ali B op volle toeren hosted by Moroccan-Dutch rapper Ali B. He was paired with artist Ronnie Tober to perform each other's works. Priester interpreted Tober's "Rozen voor Sandra" in a new version, whereas Tober took Priester's "Geen 1" and interpreted it as "Er is niemand zoals jij". In 2012, he signed to the Nindo music label. The manager of Nindo (Negative) has been unofficially announced that the 'Baas Boven Baas mixtape' is done, but when the mixtape comes out is not yet known.
