= Dimitar Aleksiev =

Bulgarian footballer

Personal information
- Full name: Dimitar Petrov Aleksiev
- Date of birth: 28 July 1993 (age 33)
- Place of birth: Bulgaria
- Height: 1.88 m (6 ft 2 in)
- Position: Forward

Team information
- Current team: Sayana Haskovo
- Number: 15

Youth career
- 2000–2008: Haskovo
- 2008–2011: Sliven

Senior career*
Years	Team	Apps	(Gls)
2011–2012	Lyubimets	7	(0)
2012	Haskovo	11	(7)
2013	Dimitrovgrad	11	(2)
2013–2015	Haskovo	42	(15)
2015	Botev Plovdiv	4	(0)
2016	Lokomotiv GO	11	(2)
2016	Vigor Lamezia	2	(1)
2017	Oborishte	11	(1)
2017–2019	Arda Kardzhali	30	(26)
2019	Botev Galabovo	17	(6)
2020–2021	Pirin Blagoevgrad	8	(0)
2021	Dobrudzha	13	(3)
2021	Sportist Svoge	12	(0)
2022–	Sayana Haskovo	27	(13)
- * Club domestic league appearances and goals as of 19:33, 22 February 2023 (UTC)

Dimitar Aleksiev (Bulgarian: Димитър Алексиев; born 28 July 1993) is a Bulgarian footballer who plays for Sayana Haskovo as a forward.

== Career ==
=== Early career ===
Aleksiev started his youth career at Sliven. At the beginning of his professional career he played for Lyubimets 2007 and Dimitrovgrad.

=== Haskovo ===
Aleksiev spent two years at Haskovo. He joined the team before the start of season 2013-14 and helped the team to finish on 2nd place in B Grupa and to win a promotion for A Grupa. He was selected for the best player of the season as well as best young player of the season in B Grupa.

Aleksiev played in 20 games in A Grupa and scored 5 goals for Haskovo during the 2014–15 season. Despite his efforts the team was relegated to B Grupa and Aleksiev left after the end of the season.

=== Botev Plovdiv ===
On 24 June 2015, Aleksiev joined Botev Plovdiv as a free agent and signed a two-year contract. A week later he made an unofficial debut when he came on as a substitute during the second half of the friendly game with FC Oborishte. Botev Plovdiv won with 3-1 and Aleksiev scored one of the goals.

After a long absence from the first team squad, on 30 October, Aleksiev came on as a substitute during the second half of the 2–0 away defeat of Botev Plovdiv from Slavia Sofia.

On 13 January 2016, Aleksiev was released from Botev Plovdiv after playing only 4 games for the club without scoring any goals in official games.

=== Lokomotiv GO ===
On 18 January 2016, Aleksiev signed for Lokomotiv GO, but was released six months later.

=== Oborishte ===
On 16 January 2017, Aleksiev joined Oborishte.

=== Arda Kardzhali ===
On 21 June 2017, Aleksiev joined Third League club Arda Kardzhali.
