= Marko Ranđelović =

Serbian footballer

Personal information
- Full name: Marko Ranđelović
- Date of birth: 16 August 1984 (age 42)
- Place of birth: Niš, SFR Yugoslavia
- Height: 1.84 m (6 ft 1/2 in)
- Position: Centre-back

Team information
- Current team: Sinđelić Niš

Senior career*
Years	Team	Apps	(Gls)
2002–2007	Radnički Niš	113	(7)
2007–2012	Rad	74	(4)
2012	Radnički Niš	14	(1)
2013	Taraz	0	(0)
2013–2015	Lokomotiv Sofia	50	(5)
2015–2016	Čukarički	8	(0)
2016	Neftochimic Burgas	14	(1)
2017	Bregalnica Štip	15	(0)
2018–2024	Budućnost Popovac		
2024	Planinac 1933 Prva Kutina		
2024-	Sinđelić Niš		

International career
2002	FR Yugoslavia U19	3	(0)
- * Club domestic league appearances and goals as of 26 January 2017

Marko Ranđelović (Serbian Cyrillic: Марко Ранђеловић; born 16 August 1984) is a Serbian professional footballer who plays as a defender for Sinđelić Niš.

During his career, Ranđelović played for Radnički Niš and Rad in his country, as well as for Kazakhstani club Taraz, Bulgarian clubs Lokomotiv Sofia and Neftochimic Burgas and Macedonian club Bregalnica Štip.
