= Pavle Popara =

Serbian footballer

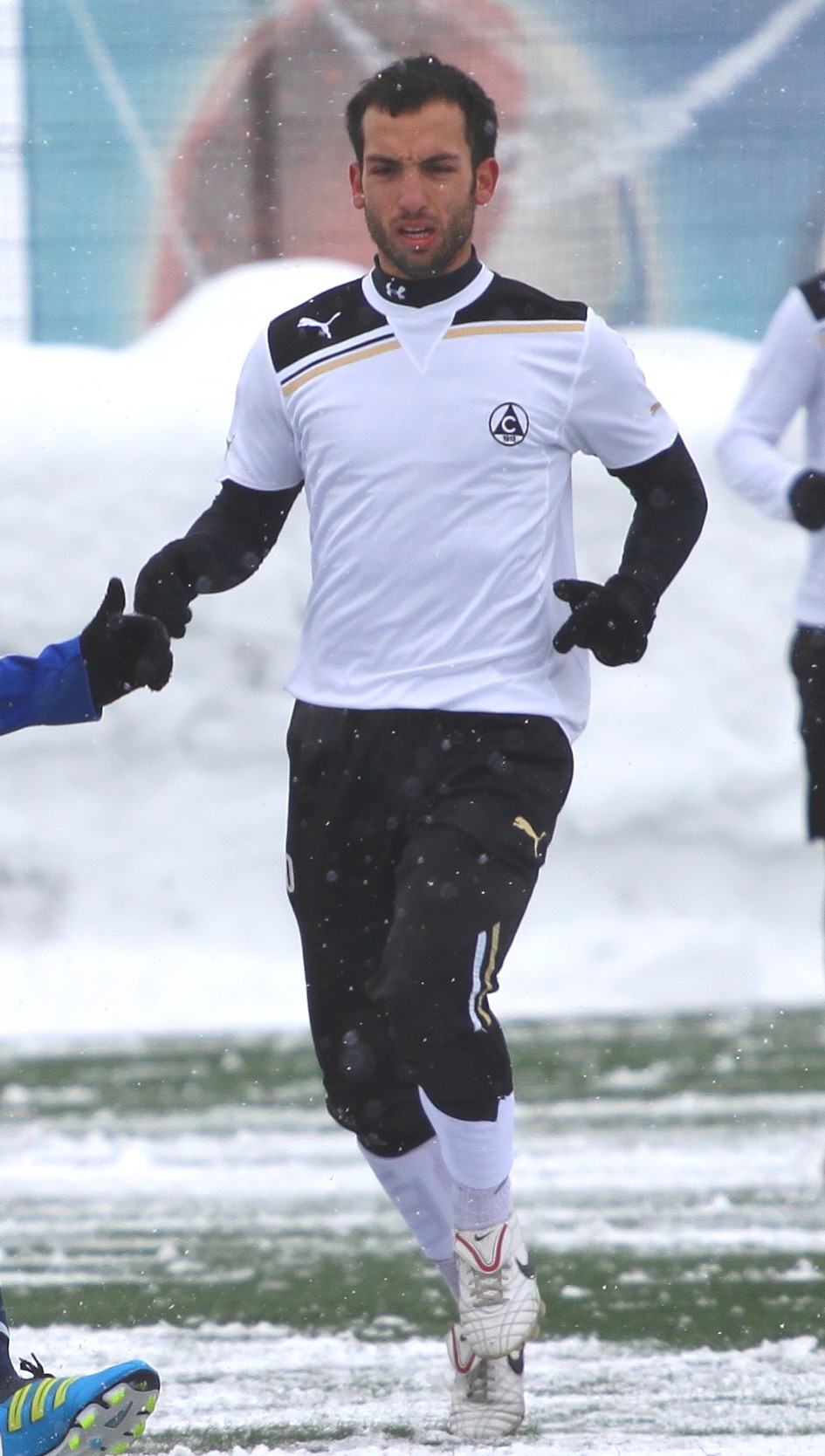

Personal information
- Full name: Pavle Popara
- Date of birth: 20 May 1987 (age 39)
- Place of birth: Kragujevac, SFR Yugoslavia
- Height: 1.77 m (5 ft 10 in)
- Position: Midfielder

Youth career
- Partizan

Senior career*
Years	Team	Apps	(Gls)
2004–2005	Partizan	0	(0)
2006–2007	Apollon Kalamarias	9	(0)
2007	→ Panetolikos (loan)	10	(3)
2007–2008	EN Paralimni	17	(1)
2008–2013	Slavia Sofia	98	(8)
2010	→ Astra Ploieşti (loan)	6	(1)
2014	Pogoń Szczecin	11	(0)
2014–2015	Radnički Niš	15	(3)
2015–2016	Orange County Blues	23	(5)
2016–2017	Radnički Niš	16	(0)
2017–2018	Zemun	8	(0)
Total		213	(21)
- * Club domestic league appearances and goals

Pavle Popara (Serbian Cyrillic: Павлe Попара; born 20 May 1987) is a Serbian retired footballer who played as a midfielder.

== Career ==
Popara started his career with Partizan Belgrade but could not break his way into the first team. He failed to make a single appearance in the Serbian SuperLiga.

In January 2006, Popara was signed by Greek side Apollon Kalamarias. He made his debut in the Super League Greece on 12 March 2006, in a 2–1 away loss against Olympiacos, coming on as a substitute for Aílton. Popara made a further two league appearances in 2005–06 season. He managed just six more league appearances during the following season before joining Panetolikos on loan in January 2007.

In the summer of 2007, Popara moved to Cyprus to play for Enosis Neon Paralimni but failed to establish himself in the team.

In June 2008, Popara joined Bulgarian A Professional Football Group side Slavia Sofia.
