= Tsvetan Krastev =

Bulgarian footballer and referee

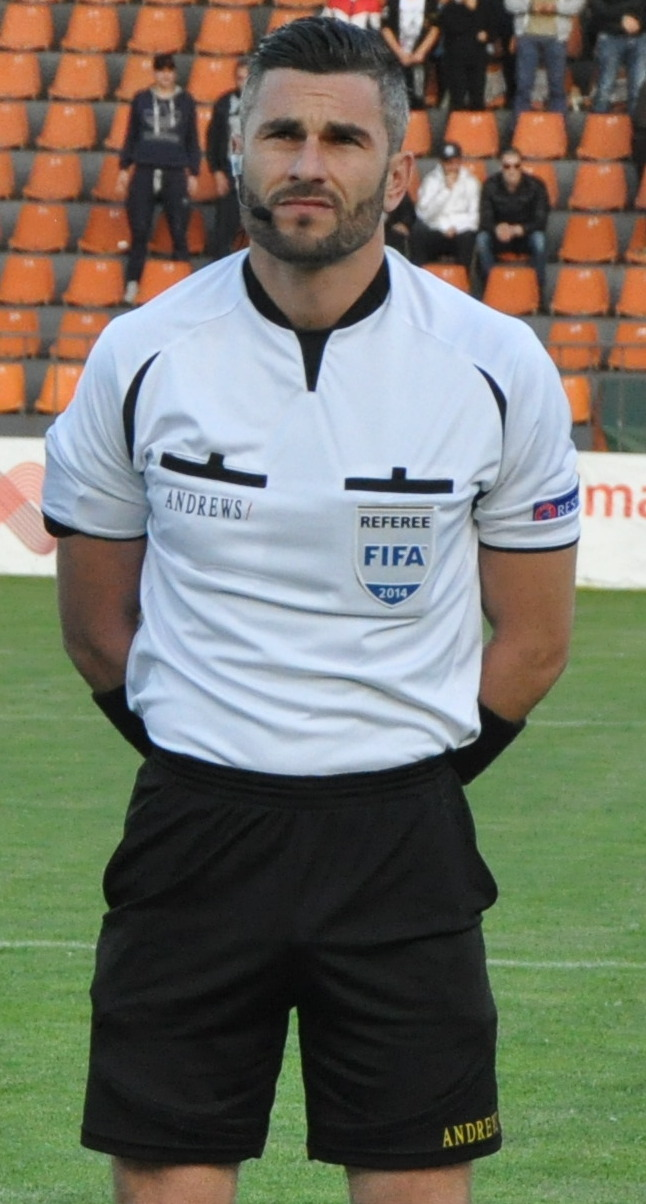
- Krastev in 2014

Personal information
- Date of birth: 3 December 1978 (age 47)
- Place of birth: Varna, Bulgaria
- Position: Defender

Youth career
- Sokol Plovdiv

Senior career*
Years	Team	Apps	(Gls)
2000–2003	Litex Lovech	7	(0)
2002	→ Spartak Varna (loan)	1	(0)
2004	Botev Plovdiv	12	(0)
2004–2005	Rodopa Smolyan	8	(0)
Refereeing career
Domestic
Years	League	Role
2010–2013	B Group	Referee
2011–2016	A Group	Referee
International
Years	League	Role
2014–2016	FIFA listed	Referee
- * Club domestic league appearances and goals

Tsvetan Krastev (Bulgarian: Цветан Кръстев; born 3 December 1978) is a Bulgarian retired football defender and referee in Bulgarian A Group, B Group and Bulgarian Cup.

== Football career ==
Krastev is youth player of Sokol Plovdiv. He has played for Litex Lovech, Spartak Varna, Botev Plovdiv and Rodopa Smolyan

== Referee career ==
Since season 2010 he is a football referee in B Group. In 2011, he made his debut in A Group as Referee. He referred 2013 Bulgarian Cup Final. He retired on 18 April 2016 due to an injury.

== Career statistics ==
Appearances and goals by club, season and competition
Club	Season	League			Bulgarian Cup		Europe		Total	
Club	Season	Division	Apps	Goals	Apps	Goals	Apps	Goals	Apps	Goals
Litex Lovech	2000–01	Bulgarian Premier Professional League	2	0	0	0	–		2	0
Litex Lovech	2001–02	Bulgarian Premier Professional League	0	0	0	0	1	0	1	0
Litex Lovech	2002–03	Bulgarian Premier Professional League	5	0	0	0	1	0	6	0
Spartak Varna (loan)	2001–02	Bulgarian Premier Professional League	1	0	0	0	–		1	0
Botev Plovdiv	2003–04	A Group	12	0	0	0	–		12	0
Rodopa Smolyan	2004–05	A Group	8	0	0	0	–		8	0
Career total			28	0	0	0	2	0	30	0
