= Tom (footballer, born 1986) =

Brazilian footballer

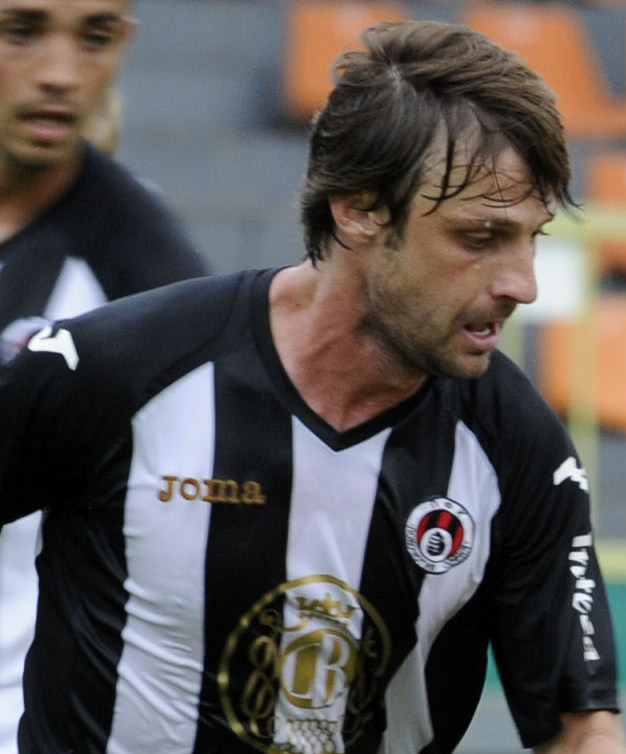

Personal information
- Full name: Everton Fernando Gilio
- Date of birth: 18 March 1986 (age 40)
- Place of birth: Nova Esperança, Paraná, Brazil
- Height: 1.81 m (5 ft 11 in)
- Position: Central midfielder

Team information
- Current team: CSKA 1948 Sofia (scout)

Youth career
- 1998–2000: Botafogo de Ribeirão Preto
- 2000–2002: São Paulo
- 2002–2006: Palmeiras

Senior career*
Years	Team	Apps	(Gls)
2007	Palmeiras B	30	(4)
2007	Taquaritinga	16	(5)
2008–2011	Lokomotiv Plovdiv	67	(5)
2011–2012	Minyor Pernik	63	(4)
2013–2015	Lokomotiv Sofia	77	(5)
2015–2017	Beroe	28	(1)
2017–2018	Lokomotiv Sofia	24	(2)
2019	Batatais	12	(0)
2019–2020	Lokomotiv Sofia	21	(0)
2021	Spartak Pleven		
2023	CSKA 1948 II	0	(0)

Managerial career
- 2021–: CSKA 1948 Sofia (scout)
- * Club domestic league appearances and goals

Everton Fernando Gilio (born 18 March 1986), commonly known as Tom, is a retired Brazilian footballer who played as a midfielder, and current scout of Bulgarian club FC CSKA 1948 Sofia.

== Career ==
Tom was raised in Atlético Paranaense and Palmeiras's youths teams. In the first half of 2007 he played for Palmeiras B, appearing in 6 games with one goal in the Campeonato Paulista Série A2. Then he signed for Taquaritinga.

Having had an unsuccessful trial with CSKA Sofia in January 2008, Tom joined Lokomotiv Plovdiv. On 22 February 2008, he signed a 3-year contract with Lokomotiv.

=== Lokomotiv Sofia ===
On 18 January 2013, Tom signed with Lokomotiv Sofia on a one-and-a-half-year deal. He made his competitive debut for the club in a league game against Lokomotiv Plovdiv on 2 March, playing the full 90 minutes. On 13 April 2013, Tom was sent off after receiving two yellow cards in Lokomotiv's 2–1 loss against Levski Sofia at Georgi Asparuhov Stadium.

On 25 July 2014, Tom signed a one-year contract extension, keeping him at Lokomotiv until 30 June 2015. He had a second stint with the "railwaymen" between the summer of 2019 and April 2020, becoming team captain.

=== Later career ===
In January 2021, Tom signed with OFC Spartak Pleven.

In November 2021, Tom joined FC CSKA 1948 Sofia as the clubs new scout. On 30 May 2023 he returned on bench for CSKA 1948 II.
