= Atanas Kurdov =

Bulgarian footballer (born 1988)

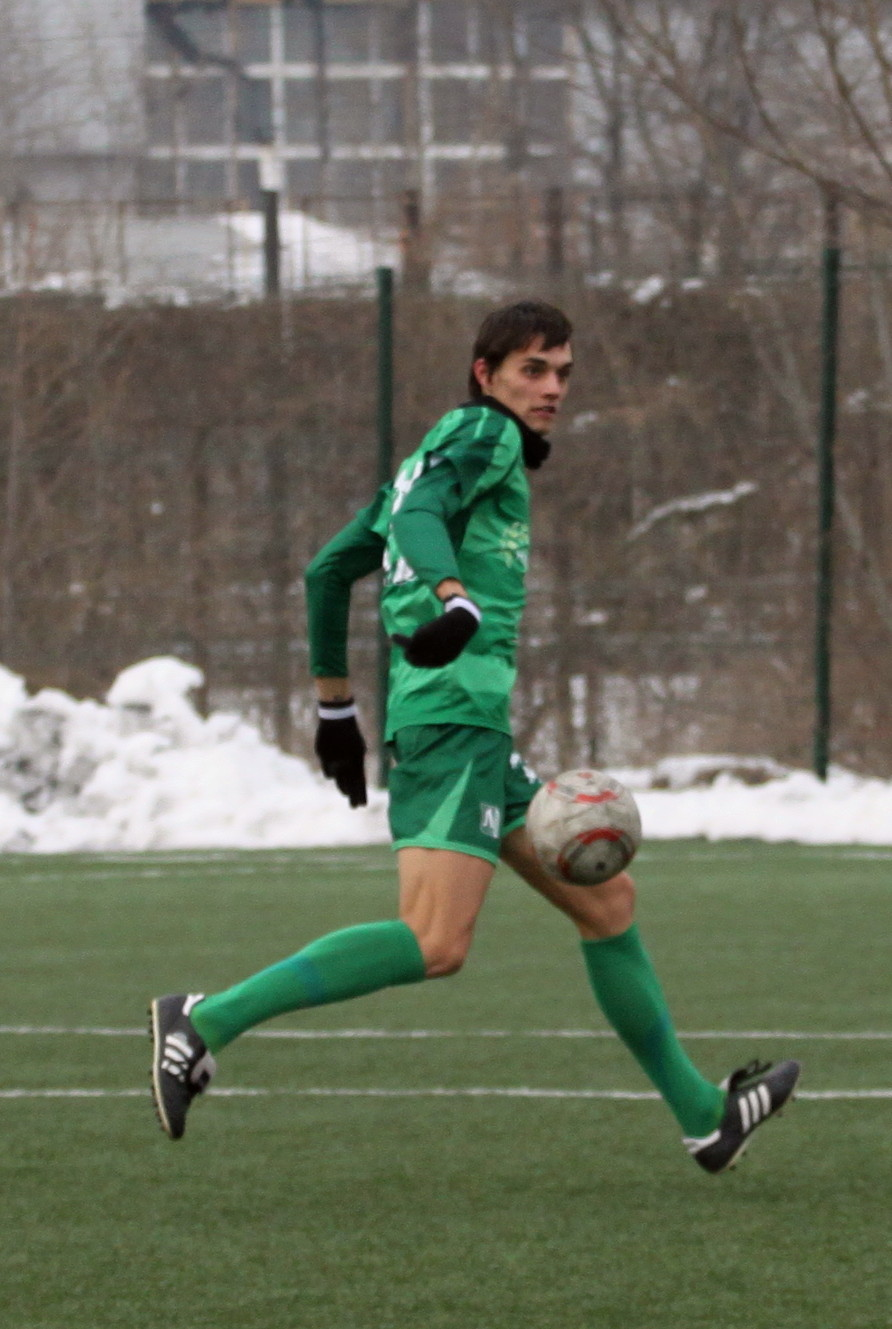

Personal information
- Full name: Atanas Petrov Kurdov
- Date of birth: 28 September 1988 (age 38)
- Place of birth: Plovdiv, Bulgaria
- Height: 1.91 m (6 ft 3 in)
- Position: Striker

Team information
- Current team: Botev Ihtiman
- Number: 11

Youth career
- Levski Sofia

Senior career*
Years	Team	Apps	(Gls)
2007–2010	Bayer Leverkusen II	46	(14)
2009	→ Winterthur (loan)	3	(0)
2010–2012	Botev Plovdiv	46	(50)
2012	Lokomotiv Plovdiv	10	(0)
2013–2014	Slavia Sofia	22	(11)
2014–2015	Astana	25	(6)
2015	Levski Sofia	8	(0)
2016	Velbazhd Kyustendil	?	(?)
2017	Litex Lovech	4	(2)
2017	Lokomotiv Sofia	1	(0)
2019	Slivnishki Geroy	?	(?)
2020–	Botev Ihtiman	1	(1)

International career
2007–2009	Bulgaria U21		
- * Club domestic league appearances and goals as of 5 April 2017

Atanas Petrov Kurdov (Bulgarian: Атанас Петров Курдов; born 28 September 1988) is a Bulgarian footballer who plays as a striker for Botev Ihtiman. His father is former player and manager Petar Kurdov.

== Career ==
=== Youth career ===
Kurdov is a product of the Levski Sofia's Youth Academy. In 2007, he spent weeks on a trial period in Celtic FC and Tottenham Hotspur. All in all, Kurdov signed for Bayer 04 Leverkusen.

=== Bayer 04 Leverkusen ===
On 9 July 2007, Kurdov signed a four-year contract with Bayer 04 Leverkusen. In his first season there, Atanas capped 26 times and scored 10 goals for the reserves team. In the summer of 2010 he was released from the club.

=== Botev Plovdiv ===
After being released from Bayer 04 Leverkusen he signed with Bulgarian V AFG side Botev Plovdiv on 24 August, despite being wanted by his youth club Levski Sofia earlier that summer. He was top scorer in the third tier in 2010–11, with 46 goals in the South East V FG. He also scored 3 goals in 3 minutes against Stambolovo. In January 2011, Kurdov was approached by newly promoted A PFG club Ludogorets Razgrad, but his transfer fell through, due to the accusations of being a glory seeker from the Botev fans. On June 26, 2012, he was released from Botev Plovdiv along with 15 other players.

=== Lokomotiv Plovdiv ===
After a one-week trial, on 25 August 2012, Kurdov joined Botev's eternal rivals Lokomotiv Plovdiv on a year contract. His move to Lokomotiv remains very controversial keeping in mind his family's history with Botev (his father and older brother Evgeni also played for Botev).

=== FC Astana ===
On 26 February 2014, Kurdov signed for Kazakhstan Premier League side Astana. On 19 April, he scored three goals in the 4:3 away win over Irtysh Pavlodar in a Kazakhstan Premier League match.

=== Levski Sofia ===
He returned to his youth club Levski Sofia in the summer 2015, but had difficulty establishing himself as a regular player under manager Stoycho Stoev and parted ways with the "bluemen" in November.

=== Lokomotiv Sofia ===
On 29 June 2017, Kurdov signed a 1-year contract with Lokomotiv Sofia. On 3 August 2017, Kurdov released his contract with club.

=== Slivnishki Geroy ===
In February 2019, Kurdov joined FC Slivnishki Geroy Slivnitsa.

== Honours ==
Astana

- Kazakhstan Premier League (1): 2014
