= Sota (footballer) =

Spanish footballer

Personal information
- Full name: Sergio Campano Franco
- Date of birth: 1 June 1987 (age 39)
- Place of birth: Badajoz, Spain
- Height: 1.69 m (5 ft 6 1/2 in)
- Position: Midfielder

Team information
- Current team: SD Tenisca
- Number: 11

Senior career*
Years	Team	Apps	(Gls)
2006–2009	CD Badajoz	54	(26)
2009–2010	Mérida UD	28	(8)
2010–2011	Sporting Villanueva	17	(6)
2011–2012	CP Sanvicenteño	31	(12)
2012	FC Milsami	1	(0)
2012–2013	Jerez CF	29	(9)
2013	Thunder Bay Chill	18	(8)
2013	Lokomotiv Sofia	10	(1)
2014–2015	UP Plasencia	?	(1)
2014–2015	SD Tenisca	?	(6)
2015	Thunder Bay Chill	7	(?)
2018	Thunder Bay Chill	10	(6)
- * Club domestic league appearances and goals as of 22 September 2013

Sergio Campano Franco (born 1 June 1987 in Badajoz), aka Sota, is a Spanish footballer who plays as a midfielder (winger or playmaker).

== Career ==
Players formed in the ranks of Don Bosco, was signed by the historic CD Badajoz in his city. He devoted fan favorite as only 19 years and were several first division clubs who followed in his footsteps, to its equipment subsidiary, without any concrete reached.

After a short time in Los Barrios, signed by another historic region, where Mérida UD had a great season scoring 8 goals. Stop by the Sporting Villanueva winning promotion to the 2nd B. After a successful year in which he scored 12 goals Sanvicenteño, signed by Major League Milsami Moldovan, inclusive was convocate for Europa League.

The experience is short for changes in the sports direction, a week after signing. This returns to his hometown, playing in the Jerez CF, which makes another year, scoring 9 goals and being one of the best players of the season.

In May 2013 signed by the Thunder Bay Chill (Canada) and plays in the Premier Development League USA, gets to play the final of USA. He's awarded Rookie of Year 2013. Scored 8 goals and becomes one of the best assistants in the championship.

After his American success he called the attention of several European clubs, finally signing with Lokomotiv Sofia, a club from Bulgaria that acquired his services. His debut in the competition was on 21 September, against Cherno More, entering in the 47th minute. He scored his first goal in a Bulgarian competition in a Cup match, against Slavia Sofia on 6 November 2013.
