= Chris Gadi =

French footballer (born 1992)

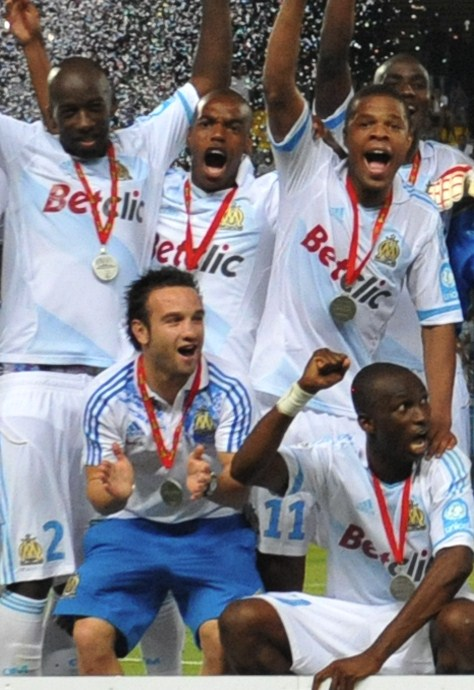
- Trophee des Champions 2011

Personal information
- Full name: Chris Gadi N'Kiasala
- Date of birth: 9 April 1992 (age 34)
- Place of birth: Ris Orangis, France
- Height: 1.77 m (5 ft 10 in)
- Position: Winger

Youth career
- 2000–2004: Grigny
- 2004–2006: Linas-Montlhéry
- 2006–2007: Viry-Châtillon
- 2007–2009: Marseille

Senior career*
Years	Team	Apps	(Gls)
2009–2011	Marseille B		
2011–2013	Marseille	5	(0)
2012–2013	→ Boulogne (loan)	21	(6)
2013–2014	Lokomotiv Plovdiv	29	(7)
2014–2015	Beroe Stara Zagora	19	(2)
2015–2016	Atlético CP	1	(0)
2016–2017	Spartak Pleven	23	(12)
2017–2019	Septemvri Sofia	52	(13)
2019	Petrojet SC	10	(1)
2019–2020	Etar	6	(0)
2020	Al-Mujazzal	8	(1)
2020–2021	Olympic Charleroi	3	(2)
2021	Montana	6	(0)
2021–2022	Egnatia	7	(0)
2022	Tilikratis		

International career
2008–2009	France U17	12	(2)
2009	France U18	4	(0)
- * Club domestic league appearances and goals as of 20 December 2019

Chris Gadi N'Kiasala (born 9 April 1992) is a French professional footballer. He plays as a winger, is equally comfortable playing on both right and the left winger positions.

== Career ==
=== Early career ===
Gadi first started playing for his local side Grigny, before playing for Linas-Montlhéry and Viry-Châtillon at age 13 and 14 respectively. Marseille signed Gadi to train with them at age 15, despite interest from other Ligue 1 clubs. However, Marseille was the club that Gadi's father supported, thus the decision. He signed his first professional contract in 2011, and he made his professional debut on 17 December 2011 in a 2–1 win over Lorient, coming on for Jordan Ayew. He was loaned to Boulogne in 2012 under the auspices of various coaches at Marseille. Upon return, he stated he wished to progress his career with Marseille. However, he was released following the Boulogne loan.

Despite interest from Doncaster Rovers in the Championship, Gadi and the Doncaster representatives failed to reach an agreement, so he signed with Lokomotiv Plovdiv in Bulgaria.

=== Septemvri Sofia ===
On 18 June 2017, Gadi signed with the newly promoted to Bulgarian First League team of Septemvri Sofia, coming from Spartak Pleven. He made his debut for the team in the second round of the league during a win against Pirin Blagoevgrad.

=== Olympic Charleroi ===
In August 2020 he joined Belgian First Amateur Division club Olympic Charleroi.

== Career statistics ==
=== Club ===
As of 20 April 2019

Club	Season	Division	League		Cup		Europe		Other		Total	
Club	Season	Division	Apps	Goals	Apps	Goals	Apps	Goals	Apps	Goals	Apps	Goals
Marseille	2011–12	Ligue 1	3	0	1	0	0	0	1	0	5	0
Marseille	2012–13	Ligue 1	0	0	0	0	0	0	–		0	0
Boulogne (loan)	2012–13	National	19	6	2	0	–		–		21	6
Lokomotiv Plovdiv	2013–14	A Group	22	4	7	3	–		–		29	7
Beroe Stara Zagora	2014–15	A Group	16	2	3	0	–		–		19	2
Atlético CP	2015–16	LigaPro	0	0	0	0	–		–		0	0
Spartak Pleven	2016–17	Second League	22	11	1	1	–		–		23	12
Septemvri Sofia	2017–18	First League	31	7	2	1	–		–		33	8
Septemvri Sofia	2018–19	First League	18	5	1	0	–		–		19	5
Petrojet	2018–19	Egyptian Premier League	7	1	0	0	–		–		7	1
Career statistics			138	36	17	5	0	0	1	0	156	41

== International career ==
Gadi is a France youth international having represented his nation at under-17 and under-18 level. He played with the under-17 team at the 2009 UEFA European Under-17 Football Championship. His father is a fan of Marseille and, subsequently, named his son after former Marseille player and England international Chris Waddle.

== Honours ==
Marseille

- Trophée des Champions: 2011
