= Stadion Hristo Bonev =

Multi-purpose stadium in Plovdiv, Bulgaria

- Лаута (Lauta)
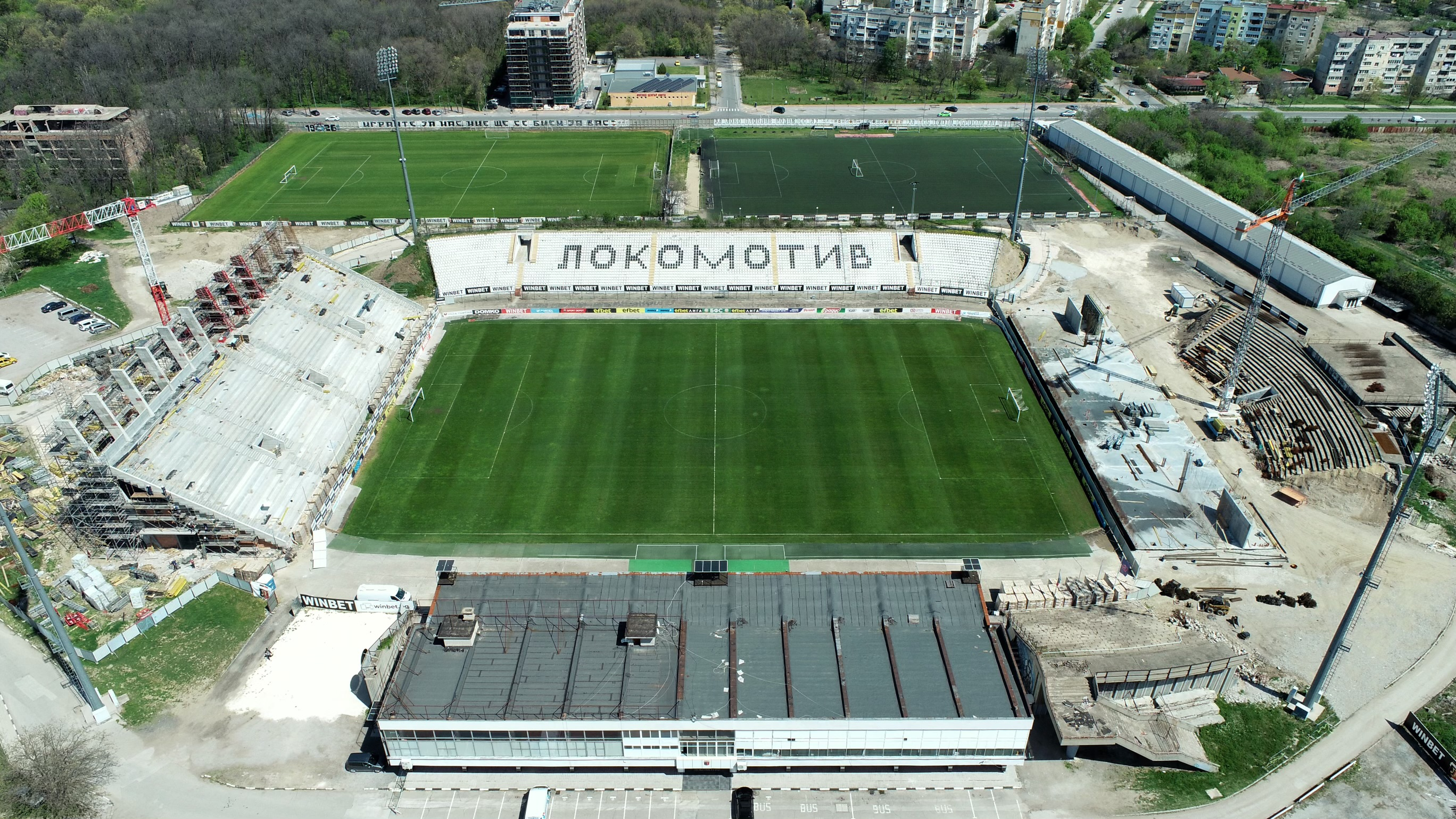
- Interactive map of Stadion Hristo Bonev
- Full name: Hristo Bonev Stadium
- Location: Plovdiv, Bulgaria
- Coordinates: 42°8′2″N 24°46′18″E
- Owner: Municipality of Plovdiv
- Operator: PFC Lokomotiv Plovdiv
- Capacity: 14,000 (planned)
- Surface: Grass
- Field size: 105.3 m × 71.4 m

Construction
- Groundbreaking: 1980
- Built: 1980–1982
- Opened: 6 September 1982
- Renovated: 2010, 2013, 2016, 2019, 2021
- Architect: Zdravko Vasilkov

Tenant
- PFC Lokomotiv Plovdiv (1982–present)

Stadion Hristo Bonev (Bulgarian: Стадион „Христо Бонев“, English: Hristo Bonev Stadium), formerly known as Stadion Lokomotiv (Bulgarian: Стадион „Локомотив“, English: 'Lokomotiv Stadium'), nicknamed Lauta (Bulgarian: Лаута) after the park in which it is situated, is a multi-purpose stadium located in southeastern Plovdiv, Bulgaria. It is the club stadium of Lokomotiv Plovdiv. The stadium was officially opened on 6 September 1982 and is a part of a sports complex, which includes an indoor athletic hall, a volleyball hall, five tennis courts and three training pitches. The stadium initially held a capacity of 24,000 people.

== Recent redevelopments ==
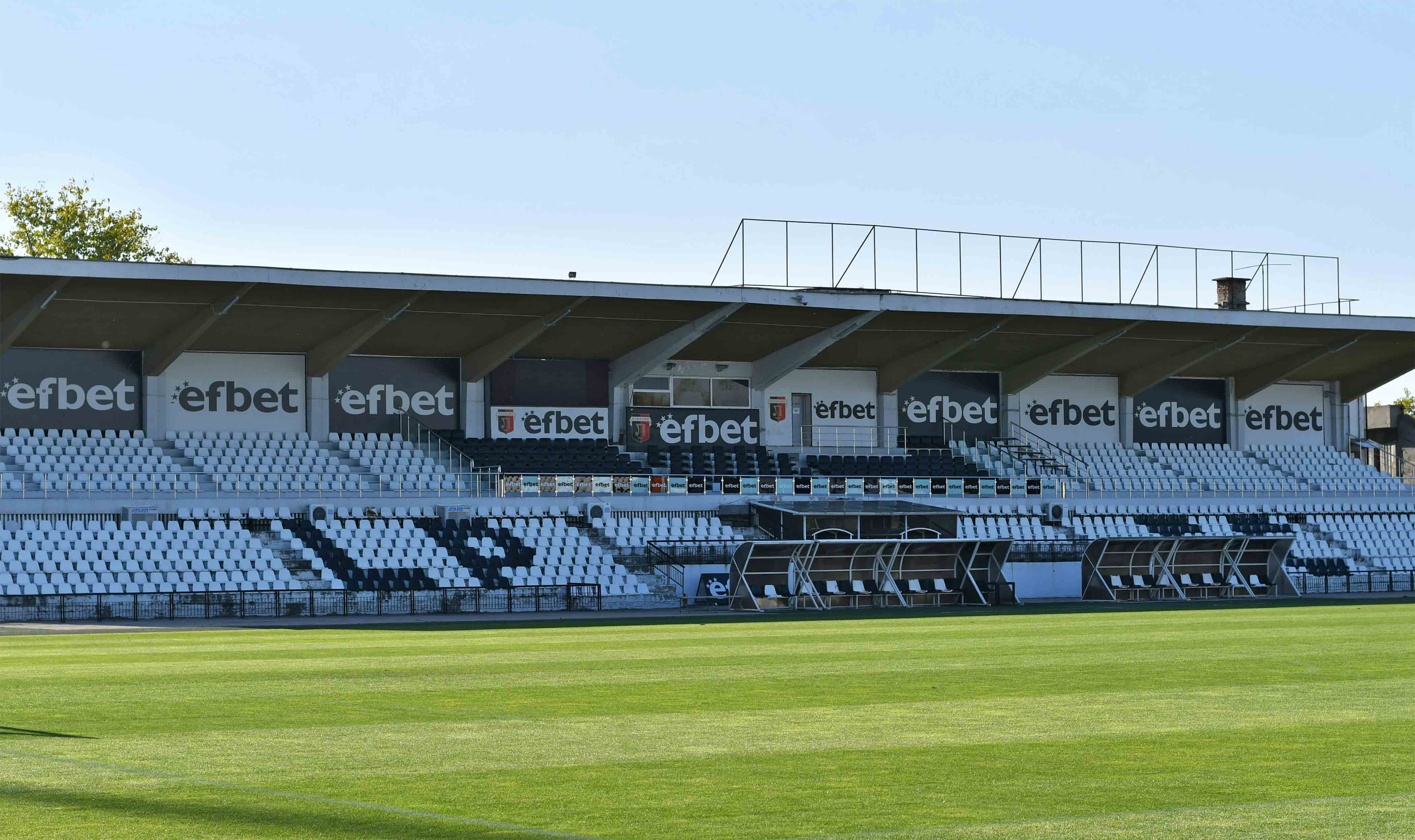
The Main stand of the stadium

In 2013, electric floodlights were introduced to the stadium.

In 2019, the stadium was renovated again in order to comply with UEFA Category 3 and be able to host European competitions games up to the play off round. Bessica stand received 660 brand new plastic seats and the West Stand called Sportclub got 1460 extra seats added to its corner sector. Also the stadium conference hall got renovated and made bigger to be able to accommodate more journalists and personnel. Some areas around the stadium got cleaned up and turned into car parking's in order to comply with the UEFA requirements for available parking spots. After the renovation the stadium capacity become 9,220 people for European competition games and the total stadium capacity 13,220 people. Shortly after the renovation works were complete, Lokomotiv Plovdiv played their first European game on this stadium in their history against the Slovak team Spartak Trnava. The game on 25/07/19 was won by Lokomotiv Plovdiv with 2:0 in front of nearly 10,000 spectators. This date also matched with Lokomotiv's 93rd birthday and the win was a great gift for the thousands of people attending the game.

In 2021 after a government funding for the Plovdiv city football infrastructure the works on the new Bessica stand started with the completion date set for the summer of 2022. Also by the end of the same year the opposite south stand were demolished and preparation started for the foundations of the stand. Both the North and south stands are planned to host 2,846 spectators each and being completed by the end of 2022. After the Bessica and south stand are completed, the west stand called Sportclub is expected to be the next one to be demolished and build back up from the scratch. The total capacity for the stadium is planned to be 14,500 after the construction works are completed by the summer of 2024.

In December 2023, the Supreme Administrative Court of Bulgaria cancelled the construction contract of the new Central Stand.

In September 2026, the stadium was renamed after Hristo Bonev, a former player and club legend of FC Lokomotiv Plovdiv, following a vote by the Plovdiv Municipal Council.

== Records ==
The record attendance for this stadium was in 1983 when Lokomotiv played against Chernomorets Burgas in a playoff game for entering the country's top tier league. There were 33,000 people attending this game and at least 6,000 of those were actually outside of the stadium.

== Location ==
Lokomotiv stadium is located in Trakia district, on the south-eastern periphery of the large urban center of Plovdiv. Near the stadium is Lauta Park, one of the largest green areas in Plovdiv.

=== Transport ===
==== Public transport ====
Plovdiv Bus routes near by:

Station Num	Name	Route
234	Lokomotiv Stadium	18, 24, 29, 44, 9
219	Tchaika Pharma	18, 24, 29, 44, 9
1011	Trakia RC(А-12)	21, 25, 29, 66

==== Automobile ====
The stadium has onsite parking for 100 cars. The main road access to the stadium is via Lev Tolstoy str.

==== Bicycle ====
The cycling infrastructure of Plovdiv offers easy access to Lokomotiv stadium. Bike lanes near by:

- Sankt Peterburg blvd. (North)
- Mendeleev blvd. (West)
- Osvobozhdenie blvd. (South)
- Dimitar Rizov str. (East) (under construction)
