= Ivan Valchanov =

Bulgarian footballer

Personal information
- Full name: Ivan Nikolaev Valchanov
- Date of birth: 28 September 1991 (age 35)
- Place of birth: Sandanski, Bulgaria
- Height: 1.70 m (5 ft 7 in)
- Position: Midfielder

Youth career
- Vihren Sandanski

Senior career*
Years	Team	Apps	(Gls)
2009–2013	Chavdar Etropole	34	(5)
2012	→ Montana (loan)	7	(0)
2012–2013	→ Novara (loan)	0	(0)
2013–2014	Lyubimets 2007	23	(5)
2014–2015	Slavia Sofia	33	(3)
2016	Cherno More	4	(0)
2016–2017	Neftochimic	32	(6)
2017	Septemvri Sofia	2	(0)
2017–2018	Etar	16	(0)
2018–2019	Vitosha Bistritsa	14	(2)
2019–2020	Pirin Blagoevgrad	17	(4)
2020	Lokomotiv GO	7	(0)
2020–2022	Minyor Pernik	35	(2)
2022	Belasitsa Petrich	19	(1)
2022–2023	Rilski Sportist	27	(3)
2023–2024	Kostinbrod	7	(0)

International career
2010–2012	Bulgaria U21	4	(0)
- * Club domestic league appearances and goals as of 23 August 2022

Ivan Nikolaev Valchanov (Bulgarian: Иван Николаев Вълчанов; born 28 September 1991) is a Bulgarian footballer who plays as a midfielder.

== Career ==
On 28 August 2012, Italian side Novara signed Valchanov on a season-long loan deal, with an option of making the move permanent.

On 28 January 2016, Valchanov signed with Cherno More.

=== Septemvri Sofia ===
On 17 June 2017 Valchanov signed with the newly returned to First League team of Septemvri Sofia. He made his debut for the team on 17 July 2017 in match against Dunav Ruse. On 7 August 2017, his contract was terminated by mutual consent.

=== Etar ===
On 8 August 2017, Valchanov signed with Etar Veliko Tarnovo.

== Career statistics ==
As of 25 September 2020

Club	Season	Division	League		Cup		Europe		Other		Total	
Club	Season	Division	Apps	Goals	Apps	Goals	Apps	Goals	Apps	Goals	Apps	Goals
Chavdar Etropole	2009–10	B Group	11	0	4	0	–		–		15	0
Chavdar Etropole	2010–11	B Group	23	4	2	1	–		–		25	5
Montana (loan)	2011–12	A Group	7	0	0	0	–		–		7	0
Novara (loan)	2012–13	Serie B	0	0	0	0	–		–		0	0
Lyubimets 2007	2013–14	A Group	23	5	1	0	–		–		24	5
Slavia Sofia	2014–15	A Group	23	0	2	1	–		–		25	1
Slavia Sofia	2015–16	A Group	10	2	1	0	–		–		11	2
Cherno More	2015–16	A Group	4	0	–		–		–		4	0
Neftochimic	2016–17	First League	29	6	2	0	–		5	0	36	6
Septemvri Sofia	2017–18	First League	2	0	0	0	–		–		2	0
Etar	2017–18	First League	15	0	1	0	–		–		16	0
Etar	2018–19	First League	1	0	0	0	–		–		1	0
Vitosha Bistritsa	2018–19	First League	14	2	2	0	–		2	0	18	2
Pirin Blagoevgrad	2019–20	Second League	17	3	0	0	–		–		17	3
Lokomotiv GO	2020–21	Second League	7	0	0	0	–		–		7	0
Career totals			186	22	15	2	0	0	7	0	208	24
