= Stadion Lokomotiv (Sofia) =

Football stadion in Sofia, Bulgaria

- Interactive map of Stadion Lokomotiv
- Location: Sofia, Bulgaria
- Coordinates: 42°44′15.50″N 23°18′53.30″E
- Owner: Ministry of Physical Education and Sport
- Operator: Lokomotiv Sofia
- Capacity: 16,000 (11,200 seating)
- Surface: Grass
- Field size: 105 X 68

Construction
- Groundbreaking: 1984
- Built: 1984 - 1985
- Opened: 1985
- Renovated: 2000, 2013, 2021

Tenant
- Lokomotiv 1929 Sofia (1971–present)

Stadion Lokomotiv (Bulgarian: Стадион „Локомотив“, English: 'Lokomotiv Stadium') is a multi-purpose stadium, located in Sofia, Bulgaria. The stadium holds 16,000 people, of which 11,200 are seating. The stadium was built in 1985.

It is currently used mostly for football matches and is the home ground of Lokomotiv Sofia.

Also, from 2000, the stadium is used for major rock concerts.

== Concerts ==
1. Black Sabbath, 2005
2. Depeche Mode, 2006
3. Eros Ramazzotti, 2006
4. George Michael, 28 May 2007, 25 LIVE tour
5. Iron Maiden, 4 June 2007
6. Kylie Minogue, 18 May 2008
7. Elton John, 13 June 2010 35,000
8. Depeche Mode, 12 May 2013
9. Aerosmith, 17 May 2014

P!nk was scheduled to perform at the stadium during her I'm Not Dead Tour on July 1, 2007, but she cancelled the show due to illness.

== Gallery ==
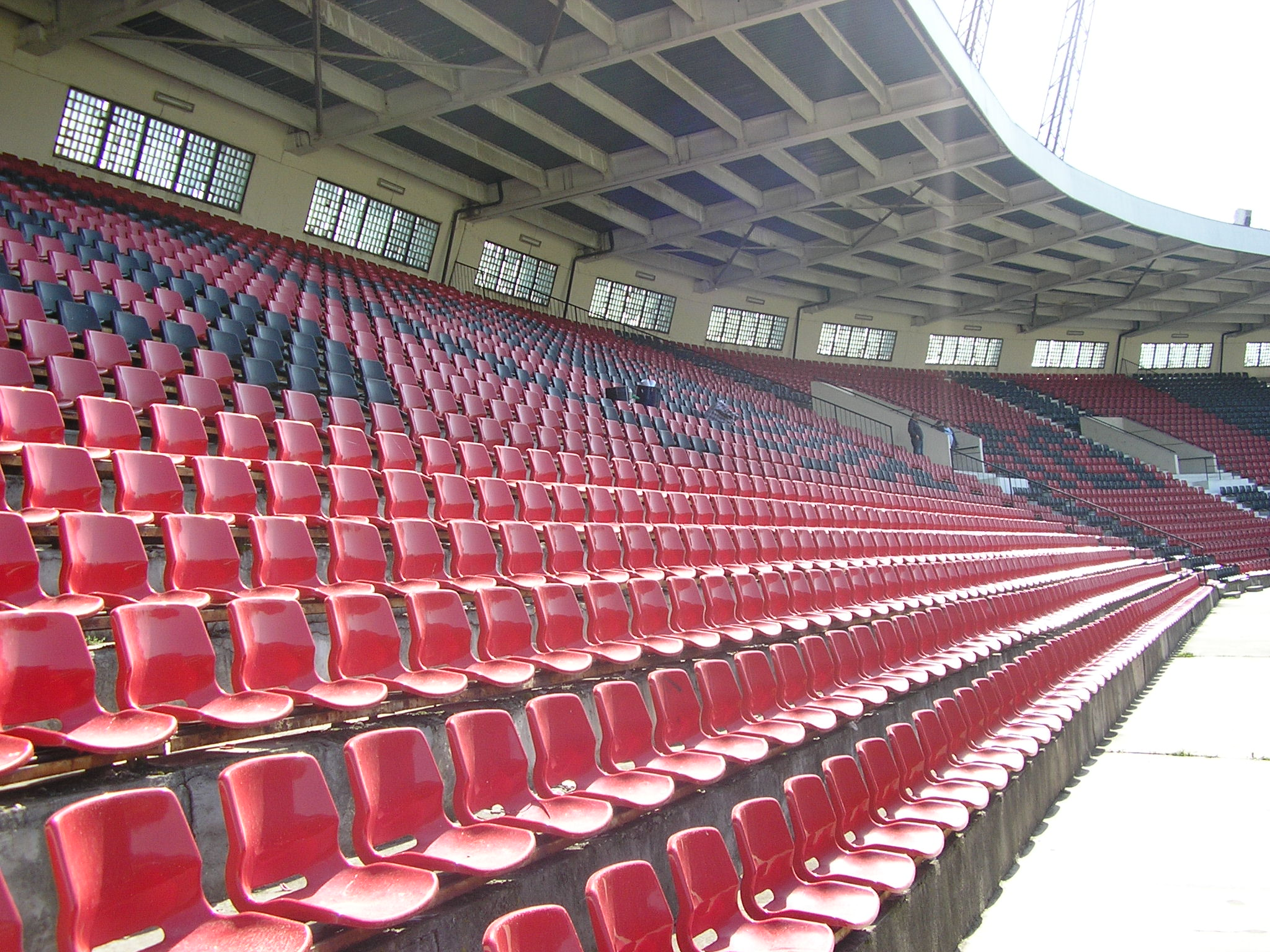

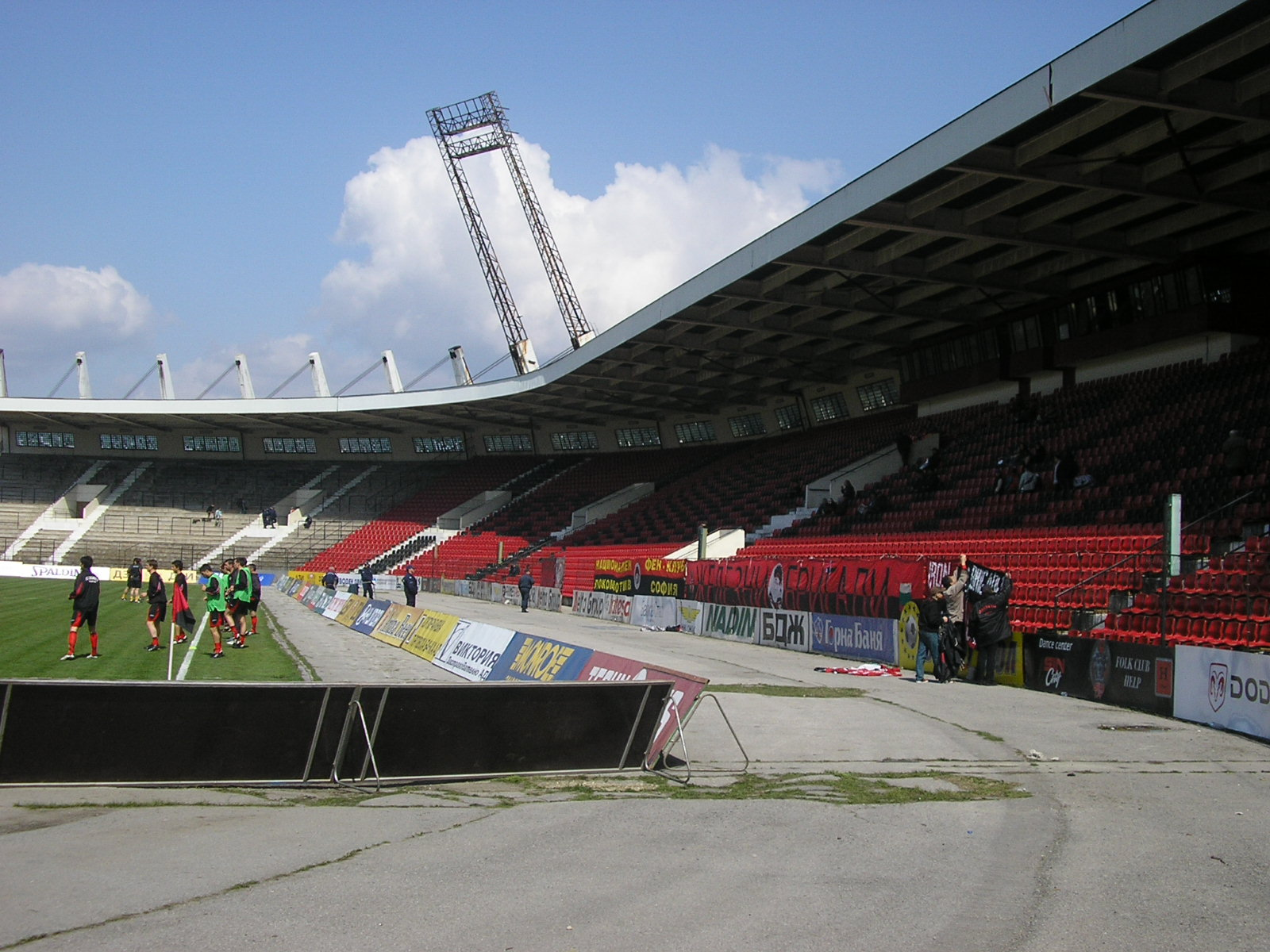

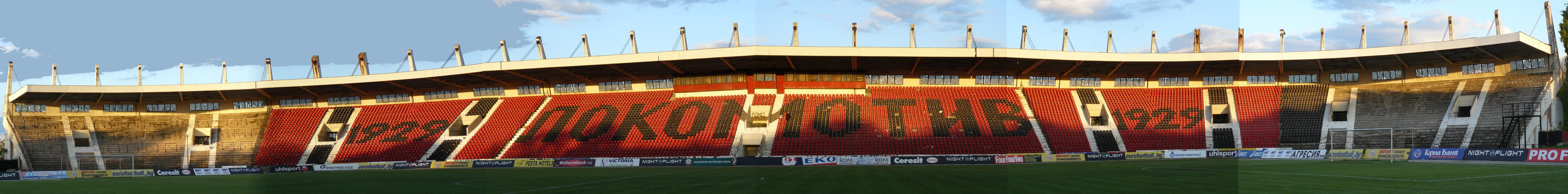

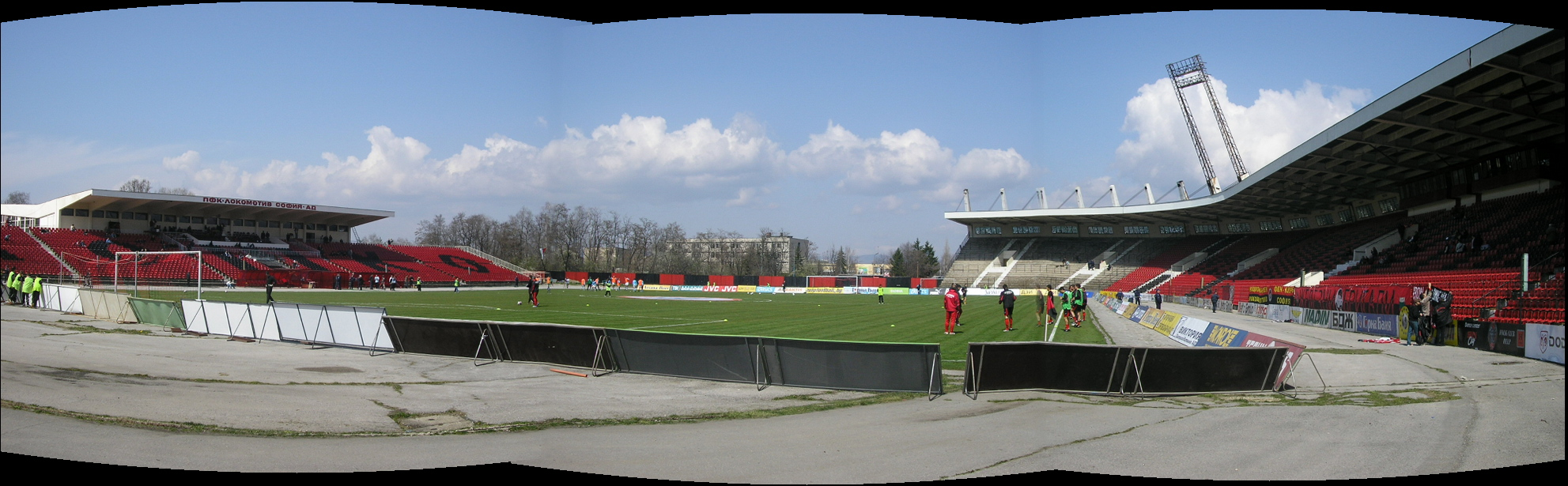
