= Tsvetomir Panov =

Bulgarian footballer (born 1989)

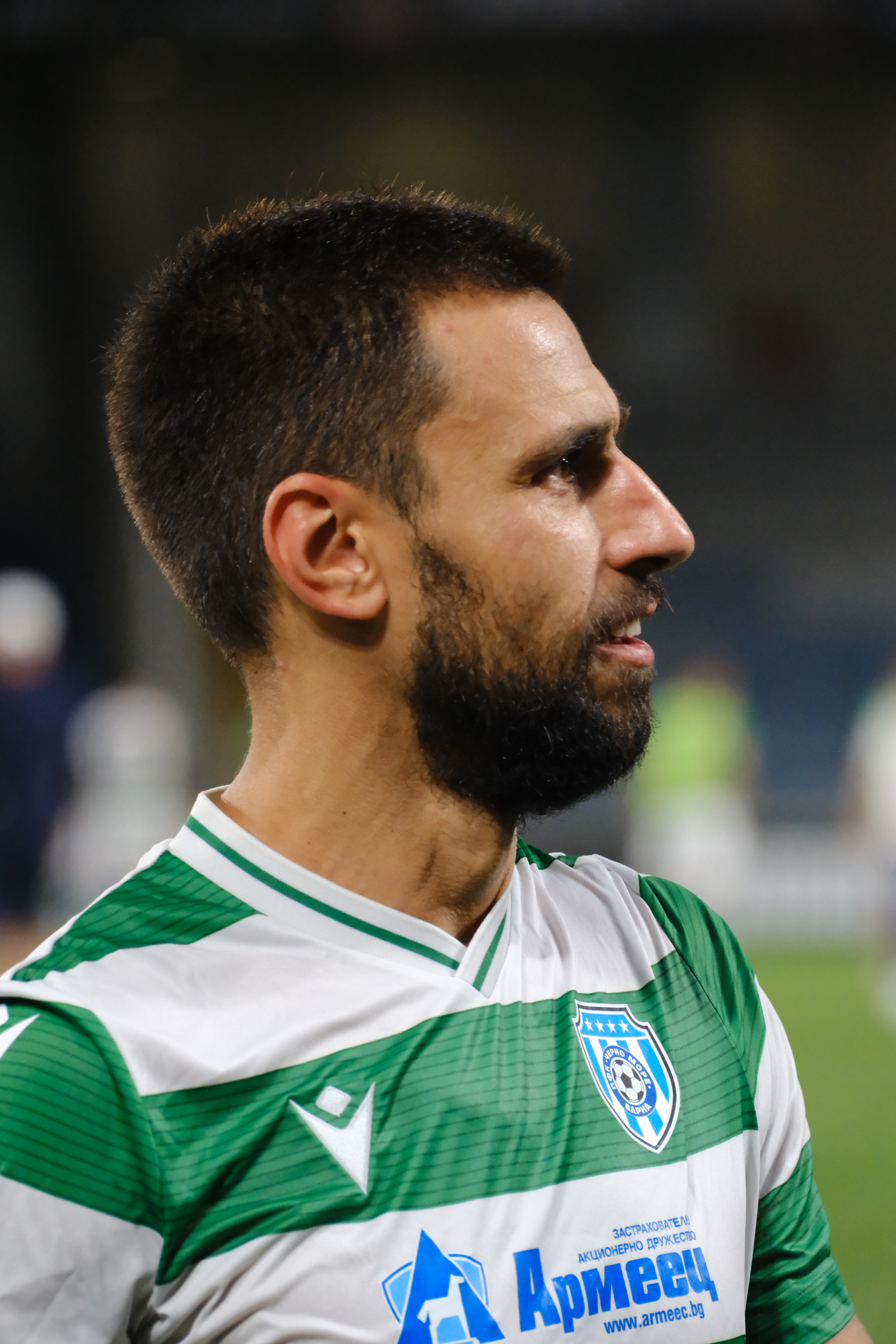

Personal information
- Full name: Tsvetomir Bozhidarov Panov
- Date of birth: 17 April 1989 (age 37)
- Place of birth: Pleven, Bulgaria
- Height: 1.72 m (5 ft 7 1/2 in)
- Positions: Right-back; left-back

Youth career
- 1998–2006: Spartak Pleven

Senior career*
Years	Team	Apps	(Gls)
2006–2008	Spartak Pleven	49	(0)
2009–2012	Litex Lovech	2	(0)
2010–2012	→ Vidima-Rakovski (loan)	51	(1)
2012–2013	Spartak Pleven	22	(0)
2013	Lyubimets	16	(0)
2014–2016	Slavia Sofia	69	(1)
2016–2018	Botev Plovdiv	49	(1)
2018	Ludogorets Razgrad	9	(0)
2018	Ludogorets Razgrad II	7	(0)
2019–2026	Cherno More	183	(3)

International career
2006–2008	Bulgaria U19	5	(0)
2008–2009	Bulgaria U21	1	(0)
2017–2020	Bulgaria	1	(0)
- * Club domestic league appearances and goals as of 13 October 2026

Tsvetomir Panov (Bulgarian: Цветомир Панов; born 17 April 1989) is a Bulgarian professional footballer who plays as a defender.

== Career ==
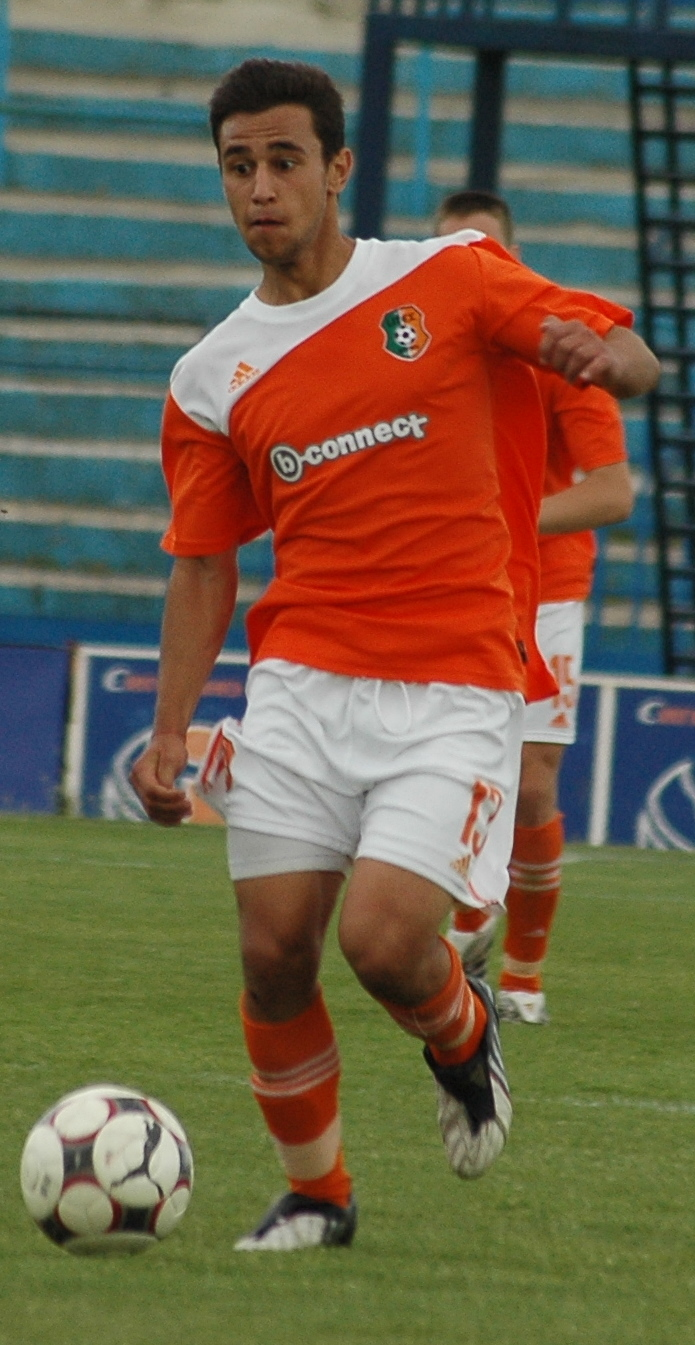
Panov with Litex Lovech in 2009

Panov came to Litex Lovech from Spartak Pleven in January 2009. For three seasons with Spartak he earned 49 appearances playing in the Second League. He made his team debut for Litex on 3 February 2009, in a 5-1 friendly drubbing of Chinese vice-champion Shanghai Shenhua.

Panov played for Slavia Sofia between 2013 and 2016. He was part of the squad that finished on 4th place during season 2015–16.

=== Botev Plovdiv ===
On 9 June 2016, Panov signed a one-year contract with Botev Plovdiv. On 30 July 2016, he made his debut in a 1–1 draw against the local rivals Lokomotiv Plovdiv.

On 9 December 2017, Panov scored his first goal for Botev for the 3–0 win over Etar Veliko Tarnovo. His outstanding performance earned him the award for man of the match.

On 20 February 2018 Panov was sold to Ludogorets.

== International career ==
Between 2006 and 2008 Panov was part of the Bulgaria national under-19 football team. With the team he played at the 2008 UEFA European Under-19 Football Championship in the Czech Republic.

On 21 August 2017, Panov and his teammate from Botev Plovdiv Todor Nedelev were called for the games of the Bulgaria national football team. Panov remained an unused substitute during the historical 3–2 win over Sweden. Several weeks later, at the beginning of October 2017, he was again included in the Bulgaria national football team. He finally made a debut in the national team on 26 March 2018 in a 2–1 win against Kazakhstan.

== Honours ==
Botev Plovdiv

- Bulgarian Cup: 2016–17
- Bulgarian Supercup: 2017

Ludogorets

- Bulgarian First League: 2017–18
- Bulgarian Supercup: 2018
