= Fernando Silva (footballer, born 1991) =

Brazilian footballer

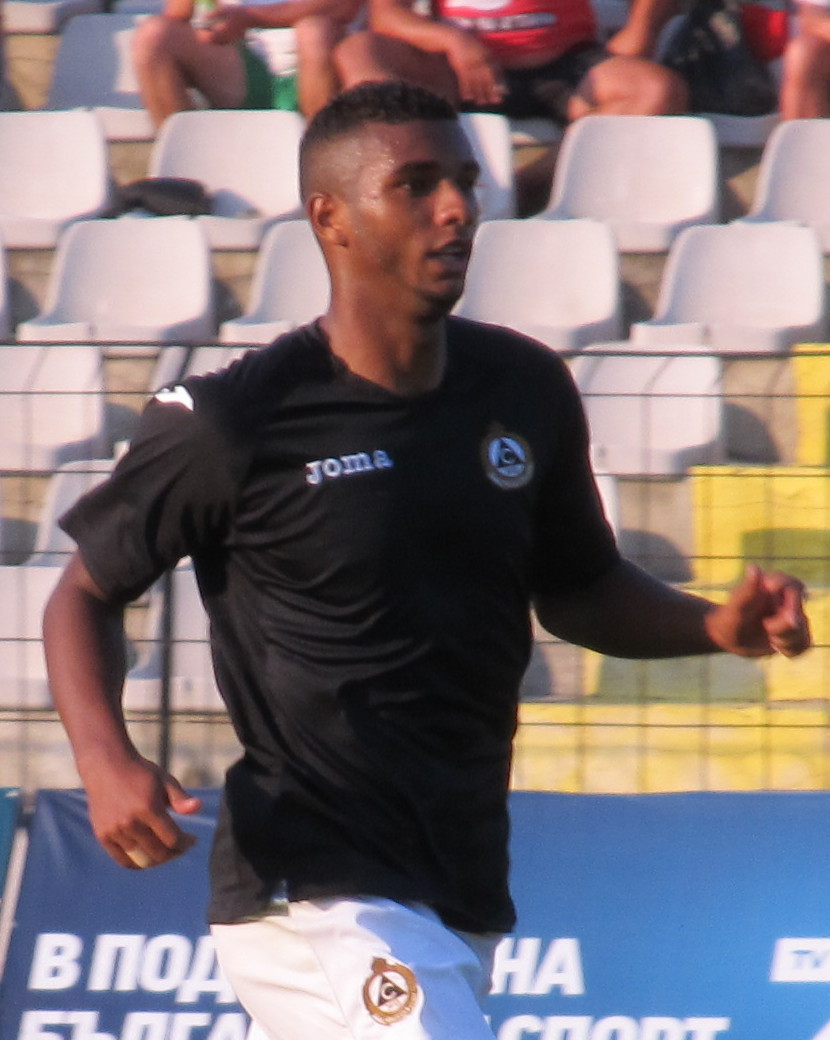
- Fernando Silva with Slavia Sofia in 2013

Personal information
- Full name: Fernando Silva dos Santos
- Date of birth: May 18, 1991 (age 35)
- Place of birth: Brazil
- Height: 1.74 m (5 ft 9 in)
- Positions: Winger; midfielder

Senior career*
Years	Team	Apps	(Gls)
2012	Caldense	0	(0)
2012	ABC	1	(0)
2013–2015	Slavia Sofia	46	(7)
2015	Şanlıurfaspor	3	(0)
2015–2016	Aves	13	(1)
2016	Montana	12	(0)
2017	Pelister	29	(4)
2018	Renova	16	(0)
2019	Cascavel	0	(0)
2019	CA Juventus	0	(0)
2020–	Borec	5	(1)
- * Club domestic league appearances and goals as of 22:36, 15 May 2020 (UTC)

Fernando Silva dos Santos (born 18 May 1991) is a Brazilian footballer who plays as a winger for FK Borec.

== Career ==
In June 2013, Silva signed with Bulgarian side Slavia Sofia on a three-year deal.

== Statistics ==
Professional Club Performance
Club	Season	League		State league		Cup		Continental		Total	
Club	Season	Apps	Goals	Apps	Goals	Apps	Goals	Apps	Goals	Apps	Goals
Brazil		Brasileirão		Paulista		Copa do Brasil		Copa Libertadores^{1}		Total	
Caldense	2012	0	0	4	0	0	0	–		4	0
ABC	2012	1	0	0	0	0	0	–		1	0
Bulgaria		A Group		Bulgarian Supercup		Bulgarian Cup		Europe		Total	
Slavia Sofia	2013–14	32	7	0	0	4	1	–		36	8
Slavia Sofia	2014–15	14	0	0	0	1	0	–		15	0
Total		47	7	4	0	5	1	0	0	56	8

== Honours ==
Pelister

- Macedonian Cup: 2016–17
