= Stadion Aleksandar Shalamanov =

Sport stadium in Sofia, Bulgaria

- Interactive map of Stadion Aleksandar Shalamanov
- Full name: Stadion Aleksandar Shalamanov
- Former names: Slavia Stadium (1958–2021)
- Location: Sofia, Bulgaria
- Coordinates: 42°40′31″N 23°16′19″E
- Owner: Slavia Sofia
- Operator: Slavia Sofia
- Capacity: 25,000
- Surface: Grass
- Field size: 105 X 68

Construction
- Built: 1958

Tenants
- Slavia Sofia (1932–present); Bulgaria U21 (2009–present)

Stadion Aleksandar Shalamanov (Bulgarian: Стадион „Александър Шаламанов“) is a multi-purpose stadium in the Slavia district of Sofia, Bulgaria named after the football legend Aleksandar Shalamanov. It is currently used for football matches and is the home ground of the local football club PFC Slavia Sofia. The stadium has a seating capacity of 25,000 and is one of the biggest sport facilities in Bulgaria.

The stadium is part of a multifunctional sport complex, which includes two football training grounds, one multi-purpose indoor hall and an ice-hockey arena with a capacity of 2,000 spectators.

Also, as of 2009, the Bulgaria national under-21 football team plays some of its home matches at this stadium.

On 26 October 2021, a day after Slavia's legend Aleksandar Shalamanov died, the team announced that the stadium would be renamed in his honour and would take the name Aleksandar Shalamanov Stadium.

== Old Slavia Stadium ==
The original home ground of Slavia was located just to the northwest of Ruski Pametnik near the center of Sofia. It was built in the mid-1920s and demolished in the late 1940s.
