= 2014–15 PFC CSKA Sofia season =

CSKA Sofia
2014–15 season
- Chairman: Red Champions Group
- Manager: Stoycho Mladenov (until 20 March 2015); Galin Ivanov (until 28 April 2015); Lyuboslav Penev (since 28 April 2015)
- A Group: 5th
- Bulgarian Cup: First round
- Europa League: 2nd Qualification round
Home colours	Away colours

The 2014–15 season was PFC CSKA Sofia's 67th consecutive season in A Group. This article shows player statistics and all matches (official and friendly) that the club will play during the 2014–15 season.

== Players ==
=== Squad stats ===
No.	Pos	Nat	Player	Total		A Group		Bulgarian Cup		Europa League	
No.	Pos	Nat	Player	Apps	Goals	Apps	Goals	Apps	Goals	Apps	Goals
1	GK	(Bulgaria) BUL	Anatoli Gospodinov	6	0	6	0	0	0	0	0
3	DF	(Bulgaria) BUL	Aleksandar Tunchev	29	4	28	4	0	0	1	0
4	MF	(Nigeria) NGR	Sunny	29	0	28	0	0	0	1	0
5	MF	(Croatia) CRO	Mario Brkljača	7	0	3+4	0	0	0	0	0
7	MF	(Portugal) POR	Toni Silva	30	6	22+5	5	0+1	1	2	0
8	MF	(Bulgaria) BUL	Boris Galchev	26	2	15+9	2	0	0	1+1	0
9	FW	(Montenegro) MNE	Stefan Nikolić	10	0	7+3	0	0	0	0	0
10	MF	(Serbia) SRB	Ivan Marković	2	1	2	1	0	0	0	0
11	MF	(Serbia) SRB	Nemanja Milisavljević	23	1	14+8	1	1	0	0	0
13	FW	(Luxembourg) LUX	Aurélien Joachim	23	5	6+14	5	0+1	0	1+1	0
14	DF	(Bulgaria) BUL	Valentin Iliev	12	1	11+1	1	0	0	0	0
16	MF	(Bulgaria) BUL	Petar Vitanov	2	0	2	0	0	0	0	0
19	DF	(Bulgaria) BUL	Apostol Popov	21	0	17+1	0	1	0	2	0
20	MF	(Cape Verde) CPV	Platini	25	1	13+11	1	0+1	0	0	0
21	DF	(Bulgaria) BUL	Ventsislav Vasilev	24	0	21+1	0	0	0	2	0
22	MF	(Brazil) BRA	Edenilson	14	1	5+6	1	1	0	2	0
25	DF	(Bulgaria) BUL	Sava Savov	1	0	0+1	0	0	0	0	0
28	MF	(Bulgaria) BUL	Marquinhos	27	3	18+6	3	1	0	2	0
31	DF	(Netherlands) NED	Christian Supusepa	10	0	6+1	0	1	0	1+1	0
33	GK	(Czech Republic) CZE	Jakub Diviš	27	0	24	0	1	0	2	0
34	MF	(Ukraine) UKR	Denis Prychynenko	12	0	7+4	0	1	0	0	0
48	DF	(Croatia) CRO	Marin Oršulić	16	2	14+2	2	0	0	0	0
66	DF	(Bulgaria) BUL	Plamen Krachunov	6	0	3+1	0	0	0	2	0
70	MF	(Brazil) BRA	Juan Felipe	29	3	23+5	3	1	0	0	0
73	FW	(Bulgaria) BUL	Ivan Stoyanov	8	0	4+2	0	0	0	2	0
77	DF	(Croatia) CRO	Tonći Kukoč	23	2	22	2	1	0	0	0
92	GK	(Latvia) LAT	Maksims Uvarenko	2	0	2	0	0	0	0	0
99	GK	(Bulgaria) BUL	Stoyan Kolev	1	0	0+1	0	0	0	0	0
Players sold or loaned out after the start of the season:
5	DF	(Netherlands) NED	Cendrino Misidjan	1	0	1	0	0	0	0	0
9	FW	(Bulgaria) BUL	Martin Kamburov	2	0	0	0	0	0	1+1	0
17	FW	(Romania) ROU	Sergiu Buș	21	10	18+1	10	1	0	0+1	0
71	MF	(Bulgaria) BUL	Anton Karachanakov	17	5	10+5	4	1	0	0+1	1
88	MF	(Angola) ANG	Amâncio Fortes	0	0	0	0	0	0	0	0
92	GK	(Algeria) ALG	Raïs M'Bolhi	0	0	0	0	0	0	0	0

As of 31 May 2015

=== Top scorers ===
Place	Position	Nation	Number	Name	A Group	Bulgarian Cup	Europa League	Total
1	FW	(Romania)	17	Sergiu Buș	10	0	0	10
2	MF	(Portugal)	7	Toni Silva	5	1	0	6
#	FW	(Luxembourg)	13	Aurélien Joachim	5	0	0	5
#	MF	(Bulgaria)	71	Anton Karachanakov	4	0	1	5
5	DF	(Bulgaria)	3	Aleksandar Tunchev	4	0	0	4
6	MF	(Bulgaria)	28	Marquinhos	3	0	0	3
#	MF	(Brazil)	70	Juan Felipe	3	0	0	3
8	MF	(Bulgaria)	8	Boris Galchev	2	0	0	2
#	DF	(Croatia)	48	Marin Oršulić	2	0	0	2
#	DF	(Croatia)	77	Tonći Kukoč	2	0	0	2
11	MF	(Serbia)	10	Ivan Marković	1	0	0	1
#	MF	(Serbia)	11	Nemanja Milisavljević	1	0	0	1
#	DF	(Bulgaria)	14	Valentin Iliev	1	0	0	1
#	MF	(Cape Verde)	20	Platini	1	0	0	1
#	MF	(Brazil)	22	Edenilson	1	0	0	1
				TOTALS	45	1	1	47

As of 31 May 2015

=== Disciplinary record ===
Number	Nation	Position	Name	A Group		Bulgarian Cup		Europa League		Total	
Number	Nation	Position	Name	Yellow card	Red card	Yellow card	Red card	Yellow card	Red card	Yellow card	Red card
3	(Bulgaria)	DF	Aleksandar Tunchev	1	0	0	0	0	0	1	0
4	(Nigeria)	MF	Sunny	12	0	0	0	0	0	12	0
6	(Bulgaria)	DF	Plamen Krachunov	0	0	0	0	1	0	1	0
7	(Portugal)	MF	Toni Silva	7	1	0	0	0	0	7	1
8	(Bulgaria)	MF	Boris Galchev	5	0	0	0	0	0	5	0
9	(Montenegro)	FW	Stefan Nikolić	4	1	0	0	0	0	4	1
10	(Serbia)	MF	Ivan Marković	1	0	0	0	0	0	1	0
11	(Serbia)	MF	Nemanja Milisavljević	3	0	0	0	0	0	3	0
13	(Luxembourg)	FW	Aurélien Joachim	1	0	0	0	1	0	2	0
14	(Bulgaria)	DF	Valentin Iliev	6	0	0	0	0	0	6	0
17	(Romania)	FW	Sergiu Buș	1	0	0	0	0	0	1	0
19	(Bulgaria)	DF	Apostol Popov	5	1	0	0	0	0	5	1
20	(Cape Verde)	MF	Platini	5	1	1	0	0	0	6	1
21	(Bulgaria)	DF	Ventsislav Vasilev	9	0	0	0	0	0	9	0
22	(Brazil)	MF	Edenilson	3	0	1	0	0	1	4	1
28	(Bulgaria)	MF	Marquinhos	8	2	1	0	1	0	10	2
31	(Netherlands)	DF	Christian Supusepa	3	0	0	0	0	0	3	0
33	(Czech Republic)	GK	Jakub Diviš	3	0	0	0	0	0	3	0
34	(Ukraine)	MF	Denis Prychynenko	4	0	1	0	0	0	5	0
48	(Croatia)	DF	Marin Oršulić	4	0	0	0	0	0	4	0
66	(Bulgaria)	DF	Plamen Krachunov	1	0	0	0	0	0	1	0
70	(Brazil)	MF	Juan Felipe	1	0	0	0	0	0	1	0
71	(Bulgaria)	MF	Anton Karachanakov	1	0	0	0	0	0	1	0
73	(Bulgaria)	FW	Ivan Stoyanov	1	0	0	0	0	0	1	0
77	(Croatia)	DF	Tonći Kukoč	6	0	0	0	0	0	6	0
			TOTALS	95	6	4	0	3	1	102	7

As of 31 May 2015

== Players in/out ==
=== Summer transfers ===
In: Note: Flags indicate national team as defined under FIFA eligibility rules; some limited exceptions apply. Players may hold more than one non-FIFA nationality.

No.	Pos.	Nation	Player
1	GK	BUL	Anatoli Gospodinov (loan return from Vitosha Bistritsa)
3	DF	BUL	Aleksandar Tunchev (from Lokomotiv Plovdiv)
5	DF	NED	Cendrino Misidjan (from (Netherlands) Sparta Rotterdam)
9	FW	BUL	Martin Kamburov (from Lokomotiv Plovdiv)
13	FW	LUX	Aurélien Joachim (from (Netherlands) RKC Waalwijk)
17	FW	ROU	Sergiu Buș (from (Romania) CFR Cluj)
20	MF	CPV	Platini (from (Cyprus) Omonia)
22	MF	BRA	Edenilson (from Cherno More Varna)
28	MF	BUL	Marquinhos (from Lokomotiv Sofia)
31	DF	NED	Christian Supusepa (from (Netherlands) ADO Den Haag)
33	GK	CZE	Jakub Diviš (from (Czech Republic) FK Mladá Boleslav)
34	MF	UKR	Denis Prychynenko (from (Ukraine) Sevastopol)
48	DF	CRO	Marin Oršulić (from (Croatia) NK Zadar)
70	MF	BRA	Juan Felipe (from (Brazil) São Carlos)
77	DF	CRO	Tonći Kukoč (from (Italy) Brescia)

Out: Note: Flags indicate national team as defined under FIFA eligibility rules; some limited exceptions apply. Players may hold more than one non-FIFA nationality.

No.	Pos.	Nation	Player
2	DF	BUL	Zdravko Iliev (released)
5	MF	BUL	Todor Yanchev (retired)
6	DF	SEN	Jackson Mendy (terminated contract)
9	FW	BUL	Martin Kamburov (to Lokomotiv Plovdiv)
10	MF	BRA	Marcinho (to (Russia) Ufa)
12	GK	CZE	Tomáš Černý (released)
17	MF	BUL	Martin Petrov (retired)
18	MF	BUL	Ivaylo Chochev (to (Italy) Palermo)
20	FW	BEN	Omar Kossoko (end of contract)
23	MF	BUL	Emil Gargorov (terminated contract)
26	FW	ARG	Guido Di Vanni (end of contract)
27	DF	ESP	Brian Herrero (released)
37	DF	FRA	Jérémy Faug-Porret (end of contract)
45	FW	BUL	Grigor Dolapchiev (loaned at (North Macedonia) Horizont Turnovo)
92	GK	ALG	Raïs M'Bolhi (to (United States) Philadelphia Union)

=== Winter transfers ===
In: Note: Flags indicate national team as defined under FIFA eligibility rules; some limited exceptions apply. Players may hold more than one non-FIFA nationality.

No.	Pos.	Nation	Player
5	MF	CRO	Mario Brkljača (from (Austria) SV Mattersburg)
9	FW	MNE	Stefan Nikolić (from (South Korea) Incheon United FC)
15	MF	IND	Renedy Singh (from (India) Kerala Blasters FC)
88	MF	ANG	Amâncio Fortes (from (Portugal) CD Fátima)
92	GK	LAT	Maksims Uvarenko (from (Latvia) FK Ventspils)
—	GK	MAR	Yassine El Kharroubi (from FC Vereya, contract starts from 1 June 2015)

Out: Note: Flags indicate national team as defined under FIFA eligibility rules; some limited exceptions apply. Players may hold more than one non-FIFA nationality.

No.	Pos.	Nation	Player
5	DF	NED	Cendrino Misidjan (Released)
17	FW	ROU	Sergiu Buș (to (England) Sheffield Wednesday)
30	DF	BUL	Vasil Popov (loaned at Etar Veliko Tarnovo)
32	FW	BUL	Radoy Bozhilov (loaned at Dobrudzha Dobrich)
45	FW	BUL	Grigor Dolapchiev (loaned at Haskovo, previously on loan at Horizont Turnovo)
46	DF	BUL	Toni Stoichkov (loaned at Cherno More Varna, contract terminated)
47	DF	BUL	Bozhidar Chorbadzhiyski (loaned at Pirin Blagoevgrad)
71	MF	BUL	Anton Karachanakov (Contract terminated)
88	MF	ANG	Amâncio Fortes (Contract terminated)
—	FW	BUL	Dimitar Maymunkov (loaned at Slivnishki Geroy, contract terminated)
—	MF	BUL	Pol Aleksandrov (loaned at Bansko)

== Preseason and friendlies ==
Win Draw Loss Fixtures

=== Preseason ===
21 June 2014 Friendly	CSKA	2–1	Marek	Samokov
11:00	Kamburov 19' (pen.); Marquinhos 84'	Report	Petkov 22'	Stadium: Iskar; Attendance: 500

25 June 2014 Friendly	CSKA (Bulgaria)	1–1	(Russia) Krylia Sovetov	Hoenderloo, Netherlands
17:00	Stoyanov 50'	Report	Drahun (penalty missed) 21'; Yeliseyev 80'	Attendance: 150

28 June 2014 Friendly	CSKA (Bulgaria)	1–1	(Belgium) Gent	Heeze-Leende, Netherlands
17:00	Silva 32'	Report	Gershon 10'	Attendance: 300

1 July 2014 Friendly	CSKA (Bulgaria)	0–1	(Belgium) White Star	Ermelo, Netherlands
15:00		Report	Lempereur 78'	Attendance: 100

5 July 2014 Friendly	CSKA (Bulgaria)	3–2	(Belgium) Club Brugge	Garderen, Netherlands
16:30	Silva 16'; Tunchev 31'; Marković 83'	Report	Vázquez 19'; Wang 64'	Attendance: 100

8 July 2014 Friendly	CSKA (Bulgaria)	0–2	(Belgium) Genk	Bree, Belgium
19:00		Report	Mbodj 6'; Ojo 59'	Attendance: 1,500

12 July 2014 Friendly	CSKA	0–0	Beroe	Sofia
17:00	Tunchev (yellow card) 34'; Krachunov (yellow card) 36'	Report	Hristov (penalty missed) 38'; Kostadinov (yellow card) 44'; Djoman (yellow card) 69'	Stadium: Balgarska Armiya; Attendance: 5,000; Referee: Yoto Garabedov (Sofia)

=== On-season (autumn) ===
7 September 2014 Friendly	CSKA (Bulgaria)	3–2	(Ukraine) Metalurh Donetsk	Sofia
18:00	Joachim 3'; Felipe 33'; Milisavljević 78'	Report	Lazić 4'; Alexandre 73'	Stadium: Balgarska Armiya; Attendance: 6,000

10 October 2014 Friendly	Pirin	1–0	CSKA	Blagoevgrad
16:00	Popev 45'			Stadium: Hristo Botev

11 October 2014 Friendly	CSKA (Bulgaria)	2–1	(Serbia) Radnički Niš	Sofia
18:00	Edenilson 75'; Bozhilov 90+3'	Report	Punoševac 90'	Stadium: Balgarska Armiya

15 November 2014 Friendly	Lokomotiv	3–2	CSKA	Gorna Oryahovitsa
14:30	Goranov 20'; N. Ivanov 82'; Penev 88'		Buș 6' (pen.); Bozhilov 59'	Stadium: Lokomotiv

16 December 2014 Friendly	Dunav	0–2	CSKA	Ruse
13:30			Joachim 48'; Karachanakov 82'	Stadium: Gradski

=== Mid-season ===
21 January 2015 Friendly	CSKA (Bulgaria)	1–0	(Germany) Aalen	Side, Turkey
15:00	Joachim 16' (pen.)		Klauß (penalty missed) 25'

22 January 2015 Friendly	CSKA (Bulgaria)	2–1	(Ukraine) Metalist Kharkiv	Side, Turkey
15:00	Felipe 39'; Joachim 85'		Kobin 45' (pen.)

28 January 2015 Friendly	CSKA (Bulgaria)	1–0	(Poland) Śląsk Wrocław	Side, Turkey
15:00	Marquinhos 34'

31 January 2015 Friendly	CSKA (Bulgaria)	1–2	(Austria) Rapid Vienna	Side, Turkey
15:00	Milisavljević 37'		Alar 8'; Starkl 85'

3 February 2015 Friendly	CSKA (Bulgaria)	0–1	(Romania) Steaua București	Side, Turkey
17:30			Popa 45'

6 February 2015 Friendly	CSKA (Bulgaria)	3–2	(Czech Republic) Slovan Liberec	Side, Turkey
17:00	Platini 45'; Prychynenko 66'; Galchev 67'		Ndiaye 42'; Frýdek 77'

9 February 2015 Friendly	CSKA (Bulgaria)	1–2	(Denmark) SønderjyskE	Side, Turkey
17:00	Galchev 75'		Absalonsen 26', 56'

12 February 2015 Friendly	CSKA (Bulgaria)	1–0	(Romania) Petrolul Ploiești	Side, Turkey
15:30	Joachim 42'

15 February 2015 Friendly	CSKA (Bulgaria)	1–2	(Norway) Strømsgodset	Side, Turkey
17:00	Joachim 25' (pen.)		Kastrati 18'; Vilsvik 55' (pen.)

21 February 2015 Friendly	Vereya	0–1	CSKA	Stara Zagora
15:30			Silva 45'	Stadium: Trace Arena

=== On-season (spring) ===
28 March 2015 Friendly	Turnovo (North Macedonia)	2–2	(Bulgaria) CSKA	Turnovo, Macedonia
15:00	Georgiev 70'; Atanasov 90+2'		Nikolić 8'; Milisavljević 24'

== Competitions ==
=== A Group ===
==== First phase ====
===== Table =====
Pos	Team	Pld	W	D	L	GF	GA	GD	Pts	Qualification
1	Ludogorets Razgrad	22	14	5	3	46	14	+32	47	Qualification for championship group
2	CSKA Sofia	22	13	5	4	39	15	+24	44	Qualification for championship group
3	Lokomotiv Sofia	22	12	3	7	29	24	+5	39 (Note: Lokomotiv Sofia ahead of Litex Lovech on head-to-head away goals scored; Lokomotiv Sofia–Litex Lovech 2–0, Litex Lovech–Lokomotiv Sofia 4–2.)	Qualification for championship group
4	Litex Lovech	22	12	3	7	37	24	+13	39	Qualification for championship group
5	Beroe Stara Zagora	22	11	5	6	34	21	+13	38	Qualification for championship group

Source: bulgarian-football.com
Rules for classification: 1st points; 2nd head-to-head points; 3rd head-to-head goal difference; 4th head-to-head goals scored; 5th head-to-head away goals scored; 6th season goal difference; 7th season goals scored; 8th "sportsmanship" (R & Y cards); 9th draw

===== Results summary =====
Overall								Home						Away					
Pld	W	D	L	GF	GA	GD	Pts	W	D	L	GF	GA	GD	W	D	L	GF	GA	GD
22	13	5	4	39	15	+24	44	8	2	1	23	3	+20	5	3	3	16	12	+4

Last updated: 15 March 2015.
Source: Soccerway

===== Results by round =====
Round	1	2	3	4	5	6	7	8	9	10	11	12	13	14	15	16	17	18	19	20	21	22
Ground	A	H	A	H	A	H	A	A	H	A	H	H	A	H	A	H	A	H	H	A	H	A
Result	W	W	D	W	L	W	W	D	W	W	W	W	W	D	W	D	D	W	W	L	L	L
Position	2	1	1	1	2	1	1	1	1	1	1	1	1	1	1	1	1	1	1	1	2	2

Source: See Results
A = Away; H = Home; W = Win; D = Draw; L = Loss

===== Fixtures and results =====
20 July 2014 1	Litex	0–1	CSKA	Lovech
19:30	Asprilla (yellow card) 44'; Bozhikov (yellow card) 90+3'	Report	Marquinhos 67'; Sunny (yellow card) 25'; Supusepa (yellow card) 36'; Vasilev (yellow card) 85'; Oršulić (yellow card) 89'	Stadium: Gradski; Attendance: 3,030; Referee: Ivaylo Stoyanov (Petrich)

27 July 2014 2	CSKA	2–0	Levski	Sofia
19:30	Karachanakov 47'; Buș 56'; Marquinhos (yellow card) 35' (yellow-red card) 63'; Edenilson (yellow card) 62'; Diviš (yellow card) 90+5'	Report	Pedro (yellow card) 24' (yellow-red card) 83'; Minev (yellow card) 37'; Gadzhev (yellow card) 62'; Ognyanov (yellow card) 66'; Belaïd (yellow card) 72'	Stadium: Vasil Levski; Attendance: 11,420; Referee: Georgi Yordanov (Gabrovo)

3 August 2014 3	Slavia	2–2	CSKA	Sofia
18:00	Burgzorg 42'; Michel 62'; Pirgov (yellow card) 60'; Vezalov (yellow card) 83'; Ristevski (yellow card) 87'	Report	Buș 9'; Tunchev 55'; Supusepa (yellow card) 48'; Galchev (yellow card) 78'; Silva (yellow card) 81'; Popov (yellow card) 90'	Stadium: Ovcha Kupel; Attendance: 3,630; Referee: Nikola Popov (Sofia)

10 August 2014 4	CSKA	4–0	Haskovo	Sofia
20:00	Iliev 23'; Silva 34'; Joachim 88'; Buș 90+2'; Platini (yellow card) 45+1'	Report	Velev (yellow card) 22'	Stadium: Balgarska Armiya; Attendance: 1,280; Referee: Vladimir Valkov (Plovdiv)

16 August 2014 5	Ludogorets	2–0	CSKA	Razgrad
20:00	Misidjan 30'; Younés 51'; Anicet (yellow card) 28'	Report	Popov (yellow card) 20'; Iliev (yellow card) 47'; Sunny (yellow card) 58'; Buș (yellow card) 62'; Marquinhos (yellow card) 82'; Silva (yellow card) 88'	Stadium: Ludogorets Arena; Attendance: 5,470; Referee: Stanislav Stavrov (Veliko Tarnovo)

22 August 2014 6	CSKA	5–0	Marek	Sofia
20:00	Buș 16'; Karachanakov 23'; Kukoč 35'; Tunchev 74'; Marquinhos 87'; Karachanakov (yellow card) 20'; Sunny (yellow card) 90'	Report	B. Nikolov (yellow card) 89'; Lahchev (yellow card) 90'	Stadium: Balgarska Armiya; Attendance: 1,290; Referee: Angel Angelov (Sofia)

30 August 2014 7	Lokomotiv Plovdiv	0–3	CSKA	Plovdiv
20:00	Dyakov (yellow card) 36'; Granchov (yellow card) 37'; Nakov (yellow card) 45+1'; Iliev (yellow card) 89'	Report	Silva 49'; Buș 70'; Felipe 90+3'; Sunny (yellow card) 22'; Edenilson (yellow card) 27'; Marquinhos (yellow card) 51'; Kukoč (yellow card) 68'; Platini (yellow card) 82'	Stadium: Lauta; Attendance: 4,180; Referee: Vihren Manev (Sofia)

13 September 2014 8	Cherno More	1–1	CSKA	Varna
17:00	Petkov 85'; Venkov (yellow card) 68'	Report	Felipe 32'; Silva (yellow card) 49'; Iliev (yellow card) 57'; Platini (yellow card) 83'; Edenilson (yellow card) 90+5'	Stadium: Ticha; Attendance: 4,500; Referee: Nikola Popov (Sofia)

20 September 2014 9	CSKA	3–0	Lokomotiv Sofia	Sofia
19:00	Felipe 52'; Buș 57'; Joachim 90+4'; Kukoč (yellow card) 20'; Marquinhos (yellow card) 56'; Prychynenko (yellow card) 61'; Platini (yellow card) 65'; Vasilev (yellow card) 68'; Sunny (yellow card) 72'	Report	Trifonov (yellow card) 17'; Branekov (yellow card) 42'; Ivanov (yellow card) 44'; Genov (yellow card) 78'	Stadium: Balgarska Armiya; Attendance: 1,920; Referee: Tsvetan Krastev (Varna)

28 September 2014 10	Beroe	1–2	CSKA	Stara Zagora
19:30	Bakalov 10'; Djoman (yellow card) 27'; Elias (yellow card) 74'	Report	Karachanakov 69'; Buș 80'; Silva (yellow card) 35'; Sunny (yellow card) 45+1'; Iliev (yellow card) 55'; Joachim (yellow card) 87'	Stadium: Beroe; Attendance: 8,680; Referee: Ivaylo Stoyanov (Petrich)

3 October 2014 11	CSKA	1–0	Botev	Sofia
18:45	Silva 67'; Iliev (yellow card) 40'; Sunny (yellow card) 89'	Report	Chunchukov (yellow card) 4'; Inez (yellow card) 33'; Jirsák (yellow card) 86'	Stadium: Balgarska Armiya; Attendance: 3,100; Referee: Georgi Yordanov (Gabrovo)

18 October 2014 12	CSKA	2–0	Litex	Sofia
19:30	Tunchev 17'; Edenilson 88'; Kukoč (yellow card) 38'; Vasilev (yellow card) 79'	Report	Mendy (yellow card) 26'	Stadium: Balgarska Armiya; Attendance: 4,220; Referee: Nikola Popov (Sofia)

25 October 2014 13	Levski	0–3	CSKA	Sofia
16:00	Krumov (yellow card) 10'; Pedro (yellow card) 26'; Belaïd (yellow card) 71'; M. Ivanov (yellow card) 80'	Report	Silva 22'; Buș 45+4'; Galchev 85'; Marquinhos (yellow card) 3'; Diviš (yellow card) 44'; Galchev (yellow card) 66'	Stadium: Vasil Levski; Attendance: 8,900; Referee: Ivaylo Stoyanov (Petrich)

1 November 2014 14	CSKA	0–0	Slavia	Sofia
17:30	Vasilev (yellow card) 73'; Galchev (yellow card) 86'; Silva (yellow card) 90+5'	Report	Valchanov (yellow card) 19'; Silva (yellow card) 43'; Ristevski (yellow card) 46'; Petrov (yellow card) 85'; Pirgov (yellow card) 90+4'	Stadium: Balgarska Armiya; Attendance: 1,810; Referee: Stanislav Stavrov (Veliko Tarnovo)

9 November 2014 15	Haskovo	2–4	CSKA	Haskovo
13:00	Eugénio 73'; Lozev 80'; Tawiah (red card) 33'	Report	Karachanakov 15'; Buș 21', 57'; Platini 49'	Stadium: Gradski; Attendance: 2,380; Referee: Tasko Taskov (Sofia)

22 November 2014 16	CSKA	1–1	Ludogorets	Sofia
16:00	Tunchev 25'; Silva (yellow card) 36'; Marquinhos (red card) 41'; Platini (yellow card) 61'; Popov (yellow card) 90+3'	Report	Espinho 37'; Misidjan (red card) 14'; Caiçara (yellow card) 29'; Moți (yellow card) 34'; Espinho (yellow card) 59'; Anicet (yellow card) 63'; Minev (yellow card) 84'	Stadium: Balgarska Armiya; Attendance: 13,900; Referee: Tasko Taskov (Sofia)

30 November 2014 17	Marek	0–0	CSKA	Dupnitsa
13:15	Bibishkov (yellow card) 26'; Bliznakov (yellow card) 30'; Lahchev (yellow card) 72'	Report	Felipe (penalty missed) 75'; Vasilev (yellow card) 40'; Oršulić (yellow card) 49'	Stadium: Bonchuk; Attendance: 1,080; Referee: Aleksandar Kostadinov (Sofia)

6 December 2014 18	CSKA	2–0	Lokomotiv Plovdiv	Sofia
16:00	Oršulić 58'; Joachim 85'; Oršulić (yellow card) 18'	Report	Oladele (yellow card) 9'; Dyakov (yellow card) 25'; Granchov (yellow card) 26'; Karageren (yellow card) 79'	Stadium: Balgarska Armiya; Attendance: 1,860; Referee: Vihren Manev (Sofia)

13 December 2014 19	CSKA	3–1	Cherno More	Sofia
16:00	Oršulić 5'; Joachim 64', 68'; Milisavljević (yellow card) 78'	Report	Sténio 14'; Bozhilov (yellow card) 25'; Palankov (yellow card) 29'; Venkov (yellow card) 52'; Sténio (yellow card) 66'	Stadium: Balgarska Armiya; Attendance: 1,710; Referee: Nikola Popov (Sofia)

1 March 2015 20	Lokomotiv Sofia	2–0	CSKA	Sofia
15:30	Yordanov 53'; Romanov 82'; Tom (yellow card) 32'; Mitrev (yellow card) 34'; Yordanov (yellow card) 41'; Branekov (yellow card) 46'; Trifonov (yellow card) 65'	Report	Platini (red card) 40'; Kukoč (yellow card) 41'; Diviš (yellow card) 46'; Popov (yellow card) 50' (yellow-red card) 79'; Vasilev (yellow card) 57'; Milisavljević (yellow card) 61'	Stadium: Lokomotiv; Attendance: 5,750; Referee: Georgi Kabakov (Plovdiv)

7 March 2015 21	CSKA	0–1	Beroe	Sofia
17:00	Nikolić (penalty missed) 85'; Sunny (yellow card) 80'; Marquinhos (yellow card) 90'	Report	N'Diaye 74'; Elias (yellow card) 70'; Djoman (yellow card) 80'	Stadium: Balgarska Armiya; Attendance: 1,830; Referee: Tasko Taskov (Sofia)

15 March 2015 22	Botev	2–0	CSKA	Plovdiv
15:30	Gamakov 18'; Baltanov 39'; Gamakov (yellow card) 15'; Filipov (yellow card) 73'	Report	Nikolić (yellow card) 11'; Prychynenko (yellow card) 17'; Marquinhos (yellow card) 53'; Vasilev (yellow card) 70'; Oršulić (yellow card) 81'	Stadium: Botev 1912 Football Complex; Attendance: 3,450; Referee: Nikola Popov (Sofia)

==== Championship round ====
===== Table =====
Pos	Team	Pld	W	D	L	GF	GA	GD	Pts	Qualification or relegation
1	Ludogorets Razgrad (C)	32	18	9	5	63	24	+39	63	Qualification for Champions League second qualifying round
2	Beroe	32	15	10	7	46	30	+16	55 (Note: Beroe ahead of Lokomotiv Sofia on head-to-head points; Beroe: 7 pts, Lokomotiv Sofia: 4 pts.)	Qualification for Europa League first qualifying round
3	Lokomotiv Sofia (R)	32	16	7	9	39	31	+8	55	Relegation to 2015–16 V Group (Note: Lokomotiv Sofia did not receive a license for European competitions and Litex Lovech took their place.)
4	Litex Lovech	32	16	6	10	49	36	+13	54	Qualification for Europa League first qualifying round
5	CSKA Sofia (D, R)	32	14	10	8	45	27	+18	52	Relegation to 2015–16 V Group
6	Botev Plovdiv	32	12	6	14	38	39	−1	42	

Source: bulgarian-football.com
Rules for classification: 1st points; 2nd head-to-head points; 3rd head-to-head goal difference; 4th head-to-head goals scored; 5th head-to-head away goals scored; 6th season goal difference; 7th season goals scored; 8th "sportsmanship" (R & Y cards); 9th draw
(C) Champions; (D) Disqualified; (R) Relegated

===== Results summary =====
Overall								Home						Away					
Pld	W	D	L	GF	GA	GD	Pts	W	D	L	GF	GA	GD	W	D	L	GF	GA	GD
10	1	5	4	6	12	−6	8	1	3	1	3	2	+1	0	2	3	3	10	−7

Last updated: 31 May 2015.
Source: Soccerway

===== Results by round =====
Round	1	2	3	4	5	6	7	8	9	10
Ground	H	A	H	H	A	A	H	A	A	H
Result	D	L	D	L	L	D	D	L	D	W
Position	2	2	2	3	4	4	4	5	5	5

Source: See Results
A = Away; H = Home; W = Win; D = Draw; L = Loss

===== Fixtures and results =====
21 March 2015 23	CSKA	0–0	Beroe	Sofia
17:00	Galchev (yellow card) 34'; Prychynenko (yellow card) 56'; Vasilev (yellow card) 82'	Report	Mapuku (yellow card) 34'; Djoman (yellow card) 54'; Zafirov (red card) 74'; Dyakov (yellow card) 85'; Penev (red card) 90+3'	Stadium: Balgarska Armiya; Attendance: 3,580; Referee: Tsvetan Krastev (Varna)

4 April 2015 24	Ludogorets	4–0	CSKA	Razgrad
20:00	Barthe 36'; Marcelinho 64'; Misidjan 79'; Quixadá 90+1'; Dyakov (yellow card) 56'	Report	Stoyanov (yellow card) 24'; Nikolić (yellow card) 27'; Tunchev (yellow card) 68'	Stadium: Ludogorets Arena; Attendance: 5,330; Referee: Georgi Yordanov (Gabrovo)

10 April 2015 25	CSKA	0–0	Botev	Sofia
20:00	Felipe (yellow card) 37'; Iliev (yellow card) 39'; Sunny (yellow card) 79'	Report	Zlatkov (yellow card) 34' (yellow-red card) 53'; Tsvetanov (yellow card) 48'	Stadium: Balgarska Armiya; Attendance: 2,160; Referee: Georgi Dimitrov (Sofia)

20 April 2015 26	CSKA	0–1	Lokomotiv Sofia	Sofia
20:00		Report	Romanov 71'; Branekov (yellow card) 56'	Stadium: Balgarska Armiya; Attendance: 1,740; Referee: Vihren Manev (Sofia)

26 April 2015 27	Litex	2–0	CSKA	Lovech
20:00	Moreno 19', 37'; Boumal (yellow card) 11'	Report	Silva (yellow card) 18'; Iliev (yellow card) 41'; Galchev (yellow card) 60'	Stadium: Gradski; Attendance: 3,220; Referee: Stanislav Stavrov (Veliko Tarnovo)

1 May 2015 28	Beroe	0–0	CSKA	Stara Zagora
18:00	Kerkar (yellow card) 53'	Report	Milisavljević (yellow card) 19'	Stadium: Beroe; Attendance: 6,750; Referee: Vladimir Valkov (Plovdiv)

9 May 2015 29	CSKA	0–0	Ludogorets	Sofia
20:00	Sunny (yellow card) 42'	Report	Angulo (yellow card) 59'; Barthe (yellow card) 62' (yellow-red card) 88'; Zlatinski (yellow card) 79'; Moți (yellow card) 88'; Stoyanov (yellow card) 90+8'	Stadium: Balgarska Armiya; Attendance: 7,040; Referee: Nikola Popov (Sofia)

16 May 2015 30	Botev	3–2	CSKA	Plovdiv
17:30	Marin 33'; Baltanov 50'; Tsvetkov 63'; Gamakov (yellow card) 1'; Nikolov (red card) 55'; Zlatkov (yellow card) 55'; Baltanov (yellow card) 78'	Report	Silva 38'; Milisavljević 77'; Sunny (yellow card) 4'; Kukoč (yellow card) 15'; Silva (red card) 55'; Vasilev (yellow card) 72'	Stadium: Botev 1912 Football Complex; Attendance: 2,000; Referee: Tsvetan Krastev (Varna)

23 May 2015 31	Lokomotiv Sofia	1–1	CSKA	Sofia
17:30	Gargorov 78'; Hadzhiev (yellow card) 35'; Trayanov (yellow card) 88'	Report	Marquinhos 89'; Sunny (yellow card) 16'; Supusepa (yellow card) 40'; Prychynenko (yellow card) 43'; Nikolić (yellow card) 58' (yellow-red card) 60'	Stadium: Lokomotiv; Attendance: 1,780; Referee: Georgi Kabakov (Plovdiv)

31 May 2015 32	CSKA	3–1	Litex	Sofia
18:00	Kukoč 34'; Marković 47'; Galchev 75'; Kukoč (yellow card) 32'; Krachunov (yellow card) 41'; Marković (yellow card) 48'	Report	Johnsen 74'; Goranov (yellow card) 39'; Malinov (yellow card) 41'	Stadium: Balgarska Armiya; Attendance: 3,300; Referee: Nikola Popov (Sofia)

=== Bulgarian Cup ===
24 September 2014 First Round	Montana	2–1 (a.e.t.)	CSKA	Montana
15:45	Antonov 80'; S. Georgiev 105'; Pochanski (yellow card) 47'; Rahov (yellow card) 74'; Michev (yellow card) 99'; Vasilev (yellow card) 119'	Report	Silva 73'; Edenilson (yellow card) 14'; Prychynenko (yellow card) 15'; Marquinhos (yellow card) 65'; Platini (yellow card) 120'	Stadium: Ogosta; Attendance: 2,360; Referee: Aleksandar Kostadinov (Sofia)

=== Europa League ===
By ending as runner-up from A Grupa 2013/14, CSKA Sofia qualified for the Europa League. They started in the second qualifying round.

==== Second qualifying round ====
17 July 2014 First leg	CSKA (Bulgaria)	1–1	(Moldova) Zimbru	Sofia, Bulgaria
20:30	Karachanakov 41'	Report	Alexeev 31'; Klimovich (yellow card) 20'; Pavlyuchek (yellow card) 53'; Jardan (yellow card) 60'; Vremea (yellow card) 68'; Erhan (yellow card) 90+3'	Stadium: Vasil Levski; Attendance: 5,000; Referee: Barış Şimşek (Turkey)

24 July 2014 Second leg	Zimbru (Moldova)	0–0 (1–1(a) agg.)	(Bulgaria) CSKA	Chişinău, Moldova
20:00	Vremea (yellow card) 3'; Dedov (yellow card) 8'; Spătaru (yellow card) 86'; Rusu (yellow card) 90+5'	Report	Krachunov (yellow card) 20'; Marquinhos (yellow card) 58'; Edenilson (red card) 86'; Joachim (yellow card) 90+4'	Stadium: Stadionul Zimbru; Attendance: 8,505; Referee: Marco Fritz (Germany)

== See also ==
- PFC CSKA Sofia
