= 2015–16 TFF 1. Lig =

TFF 1. Lig
- Season: 2015–16
- Champions: Adanaspor
- Promoted: Adanaspor; Karabükspor; Alanyaspor (Play-off winner)
- Relegated: 1461 Trabzon; Kayseri Erciyesspor; Karşıyaka
- Matches played: 306
- Goals scored: 747 (2.44 per match)
- All statistics correct as of 21 May 2016.

The 2015–16 TFF 1. Lig (referred to as the PTT 1. Lig for sponsorship reasons) is the 15th season since the league was established in 2001 and 53rd season of the second-level football league of Turkey since its establishment in 1963–64.

== Teams ==
- Balıkesir, Karabükspor and Kayseri Erciyesspor relegated from 2014–15 Süper Lig.
- Kayserispor, Osmanlıspor and Antalyaspor promoted to 2015–16 Süper Lig.
- Göztepe, Yeni Malatyaspor and 1461 Trabzon promoted from 2014–15 TFF Second League.
- Manisaspor, Bucaspor and Orduspor relegated to 2015–16 TFF Second League.

=== Stadia and locations ===
Location of teams in 1. Lig 2015–16

| Team | Home city | Stadium | Capacity |
|---|---|---|---|
| 1461 Trabzon | Trabzon | Hüseyin Avni Aker Stadium | 24,169 |
| Adana Demirspor | Adana | Adana 5 Ocak Stadium | 14,805 |
| Adanaspor | Adana | Adana 5 Ocak Stadium | 14,805 |
| Alanyaspor | Alanya | Alanya Oba Stadium | 15,000 |
| Altınordu | İzmir | Buca Stadium | 2,500 |
| Balıkesirspor | Balıkesir | Balıkesir Atatürk Stadium | 15,800 |
| Boluspor | Bolu | Bolu Atatürk Stadium | 8,881 |
| Denizlispor | Denizli | Denizli Atatürk Stadium | 15,420 |
| Elazığspor | Elazığ | Elazığ Atatürk Stadium | 13,923 |
| Gaziantep BB | Gaziantep | Kamil Ocak Stadium | 16,981 |
| Giresunspor | Giresun | Giresun Atatürk Stadium | 12,191 |
| Göztepe | İzmir | İzmir Atatürk Stadium | 51,295 |
| Karabükspor | Karabük | Dr. Necmettin Şeyhoğlu Stadium | 14,200 |
| Karşıyaka | İzmir | İzmir Alsancak Stadium | 15,358 |
| Kayseri Erciyesspor | Kayseri | Kadir Has Stadium | 32,864 |
| Samsunspor | Samsun | Samsun 19 Mayıs Stadium | 16,480 |
| Şanlıurfaspor | Şanlıurfa | Şanlıurfa GAP Stadium | 28,965 |
| Yeni Malatyaspor | Malatya | Malatya İnönü Stadium | 13,000 |

=== Foreign players ===
| Club | Player 1 | Player 2 | Player 3 | Player 4 | Player 5 | Player 6 | Player 7 | Former Players |
|---|---|---|---|---|---|---|---|---|
| 1461 Trabzon | (France) Franck Mbarga | (Haiti) Kervens Belfort | (Martinique) Yoann Arquin | (Togo) Serge Nyuiadzi | | | | (Argentina) Juan Vieyra (Togo) Serge Akakpo (Ukraine) Dmytro Yarchuk |
| Adana Demirspor | (Benin) Mickaël Poté | (Brazil) Reiner Ferreira | (Brazil) Tiago Bezerra | (Ghana) Joseph Attamah | (Guinea-Bissau) Formose Mendy | (Togo) Ibrahim Moro | | (North Macedonia) Daniel Mojsov (Romania) Victoraș Astafei |
| Adanaspor | (Brazil) Didi | (Brazil) Renan Foguinho | (France) Magaye Gueye | (Nigeria) Nduka Ozokwo | (Nigeria) Uche Kalu | | | (Brazil) Roni |
| Alanyaspor | (Burkina Faso) Bakary Soro | (Ghana) Nuru Sulley | (Lithuania) Darvydas Šernas | (Serbia) Slavko Perović | (Togo) Jonathan Ayité | | | (Nigeria) Sunny |
| Altınordu | | | | | | | | |
| Balıkesirspor | (Croatia) Ante Erceg | (Croatia) Andrija Vuković | (Croatia) Josip Tadić | (Croatia) Tomislav Glumac | (Netherlands) Género Zeefuik | (Sierra Leone) Alfred Sankoh | | (Ghana) Kwame Karikari |
| Boluspor | (Brazil) Luiz Henrique | (Colombia) Sebastián Hernández | (Netherlands) Alvin Fortes | (Netherlands) Anco Jansen | (North Macedonia) Mirko Ivanovski | | | (Cameroon) Henri Belle (Canada) Tosaint Ricketts (Czech Republic) Petr Janda (Nigeria) Edward Ofere |
| Denizlispor | (Brazil) Leandrinho | (Bulgaria) Daniel Dimov | (Bulgaria) Tsvetan Genkov | | | | | (Brazil) Leozinho (Iraq) Anmar Almubaraki |
| Elazığspor | (Brazil) Tom | (Cameroon) Gilles Binya | (Mali) Hamidou Traoré | (Republic of the Congo) Silvère Ganvoula | (Togo) Prince Segbefia | (Tunisia) Lamjed Chehoudi | | (Brazil) Cleyton |
| Gaziantep | (Austria) Benjamin Fuchs | (Central African Republic) Foxi Kéthévoama | (Senegal) Ibrahima Wadji | (Poland) Adam Stachowiak | (Republic of the Congo) Francis Litsingi | (Serbia) Nemanja Kojić | (Serbia) Nikola Raspopović | (Brazil) Alanzinho (Senegal) Bara Bebeto |
| Giresunspor | (Brazil) Bruno Alves | (Brazil) Dodô | (Brazil) Waldison | (Cameroon) Hervé Tchami | (Nigeria) David Abwo | | | (France) Mohamadou Sissoko (Ghana) Abdul-Basit Adam |
| Göztepe | (Belgium) Björn Vleminckx | (Brazil) Cleyton | (France) Robert Maah | (Netherlands) Leroy George | (Ivory Coast) Jean-Jacques Gosso | (Senegal) Lamine Diarra | | (Austria) Benjamin Fuchs |
| Karabükspor | (Brazil) Adriano | (Croatia) Elvis Kokalović | (Democratic Republic of the Congo) Junior Kabananga | (Nigeria) Isaac Promise | (Nigeria) Simon Zenke | (Romania) Marius Alexe | | (Romania) Gabriel Iancu (Romania) Ionuț Neagu |
| Karşıyaka | (Bosnia and Herzegovina) Josip Kvesić | (Ivory Coast) Abdel Diarra | (Liberia) Tonia Tisdell | (Ukraine) Kyrylo Kovalchuk | | | | (Azerbaijan) Kamran Agayev (Bosnia and Herzegovina) Senijad Ibričić (Georgia (country)) Aleksandre Amisulashvili (Senegal) Djiby Fall (Serbia) Igor Đurić |
| Kayseri Erciyesspor | (Bosnia and Herzegovina) Eldin Adilović | (Greece) Georgios Sarris | (Nigeria) Ayodeji Ibrahim | (Nigeria) Iyayi Atiemwen | (Nigeria) Saturday Erimuya | (North Macedonia) Stefan Ashkovski | | |
| Samsunspor | (Bulgaria) Galin Ivanov | (Democratic Republic of the Congo) Distel Zola | (Mali) Famoussa Koné | (Nigeria) Chikeluba Ofoedu | (Nigeria) Ekigho Ehiosun | (Senegal) Ousmane N'Diaye | | |
| Şanlıurfaspor | (Democratic Republic of the Congo) Lomana LuaLua | (Ethiopia) Amin Askar | (Netherlands) Ricky van Haaren | (Portugal) Diogo Valente | (Portugal) Edinho | (Senegal) Makhtar Thioune | | (Brazil) Fernando Silva (Guinea-Bissau) Cícero (Guinea-Bissau) Toni Silva (Italy) Doudou Mangni (Ivory Coast) Magique |
| Yeni Malatyaspor | (Nigeria) Azubuike Okechukwu | (Nigeria) George Akpabio | (Nigeria) Izu Azuka | (Nigeria) Sunday Mba | (Uruguay) Gonzalo Godoy | | | (Austria) Sandro Gotal (Brazil) Alex |

== League table ==
| Pos | Team | Pld | W | D | L | GF | GA | GD | Pts | Qualification or relegation |
|---|---|---|---|---|---|---|---|---|---|---|
| 1 | Adanaspor (C, P) | 34 | 20 | 5 | 9 | 53 | 36 | +17 | 65 | Promotion to Süper Lig |
| 2 | Karabükspor (P) | 34 | 17 | 11 | 6 | 41 | 27 | +14 | 62 | Promotion to Süper Lig |
| 3 | Alanyaspor (O, P) | 34 | 17 | 10 | 7 | 60 | 38 | +22 | 61 | Qualification for the Süper Lig Playoffs |
| 4 | Adana Demirspor | 34 | 15 | 9 | 10 | 53 | 40 | +13 | 54 | Qualification for the Süper Lig Playoffs |
| 5 | Elazığspor | 34 | 13 | 13 | 8 | 45 | 38 | +7 | 52 | Qualification for the Süper Lig Playoffs |
| 6 | Balıkesirspor | 34 | 13 | 13 | 8 | 40 | 29 | +11 | 52 | Qualification for the Süper Lig Playoffs |
| 7 | Giresunspor | 34 | 14 | 9 | 11 | 49 | 40 | +9 | 51 | |
| 8 | Gaziantep B.B. | 34 | 11 | 15 | 8 | 38 | 33 | +5 | 48 | |
| 9 | Samsunspor (Note: Samsunspor were deducted 3 points) | 34 | 13 | 8 | 13 | 45 | 39 | +6 | 44 | |
| 10 | Altınordu | 34 | 11 | 11 | 12 | 39 | 43 | −4 | 44 | |
| 11 | Yeni Malatyaspor | 34 | 12 | 7 | 15 | 35 | 41 | −6 | 43 | |
| 12 | Boluspor | 34 | 10 | 12 | 12 | 36 | 46 | −10 | 42 | |
| 13 | Göztepe | 34 | 9 | 11 | 14 | 38 | 40 | −2 | 38 | |
| 14 | Şanlıurfaspor | 34 | 10 | 8 | 16 | 34 | 45 | −11 | 38 | |
| 15 | Denizlispor (Note: Denizlispor were deducted 3 points) | 34 | 10 | 9 | 15 | 41 | 52 | −11 | 36 | |
| 16 | 1461 Trabzon (R) | 34 | 9 | 7 | 18 | 32 | 53 | −21 | 34 | Relegation to the TFF Second League |
| 17 | Kayseri Erciyesspor (R) | 34 | 8 | 9 | 17 | 35 | 54 | −19 | 33 | Relegation to the TFF Second League |
| 18 | Karşıyaka (R) | 34 | 6 | 9 | 19 | 33 | 53 | −20 | 27 | Relegation to the TFF Second League |

Source: TFF 1. Lig
Rules for classification: 1) Points; 2) Head-to-head points; 3) Head-to-head goal difference; 4) Head-to-head goals scored; 5) Goal difference; 6) Goals scored
(C) Champions; (O) Play-off winners; (P) Promoted; (R) Relegated

== Results ==
| Home \ Away | TRA | ADA | ADS | ALA | ATN | BAL | BOL | DEN | ELZ | GBB | GRS | GÖZ | KRB | KRŞ | KEC | SAM | ŞUR | YML |
|---|---|---|---|---|---|---|---|---|---|---|---|---|---|---|---|---|---|---|
| 1461 Trabzon | | 1–2 | 1–4 | 1–2 | 1–3 | 0–0 | 0–0 | 0–3 | 3–1 | 1–2 | 1–1 | 2–0 | 1–1 | 2–1 | 0–0 | 1–2 | 1–0 | 2–1 |
| Adanaspor | 4–0 | | 1–0 | 0–2 | 2–4 | 1–0 | 1–2 | 2–1 | 0–1 | 1–0 | 1–0 | 0–2 | 3–0 | 1–0 | 3–1 | 2–1 | 3–2 | 2–0 |
| Adana Demirspor | 3–1 | 2–0 | | 1–1 | 5–2 | 2–2 | 1–0 | 0–2 | 2–1 | 1–2 | 2–3 | 2–1 | 1–3 | 2–0 | 1–2 | 1–0 | 2–0 | 1–1 |
| Alanyaspor | 2–1 | 1–2 | 2–2 | | 2–0 | 1–1 | 1–0 | 6–0 | 1–1 | 2–0 | 2–0 | 2–1 | 1–1 | 2–2 | 2–1 | 3–2 | 4–0 | 2–0 |
| Altınordu A.Ş. | 0–1 | 1–2 | 0–0 | 3–1 | | 0–0 | 0–2 | 2–0 | 1–0 | 0–0 | 1–2 | 1–0 | 0–0 | 3–1 | 4–2 | 0–4 | 0–0 | 0–1 |
| Balıkesirspor | 2–1 | 3–3 | 1–2 | 1–0 | 0–0 | | 6–0 | 2–1 | 1–1 | 0–0 | 1–1 | 1–1 | 2–0 | 0–0 | 3–0 | 1–0 | 1–0 | 1–0 |
| Boluspor | 1–0 | 1–2 | 1–0 | 0–2 | 1–1 | 1–2 | | 3–1 | 0–0 | 1–1 | 2–1 | 1–2 | 0–1 | 1–1 | 1–1 | 0–2 | 4–2 | 3–1 |
| Denizlispor | 4–1 | 0–2 | 1–1 | 2–0 | 2–2 | 1–1 | 3–1 | | 0–4 | 2–5 | 2–0 | 1–2 | 1–1 | 0–0 | 0–2 | 0–0 | 0–2 | 2–0 |
| Elazığspor | 2–0 | 1–1 | 1–0 | 1–0 | 3–2 | 2–1 | 0–0 | 3–1 | | 1–1 | 1–1 | 1–1 | 2–1 | 2–0 | 2–0 | 1–2 | 2–1 | 0–3 |
| Gaziantep B.B. | 2–1 | 2–3 | 0–2 | 2–3 | 1–1 | 1–2 | 2–2 | 2–2 | 2–0 | | 0–0 | 0–0 | 1–1 | 1–0 | 2–0 | 2–1 | 1–1 | 0–0 |
| Giresunspor | 1–0 | 1–0 | 1–0 | 2–2 | 1–0 | 2–1 | 5–1 | 2–2 | 2–2 | 0–0 | | 3–1 | 2–3 | 3–1 | 3–3 | 2–0 | 3–1 | 1–2 |
| Göztepe A.Ş. | 1–0 | 0–0 | 1–3 | 1–1 | 2–2 | 1–1 | 0–0 | 0–1 | 2–2 | 1–2 | 0–1 | | 1–2 | 2–0 | 2–0 | 2–0 | 1–1 | 3–1 |
| Kardemir Karabükspor | 1–2 | 2–1 | 0–0 | 1–1 | 0–0 | 3–0 | 0–1 | 1–0 | 2–2 | 1–0 | 1–0 | 3–2 | | 2–1 | 1–0 | 1–0 | 1–0 | 0–0 |
| Karşıyaka | 2–3 | 2–3 | 1–2 | 2–2 | 0–1 | 1–0 | 1–1 | 1–3 | 2–0 | 1–1 | 2–1 | 1–0 | 0–2 | | 1–3 | 2–2 | 1–0 | 0–1 |
| Kayseri Erciyesspor | 1–1 | 0–3 | 2–2 | 0–3 | 4–1 | 0–1 | 0–0 | 0–0 | 1–1 | 1–2 | 2–1 | 1–0 | 0–3 | 2–1 | | 3–0 | 1–3 | 0–2 |
| Samsunspor | 3–0 | 2–1 | 3–3 | 5–1 | 1–2 | 0–2 | 3–0 | 2–1 | 2–1 | 0–0 | 0–2 | 2–1 | 0–0 | 1–2 | 0–0 | | 2–0 | 0–0 |
| Şanlıurfaspor | 1–1 | 0–0 | 2–0 | 0–2 | 2–1 | 2–0 | 2–2 | 1–0 | 1–1 | 1–0 | 1–0 | 1–1 | 1–2 | 1–0 | 2–1 | 2–3 | | 0–2 |
| Yeni Malatyaspor | 0–1 | 1–1 | 1–3 | 2–1 | 0–1 | 1–0 | 1–3 | 1–2 | 1–2 | 0–1 | 2–1 | 1–3 | 1–0 | 3–3 | 3–1 | 0–0 | 2–1 | |

Legend: Blue = home team win; Yellow = draw; Red = away team win.

== Promotion playoffs ==
=== Semifinals ===
| Team 1 | Agg. | Team 2 | 1st leg | 2nd leg |
|---|---|---|---|---|
| Balıkesirspor | 0–1 | Alanyaspor | 0–0 | 0–1 |
| Elazığspor | 4–4 | Adana Demirspor | 3–2 | 1–2 |

=== Final ===
| Team 1 | Score | Team 2 |
|---|---|---|
| Alanyaspor | 1–1 (4-2 pen.) | Adana Demirspor |

== Attendance ==
| Pos | Team | Total | High | Low | Average | Change |
|---|---|---|---|---|---|---|
| 1 | Adana Demirspor | 108,313 | 12,000 | 2,220 | 6,371 | +0.6% |
| 2 | Samsunspor | 79,000 | 8,000 | 0 | 4,647 | +1.3%^{3} |
| 3 | Adanaspor | 76,317 | 13,367 | 150 | 4,489 | +48.1% |
| 4 | Göztepe A.Ş. | 64,902 | 13,590 | 331 | 3,818 | n/a^{2} |
| 5 | Elazığspor | 63,733 | 9,000 | 0 | 3,541 | +112.9%^{3} |
| 6 | Şanlıurfaspor | 58,449 | 15,000 | 1,000 | 3,438 | −23.1% |
| 7 | Giresunspor | 54,546 | 8,000 | 1,000 | 3,209 | +13.8% |
| 8 | Balıkesirspor | 56,513 | 6,550 | 500 | 3,140 | −41.1%^{1} |
| 9 | Yeni Malatyaspor | 45,162 | 6,000 | 0 | 2,657 | n/a^{2,3} |
| 10 | Karşıyaka | 42,492 | 20,000 | 50 | 2,500 | +50.0% |
| 11 | Alanyaspor | 37,888 | 7,300 | 450 | 2,229 | +27.4% |
| 12 | Kardemir Karabükspor | 37,837 | 5,000 | 0 | 2,226 | −40.3%^{1} |
| 13 | Boluspor | 34,250 | 4,000 | 250 | 2,015 | −6.8% |
| 14 | Denizlispor | 29,967 | 5,000 | 500 | 1,763 | +5.5% |
| 15 | Gaziantep BB | 16,381 | 3,500 | 150 | 964 | +43.9% |
| 16 | Altınordu A.Ş. | 15,091 | 3,000 | 231 | 888 | −16.7% |
| 17 | 1461 Trabzon | 8,037 | 2,000 | 30 | 473 | n/a^{2} |
| 18 | Kayseri Erciyesspor | 7,161 | 1,000 | 250 | 421 | −85.3%^{1} |
| | League total | 836,039 | 20,000 | 0 | 2,714 | +7.0% |

Updated to games played on 20 May 2016
Notes:
1: Team played last season in Spor Toto Süper League
2: Team played last season in TFF Second League
3: Yeni Malatyaspor - 1461 Trabzon, Elazığspor - Altınordu, Samsunspor - Elazığspor and Karabükspor - Adanaspor games were played behind closed gates

== See also ==
- 2015–16 Turkish Cup
- 2015–16 Süper Lig
- 2015–16 TFF Second League
- 2015–16 TFF Third League
