= Jakub Diviš =

Czech footballer

Personal information
- Full name: Jakub Diviš
- Date of birth: 27 July 1986 (age 40)
- Place of birth: Turnov, Czechoslovakia
- Height: 1.95 m (6 ft 5 in)
- Position: Goalkeeper

Youth career
- FC Lomnice nad Popelkou
- 2004–2006: Slavia Prague

Senior career*
Years	Team	Apps	(Gls)
2006–2009	Slavia Prague	0	(0)
2006	→ Slavoj Vyšehrad (loan)	3	(0)
2008	→ Sparta Krč (loan)	15	(1)
2009	→ Tatran Prešov (loan)	19	(0)
2010–2013	Tatran Prešov	88	(0)
2011	→ Hibernian (loan)	3	(0)
2013–2017	Mladá Boleslav	39	(0)
2014–2015	→ CSKA Sofia (loan)	24	(0)
2017–2020	Teplice	36	(0)
2021	Mladá Boleslav	7	(0)
2022–2023	SK Benešov	11	(0)

International career
2004	Czech Republic U-19	1	(0)
2007–2008	Czech Republic U-21	3	(0)
- * Club domestic league appearances and goals as of 7 January 2023

Jakub Diviš (born 27 July 1986 in Turnov) is a Czech footballer who plays as a goalkeeper for SK Benešov.

He has previously played for Slavia Prague, Slavoj Vyšehrad, Sparta Krč, Tatran Prešov, Scottish club Hibernian and Mladá Boleslav.

== Career ==
=== Early career ===
Diviš began his senior career with Slavia Prague. He played his first full game in a UEFA Cup match against AFC Ajax on 17 December 2008. He played from January to June 2008 on loan at Sparta Krč, where he scored a last-minute goal in a league match against Ústí nad Labem, which finished 2–2.

=== Tatran Prešov ===
In June 2009, Diviš was loaned out to Slovak side Tatran Prešov. At Tatran he quickly became a first-choice goalkeeper and in early 2010 signed a permanent deal with the club.

==== Hibernian (loan) ====
In January 2011, Diviš was loaned to Scottish club Hibernian on a 12-month deal, making his debut in a 2–1 defeat against St Johnstone on 30 April 2011. Diviš returned to Tatran Presov in June 2011 after Hibs declined an option to extend his loan.

=== CSKA Sofia ===
On 12 July 2014, Diviš signed with CSKA Sofia on a two-year deal. He made his competitive debut five days later, in a 1–1 home draw against Zimbru Chișinău in the second qualifying round of the 2014–15 Europa League. In the first two league games of the 2014–15 season he recorded two clean sheets against Litex Lovech (1–0) and Levski Sofia (2–0). Diviš conceded his first goals for CSKA in the Bulgarian A Group in a 2–2 draw with Slavia Sofia on 3 August. He remained the first choice goalkeeper until the resignation of Stoycho Mladenov in late March 2015, being soon after that relegated to the bench by Maksims Uvarenko and Anatoli Gospodinov.

== International ==
Diviš played three times for the Czech Republic national under-21 football team, including one against Scotland U21 at the Falkirk Stadium.
