= Toni Silva =

Bissau-Guinean footballer

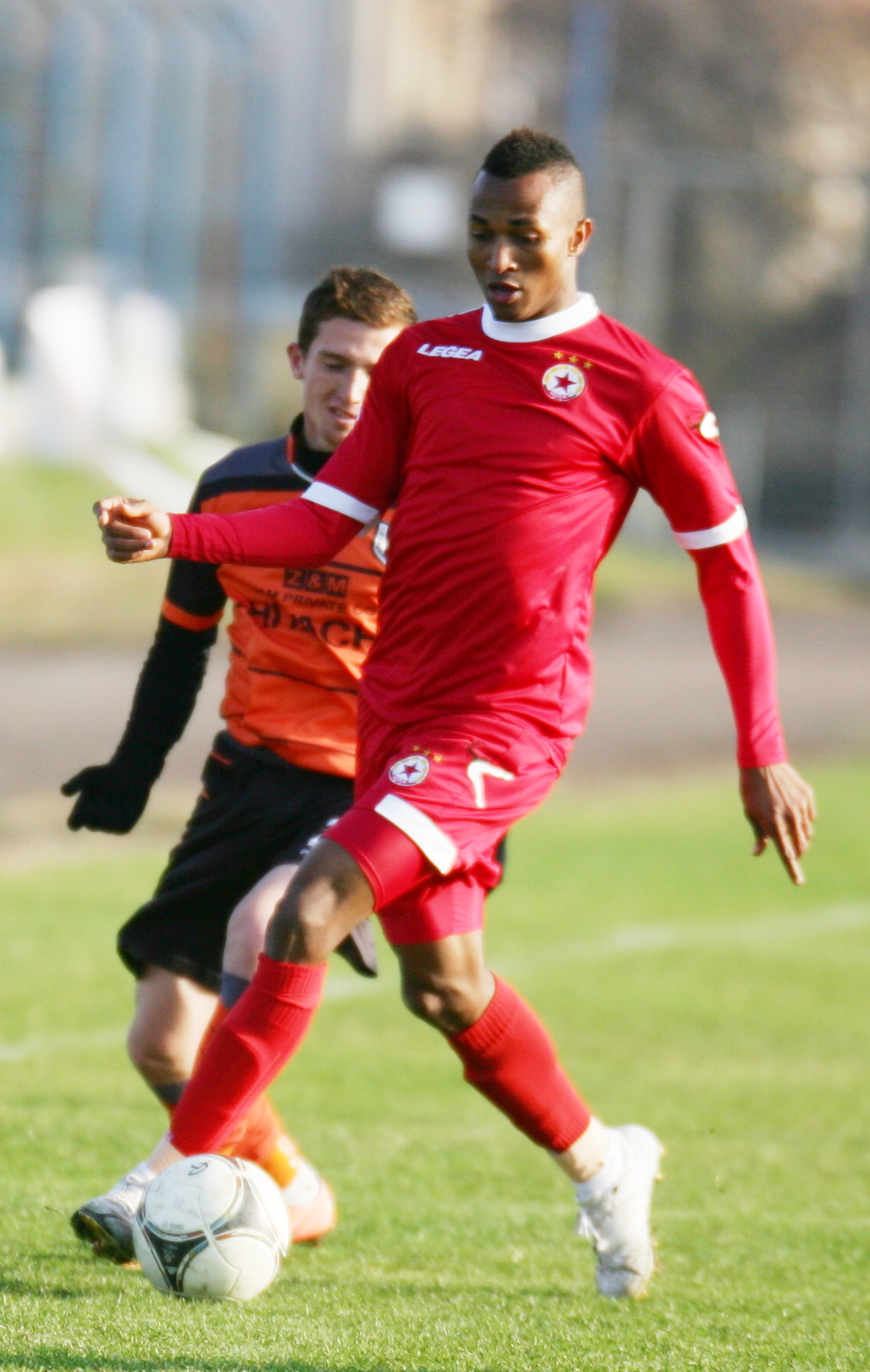
- Silva in action for CSKA Sofia in 2013

Personal information
- Full name: Toni Brito Silva Sá
- Date of birth: 15 September 1993 (age 33)
- Place of birth: Bissau, Guinea-Bissau
- Height: 1.82 m (6 ft 0 in)
- Position: Winger

Team information
- Current team: Żabbar St. Patrick
- Number: 32

Youth career
- 2006–2007: Real Massamá
- 2007–2009: Benfica
- 2009: Chelsea
- 2009–2011: Liverpool

Senior career*
Years	Team	Apps	(Gls)
2011–2012	Liverpool	0	(0)
2012	→ Northampton Town (loan)	14	(1)
2012–2013	Barnsley	1	(0)
2013	→ Dagenham & Redbridge (loan)	4	(0)
2013–2015	CSKA Sofia	42	(8)
2015–2016	Şanlıurfaspor	7	(2)
2016	União Madeira	14	(3)
2016–2018	Levadiakos	31	(6)
2018	Mamelodi Sundowns	7	(1)
2019	Al Ittihad	7	(0)
2019	Astra Giurgiu	1	(0)
2020	Taraz	17	(4)
2021	Tobol	24	(1)
2022	Turan	9	(0)
2022–2023	Aksu	26	(8)
2023–2025	Kazma	0	(0)
2025–	Żabbar St. Patrick	7	(1)

International career
2009–2010	Portugal U17	5	(0)
2010	Portugal U18	2	(0)
2016–2024	Guinea-Bissau	22	(3)
- * Club domestic league appearances and goals as of 6 October 2025

Toni Brito Silva Sá (born 15 September 1993) is a Bissau-Guinean professional footballer who plays as a winger for Żabbar St. Patrick in the Maltese Premier League.

== Club career ==
=== Early years ===
Silva kicked off his career with the youth academy of Real Sport Clube in 2007, and joined Benfica's junior team a season later. He made 7 appearances for the junior team before having a short stint with Chelsea reserves between 2008 and 2009. Then he joined Liverpool still with the reserves before getting a professional contract in 2011.

==== Northampton Town (loan) ====
Silva joined Northampton Town on a one-month youth loan on 14 February 2012 making his debut the same day against AFC Wimbledon. Only a few hours into his time with Northampton he came on as a 74th-minute substitute for Adebayo Akinfenwa. Dribbling past three Wimbledon players his shot was parried and followed in by Luke Guttridge for the winning goal in a 1–0 win. Northampton manager Aidy Boothroyd after the match said; "We don't want to get excited too soon, but he's got Premier League quality", and added "He's dribbled past two or three people and he has got a great goalscoring record". On 22 February 2012, his loan with Northampton was extended until the end of the 2011–12 season.

On 13 March, he scored his first senior goal when he scored the only goal as his loan club won away at Dagenham & Redbridge. At the end of his loan spell he had played 15 times.

=== Barnsley ===
On 23 July 2012, Barnsley signed Silva from Liverpool on a free transfer on a two-year deal. After his move, Silva was given number 20 shirt. Manager Keith Hill comment on Silva saying; "He's left-footed and likes playing on the right," and added "He's quick with and without the ball, he's young and enthusiastic. There's a lot of development we've got to put into this player to make him into a £3 million player and I believe we will be able to do that." Ahead of the start of the season, Silva suffered an injury on his hamstring during a friendly match against Doncaster Rovers and would be out of action for three months. After four-month lay-off, Silva finally made his debut, coming on as a 71st-minute substitute for Matt Done, in a 0–1 loss at Hull City. Since then, Silva was barely used in the first team. However, on 25 January 2013, the Barnsley Chronicle published an article saying he was still in David Flitcroft's plans but is currently working hard in the under-21s to try and force his way into the team by improving his game when he is not in possession.

On 27 March 2013, he was loaned to Dagenham & Redbridge until 23 April. He played four League Two matches for the East London side, and in June, he was released from Barnsley.

=== CSKA Sofia ===
On 17 December 2013, Silva signed a six-month contract with Bulgarian side CSKA Sofia, after a successful one-month trial period with the club. He marked with a goal his league début on 24 February 2014 against Chernomorets Burgas at Lazur Stadium in a 2–1 win; he came on as a substitute and scored the opening goal in the 72nd minute. A week later, Silva scored his second goal in a 3–0 home win over Slavia Sofia. After the fantastic start with the club, on 7 March 2014 his contract with CSKA was extended till June 2017. Silva finished the 2013–14 season with three goals in 15 games.

Silva netted his first goal of the 2014–15 season against Haskovo at Balgarska Armia in a 4–0 win on 10 August 2014. On 25 October he scored his fourth goal in the campaign, opening the scoring in the Eternal derby against Levski Sofia, which CSKA won 3–0. After the winter break Silva and the rest of his CSKA Sofia teammates experienced a significant drop in form, with the team unable to score a goal for 10 consecutive matches. This negative streak was ended after Silva netted an equalizing goal in the 2–3 loss against Botev Plovdiv on 16 May 2015, during the second half of which he also received a red card after an altercation with Daniel Zlatkov and Plamen Nikolov. In April 2015, due to the ultras' disappointment with the team's performances and the lack of goals provided by Silva, the player was subjected to what was perceived to be racist chanting by a small number of the CSKA Sofia supporters.

=== Şanlıurfaspor and return to Portugal ===
After a short stint with Turkish team Şanlıurfaspor, Silva signed a 2 1/2-year contract (with the option for an additional year) with LigaPro club União Madeira.

=== Levadiakos ===
On 9 September 2016, has signed with Greek Super League club Levadiakos for an undisclosed fee.

=== Mamelodi Sundowns ===
In 2018 Silva had a six-month spell with South African club Mamelodi Sundowns.

=== Al Ittihad ===
In January 2019, he joined Egyptian club Al Ittihad on a 2 1/2-year deal.

=== Astra Giurgiu ===
On 30 July 2019, Toni Silva signed a two-year contract with Romanian side Astra Giurgiu.

=== Taraz ===
On 17 February 2020, FC Taraz announced the signing of Silva.

=== Tobol ===
On 18 February 2021, FC Tobol announced the signing of Silva. He helped the club to win the 2021 Kazakhstan Premier League and the 2021 Kazakhstan Super Cup - their first Super Cup triumph.

=== Turan ===
On 14 March 2022, Turan announced the signing of Silva.

== International career ==
Silva was born in Guinea-Bissau, but moved to Portugal as a child. He played for the Portugal U17s, and Portugal U18s. He ended up switching to the Guinea Bissau and made his debut on 4 June 2016, in a 2017 Africa Cup of Nations qualification victory over Zambia, wherein he scored his debut goal for the team.

== Career statistics ==
=== Club ===
As of match played 5 November 2017

Appearances and goals by club, season and competition
Club	Season	League			National cup		League cup		Continental		Total	
Club	Season	Division	Apps	Goals	Apps	Goals	Apps	Goals	Apps	Goals	Apps	Goals
Liverpool	2010–11	Premier League	0	0	0	0	0	0	0	0	0	0
Liverpool	2011–12	Premier League	0	0	0	0	0	0	0	0	0	0
Liverpool	Total		0	0	0	0	0	0	0	0	0	0
Northampton Town (loan)	2011–12	League Two	14	1	0	0	0	0	—		14	1
Barnsley	2012–13	Championship	1	0	0	0	0	0	—		1	0
Dagenham & Redbridge (loan)	2012–13	League Two	4	0	0	0	0	0	—		4	0
CSKA Sofia	2013–14	A Football Group	15	3	0	0	—		—		15	3
CSKA Sofia	2014–15	A Football Group	27	5	1	1	—		2	0	30	6
CSKA Sofia	Total		42	8	1	1	0	0	2	0	45	9
Şanlıurfaspor	2015–16	TFF First League	7	2	1	1	0	0	—		8	3
União	2015–16	Primeira Liga	14	3	0	0	0	0	—		14	3
Levadiakos	2016–17	Super League Greece	23	6	2	0	—		—		25	6
Levadiakos	2017–18	Super League Greece	8	0	1	0	—		0	0	9	0
Levadiakos	Total		31	6	3	0	0	0	0	0	34	6
Career total			113	20	5	2	0	0	2	0	120	22

=== International goals ===
Scores and results list Guinea-Bissau's goal tally first.

No.	Date	Venue	Opponent	Score	Result	Competition
1.	4 June 2016	Estádio 24 de Setembro, Bissau, Guinea-Bissau	Zambia	3–2	3–2	2017 Africa Cup of Nations qualification
2.	14 October 2018	Estádio 24 de Setembro, Bissau, Guinea-Bissau	Zambia	2–1	2–1	2019 Africa Cup of Nations qualification

== Honours ==
FC Tobol

- Kazakhstan Premier League: 2021
- Kazakhstan Super Cup: 2021
