= Petar Vitanov (footballer) =

Bulgarian footballer

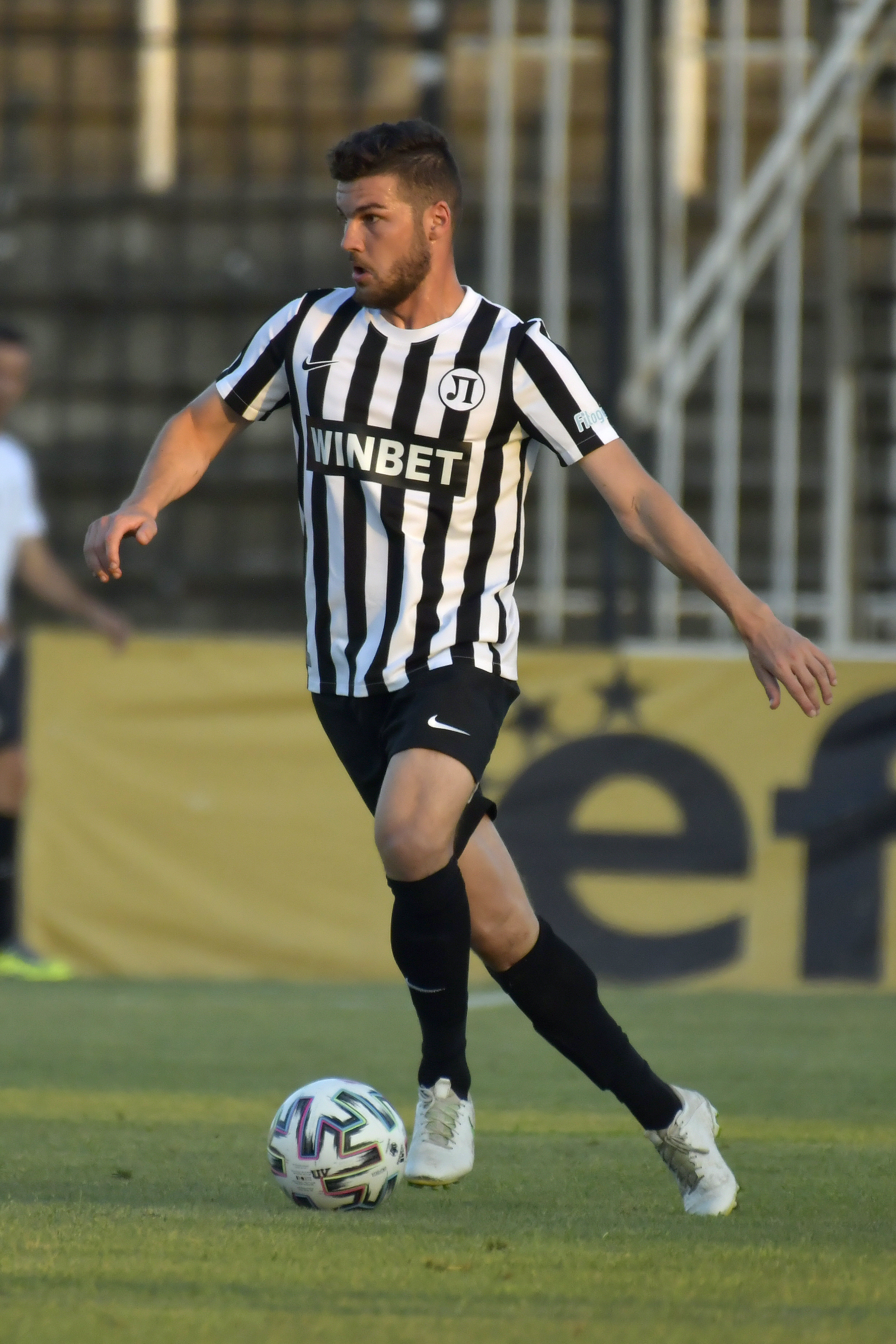
- Vitanov with Lokomotiv Plovdiv in 2019

Personal information
- Full name: Petar Ivo Vitanov
- Date of birth: 10 March 1995 (age 31)
- Place of birth: Sofia, Bulgaria
- Height: 1.83 m (6 ft 0 in)
- Position: Defensive midfielder

Team information
- Current team: CSKA 1948
- Number: 34

Youth career
- 2002–2009: CSKA Sofia
- 2009–2012: Brooke House College
- 2012–2014: CSKA Sofia

Senior career*
Years	Team	Apps	(Gls)
2013–2017	CSKA Sofia	27	(1)
2016–2017	CSKA Sofia II	28	(0)
2017	Vereya	16	(0)
2018–2019	Cherno More	44	(0)
2019–2023	Lokomotiv Plovdiv	100	(0)
2023	Tianjin Jinmen Tiger	12	(0)
2024	Beveren	8	(0)
2024–	CSKA 1948	52	(4)

International career^{‡}
2013–2014	Bulgaria U19	5	(0)
2021–	Bulgaria	8	(0)
- * Club domestic league appearances and goals as of 11 June 2026 ‡ National team caps and goals as of 17:37, 9 October 2021 (UTC)

Petar Ivo Vitanov (Bulgarian: Петър Иво Витанов; born 10 March 1995) is a Bulgarian professional footballer who plays as a midfielder for First League club CSKA 1948 Sofia.

Vitanov began his career with CSKA Sofia. After progressing into the first team, he made his senior debut in December 2013. However, he struggled to establish himself in the first team, making 32 appearances during a four-year spell. He was released by CSKA in 2017 and joined Vereya. In January 2018, Vitanov signed with Cherno More Varna, before moving to Lokomotiv Plovdiv in June 2019.

== Club career ==
Vitanov started his career at home-town club CSKA Sofia, joining their youth system as a seven-year-old. In 2009, after a successful trial he won a scholarship and joined the Football Academy of Brooke House College in England.

In 2012 Vitanov returned to CSKA. On 19 July 2013, he signed his first professional contract with the club, keeping his services at CSKA until 2016. He made his debut on 14 December 2013, coming on as a 46th-minute substitute for Emil Gargorov in a 7–0 home win over Lyubimets 2007.

In June 2017, Vitanov signed with Vereya.

On 12 January 2018, Vitanov signed with Cherno More. On 17 February, he made his official debut for the club in a 1–4 home defeat by Beroe.

On 15 July 2023, Vitanov signed with Chinese Super League club Tianjin Jinmen Tiger.

On 1 February 2024, Vitanov signed with Challenger Pro League club Beveren.

== International career ==
Vitanov made his debut for Bulgaria national football team on 28 March 2021 in a World Cup qualifier against Italy.

== Career statistics ==
As of match played 26 July 2025

Appearances and goals by club, season and competition
Club	Season	League			Cup		Europe		Other		Total	
Club	Season	Division	Apps	Goals	Apps	Goals	Apps	Goals	Apps	Goals	Apps	Goals
CSKA Sofia	2013–14	A Group	1	0	0	0	—		—		1	0
CSKA Sofia	2014–15	A Group	2	0	0	0	—		—		2	0
CSKA Sofia	2015–16	V Group	23	1	5	0	—		—		28	1
CSKA Sofia	2016–17	Bulgarian First League	1	0	0	0	—		—		1	0
CSKA Sofia	Total		27	1	5	0	—		—		32	1
CSKA Sofia II	2016–17	Bulgarian Second League	28	0	—		—		—		28	0
Vereya	2017–18	Bulgarian First League	16	0	0	0	—		—		16	0
Cherno More	2017–18	Bulgarian First League	14	0	0	0	—		—		14	0
Cherno More	2018–19	Bulgarian First League	30	0	2	0	—		—		32	0
Cherno More	Total		44	0	2	0	—		—		46	0
Lokomotiv Plovdiv	2019–20	Bulgarian First League	26	0	5	0	4	0	1	0	36	0
Lokomotiv Plovdiv	2020–21	Bulgarian First League	30	0	3	0	2	0	1	0	36	0
Lokomotiv Plovdiv	2021–22	Bulgarian First League	24	0	2	0	4	1	—		30	1
Lokomotiv Plovdiv	2022–23	Bulgarian First League	20	0	2	1	—		—		22	1
Lokomotiv Plovdiv	Total		100	0	12	1	10	1	2	0	124	2
Tianjin Jinmen Tiger	2023	Chinese Super League	12	0	2	0	—		—		14	0
Beveren	2023–24	Challenger Pro League	8	0	0	0	—		—		8	0
CSKA 1948	2024–25	Bulgarian First League	22	4	2	0	—		—		24	4
CSKA 1948	2025–26	Bulgarian First League	2	0	0	0	—		—		2	0
CSKA 1948	Total		24	4	2	0	—		—		26	4
Career total			259	5	23	1	10	1	2	0	294	7

== Honours ==
CSKA Sofia

- Bulgarian Cup: 2015–16

Lokomotiv Plovdiv

- Bulgarian Cup: 2019–20
- Bulgarian Supercup: 2020
