= Anton Karachanakov =

Bulgarian footballer

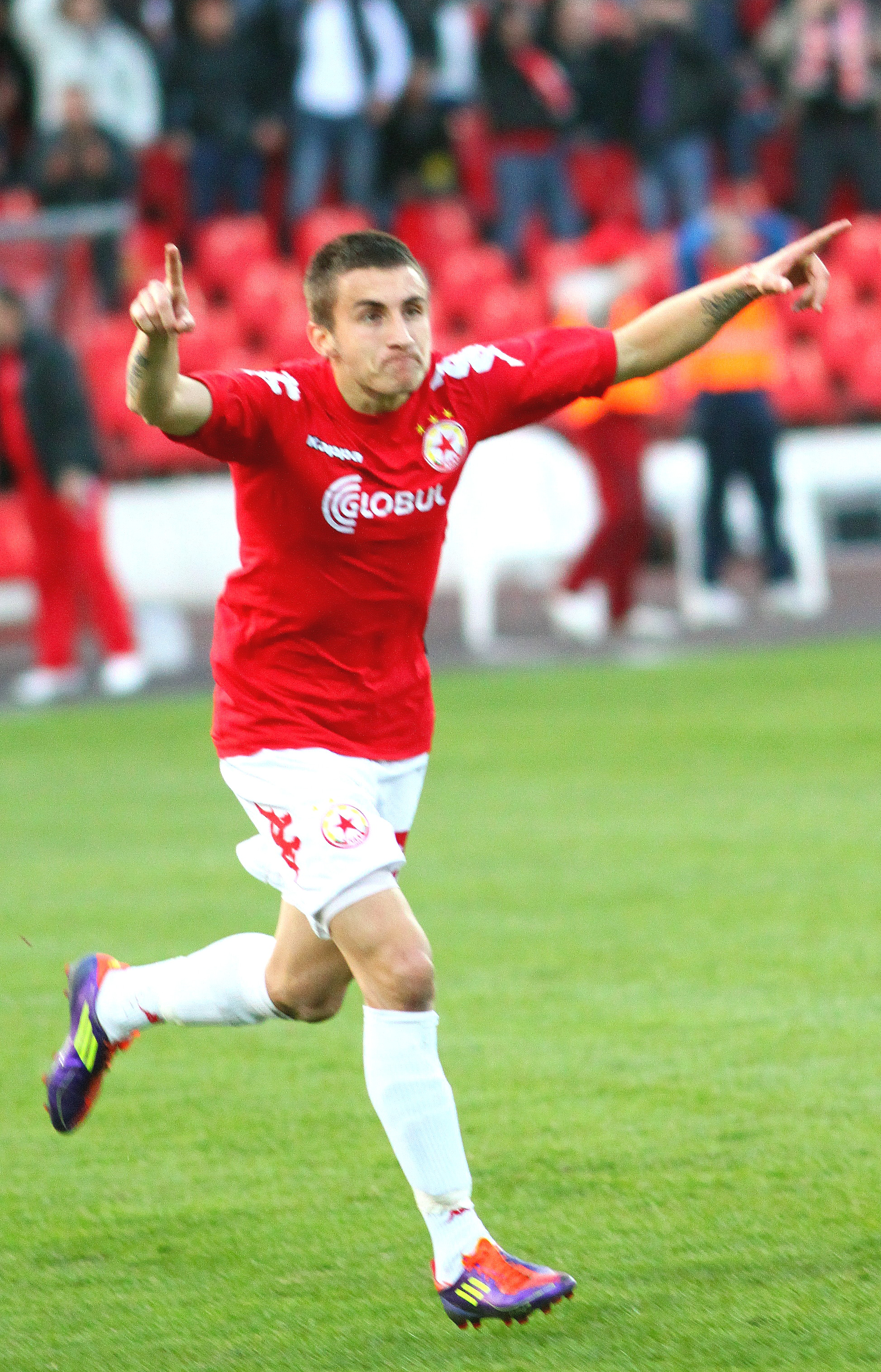
- Karachanakov in 2012

Personal information
- Full name: Anton Atanasov Karachanakov
- Date of birth: 17 January 1992 (age 34)
- Place of birth: Novo Delchevo, Bulgaria
- Height: 1.75 m (5 ft 9 in)
- Position: Winger

Team information
- Current team: Belasitsa Petrich
- Number: 77

Youth career
- 2006–2010: Pirin Blagoevgrad

Senior career*
Years	Team	Apps	(Gls)
2011	Pirin Blagoevgrad	14	(4)
2011–2014	CSKA Sofia	53	(13)
2015	Baltika Kaliningrad	7	(0)
2015–2016	Slavia Sofia	19	(6)
2016–2018	Cracovia	5	(0)
2017–2018	→ Beroe (loan)	38	(5)
2018–2019	Panachaiki	4	(0)
2019	Botev Plovdiv	12	(0)
2019–2020	Tsarsko Selo	13	(2)
2020–2022	Pirin Blagoevgrad	55	(13)
2022	Politehnica Iași	3	(0)
2023	Montana	12	(5)
2023	Makedonija GP	4	(0)
2024–2025	Vihren Sandanski	50	(6)
2025–	Belasitsa Petrich	11	(3)

International career
2011–2014	Bulgaria U21	7	(1)
- * Club domestic league appearances and goals as of 24 May 2026

Anton Karachanakov (Bulgarian: Антон Карачанаков; born 17 January 1992) is a Bulgarian professional footballer who plays as a winger for Belasitsa Petrich.

== Career ==
=== Pirin Blagoevgrad ===
Born in Novo Delchevo, near Sandanski, Karachanakov progressed through Pirin Blagoevgrad's youth system, having joined the club at the age of 14 in 2006.

He made his first team debut on 26 February 2011 in a 1–0 A PFG loss against Cherno More, coming on as a substitute for Anton Kostadinov. On 12 March, he scored his first goal in his first start, netting Pirin's only goal in their 2–1 loss against Litex Lovech.

Karachanakov finished the 2010–11 season with 16 appearances and four goals in all competitions, helping Pirin to secure their status in the top-flight of Bulgarian football league system. Finally, Pirin was relegated to fourth division, after the license necessary to play in the A PFG was denied by Bulgarian Football Federation.

=== CSKA Sofia ===
On 18 June 2011, Karachanakov joined CSKA Sofia on a free transfer. He scored his first league goal for CSKA on 22 March 2012, in the 4–0 home win over Lokomotiv Sofia. He scored in his next two games as well, against Lokomotiv Plovdiv on 25 March and against Beroe Stara Zagora three days later.

On 31 August 2012, Karachanakov scored his first brace for the club, scoring twice in a 4–1 away win against Minyor Pernik. In October 2012, he sustained an injury during The Eternal Derby and was ruled out until the end of the season.

Karachanakov made a full recovery by June 2013. On 14 December 2013, he scored his first two goals (and second brace for the club) after coming back from injury in a 7–0 thrashing of Lyubimets 2007.

On 27 July 2014, Karachanakov scored the opening goal and assisted Sergiu Buș' second in the 2–0 win over Levski Sofia in The Eternal Derby. For his performance he won the Man of the Match award. In January 2015, he left the "armymen" due to a combination of financial reasons (unreceived salaries) and not being granted sufficient playing time.

=== Botev Plovdiv ===
Karachanakov signed with Botev Plovdiv in January 2019. He left the team by mutual consent in August 2019 and joined Tsarsko Selo.

== International career ==
His first goal for the Bulgarian U21 squad came in his second match on 29 February 2012 as he scored the only goal in a 1–0 friendly win against Poland U21.

== Career statistics ==
As of 14 April 2021

Club	Season	League		Cup		Europe		Total	
Club	Season	Apps	Goals	Apps	Goals	Apps	Goals	Apps	Goals
Pirin Blagoevgrad	2010–11	14	4	2	0	–	–	16	4
CSKA Sofia	2011–12	13	4	2	0	0	0	15	4
CSKA Sofia	2012–13	9	3	0	0	2	0	11	3
CSKA Sofia	2013–14	16	2	2	0	0	0	18	2
CSKA Sofia	2014–15	15	4	1	0	1	1	17	5
Baltika Kaliningrad	2014–15	7	0	0	0	–	–	7	0
Slavia Sofia	2015–16	19	6	1	0	–	–	20	6
Cracovia	2015–16	5	0	0	0	–	–	5	0
Cracovia	2016–17	0	0	1	0	2	0	3	0
Beroe Stara Zagora (loan)	2016–17	12	4	0	0	0	0	12	4
Beroe Stara Zagora (loan)	2017–18	26	1	2	0	–	–	28	1
Panachaiki	2018–19	4	0	2	0	–	–	6	0
Botev Plovdiv	2018–19	11	0	1	0	–	–	12	0
Botev Plovdiv	2019–20	1	0	0	0	–	–	1	0
Tsarsko Selo	2019–20	13	2	1	0	–	–	14	2
Pirin Blagoevgrad	2020–21	25	7	1	0	0	0	26	7
Career total		190	37	16	0	5	1	211	38

== Honours ==
CSKA Sofia

- Bulgarian Supercup: 2011
