= 2021 Kazakhstan Super Cup final =

Final of the 14th edition of Kazakhstan Super Cup

- Event: 2021 Kazakhstan Super Cup
Tobol	Astana
1	1
- Tobol won 5–4 on penalties
- Date: 6 March 2021
- Venue: Turkistan Arena, Turkistan
- Referee: Denis Izmailov (Taldykorgan)
- Attendance: 2,000

The 2021 Kazakhstan Super Cup final decided the winner of the 2021 Kazakhstan Super Cup, the 14th edition of the annual Kazakh football super cup competition. The match was played on 6 March 2021 at the Turkistan Arena in Turkistan, Kazakhstan.

Tobol won the match 5–4 on penalties to win their first Kazakhstan Super Cup title.

== Teams ==
Team	Qualification for tournament	Previous finals appearances (bold indicates winners)
Tobol	2020 Kazakhstan Premier League runners-up	2 (2008, 2011)
Astana	2020 Kazakhstan Premier League third place	8 (**2011**, 2013, **2015**, 2016, 2017, **2018**, **2019**, **2020**)

== Route to the final ==
Tobol		Round	Astana	
Opponent	Result	2021 Kazakhstan Super Cup	Opponent	Result
Kairat	1–1, 4–2 (p)	Semi-finals	Shakhter Karagandy	2–0

== Match ==
=== Details ===
6 March 2021
15:00 UTC+6

Tobol	1–1	Astana
Malyi 15'	Report	Tomasov 90+1'
Penalties
Muzhikov (penalty scored); Amanović (penalty scored); Tagybergen (penalty scored); Jovančić (penalty scored); Nurgaliyev (penalty scored)	5–4	(penalty scored) Beysebekov; (penalty scored) Ciupercă; (penalty missed) Murtazayev; (penalty scored) Barseghyan; (penalty scored) Zarutsky

Turkistan Arena, Turkistan
Attendance: 2,000
Referee: Denis Izmailov (Taldykorgan)

**Tobol**	**Astana**

GK	35	(Kazakhstan) Aleksandr Mokin
DF	7	(Kazakhstan) Dmitri Miroshnichenko		(substituted off) 72'
DF	17	(Kazakhstan) Ruslan Valiullin
DF	22	(Kazakhstan) Aleksandr Marochkin
DF	25	(Kazakhstan) Serhiy Malyi	(yellow card) 81'
DF	45	(North Macedonia) Aleksa Amanović
MF	8	(Kazakhstan) Askhat Tagybergen
MF	10	(Kazakhstan) Serikzhan Muzhikov
MF	11	(France) Jérémy Manzorro		(substituted off) 72'
MF	15	(Guinea-Bissau) Toni Silva		(substituted off) 39'
FW	99	(Georgia (country)) Elguja Lobjanidze		(substituted off) 86'
Substitutes:
GK	12	(Kazakhstan) Sultan Busurmanov
GK	41	(Kazakhstan) Yegor Tsuprikov
DF	3	(Kazakhstan) Roman Asrankulov
MF	5	(Kazakhstan) Daniyar Semchenkov
MF	13	(Kazakhstan) Azat Nurgaliev	(yellow card) 77'	(substituted in) 39'
MF	14	(Kazakhstan) Samat Zharynbetov		(substituted in) 72'
FW	19	(Kazakhstan) Oralkhan Omirtayev		(substituted in) 86'
MF	20	(Kazakhstan) Zhaslan Zhumashev
DF	21	(Kazakhstan) Sultan Abilgazy	(yellow card) 89'
MF	29	(Serbia) Dušan Jovančić		(substituted in) 72'
MF	40	(Portugal) Carlos Fonseca
MF	47	(Kazakhstan) Vyacheslav Kulpeisov
Manager:
(Kazakhstan) Grigori Babayan

GK	1	(Kazakhstan) Dmytro Nepohodov		(substituted off) 90+4'
DF	2	(Croatia) Antonio Rukavina
DF	3	(Armenia) Varazdat Haroyan	(yellow card) 10'
DF	15	(Kazakhstan) Abzal Beisebekov
DF	18	(Kazakhstan) Sagi Sovet	(yellow card) 21'
DF	24	(Croatia) Luka Šimunović
DF	33	(Montenegro) Žarko Tomašević
MF	7	(Belarus) Max Ebong		(substituted off) 70'
MF	11	(Armenia) Tigran Barseghyan	(yellow card) 45+1'
MF	14	(Croatia) Marin Tomasov
FW	99	(Bosnia and Herzegovina) Semir Smajlagić	(yellow card) 48'	(substituted off) 66'
Substitutes:
GK	55	(Kazakhstan) Aleksandr Zarutskiy		(substituted in) 90+4'
GK	31	(Kazakhstan) Danil Podymksy
DF	5	(Kazakhstan) Mark Gorman
DF	19	(Kazakhstan) Lev Skvortsov
FW	45	(Kazakhstan) Roman Murtazayev		(substituted in) 66'
FW	72	(Kazakhstan) Stanislav Basmanov
FW	80	(Kazakhstan) Vladislav Prokopenko
MF	87	(Kazakhstan) Zhaslan Kairkenov
MF	92	(Moldova) Valeriu Ciupercă		(substituted in) 70'
Manager:
(Russia) Andrey Tikhonov

Man of the Match:

Assistant referees:
Ilashbek OrunbayevShymkent
Aydin Tasybayev (Pavlodar)
Reserve assistant referee:
Zhandos Abzhan (Shymkent)
Saken Bayimbet (Taraz)

**Match rules**

- 90 minutes.
- 30 minutes of extra time if necessary.
- Penalty shoot-out if scores still level.
- Nine named substitutes.
- Maximum of five substitutions, with a sixth allowed in extra time. (Note: Each team was given only three opportunities to make substitutions, with a fourth opportunity in extra time, excluding substitutions made at half-time, before the start of extra time and at half-time in extra time.)
