= Novo Delchevo =

- Village
- Location within Bulgaria
- Coordinates: 41°30′N 23°17′E
- Country: Bulgaria
- Province: Blagoevgrad Province
- Municipality: Sandanski
- Time zone: UTC+2 (EET)
  - Summer (DST): UTC+3 (EEST)

Novo Delchevo is a village in the municipality of Sandanski, in Blagoevgrad Province, Bulgaria.
