= Stephen Sunday =

Nigerian footballer (born 1988)

Sunny
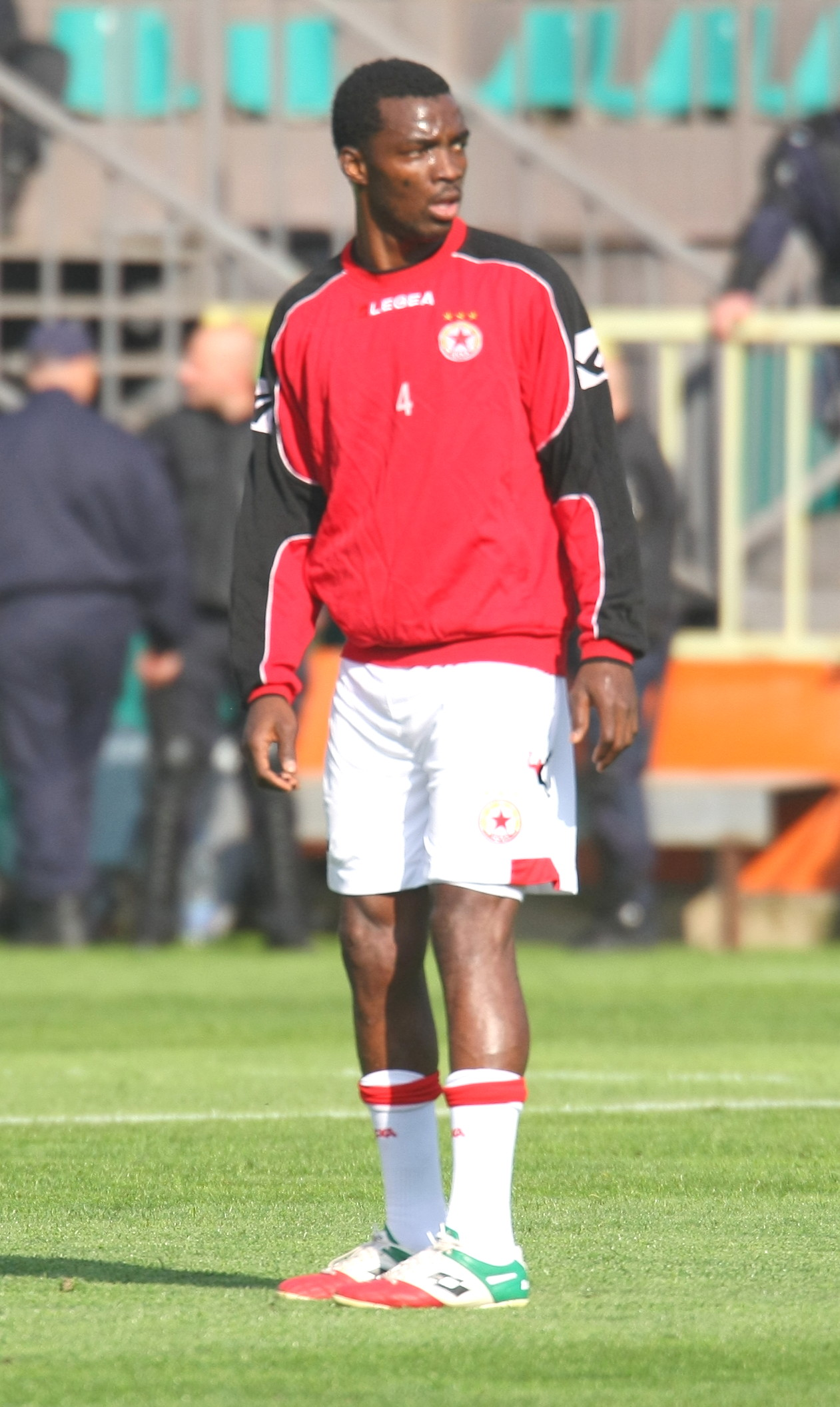
- Sunny before a game with CSKA Sofia in 2014

Personal information
- Full name: Stephen Obayan Sunday
- Date of birth: 17 September 1988 (age 38)
- Place of birth: Lagos, Nigeria
- Height: 1.80 m (5 ft 11 in)
- Position: Midfielder

Youth career
- Ebedei
- 2003–2004: Jegede Babes
- 2004–2005: Poli Ejido

Senior career*
Years	Team	Apps	(Gls)
2005–2007	Poli Ejido	63	(0)
2007–2011	Valencia	10	(0)
2008–2009	→ Osasuna (loan)	4	(0)
2009–2010	→ Betis (loan)	7	(0)
2011	→ Numancia (loan)	14	(2)
2011–2013	Numancia	62	(2)
2013	Bnei Sakhnin	2	(0)
2014–2015	CSKA Sofia	36	(0)
2015–2016	Alanyaspor	12	(0)
2016–2018	Real Salt Lake	59	(1)
2016–2017	→ Real Monarchs (loan)	3	(0)
2019–2020	Pafos	5	(0)

International career
2007	Spain U19	5	(0)
2007	Spain U20	4	(0)
2009	Spain U21	1	(0)
2010	Nigeria	1	(0)
- * Club domestic league appearances and goals as of 1 July 2020

Stephen Obayan Sunday (born 17 September 1988), nicknamed Sunny, is a Nigerian former professional footballer who played as a defensive midfielder.

== Club career ==
=== Early years ===
Born in Lagos, Sunny began his career in Nigeria with Ebedei and Jegede Babes. In 2003, he participated in two youth championships in Sweden and Spain: in the latter he appeared in Madrid's third edition of the Annual Immigrants World Cup, where he impressed so much he was given a five-year contract with Polideportivo Ejido, in the Segunda División.

=== Valencia ===
Sunny became a regular player for the Andalusia team, making 65 competitive appearances during his two-year spell and signing for Valencia in the summer, but after one season where he was scarcely used, he was loaned to fellow La Liga club Osasuna. In late January 2009, he was linked with a move to England's Portsmouth, but the deal eventually collapsed due to financial complications.

On 30 June 2009, after a season which was marred by injury, Sunny was loaned to Betis for one year with a view to a permanent four-year move. He also appeared rarely during the second-tier campaign, as the Verdiblancos failed to return to the top flight (seven matches out of 42).

In July 2010, Sunny had a trial in England with newly promoted Premier League side Blackpool, playing in a pre-season friendly against Crewe Alexandra on 27 July and four days later against Bristol City, but nothing came of it.

=== Numancia ===
Sunny spent the first months of the new season training on his own, having been deemed surplus to requirements by Valencia manager Unai Emery. On 19 January 2011 he was again loaned, moving to Numancia from division two.

In the following two years, still in that tier and already as a permanent signing, Sunny was first-choice for the Sorians. On 11 May 2011 he scored his first goal as a senior, netting the 2–1 winner away against Albacete.

=== Bnei Sakhnin / CSKA Sofia ===
On 30 July 2013, Sunny signed a two-year contract with Israeli club Bnei Sakhnin. On 3 January of the following year, he moved teams and countries again, joining Bulgaria's CSKA Sofia after agreeing to a two-and-a-half-year deal.

=== Real Salt Lake ===
After starting out the season in Turkey with Alanyaspor, Sunny joined Real Salt Lake on 21 January 2016. He scored his first Major League Soccer goal on 12 March, helping to a 2–1 home defeat of Seattle Sounders FC.

Sunny was released following the 2018 campaign.

=== Pafos ===
In July 2019, Sunny signed for Cypriot First Division club Pafos.

== International career ==
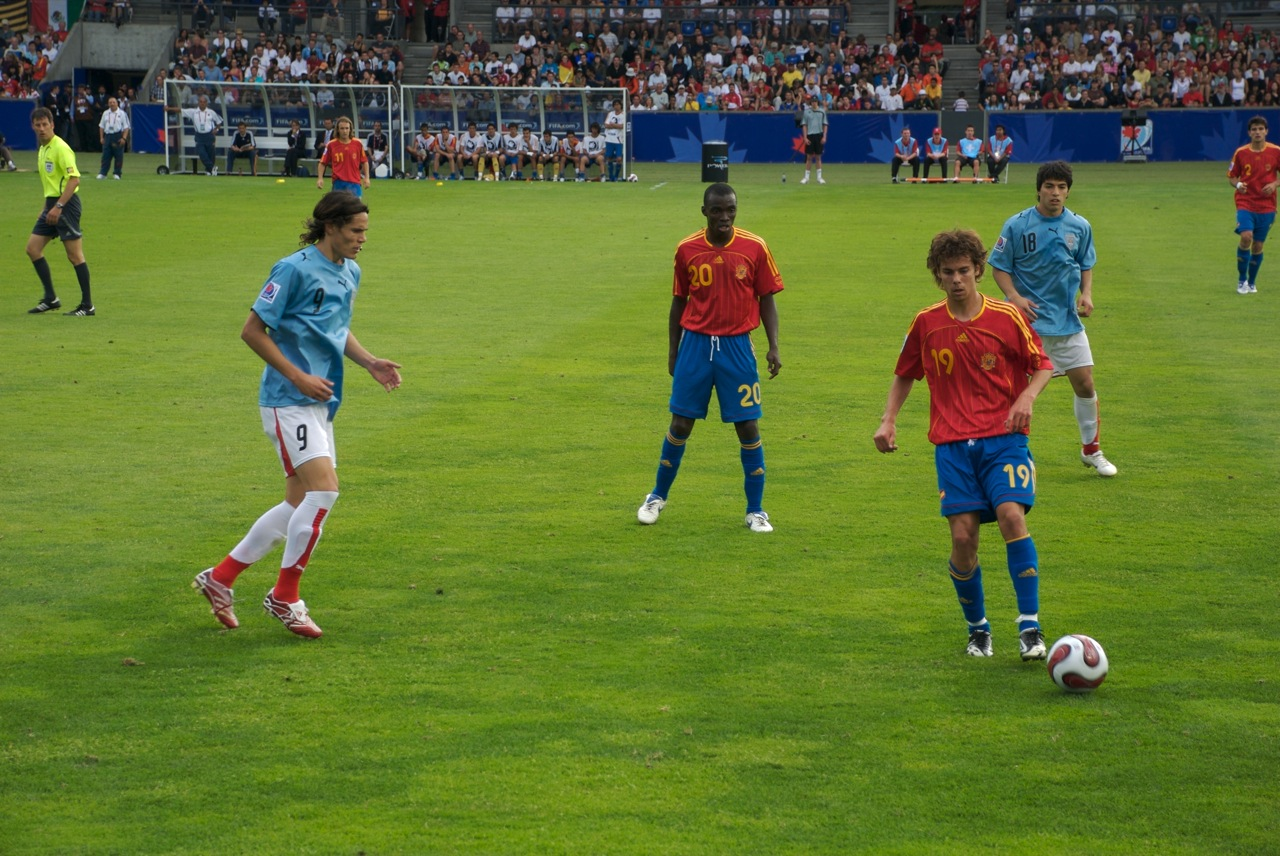
Sunday (middle) playing at the 2007 U-20 World Cup against Uruguay.

Sunday, who was born in Nigeria, was eligible to play for Spain under FIFA rules allowing players with dual nationality and without full international caps to switch allegiance before the age of 21. After first appearing for the under-19 side, he was called up by his adopted nation to the 2007 FIFA U-20 World Cup in Canada, playing four games as the team exited in the quarter-finals.

In September 2010, Sunny was called up for Nigeria's 2012 Africa Cup of Nations qualifier in Guinea scheduled for the following month. He made his debut in that game as a starter, in a 1–0 loss in Conakry.

== Honours ==
Valencia

- Copa del Rey: 2007–08
