= Tonći Kukoč =

Croatian footballer (born 1990)

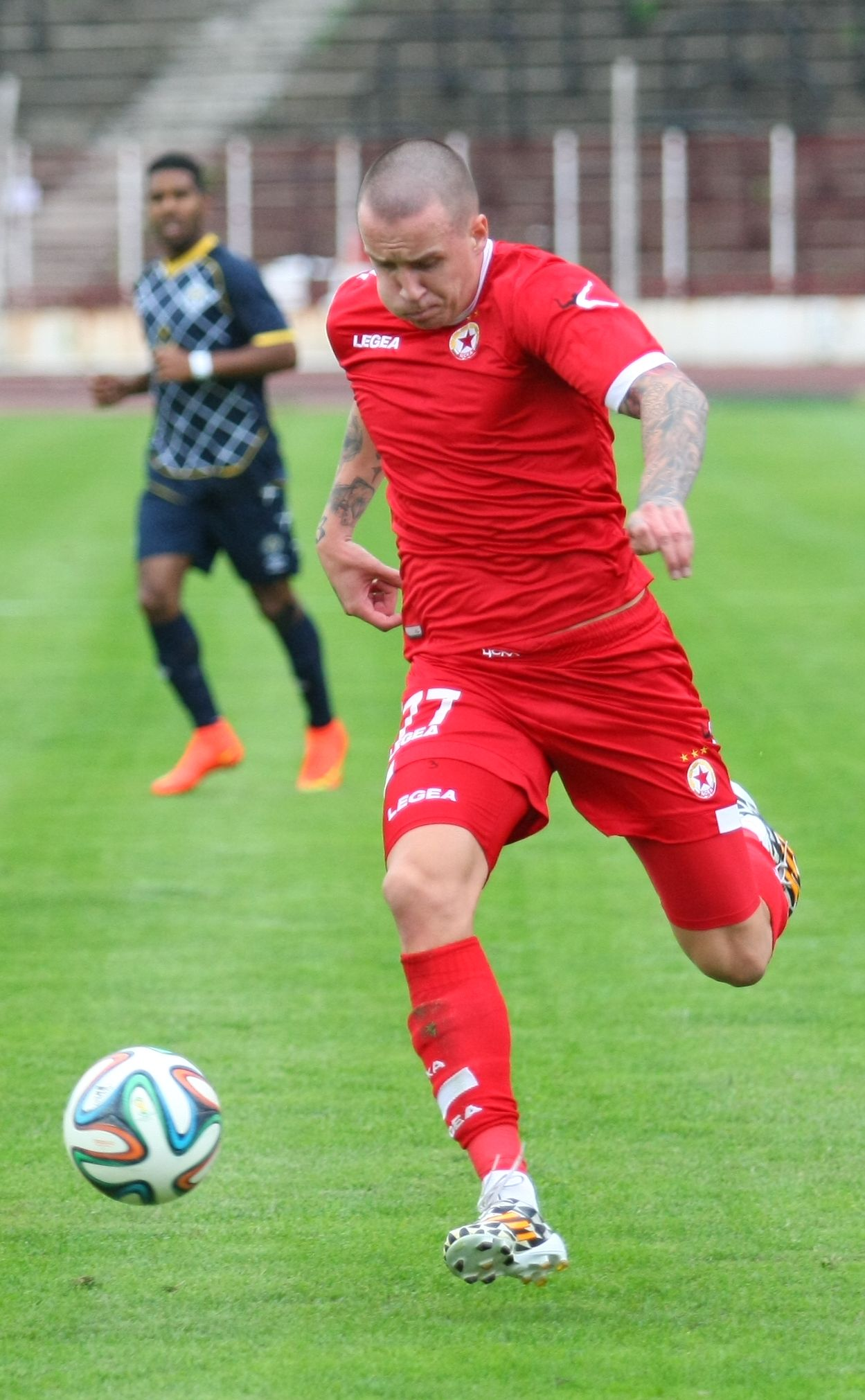
- Kukoč in 2014

Personal information
- Full name: Tonći Kukoč-Petraello
- Date of birth: 25 September 1990 (age 36)
- Place of birth: Split, SR Croatia, Yugoslavia
- Height: 1.90 m (6 ft 3 in)
- Position: Left back

Team information
- Current team: Segesta
- Number: 33

Youth career
- –2003: Krilnik Split
- 2003–2005: Omladinac Vranjic
- 2005–2007: RNK Split
- 2007–2009: Hajduk Split

Senior career*
Years	Team	Apps	(Gls)
2009–2013	Hajduk Split	22	(2)
2009	→ Istra 1961 (loan)	5	(0)
2010	→ NK Mosor (loan)	12	(2)
2011	→ Hrvatski Dragovoljac (loan)	5	(1)
2013–2014	Brescia	24	(0)
2014–2015	CSKA Sofia	22	(2)
2015–2016	Livorno	5	(0)
2016	Como	2	(0)
2017	Zrinjski Mostar	5	(1)
2018–2020	Budapest Honvéd	50	(1)
2020	Kisvárda	2	(0)
2021	Opatija	17	(1)
2022–2023	Opatija	50	(13)
2023–	Segesta	69	(21)

International career^{‡}
2011	Croatia U21	3	(0)
- * Club domestic league appearances and goals as of 1 December 2023 ‡ National team caps and goals as of 10 October 2011

Tonći Kukoč-Petraello (born 25 September 1990) is a Croatian football left back who is currently plays in Segesta.

He is the nephew of the former NBA player Toni Kukoč.

== Club career ==
Born in Split, Kukoč started his career playing in youth level for his hometown club Hajduk Split. At the age of 18 he passed the trial with the Russian club Saturn, but Hajduk refused to release him as they had a scholarship contract with him until June 2009.

After signing a four-year contract with Hajduk, Kukoč was loaned to Istra 1961 for the first part of the 2009–10 season. The rest of the season he spent on loan in the second division side Mosor. He made his professional debut for Hajduk the following season, when he replaced Ante Vukušić in the final minutes of the home match against NK Zagreb. In the midseason Kukoč was again loaned, this time to the last placed Hrvatski Dragovoljac in Prva HNL. He played five games for Dragovoljac, and scored his first goal in Prva HNL, after coming on as a substitute in a 3–2 defeat against Inter Zaprešić.

Hajduk decided to keep him for the 2011–12 Prva HNL season and has worked as a rotational player, playing in a few different positions. He scored his first goal for the club in a 4–0 win against NK Zagreb on 21 August 2011.

After spending one season at Italian side Brescia Calcio in Serie B, Kukoč joined CSKA Sofia in Bulgaria on 7 August 2014. He made his league debut for CSKA on 16 August, in a 2–0 away loss against Ludogorets Razgrad, playing the full 90 minutes as a left-back. Kukoč netted his first goal on 22 August, in the 5–0 home rout against Marek Dupnitsa. On 1 November 2014, he came close to opening the scoring in the 0–0 home draw against Slavia Sofia, hitting the crossbar with a powerful long-distance effort, but subsequently received a two-match ban following a post-match altercation with Georgi Petkov.

== Career statistics ==
=== Club ===
As of 22 January 2016

Club performance			League		Cup		Continental		Other		Total	
Club	League	Season	Apps	Goals	Apps	Goals	Apps	Goals	Apps	Goals	Apps	Goals
Istra 1961 (loan)	2009–10	Prva HNL	5	0	0	0	–		–		5	0
Mosor (loan)	2009–10	Druga HNL	12	2	0	0	–		–		12	2
Hajduk Split	2010–11	Prva HNL	1	0	0	0	–		–		1	0
Hr. Dragovoljac (loan)	2010–11	Prva HNL	5	1	0	0	–		–		5	1
Hajduk Split	2011–12	Prva HNL	20	2	3	0	1	0	–		24	2
Hajduk Split	2012–13	Prva HNL	1	0	1	0	1	0	–		3	0
Brescia	2013–14	Serie B	24	0	2	0	–		–		26	0
CSKA Sofia	2014–15	A Group	22	2	1	0	0	0	–		23	2
Livorno	2015–16	Serie B	5	0	0	0	–		–		5	0
Como	2015–16	Serie B	0	0	0	0	–		–		0	0
Career total			95	7	7	0	2	0	0	0	104	7
