= Abdul-Basit Adam =

Ghanaian footballer

Personal information
- Date of birth: 13 February 1995 (age 31)
- Place of birth: Kumasi, Ghana
- Height: 1.86 m (6 ft 1 in)
- Position: Forward

Youth career
- Golden Lions Academy

Senior career*
Years	Team	Apps	(Gls)
2012–2013	Berekum Chelsea FC	19	(2)
2013–2015	Free State Stars	26	(9)
2015	Giresunspor	0	(0)
2016	New Edubiase United	0	(0)
2016	→ Gefle IF (loan)	5	(0)
2016	IK Frej	10	(2)
2018–2019	Çanakkale Dardanelspor	21	(9)
- * Club domestic league appearances and goals as of 15:08, 3 February 2020 (UTC)

Abdul-Basit Adam (born 13 February 1995, Kumasi, Ghana) is a Ghanaian professional footballer who plays as a forward.
