= Cendrino Misidjan =

Dutch footballer (born 1988)

Personal information
- Full name: Cendrino Quincy Misidjan
- Date of birth: 29 August 1988 (age 38)
- Place of birth: Paramaribo, Suriname
- Height: 1.91 m (6 ft 3 in)
- Position: Left-back

Youth career
- Fortitudo Culemborg
- 2001–2007: RKC Waalwijk

Senior career*
Years	Team	Apps	(Gls)
2007–2009	Stormvogels Telstar	13	(0)
2009–2010	Omniworld	1	(0)
2010–2011	FC Oss	26	(0)
2011–2012	Almere City	18	(0)
2012–2013	Go Ahead Eagles	25	(0)
2013–2014	Sparta Rotterdam	14	(1)
2014	CSKA Sofia	1	(0)
2015	Emmen	7	(0)
2015–2016	Ermis Aradippou	8	(0)
2016–2017	De Treffers	7	(2)
2017	VVV-Venlo	12	(0)
2017–2018	Dordrecht	17	(1)
2018	De Treffers	12	(1)
2018–2019	Spakenburg	33	(1)
2019–2020	De Treffers	15	(3)
2020–2021	TEC	4	(0)
Total		213	(9)
- * Club domestic league appearances and goals

Cendrino Quincy Misidjan (born 29 August 1988) is a Dutch former professional footballer who played as a left-back.

== Career ==
He formerly played for Stormvogels Telstar, Almere City, FC Oss, Go Ahead Eagles, Sparta Rotterdam and Bulgarian side CSKA Sofia. During his stay in CSKA, he found it hard to establish himself as an integral part of the squad and only made one appearance in a 4–0 win for CSKA against Haskovo at Bulgarian Army Stadium and was later on released by the club in the winter break. Later he joined FC Emmen, where he made 7 appearances. After he played for Ermis Aradippou. In the 2016–17 season he played for De Treffers in which he made 7 appearances and scored twice, and then moved to play for VVV-Venlo.
