= Maksims Uvarenko =

Latvian footballer

Personal information
- Date of birth: 17 January 1987 (age 39)
- Place of birth: Ventspils, Latvian SSR, Soviet Union (now Republic of Latvia)
- Height: 1.88 m (6 ft 2 in)
- Position: Goalkeeper

Youth career
- Ventspils

Senior career*
Years	Team	Apps	(Gls)
2004–2006	Ventspils	0	(0)
2006–2009	Slovan Liberec	1	(0)
2008–2009	→ Vítkovice (loan)	13	(0)
2010–2012	Vysočina Jihlava	53	(0)
2012–2014	Ventspils	75	(0)
2015	CSKA Sofia	2	(0)
2015	Zlaté Moravce	0	(0)
2016–2019	Ventspils	8	(0)
2020	Levanger		

International career^{‡}
2003	Latvia U-17	1	(0)
- * Club domestic league appearances and goals as of 10 June 2016 ‡ National team caps and goals as of 13 August 2009

Maksims Uvarenko (born 17 January 1987 in Ventspils) is a Latvian football goalkeeper.

== Career ==
Uvarenko signed a contract with Slovan Liberec in January 2006. He made his debut the following year. Being a bright talent in Latvia, he played for many Latvian national youth teams.

It was difficult for him to find a place in the starting line-up, since he joined the team, so he signed a contract with the Czech 2. Liga club Vysočina Jihlava in February 2010, hoping to become the first choice keeper there.

In 2012, Uvarenko joined his former club FK Ventspils in the Latvian Higher League.

On 13 January 2015, Uvarenko signed with CSKA Sofia in Bulgaria on a one-and-a-half-year deal. He kept a clean sheet in his official debut for the "redmen" on 21 March 2015 – a 0:0 home draw with Beroe.

=== National team ===
Uvarenko played for the Latvian U-17 in 2003.
