= 2011–12 PFC Ludogorets Razgrad season =

Ludogorets Razgrad
2011–12 season
- Chairman: Aleksandar Aleksandrov
- Manager: Ivaylo Petev
- A Group: Winners
- Bulgarian Cup: Winners
- Top goalscorer: League: Ivan Stoyanov (16); All: Ivan Stoyanov (19)
- Highest home attendance: 6,000 vs Levski Sofia and CSKA Sofia
- Lowest home attendance: 510 vs Slavia Sofia (Kavarna Stadium)
- Average home league attendance: 4,001
Home colours	Away colours	Third colours

The 2011–12 season was Ludogorets Razgrad's first season in the A Football Group. Ludogorets Razgrad won their first Bulgarian Cup on 16 May, defeating Lokomotiv Plovdiv 2–1, before completing the domestic double a week later by defeating CSKA Sofia 1–0 on 23 May 2012 to claim their first top flight league title.

== Squad ==
As of match played 23 May 2012

No.	Name	Nationality	Position	Date of birth (age)	Signed from	Signed in	Contract ends	Apps.	Goals
Goalkeepers
1	Uroš Golubović	(Serbia)	GK	19 August 1976 (aged 35)	Litex Lovech	2011		33	0
13	Radek Petr	(Czech Republic)	GK	24 February 1987 (aged 25)	Eupen	2012		2	0
30	Georgi Argilashki	(Bulgaria)	GK	13 June 1991 (aged 20)	Brestnik 1948	2011		0	0
Defenders
3	Marián Jarabica	(Slovakia)	DF	27 April 1989 (aged 23)	loan from Cracovia	2011		1	0
4	Tero Mäntylä	(Finland)	DF	18 April 1991 (aged 21)	Inter Turku	2012		4	0
5	Alexandre Barthe	(France)	DF	5 March 1986 (aged 26)	Litex Lovech	2011		32	3
20	Choco	(Brazil)	DF	18 January 1990 (aged 22)	Santos	2011		32	1
25	Yordan Minev	(Bulgaria)	DF	14 October 1980 (aged 31)	Botev Plovdiv	2011		33	0
33	Ľubomír Guldan	(Slovakia)	DF	30 January 1983 (aged 29)	MŠK Žilina	2011		33	0
77	Vitinha	(Portugal)	DF	11 February 1986 (aged 26)	Concordia Chiajna	2012		11	0
Midfielders
6	Georgi Kostadinov	(Bulgaria)	MF	7 September 1990 (aged 21)	Pomorie	2012		5	2
7	Mihail Aleksandrov	(Bulgaria)	MF	11 June 1989 (aged 22)	Akademik Sofia	2010		41	9
8	Stanislav Genchev	(Bulgaria)	MF	20 March 1981 (aged 31)	Vaslui	2012		32	7
18	Svetoslav Dyakov	(Bulgaria)	MF	31 May 1984 (aged 27)	Lokomotiv Sofia	2012		34	1
22	Miroslav Ivanov	(Bulgaria)	MF	9 November 1991 (aged 20)	Montana	2011		42	7
23	Emil Gargorov	(Bulgaria)	MF	15 February 1991 (aged 21)	CSKA Sofia	2011		30	14
36	Mladen Kašćelan	(Montenegro)	MF	13 February 1983 (aged 29)	loan from Jagiellonia Białystok	2012		13	1
37	Jakub Hronec	(Slovakia)	MF	5 September 1992 (aged 19)	Birmingham City	2011		0	0
73	Ivan Stoyanov	(Bulgaria)	MF	24 July 1983 (aged 28)	Alania Vladikavkaz	2011		30	19
84	Marcelinho	(Brazil)	MF	24 August 1984 (aged 27)	Bragantino	2011		30	13
Forwards
11	Juninho Quixadá	(Brazil)	FW	12 December 1985 (aged 26)	Bragantino	2011		12	5
19	Dimo Bakalov	(Bulgaria)	FW	19 December 1988 (aged 23)	Sliven	2011		17	2
27	Christian Kabasele	(Belgium)	DF	24 February 1991 (aged 21)	Eupen	2011	2014	15	6
Players who left during the season
9	Miroslav Antonov	(Bulgaria)	FW	10 March 1986 (aged 26)	Levski Sofia	2011		8	3
Players who left during the season
4	Jure Travner	(Slovenia)	DF	28 September 1985 (aged 26)	St Mirren	2011		4	0
6	Nikolay Dyulgerov	(Bulgaria)	MF	10 March 1988 (aged 24)	Slavia Sofia	2011		2	0
10	Todor Kolev	(Bulgaria)	FW	8 February 1980 (aged 32)	Slavia Sofia	2011		22	10
13	Emil Mihaylov	(Bulgaria)	GK	1 March 1988 (aged 24)	Akademik Sofia	2011		6	0
17	Franco Bano	(Uruguay)	DF	30 March 1986 (aged 26)	Miramar Misiones	2011		0	0
21	Dimo Atanasov	(Bulgaria)	MF	31 May 1984 (aged 27)	Lokomotiv Sofia	2011		17	3
24	Shener Remzi	(Bulgaria)	MF	18 August 1976 (aged 35)	Chernomorets Burgas	2010		27	2
30	Hristo Nikolov	(Bulgaria)	GK	5 March 1980 (aged 32)	Dorostol Silistra	2011		0	0
77	Suvad Grabus	(Bosnia and Herzegovina)	DF	14 December 1981 (aged 30)	Travnik	2011		1	0

== Transfers ==
=== In ===
Date	Position	Nationality	Name	From	Fee	Ref.
30 July 2011	DF	(France)	Alexandre Barthe	Litex Lovech	Undisclosed	
19 August 2011	DF	(Slovenia)	Jure Travner	St Mirren	Undisclosed	
19 August 2011	MF	(Slovakia)	Jakub Hronec	Birmingham City	Undisclosed	
22 August 2011	FW	(Belgium)	Christian Kabasele	Eupen	Undisclosed	
29 August 2011	MF	(Bulgaria)	Ivan Stoyanov	Alania Vladikavkaz	Undisclosed	
Summer 2011	GK	(Bulgaria)	Hristo Nikolov	Dorostol Silistra	Undisclosed	
Summer 2011	GK	(Serbia)	Uroš Golubović	Litex Lovech	Undisclosed	
Summer 2011	DF	(Argentina)	Franco Bano	Miramar Misiones	Undisclosed	
Summer 2011	DF	(Bosnia and Herzegovina)	Suvad Grabus	Travnik	Undisclosed	
Summer 2011	DF	(Bulgaria)	Yordan Minev	Botev Plovdiv	Undisclosed	
Summer 2011	DF	(Slovakia)	Ľubomír Guldan	MŠK Žilina	Undisclosed	
Summer 2011	MF	(Brazil)	Marcelinho	Bragantino	Undisclosed	
Summer 2011	MF	(Bulgaria)	Svetoslav Dyakov	Lokomotiv Sofia	Undisclosed	
Summer 2011	MF	(Bulgaria)	Stanislav Genchev	Vaslui	Undisclosed	
Summer 2011	MF	(Bulgaria)	Emil Gargorov	CSKA Sofia	Undisclosed	
Summer 2011	FW	(Brazil)	Juninho Quixadá	Bragantino	Undisclosed	
Summer 2011	FW	(Bulgaria)	Dimo Bakalov	Sliven 2000	Undisclosed	
Winter 2011	GK	(Bulgaria)	Georgi Argilashki	Brestnik 1948	Undisclosed	
Winter 2011	GK	(Czech Republic)	Radek Petr	Eupen	Undisclosed	
6 January 2012	DF	(Finland)	Tero Mäntylä	Inter Turku	Undisclosed	
6 January 2012	DF	(Portugal)	Vitinha	Concordia Chiajna	Undisclosed	
Winter 2011	MF	(Bulgaria)	Georgi Kostadinov	Chernomorets Pomorie	Undisclosed	

=== Loans in ===
Start date	Position	Nationality	Name	From	End date	Ref.
18 June 2011	DF	(Slovakia)	Marián Jarabica	Cracovia	End of Season	
24 January 2012	MF	(Montenegro)	Mladen Kašćelan	Jagiellonia Białystok	End of Season	

=== Out ===
Date	Position	Nationality	Name	To	Fee	Ref.
Summer 2011	GK	(Bulgaria)	Miroslav Grigorov	Nesebar	Undisclosed	
Summer 2011	DF	(Bulgaria)	Georgi Georgiev	Svetkavitsa	Undisclosed	
Summer 2011	DF	(Bulgaria)	Radoslav Komitov	Svetkavitsa	Undisclosed	
Summer 2011	DF	(Bulgaria)	Ventsislav Yordanov	Svetkavitsa	Undisclosed	
Summer 2011	DF	(Bulgaria)	Zheko Yordanov	Dimitrovgrad	Undisclosed	
Summer 2011	DF	(Bulgaria)	Stanislav Zhekov	Pelita Jaya	Undisclosed	
Summer 2011	MF	(Bulgaria)	Radoslav Anev	Etar 1924	Undisclosed	
Summer 2011	MF	(Bulgaria)	Diyan Dimov	Svetkavitsa	Undisclosed	
Summer 2011	MF	(Bulgaria)	Syuleiman Shakirov	Dunav Ruse	Undisclosed	
Summer 2011	FW	(Bulgaria)	Antonio Pavlov	Hapoel Jerusalem	Undisclosed	
Summer 2011	FW	(North Macedonia)	Zoran Zlatkovski	Malavan	Undisclosed	
Winter 2012	GK	(Bulgaria)	Emil Mihaylov	Lokomotiv Sofia	Undisclosed	
Winter 2012	DF	(Slovenia)	Jure Travner	Mura 05	Undisclosed	
Winter 2012	MF	(Bulgaria)	Nikolay Dyulgerov	CSKA Sofia	Undisclosed	
Winter 2012	FW	(Bulgaria)	Todor Kolev	Etar 1924	Undisclosed	

=== Loans out ===
Start date	Position	Nationality	Name	To	End date	Ref.
Summer 2011	MF	(Slovakia)	Jakub Hronec	Kaliakra Kavarna	Winter 2012	
Winter 2012	FW	(Bulgaria)	Miroslav Antonov	Montana	End of Season	

=== Released ===
Date	Position	Nationality	Name	Joined	Date
6 December 2011	DF	(Bosnia and Herzegovina)	Suvad Grabus	Travnik	
Winter 2012	DF	(Argentina)	Franco Bano	Atenas	
Winter 2012	GK	(Bulgaria)	Hristo Nikolov		
Winter 2012	MF	(Bulgaria)	Shener Remzi	Kubrat	

== Competitions ==
=== Friendlies ===
23 July 2011	Parma	3–0	Ludogorets Razgrad	Stadio Ennio Tardini
		report

8 August 2011	Ludogorets Razgrad	2–1	FC Dinamo București	Ludogorets Arena
		report

9 February 2012	FC Dinamo București	–	Ludogorets Razgrad	Stadionul Dinamo
		[ report]

13 February 2012	CFR Cluj	–	Ludogorets Razgrad	Dr. Constantin Rădulescu
		[ report]

=== Bulgarian A Professional Football Group ===
==== League table ====
Pos	Team	Pld	W	D	L	GF	GA	GD	Pts	Qualification or relegation
1	Ludogorets Razgrad (C)	30	22	4	4	73	16	+57	70	Qualification for Champions League second qualifying round
2	CSKA Sofia	30	22	3	5	60	19	+41	69	Qualification for Europa League second qualifying round
3	Levski Sofia	30	20	2	8	61	28	+33	62	Qualification for Europa League second qualifying round
4	Chernomorets Burgas	30	17	9	4	57	23	+34	60	
5	Litex Lovech	30	17	8	5	57	28	+29	59	

Source: A PFG (in Bulgarian)
Rules for classification: 1st points; 2nd head-to-head points; 3rd head-to-head goal difference; 4th head-to-head goals scored; 5th head-to-head away goals scored; 6th goal difference; 7th goals scored
(C) Champions

==== Results summary ====
Overall								Home						Away					
Pld	W	D	L	GF	GA	GD	Pts	W	D	L	GF	GA	GD	W	D	L	GF	GA	GD
30	22	4	4	73	16	+57	70	12	2	1	41	6	+35	10	2	3	32	10	+22

Last updated: 13 January 2012.
Source: Soccerway

==== Results by round ====
Round	1	2	3	4	5	6	7	8	9	10	11	12	13	14	15	16	17	18	19	20	21	22	23	24	25	26	27	28	29	30
Ground	H	A	H	A	H	A	H	A	H	A	H	H	A	H	A	H	A	H	A	A	H	A	H	A	H	A	A	H	A	H
Result	D	W	W	W	W	W	W	W	W	L	W	W	D	W	D	W	W	W	L	L	L	W	W	W	D	W	W	W	W	W
Position	9	6	4	4	2	2	2	2	1	2	1	1	1	1	1	1	1	1	1	1	3	2	2	2	2	2	2	2	2	1

Source: Soccerway
A = Away; H = Home; W = Win; D = Draw; L = Loss

==== Fixtures and results ====
6 August 2011 1	Ludogorets Razgrad	0–0	Lokomotiv Plovdiv	Ludogorets Arena
		report		Attendance: 1,700

13 August 2011 2	Beroe	1–2	Ludogorets Razgrad	Hristo Botev Stadium
	Bachev 29'; Stanislav Bachev (yellow card) 46' (yellow-red card) 76'	report	Bakalov; Genchev 77' (pen.); Minev (yellow card) 71' (yellow-red card) 90+1'	Attendance: 2,650

20 August 2011 3	Ludogorets Razgrad	4–0	Vidima-Rakovski Sevlievo	Ludogorets Arena
	Gargorov 35'; Marcelinho 36', 67'; Juninho 74'	report		Attendance: 900

27 August 2011 4	Svetkavitsa	0–1	Ludogorets Razgrad	Dimitar Burkov Stadium
		report	Genchev 80'	Attendance: 4,800

11 September 2011 5	Ludogorets Razgrad	6–0	Slavia Sofia	Ludogorets Arena
	Gargorov 23', 52', 71'; Aleksandrov 58'; Juninho 82', 87'	report	Ivanov (yellow card) 31' (yellow-red card) 32'	Attendance: 510

18 September 2011 6	Cherno More	0–1	Ludogorets Razgrad	Ticha Stadium
		report	Aleksandrov 72'	Attendance: 3,900

25 September 2011 7	Ludogorets Razgrad	2–1	Levski Sofia	Ludogorets Arena
	Ivanov 10'; Gargorov 52'	report	Gadzhev 29'	Attendance: 6,000

30 September 2011 8	Botev Vratsa	0–1	Ludogorets Razgrad	Hristo Botev Stadium
		report	Stoyanov 90+2'	Attendance: 1,700

15 October 2011 9	Ludogorets Razgrad	4–1	Minyor Pernik	Ludogorets Arena
	Barthe 49'; Choco 62'; Marcelinho 88'; Todor Kolev 90+2'	report	Brahimi 11'; Markov (yellow card) 22' (yellow-red card) 42'	Attendance: 3,800

24 October 2011 10	Litex Lovech	2–1	Ludogorets Razgrad	Lovech Stadium
	Georgi Milanov 18'; Yanev 21'	report	Marcelinho 27'	Attendance: 1,800

31 October 2011 11	Ludogorets Razgrad	3–0	Montana	Ludogorets Arena
	Marcelinho 1', 29'; Barthe 14'	report		Attendance: 4,000

5 November 2011 12	Ludogorets Razgrad	4–0	Lokomotiv Sofia	Ludogorets Arena
	Marcelinho 31', 50'; Genchev 48', 90'	report		Attendance: 5,200

13 November 2011 13	Chernomorets Burgas	0–0	Ludogorets Razgrad	Lazur Stadium
		report		Attendance: 700

19 November 2011 14	Ludogorets Razgrad	2–0	Kaliakra Kavarna	Ludogorets Arena
	Aleksandrov 68'; Kabasele 90+4'	report	Dimitrov (yellow card) 65' (yellow-red card) 76'	Attendance: 5,500

28 November 2011 15	CSKA Sofia	2–2	Ludogorets Razgrad	Balgarska Armiya Stadium
	Moraes 2', 20'	report	Quixadá 86'; Stoyanov 90'	Attendance: 6,000

3 March 2012 16	Ludogorets Razgrad	3–0	Beroe	Ludogorets Arena
	Stoyanov 56', 60'; Gargorov 79'	report		Attendance: 4,400

10 March 2012 17	Vidima-Rakovski Sevlievo	0–5	Ludogorets Razgrad	Rakovski Stadium
		report	Genchev 13'; Gargorov 30', 33'; Stoyanov 44'; Juninho 86'	Attendance: 550

18 March 2012 18	Ludogorets Razgrad	5–0	Svetkavitsa	Ludogorets Arena
	Trifonov 45' (o.g.); Ivanov 67'; Kabasele 79', 90+1'; Kostadinov 84'	Summary		Attendance: 4,200

21 March 2012 19	Lokomotiv Plovdiv	1–0	Ludogorets Razgrad	Lokomotiv Stadium
	Venkov 48'	report		Attendance: 3,200

24 March 2012 20	Slavia Sofia	3–2	Ludogorets Razgrad	Ovcha Kupel
	Dimitrov 22', 79'; Zlatinov 61'	report	Barthe 28'; Aleksandrov 51'	Attendance: 420

29 March 2012 21	Ludogorets Razgrad	0–2	Cherno More	Ludogorets Arena
		report	Palomino 18'; Manolov 56'	Attendance: 3,300

2 April 2012 22	Levski Sofia	0–1	Ludogorets Razgrad	Georgi Asparuhov
	Starokin (red card) 87'; Yovov (red card) 90+2'	report	Stoyanov 38'; Golubović (yellow card) 90' (red card) 90+2'	Attendance: 5,700

7 April 2012 23	Ludogorets Razgrad	3–0	Botev Vratsa	Ludogorets Arena
	Stoyanov 9', 68' (pen.); Gargorov 78'	Summary		Attendance: 4,100

18 April 2012 24	Minyor Pernik	0–7	Ludogorets Razgrad	Minyor Stadium
		report	Ivanov 10'; Stoyanov 31', 36', 38'; Kašćelan 59'; Bakalov 64'; Kostadinov 84'	Attendance: 190

22 April 2012 25	Ludogorets Razgrad	1–1	Litex Lovech	Ludogorets Arena
	Genchev 80'	report	Tsvetanov 75'	Attendance: 5,900

28 April 2012 26	Montana	1–4	Ludogorets Razgrad	Ogosta Stadium
	Vodenicharov 71'	report	Gargorov 14'; Stoyanov 21', 73'; Aleksandrov 80'	Attendance: 1,000

6 May 2012 27	Lokomotiv Sofia	0–1	Ludogorets Razgrad	Vasil Levski National Stadium
	Mladenov (yellow card) 37' (yellow-red card) 45+2'	Summary	Gargorov 33'	Attendance: 470

12 May 2012 28	Ludogorets Razgrad	3–1	Chernomorets Burgas	Ludogorets Arena
	Stoyanov 31', 39'; Gargorov 65'	report	Dyakov 4'; Palankov (red card) 75'	Attendance: 4,500

19 May 2012 29	Kaliakra Kavarna	0–4	Ludogorets Razgrad	Kavarna Stadium
		Summary	Dyakov 20'; Stoyanov 60'; Gargorov 64'; Marcelinho 75'	Attendance: 380

23 May 2012 30	Ludogorets Razgrad	1–0	CSKA Sofia	Ludogorets Arena
	Ivanov 19'; Dyakov (yellow card) 44' (yellow-red card) 58'	Summary	Granchov (red card) 45'	Attendance: 6,000

=== Bulgarian Cup ===
23 November 2011 Second round	Beroe Stara Zagora	0–1 (a.e.t.)	Ludogorets Razgrad	Stara Zagora
18:00 EET (UTC+2)	Zhekov (yellow card) 30'; Chipilov (yellow card) 37'; Yamukov (yellow card) 43'; Penev (yellow card) 110'	Report	Ivanov 104'	Stadium: Beroe Stadium; Referee: Blagoy Marinov

3 December 2011 Third round	Ludogorets Razgrad	5–1	Svetkavitsa	Razgrad
13:00 EET (UTC+2)	Genchev 15'; Marcelinho 45+1'; Gargorov 61'; Kabasele 68'; Stoyanov 72'	Report	Kanev 75'	Stadium: Ludogorets Arena; Attendance: 5,500; Referee: Hristo Ristoskov

14 March 2012 Quarterfinal	Botev Plovdiv	0–3	Ludogorets Razgrad	Plovdiv
14:30 EET (UTC+2)	Petrov (yellow card) 34'; P.Atanasov (yellow card) 38'; A.Aleksandrov (yellow card) 43'; Dimitrov (yellow card) 61'; Bonev (red card) 67'	Report	Marcelinho 21' (yellow card) 45+3'; Stoyanov (yellow card) 38'; Aleksandrov 76'; Kabasele 88'	Stadium: Hristo Botev Stadium; Referee: Stefan Spasov

11 April 2012 Semifinal	Septemvri Simitli	1–4	Ludogorets Razgrad	Simitli
16:00 EET (UTC+2)	Koemdzhiev (yellow card) 13'; I.Baltov (yellow card) 15'; A.Todorov (yellow card) 16'; Mäntylä 60' (o.g.); Mihaylov (yellow card) 80'	Report	Genchev (yellow card) 2'; Stoyanov 36', 76'; Kabasele 48'; Kašćelan (yellow card) 66'; Aleksandrov 78'	Stadium: Struma; Referee: Stefan Spasov

==== Final ====
16 May 2012 Final	Lokomotiv Plovdiv	1–2	Ludogorets Razgrad	Burgas
16:00 EET (UTC+2)	Dakson 18'; Lazarov (yellow card) 67'; Serginho (yellow card) 69'; Rodrigues (yellow card) 78'; Bengelloun (red card) 90+4'	Report	Guldan (yellow card) 27'; Ivanov (yellow card) 45+3'; Marcelinho 76', 83'; Minev (yellow card) 86'	Stadium: Lazur Stadium; Referee: Stanislav Todorov

== Squad statistics ==
As of match played 23 May 2012

=== Appearances and goals ===
No.	Pos	Nat	Player	Total		A PFG		Bulgarian Cup	
No.	Pos	Nat	Player	Apps	Goals	Apps	Goals	Apps	Goals
1	GK	(Serbia) SRB	Uroš Golubović	33	0	28	0	5	0
3	DF	(Slovakia) SVK	Marián Jarabica	1	0	0+1	0	0	0
4	DF	(Finland) FIN	Tero Mäntylä	4	0	3	0	0+1	0
5	DF	(France) FRA	Alexandre Barthe	32	3	29	3	3	0
6	MF	(Bulgaria) BUL	Georgi Kostadinov	5	2	0+5	2	0+0	0
7	MF	(Bulgaria) BUL	Mihail Aleksandrov	32	7	17+11	5	2+2	2
8	MF	(Bulgaria) BUL	Stanislav Genchev	32	7	27	6	5	1
11	FW	(Brazil) BRA	Juninho Quixadá	12	5	1+10	5	0+1	0
13	GK	(Czech Republic) CZE	Radek Petr	2	0	2	0	0	0
18	MF	(Bulgaria) BUL	Svetoslav Dyakov	34	1	29	1	5	0
19	FW	(Bulgaria) BUL	Dimo Bakalov	17	2	9+5	2	1+2	0
20	DF	(Brazil) BRA	Choco	32	1	25+2	1	4+1	0
22	MF	(Bulgaria) BUL	Miroslav Ivanov	31	5	23+4	4	3+1	1
23	MF	(Bulgaria) BUL	Emil Gargorov	30	14	26	13	4	1
25	DF	(Bulgaria) BUL	Yordan Minev	33	0	28	0	5	0
27	FW	(Belgium) BEL	Christian Kabasele	15	6	1+10	3	2+2	3
33	DF	(Slovakia) SVK	Ľubomír Guldan	33	0	28	0	5	0
36	MF	(Montenegro) MNE	Mladen Kašćelan	13	1	3+8	1	1+1	0
73	MF	(Bulgaria) BUL	Ivan Stoyanov	30	19	17+8	16	4+1	3
77	DF	(Portugal) POR	Vitinha	11	0	5+5	0	1	0
84	MF	(Brazil) BRA	Marcelinho	30	13	23+2	9	4+1	4
Players who appeared for Ludogorets Razgrad no longer at the club:
4	DF	(Slovenia) SLO	Jure Travner	4	0	1+2	0	1	0
6	MF	(Bulgaria) BUL	Nikolay Dyulgerov	2	0	0+2	0	0	0
10	FW	(Bulgaria) BUL	Todor Kolev	10	1	3+6	1	0+1	0
21	MF	(Bulgaria) BUL	Dimo Atanasov	6	0	1+5	0	0	0
77	DF	(Bosnia and Herzegovina) BIH	Suvad Grabus	1	0	1	0	0	0

=== Goal scorers ===
Place	Position	Nation	Number	Name	A PFG	Bulgarian Cup	Total
1	MF	(Bulgaria)	73	Ivan Stoyanov	16	3	19
2	MF	(Bulgaria)	23	Emil Gargorov	13	1	14
3	MF	(Brazil)	84	Marcelinho	9	4	13
4	MF	(Bulgaria)	8	Stanislav Genchev	6	1	7
4	MF	(Bulgaria)	7	Mihail Aleksandrov	5	2	7
6	FW	(Belgium)	27	Christian Kabasele	3	3	6
7	MF	(Brazil)	11	Juninho Quixadá	5	0	5
7	MF	(Bulgaria)	22	Miroslav Ivanov	4	1	5
9	DF	(France)	5	Alexandre Barthe	3	0	3
10	FW	(Bulgaria)	19	Dimo Bakalov	2	0	2
10	MF	(Bulgaria)	6	Georgi Kostadinov	2	0	2
12	MF	(Bulgaria)	10	Todor Kolev	1	0	1
12	DF	(Brazil)	20	Choco	1	0	1
12	MF	(Montenegro)	36	Mladen Kašćelan	1	0	1
12	MF	(Bulgaria)	18	Svetoslav Dyakov	1	0	1
12				Own goal	1	0	1
				TOTALS	73	15	88

=== Disciplinary record ===
Number	Nation	Position	Name	A PFG		Bulgarian Cup		Total	
Number	Nation	Position	Name	Yellow card	Red card	Yellow card	Red card	Yellow card	Red card
1	(Serbia)	GK	Uroš Golubović	3	1	0	0	3	1
5	(France)	DF	Alexandre Barthe	11	0	0	0	11	0
7	(Bulgaria)	MF	Mihail Aleksandrov	3	0	0	0	3	0
8	(Bulgaria)	MF	Stanislav Genchev	4	0	1	0	5	0
10	(Bulgaria)	FW	Todor Kolev	1	0	0	0	1	0
11	(Brazil)	FW	Juninho Quixadá	1	0	0	0	1	0
18	(Bulgaria)	MF	Svetoslav Dyakov	7	1	0	0	7	1
19	(Bulgaria)	FW	Dimo Bakalov	2	0	0	0	2	0
20	(Brazil)	DF	Choco	6	0	0	0	6	0
22	(Bulgaria)	MF	Miroslav Ivanov	7	0	1	0	8	0
23	(Bulgaria)	MF	Emil Gargorov	4	0	0	0	4	0
25	(Bulgaria)	DF	Yordan Minev	8	1	1	0	9	1
27	(Belgium)	FW	Christian Kabasele	3	0	0	0	3	0
33	(Slovakia)	DF	Ľubomír Guldan	2	0	1	0	3	0
36	(Montenegro)	MF	Mladen Kašćelan	3	0	1	0	4	0
73	(Bulgaria)	MF	Ivan Stoyanov	3	0	1	0	4	0
77	(Portugal)	DF	Vitinha	4	0	0	0	4	0
84	(Brazil)	MF	Marcelinho	7	0	1	0	8	0
Players who left Ludogorets Razgrad during the season:
4	(Slovenia)	DF	Jure Travner	1	0	0	0	1	0
			TOTALS	80	3	7	0	87	3
