= 2011–12 A Group =

88th season of top-tier football league in Bulgaria

A Group
- Season: 2011–12
- Dates: 6 August 2011 – 23 May 2012
- Champions: Ludogorets Razgrad (1st title)
- Relegated: Vidima-Rakovski, Kaliakra, Svetkavitsa
- Champions League: Ludogorets Razgrad
- Europa League: CSKA Sofia; Levski Sofia; Lokomotiv Plovdiv
- Matches: 240
- Goals: 643 (2.68 per match)
- Top goalscorer: (Brazil) Junior Moraes; Ivan Stoyanov (16 goals each)
- Biggest home win: Levski 7–0 Svetkavitsa
- Biggest away win: Minyor 0–7 Ludogorets
- Highest scoring: Cherno More 7–1 Kaliakra; Botev 6–2 Kaliakra; Litex 6–2 Lokomotiv

The 2011–12 A Group was the 88th season of the Bulgarian national top football division, and the 64th of A Group as the top tier football league in the country. The season began on 6 August 2011 and ended on 23 May 2012. Ludogorets Razgrad claimed their maiden title in their debut season, after winning the last round clash against CSKA, which were leading by 2 points prior to the match. Vidima-Rakovski, Kaliakra and Svetkavitsa were relegated, after finishing at the bottom three places.

== Team information ==
Akademik Sofia and Sliven were directly relegated after finishing in the bottom two places of the table at the end of season 2010/11. Akademik were relegated after one year in the top league of Bulgarian football, while Sliven ended a three-year tenure in the top flight. Furthermore, Pirin (Blagoevgrad) were excluded from A Group due to financial difficulties and demoted to V Group.

The relegated teams were replaced by Botev Vratsa, champions of West B Group, Ludogorets Razgrad, champions of East B Group and promotion play-off winners Svetkavitsa. Botev Vratsa returned to A Group after twenty-two years, while Ludogorets Razgrad and Svetkavitsa both made their debut on the highest level of Bulgarian football.

There was some controversy regarding the relegation/promotion play-offs at the end of season 2010/11. In the original match-up, 14th-placed Vidima-Rakovski lost 3-0 against B Group play-off winners Chernomorets (Pomorie). However, Pomorie did not receive an A Group licence, so Vidima-Rakovski were spared from relegation. In order to fill the void, a second play-off match was scheduled between Svetkavitsa, 4th-placed team of East B Group, and Etar (Veliko Tarnovo), 3rd-placed team of West B Group. Svetkavitsa won this match by a score of 3-1.

=== Stadia and locations ===
As in the previous year, the league comprises the best thirteen teams of season 2010-11, the champions of the two B Groups and the winners of the promotion play-offs.

Location of teams in 2011–12 A Group
Sofia 2011–12 A Group football clubs

Team	Location	Stadium	Capacity
Beroe	Stara Zagora	Beroe	17,800
Botev	Vratsa	Hristo Botev	32,000
Cherno More	Varna	Ticha	8,250
Chernomorets	Burgas	Lazur	18,037
CSKA	Sofia	Balgarska Armiya	22,015
Kaliakra	Kavarna	Kavarna	5,000
Levski	Sofia	Georgi Asparuhov	29,200
Litex	Lovech	Lovech	7,050
Lokomotiv	Plovdiv	Lokomotiv	13,800
Lokomotiv	Sofia	Lokomotiv Sofia^{1}	22,000
Ludogorets	Razgrad	Ludogorets Arena	6,000
Minyor	Pernik	Minyor	8,000
Montana	Montana	Ogosta	8,000
Slavia	Sofia	Ovcha Kupel	18,000
Svetkavitsa	Targovishte	Dimitar Burkov	8,000
Vidima-Rakovski	Sevlievo	Rakovski	8,816

Notes

1. Lokomotiv Sofia play their home matches at Vasil Levski National Stadium as their own ground, Lokomotiv Stadium, had not received approval from the BFU license committee.

=== Personnel and sponsoring ===
Team	Manager	Captain	Kit Manufacturer	Shirt Sponsor
Beroe Stara Zagora	(Bulgaria) Ilian Iliev	(Bulgaria) Slavi Zhekov	Uhlsport	Bulsatcom
Botev Vratsa	(Bulgaria) Sasho Angelov	(Bulgaria) Rosen Vankov	Jumper	
Cherno More Varna	(Bulgaria) Stefan Genov	(Bulgaria) Georgi Iliev	Misho	Armeets
Chernomorets Burgas	(Bulgaria) Dimitar Dimitrov	(Bulgaria) Radostin Kishishev	Macron	
CSKA Sofia	(Bulgaria) Dimitar Penev	(Bulgaria) Todor Yanchev	Kappa	GLOBUL
Kaliakra	(Bulgaria) Radostin Trifonov	(Bulgaria) Ivan Raychev	Uhlsport	Municipality of Kavarna
Levski Sofia	(Bulgaria) Nikolay Kostov	(Bulgaria) Hristo Yovov	Nike	VTB Bank
Litex Lovech	(Bulgaria) Atanas Dzhambazki	(Serbia) Nebojša Jelenković	adidas	b-connect
Lokomotiv Plovdiv	(Bulgaria) Emil Velev	(Bulgaria) Zdravko Lazarov	Uhlsport	Refan
Lokomotiv Sofia	(Bulgaria) Anton Velkov	(Bulgaria) Kristian Dobrev	Puma	
Ludogorets Razgrad	(Bulgaria) Ivaylo Petev	(Bulgaria) Todor Kolev	adidas	Huvepharma
Minyor Pernik	(Bulgaria) Stoycho Stoev	(Bulgaria) Kostadin Markov	Jumper	Municipal Insurance Company
Montana	(Bulgaria) Stefan Grozdanov	(Bulgaria) Daniel Gadzhev	Jako	GM Capital
Slavia Sofia	(Bulgaria) Martin Kushev	(Bulgaria) Bogomil Dyakov	Puma	
Svetkavitsa	(Bulgaria) Nikola Spasov	(Bulgaria) Georgi Damyanov	Jako	Vinprom Targovishte
Vidima-Rakovski	(Bulgaria) Kostadin Angelov	(Bulgaria) Georgi Stoychev	Asics	VIDEXIM

=== Managerial changes ===
Team	Outgoing manager(s)	Manner of departure	Date of vacancy	Position in table	Replaced by	Date of appointment
Levski Sofia	(Bulgaria) Yasen Petrov	End of contract	27 May 2011	Pre-season	(Bulgaria) Georgi Ivanov	27 May 2011
Slavia Sofia	(Bulgaria) Emil Velev	Sacked	28 May 2011	Pre-season	(Bulgaria) Martin Kushev	28 May 2011
Kaliakra Kavarna	(Bulgaria) Antoni Zdravkov	End of contract	28 May 2011	Pre-season	(Bulgaria) Adalbert Zafirov	28 May 2011
Chernomorets Burgas	(Bulgaria) Georgi Vasilev	Sacked	30 May 2011	Pre-season	(Bulgaria) Dimitar Dimitrov	30 May 2011
Montana	(Bulgaria) Atanas Dzhambazki	End of contract	2 June 2011	Pre-season	(Bulgaria) Stefan Grozdanov	11 June 2011
Lokomotiv Plovdiv	(Serbia) Saša Nikolić	Sacked	14 June 2011	Pre-season	(North Macedonia) Dragan Kanatlarovski	17 June 2011
Vidima-Rakovski	(Bulgaria) Dimitar Todorov	Sacked	16 June 2011	Pre-season	(Bulgaria) Kostadin Angelov	17 June 2011
Lokomotiv Sofia	(Bulgaria) Dian Petkov	Sacked	3 October 2011	10th	(Bulgaria) Anton Velkov	3 October 2011
Kaliakra Kavarna	(Bulgaria) Adalbert Zafirov	Sacked	19 October 2011	15th	(Bulgaria) Radostin Trifonov	19 October 2011
Svetkavitsa Targovishte	(Bulgaria) Plamen Donev	Resigned	19 October 2011	16th	(Bulgaria) Nikola Spasov	23 October 2011
Litex Lovech	(Bulgaria) Lyuboslav Penev	Resigned	24 October 2011	5th	(Bulgaria) Atanas Dzhambazki	24 October 2011
CSKA Sofia	(Bulgaria) Milen Radukanov	Sacked	25 October 2011	2nd	(Bulgaria) Dimitar Penev	25 October 2011
Levski Sofia	(Bulgaria) Georgi Ivanov	Resigned	4 November 2011	5th	(Bulgaria) Nikolay Kostov	7 November 2011
Lokomotiv Plovdiv	(North Macedonia) Dragan Kanatlarovski	Sacked	7 November 2011	6th	(Bulgaria) Emil Velev	8 November 2011
Levski Sofia	(Bulgaria) Nikolay Kostov	Resigned	26 March 2012	4th	(Bulgaria) Georgi Ivanov (caretaker)	March 2012

Note: Georgi Ivanov subsequently stepped down and was replaced by Yasen Petrov as caretaker manager at the helm of Levski, with Ilian Iliev set to take over prior to the 2012/2013 season.

== League table ==
Pos	Team	Pld	W	D	L	GF	GA	GD	Pts	Qualification or relegation
1	Ludogorets Razgrad (C)	30	22	4	4	73	16	+57	70	Qualification for Champions League second qualifying round
2	CSKA Sofia	30	22	3	5	60	19	+41	69	Qualification for Europa League second qualifying round
3	Levski Sofia	30	20	2	8	61	28	+33	62	Qualification for Europa League second qualifying round
4	Chernomorets Burgas	30	17	9	4	57	23	+34	60	
5	Litex Lovech	30	17	8	5	57	28	+29	59	
6	Lokomotiv Plovdiv	30	17	6	7	44	39	+5	57	Qualification for Europa League second qualifying round (Note: Ludogorets Razgrad won the 2011–12 Bulgarian Cup competition but were qualified for 2012–13 UEFA Champions League via winning the league, hence their Europa League berth was awarded to the cup runners-up, Lokomotiv Plovdiv.)
7	Cherno More	30	16	4	10	46	25	+21	52	
8	Slavia Sofia	30	15	6	9	42	36	+6	51	
9	Minyor Pernik	30	8	12	10	35	40	−5	36	
10	Beroe	30	9	8	13	30	37	−7	35	
11	Montana	30	8	7	15	29	51	−22	31	
12	Botev Vratsa	30	7	8	15	30	44	−14	29	
13	Lokomotiv Sofia	30	5	9	16	26	50	−24	24	
14	Vidima-Rakovski (R)	30	3	6	21	19	59	−40	15	Relegation to 2012–13 B Group
15	Kaliakra (R)	30	2	5	23	26	77	−51	11	Relegation to 2012–13 B Group
16	Svetkavitsa (R)	30	1	5	24	8	71	−63	8	Relegation to 2012–13 B Group

Source: A PFG (in Bulgarian)
Rules for classification: 1st points; 2nd head-to-head points; 3rd head-to-head goal difference; 4th head-to-head goals scored; 5th head-to-head away goals scored; 6th goal difference; 7th goals scored
(C) Champions; (R) Relegated

== Results ==
Home \ Away	BSZ	BVR	CHM	CHB	CSK	KAV	LEV	LIT	LPL	LSO	LUD	MIN	MON	SLA	SVE	VRA
Beroe		1–2	2–0	1–2	0–1	3–1	1–2	1–1	1–1	1–0	1–2	0–0	2–0	1–0	2–0	1–0
Botev Vratsa	1–1		0–1	0–0	2–2	6–2	0–2	1–3	1–1	2–0	0–1	0–0	2–4	0–1	1–0	2–2
Cherno More	2–0	1–0		0–2	0–0	7–1	3–1	0–1	1–2	3–0	0–1	2–0	2–0	2–0	1–0	2–1
Chernomorets Burgas	2–2	3–1	3–2		2–0	1–0	2–0	1–1	2–0	1–1	0–0	1–0	2–0	2–3	6–0	4–0
CSKA Sofia	1–0	2–0	4–1	1–0		3–1	1–0	4–1	3–0	4–0	2–2	3–1	2–0	1–2	3–0	4–1
Kaliakra	3–1	0–0	0–5	0–4	1–2		1–4	0–2	1–2	0–0	0–4	2–2	2–3	1–2	1–1	3–2
Levski Sofia	2–0	3–0	2–1	2–2	1–0	3–2		3–2	3–2	4–0	0–1	0–1	1–0	1–0	7–0	2–1
Litex Lovech	2–1	3–1	1–0	0–0	0–2	5–0	1–0		6–2	2–0	2–1	2–2	0–0	1–0	6–0	3–0
Lokomotiv Plovdiv	4–2	2–1	1–0	2–0	0–3	2–0	3–2	2–1		2–1	1–0	1–1	1–0	2–1	2–0	3–2
Lokomotiv Sofia	3–0	0–1	0–0	0–4	1–2	3–2	1–1	1–2	2–0		0–1	1–1	1–1	0–3 (Note: The match between Lokomotiv Sofia and Slavia Sofia was awarded to Slavia by a score of 3–0. The original fixture was not played after police security for the match could not be provided.)	4–1	0–1
Ludogorets Razgrad	3–0	3–0	0–2	3–1	1–0	2–0	2–1	1–1	0–0	4–0		4–1	3–0	6–0	5–0	4–0
Minyor Pernik	1–1	1–3	0–1	1–1	2–0	1–1	0–1	2–2	0–0	1–2	0–7		3–1	1–1	3–0	1–0
Montana	0–0	2–0	1–3	2–4	0–5	2–1	0–3	1–0	2–2	1–1	1–4	1–2		1–2	0–0	1–0
Slavia Sofia	0–0	3–2	1–1	1–1	0–1	3–0	0–3	0–2	3–0	2–1	3–2	2–1	1–1		2–0	1–1
Svetkavitsa	1–3	0–0	1–3	0–3	0–3	1–0	0–1	1–3	0–1	1–1	0–1	0–3	1–2	0–3		0–0
Vidima-Rakovski	0–1	0–1	0–0	0–1	0–1	1–0	1–6	1–1	0–3	2–2	0–5	0–3	1–2	1–2	1–0	

Source: A PFG (in Bulgarian)
Legend: Blue = home team win; Yellow = draw; Red = away team win.

== Champions ==
Ludogorets Razgrad

Goalkeepers
1	(Serbia) Uroš Golubović	28	(0)
13	(Czech Republic) Radek Petr	2	(0)
30	(Bulgaria) Georgi Argilashki	0	(0)
	(Bulgaria) Emil Mihaylov*	0	(0)

Defenders
3	(Slovakia) Marián Jarabica	1	(0)
4	(Finland) Tero Mäntylä	3	(0)
5	(France) Alexandre Barthe	29	(3)
20	(Brazil) Guilherme Choco	27	(1)
25	(Bulgaria) Yordan Minev	28	(0)
26	(Bulgaria) Diyan Dimitrov	0	(0)
33	(Slovakia) Ľubomír Guldan	28	(0)
77	(Portugal) Vitinha	10	(0)
	(Slovenia) Jure Travner*	3	(0)
	(Bosnia and Herzegovina) Suvad Grabus*	1	(0)

Midfielders
6	(Bulgaria) Georgi Kostadinov	5	(2)
7	(Bulgaria) Mihail Aleksandrov	28	(5)
8	(Bulgaria) Stanislav Genchev	27	(6)
18	(Bulgaria) Svetoslav Dyakov	29	(1)
19	(Bulgaria) Dimo Bakalov	14	(2)
22	(Bulgaria) Miroslav Ivanov	27	(4)
36	(Montenegro) Mladen Kašćelan	11	(1)
84	(Brazil) Marcelinho	25	(9)
	(Bulgaria) Shener Remzi*	0	(0)
	(Bulgaria) Dimo Atanasov*	6	(0)
	(Bulgaria) Nikolay Dyulgerov*	2	(0)

Forwards
11	(Brazil) Juninho Quixadá	11	(5)
23	(Bulgaria) Emil Gargorov	26	(13)
27	(Belgium) Christian Kabasele	11	(3)
73	(Bulgaria) Ivan Stoyanov	25	(16)
	(Bulgaria) Todor Kolev*	9	(1)

Manager
(Bulgaria) Ivaylo Petev

- Mihaylov, Travner, Grabus, Remzi, Atanasov, Dyulgerov and Kolev left the club during a season.

== Season statistics ==
=== Top goalscorers ===
Below is a list of the top goalscorers at the end of the competition.

Rank	Scorer	Club	Goals
1	(Brazil) Júnior Moraes	CSKA Sofia	16
1	(Bulgaria) Ivan Stoyanov	Ludogorets Razgrad	16
3	(Bulgaria) Emil Gargorov	Ludogorets Razgrad	13
3	(Romania) Ianis Zicu	CSKA Sofia	13
5	(Brazil) Juninho	Slavia Sofia / Levski Sofia	12
6	(Bulgaria) Svetoslav Todorov	Litex Lovech	11
6	(Bulgaria) Ivan Tsvetkov	Levski Sofia	11
6	(Bulgaria) Gerasim Zakov	Kaliakra Kavarna	11
9	(Brazil) Lourival Assis	Chernomorets Burgas	10
9	(Morocco) Aatif Chahechouhe	Chernomorets Burgas	10
9	(Bulgaria) Georgi Iliev	Cherno More Varna	10
9	(Brazil) Marcelo Nicácio	Litex Lovech	10

=== Scoring ===
- First goal of the season: 19:08 – Georgi Bozhilov for Cherno More against Montana (6 August 2011)
- Fastest goal of the season: 6 seconds – Miroslav Manolov (Cherno More) against Montana (22 March 2012)

== Transfers ==
- List of Bulgarian football transfers summer 2011
- List of Bulgarian football transfers winter 2011–12

== Attendances ==
No.	Club	Average	Highest
1	CSKA Sofia	4,227	8,800
2	Ludogorets	3,919	6,000
3	Beroe	3,559	7,000
4	Levski	3,133	15,000
5	Botev	2,937	8,000
6	Chernomorets	2,619	8,900
7	Lokomotiv Plovdiv	2,589	7,200
8	Cherno More	2,355	8,780
9	Svetkavista	1,818	5,400
10	Montana	1,597	5,000
11	Lovech	1,550	7,000
12	Minyor	1,481	3,900
13	Vidima-Rakovski	547	1,300
14	Slavia Sofia	532	2,300
15	Lokomotiv Sofia	505	2,370
16	Kaliakra	499	1,680
