= Franco Bano =

Argentine footballer

Personal information
- Full name: Franco Antonio Bano
- Date of birth: 30 March 1986 (age 40)
- Place of birth: La Plata, Argentina
- Height: 1.90 m (6 ft 3 in)
- Position: Centre back

Senior career*
Years	Team	Apps	(Gls)
2005–2007	Estudiantes de La Plata	?	(?)
2007–2008	Tiro Federal	?	(?)
2008–2011	Miramar Misiones	42	(4)
2011–2012	Ludogorets Razgrad	0	(0)
2012–2013	Atenas	25	(1)
2013–2014	AEK Kouklia	24	(1)
- * Club domestic league appearances and goals as of 19 October 2013

Franco Antonio Bano (born 30 March 1986 in La Plata) is an Argentinian professional footballer who last played for AEK Kouklia in the Cypriot First Division. He has previously played in his homeland for Tiro Federal and Miramar Misiones in Uruguay.

== Career ==
Bano arrived Miramar Misiones in mid 2008 to play in the Uruguayan Second Level. He scored his first goal with the club on 4 October 2008 against Progreso.

In mid 2010, he achieved with the club the promotion to the Uruguayan Top Level after winning Juventud in the Second Promotion Playoff finals.

During Miramar Misiones's 2010–11 season, Bano made 18 appearances in the Uruguayan Primera División, in which was sent off 3 times.

After playing for Miramar for three years, he joined Bulgarian side Ludogorets Razgrad at the beginning of the A PFG 2011–12 season.

In September 2012, Bano signed a new deal with Uruguayan side Atenas de San Carlos.

On 23 July 2013, he signed a contract with Cypriot side AEK Kouklia.
