= Choco (footballer, born 18 January 1990) =

Brazilian footballer

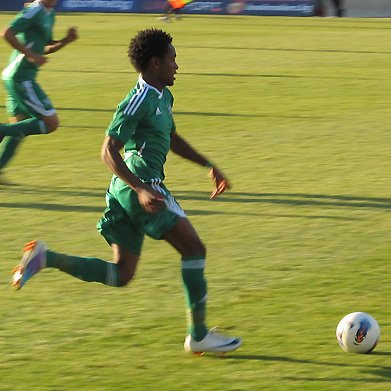
- Choco playing for Ludogorets Razgrad in 2011

Personal information
- Full name: Guilherme de Souza
- Date of birth: 18 January 1990 (age 36)
- Place of birth: São Paulo, Brazil
- Height: 1.73 m (5 ft 8 in)
- Position: Right-back

Team information
- Current team: Laguna

Youth career
- Corinthians
- São Paulo
- Santos

Senior career*
Years	Team	Apps	(Gls)
2009–2010	Santos	0	(0)
2010	→ Red Bull Brasil (loan)		
2011–2014	Ludogorets Razgrad	71	(2)
2015–2016	APOEL	0	(0)
2016	→ Sampaio Corrêa (loan)	2	(0)
2016	→ AO Itabaiana (loan)	7	(0)
2016	Montana	18	(0)
2017	Lokomotiv Plovdiv	7	(0)
2017	Sūduva	6	(0)
2018	Juventude	10	(0)
2019	Ituano	1	(0)
2019–2020	Lokomotiv Sofia	14	(4)
2020	Ludogorets Razgrad II	13	(0)
2021	Kauno Žalgiris	36	(0)
2022	Riteriai	24	(0)
2023	Ipatinga	3	(0)
2023–2024	União Luziense		
2025–	Laguna	11	(0)
- * Club domestic league appearances and goals as of 6 April 2025

Guilherme de Souza (born 18 January 1990), commonly known as Choco, is a Brazilian footballer. He normally plays in the right-back position, but can also play on the right side of midfield.

== Career ==
=== Ludogorets Razgrad ===
Choco went through the youth academy of Santos Futebol Clube. On 7 January 2011, he moved from Santos to Bulgarian side Ludogorets Razgrad, signing a three-and-a-half-year contract and becoming the team's first foreign signing of the Domuschiev era.

Choco scored his first goal for Ludogorets on 15 October 2011, netting the second goal in a 4–1 home win over Minyor Pernik. He was primarily a starter during the 2011–12 season, being a key part of Petev's team that won its first top division title, but made only very sporadic appearances over the course of the 2012–13 championship. He continued to feature only on rare occasions during the 2013–14 (though he did play a part in the 2013–14 UEFA Europa League group stage, appearing in three of their victories) and 2014–15 campaigns (not being registered for the 2014–15 UEFA Champions League group stage). Choco left the team by mutual consent at the end of November 2014. He stated that Ludogorets will always remain in his heart.

Following his release from Ludogorets, Choco attracted interest from the Kazakhstan Premier League, but eventually he didn't complete any move there.

=== APOEL ===
On 27 May 2015, Choco signed a two-year contract, with the option of a further season with APOEL from Cyprus. His contract with APOEL was terminated in December 2015, leaving the team after only seven months and without managing to appear in any official match.

=== Sampaio Corrêa ===
On 23 December 2015, he moved back to his country and signed a contract with the Campeonato Brasileiro Série B club Sampaio Corrêa.

=== Lokomotiv Plovdiv ===
On 19 December 2016, Choco signed with Bulgarian First League club Lokomotiv Plovdiv. In May 2017, his contract was terminated by mutual consent.

=== Sūduva Marijampolė ===
On 5 September 2017, Choco signed with A Lyga club Sūduva Marijampolė.

=== Return to Ludogorets ===
In July 2020 Choco returned to Ludogorets, but this time he signed with their double – Ludogorets Razgrad II, to help the young players.

=== FK Kauno Žalgiris ===
In January 2021 he returned to Lithuania and became a member of FK Kauno Žalgiris.

== Career statistics ==
As of 17 October 2014

Club	Season	League			National Cup		Continental (Note: Includes UEFA Champions League and UEFA Europa League matches.)		Other (Note: Includes Bulgarian Supercup and Cypriot Super Cup matches.)		Total	
Club	Season	Division	Apps	Goals	Apps	Goals	Apps	Goals	Apps	Goals	Apps	Goals
Ludogorets	2010–11	B Group	10	0	0	0	—		—		10	0
Ludogorets	2011–12	A Group	27	1	5	0	—		—		32	1
Ludogorets	2012–13	A Group	6	0	1	0	0	0	0	0	7	0
Ludogorets	2013–14	A Group	23	1	5	0	4	0	0	0	32	1
Ludogorets	2014–15	A Group	5	0	1	0	1	0	0	0	7	0
Ludogorets	Total		71	2	12	0	5	0	0	0	88	2
APOEL	2015–16	First Division	0	0	0	0	0	0	0	0	0	0
APOEL	Total		0	0	0	0	0	0	0	0	0	0
Career total			71	2	12	0	5	0	0	0	88	2

== International career ==
On 26 October 2011, Choco received a Bulgarian passport and potentially became able to play for Bulgaria.

== Honours ==
=== Club ===
Ludogorets

- Bulgarian A Group: 2011–12, 2012–13, 2013–14
- Bulgarian Cup: 2011–12, 2013–14
- Bulgarian Supercup: 2012, 2014

Sūduva

- A Lyga: 2017
