= Vitinha (footballer, born 1986) =

Portuguese footballer

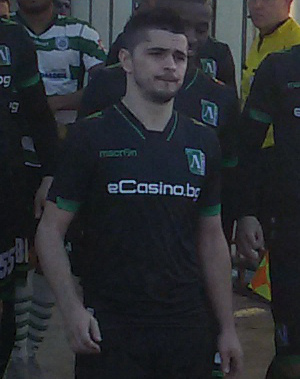
- Vitinha before a game with Ludogorets in 2015

Personal information
- Full name: Vítor Tiago de Freitas Fernandes
- Date of birth: 11 February 1986 (age 40)
- Place of birth: São Torcato, Portugal
- Height: 1.73 m (5 ft 8 in)
- Position: Left back

Youth career
- 1997–2005: Vitória Guimarães
- 2001–2002: → Amigos Urgeses (loan)

Senior career*
Years	Team	Apps	(Gls)
2005–2006	Torcatense	24	(1)
2006	Maria Fonte	12	(0)
2007–2011	CFR Cluj	2	(0)
2008–2009	→ Otopeni (loan)	27	(2)
2009–2010	→ Unirea Alba Iulia (loan)	13	(0)
2010–2011	→ Otopeni (loan)	12	(0)
2011	Concordia Chiajna	14	(1)
2012–2017	Ludogorets Razgrad	42	(0)
2015–2017	Ludogorets II	10	(1)
2017–2018	Cherno More	1	(0)
2018	Unirea Alba Iulia	9	(0)
2019–2026	Metalurgistul Cugir	139	(9)
Total		303	(14)

International career
2002	Portugal U17	1	(0)
2006	Portugal U20	2	(0)
- * Club domestic league appearances and goals as of 12:23, 25 December 2024 (UTC)

Vítor Tiago de Freitas Fernandes (born 11 February 1986), commonly known as Vitinha, is a Portuguese former footballer who played as a left back.

He spent his entire professional career in Romania and Bulgaria, mainly at the service of Ludogorets in the latter case.

== Club career ==
Born in São Torcato, Guimarães, Vitinha only played lower league football in his homeland. In January 2007 he signed with Romanian club CFR Cluj, and in the ensuing summer he started a series of loans in the latter country, representing in quick succession CS Otopeni (two spells), FC Unirea Alba Iulia and CS Concordia Chiajna; he appeared for all the teams in Liga I, scoring two goals in a combined 44 matches.

In the 2012 winter transfer window, Vitinha joined PFC Ludogorets Razgrad in the First Professional Football League (Bulgaria). He made his competitive debut on 3 March, coming on as a late substitute in a 3–0 home win against PFC Beroe Stara Zagora.

Vitinha was second-choice left-back as the Eagles won five consecutive national championships starting in 2012, mainly being understudy to veteran Yordan Minev. His maiden appearance in the UEFA Champions League took place on 6 August 2013, as he played five minutes in a 1–0 away win over FK Partizan for the third qualifying round.

On 16 June 2017, Vitinha signed with PFC Cherno More Varna also in the Bulgarian top division. He made his debut on 11 August in a 1–1 home draw against PFC Slavia Sofia, suffering an achilles tendon rupture in the beginning of the second half and going on to be sidelined for several months.

Vitinha returned to Romania subsequently, where he represented Unirea and CF Metalurgistul Cugir.

== Club statistics ==
As of 28 May 2018

Club	Season	League			Cup		Other		Total	
Club	Season	Division	Apps	Goals	Apps	Goals	Apps	Goals	Apps	Goals
Torcatense	2005–06	Second Division	21	1	—		—		21	1
Maria Fonte	2006–07	Second Division	12	0	2	0	—		14	0
CFR Cluj	2006–07	Liga I	2	0			—		2	0
CFR Cluj	2007–08	Liga I	0	0			—		0	0
CFR Cluj	Total		2	0			—		2	0
Otopeni (loan)	2007–08	Liga II	12	1			—		12	1
Otopeni (loan)	2008–09	Liga I	14	1			—		14	1
Otopeni (loan)	Total		26	2			—		26	2
Unirea Alba (loan)	2009–10	Liga I	14	0			—		14	0
Otopeni (loan)	2010–11	Liga II	12	0			—		12	0
Concordia	2011–12	Liga I	14	1	0	0	—		14	1
Ludogorets	2011–12	A Group	10	0	1	0	—		11	0
Ludogorets	2012–13	A Group	4	0	0	0	—		4	0
Ludogorets	2013–14	A Group	9	0	5	0	2 (Note: Appearances in UEFA Champions League)	0	16	0
Ludogorets	2014–15	A Group	3	0	2	0	1	0	6	0
Ludogorets	2015–16	A Group	12	0	1	0	0	0	13	0
Ludogorets	2016–17	First League	4	0	1	0	1	0	6	0
Ludogorets	Total		42	0	10	0	4	0	56	0
Cherno More	2017–18	First League	1	0	0	0	—		1	0
Cherno More	Total		1	0	0	0	0	0	1	0
Career total			144	4	12	0	4	0	160	4

== Honours ==
Ludogorets

- First Professional Football League: 2011–12, 2012–13, 2013–14, 2014–15, 2015–16, 2016–17
- Bulgarian Cup: 2011–12, 2013–14
- Bulgarian Supercup: 2012, 2014

CSO Cugir

- Liga III: 2020–21
