= Jakub Hronec =

Slovak footballer

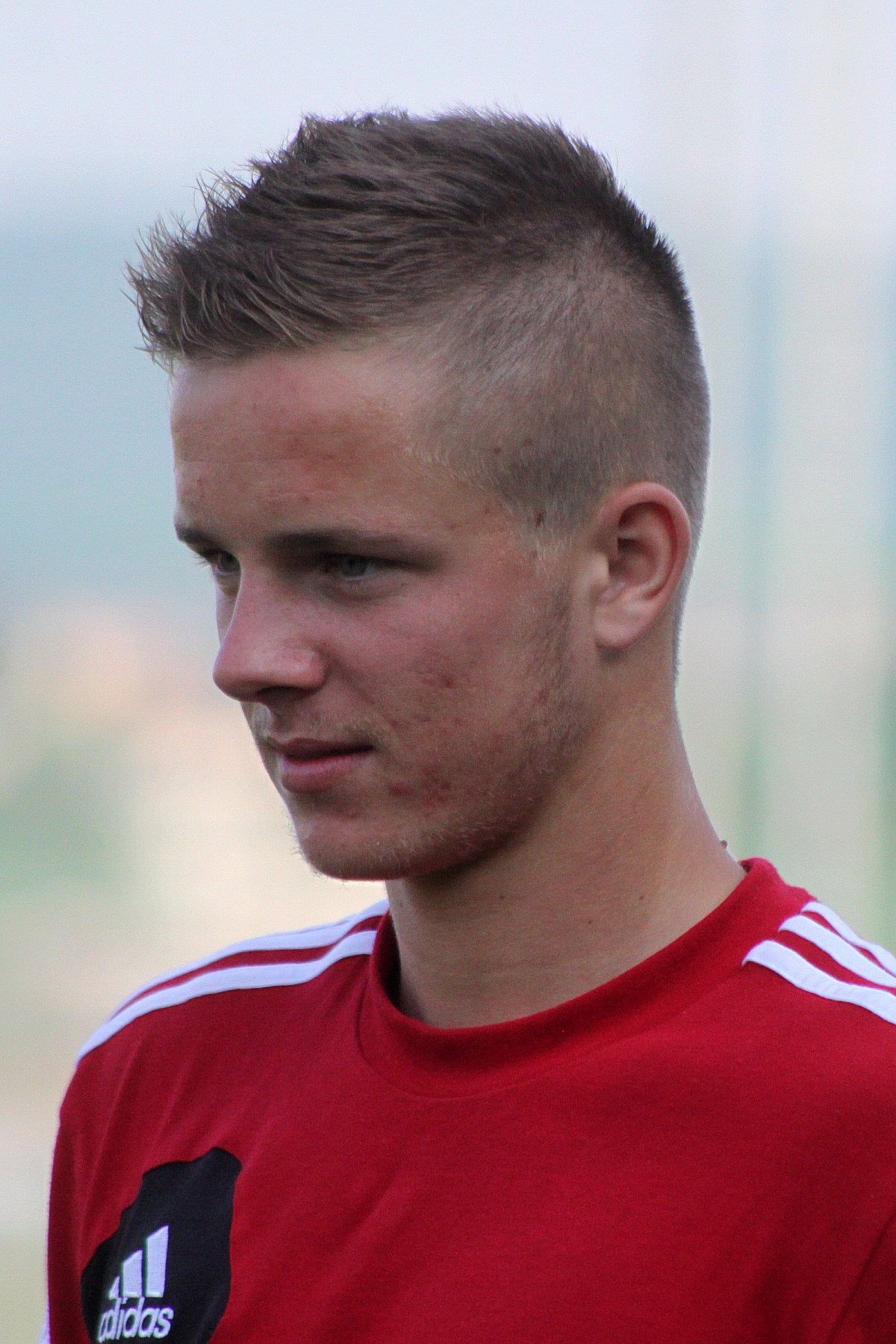
- Hronec in 2013

Personal information
- Date of birth: 5 September 1992 (age 34)
- Place of birth: Banská Bystrica, Czechoslovakia
- Height: 1.82 m (6 ft 0 in)
- Position: Midfielder

Youth career
- 2008–2011: Birmingham City

Senior career*
Years	Team	Apps	(Gls)
2011–2012	Ludogorets Razgrad	0	(0)
2011	→ Kaliakra Kavarna (loan)	4	(1)
2013–2014	Banská Bystrica	0	(0)
2014	Rimavská Sobota	10	(0)
2014–2015	Donaufeld Wien	23	(5)
2015–2016	Dunajská Lužná	13	(1)
2016–2022	FC Petržalka akadémia		
2018–2020	→ PŠC Pezinok (loan)		
2022–2023	ASK Mannersdorf	22	(0)

International career
2011–2012	Slovakia U19	2	(0)
- * Club domestic league appearances and goals as of 8 August 2023

Jakub Hronec (born 5 September 1992) is a Slovak professional footballer who plays as a midfielder. His former club was a Bulgarian club Ludogorets Razgrad.

== Career ==
Born in Banská Bystrica, Hronec began his youth career at FK Dukla. At the age of 10 he moved from Baník Pezinok to Inter Bratislava.

Hronec joined the Birmingham City Academy in 2008, when he turned 16.

On 19 August 2011, Hronec joined Bulgarian Ludogorets Razgrad on a three-year contract for an undisclosed fee.

Two weeks later, Kaliakra Kavarna signed Jakub on a four-month loan deal. On 3 October, he made his Bulgarian A PFG debut, in their 3–0 loss against Slavia Sofia. He scored his first goal on 21 October, in a 3–2 away loss against Levski Sofia after a long-distance effort.

In January 2012, Hronec returned to Ludogorets, but was not able to establish himself as part of the first team.
