= Todor Kolev (footballer, born 1980) =

Bulgarian footballer

Todor Kolev Тодор Колев
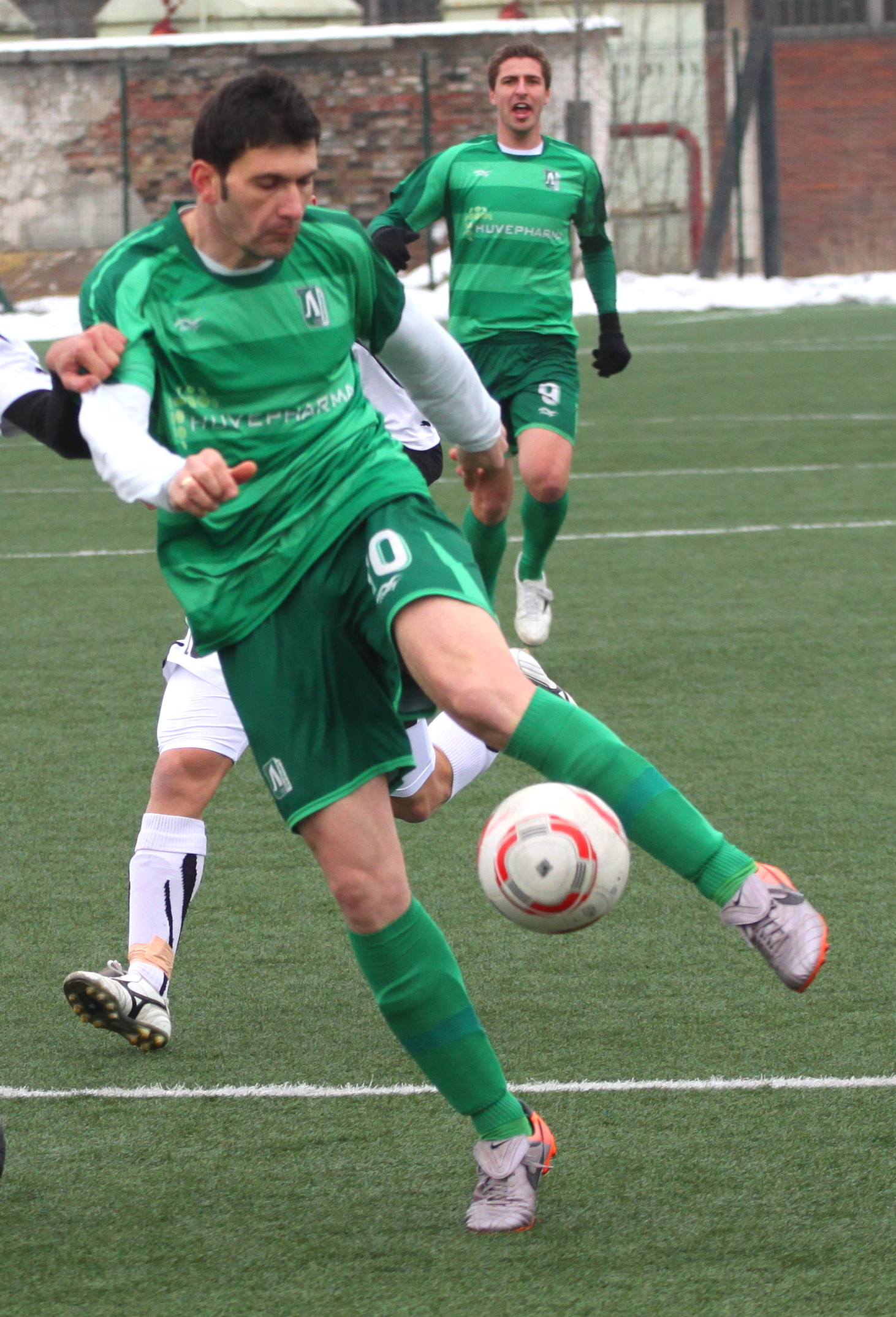
- Kolev playing for Ludogorets in 2011

Personal information
- Full name: Todor Aleksandrov Kolev
- Date of birth: 8 February 1980 (age 46)
- Place of birth: Veliko Tarnovo, Bulgaria
- Height: 1.86 m (6 ft 1 in)
- Position: Second striker

Team information
- Current team: Sevlievo (manager)

Youth career
- Etar Veliko Tarnovo

Senior career*
Years	Team	Apps	(Gls)
1997–1999	Etar Veliko Tarnovo		
1999–2005	Levski Sofia	55	(16)
2000–2002	→ Spartak Pleven (loan)	49	(57)
2005	→ Marek Dupnitsa (loan)	4	(1)
2005–2007	Slavia Sofia	55	(32)
2007–2008	Alemannia Aachen	20	(5)
2008–2010	Slavia Sofia	44	(15)
2009	→ Kiryat Shmona (loan)	14	(1)
2011	Ludogorets Razgrad	21	(10)
2012	Etar 1924	10	(6)
2012	Olympiacos Volos	10	(1)
2013	Slavia Sofia	3	(0)
2013–2014	PAS Lamia 1964	6	(4)
2014–2015	Etar Veliko Tarnovo	17	(7)
2016	Hebar Pazardzhik	13	(7)
2017–2018	Etar Veliko Tarnovo	16	(1)
2022–2024	Haskovo		
Total		337	(163)

International career
- Bulgaria U21
- * Club domestic league appearances and goals

Todor Kolev (Bulgarian: Тодор Колев; born 8 February 1980) is a Bulgarian footballer who plays as a second striker. On 27 November 2019, he got into a fight with Etar Veliko Tarnovo's first team player – Ivan Stoyanov during squad training.

== Career ==
Kolev started to play football at Etar Veliko Tarnovo. In 1999, when he was 19 years old, he was transferred to Levski Sofia, with whom he was Champion of Bulgaria in 1999–00 and won the 2000 Bulgarian Cup. Kolev made his competitive debut for Levski on 27 October 1999 against FC Iskar in the first round of the Bulgarian Cup, scoring three goals.

In June 2000, he was loaned to Spartak Pleven. In the 2001–02 season, Kolev earned 23 appearances playing in the Bulgarian top division, scoring 18 goals.

In the summer of 2002, he returned to Levski and won the 2003 Bulgarian Cup.

In January 2005, Kolev was loaned to Marek Dupnitsa. Five months later, Slavia Sofia signed Kolev on a five-year deal. In the 2006–07 season, he scored the 25 goals in 28 league matches.

In June 2007, Kolev relocated to Germany, signing a contract with TSV Alemannia Aachen. In the 2007–08 season, he earned 20 appearances playing in the 2nd Bundesliga, scoring five goals.

In August 2008, Kolev returned to Slavia Sofia.

In December 2010, Kolev signed with Ludogorets Razgrad and played for the team during the second half of the 2010/2011 season.

In September 2012, Kolev left Etar 1924 to sign with Olympiacos Volos.

In February 2017, Kolev returned to Etar Veliko Tarnovo.

== Honours ==
Levski Sofia

- Champion of Bulgaria: 1999–2000
- Bulgarian Cup: 1999–2000, 2002–03
