= Suvad Grabus =

Bosnian-Herzegovinian footballer

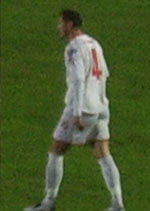

Personal information
- Date of birth: 14 December 1981 (age 44)
- Place of birth: Travnik, SFR Yugoslavia
- Height: 1.78 m (5 ft 10 in)
- Position: Left back

Senior career*
| Years | Team | Apps | (Gls) |
| 2001–2002 | Triglav Kranj | 20 | (0) |
| 2002 | Travnik | | |
| 2002–2006 | Čelik Zenica | | |
| 2006–2009 | Interblock | 57 | (1) |
| 2010 | Drava Ptuj | 7 | (0) |
| 2010 | Zrinjski Mostar | 9 | (0) |
| 2011 | Travnik | 11 | (0) |
| 2011 | Ludogorets Razgrad | 1 | (0) |
| 2012–2013 | Travnik | 12 | (0) |
| 2013 | Krka | 4 | (0) |
| 2014 | SG Steinfeld | 10 | (0) |
| 2018 | Mühldorf | 7 | (0) |
| 2019 | Arnoldstein | 14 | (0) |
| 2019 | Bodensdorf | 10 | (0) |

International career^{‡}
- Bosnia and Herzegovina U21
- * Club domestic league appearances and goals as of 24 August 2015 ‡ National team caps and goals as of 24 August 2015

Suvad Grabus (born 14 December 1981) is a Bosnian-Herzegovinian footballer.

== Club career ==
Grabus previously played for Slovenian club Interblock and for Bulgarian side Ludogorets Razgrad. He spent the final part of his career in the Austrian lower leagues.
