= Radoslav Komitov =

Bulgarian footballer

Personal information
- Full name: Radoslav Plamenov Komitov
- Date of birth: 14 December 1977 (age 48)
- Place of birth: Veliko Tarnovo, Bulgaria
- Height: 1.79 m (5 ft 10 1/2 in)
- Position: Defender

Team information
- Current team: Ludogorets Razgrad (Head of Academy)

Youth career
- 1990–1995: Etar V. Tarnovo

Senior career*
Years	Team	Apps	(Gls)
1995–1996	Etar V. Tarnovo	20	(1)
1996–1997	Loko GO	23	(1)
1997–1999	Etar V. Tarnovo	53	(1)
1999–2000	Oberhausen	14	(1)
2001	Spartak Pleven	14	(0)
2002	Svilengrad	12	(1)
2003–2004	Volov Shumen	34	(1)
2004–2009	Svetkavitsa	130	(15)
2009–2010	Dunav Ruse	19	(3)
2010–2011	Ludogorets Razgrad	17	(1)

Managerial career
- 2012–2013: Svetkavitsa Targovishte (assistant manager)
- 2018: Ludogorets Razgrad II
- * Club domestic league appearances and goals as of 13 June 2011

Radoslav Komitov (Bulgarian: Радослав Комитов; born 14 December 1977) is a former Bulgarian footballer, and currently the head of academy of Ludogorets Razgrad.
