= Antonio Mihaylov =

Bulgarian footballer

Personal information
- Full name: Antonio Krassimirov Mihaylov
- Date of birth: 9 June 1991 (age 35)
- Place of birth: Bulgaria
- Height: 1.84 m (6 ft 1/2 in)
- Position: Attacking midfielder

Team information
- Current team: AS Kreuzlingen

Youth career
- Lombardia Uno
- Milan

Senior career*
Years	Team	Apps	(Gls)
2010–2011	Sliven 2000	2	(0)
2012–2013	Septemvri Simitli	28	(5)
2013–2014	FC Kreuzlingen	24	(12)
2014–2016	SC Brühl	34	(3)
2016–2017	FC United Zürich	10	(0)
2017	FC Gossau	12	(2)
2017–	AS Kreuzlingen	?	(?)
- * Club domestic league appearances and goals as of 24 November 2017

Antonio Mihaylov (Bulgarian: Антонио Михайлов; born on 9 June 1991) is a Bulgarian footballer currently playing for AS Calcio Kreuzlingen as an attacking midfielder.

== Career ==
7-years old Mihaylov arrived in Italy together with his parents. He started playing football at Lombardia Uno. In 2007 he joined Milan. During his time in the club's youth system, he was a member of the under-18 and under-20 side who triumphed in the Coppa Italia Primavera in 2010, 25 years after the team's last success in the competition.

== Club statistics ==
As of 22 July 2010

Club	Season	League		Cup		Total	
Club	Season	Apps	Goals	Apps	Goals	Apps	Goals
Sliven	2010–11	2	0	0	0	2	0
Career totals		2	0	0	0	2	0
