= Shener Remzi =

Bulgarian footballer

Personal information
- Full name: Shener Hyusein Remzi
- Date of birth: 18 August 1976 (age 50)
- Place of birth: Razgrad, Bulgaria
- Height: 1.80 m (5 ft 11 in)
- Position: Midfielder

Senior career*
| Years | Team | Apps | (Gls) |
| 1995–1997 | Rakovski Ruse | 35 | (0) |
| 1998–2000 | Shumen | 44 | (3) |
| 2000–2001 | Botev Plovdiv | 12 | (0) |
| 2001–2003 | Chernomorets Burgas | 34 | (2) |
| 2003–2005 | Antibiotik Razgrad | ? | (?) |
| 2006 | Dunav Ruse | 26 | (10) |
| 2007–2010 | Chernomorets Burgas | 43 | (8) |
| 2008 | → Naftex Burgas (loan) | 7 | (2) |
| 2010–2011 | Ludogorets Razgrad | 23 | (2) |
| 2012 | Kubrat | 1 | (1) |
- * Club domestic league appearances and goals as of 18 March 2012

Shener Hyusein Remzi (Bulgarian: Шенер Ремзи; born 18 August 1976) is a Bulgarian former footballer who played as a midfielder.
