= Kostadin Markov =

Bulgarian footballer

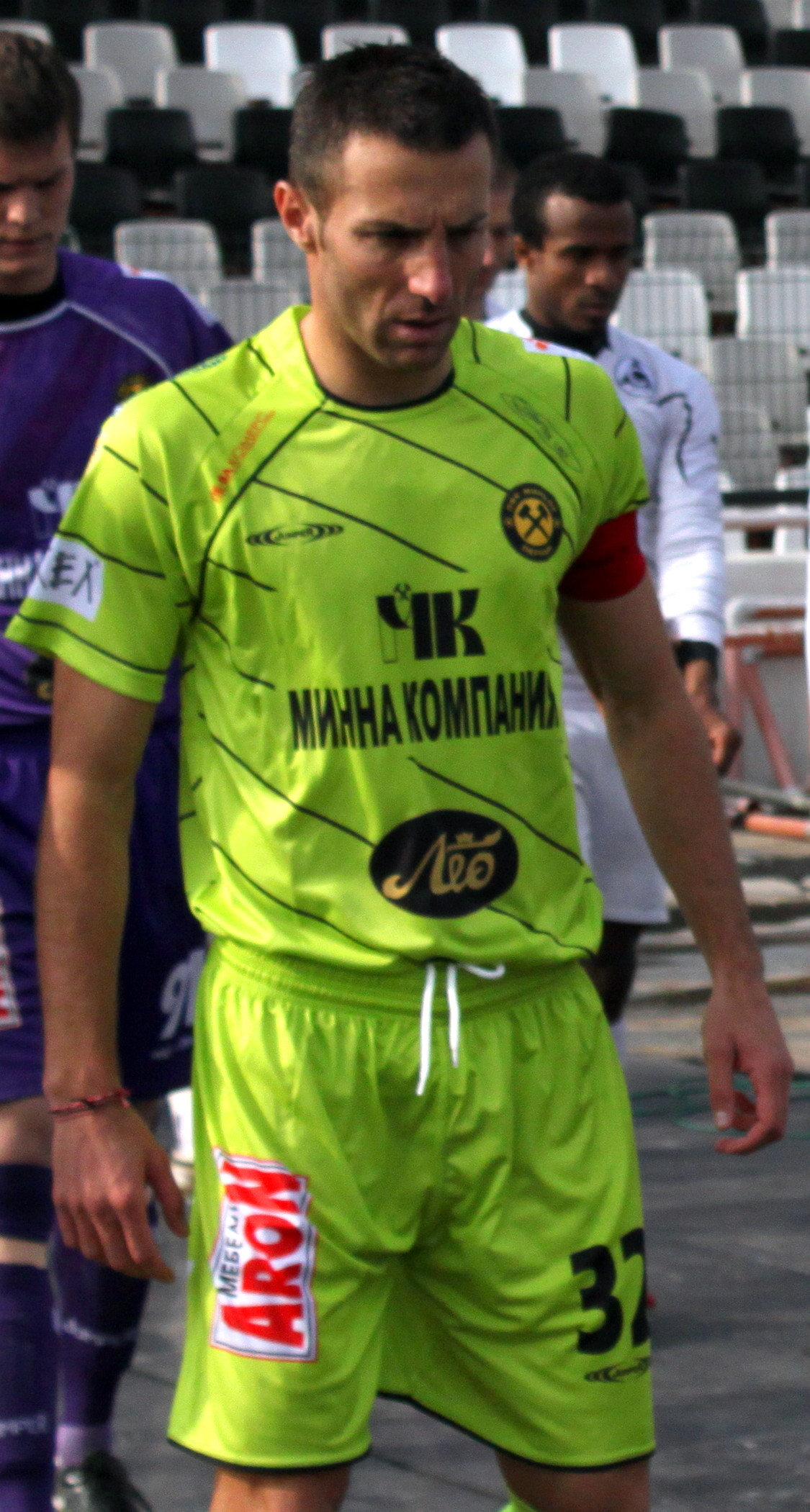

Personal information
- Full name: Kostadin Hristov Markov
- Date of birth: 18 February 1979 (age 47)
- Place of birth: Blagoevgrad, Bulgaria
- Height: 1.78 m (5 ft 10 in)
- Position: Right-back

Senior career*
Years	Team	Apps	(Gls)
1999–2001	Pirin Blagoevgrad	21	(3)
2001–2002	Spartak Pleven	39	(2)
2002–2004	Lokomotiv Sofia	39	(1)
2004–2005	Pirin Blagoevgrad	26	(4)
2005	PAE Thraki	26	(2)
2006–2007	Pirin Blagoevgrad	24	(2)
2007	Velbazhd Kyustendil	7	(0)
2008	Lokomotiv Mezdra	26	(1)
2009–2012	Minyor Pernik	76	(2)
2012–2014	Lokomotiv Plovdiv	30	(0)
2014–2015	Septemvri Simitli	28	(0)
2016	Levski Karlovo	5	(0)
- * Club domestic league appearances and goals as of 7 October 2016

Kostadin Markov (Bulgarian: Костадин Марков; born 18 February 1979) is a Bulgarian footballer. Mainly a right back, he can also play as a midfielder and winger.

On 7 October 2016, Markov left his last team Levski Karlovo.
