= PFC Ludogorets Razgrad =

Bulgarian association football club

Ludogorets
- Full name: Professional Football Club Ludogorets 1945
- Nickname: Орлите (The Eagles)
- Founded: November 1945; 81 years ago
- Ground: Huvepharma Arena
- Capacity: 10,423
- Owner: Kiril Domuschiev
- Chairman: Temenuga Gazdova
- Head coach: Igor Jovićević
- League: First League
- 2025–26: First League, 3rd of 16
- Website: ludogorets.com
| Home colours | Away colours | Third colours |

Professional Football Club Ludogorets 1945 (Bulgarian: Професионален Футболен Клуб „Лудогорец 1945“, romanized: Profesionalen Futbolen Klub Ludogorets 1945), commonly known as Ludogorets Razgrad, Ludogorets 1945 or simply Ludogorets, is a Bulgarian professional association football club based in Razgrad, which currently competes in the First Professional Football League, the top tier of the Bulgarian football league system.

In their inaugural 2011–12 season in A Group after promotion, Ludogorets made headlines by capturing the league championship and the Bulgarian Cup. Subsequently, the club made a significant continental impact in the 2013–14 UEFA Europa League when they reached the Round of 16 in only their second European run. To date they have reached the knockout stages of the Europa League four times, more than any other club in Bulgaria. Ludogorets are also only the second Bulgarian team after Levski Sofia to enter the main phase of the UEFA Champions League, a feat which they achieved in the following 2014–15 season. During that same campaign they became the first Bulgarian team to score points in the modern Champions League following a 1–0 win over Basel in Sofia.

Since their promotion to the Bulgarian top-flight in 2011, Ludogorets have established themselves as a dominant force in Bulgarian football, winning 14 consecutive titles. They have also won the Bulgarian Cup four times, as well as the Bulgarian Supercup on nine occasions. The latter is a record in Bulgarian football.

Ludogorets' traditional home colours are green and white. The club's home ground is the Huvepharma Arena in Razgrad, a stadium with a capacity of 10,423 spectators.

== History ==
=== Foundation and beginning ===
Established in November 1945 after the merging of several rural football clubs from the Ludogorie Region, Ludogorets Razgrad was initially participating in the Third football division of Bulgaria. They promoted to the Second division in 1961. In 1997 the club merged with FC Antibiotic Razgrad and was renamed to FC Antibiotic-Ludogorets. In 2005 the club was defunct. The rise of Ludogorets started in season 2009/10 when Aleksandar Aleksandrov, director of FC Razgrad 2000, inherited the history and traditional club records of the former Antibiotic-Ludogorets, returning the name to PFC Ludogorets 1945 Razgrad. The team managed to enter Second division when Ivaylo Petev was designated as a Head Coach.

=== Domuschiev era (2010–present) ===
In September 2010 the club was purchased by Bulgarian pharmaceutical entrepreneur Kiril Domuschiev, with the clear intention of bringing Ludogorets to the top division. This happened in May 2011 with Ivaylo Petev as a Head Coach when the team was promoted to the top division for the first time in the club's history.

==== First title ====
In May 2012, Ludogorets completed the domestic double when they won their first Bulgarian Cup title following a 2-1 victory against Lokomotiv Plovdiv at Lazur Stadium in Burgas, and in August 2012, they won the Bulgarian Supercup, defeating Lokomotiv 3-1, thus becoming the first team to win a treble in its first season in A Group and one of the few in the history of international football to do so.

==== Second title ====
Ludogorets started the 2012–13 season with eight straight wins and nine matches without a loss, and finished the half-season in first place, as in the previous season, with just one loss and seven goals conceded out of 15 matches. However, in the 2012–13 Bulgarian Cup, the club was eliminated in the round of 32 by CSKA Sofia 2:2 on aggregate, losing on away goals. In the spring half-season, Ludogorets occupied the first place with just three matches to play before the end of the season. Nevertheless, they were defeated 1:0 by Levski Sofia and they took the lead of A Group. On the final day of the season, Ludogorets had to beat the already relegated team of Montana and hope that Slavia Sofia would prevent Levski from winning their match. In the last minutes of the Levski–Slavia match, Levski scored an own goal which subsequently led to a 1:1 draw, allowing Ludogorets to win their second championship title in dramatic fashion again. In the 2013 Supercup, they lost 5:3 on penalties to Beroe Stara Zagora after a 1:1 draw in regular time.

==== Third title ====
In season 2013/14 Ludogorets became a hegemon in the Bulgarian club football. The "Eagles" earned their third consecutive title two rounds before the end of the championship on 7 May 2014. On 15 May 2014 Ludogorets achieved a treble after winning the Cup of Bulgaria against Botev (Plovdiv) 1-0 and the Super Cup. Both matches were played at the "Lazur" stadium in Burgas.

==== Fourth title ====
Ludogorets' fourth title came after a home win against Lokomotiv (Sofia) with 4:1 on 15 May 2015. A new tribune, named after their defender Cosmin "Moti", and the 70th anniversary of the "Eagles" were celebrated at that time.

==== Fifth title ====
On 11 May 2016 Ludogorets became the Bulgarian Champion for the fifth time in a row.

==== Sixth title ====
The 2016/2017 season was the most successful in the history of Ludogorets. They became champions of Bulgaria for the sixth consecutive time with 16 points advantage over the runner-up. For the second time in the Bulgarian's football history the team entered the Champions League groups with Georgi Dermendzhiev as a Head Coach. They ranked third in the groups by winning 2 points and continued their European tournament participation in Europa League.

==== Seventh title ====
The 2017/2018 season was another successful one for Ludogorets. The team won their domestic league Champion's Title and performed well at both European Tournaments – Champions League and Europa League.

==== Eighth title ====
Ludogorets earned their 2018/2019 season title after a 4–1 home win over PFC Cherno More in May 2019.

==== Ninth title ====
Ludogorets' domination in Bulgaria continue. The champions won their record-breaking 9th consecutive title after a 2:1 win against Beroe in May 2020.

==== Tenth title ====
Ludogorets won their 10th consecutive league title following a 3–1 victory against Beroe Stara Zagora in May 2021. Following the 10th title, the club added a star to its crest to represent the achievement in the Bulgarian league.

==== Eleventh title ====
Ludogorets' domination continued. An eleventh consecutive domestic championship title, no one but them has such an achievement in Bulgarian league football history.

==== Twelfth title ====
After a long hard season and a change in head coach in the middle of the season, with the return of former manager Ivaylo Petev back at helm, Ludogorets managed to achieve a domestic double (their 3rd similar feat since being promoted to the Bulgarian First League) by winning firstly the Bulgarian Cup by beating CSKA 1948 3:1 in the final, and eventually also winning the Bulgarian League once again for a record twelfth time by one point over CSKA Sofia by beating Cherno More Varna away from home 1:0 on the last day/match of the domestic championship season.

==== Thirteenth title ====
Georgi Dermendzhiev returned as Head Coach of Ludogorets Razgrad after the sacking of Ivaylo Petev back in October 2023. At the end of the 2023-24 campaign, the club managed to once again retain their domestic championship title for a record thirteenth time in row by beating PFC CSKA Sofia 3–1 in Razgrad to make it mathematically impossible for anyone to catch them in the race.

==== Fourteenth title ====
The club continued its domestic success by winning its 14th consecutive championship title under the reign of Igor Jovićević, who earlier in the season replaced interim manager Zahari Sirakov with the latter replacing club legend manager Georgi Dermendzhiev after the team was knocked out of the Champions League third qualifying round. This title was the first time in Ludogorets' and in overall Bulgarian football history that a team won the championship title both in the month of April and as early as with 5 games to spare. On the 22nd of May in front of over 37,000 spectators at the Vasil Levski National Stadium in Sofia, Ludogorets Razgrad managed to beat CSKA Sofia 1-0 in the 2025 Bulgarian Cup Final, which in turn was their fourth Bulgarian Cup title triumph in their history and subsequently led to them achieving an overall fourth domestic treble in their history.

=== European ===
After winning the 2011–12 Bulgarian title, Ludogorets entered the second qualifying round of the UEFA Champions League for the 2012–13 season, but were eliminated 3:4 on aggregate with a last minute away goal by Dinamo Zagreb.

As Bulgarian champions in 2012–13 season, Ludogorets played in the UEFA Champions League where they came through the qualifiers, eliminating subsequently Slovan Bratislava and Partizan en route. Ludogorets then lost to Basel in the play-offs, but earned the right to play in the UEFA Europa League.

Ludogorets played in Group B of the 2013–14 Europa League. They were unbeaten in the group stage finishing first in the group with five wins in six games, including both home and away victories over the prominent PSV and Dinamo Zagreb. Their only dropped points were a 1:1 home draw with Chornomorets Odesa. In the knockout phase, Ludogorets beat the Italian cup holders Lazio 1:0 away and drew 3:3 at home for a 4:3 aggregate win, but then lost 0:3 at home and 0:4 on aggregate to Valencia in the round of 16.

Ludogorets' 2013–14 UEFA Europa League lineup against Italian cup holders Lazio, which recorded a 1-0 win at the Stadio Olimpico.

In the 2014–15 UEFA Champions League, Ludogorets again won both their qualifiers, against F91 Dudelange of Luxembourg and Partizan. In the play-off, they defeated Steaua București to reach the group stage for the first time. Goalkeeper Vladislav Stoyanov was dismissed for a second yellow card in the last minute of extra time in the second leg, when Ludogorets had used all their substitutes. In the penalty shoot-out, centre-back Cosmin Moți, having converted the first penalty, went in goal and made two saves to put Ludogorets through 6:5 on penalties.

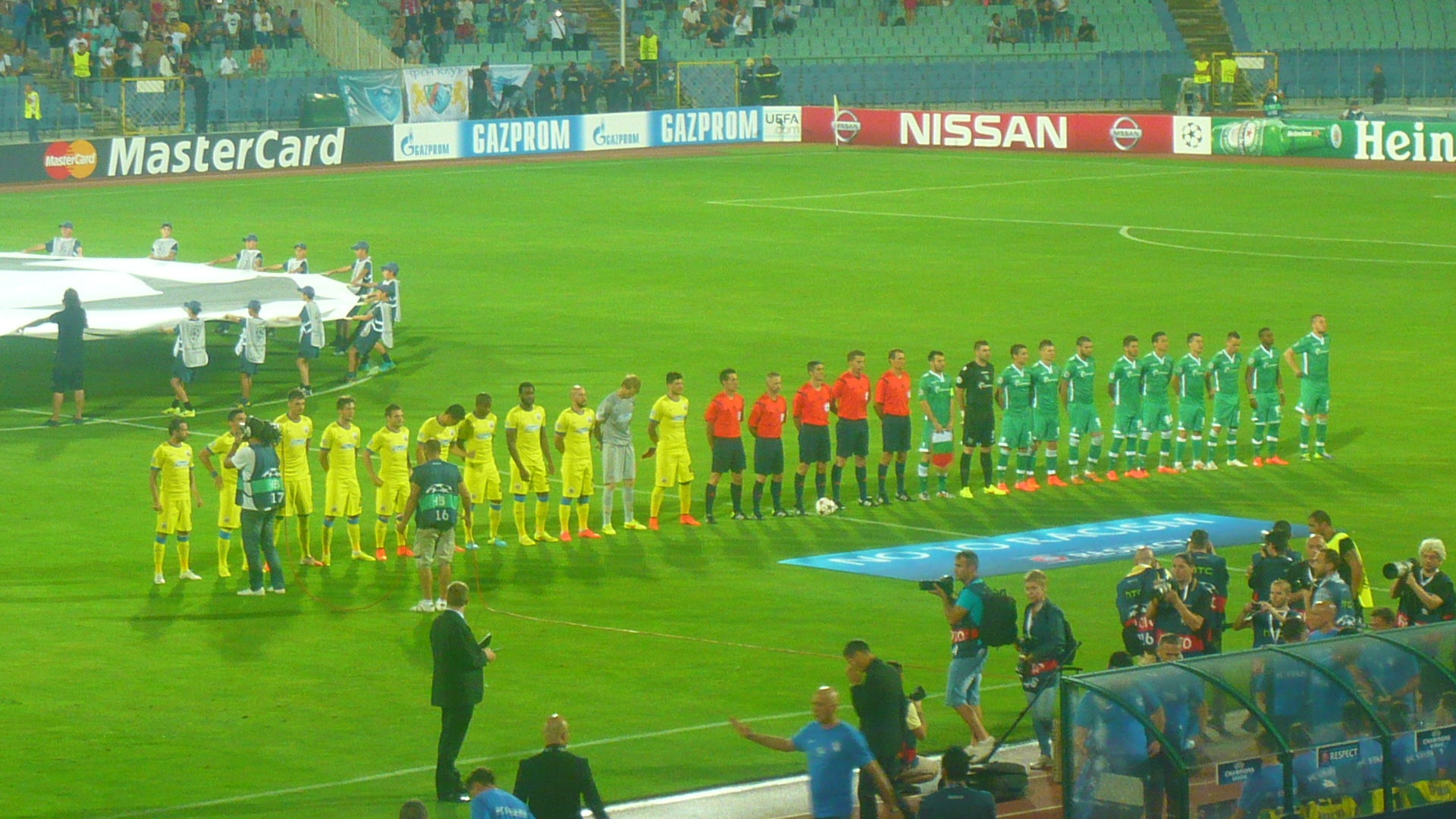
Ludogorets playing against Steaua in a second leg play-off for the 2014–15 Champions League at the Vasil Levski National Stadium.

Ludogorets made their debut in the 2014–15 Champions League group phase on 16 September 2014, grabbing a 1:1 equalizer away against Liverpool in the 90th minute scored by Dani Abalo, but in an eventual 1:2 loss, as the newly signed goalkeeper Milan Borjan gave away a penalty with a foul on Javier Manquillo, which Steven Gerrard converted to give Liverpool the victory. Ludogorets made their home debut in the 2014–15 Champions League group phase on 1 October 2014, scoring a stunning goal in the sixth minute through' attacking midfielder Marcelinho against Real Madrid, but in an eventual 1:2 loss. In this match, Cristiano Ronaldo took two penalties – the first was saved by goalkeeper Vladislav Stoyanov, while the second was scored for a 1:1 equalizer. On 22 October 2014, Yordan Minev scored his first goal for Ludogorets, scoring a crucial last-minute winning goal in a 1:0 home win over Basel in the group stage of the Champions League. On 26 November 2014, Dani Abalo scored in the third minute and Georgi Terziev scored his first goal in the 88th minute, grabbing a 2:2 equalizer against Liverpool, in an eventual 2:2 draw.

Ludogorets won their 4th consecutive A Group title, but were left by several main squad players at the end of the season. Georgi Dermendziev was also replaced with Portuguese manager Bruno Ribeiro. The late changes saw Ludogorets being eliminated in the second qualifying round of the 2015–16 UEFA Champions League by the underdog Moldovan champions Milsami Orhei.

With Georgi Dermendzhiev returning at the helm of the squad, during the 2016–17 Champions League, Ludogorets won the qualifiers against Mladost Podgorica and Red Star Belgrade respectively, followed by a success in the play-off against Viktoria Plzeň. Eventually, they became the first Bulgarian team to qualify twice for the group stage of the tournament. In the group stage, Ludogorets achieved two draws against Basel and one against Paris Saint-Germain, which were enough to secure them the third place and a transfer to the knockout phase of the 2016–17 UEFA Europa League. Ludogorets however shortly exited the competition after failing to overcome Copenhagen with an initial 1:2 home loss and a 0:0 away draw.

Ludogorets failed to qualify for the groups of the next two editions of the Champion League, but however in both cases managed to enter the groups of Europa League. In the 2017–18 season they finished second in the group behind Braga, eliminating İstanbul Başakşehir and 1899 Hoffenheim, before losing in both matches to Milan in the round of 32.

In 2019–20, they were eliminated by Ferencváros in the first Champions League qualifying round, but made their way to the group stage of the Europa League, following successful matches against Valur, The New Saints and Maribor in the qualifiers. Ludogorets were subsequently drawn again with Ferencváros, next to CSKA Moscow and Spanish club Espanyol. A 5–1 home win against CSKA Moscow was followed-up by a 3–0 away win against Ferencváros. They lost twice to Espanyol, 1–0 at home and 6–0 away, but finished second, following two 1–1 draws against both CSKA and Ferencváros, eventually securing a place in the knockout stage.

=== 75th Anniversary ===
Ludogorets earned their record-breaking 9th Bulgarian Premier League Title during their 75th Anniversary celebration on 8 July 2020 after their win 3:0 vs Levski Sofia. Ludogorets wore their special green and yellow retro kit which was used in 1945 when the club was founded. The logo with the "Л" letter over a yellow background is how the original looked like. The same design was used for a couple of decades, according to the archives. A limited edition of the retro kits were available for the fans. They feature the names of all the important team players over the course of 75 years.

== Crest, shirt and mascot ==
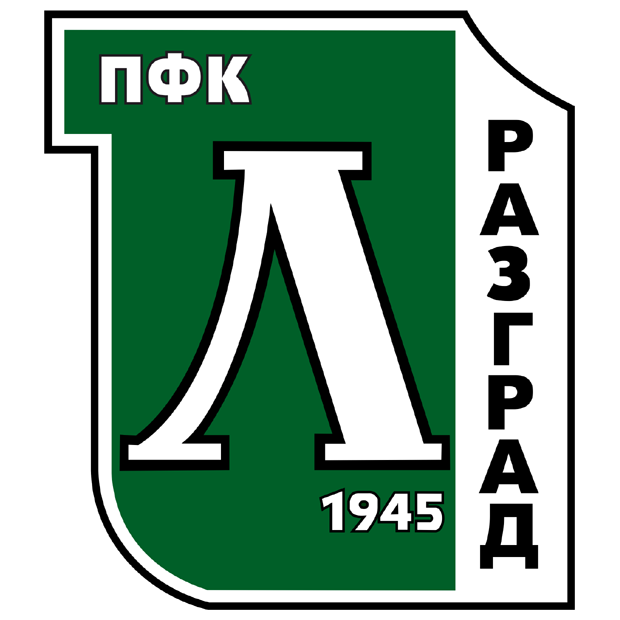
Previous crest used until 2016.

Ludogorets' main kit colour is forest green and the away kit is white. In addition, a black alternative kit is also used in some domestic matches.

The club's current crest was introduced for the beginning of the 2016–17 season. Ludogorets' supporters chose the new crest, after a poll held on the club's official website, a total of 130 different crest variants were present. A second poll was then held, to pick one from the five most voted logos. However, some of Ludogorets' supporters expressed their dissent with the new crest, which they described as "lacking identity" and "unprofessional", a lack of continuity between the old and new club crests was also noted. Lastly, the supporters pointed out the striking similarity between the new crest and that of Sporting CP. After winning their tenth championship title, Ludogorets added a golden star above their crest.

In June 2017, Ludogorets reached a sponsorship agreement with English sportswear manufacturer Umbro for the following two seasons. In June 2019, they reached a new long-term agreement with American sportswear manufacturer Nike. In June 2024, Ludogorets signed a new long-term agreement with German sportswear manufacturer Jako.. Ludogorets announced their partnership with their new general sponsor, Inbet, on July 13, 2026.

| Period | Kit supplier | Shirt sponsor (chest) |
|---|---|---|
| 2006–2010 | Tomy Sport | No sponsor |
| 2010–2011 | Adidas | Huvepharma |
| 2011–2014 | Adidas | Navibulgar |
| 2014–2016 | Macron | eCasino.bg |
| 2016–2017 | Macron | bet365 |
| 2017–2018 | Umbro | bet365 |
| 2018–2019 | Umbro | Efbet |
| 2019–2024 | Nike | Efbet |
| 2024–2026 | Jako | Efbet |
| 2026– | Jako | Inbet |

== Players ==
=== First-team squad ===
As of 8 September 2026

Note: Flags indicate national team as defined under FIFA eligibility rules; some limited exceptions apply. Players may hold more than one non-FIFA nationality.

| No. | Pos. | Nation | Player |
|---|---|---|---|
| 2 | DF | SWE | Joel Andersson |
| 3 | DF | BUL | Anton Nedyalkov (captain) |
| 4 | DF | EGY | Hossam Abdelmaguid |
| 5 | DF | BUL | Georgi Terziev |
| 6 | MF | UKR | Ivan Zhelizko |
| 8 | MF | BIH | Amir Hadžiahmetović |
| 9 | FW | SUI | Kwadwo Duah |
| 10 | FW | BRA | Nathan Fernandes (on loan from Botafogo) |
| 11 | FW | BRA | Caio Vidal |
| 12 | FW | BRA | Rwan Cruz (on loan from Botafogo) |
| 13 | GK | CRO | Ivo Grbić |
| 14 | MF | SRB | Petar Stanić |
| 15 | DF | SWE | Edvin Kurtulus |

| No. | Pos. | Nation | Player |
|---|---|---|---|
| 17 | DF | ESP | Son |
| 18 | MF | BUL | Ivaylo Chochev |
| 20 | MF | GUI | Aguibou Camara |
| 22 | DF | BUL | Mihail Polendakov (on loan from Sheffield United) |
| 23 | MF | CPV | Deroy Duarte |
| 26 | MF | CZE | Filip Kaloč |
| 37 | FW | GHA | Bernard Tekpetey |
| 39 | GK | GER | Hendrik Bonmann |
| 40 | MF | BUL | Aleksandar Marinov |
| 42 | DF | BUL | Simeon Shishkov |
| 44 | DF | TUN | Omar Rekik |
| 75 | MF | BUL | Yelisey Syrov |
| 77 | FW | BRA | Erick Marcus |

For recent transfers, see List of Bulgarian football transfers summer 2026.

=== Out on loan ===
Note: Flags indicate national team as defined under FIFA eligibility rules; some limited exceptions apply. Players may hold more than one non-FIFA nationality.

| No. | Pos. | Nation | Player |
|---|---|---|---|
| — | DF | BRA | Vinícius Nogueira (at Orlando City until 30 June 2027) |
| — | MF | BUL | Ivan Yordanov (at Lokomotiv Sofia until 30 June 2027) |
| — | FW | CIV | Yves Erick Bile (at Hapoel Petah Tikva until 30 June 2027) |

| No. | Pos. | Nation | Player |
|---|---|---|---|
| — | FW | COL | Emerson Rodríguez (at Independiente Santa Fe until 30 June 2027) |
| — | FW | ESP | Alberto Salido (at Botev Plovdiv until 30 June 2027) |

=== Foreign players ===
Up to twenty foreign nationals can be registered and given a squad number for the first team in the First League, however only five non-EU/EEA nationals can be used during a match day. Those non-EU/EEA nationals with European ancestry can claim citizenship from the nation their ancestors came from. If a player does not have European ancestry he can claim Bulgarian citizenship after playing in Bulgaria for five years, or if the Republic of Bulgaria has an interest in their naturalization, or if the person has made special contributions to the Republic of Bulgaria in the field of sports.

EU/EEA Nationals

- (Sweden) Joel Andersson
- (Germany) Hendrik Bonmann
- (Croatia) Ivo Grbić
- (Czech Republic) Filip Kaloč
- (Spain) Son

EU/EEA Nationals (Dual citizenship)

- (Brazil) (Bulgaria) Rwan Cruz
- (Switzerland) (Ghana) Kwadwo Duah
- (Cape Verde) (Netherlands) Deroy Duarte
- (Bosnia and Herzegovina) (Denmark) Amir Hadžiahmetović
- (Sweden) (Kosovo) Edvin Kurtulus
- (Brazil) (Bulgaria) Erick Marcus
- (Tunisia) (Netherlands) Omar Rekik
- (Serbia) (Croatia) Petar Stanić
- (Ghana) (Bulgaria) Bernard Tekpetey
- (Brazil) (Bulgaria) Caio Vidal
- (Ukraine) (Poland) Ivan Zhelizko

Non-EU/EEA Nationals

- (Egypt) Hossam Abdelmaguid
- (Guinea) Aguibou Camara
- (Brazil) Nathan Fernandes

=== Retired numbers ===
Note: Flags indicate national team as defined under FIFA eligibility rules; some limited exceptions apply. Players may hold more than one non-FIFA nationality.

| No. | Pos. | Nation | Player |
|---|---|---|---|
| 84 | MF | BUL | Marcelinho (2011–20) |

== Club staff ==
As of 3 November 2026

| Name | Position |
Coaching staff
| (Croatia) Igor Jovićević | Head coach |
| (Ukraine) Yuriy Benyo | Assistant coach |
| (Ukraine) Andriy Khanas | Assistant coach |
| (Spain) Pedro García | Assistant coach |
| (Bulgaria) Zdravko Zdravkov | Goalkeeping coach |
| (Bulgaria) Branimir Kostadinov | Fitness coach |
| (Spain) Javier Lurueña Lobo | Fitness coach |
| (England) John Phillips | Fitness coach |
Analytics department
| (Bulgaria) Marin Slavchev | Analyst |
| (Portugal) Daniel Caraça | Sports Scientist |
Scouting department
| (Bulgaria) Dimitar Bozhkilov | Transfers manager |
| (Bulgaria) Yakov Paparkov | Scout |
| (Bulgaria) Ivan Tsvetkov | Scout |
| (Bulgaria) Ivaylo Dimitrov | Scout |
Organisation & management
| (Bulgaria) Plamen Yordanov | Administrator |
| (Bulgaria) Filip Radoev | Team manager |
Medical department
| (Bulgaria) Valentin Velikov | Doctor |
| (Romania) Iulian Mircea | Physiotherapist |
| (Bulgaria) Encho Zlatanov | Physiotherapist |
| (Bulgaria) Dimitar Dimitrov | Physiotherapist |
Upper management
| (Bulgaria) Temenuga Gazdova | Chairman |
| (Bulgaria) Aleksandar Aleksandrov | President |
| (Bulgaria) Angel Petrichev | Executive director |
| (Bulgaria) Georgi Karamandzhukov | Sports director |
| (Romania) Cosmin Moți | Technical director |
| (Bulgaria) Radoslav Komitov | Academy director |
| (Bulgaria) Anna Pencheva | Marketing director |

== Honours ==
PFC Ludogorets Razgrad honours
| Type | Competition | Titles | Seasons |
|---|---|---|---|
| Domestic | Bulgarian First League (Note: Currently known as the efbet League for sponsorship reasons.) (Note: Current record for most titles in a row.) | 14 | 2011–12, 2012–13, 2013–14, 2014–15, 2015–16, 2016–17, 2017–18, 2018–19, 2019–20, 2020–21, 2021–22, 2022–23, 2023–24, 2024–25 |
| Domestic | Bulgarian Cup | 4 | 2011–12, 2013–14, 2022–23, 2024–25 |
| Domestic | Bulgarian Supercup (Note: Currently record for most cups won both overall and in a row.) | 9 | 2012, 2014, 2018, 2019, 2021, 2022, 2023, 2024, 2025 |
| Domestic | Bulgarian Second League | 1 | 2010–11 (East) |

- record

== European campaigns ==
As of 30 July 2026

| COMPETITION | M | W | D | L | GF | GA | GD |
|---|---|---|---|---|---|---|---|
| UEFA Champions League (UCL) | 76 | 28 | 18 | 30 | 112 | 106 | +6 |
| UEFA Europa League (UEL) | 93 | 30 | 26 | 37 | 125 | 124 | +1 |
| UEFA Europa Conference League (UECL) | 12 | 5 | 2 | 5 | 15 | 18 | -3 |
| T O T A L | 181 | 63 | 46 | 72 | 252 | 248 | +4 |

=== Matches ===
As of 23 July 2026

Ludogorets have played against 80 teams from 42 federations. They have faced 66 teams once and additional 14 teams more than once.

Ludogorets is the first and only Bulgarian team to have played in all three European tournaments.

Ludogorets have qualified to the group stage of the European tournaments 12 times: UCL - 2 times (2014–2015, 2016–2017); UEL - 9 times (2013–2014, 2017–2018, 2018–2019, 2019–2020, 2020–2021, 2021–2022, 2022–2023, 2024-2025*, 2025-2026*); UECL - 1 time (2023–2024) *-new format

| Season | Competition | Round | Club | Home | Away | Aggregate |
|---|---|---|---|---|---|---|
| 2012–13 | UEFA Champions League | 2Q | (Croatia) Dinamo Zagreb | 1–1 | 2–3 | 3–4 |
| 2013–14 | UEFA Champions League | 2Q | (Slovakia) Slovan Bratislava | 3–0 | 1–2 | 4–2 |
| 2013–14 | UEFA Champions League | 3Q | (Serbia) Partizan | 2–1 | 1–0 | 3–1 |
| 2013–14 | UEFA Champions League | PO | (Switzerland) Basel | 2–4 | 0–2 | 2–6 |
| 2013–14 | UEFA Europa League | Group B | (Netherlands) PSV | 2–0 | 2–0 | 1st |
| 2013–14 | UEFA Europa League | Group B | (Croatia) Dinamo Zagreb | 3–0 | 2–1 | 1st |
| 2013–14 | UEFA Europa League | Group B | (Ukraine) Chornomorets Odesa | 1–1 | 1–0 | 1st |
| 2013–14 | UEFA Europa League | Round of 32 | (Italy) Lazio | 3–3 | 1–0 | 4–3 |
| 2013–14 | UEFA Europa League | Round of 16 | (Spain) Valencia | 0–3 | 0–1 | 0–4 |
| 2014–15 | UEFA Champions League | 2Q | (Luxembourg) F91 Dudelange | 4–0 | 1–1 | 5–1 |
| 2014–15 | UEFA Champions League | 3Q | (Serbia) Partizan | 0–0 | 2–2 | 2–2 (a) |
| 2014–15 | UEFA Champions League | PO | (Romania) Steaua București | 1–0 | 0–1 | 1–1 (6–5 p.) |
| 2014–15 | UEFA Champions League | Group B | (Spain) Real Madrid | 1–2 | 0–4 | 4th |
| 2014–15 | UEFA Champions League | Group B | (Switzerland) Basel | 1–0 | 0–4 | 4th |
| 2014–15 | UEFA Champions League | Group B | (England) Liverpool | 2–2 | 1–2 | 4th |
| 2015–16 | UEFA Champions League | 2Q | (Moldova) Milsami Orhei | 0–1 | 1–2 | 1–3 |
| 2016–17 | UEFA Champions League | 2Q | (Montenegro) Mladost Podgorica | 2–0 | 3–0 | 5–0 |
| 2016–17 | UEFA Champions League | 3Q | (Serbia) Red Star Belgrade | 2–2 | 4–2 (a.e.t.) | 6–4 |
| 2016–17 | UEFA Champions League | PO | (Czech Republic) Viktoria Plzeň | 2–0 | 2–2 | 4–2 |
| 2016–17 | UEFA Champions League | Group A | (France) Paris Saint-Germain | 1–3 | 2–2 | 3rd |
| 2016–17 | UEFA Champions League | Group A | (England) Arsenal | 2–3 | 0–6 | 3rd |
| 2016–17 | UEFA Champions League | Group A | (Switzerland) Basel | 0–0 | 1–1 | 3rd |
| 2016–17 | UEFA Europa League | Round of 32 | (Denmark) Copenhagen | 1–2 | 0–0 | 1–2 |
| 2017–18 | UEFA Champions League | 2Q | (Lithuania) Žalgiris | 4–1 | 1–2 | 5–3 |
| 2017–18 | UEFA Champions League | 3Q | (Israel) Hapoel Be'er Sheva | 3–1 | 0–2 | 3–3 (a) |
| 2017–18 | UEFA Europa League | PO | (Lithuania) Sūduva Marijampolė | 2–0 | 0–0 | 2–0 |
| 2017–18 | UEFA Europa League | Group C | (Portugal) Braga | 1–1 | 2–0 | 2nd |
| 2017–18 | UEFA Europa League | Group C | (Germany) 1899 Hoffenheim | 2–1 | 1–1 | 2nd |
| 2017–18 | UEFA Europa League | Group C | (Turkey) İstanbul Başakşehir | 1–2 | 0–0 | 2nd |
| 2017–18 | UEFA Europa League | Round of 32 | (Italy) Milan | 0–3 | 0–1 | 0–4 |
| 2018–19 | UEFA Champions League | 1Q | (Northern Ireland) Crusaders | 7–0 | 2–0 | 9–0 |
| 2018–19 | UEFA Champions League | 2Q | (Hungary) MOL Vidi | 0–0 | 0–1 | 0–1 |
| 2018–19 | UEFA Europa League | 3Q | (Bosnia and Herzegovina) Zrinjski Mostar | 1–0 | 1–1 | 2–1 |
| 2018–19 | UEFA Europa League | PO | (Georgia (country)) Torpedo Kutaisi | 4–0 | 1–0 | 5–0 |
| 2018–19 | UEFA Europa League | Group A | (Germany) Bayer Leverkusen | 2–3 | 1–1 | 4th |
| 2018–19 | UEFA Europa League | Group A | (Switzerland) Zürich | 1–1 | 0–1 | 4th |
| 2018–19 | UEFA Europa League | Group A | (Cyprus) AEK Larnaca | 0–0 | 1–1 | 4th |
| 2019–20 | UEFA Champions League | 1Q | (Hungary) Ferencváros | 2–3 | 1–2 | 3–5 |
| 2019–20 | UEFA Europa League | 2Q | (Iceland) Valur | 4–0 | 1–1 | 5–1 |
| 2019–20 | UEFA Europa League | 3Q | (Wales) The New Saints | 5–0 | 4–0 | 9–0 |
| 2019–20 | UEFA Europa League | PO | (Slovenia) Maribor | 0–0 | 2–2 | 2–2 (a) |
| 2019–20 | UEFA Europa League | Group H | (Russia) CSKA Moscow | 5–1 | 1–1 | 2nd |
| 2019–20 | UEFA Europa League | Group H | (Spain) Espanyol | 0–1 | 0–6 | 2nd |
| 2019–20 | UEFA Europa League | Group H | (Hungary) Ferencváros | 1–1 | 3–0 | 2nd |
| 2019–20 | UEFA Europa League | Round of 32 | (Italy) Inter Milan | 0–2 | 1–2 | 1–4 |
| 2020–21 | UEFA Champions League | 1Q | (Montenegro) Budućnost Podgorica | —N/a | 3–1 | 3–1 |
| 2020–21 | UEFA Champions League | 2Q | (Denmark) Midtjylland | 0–1 | —N/a | 0–1 |
| 2020–21 | UEFA Europa League | PO | (Belarus) Dynamo Brest | —N/a | 2–0 | 2–0 |
| 2020–21 | UEFA Europa League | Group J | (England) Tottenham Hotspur | 1–3 | 0–4 | 4th |
| 2020–21 | UEFA Europa League | Group J | (Austria) LASK | 1–3 | 3–4 | 4th |
| 2020–21 | UEFA Europa League | Group J | (Belgium) Royal Antwerp | 1–2 | 1–3 | 4th |
| 2021–22 | UEFA Champions League | 1Q | (Belarus) Shakhtyor Soligorsk | 1–0 | 1–0 | 2–0 |
| 2021–22 | UEFA Champions League | 2Q | (Slovenia) Mura | 3–1 | 0–0 | 3–1 |
| 2021–22 | UEFA Champions League | 3Q | (Greece) Olympiacos | 2–2 | 1–1 | 3–3 (4–1 p) |
| 2021–22 | UEFA Champions League | PO | (Sweden) Malmö FF | 2–1 | 0–2 | 2–3 |
| 2021–22 | UEFA Europa League | Group F | (Portugal) Braga | 0–1 | 2–4 | 4th |
| 2021–22 | UEFA Europa League | Group F | (Serbia) Red Star Belgrade | 0–1 | 0–1 | 4th |
| 2021–22 | UEFA Europa League | Group F | (Denmark) Midtjylland | 0–0 | 1–1 | 4th |
| 2022–23 | UEFA Champions League | 1Q | (Montenegro) Sutjeska Nikšić | 2–0 | 1–0 | 3–0 |
| 2022–23 | UEFA Champions League | 2Q | (Republic of Ireland) Shamrock Rovers | 3–0 | 1–2 | 4–2 |
| 2022–23 | UEFA Champions League | 3Q | (Croatia) Dinamo Zagreb | 1–2 | 2–4 | 3–6 |
| 2022–23 | UEFA Europa League | PO | (Lithuania) Žalgiris | 1–0 | 3–3 | 4–3 |
| 2022–23 | UEFA Europa League | Group C | (Italy) Roma | 2–1 | 1–3 | 3rd |
| 2022–23 | UEFA Europa League | Group C | (Spain) Real Betis | 0–1 | 2–3 | 3rd |
| 2022–23 | UEFA Europa League | Group C | (Finland) HJK | 2–0 | 1–1 | 3rd |
| 2022–23 | UEFA Europa Conference League | KPO | (Belgium) Anderlecht | 1–0 | 1–2 | 2–2 (0–3 p) |
| 2023–24 | UEFA Champions League | 1Q | (Kosovo) Ballkani | 4–0 | 0–2 | 4–2 |
| 2023–24 | UEFA Champions League | 2Q | (Slovenia) Olimpija Ljubljana | 1–1 | 1–2 | 2–3 |
| 2023–24 | UEFA Europa League | 3Q | (Kazakhstan) Astana | 5–1 | 1–2 | 6–3 |
| 2023–24 | UEFA Europa League | PO | (Netherlands) Ajax | 1–4 | 1–0 | 2–4 |
| 2023–24 | UEFA Europa Conference League | Group H | (Turkey) Fenerbahçe | 2–0 | 1–3 | 2nd |
| 2023–24 | UEFA Europa Conference League | Group H | (Slovakia) Spartak Trnava | 4–0 | 2–1 | 2nd |
| 2023–24 | UEFA Europa Conference League | Group H | (Denmark) Nordsjælland | 1–0 | 1–7 | 2nd |
| 2023–24 | UEFA Europa Conference League | KPO | (Switzerland) Servette | 0–1 | 0–0 | 0–1 |
| 2024–25 | UEFA Champions League | 1Q | (Georgia (country)) Dinamo Batumi | 3–1 | 0–1 | 3–2 |
| 2024–25 | UEFA Champions League | 2Q | (Belarus) Dinamo Minsk | 2–0 | 0–1 | 2–1 |
| 2024–25 | UEFA Champions League | 3Q | (Azerbaijan) Qarabağ | 2–7 (a.e.t.) | 2–1 | 4–8 |
| 2024–25 | UEFA Europa League | PO | (Moldova) Petrocub Hîncești | 4–0 | 2–1 | 6–1 |
| 2024–25 | UEFA Europa League | LP | (Czech Republic) Slavia Prague | 0–2 | —N/a | 33rd |
| 2024–25 | UEFA Europa League | LP | (Czech Republic) Viktoria Plzeň | —N/a | 0–0 | 33rd |
| 2024–25 | UEFA Europa League | LP | (Belgium) Anderlecht | —N/a | 0–2 | 33rd |
| 2024–25 | UEFA Europa League | LP | (Spain) Athletic Bilbao | 1–2 | —N/a | 33rd |
| 2024–25 | UEFA Europa League | LP | (Italy) Lazio | —N/a | 0–0 | 33rd |
| 2024–25 | UEFA Europa League | LP | (Netherlands) AZ Alkmaar | 2–2 | —N/a | 33rd |
| 2024–25 | UEFA Europa League | LP | (Denmark) Midtjylland | 0–2 | —N/a | 33rd |
| 2024–25 | UEFA Europa League | LP | (France) Lyon | —N/a | 1–1 | 33rd |
| 2025–26 | UEFA Champions League | 1Q | (Belarus) Dinamo Minsk | 1–0 | 2–2 (a.e.t.) | 3–2 |
| 2025–26 | UEFA Champions League | 2Q | (Croatia) Rijeka | 3–1 (a.e.t.) | 0–0 | 3–1 |
| 2025–26 | UEFA Champions League | 3Q | (Hungary) Ferencváros | 0–0 | 0–3 | 0–3 |
| 2025–26 | UEFA Europa League | PO | (North Macedonia) Shkëndija | 4–1 (a.e.t.) | 1–2 | 5–3 |
| 2025–26 | UEFA Europa League | LP | (Sweden) Malmö FF | —N/a | 2–1 | 22nd |
| 2025–26 | UEFA Europa League | LP | (Spain) Real Betis | 0–2 | —N/a | 22nd |
| 2025–26 | UEFA Europa League | LP | (Switzerland) Young Boys | —N/a | 2–3 | 22nd |
| 2025–26 | UEFA Europa League | LP | (Hungary) Ferencváros | —N/a | 1–3 | 22nd |
| 2025–26 | UEFA Europa League | LP | (Spain) Celta Vigo | 3–2 | —N/a | 22nd |
| 2025–26 | UEFA Europa League | LP | (Greece) PAOK | 3–3 | —N/a | 22nd |
| 2025–26 | UEFA Europa League | LP | (Scotland) Rangers | —N/a | 0–1 | 22nd |
| 2025–26 | UEFA Europa League | LP | (France) Nice | 1–0 | —N/a | 22nd |
| 2025–26 | UEFA Europa League | KPO | (Hungary) Ferencváros | 2–1 | 0–2 | 2–3 |
| 2026–27 | UEFA Conference League | 2Q | (Israel) Hapoel Tel Aviv | 2–2 | 0–2 | 2–4 |

Notes

- 1Q: First Qualifying round
- 2Q: Second qualifying round
- 3Q: Third qualifying round
- PO: Play-off round
- LP: League phase
- KPO: Knock-out phase playoffs

=== UEFA club coefficient ranking ===
As of 20 February 2026

| 2026 | 2025 | Mvmt. | Club | 2021–22 | 2022–23 | 2023–24 | 2024–25 | 2025–26 | 2026 Coeff. |
|---|---|---|---|---|---|---|---|---|---|
| 72 | 68 | –4 | (Austria) Rapid Wien | 4.00 | 2.50 | 2.50 | 18.25 | 2.50 | 29.750 |
| 73 | 62 | –11 | (Switzerland) Young Boys | 8.00 | 2.50 | 7.00 | 6.00 | 6.00 | 29.500 |
| 74 | 76 | +2 | (Bulgaria) Ludogorets | 3.00 | 5.00 | 9.00 | 4.00 | 7.75 | 28.750 |
| 75 | 81 | +6 | (Austria) Sturm Graz | 3.00 | 6.00 | 4.00 | 10.00 | 5.00 | 28.000 |
| 76 | 79 | +3 | (England) Newcastle | 0.00 | 0.00 | 8.00 | 0.00 | 19.25 | 27.250 |

=== All-time European performance ===
As of 23 July 2026

Positive Neutral Negative

| Opponents by country | Played | Won | Drawn | Lost | GD |
|---|---|---|---|---|---|
| Austria | 2 | 0 | 0 | 2 | 4:7 |
| Azerbaijan | 2 | 1 | 0 | 1 | 4:8 |
| Belgium | 5 | 1 | 0 | 4 | 4:9 |
| Belarus | 7 | 5 | 1 | 1 | 9:3 |
| Bosnia and Herzegovina | 2 | 1 | 1 | 0 | 2:1 |
| Croatia | 8 | 3 | 2 | 3 | 14:12 |
| Cyprus | 2 | 0 | 2 | 0 | 1:1 |
| Czech Republic | 4 | 1 | 2 | 1 | 4:4 |
| Denmark | 8 | 1 | 3 | 4 | 4:13 |
| England | 6 | 0 | 1 | 5 | 6:20 |
| Finland | 2 | 1 | 1 | 0 | 3:1 |
| France | 4 | 1 | 2 | 1 | 5:6 |
| Georgia | 4 | 3 | 0 | 1 | 8:2 |
| Germany | 4 | 1 | 2 | 1 | 6:6 |
| Greece | 3 | 0 | 3 | 0 | 6:6 |
| Hungary | 9 | 1 | 3 | 5 | 8:13 |
| Iceland | 2 | 1 | 1 | 0 | 5:1 |
| Israel | 4 | 1 | 1 | 2 | 5:7 |
| Italy | 9 | 2 | 2 | 5 | 8:15 |
| Kazakhstan | 2 | 1 | 0 | 1 | 6:3 |
| Kosovo | 2 | 1 | 0 | 1 | 4:2 |
| Lithuania | 6 | 3 | 2 | 1 | 11:6 |
| Luxembourg | 2 | 1 | 1 | 0 | 5:1 |
| Moldova | 4 | 2 | 0 | 2 | 7:4 |
| Montenegro | 5 | 5 | 0 | 0 | 11:1 |
| Netherlands | 5 | 3 | 1 | 1 | 8:6 |
| North Macedonia | 2 | 1 | 0 | 1 | 5:3 |
| Northern Ireland | 2 | 2 | 0 | 0 | 9:0 |
| Portugal | 4 | 1 | 1 | 2 | 5:6 |
| Republic of Ireland | 2 | 1 | 0 | 1 | 4:2 |
| Romania | 2 | 1 | 0 | 1 | 1:1 |
| Russia | 2 | 1 | 1 | 0 | 6:2 |
| Scotland | 1 | 0 | 0 | 1 | 0:1 |
| Serbia | 8 | 3 | 3 | 2 | 11:9 |
| Slovakia | 4 | 3 | 0 | 1 | 10:3 |
| Slovenia | 6 | 1 | 4 | 1 | 7:6 |
| Spain | 12 | 1 | 0 | 11 | 7:27 |
| Sweden | 3 | 2 | 0 | 1 | 4:4 |
| Switzerland | 11 | 1 | 4 | 6 | 6:16 |
| Turkey | 4 | 1 | 1 | 2 | 4:5 |
| Ukraine | 2 | 1 | 1 | 0 | 2:1 |
| Wales | 2 | 2 | 0 | 0 | 9:0 |

== Records and notable stats ==
=== Club records ===
- Biggest home win in First League: Ludogorets 7–0 Beroe (18 April 2018), Ludogorets 8–1 Botev Vratsa (8 April 2023)
- Biggest away win in First League: Minyor Pernik 0–7 Ludogorets (18 April 2012)
- Biggest home loss in First League: Ludogorets 0–2 Cherno More (29 March 2012), Ludogorets 2–4 Litex Lovech (20 October 2013), Ludogorets 0–2 Beroe (20 May 2016), Ludogorets 3–5 Pirin Blagoevgrad (13 December 2021)
- Biggest away loss in First League: Cherno More 4–0 Ludogorets (19 May 2024)
- Most consecutive matches without a loss in First League: 35 (2018–19 - 5, 2019–20 - 30)
- Most consecutive matches without a win in First League (single season): 4 (2017–18)
- Most consecutive wins in First League (single season): 14 (2017–18)
- Most consecutive losses in First League (single season): 3 (2011–12)
- Biggest European home win: Ludogorets 7–0 (Northern Ireland) Crusaders (11 July 2018, UEFA Champions League First qualifying round first leg)
- Biggest European away win: (Wales) The New Saints 0–4 Ludogorets (15 August 2019, UEFA Europa League Third qualifying round second leg)
- Biggest European home defeat: Ludogorets 2–7 (Azerbaijan) Qarabağ (13 August 2024, UEFA Champions League Third qualifying round second leg)
- Biggest European away defeat: (England) Arsenal 6–0 Ludogorets (19 October 2016, UEFA Champions League group stage), (Spain) Espanyol 6–0 Ludogorets (7 November 2019, UEFA Europa League group stage)

=== Individual records ===
- Most appearances: (Bulgaria) Svetoslav Dyakov (350)
- Most goals: (Romania) Claudiu Keșerü (139)
- Most league appearances: (Bulgaria) Svetoslav Dyakov (242)
- Most league goals: (Romania) Claudiu Keșerü (113)
- Most European competition appearances: (Romania) Cosmin Moți (81)
- Most European competition goals: (Romania) Claudiu Keșerü (16)
- Most capped Bulgarian player: (Bulgaria) Stanislav Manolev - 51 caps
- Most capped foreign player: (Canada) Milan Borjan – 80 caps
- Most trophies won by player with Ludogorets: (Bulgaria) Georgi Terziev (19)

=== Other records ===
- Ludogorets is the second team (along with Levadia Tallinn from Estonia) to win a domestic treble after being promoted from the second to the first level of the football league pyramid of its country.
- Ludogorets is the first team in Bulgaria to win 2 promotions in a row and then succeed in achieving a treble.
- The Bulgarian club with the most consecutive domestic league titles – 14 (2012–present).
- During the UEFA Europa League 2013–14 season Ludogorets became the first Bulgarian team to win a group in European competitions, recording 5 wins and 1 draw.
- Ludogorets became the first Bulgarian team to begin their group stage participation in European tournaments with 3 consecutive wins, when in the 2013–14 UEFA Europa League group stage they recorded consecutive wins against PSV (2–0), Dinamo Zagreb (3–0) and Chornomorets Odesa (1–0), without conceding a goal in any of the games.
- After the end of the 2013–14 UEFA Europa League group stage, Ludogorets became the first Bulgarian team to record 9 wins in European competitions in a single season, as well as the first Bulgarian team to record 5 away wins in European competitions in a single season.
- After the end of the 2014–15 UEFA Champions League group stage, Ludogorets became the first Bulgarian team to record points in that competition when they defeated Basel 1–0 at home. This was also the first home win for a Bulgarian team in the UEFA Champions League.
- Ludogorets became the first Bulgarian team to qualify twice for the Champions League group stage, achieving the feat during the 2016–17 season of the tournament. During that season, the team set a new record for most goals scored (6), and became the first Bulgarian team to avoid finishing last in their group.
- On 19 September 2019 Ludogorets defeated CSKA Moscow 5–1 in the 2019–20 UEFA Europa League group stage, recording the biggest group stage win by a Bulgarian team.
- On 3 October 2019 Ludogorets defeated Ferencváros 0–3 in the 2019–20 UEFA Europa League group stage, recording the biggest away group stage win by a Bulgarian team.

== Goalscoring and appearance records ==
As of 2 June 2026

Most appearances for the club in all competitions

| Rank | Name | Career | Appearances |
|---|---|---|---|
| 1 | (Bulgaria) Svetoslav Dyakov | 2011–2021 | 350 |
| 2 | (Bulgaria) (Brazil) Marcelinho | 2011–2020 | 347 |
| 3 | (Romania) Cosmin Moți | 2012–2021 | 298 |
| 4 | (Bulgaria) (Brazil) Wanderson | 2014–2022 | 270 |
| 5 | (Bulgaria) **Anton Nedyalkov** | 2018– | 263 |
| 6 | (Bulgaria) (Brazil) Cicinho | 2015–2023 | 245 |
| 7 | (Romania) Claudiu Keșerü | 2015–2021 | 244 |
| 8 | (Benin) **Olivier Verdon** | 2020– | 235 |
| 9 | (Bulgaria) **Georgi Terziev** | 2013– | 233 |
| 10 | (Madagascar) Anicet Abel | 2014–2021 | 226 |

Most goals for the club in all competitions

| Rank | Name | Career | Goals |
|---|---|---|---|
| 1 | (Romania) Claudiu Keșerü | 2015–2021 | 139 |
| 2 | (Bulgaria) (Brazil) Marcelinho | 2011–2020 | 98 |
| 3 | (Bulgaria) (Brazil) Wanderson | 2014–2022 | 69 |
| 4 | (Netherlands) Virgil Misidjan | 2013–2018 | 49 |
| 5 | (Ghana) **Bernard Tekpetey** | 2020– | 47 |
| 6 | (Brazil) Juninho Quixadá | 2011–2018 | 42 |
| 7 | (Bulgaria) Kiril Despodov | 2020–2023 | 39 |
| 8 | (Poland) Jakub Świerczok | 2018–2021 | 37 |
| 9 | (Romania) Cosmin Moți | 2012–2021 | 36 |
| 10 | (Bulgaria) **Ivaylo Chochev** | 2024– | 31 |
| 10 | (Brazil) Rwan Cruz | 2023–2025; 2026 | 31 |

- Includes appearances in First League, Bulgarian Cup, Bulgarian Supercup, UEFA Champions League and UEFA Europa League.
- Players in **bold** are still playing for Ludogorets.

As of 3 December 2025

Most appearances for the club in First League

| Rank | Name | Career | Appearances |
|---|---|---|---|
| 1 | (Bulgaria) Svetoslav Dyakov | 2011–2021 | 242 |
| 2 | (Bulgaria) (Brazil) Marcelinho | 2011–2020 | 234 |
| 3 | (Romania) Cosmin Moți | 2012–2021 | 191 |
| 4 | (Bulgaria) (Brazil) Wanderson | 2014–2022 | 176 |
| 5 | (Romania) Claudiu Keșerü | 2015–2021 | 169 |
| 6 | (Bulgaria) **Georgi Terziev** | 2013– | 162 |
| 7 | (Bulgaria) (Brazil) Cicinho | 2015–2023 | 159 |
| 8 | (Bulgaria) **Anton Nedyalkov** | 2018– | 156 |
| 9 | (Madagascar) Anicet Abel | 2014–2021 | 148 |
| 10 | (Brazil) Juninho Quixadá | 2011–2018 | 132 |

Most goals for the club in First League

| Rank | Name | Career | Goals |
|---|---|---|---|
| 1 | (Romania) Claudiu Keșerü | 2015–2021 | 113 |
| 2 | (Bulgaria) (Brazil) Marcelinho | 2011–2020 | 75 |
| 3 | (Bulgaria) (Brazil) Wanderson | 2014–2022 | 53 |
| 4 | (Netherlands) Virgil Misidjan | 2013–2018 | 35 |
| 5 | (Brazil) Juninho Quixadá | 2011–2018 | 34 |
| 6 | (Ghana) **Bernard Tekpetey** | 2020– | 33 |
| 7 | (Switzerland) **Kwadwo Duah** | 2023– | 27 |
| 8 | (Bulgaria) Kiril Despodov | 2020–2023 | 27 |
| 9 | (Romania) Cosmin Moți | 2012–2021 | 26 |
| 10 | (Brazil) Rwan Cruz | 2023–2025; 2026 | 26 |

- Players in **bold** are still playing for Ludogorets.

As of 3 December 2025

Most appearances for the club in European competitions

| Rank | Name | Career | Appearances |
|---|---|---|---|
| 1 | (Bulgaria) **Anton Nedyalkov** | 2018– | 85 |
| 2 | (Romania) Cosmin Moți | 2012–2021 | 81 |
| 3 | (Bulgaria) (Brazil) Marcelinho | 2011–2020 | 80 |
| 4 | (Bulgaria) Svetoslav Dyakov | 2011–2021 | 78 |
| 5 | (Benin) **Olivier Verdon** | 2020– | 75 |
| 6 | (Bulgaria) (Brazil) Wanderson | 2014–2022 | 70 |
| 7 | (Ghana) **Bernard Tekpetey** | 2020– | 66 |
| 8 | (Bulgaria) (Brazil) Cicinho | 2015–2023 | 65 |
| 9 | (Romania) Claudiu Keșerü | 2015–2021 | 57 |
| 10 | (Brazil) Pedro Naressi | 2022–2026 | 54 |

Most goals for the club in European competitions

| Rank | Name | Career | Goals |
|---|---|---|---|
| 1 | (Romania) Claudiu Keșerü | 2015–2021 | 16 |
| 2 | (Bulgaria) (Brazil) Marcelinho | 2011–2020 | 15 |
| 3 | (Bulgaria) (Brazil) Wanderson | 2014–2022 | 14 |
| 4 | (Democratic Republic of the Congo) Jody Lukoki | 2015–2020 | 10 |
| 4 | (Poland) Jakub Świerczok | 2018–2021 | 10 |
| 6 | (Bulgaria) Kiril Despodov | 2020–2023 | 9 |
| 7 | (Slovenia) Roman Bezjak | 2012–2015 | 8 |
| 7 | (Ghana) **Bernard Tekpetey** | 2020– | 8 |
| 9 | (Netherlands) Virgil Misidjan | 2013–2018 | 7 |
| 9 | (Cyprus) Pieros Sotiriou | 2021–2022 | 7 |
| 9 | (Serbia) **Petar Stanić** | 2025– | 7 |

- Includes appearances in UEFA Champions League and UEFA Europa League.
- Players in **bold** are still playing for Ludogorets.

== Recent seasons ==
=== League positions ===
| Season | Position | GP | GW | GD | GL | G+ | G– | GD | Points |
|---|---|---|---|---|---|---|---|---|---|
| 2011–12 | 1° | 30 | 22 | 4 | 4 | 73 | 16 | +57 | 70 |
| 2012–13 | 1° | 30 | 22 | 6 | 2 | 58 | 13 | +45 | 72 |
| 2013–14 | 1° | 38 | 25 | 9 | 4 | 74 | 20 | +54 | 84 |
| 2014–15 | 1° | 32 | 18 | 9 | 5 | 63 | 24 | +39 | 60 |
| 2015–16 | 1° | 32 | 21 | 7 | 4 | 55 | 21 | +34 | 70 |
| 2016–17 | 1° | 36 | 25 | 8 | 3 | 87 | 28 | +59 | 83 |
| 2017–18 | 1° | 36 | 27 | 7 | 2 | 91 | 22 | +69 | 88 |
| 2018–19 | 1° | 36 | 23 | 10 | 3 | 67 | 19 | +48 | 79 |
| 2019–20 | 1° | 31 | 21 | 9 | 1 | 59 | 18 | +41 | 72 |
| 2020–21 | 1° | 31 | 22 | 4 | 5 | 69 | 29 | +40 | 70 |
| 2021–22 | 1° | 31 | 26 | 1 | 4 | 77 | 25 | +52 | 79 |
| 2022–23 | 1° | 35 | 26 | 7 | 2 | 81 | 27 | +54 | 85 |
| 2023–24 | 1° | 35 | 26 | 4 | 5 | 87 | 24 | +53 | 82 |
| 2024–25 | 1° | 36 | 25 | 8 | 3 | 70 | 22 | +48 | 83 |
| 2025–26 | 3 | 36 | 19 | 10 | 7 | 61 | 25 | +36 | 67 |
| Total | 14 Titles | 505 | 348 | 103 | 54 | 1072 | 333 | +739 | 1143 |

=== Cup history ===
| Season | Bulgarian Cup | Bulgarian Super Cup | UEFA Champions League | UEFA Europa League | UEFA Europa Conference League | Notes |
|---|---|---|---|---|---|---|
| 2010–11 | Round of 32 | did not participate | did not participate | did not participate | Not held | Promoted |
| 2011–12 | Winner | Winner | did not participate | did not participate | Not held | Achieved treble |
| 2012–13 | Round of 32 | Finalist | Second qualifying round | did not participate | Not held | 2nd consecutive title |
| 2013–14 | Winner | Winner | Play-off round | Round of 16 | Not held | Achieved treble |
| 2014–15 | Semi-final | Finalist | Group stage | did not participate | Not held | 4th consecutive title |
| 2015–16 | Round of 16 | Not held | Second qualifying round | did not participate | Not held | 5th consecutive title |
| 2016–17 | Finalist | Finalist | Group stage | Round of 32 | Not held | 6th consecutive title |
| 2017–18 | Quarter-final | Winner | Third qualifying round | Round of 32 | Not held | 7th consecutive title |
| 2018–19 | Quarter-final | Winner | Second qualifying round | Group stage | Not held | 8th consecutive title |
| 2019–20 | Quarter-final | Finalist | First qualifying round | Round of 32 | Not held | 9th consecutive title |
| 2020–21 | Semi-final | Winner | Second qualifying round | Group stage | Not held | 10th consecutive title |
| 2021–22 | Semi-final | Winner | Play-off round | Group stage | did not participate | 11th consecutive title |
| 2022–23 | Winner | Winner | Third qualifying round | Group stage | Knockout play-offs | Achieved treble |
| 2023–24 | Finalist | Winner | Second qualifying round | Play-off round | Knockout play-offs | 13th consecutive title |
| 2024–25 | Winner | Winner | Third qualifying round | League phase | did not participate | Achieved treble |
| 2025–26 | Semi-final | —N/a | Third qualifying round | Knockout phase play-offs | did not participate | —N/a |

== Rivalries ==
=== Rivalry with CSKA Sofia ===
Updated 25 May 2026

| Competition | Played | Ludogorets | Draws | CSKA | Goal Difference |
|---|---|---|---|---|---|
| First League | 46 | 24 | 17 | 5 | 62:28 |
| Bulgarian Cup | 9 | 2 | 2 | 5 | 4:10 |
| Bulgarian Supercup | 1 | 1 | 0 | 0 | 4:0 |
| Total | 56 | 27 | 19 | 10 | 71:38 |

Ludogorets win Draw CSKA win

| | | Ludogorets vs CSKA | | CSKA vs Ludogorets | |
|---|---|---|---|---|---|
League
| Season | Division / Round | Date | Score | Date | Score |
| 2011–12 | A PFG | 23 May 2012 | 1–0 | 28 November 2011 | 2–2 |
| 2012–13 | A PFG | 22 September 2012 | 1–0 | 11 April 2013 | 0–0 |
| 2013–14 | A PFG | 10 August 2013 | 3–0 | 10 November 2013 | 0–2 |
| 2013–14 | A PFG | 30 April 2014 | 1–0 | 26 March 2014 | 0–1 |
| 2014–15 | A PFG | 16 August 2014 | 2–0 | 22 November 2014 | 1–1 |
| 2014–15 | A PFG | 4 April 2015 | 4–0 | 9 May 2015 | 0–0 |
| 2016–17 | First League | 5 November 2016 | 2–1 | 1 April 2017 | 0–2 |
| 2016–17 | First League | 20 May 2017 | 1–1 | 23 April 2017 | 1–1 |
| 2017–18 | First League | 5 November 2017 | 1–2 | 22 July 2017 | 0–1 |
| 2017–18 | First League | 6 April 2018 | 3–2 | 5 May 2018 | 0–0 |
| 2018–19 | First League | 19 August 2018 | 1–0 | 6 December 2018 | 1–1 |
| 2018–19 | First League | 6 April 2019 | 0–0 | 11 May 2019 | 0–0 |
| 2019–20 | First League | 11 August 2019 | 0–0 | 1 December 2019 | 0–0 |
| 2019–20 | First League | – | – | 5 July 2020 | 1–1 |
| 2020–21 | First League | 27 February 2021 | 1–0 | 20 September 2020 | 2–2 |
| 2020–21 | First League | – | – | 12 May 2021 | 4–1 |
| 2021–22 | First League | 29 November 2021 | 2–0 | 20 December 2021 | 1–0 |
| 2021–22 | First League | 30 April 2022 | 5–0 | – | – |
| 2022–23 | First League | 10 October 2022 | 2–1 | 30 April 2023 | 0–1 |
| 2022–23 | First League | 20 May 2023 | 2–2 | – | – |
| 2023–24 | First League | 13 August 2023 | 3–0 | 10 December 2023 | 0–1 |
| 2023–24 | First League | 11 May 2024 | 3–1 | – | – |
| 2024–25 | First League | 21 July 2024 | 1–0 | 24 November 2024 | 2–2 |
| 2025–26 | First League | 14 March 2026 | 3–0 | 5 October 2025 | 0–0 |
| 2025–26 | First League | 25 May 2026 | 1–0 | 3 May 2026 | 1–0 |
Bulgarian Cup
| 2012–13 | Round of 16 | 31 October 2012 | 1–2 | 24 November 2012 | 0–1 |
| 2017–18 | Quarter-final | – | – | 14 December 2017 | 2–1 (aet) |
| 2018–19 | Quarter-final | 3 April 2019 | 0–1 | – | – |
| 2020–21 | Semi-final | 14 April 2021 | 1–2 | 7 April 2021 | 1–1 |
| 2024–25 | Final | 22 May 2025 | 1–0 | – | – |
| 2025–26 | Semi-final | 21 April 2026 | 1–2 | 29 April 2026 | 0–0 |
Bulgarian Supercup
| 2021–22 | Final | 17 July 2021 | 4–0 | – | – |

=== Rivalry with Levski Sofia ===
Updated 13 May 2026

| Competition | Played | Ludogorets | Draws | Levski | Goal Difference |
|---|---|---|---|---|---|
| First League | 48 | 30 | 12 | 6 | 71:31 |
| Bulgarian Cup | 7 | 2 | 2 | 3 | 5:6 |
| Bulgarian Supercup | 2 | 1 | 1 | 0 | 3:2 |
| Total | 57 | 33 | 15 | 9 | 79:39 |

Ludogorets win Draw Levski win

| | | Ludogorets vs Levski | | Levski vs Ludogorets | |
|---|---|---|---|---|---|
League
| Season | Division / Round | Date | Score | Date | Score |
| 2011–12 | A PFG | 25 September 2011 | 2–1 | 2 April 2012 | 0–1 |
| 2012–13 | A PFG | 18 November 2012 | 2–1 | 18 May 2013 | 1–0 |
| 2013–14 | A PFG | 7 December 2013 | 0–1 | 15 September 2013 | 0–2 |
| 2013–14 | A PFG | 9 April 2014 | 2–0 | 11 May 2014 | 2–3 |
| 2014–15 | A PFG | 8 March 2015 | 1–0 | 27 September 2014 | 3–2 |
| 2015–16 | A PFG | 1 August 2015 | 2–0 | 18 October 2015 | 1–1 |
| 2015–16 | A PFG | 21 February 2016 | 2–1 | 23 April 2016 | 0–0 |
| 2016–17 | First League | 30 November 2016 | 2–1 | 13 August 2016 | 1–0 |
| 2016–17 | First League | 14 April 2017 | 0–0 | 16 May 2017 | 1–3 |
| 2017–18 | First League | 29 October 2017 | 2–0 | 6 September 2017 | 0–0 |
| 2017–18 | First League | 12 May 2018 | 2–2 | 14 April 2018 | 0–1 |
| 2018–19 | First League | 20 October 2018 | 2–1 | 9 March 2019 | 0–2 |
| 2018–19 | First League | 18 May 2019 | 1–1 | 14 April 2019 | 0–2 |
| 2019–20 | First League | 6 October 2019 | 2–0 | 5 June 2020 | 0–1 |
| 2019–20 | First League | 8 July 2020 | 3–0 | – | – |
| 2020–21 | First League | 1 November 2020 | 1–0 | 18 April 2021 | 0–3 |
| 2021–22 | First League | 13 March 2022 | 2–1 | 3 October 2021 | 2–4 |
| 2021–22 | First League | – | – | 21 May 2022 | 0–1 |
| 2022–23 | First League | 1 December 2022 | 0–0 | 28 February 2023 | 0–0 |
| 2022–23 | First League | 3 June 2023 | 3–2 | – | – |
| 2023–24 | First League | 3 April 2024 | 5–1 | 1 October 2023 | 0–1 |
| 2023–24 | First League | – | – | 25 May 2024 | 1–0 |
| 2024–25 | First League | 17 August 2024 | 1–0 | 9 February 2025 | 2–1 |
| 2024–25 | First League | 3 May 2025 | 1–1 | 17 May 2025 | 2–2 |
| 2025–26 | First League | 5 March 2026 | 1–0 | 19 September 2025 | 0–0 |
| 2025–26 | First League | 13 May 2026 | 1–1 | 9 May 2026 | 0–1 |
Bulgarian Cup
| 2014–15 | Semi-final | 8 April 2015 | 0–0 | 29 April 2015 | 1–0 |
| 2019–20 | Quarter-final | – | – | 5 March 2020 | 0–0 (6–5p.) |
| 2021–22 | Semi-final | 13 April 2022 | 2–3 | 22 April 2022 | 1–0 |
| 2022–23 | Round of 16 | 4 December 2022 | 2–1 | – | – |
| 2025–26 | Quarter-final | 11 February 2026 | 1–0 | – | – |
Bulgarian Supercup
| 2022–23 | Final | 1 September 2022 | 2–2 (4–3p.) | – | – |
| 2024–25 | Final | 3 February 2026 | 1–0 | – | – |

== Notable players ==
Had international caps for their respective countries, or held any club record. Players whose name is listed in bold represented their countries.

Bulgaria

- (Bulgaria) **Aleksandar Aleksandrov**
- (Bulgaria) **Mihail Aleksandrov**
- (Brazil) (Bulgaria) **Cicinho**
- (Bulgaria) **Ivaylo Chochev**
- (Bulgaria) **Tsvetelin Chunchukov**
- (Bulgaria) **Spas Delev**
- (Bulgaria) **Kiril Despodov**
- (Bulgaria) **Svetoslav Dyakov**
- (Bulgaria) **Emil Gargorov**
- (Bulgaria) **Stanislav Genchev**
- (Bulgaria) **Plamen Iliev**
- (Bulgaria) **Stanislav Ivanov**
- (Bulgaria) **Georgi Kostadinov**
- (Bulgaria) **Svetoslav Kovachev**
- (Bulgaria) **Stanislav Manolev**
- (Brazil) (Bulgaria) **Marcelinho**
- (Bulgaria) **Yordan Minev**
- (Bulgaria) **Daniel Naumov**
- (Bulgaria) **Todor Nedelev**
- (Bulgaria) **Anton Nedyalkov**
- (Bulgaria) **Tsvetomir Panov**
- (Bulgaria) **Ivan Stoyanov**
- (Bulgaria) **Vladislav Stoyanov**
- (Bulgaria) **Georgi Terziev**
- (Brazil) (Bulgaria) **Wanderson**
- (Bulgaria) **Dominik Yankov**
- (Bulgaria) **Ivan Yordanov**
- (Bulgaria) **Serkan Yusein**
- (Bulgaria) **Hristo Zlatinski**
- (Serbia) (Bulgaria) **Ivan Čvorović**

Europe

- (Belgium) **Christian Kabasele**
- (Croatia) **Simon Sluga**
- (Cyprus) **Pieros Sotiriou**
- (Finland) **Tero Mäntylä**
- (Israel) **Denny Gropper**
- (Israel) **Idan Nachmias**
- (Israel) **Taleb Tawatha**
- (Montenegro) **Mladen Kašćelan**
- (Poland) **Jacek Góralski**
- (Poland) **Jakub Świerczok**
- (Poland) **Jakub Piotrowski**
- (Romania) **Cosmin Moți**
- (Romania) **Claudiu Keșerü**
- (Romania) **Andrei Prepeliță**
- (Romania) **Dragoș Grigore**
- (Romania) **Adrian Popa**
- (Romania) **Dorin Rotariu**
- (Serbia) **Petar Stanić**
- (Slovakia) **Ľubomír Guldan**
- (Slovenia) **Roman Bezjak**
- (Slovenia) **Žan Karničnik**
- (Sweden) **Edvin Kurtulus**
- (Sweden) **Joel Andersson**
- (Switzerland) **Kwadwo Duah**
- (Ukraine) **Igor Plastun**

North America

- (Canada) **Milan Borjan**

South America

- (Argentina) José Luis Palomino
- (Brazil) Júnior Caiçara
- (Brazil) Jonathan Cafu
- (Brazil) Natanael
- (Brazil) Cauly
- (Brazil) Alex Santana
- (Brazil) **Igor Thiago**
- (Colombia) **Brayan Angulo**
- (Suriname) **Shaquille Pinas**
- (Suriname) **Virgil Misidjan**

Africa

- (Angola) **Manuel Cafumana**
- (Benin) **Olivier Verdon**
- (Cape Verde) **Deroy Duarte**
- (Republic of the Congo) **Mavis Tchibota**
- (Democratic Republic of the Congo) **Jody Lukoki**
- (Democratic Republic of the Congo) **Jordan Ikoko**
- (The Gambia) **Noah Sonko Sundberg**
- (Ghana) **Bernard Tekpetey**
- (Guinea) **Aguibou Camara**
- (Guinea-Bissau) **Jorginho**
- (Madagascar) **Anicet Abel**
- (Senegal) **Stéphane Badji**
- (South Africa) **May Mahlangu**
- (Tunisia) **Hamza Younés**

== Notable coaches ==
This is a list of coaches who have won one or more titles at the club.

| Name | Years | First League | Bulgarian Cup | Bulgarian Supercup | Titles |
|---|---|---|---|---|---|
| (Bulgaria) Ivaylo Petev | 2010–2013; 2023 | 2011–12; 2012–13; 2022–23 | 2011–12; 2022–23 | 2012 | 6 |
| (Bulgaria) Stoycho Stoev | 2013–2014; 2019 | 2013–14; 2018–19 | 2013–14 | 2019 | 4 |
| (Bulgaria) Georgi Dermendzhiev | 2014–2015; 2015–2017; 2023–2024 | 2014–15; 2015–16; 2016–17; 2023–24 | | 2014; 2023 | 6 |
| (Bulgaria) Dimitar Dimitrov | 2017–2018 | 2017–18 | | | 1 |
| (Brazil) Paulo Autuori | 2018 | | | 2018 | 1 |
| (Czech Republic) Pavel Vrba | 2020 | 2019–20 | | | 1 |
| (Lithuania) Valdas Dambrauskas | 2021 | 2020–21 | | 2021 | 2 |
| (Slovenia) Ante Šimundža | 2022–2023 | 2021–22 | | 2022 | 2 |
| (Croatia) Igor Jovićević | 2024–2025; 2026– | 2024–25 | 2024–25 | 2024 | 3 |
| (Norway) Per-Mathias Høgmo | 2025–2026 | | | 2025 | 1 |
