= 2012–13 PFC Ludogorets Razgrad season =

Ludogorets Razgrad
2012–13 season
- Chairman: Aleksandar Aleksandrov
- Manager: Ivaylo Petev
- A Group: 1st (champions)
- Bulgarian Cup: Round of 32 vs CSKA Sofia
- Supercup: Winners
- Champions League: 2nd Qualifying Round vs Dinamo Zagreb
- Top goalscorer: League: Ivan Stoyanov (9); All: Ivan Stoyanov, Emil Gargorov; Marcelinho (9)
- Highest home attendance: 6,000 vs Dinamo Zagreb; 18 July 2012 & CSKA Sofia; 22 September 2012
- Lowest home attendance: 600 vs Montana; 8 December 2012
- Average home league attendance: 2,196
Home colours	Away colours

The 2012–13 season is Ludogorets Razgrad's second season in A Football Group, of which they are defending Champions. They will also take part in the Bulgarian Cup, SuperCup and enter the UEFA Champions League at the second qualifying round stage.

== Squad ==
As of match played 25 May 2013

No.	Name	Nationality	Position	Date of birth (age)	Signed from	Signed in	Contract ends	Apps.	Goals
Goalkeepers
1	Uroš Golubović	(Serbia)	GK	19 August 1976 (aged 36)	Litex Lovech	2011		43	0
21	Vladislav Stoyanov	(Bulgaria)	GK	8 June 1987 (aged 25)	Sheriff Tiraspol	2013		14	0
91	Ivan Čvorović	(Bulgaria)	GK	15 June 1985 (aged 27)	Minyor Pernik	2012		11	0
Defenders
3	Teynur Marem	(Bulgaria)	DF	24 September 1994 (aged 18)	Sliven 2000	2012		0	0
4	Tero Mäntylä	(Finland)	DF	18 April 1991 (aged 22)	Inter Turku	2012		9	0
5	Alexandre Barthe	(France)	DF	5 March 1986 (aged 27)	Litex Lovech	2011		50	6
20	Choco	(Brazil)	DF	18 January 1990 (aged 23)	Santos	2011		40	1
25	Yordan Minev	(Bulgaria)	DF	14 October 1980 (aged 32)	Botev Plovdiv	2011		60	0
26	Diyan Dimitrov	(Bulgaria)	DF					0	0
27	Cosmin Moți	(Romania)	DF	3 December 1984 (aged 28)	Dinamo București	2012		24	1
33	Ľubomír Guldan	(Slovakia)	DF	30 January 1983 (aged 30)	MŠK Žilina	2011		60	2
77	Vitinha	(Portugal)	DF	11 February 1986 (aged 27)	Concordia Chiajna	2012		16	0
80	Júnior Caiçara	(Brazil)	DF	27 April 1989 (aged 24)	Santo André	2012		33	1
Midfielders
6	Georgi Kostadinov	(Bulgaria)	MF	7 September 1990 (aged 22)	Pomorie	2012		12	2
7	Mihail Aleksandrov	(Bulgaria)	MF	11 June 1989 (aged 23)	Akademik Sofia	2010		58	14
8	Stanislav Genchev	(Bulgaria)	MF	20 March 1981 (aged 32)	Vaslui	2012		65	10
10	Sebastián Hernández	(Colombia)	MF	2 October 1986 (aged 26)	Independiente Medellín	2013		9	0
14	Mitchell Burgzorg	(Netherlands)	MF	25 July 1987 (aged 25)	Almere City	2012		12	2
15	Nemanja Milisavljević	(Serbia)	MF	11 January 1984 (aged 29)	Rapid București	2013		6	0
18	Svetoslav Dyakov	(Bulgaria)	MF	31 May 1984 (aged 28)	Lokomotiv Sofia	2012		66	4
22	Miroslav Ivanov	(Bulgaria)	MF	9 November 1991 (aged 21)	Montana	2011		73	12
23	Emil Gargorov	(Bulgaria)	MF	15 February 1991 (aged 22)	CSKA Sofia	2011		57	23
73	Ivan Stoyanov	(Bulgaria)	MF	24 July 1983 (aged 29)	Alania Vladikavkaz	2011		63	28
84	Marcelinho	(Brazil)	MF	24 August 1984 (aged 28)	Bragantino	2011		60	22
Forwards
9	Roman Bezjak	(Slovenia)	FW	21 February 1989 (aged 24)	Celje	2012		17	5
11	Juninho Quixadá	(Brazil)	FW	12 December 1985 (aged 27)	Bragantino	2011		30	8
19	Dimo Bakalov	(Bulgaria)	FW	19 December 1988 (aged 24)	Sliven	2011		34	6
Players away on loan
30	Georgi Argilashki	(Bulgaria)	GK	13 June 1991 (aged 21)	Brestnik 1948	2011		0	0
Players who left during the season
9	Miroslav Antonov	(Bulgaria)	FW	10 March 1986 (aged 27)	Levski Sofia	2011		8	3
37	Jakub Hronec	(Slovakia)	MF	5 September 1992 (aged 20)	Birmingham City	2011		0	0
99	Did'dy Guela	(Ivory Coast)	MF	19 June 1986 (aged 26)	Arminia Bielefeld	2012		17	1

=== On loan ===
Note: Flags indicate national team as defined under FIFA eligibility rules; some limited exceptions apply. Players may hold more than one non-FIFA nationality.

No.	Pos.	Nation	Player
30	GK	BUL	Georgi Argilashki (at Pirin Razlog until 30 June 2013)

== Transfers ==
=== In ===
Date	Position	Nationality	Name	From	Fee	Ref.
Summer 2012	GK	(Bulgaria)	Ivan Čvorović	Minyor Pernik	Undisclosed	
Summer 2012	DF	(Brazil)	Júnior Caiçara	Santo André	Undisclosed	
Summer 2012	DF	(Romania)	Cosmin Moți	Dinamo București	Undisclosed	
Summer 2012	MF	(Netherlands)	Mitchell Burgzorg	Almere City	Undisclosed	
Summer 2012	MF	(Ivory Coast)	Did'dy Guela	Arminia Bielefeld	Undisclosed	
Summer 2012	FW	(Slovenia)	Roman Bezjak	NK Celje	Undisclosed	
Winter 2013	GK	(Bulgaria)	Vladislav Stoyanov	Sheriff	Undisclosed	
Winter 2013	MF	(Colombia)	Sebastián Hernández	Independiente Medellín	Undisclosed	
Winter 2013	MF	(Serbia)	Nemanja Milisavljević	Rapid București	Undisclosed	

=== Out ===
Date	Position	Nationality	Name	To	Fee	Ref.
Summer 2012	GK	(Czech Republic)	Radek Petr	Zbrojovka Brno	Undisclosed	
Summer 2012	DF	(Belgium)	Christian Kabasele	Eupen	Undisclosed	
Summer 2012	MF	(Bulgaria)	Dimo Atanasov	Botev Plovdiv	Undisclosed	
Winter 2013	FW	(Bulgaria)	Miroslav Antonov	Slavia Sofia	Undisclosed	

=== Loans out ===
Start date	Position	Nationality	Name	To	End date	Ref.
Summer 2012	FW	(Bulgaria)	Miroslav Antonov	Montana	Winter 2013	
Winter 2013	GK	(Bulgaria)	Georgi Argilashki	Pirin Razlog	End of Season	

=== Released ===
Date	Position	Nationality	Name	Joined	Date
Winter 2013	MF	(Ivory Coast)	Did'dy Guela	Apollon Smyrnis	
Winter 2013	MF	(Slovakia)	Jakub Hronec	Dukla Banská Bystrica	

== Friendlies ==
2 August 2012	Everton (England)	1 – 1	(Bulgaria) Ludogorets	Liverpool
13:00 BST UTC+01:00	Baines 42'	Summary	Marcelinho 65'	Stadium: Goodison Park

== Competitions ==
=== Bulgarian Supercup ===
11 July 2012	Ludogorets	3 – 1	Lokomotiv Plovdiv	Burgas
19:30 EET	Júnior Caiçara 11'; Gargorov 43'; Marcelinho 90'	Summary	Dakson 13'	Stadium: Lazur; Attendance: 1,200; Referee: Ahmed Ahmed (Burgas)

=== A Football Group ===
==== League table ====
Pos	Team	Pld	W	D	L	GF	GA	GD	Pts	Qualification or relegation
1	Ludogorets Razgrad (C)	30	22	6	2	58	13	+45	72	Qualification for Champions League second qualifying round
2	Levski Sofia	30	22	5	3	59	20	+39	71	Qualification for Europa League first qualifying round
3	CSKA Sofia	30	19	6	5	54	20	+34	63	Excluded from European competitions (Note: PFC CSKA Sofia were excluded from European competitions due to debts.)
4	Botev Plovdiv	30	18	6	6	51	21	+30	60	Qualification for Europa League first qualifying round
5	Litex Lovech	30	15	5	10	56	24	+32	50	

Source: A PFG (in Bulgarian)
Rules for classification: 1st points; 2nd head-to-head points; 3rd head-to-head goal difference; 4th head-to-head goals scored; 5th head-to-head away goals scored; 6th goal difference; 7th goals scored
(C) Champions

==== Results summary ====
Overall								Home						Away					
Pld	W	D	L	GF	GA	GD	Pts	W	D	L	GF	GA	GD	W	D	L	GF	GA	GD
30	22	6	2	58	13	+45	72	13	2	0	33	6	+27	9	4	2	25	7	+18

Last updated: 30 May 2013.
Source: Soccerway

==== Results by round ====
Round	1	2	3	4	5	6	7	8	9	10	11	12	13	14	15	16	17	18	19	20	21	22	23	24	25	26	27	28	29	30
Ground	H	H	A	H	A	H	A	H	A	A	H	A	H	A	H	H	A	H	A	H	A	H	A	H	H	A	H	A	H	A
Result	W	W	W	W	W	W	W	W	D	L	W	D	W	W	W	W	D	D	W	D	D	W	W	W	W	W	W	L	W	W
Position	3	1	1	2	2	2	1	1	1	1	1	2	1	1	1	1	1	1	1	1	1	1	1	1	1	1	1	2	1	1

Source: Soccerway
A = Away; H = Home; W = Win; D = Draw; L = Loss

==== Results ====
11 August 2012 1	Cherno More	0 – 3	Ludogorets Razgrad	Ticha Stadium
18:00 EEST (UTC+3)	Palomino (yellow card) 34' (yellow-red card) 55'	Summary	Barthe 61'; Gargorov 74', 87'	Attendance: 6,400; Referee: Georgi Kabakov

19 August 2012 2	Ludogorets Razgrad	3 – 1	Beroe	Ludogorets Arena
20:00 EEST (UTC+3)	Barthe 29'; Stoyanov 35'; Ivanov 85' (o.g.)	Summary	Élio 62'; Elias (yellow card) 25' (red card) 83'	Attendance: 4,500; Referee: Georgie Yordanov

25 August 2012 3	Pirin Gotse Delchev	0 – 2	Ludogorets Razgrad	Gradski
18:00 EEST (UTC+3)		Summary	Marcelinho 54', 60'	Attendance: 5,100; Referee: Nikola Popov

31 August 2012 4	Ludogorets Razgrad	2 – 1	Lokomotiv Sofia	Ludogorets Arena
20:00 EEST (UTC+3)	Ivanov 8'; Gargorov 19'	Summary	Hristov 30'	Attendance: 4,000; Referee: Ivan Kirilov

16 September 2012 5	Litex Lovech	0 – 2	Ludogorets Razgrad	Lovech Stadium
20:00 EEST (UTC+3)		Summary	Gargorov 17'; Burgzorg 71'	Attendance: 2,700; Referee: Stefan Spasov

22 September 2012 6	Ludogorets Razgrad	1 – 0	CSKA Sofia	Ludogorets Arena
20:00 EEST (UTC+3)	Ivanov (yellow card) 30' (yellow-red card) 71'; Marcelinho 75'	Summary		Attendance: 6,000; Referee: Georgie Yordanov

29 September 2012 7	Lokomotiv Plovdiv	2 – 5	Ludogorets Razgrad	Lokomotiv Stadium
17:00 EEST (UTC+3)	Kurdov 57'; Abushev 80'	Summary	Marcelinho 37'; Did'dy Guela 43'; Gargorov 66', 68'; Burgzorg 90+3'	Attendance: 3,100; Referee: Ivaylo Stoyanov

5 October 2012 8	Ludogorets Razgrad	3 – 0	Minyor Pernik	Ludogorets Arena
18:00 EEST (UTC+3)	Marcelinho 24'; Stoyanov 53' (pen.); Ivanov 67' (pen.)	Summary	Vasilev (red card) 52'	Attendance: 3,200; Referee: Martin Bogdev

21 October 2012 9	Botev Vratsa	1 - 1	Ludogorets Razgrad	Hristo Botev Stadium
16:00 EEST (UTC+3)	Atanasov 63'	Summary	Genchev 14'	Attendance: 3,600; Referee: Vihren Manev

27 October 2012 10	Chernomorets Burgas	1 - 0	Ludogorets Razgrad	Lazur Stadium
18:00 EEST (UTC+3)	Palankov 30'	Summary		Attendance: 3,300; Referee: Stanislav Todorov

4 November 2012 11	Ludogorets Razgrad	4 - 0	Etar Veliko Tarnovo	Ludogorets Arena
17:30 EET (UTC+2)	Ivanov 12'; Moți 32'; Juninho 54'; Bakalov 87'	Summary		Attendance: 1,900; Referee: Tsvetan Krastev

10 November 2012 12	Slavia Sofia	0 - 0	Ludogorets Razgrad	Slavia Stadium
14:30 EET (UTC+2)		Summary		Attendance: 600; Referee: Stefan Spasov

18 November 2012 13	Ludogorets Razgrad	2 - 1	Levski Sofia	Ludogorets Arena
16:30 EET (UTC+2)	Genchev 11', 58'	Summary	Yordanov 47'	Attendance: 5,000; Referee: Nikolay Yordanov

28 November 2012 14	Botev Plovdiv	0 - 1	Ludogorets Razgrad	Stadion Botev
14:30 EET (UTC+2)		Summary	Grnčarov 69' (o.g.)	Attendance: 5,600; Referee: Tasko Taskov

8 December 2012 15	Ludogorets Razgrad	3 - 0	Montana	Ludogorets Arena
16:00 EET (UTC+2)	Guldan 33'; Stoyanov 45+1' (pen.); Aleksandrov 85'	Summary	Lahchev (red card) 45'	Attendance: 600; Referee: Stanislav Stavrov

3 March 2013 16	Ludogorets Razgrad	2 - 0	Cherno More Varna	Ludogorets Arena
18:00 EET (UTC+2)	Marcelinho 48'; Bakalov 87'	Summary		Attendance: 3,600; Referee: Georgie Yordanov

10 March 2013 17	Beroe Stara Zagora	0 - 0	Ludogorets Razgrad	Beroe Stadium
18:00 EET (UTC+2)		Summary		Attendance: 3,500; Referee: Ahmed Ahmed

16 March 2013 18	Ludogorets Razgrad	1 - 1	Pirin Gotse Delchev	Ludogorets Arena
18:00 EET (UTC+2)	Barthe 87'	[ Summary]	Bliznakov 17'	Attendance: 850; Referee: Stoyan Denev

31 March 2013 19	Lokomotiv Sofia	0 - 1	Ludogorets Razgrad	Lokomotiv Stadium
15:45 EEST (UTC+3)	Dobrev (red card) 24'	Summary	Aleksandrov 61'	Attendance: 250; Referee: Stanislav Todorov

7 April 2013 20	Ludogorets Razgrad	0 - 0	Litex Lovech	Ludogorets Arena
18:00 EEST (UTC+3)	Minev (yellow card) 24' (yellow-red card) 57'	Summary		Attendance: 2,100; Referee: Nikolay Yordanov

11 April 2013 21	CSKA Sofia	0 - 0	Ludogorets Razgrad	Bulgarian Army Stadium
19:00 EET (UTC+2)		Summary		Attendance: 6,300; Referee: Georgie Yordanov

15 April 2013 22	Ludogorets Razgrad	1 - 0	Lokomotiv Plovdiv	Ludogorets Arena
18:00 EET (UTC+2)	Juninho 87'	Summary		Attendance: 1,200; Referee: Nikola Popov

21 April 2013 23	Minyor Pernik	1 - 2	Ludogorets Razgrad	Minyor Stadium
14:00 EET (UTC+2)	Aleksandrov 83'	Summary	Bakalov 1'; Guldan 75'	Attendance: 650; Referee: Alexandre Kostadinov

27 April 2013 24	Ludogorets Razgrad	4 - 1	Botev Vratsa	Ludogorets Arena
18:00 EEST (UTC+3)	Ivanov 20'; Bakalov 30'; Aleksandrov 42'; Stoyanov 82'	Summary	Choco 85' (o.g.)	Attendance: 1,200; Referee: Martin Bogdev

3 May 2013 25	Ludogorets Razgrad	3 - 0	Chernomorets Burgas	Ludogorets Arena
16:15 EEST (UTC+3)	Bezjak 59', 77'; Stoyanov 68'	Summary		Attendance: 1,800; Referee: Tsvetan Krastev

7 May 2013 26	Etar	1 - 5	Ludogorets Razgrad	Ivaylo Stadium
18:00 EEST (UTC+3)	Cienciała 90+1'	Summary	Dyakov 43', 44'; Stoyanov 62', 77'; Bezjak 70'	Attendance: 200; Referee: Kalin Lyudmilov

11 May 2013 27	Ludogorets Razgrad	2 - 1	Slavia Sofia	Ludogorets Arena
15:30 EEST (UTC+3)	Bezjak 5', 23'	Summary	Ivanov 70'	Attendance: 1,600; Referee: Radoslav Stanev

18 May 2013 28	Levski Sofia	1 - 0	Ludogorets Razgrad	Georgi Asparuhov Stadium
20:00 EEST (UTC+3)	Burgzorg 90+2' (o.g.)	Summary	Guldan (yellow card) 39' (yellow-red card) 85'	Attendance: 9,600; Referee: Georgie Yordanov

22 May 2013 29	Ludogorets Razgrad	2 - 0	Botev Plovdiv	Ludogorets Arena
20:00 EEST (UTC+3)	Stoyanov 8' (pen.), 20'	Summary		Attendance: 3,100; Referee: Martin Bogdev

25 May 2013 30	Montana	0 - 3	Ludogorets Razgrad	Ogosta Stadium
18:00 EEST (UTC+3)		Summary	Dyakov 30'; Aleksandrov 68', 75'	Attendance: 440; Referee: Vladimir Valkov

=== Bulgarian Cup ===
31 October 2012 Round of 32 1st Leg	Ludogorets Razgrad	1 – 2	CSKA Sofia	Razgrad
20:45 EET (UTC+2)	Ivanov 11' (yellow card) 82'	Report	Platini 35' (yellow card) 58'; Abel (yellow card) 37' (yellow-red card) 90+2'; Bandalovski (yellow card) 58'; Lucas Sasha 61'; Krachunov (yellow card) 68'	Stadium: Ludogorets Arena; Referee: Hristo Ristoskov

24 November 2012 Round of 32 2nd Leg	CSKA Sofia	0 – 1 ((a)2 – 2 agg.)	Ludogorets Razgrad	Sofia
13:30 EET (UTC+2)	Priso (red card) 19'; Venkov (yellow card) 86'; Černý (yellow card) 90+3'	Report	Júnior Caiçara (yellow card) 19' (yellow-red card) 69'; Genchev (yellow card) 27'; Choco (yellow card) 50'; Moți (yellow card) 50'; Gargorov 78'	Stadium: Balgarska Armia Stadium; Referee: Stanislav Todorov

=== Champions League ===
==== Second qualifying round ====
18 July 2012 1st Leg	Ludogorets (Bulgaria)	1 – 1	(Croatia) Dinamo Zagreb	Razgrad
21:00 EEST (UTC+3)	Marcelinho 67'	Report	Vida 90+3'	Stadium: Ludogorets Arena; Attendance: 6,000; Referee: Radek Příhoda (Czech Republic)

25 July 2012 2nd Leg	Dinamo Zagreb (Croatia)	3 - 2 (4 - 3 agg.)	(Bulgaria) Ludogorets	Zagreb
21:45 EEST (UTC+3)	Rukavina 33', 60'; Vida 90+8'	Report	Gargorov 12'; Marcelinho 36'; Marcelinho (yellow card) 32' (yellow-red card) 57'; Ivanov (yellow card) 90+8' (red card) 90+8'	Stadium: Stadion Maksimir; Attendance: 25,000; Referee: Felix Zwayer (Germany)

== Squad statistics ==
As of match played 25 May 2013

=== Appearances and goals ===
No.	Pos	Nat	Player	Total		A Group		Bulgarian Cup		Supercup		Champions League	
No.	Pos	Nat	Player	Apps	Goals	Apps	Goals	Apps	Goals	Apps	Goals	Apps	Goals
1	GK	(Serbia) SRB	Uroš Golubović	10	0	6	0	1	0	1	0	2	0
4	DF	(Finland) FIN	Tero Mäntylä	5	0	5	0	0	0	0	0	0	0
5	DF	(France) FRA	Alexandre Barthe	18	3	14	3	1	0	1	0	2	0
6	MF	(Bulgaria) BUL	Georgi Kostadinov	7	0	2+4	0	0	0	1	0	0	0
7	MF	(Bulgaria) BUL	Mihail Aleksandrov	17	5	7+8	5	0	0	0+1	0	0+1	0
8	MF	(Bulgaria) BUL	Stanislav Genchev	33	3	25+3	3	2	0	1	0	2	0
9	FW	(Slovenia) SLO	Roman Bezjak	17	5	5+9	5	0+1	0	0	0	0+2	0
10	MF	(Colombia) COL	Sebastián Hernández	9	0	3+6	0	0	0	0	0	0	0
11	FW	(Brazil) BRA	Juninho	18	3	8+9	3	0+1	0	0	0	0	0
14	MF	(Netherlands) NED	Mitchell Burgzorg	12	2	2+10	2	0	0	0	0	0	0
15	MF	(Serbia) SRB	Nemanja Milisavljević	6	0	1+5	0	0	0	0	0	0	0
18	MF	(Bulgaria) BUL	Svetoslav Dyakov	32	3	28	3	2	0	0	0	2	0
19	MF	(Bulgaria) BUL	Dimo Bakalov	17	4	4+11	4	0+1	0	0	0	0+1	0
20	DF	(Brazil) BRA	Choco	8	0	5+1	0	2	0	0	0	0	0
21	GK	(Bulgaria) BUL	Vladislav Stoyanov	14	0	14	0	0	0	0	0	0	0
22	MF	(Bulgaria) BUL	Miroslav Ivanov	31	5	25+1	4	2	1	1	0	2	0
23	MF	(Bulgaria) BUL	Emil Gargorov	27	9	18+4	6	2	1	1	1	2	1
25	DF	(Bulgaria) BUL	Yordan Minev	27	0	23+1	0	0	0	1	0	2	0
27	DF	(Romania) ROU	Cosmin Moți	24	1	19+2	1	1	0	0	0	0+2	0
33	DF	(Slovakia) SVK	Ľubomír Guldan	27	2	22	2	2	0	1	0	2	0
73	MF	(Bulgaria) BUL	Ivan Stoyanov	33	9	23+5	9	1+1	0	1	0	2	0
77	DF	(Portugal) POR	Vitinha	5	0	4	0	0+1	0	0	0	0	0
80	DF	(Brazil) BRA	Júnior Caiçara	33	1	28	0	2	0	1	1	2	0
84	MF	(Brazil) BRA	Marcelinho	30	9	24+1	6	2	0	1	1	2	2
91	GK	(Bulgaria) BUL	Ivan Čvorović	11	0	10	0	1	0	0	0	0	0
Players who appeared for Ludogorets Razgrad that left during the season:
99	MF	(Ivory Coast) CIV	Did'dy Guela	17	1	5+8	1	1	0	0+1	0	0+2	0

=== Goal scorers ===
Place	Position	Nation	Number	Name	A Group	Bulgarian Cup	Supercup	Champions League	Total
1	MF	(Bulgaria)	73	Ivan Stoyanov	9	0	0	0	9
1	MF	(Bulgaria)	23	Emil Gargorov	6	1	1	1	9
1	FW	(Brazil)	84	Marcelinho	6	0	1	2	9
4	FW	(Slovenia)	9	Roman Bezjak	5	0	0	0	5
4	MF	(Bulgaria)	7	Mihail Aleksandrov	5	0	0	0	5
4	MF	(Bulgaria)	22	Miroslav Ivanov	4	1	0	0	5
7	MF	(Bulgaria)	19	Dimo Bakalov	4	0	0	0	4
8	MF	(Bulgaria)	8	Stanislav Genchev	3	0	0	0	3
8	DF	(France)	5	Alexandre Barthe	3	0	0	0	3
8	MF	(Bulgaria)	18	Svetoslav Dyakov	3	0	0	0	3
11	MF	(Netherlands)	14	Mitchell Burgzorg	2	0	0	0	2
11	MF	(Brazil)	11	Juninho	2	0	0	0	2
11	DF	(Slovakia)	33	Ľubomír Guldan	2	0	0	0	2
11				Own goal	2	0	0	0	2
15	MF	(Ivory Coast)	99	Did'dy Guela	1	0	0	0	1
15	DF	(Brazil)	80	Júnior Caiçara	0	0	1	0	1
15	DF	(Romania)	27	Cosmin Moți	1	0	0	0	1
				TOTALS	58	2	3	3	66

=== Disciplinary record ===
Number	Nation	Position	Name	A Group		Bulgarian Cup		Supercup		Champions League		Total	
Number	Nation	Position	Name	Yellow card	Red card	Yellow card	Red card	Yellow card	Red card	Yellow card	Red card	Yellow card	Red card
1	(Serbia)	GK	Uroš Golubović	0	0	0	0	0	0	1	0	1	0
4	(Finland)	DF	Tero Mäntylä	1	0	0	0	0	0	0	0	1	0
5	(France)	DF	Alexandre Barthe	3	0	0	0	1	0	2	0	5	0
6	(Bulgaria)	MF	Georgi Kostadinov	2	0	0	0	1	0	0	0	3	0
7	(Bulgaria)	MF	Mihail Aleksandrov	2	0	0	0	0	0	0	0	2	0
8	(Bulgaria)	MF	Stanislav Genchev	5	0	1	0	1	0	0	0	7	0
11	(Brazil)	MF	Juninho	3	0	0	0	0	0	0	0	3	0
14	(Netherlands)	MF	Mitchell Burgzorg	1	0	0	0	0	0	0	0	1	0
18	(Bulgaria)	MF	Svetoslav Dyakov	7	0	0	0	0	0	1	0	8	0
20	(Brazil)	DF	Choco	0	0	1	0	0	0	0	0	1	0
21	(Bulgaria)	GK	Vladislav Stoyanov	2	0	0	0	0	0	0	0	2	0
22	(Bulgaria)	MF	Miroslav Ivanov	8	1	1	0	1	0	2	1	10	2
23	(Bulgaria)	MF	Emil Gargorov	0	0	0	0	0	0	1	0	1	0
25	(Bulgaria)	DF	Yordan Minev	10	1	0	0	0	0	0	0	10	1
27	(Romania)	DF	Cosmin Moți	6	0	1	0	0	0	0	0	7	0
33	(Slovakia)	DF	Ľubomír Guldan	4	1	0	0	0	0	0	0	4	1
73	(Bulgaria)	MF	Ivan Stoyanov	3	0	0	0	0	0	0	0	3	0
77	(Portugal)	DF	Vitinha	1	0	0	0	0	0	0	0	1	0
80	(Brazil)	DF	Júnior Caiçara	5	0	2	1	1	0	1	0	8	1
84	(Brazil)	FW	Marcelinho	4	0	0	0	0	0	2	1	6	1
Players who left Ludogorets Razgrad during the season:
99	(Ivory Coast)	MF	Did'dy Guela	1	0	0	0	0	0	1	0	2	0
			TOTALS	68	3	6	1	5	0	11	2	90	6
