= 2012 Bulgarian Cup final =

- Event: 2011–12 Bulgarian Cup
Lokomotiv Plovdiv	Ludogorets
A PFG	A PFG
1	2
- Date: 16 May 2012
- Venue: Lazur, Burgas
- Man of the Match: Marcelinho
- Referee: Stanislav Todorov
- Attendance: 13,103

The 2012 Bulgarian Cup final was the 72nd final of the Bulgarian Cup, and was contested between Lokomotiv Plovdiv and Ludogorets Razgrad on 16 May 2012.

Ludogorets won the final 2–1, claiming their first Bulgarian Cup title. After Dakson opened the scoring after 18 minutes, Marcelinho equalised in the 72nd minute and scored second and winner, seven minutes later.

== Route to the final ==
=== Lokomotiv Plovdiv ===
Round	Opposition	Score
Second	Chavdar Etropole (a)	0–2
Third	Dobrudzha Dobrich (a)	0–4
Quarter-final	Levski Sofia (h)	2–1 (aet)
Semi-final	Litex Lovech (a)	0–1

As an A PFG team, Lokomotiv Plovdiv entered the competition in the second round. Their opening match was a 2–0 away win against Chavdar Etropole. Mihail Venkov struck early in the first half, before Sergihno hit second in the 76th minute. Lokomotiv then travelled to face Dobrudzha Dobruch at Druzhba Stadium in the third round. Dragi Kotsev scored a hattrick and Jérémie Rodrigues netted one for a 4–0 win.

Lokomotiv were drawn to play at home against Levski Sofia in the fourth round, with Levski dominating the first half through a Toni Calvo goal. Mihail Venkov scored a header in stoppage time for a 1–1. Venkov's goal meant the match was now drawn at 1–1 and with no further goals the match went into extra-time. Zdravko Lazarov scored second goal in the 92nd minute to give Lokomotiv a 2–1 victory and ensure their place in the semi-finals. Litex Lovech were the opponents in the semi-final. Youness Bengelloun headed in the 79th minute to give Lokomotiv a 1–0 victory and secure their place in the final for the first time since 1982.

=== Ludogorets ===
Round	Opposition	Score
Second	Beroe (a)	0–1 (aet)
Third	Svetkavitsa (h)	5–1
Quarter-final	Botev Plovdiv (a)	0–3
Semi-final	Septemvri Simitli (a)	1–4

Ludogorets – also an A PFG team – entered the competition in the second round too, where they were drawn at away to Beroe Stara Zagora. After a goalless 90 minutes, Miroslav Ivanov scored a winning goal in the extra-time. In the third round, their opponents were Svetkavitsa, whom Ludogorets beat 5–1 at Ludogorets Arena, courtesy of goals from Stanislav Genchev, Marcelinho, Emil Gargorov, Christian Kabasele and Ivan Stoyanov.

Ludogorets's fourth round match was against Botev Plovdiv at the Hristo Botev Stadium in Plovdiv. Ludogorets took the lead after less than 22 minutes through Marcelinho, and further goals from Mihail Aleksandrov and Kabasele resulted in a comfortable 3–0 win. In the semi-final, Ludogorets beat Septemvri Simitli comfortably, winning 4–1. Ludogorets took a two-goal lead in less than an hour after goals from Stoyanov and Kabasele. Own goal by Tero Mäntylä in the 59th minute made the score 2–1, but Stoyanov and Aleksandrov scored in the last 15 minutes to complete the win. The margin of victory was the biggest in a Bulgarian Cup round of 16 since 2011, and secured Ludogorets's first Bulgarian Cup Final.

== Pre-match ==
Lokomotiv Plovdiv were appearing in the final for the fourth time and in all times had been beaten (in 1948, 1960, 1971 and 1982). Ludogorets were making their first appearance in the final. Their previous best was participation in the Round of 16, which had occurred one time.

Shumen-based referee Stanislav Todorov was named as the referee for the 2012 Bulgarian Cup Final on 16 May 2012. His assistants for the final were Nikolay Petrov and Georgi Slavov, with Ivaylo Stoyanov as the fourth official.

== Match ==
=== Details ===
16 May 2012
19:00 EET

Lokomotiv Plovdiv	1–2	Ludogorets Razgrad
Dakson 18'		Marcelinho 72', 79'

Lazur, Burgas
Attendance: 13,103
Referee: Stanislav Todorov (Shumen)

Lokomotiv	Ludogorets

Lokomotiv:
GK	12	(Bulgaria) Ivan Karadzhov
RB	2	(France) Jérémie Rodrigues	(yellow card) 73'
CB	5	(France) Youness Bengelloun	(red card) 89'
LB	4	(Bulgaria) Mihail Venkov
CB	6	(Bulgaria) Tanko Dyakov		(substituted off) 52'
DM	16	(Bulgaria) Hristo Zlatinski		(substituted off) 83'
RM	23	(Bulgaria) Daniel Georgiev
AM	87	(Brazil) Dakson		(substituted off) 60'
LM	10	(Portugal) Serginho	(yellow card) 64'
SS	11	(Bulgaria) Zdravko Lazarov (c)	(yellow card) 62'
CF	19	(Guinea-Bissau) Basile de Carvalho
Substitutes:
GK	1	(Bulgaria) Stoyan Stavrev
DF	3	(Bulgaria) Valeri Georgiev
MF	7	(Bulgaria) Yordan Todorov		(substituted on) 83'
MF	11	(Bulgaria) Ilian Yordanov
DF	25	(Bulgaria) Angel Yoshev		(substituted on) 52'
MF	29	(North Macedonia) Dragi Kotsev
MF	44	(Bulgaria) Lyubomir Vitanov		(substituted on) 60'
Manager:
(Bulgaria) Emil Velev

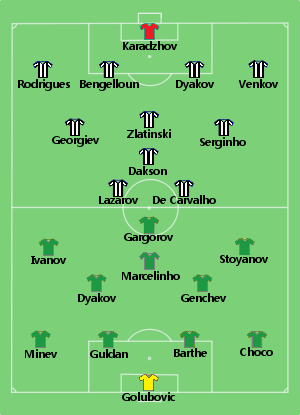

Ludogorets:
GK	1	(Serbia) Uroš Golubović
RB	20	(Brazil) Guilherme Choco
CB	33	(Slovakia) Ľubomír Guldan	(yellow card) 27'
LB	25	(Bulgaria) Yordan Minev	(yellow card) 81'
CB	5	(France) Alexandre Barthe
CM	18	(Bulgaria) Svetoslav Dyakov
CM	8	(Bulgaria) Stanislav Genchev
RM	73	(Bulgaria) Ivan Stoyanov		(substituted off) 90'
LM	22	(Bulgaria) Miroslav Ivanov	(yellow card) 45'	(substituted off) 59'
AM	84	(Brazil) Marcelinho
CF	23	(Bulgaria) Emil Gargorov (c)
Substitutes:
GK	13	(Czech Republic) Radek Petr
DF	4	(Finland) Tero Mäntylä
MF	7	(Bulgaria) Mihail Aleksandrov		(substituted on) 59'
MF	19	(Bulgaria) Dimo Bakalov		(substituted on) 90'
FW	27	(Belgium) Christian Kabasele
MF	36	(Montenegro) Mladen Kašćelan
DF	77	(Portugal) Vitinha
Manager:
(Bulgaria) Ivaylo Petev

MAN OF THE MATCH

- Marcelinho

MATCH OFFICIALS

- Assistant referees:
  - Nikolay Petrov
  - Georgi Slavov
- Fourth official: Ivaylo Stoyanov

MATCH RULES

- 90 minutes.
- 30 minutes of extra-time if necessary.
- Penalty shoot-out if scores still level.
- Seven named substitutes.
- Maximum of three substitutions.

== See also ==
- 2011–12 A Group
