= Minev =

Minev (Bulgarian: Минев) is a Bulgarian male surname, its feminine counterpart is Mineva. It may refer to

- Nikolay Minev (born 1931), Bulgarian chess player
- Plamen Minev (born 1965), Bulgarian hammer thrower
- Veselin Minev (born 1980), Bulgarian association football player
- Yordan Minev (born 1980), Bulgarian association football player
- Nevena Mineva (born 1972), Bulgarian Olympic race walker
