= Júnior Caiçara =

Brazilian footballer

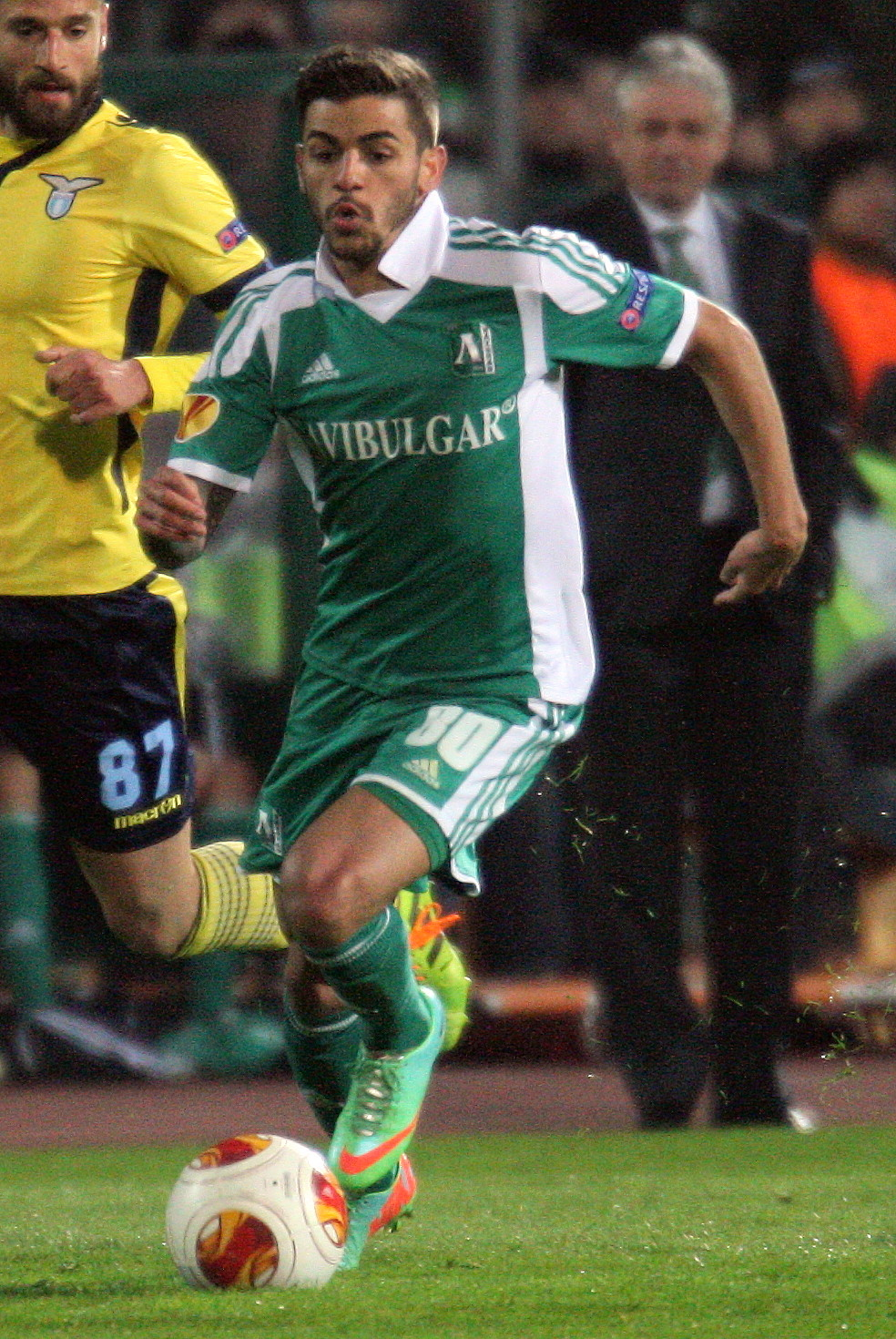
- Caiçara with Ludogorets Razgrad in 2014

Personal information
- Full name: Uilson de Souza Paula Júnior
- Date of birth: 27 April 1989 (age 37)
- Place of birth: Santos, Brazil
- Height: 1.72 m (5 ft 8 in)
- Position: Right-back

Team information
- Current team: Santo André

Youth career
- 2005–2007: São Vicente
- 2007–2008: Santo André

Senior career*
Years	Team	Apps	(Gls)
2008–2012	Santo André	1	(0)
2009	→ CSA (loan)	6	(0)
2010	→ América-SP (loan)	4	(0)
2010–2012	→ Gil Vicente (loan)	56	(1)
2012–2015	Ludogorets Razgrad	83	(0)
2015–2017	Schalke 04	26	(0)
2017–2023	İstanbul Başakşehir	158	(2)
2023	Santos	5	(0)
2024–	Santo André	0	(0)
- * Club domestic league appearances and goals as of 14:10, 14 November 2023 (UTC)

Uilson de Souza Paula Júnior (born 27 April 1989), commonly known as Júnior Caiçara, is a Brazilian footballer who plays as a right-back for Santo André.

== Career ==
=== Santo André and loans ===
Caiçara's first professional club is Santo André. In 2009, after making his senior debut with their B-team in the previous year's Copa Paulista, he was loaned out to Brazilian team CSA.

Back to Santo André in May 2009, Júnior Caiçara made his Série A debut on 16 May, starting and being sent off in a 4–2 away win over Coritiba. In 2010, he was sent on loan to América-SP, where he featured in four Campeonato Paulista Série A2 matches before being released on 10 February.

In June 2010, Caiçara goes to Portugal team Gil Vicente again on loan from Santo André. He made his debut on 29 August against Trofense in the second Portugal league. He helped his team to gain promotion in the Primeira Liga and played with the team in their return in Primeira Liga.

=== Ludogorets Razgrad ===
After playing two seasons for Gil Vicente in Portugal, Júnior Caiçara joined Bulgarian side Ludogorets Razgrad on 5 June 2012. He signed a three-year contract and was given the number 80 jersey.

On 11 July, Caiçara marked his debut for Ludogorets with a goal and first trophy. He opened the scoring in the 2012 Bulgarian Supercup against Lokomotiv Plovdiv, the match ended 3–1 to Ludogorets. On 18 July, he made his European debut against Dinamo Zagreb in the second qualifying round of the Champions League. Then he made his Bulgarian A Group debut, playing full 90 minutes in a 3–0 away win over Cherno More Varna on 11 August. Caiçara quickly established himself as Ludogorets's first choice right-back, making 28 league appearances during his debut campaign in Bulgaria. He collected his first A group title winner's medal at the end of the 2012–13 season.

On 21 August 2013, Caiçara was sent off against Basel in a 4–2 home defeat in the play-off round of the Champions League, his first red card in a Ludogorets shirt.

On 12 December 2014, Ludogorets announced that Caiçara had extended his contract with a new two-year deal that will keep him at the club until 2017.

=== Schalke 04 ===
On 25 June 2015, Caiçara signed with German club Schalke 04 on a three-year deal for a fee of €4.5 million. He made his Bundesliga debut in a 1–1 draw with Darmstadt 98.

=== İstanbul Başakşehir ===
On 16 January 2017, Caiçara signed with Turkish club İstanbul Başakşehir F.K. on a 3.5-year deal for an undisclosed fee. Three days later he made his debut for the team in the Turkish Cup coming as a substitute in the 61 minute in a match against Yeni Amasyaspor. On 22 January, he completed his debut for the team coming as a substitute again in a match against Fenerbahçe in the Süper Lig.

On 19 February 2023, Caiçara terminated his contract with the club.

=== Santos ===
On 21 August 2023, Caiçara returned to his home country after signing a contract with Santos in the top tier until the end of the year.

=== Santo André return ===
On 3 January 2024, Caiçara returned to Santo André for the season.

== International career ==
Caicara is eligible for both Brazil and Bulgaria since on 1 July 2014 he got a Bulgarian passport and became able to play for Bulgaria from 2017. He said that he would be happy to represent Bulgaria on the international level. On 25 February 2017, he mentioned again that he would represent Bulgaria if he got an invite since the old manager, Ivaylo Petev, wanted him, and he is waiting for a call from Petar Hubchev.

== Career statistics ==
As of 14 November 2023

Club performance			League		State League (Note: Includes Campeonato Alagoano and Campeonato Paulista Série A2)		Cup (Note: Includes Copa do Brasil, Taça de Portugal, DFB-Pokal, Bulgarian Cup and Turkish Cup)		League Cup (Note: Includes Taça da Liga)		Continental (Note: Includes UEFA Champions League, UEFA Europa League and UEFA Europa Conference League)		Other (Note: Includes Copa Paulista and Bulgarian Supercup)		Total	
Club	Season	League	Apps	Goals	Apps	Goals	Apps	Goals	Apps	Goals	Apps	Goals	Apps	Goals	Apps	Goals
Santo André	2008	Série B	0	0	0	0	0	0	—		—		10	0	10	0
Santo André	2009	Série A	1	0	—		0	0	—		—		—		1	0
Santo André	Total		1	0	0	0	0	0	—		—		10	0	11	0
CSA (loan)	2009	Série D	0	0	6	0	2	0	—		—		—		8	0
América-SP (loan)	2010	Paulista A2	—		4	0	—		—		—		—		4	0
Gil Vicente (loan)	2010–11	Segunda Liga	28	1	—		1	0	6	1	—		—		35	2
Gil Vicente (loan)	2011–12	Primeira Liga	28	0	—		1	0	6	1	—		—		35	1
Gil Vicente (loan)	Total		56	1	—		2	0	12	2	—		—		70	3
Ludogorets Razgrad	2012–13	A Group	28	0	—		0	0	—		2	0	1	1	31	1
Ludogorets Razgrad	2013–14	A Group	29	0	—		8	0	—		15	0	1	0	53	0
Ludogorets Razgrad	2014–15	A Group	26	0	—		6	0	—		11	0	1	0	44	0
Ludogorets Razgrad	Total		83	0	—		14	0	—		28	0	3	1	128	1
Schalke 04	2015–16	Bundesliga	23	0	—		2	0	—		7	0	—		32	0
Schalke 04	2016–17	Bundesliga	3	0	—		2	0	—		4	1	—		9	1
Schalke 04	Total		26	0	—		4	0	—		11	1	0	0	41	1
İstanbul Başakşehir	2016–17	Süper Lig	14	0	—		4	0	—		0	0	—		18	0
İstanbul Başakşehir	2017–18	Süper Lig	31	0	—		1	0	—		10	0	—		42	0
İstanbul Başakşehir	2018–19	Süper Lig	33	0	—		2	0	—		2	0	—		37	0
İstanbul Başakşehir	2019–20	Süper Lig	33	0	—		0	0	—		11	0	—		44	0
İstanbul Başakşehir	2020–21	Süper Lig	8	0	—		0	0	—		1	0	—		9	0
İstanbul Başakşehir	2021–22	Süper Lig	27	2	—		1	0	—		0	0	—		28	2
İstanbul Başakşehir	2022–23	Süper Lig	10	0	—		0	0	—		9	0	—		19	2
İstanbul Başakşehir	Total		156	2	—		8	0	—		33	0	0	0	197	2
Santos	2023	Série A	5	0	—		—		—		—		—		5	0
Santo André	2024	Série D	0	0	0	0	—		—		—		—		0	0
Career total			327	3	10	0	30	0	12	2	72	1	13	1	464	7

== Honours ==
=== Club ===
Gil Vicente

- Liga de Honra: 2010–11
- Taça da Liga Runner-up: 2011–12

Ludogorets Razgrad

- Bulgarian A Group: 2012–13, 2013–14, 2014–15
- Bulgarian Cup: 2013–14
- Bulgarian Supercup: 2012

İstanbul Başakşehir

- Süper Lig: 2019–20
