= 2012 Bulgarian Supercup =

Финал за Суперкупата на България 2012
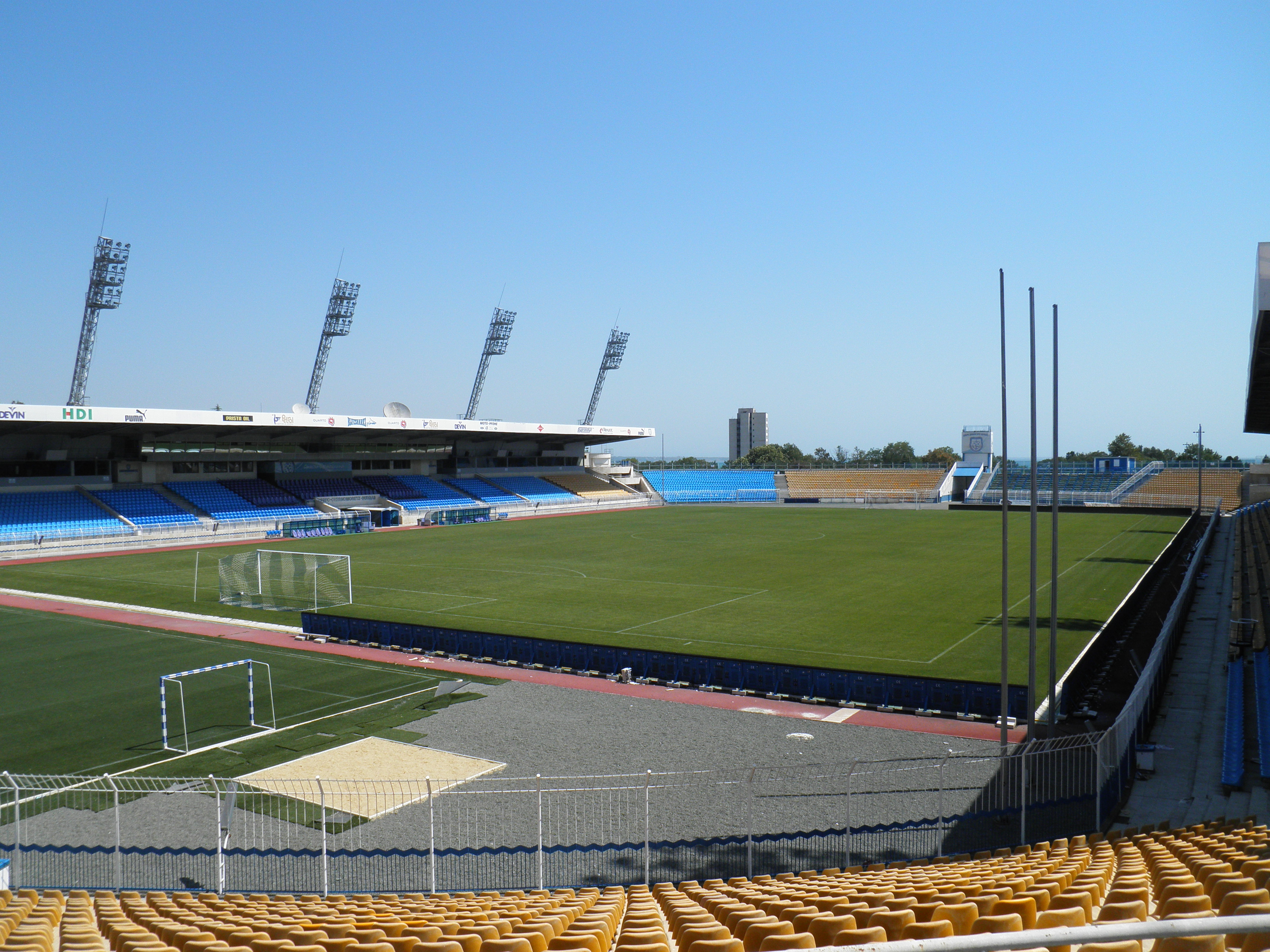
| Ludogorets | Lokomotiv Plovdiv |
| A Group | Bulgarian Cup |
| 3 | 1 |
- Date: 11 July 2012
- Venue: Lazur, Burgas
- Referee: Ahmed Ahmed (Burgas)
- Attendance: 2,000

The 2012 Bulgarian Supercup was the tenth Bulgarian Supercup match, a football match which was contested between the "A" professional football group champion, Ludogorets, and the runner-up of the Bulgarian Cup, Lokomotiv Plovdiv. As the Bulgarian Cup winner for 2012 was also the team of Ludogorets, Lokomotiv Plovdiv therefore played in the Supercup match as the finalist. The match was played on 11 July 2012 at the Lazur Stadium in Burgas, Bulgaria.

This was the first Supercup final for Ludogorets in their history. While for Lokomotiv Plovdiv this was their second participation after 2004 when they won the Cup after a 1:0 win against Litex Lovech.

Ludogorets secured their first Bulgarian Supercup. Júnior Caiçara gave the lead before Dakson equalised from a freekick for Lokomotiv Plovdiv. Goals from Emil Gargorov and Marcelinho in the last minute clinched the first Supercup for the Razgrad side and also achieving their first treble in one season after winning the title and the national cup the same year.

== Match details ==
11 July 2012
19:30 EET

| Ludogorets Razgrad | 3−1 | Lokomotiv Plovdiv |
|---|---|---|
| Caiçara 10'; Gargorov 43'; Marcelinho 90' | Report | Dakson 12' |

Lazur, Burgas
Attendance: 2,000
Referee: Ahmed Ahmed (Burgas)

| Ludogorets | Lokomotiv |

Ludogorets:
| GK | 1 | (Serbia) Uroš Golubović |
| RB | 25 | (Bulgaria) Yordan Minev |
| CB | 5 | (France) Alexandre Barthe |
| CB | 33 | (Slovakia) Ľubomír Guldan |
| LB | 80 | (Brazil) Júnior Caiçara | (yellow card) 24' |
| CM | 6 | (Bulgaria) Georgi Kostadinov | (yellow card) 68' |
| CM | 8 | (Bulgaria) Stanislav Genchev |
| RM | 73 | (Bulgaria) Ivan Stoyanov | | (substituted off) 71' |
| LM | 22 | (Bulgaria) Miroslav Ivanov | (yellow card) 40' | (substituted off) 81' |
| AM | 84 | (Brazil) Marcelinho |
| CF | 23 | (Bulgaria) Emil Gargorov (c) |
Substitutes:
| GK | 91 | (Bulgaria) Ivan Čvorović |
| MF | 7 | (Bulgaria) Mihail Aleksandrov | | (substituted in) 81' |
| FW | 11 | (Brazil) Juninho Quixadá |
| MF | 14 | (Netherlands) Mitchell Burgzorg |
| DF | 20 | (Brazil) Guilherme Choco |
| DF | 27 | (Romania) Cosmin Moți |
| MF | 99 | (Ivory Coast) Franck Guela | | (substituted in) 71' |
Manager:
(Bulgaria) Ivaylo Petev

Lokomotiv:
| GK | 22 | (Bulgaria) Yordan Gospodinov |
| RB | 2 | (France) Jérémie Rodrigues | | (substituted off) 84' |
| CB | 3 | (Bulgaria) Valeri Georgiev |
| LB | 4 | (Bulgaria) Mihail Venkov |
| CB | 44 | (Greece) Georgios Salamastrakis |
| CM | 23 | (Bulgaria) Daniel Georgiev | (yellow card) 41' | (substituted off) 57' |
| RM | 7 | (Bulgaria) Yordan Todorov | | (substituted off) 69' |
| LM | 10 | (Portugal) Serginho |
| AM | 87 | (Brazil) Dakson | (yellow card) 37' |
| SS | 77 | (Bulgaria) Zdravko Lazarov (c) | | (substituted off) 59' |
| CF | 9 | (Brazil) Tássio |
Substitutes:
| GK | 1 | (Bulgaria) Minko Zhilkov |
| MF | 11 | (Bulgaria) Ilian Yordanov |
| MF | 16 | (Bulgaria) Hristo Zlatinski | (yellow card) 72' | (substituted in) 57' |
| DF | 24 | (Brazil) Eli Marques | | (substituted in) 59' |
| MF | 29 | (North Macedonia) Dragi Kotsev | | (substituted in) 84' |
| MF | 33 | (Bulgaria) Todor Timonov | | (substituted in) 69' |
| FW | 71 | (Bulgaria) Hristo Spasov |
| MF | 89 | (Bulgaria) Stanislav Malamov |
Manager:
(Bulgaria) Emil Velev

MATCH OFFICIALS

- Assistant referees:
  - Georgi Kovachev (Burgas)
  - Stanimir Ilkov (Burgas)
- Fourth official: Atanas Dimitrov (Sliven)

MATCH RULES

- 90 minutes.
- 30 minutes of extra-time if necessary.
- Penalty shoot-out if scores still level.
- Seven named substitutes.
- Maximum of five substitutions.
