= Alexandre Barthe =

French footballer (born 1986)

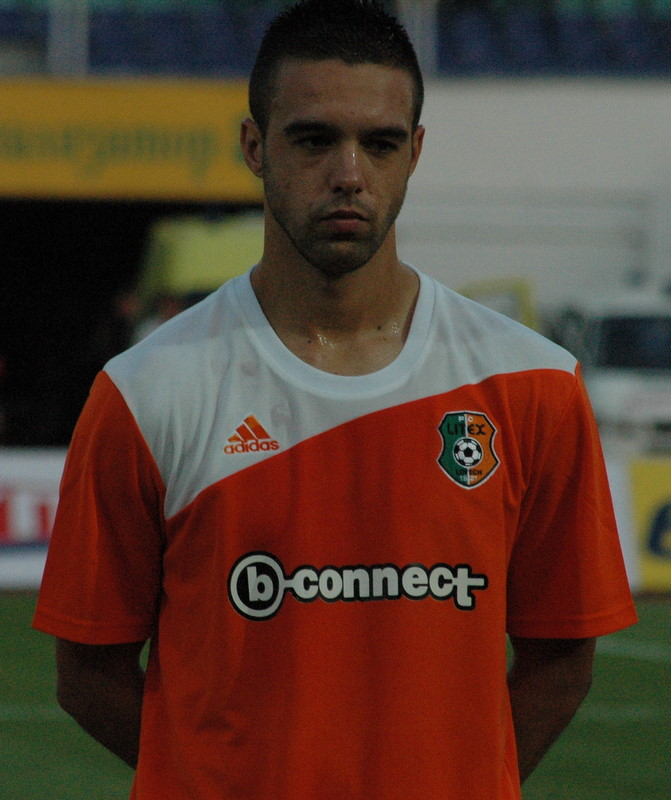
- Barthe with Litex Lovech in 2009

Personal information
- Full name: Alexandre Jean-Luc Barthe
- Date of birth: 5 March 1986 (age 40)
- Place of birth: Avignon, France
- Height: 1.84 m (6 ft 0 in)
- Position: Defender

Youth career
- Saint-Étienne

Senior career*
Years	Team	Apps	(Gls)
2004–2006	Saint-Étienne B	42	(2)
2006–2008	Rodez AF	70	(7)
2008–2011	Litex Lovech	72	(5)
2011–2015	Ludogorets Razgrad	73	(8)
2015–2016	Grasshoppers	11	(0)
2017	Universitatea Craiova	15	(0)
2017–2018	CSKA Sofia	16	(1)
Total		299	(23)
- * Club domestic league appearances and goals

Alexandre Barthe (born 5 March 1986) is a French former professional footballer who played as a defender. He has won the Bulgarian league championship on six occasions in a row (2010–11, 2011–12, 2012–13, 2013–14, 2014–15, and 2015–16).

== Career ==
Barthe started his club career with Saint-Étienne, representing however only its B-team. In 2006, he joined Rodez AF and helped the team to gain promotion to Championnat National during a 2006–07 season.

=== Litex Lovech ===
On 11 July 2008, Barthe signed a four-year contract with Bulgarian side Litex Lovech after impressing during a short trial period. He made his debut in a 3–0 away win over Slavia Sofia on 9 August, playing full 90 minutes. During his three years at Lovech Stadium, he scored 5 goals in 72 matches in the league. Barthe collected a host of honours in his Litex career, as a two consecutive A Group titles, the Bulgarian Cup and the Bulgarian Supercup.

=== Ludogorets Razgrad ===
On 30 July 2011, Barthe joined Ludogorets Razgrad, signing a two-year contract. During the 2011–12 A PFG season, he formed a partnership with Ľubomír Guldan in the centre of defence and became an established first team player. In his first full season playing for Ludogorets, Barthe made 29 appearances in the A Group and ended the season winning his third consecutive league medal in Bulgaria and first with Ludogorets.l

On 13 January 2013, Barthe signed a two-year contract extension, keeping him at Ludogorets until 2015.

On 13 March 2014, Barthe suffered a severe injury in a game against Valencia of the Europa League. He was out for two months and made his return to the pitch in Ludogorets's away match at Levski Sofia on 11 May. At the end of the season, Barthe became the first foreign player to win five consecutive A PFG titles, as Ludogorets clinched their third championship in a row. He won a 6th title in succession in mid May 2015.

=== Grasshopper Club Zürich ===
On 12 June 2015, Barthe signed a three-year contract with the Swiss record champion Grasshopper Club Zürich.

=== CSKA Sofia ===
On 1 September 2017, Barthe signed with Bulgarian club CSKA Sofia.

On 8 September 2017, Barthe made his debut for CSKA Sofia in 3 – 0 home win against Vereya (Stara Zagora), making an appearance in the 85-th minute, replacing Nikolay Bodurov. He left the club at the end of the 2017–18 season.

== Career statistics ==
=== Club ===
As of 22 August 2019

Appearances and goals by club, season and competition
Club	Season	League		Cup		Continental		Total	
Club	Season	Apps	Goals	Apps	Goals	Apps	Goals	Apps	Goals
Saint-Étienne B	2003–04	1	0	—		—		1	0
Saint-Étienne B	2004–05	12	0	—		—		12	0
Saint-Étienne B	2005–06	29	2	—		—		29	2
Saint-Étienne B	Total	42	2	—		—		42	2
Rodez AF	2006–07	33	6	4	2	—		37	8
Rodez AF	2007–08	37	1	1	0	—		38	1
Rodez AF	Total	70	7	5	2	—		75	9
Litex Lovech	2008–09	24	0	5	0	4	0	33	0
Litex Lovech	2009–10	27	2	0	0	2	0	29	2
Litex Lovech	2010–11	21	3	2	0	4	0	27	3
Litex Lovech	Total	72	5	7	0	10	0	89	5
Ludogorets Razgrad	2011–12	29	3	3	0	—		32	3
Ludogorets Razgrad	2012–13	14	3	2	0	2	0	18	3
Ludogorets Razgrad	2013–14	17	0	3	1	9	0	29	1
Ludogorets Razgrad	2014–15	13	2	5	1	2	0	20	3
Ludogorets Razgrad	Total	73	8	13	2	13	0	99	10
Grasshopper Club Zürich	2015–16	11	0	0	0	—		11	0
Grasshopper Club Zürich	2016−17	0	0	0	0	0	0	0	0
Grasshopper Club Zürich	Total	11	0	0	0	0	0	11	0
Universitatea Craiova	2016−17	9	0	1	0	—		10	0
Universitatea Craiova	2017−18	6	0	0	0	0	0	6	0
Universitatea Craiova	Total	15	0	1	0	0	0	16	0
CSKA Sofia	2017–18	16	1	4	0	—		20	1
Career total		299	23	30	4	23	0	352	27

== Honours ==
Litex Lovech

- Bulgarian A Group: 2009–10, 2010–11
- Bulgarian Cup: 2008–09
- Bulgarian Supercup: 2010

Ludogorets Razgrad

- Bulgarian A Group: 2011–12, 2012–13, 2013–14, 2014–15
- Bulgarian Cup: 2011–12, 2013–14
- Bulgarian Supercup: 2012, 2014
