= Cosmin Moți =

Romanian footballer

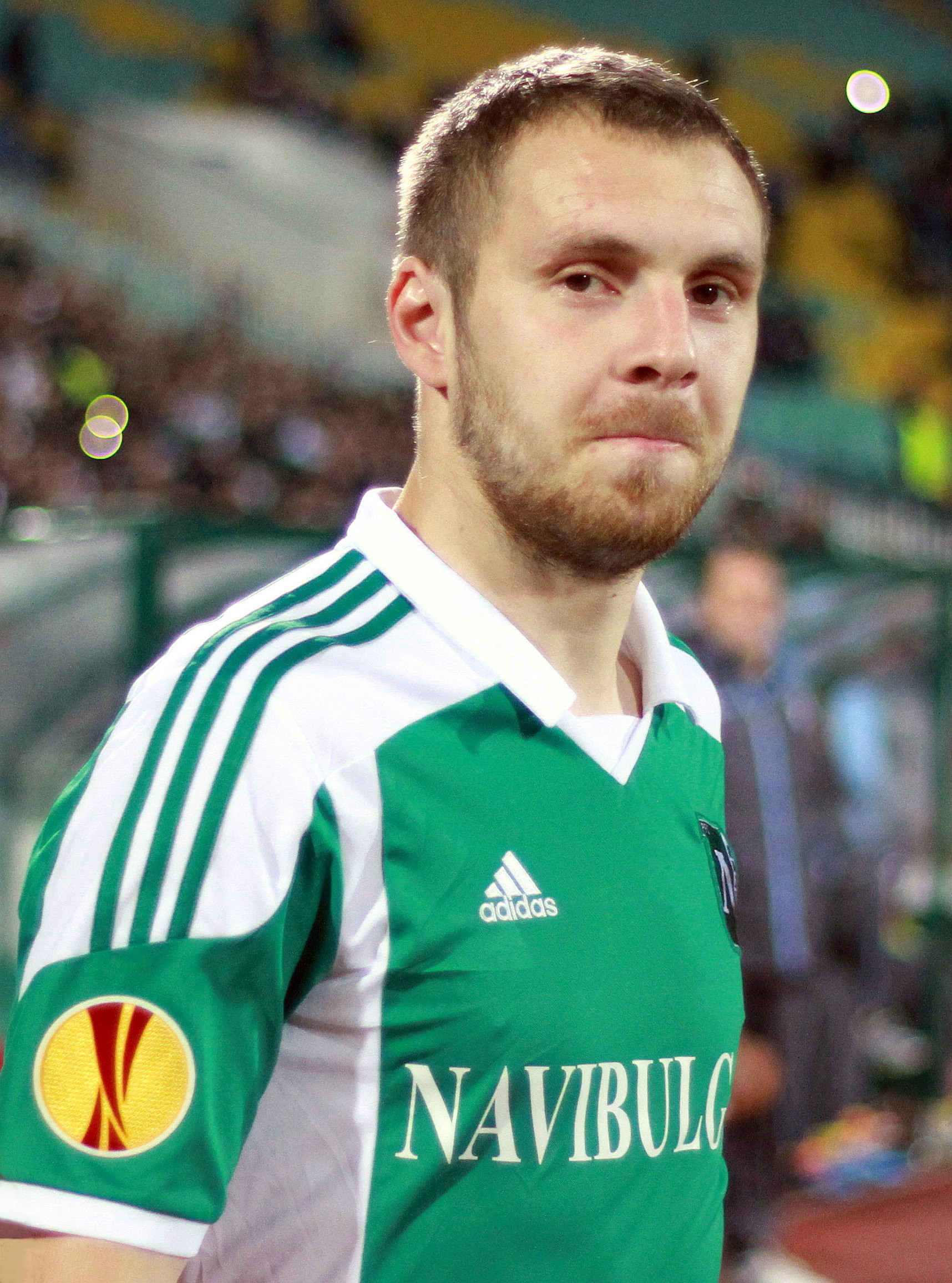
- Moți with Ludogorets Razgrad in 2014

Personal information
- Full name: Cosmin Iosif Moți
- Date of birth: 3 December 1984 (age 41)
- Place of birth: Reșița, Romania
- Height: 1.83 m (6 ft 0 in)
- Position: Centre-back

Team information
- Current team: Ludogorets Razgrad (technical director)

Youth career
- 1992–2002: CSM Reșița
- 2002–2003: Universitatea Craiova

Senior career*
Years	Team	Apps	(Gls)
2003–2005	Universitatea Craiova	39	(0)
2005–2012	Dinamo București	177	(6)
2008	→ Siena (loan)	4	(0)
2012–2021	Ludogorets Razgrad	194	(26)
2021	Ludogorets Razgrad II	2	(0)
Total		416	(32)

International career
2003–2006	Romania U21	21	(1)
2008–2019	Romania	15	(0)

Managerial career
- 2021–: Ludogorets Razgrad (technical director)
- * Club domestic league appearances and goals

Cosmin Iosif Moți (born 3 December 1984) is a Romanian former professional footballer who played as a central defender and currently the technical director of Bulgarian First League club Ludogorets Razgrad.

Moți began his career at Universitatea Craiova before moving to Dinamo București in June 2005. He spent seven seasons with the club and won the 2005 Supercupa României, 2006–07 Liga I title and 2011–12 Cupa României. While at Dinamo, he also spent time on loan at Serie A club Siena.

In June 2012, Moți signed with Ludogorets, with whom he won seven consecutive Bulgarian league titles, as well as two Bulgarian Cups, and four Bulgarian Supercups. In May 2015, Ludogorets Arena's South Stand was officially renamed the Moți Stand in recognition of his unique contribution for Ludogorets's first ever participation in the group stage of Champions league.

In 2008, Moți won his first cap for Romania. He has represented the country at UEFA Euro 2008 and 2016.

== Club career ==
=== Early years ===
Moți was born on 3 December 1984 in Reșița, Romania and began playing junior-level football in 1992 at local club CSM Reșița. On 24 May 2003, he made his Liga I debut, playing for Universitatea Craiova under coach Sorin Cârțu in a 3–0 loss to Ceahlăul Piatra Neamț. He spent three seasons at "U" Craiova, but in the last one the team was relegated to the second league, so Moți, along with several other teammates, went to play for Dinamo București.

=== Dinamo București ===
He made his competitive debut for Dinamo under coach Ioan Andone, playing the full 90 minutes in the 2005 Supercupa României that ended with a 3–2 victory against rival side Steaua București. Andone also used him in seven games in the 2005–06 UEFA Cup campaign when the team eliminated Everton with a historical 5–2 on aggregate, reaching the group stage.

In the 2006–07 Liga I season, coach Mircea Rednic had Moți form a partnership in the central defense with Ștefan Radu, which helped Dinamo win the Liga I trophy. Dinamo also advanced past the group stage of the 2006–07 UEFA Cup, reaching the round of 32 where the team was eliminated with 3–1 on aggregate by Benfica. In June 2008, he was linked with a move to Lazio to play alongside his former Dinamo teammate, Ștefan Radu, who was already at the club. Lazio's president, Claudio Lotito, came to Romania to discuss the transfer with Dinamo's officials but the move fell through.

Moți helped the club achieve what was dubbed "The wonder from Liberec" by winning the away game 3–0 against Slovan Liberec to force a penalty shoot-out after losing the first leg by the same score, ultimately qualifying for the 2009–10 Europa League group stage. In his last season spent at Dinamo, he won the 2011–12 Cupa României, being used by coach Dario Bonetti the entire match in the 1–0 victory in the final against Rapid București. During his period spent with The Red Dogs the fans appreciated his secure style of play, one of their favorite chant during the games being: Cu Moți n-ai emoții (English: With Moți you have no emotions).

==== Siena (loan) ====
On 1 September 2008, Moți was sent on loan by Dinamo to Siena for €600,000, where he was teammates with compatriot Paul Codrea. He made his Serie A debut on 25 October, when coach Marco Giampaolo sent him in the 81st minute to replace Daniele Ficagna in a 1–1 draw against Catania. Moți made his first start for Siena in a 1–1 home draw against Bologna on 16 November. On 2 February 2009, after only four Serie A appearances, his loan was cancelled by Siena and he subsequently returned to Dinamo.

=== Ludogorets Razgrad ===
On 28 June 2012, Moți signed with Bulgarian club Ludogorets Razgrad. He made his debut on 18 July, in a 1–1 home draw against Dinamo Zagreb in the second qualifying round of the Champions League, coming on as a substitute for Svetoslav Dyakov. A month later, on 19 August, he made his A Group debut in a 3–1 home win over Beroe Stara Zagora. With his wholehearted attitude and commitment to the team, he quickly established himself as a first-team regular. Moți scored his first goal for Ludogorets on 4 November in a 4–0 home win against Etar 1924.

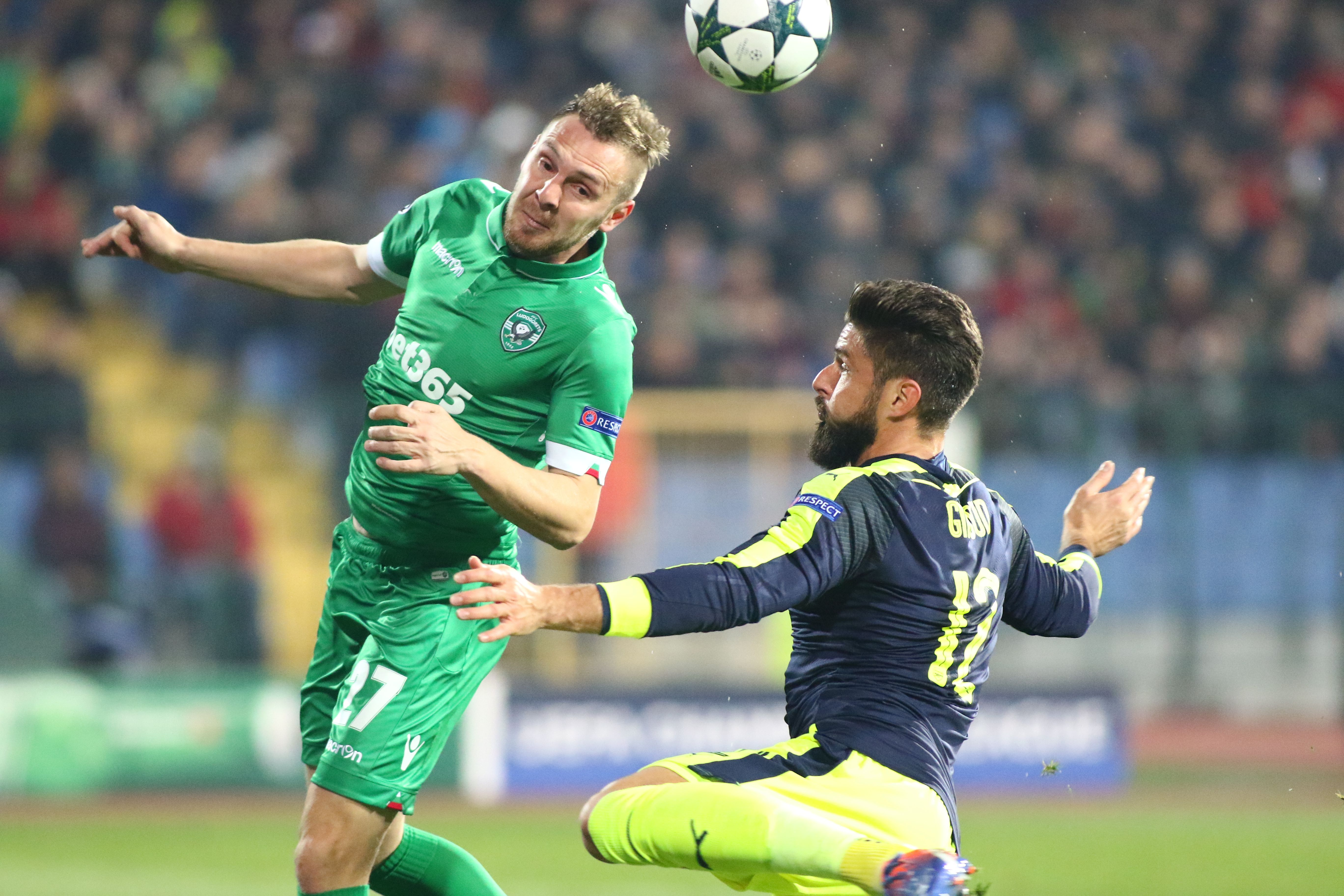
Moți (left) with Ludogorets against Arsenal in 2016

On 27 August 2014, Moți played as the goalkeeper for the final minutes in the Champions League play-off round against Steaua București after regular goalkeeper Vladislav Stoyanov was sent off for a tactical foul in the closing stages of extra time. Moți scored the first kick of the penalty shoot-out and went on to save two shots as Ludogorets advanced to the group stage for the first time in their history. Moți's heroics earned him cult status among Razgrad fans and he had one of the stadium's stands named after him. His performance in the memorable encounter also generated headlines in the main international sports media across Europe and the world, with some analyzers considering the match one of the most dramatic in the history of the Champions League. On 4 October 2018, Moți together with teammate Svetoslav Dyakov was in the starting line-up for Ludogorets in the 1–0 away loss against FC Zürich in the group stage of the UEFA Europa League and they jointly became the players with the most appearances for (a) Bulgarian team(s) in European club tournaments, alongside Hristo Yovov whose record of 66 matches they equaled. Moți has (as of 14 April 2020) made 76 appearances, trailing club mates Marcelinho who has 80 and Dyakov (with 79). Although he was no longer an undisputed starter during the 2019–20 season, in May 2020, Moți extended his contract with the team.

Moti announced his retirement on 15 May 2021, after Ludogorets won its 10th consecutive title. During his years spent at Ludogorets, he was teammates with fellow Romanians Claudiu Keșerü, Dragoș Grigore, Andrei Prepeliță and Adrian Popa.

== International career ==
Moți played 15 games for Romania, making his debut on 6 February 2008, when coach Victor Pițurcă sent him in the 90+1st minute to replace Gabriel Tamaș in a 1–0 friendly loss to Israel. He was selected by Pițurcă to be part of the national team's squad for the Euro 2008 final tournament, but did not play in a single match there. Subsequently, he played one game each in the 2010 World Cup qualifiers and the Euro 2012 qualifiers. Moți was chosen by coach Anghel Iordănescu to be part of Romania's squad for the Euro 2016 final tournament, but once again he did not play in any matches. Afterwards, he made three appearances during the 2018 World Cup qualifiers, and two in the 2018–19 Nations League. His last appearance for the national team was on 26 March 2019 in a 4–1 victory against the Faroe Islands in the Euro 2020 qualifiers.

== After retirement career ==
On 7 June 2021, Moti was announced as the new technical director of Ludogorets Razgrad.

== Career statistics ==
=== Club ===
Appearances and goals by club, season and competition
Club	Season	League			Cup (Note: Includes Cupa României, Coppa Italia, Bulgarian Cup)		Europe		Other		Total	
Club	Season	Division	Apps	Goals	Apps	Goals	Apps	Goals	Apps	Goals	Apps	Goals
Universitatea Craiova	2002–03	Divizia A	2	0	–		–		–		2	0
Universitatea Craiova	2003–04	Divizia A	17	0	1	0	–		–		18	0
Universitatea Craiova	2004–05	Divizia A	20	0	4	0	–		–		24	0
Universitatea Craiova	Total		39	0	5	0	–		–		44	0
Dinamo București	2005–06	Divizia A	27	1	3	0	7 (Note: Appearances in UEFA Cup)	0	1 (Note: Appearances in Supercupa României)	0	38	1
Dinamo București	2006–07	Liga I	29	1	1	0	10	0	–		40	1
Dinamo București	2007–08	Liga I	23	1	2	0	1	0	1	0	27	1
Dinamo București	2008–09	Liga I	21	0	2	0	–		–		23	0
Dinamo București	2009–10	Liga I	24	1	3	0	4 (Note: Appearances in UEFA Europa League)	0	–		31	1
Dinamo București	2010–11	Liga I	28	0	4	1	3	0	–		35	1
Dinamo București	2011–12	Liga I	25	2	4	0	4	1	–		33	3
Dinamo București	Total		177	6	19	1	29	1	2	0	227	8
Siena (loan)	2008–09	Serie A	4	0	1	0	–		–		5	0
Ludogorets Razgrad	2012–13	A Group	21	1	1	0	2 (Note: Appearances in UEFA Champions League)	0	0	0	24	1
Ludogorets Razgrad	2013–14	A Group	29	3	8	3	13 (Note: Five appearances in UEFA Champions League, eight appearances in UEFA Europa League)	0	1 (Note: Appearance in Bulgarian Super Cup)	0	51	6
Ludogorets Razgrad	2014–15	A Group	23	3	3	0	12	0	1	0	39	3
Ludogorets Razgrad	2015–16	A Group	30	5	0	0	2	0	1	0	33	5
Ludogorets Razgrad	2016–17	First League	22	4	2	0	14 (Note: Twelve appearances and two goals in UEFA Champions League, two appearances in UEFA Europa League)	2	–		38	6
Ludogorets Razgrad	2017–18	First League	20	2	1	1	13 (Note: Four appearances in UEFA Champions League, nine appearances and two goals in UEFA Europa League)	2	1	0	35	5
Ludogorets Razgrad	2018–19	First League	28	5	1	0	13 (Note: Four appearances in UEFA Champions League, nine appearances and one goal in UEFA Europa League)	1	1	0	43	6
Ludogorets Razgrad	2019–20	First League	12	2	3	1	7 (Note: Two appearances in UEFA Champions League, five appearances and one goal in UEFA Europa League)	1	1	0	23	4
Ludogorets Razgrad	2020–21	First League	9	1	1	0	5 (Note: Two appearances in UEFA Champions League, three appearances in UEFA Europa League)	0	1	0	16	1
Ludogorets Razgrad	Total		194	26	20	5	81	6	7	0	302	37
Ludogorets Razgrad II	2020–21	Bulgarian Second League	2	0	–		–		–		2	0
Career total			416	32	45	6	110	7	9	0	580	45

=== International ===
Appearances and goals by national team and year
National team	Year	Apps	Goals
Romania	2008	4	0
Romania	2009	0	0
Romania	2010	0	0
Romania	2011	1	0
Romania	2012	0	0
Romania	2013	0	0
Romania	2014	1	0
Romania	2015	0	0
Romania	2016	4	0
Romania	2017	2	0
Romania	2018	2	0
Romania	2019	1	0
Total		15	0

== Honours ==
Dinamo București

- Liga I: 2006–07
- Cupa României: 2011–12
- Supercupa României: 2005

Ludogorets Razgrad

- Bulgarian First League: 2012–13, 2013–14, 2014–15, 2015–16, 2016–17, 2017–18, 2018–19, 2019–20, 2020–21
- Bulgarian Cup: 2013–14
- Bulgarian Supercup: 2012, 2014, 2018, 2019

Individual

- Ludogorets Fans' Player of the Year: 2014
- Bulgarian A Group Defender of the Year: 2014
- Bulgarian A Group Foreign Player of the Year: 2014
