= Juninho Quixadá =

Brazilian footballer

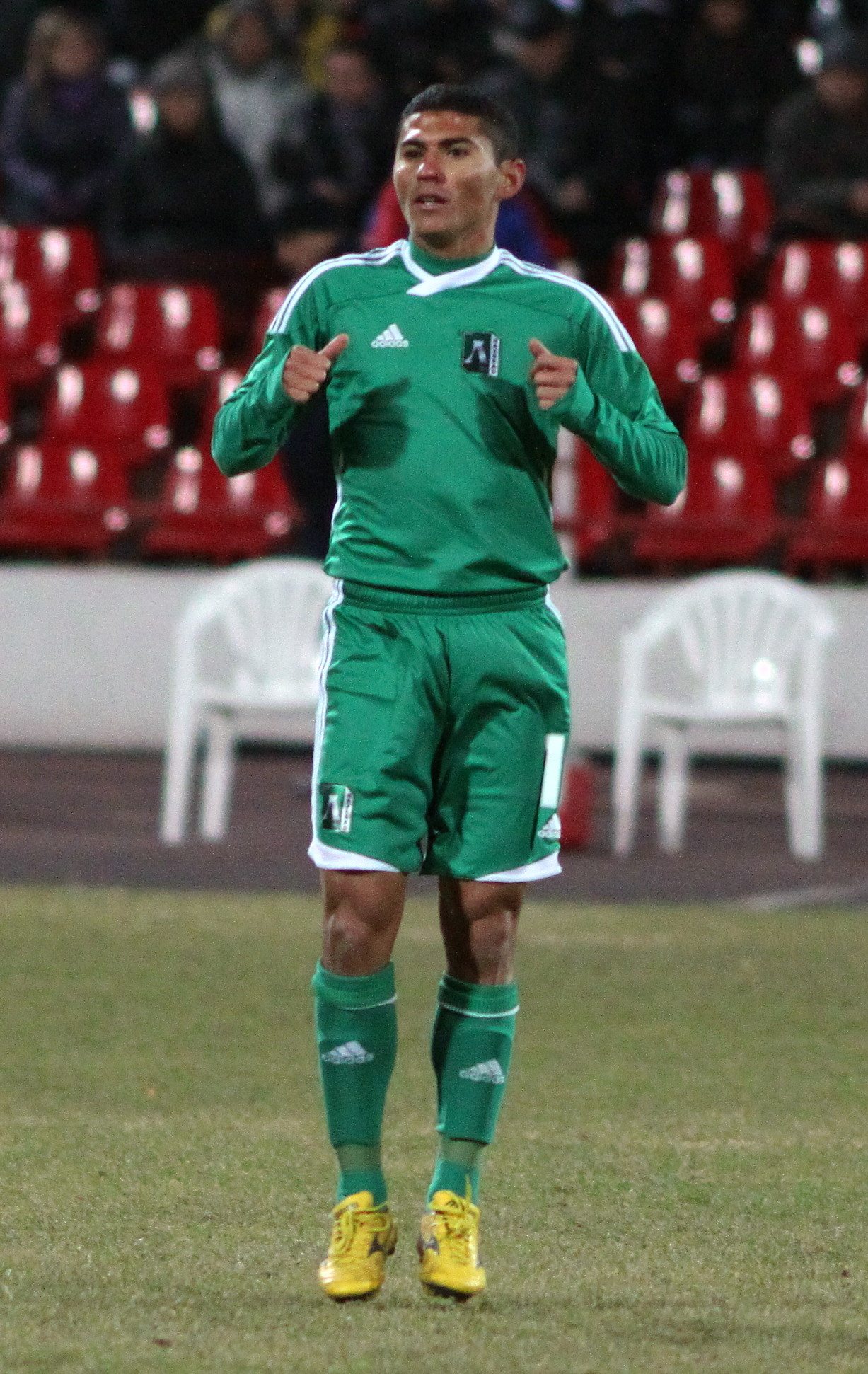

Personal information
- Full name: Pedro Julião Azevedo Junior
- Date of birth: 12 December 1985 (age 40)
- Place of birth: Quixadá, Brazil
- Height: 1.70 m (5 ft 7 in)
- Position: Forward

Team information
- Current team: Maracanã

Senior career*
Years	Team	Apps	(Gls)
2005–2007	Quixadá		
2007	Horizonte		
2008	Tiradentes-CE		
2009	Ferroviário		
2010–2011	Bragantino	16	(6)
2011–2018	Ludogorets Razgrad	132	(34)
2018	Ferroviário	9	(3)
2018–2020	Ceará	20	(2)
2020	Vitória	6	(0)
2021	ABC	6	(0)
2022–	Maracanã	2	(0)
- * Club domestic league appearances and goals as of 14:11, 4 February 2022 (UTC)

Pedro Julião Azevedo Junior (born 12 December 1985), known as Juninho Quixadá (Brazilian Portuguese pronunciation: [ʒuˈniɲu kiʃaˈda]), is a Brazilian footballer who plays as a forward for Maracanã.

== Career ==
Born in Quixadá, Juninho Quixadá has previously played for Ferroviário, as well as for Bragantino, before moving in 2011 to Bulgaria.

On 20 June 2011, Juninho joined PFC Ludogorets Razgrad on a three-year contract for an undisclosed fee. He made his debut on 3 July in a 6–1 friendly win against Septemvri Simitli, playing 45 minutes on the right wing.

Juninho made his league debut for Ludogorets against Lokomotiv Plovdiv on 6 August 2011. He scored his first competitive goal on 20 August in a 4–0 victory against Vidima-Rakovski. On 11 September, he scored twice in a 6–0 win over Slavia Sofia. On 28 November 2011, in a 2–2 away draw against CSKA Sofia, Juninho netted his fourth goal of the season and assisted Ivan Stoyanov. On 27 February 2014, he scored a last-minute goal against Lazio to bring the score to 3–3 and enable his team to advance to the Round of 16 of the UEFA Europa League, 4–3 on aggregate.

After almost 7 years in Ludogorets, Juninho left the club on 11 January 2018 due to mutual agreement.

== Club statistics ==
As of 11 January 2018

Club	Season	Brasileirão		Paulista A1		Copa do Brasil		Total	
Club	Season	Apps	Goals	Apps	Goals	Apps	Goals	Apps	Goals
Bragantino	2010	10	5	15	2	?	?	25	7
Bragantino	2011	6	1	10	6	?	?	16	7
Bragantino	Total	16	6	25	8	0	0	41	14
		A Group		Bulgarian Cup		Europe		Total	
Ludogorets Razgrad	2011–12	11	5	1	0	–	–	12	5
Ludogorets Razgrad	2012–13	17	3	0	0	–	–	17	3
Ludogorets Razgrad	2013–14	30	7	7	0	8	3	45	10
Ludogorets Razgrad	2014–15	25	10	6	3	2	0	33	13
Ludogorets Razgrad	2015–16	16	3	0	0	2	0	18	3
Ludogorets Razgrad	2016–17	24	3	6	1	4	0	34	4
Ludogorets Razgrad	2017–18	9	3	2	1	0	0	11	4
Ludogorets Razgrad	Total	132	34	22	5	16	3	170	42

== International career ==
On 24 January 2013, Juninho received a Bulgarian passport and potentially became able to play for Bulgaria. He said that he would be happy to represent Bulgaria on the international level.

== Honours ==
=== Club ===
Ludogorets

- Bulgarian First Professional League: 2011–12, 2012–13, 2013–14, 2014–15, 2015-16, 2016–17
- Bulgarian Cup: 2011–12, 2013–14
- Bulgarian Supercup: 2012, 2014
