= Hristo Spasov =

Bulgarian footballer (1988–2026)

Personal information
- Full name: Hristo Vasilev Spasov
- Date of birth: 13 June 1988
- Place of birth: Dorkovo, Bulgaria
- Date of death: 6 September 2026 (aged 38)
- Place of death: Byaga, Bulgaria
- Height: 1.77 m (5 ft 10 in)
- Position: Forward

Youth career
- Naftex

Senior career*
Years	Team	Apps	(Gls)
2007–2009	Naftex	28	(6)
2009–2010	Chepinets	31	(28)
2010–2011	Lokomotiv Septemvri	34	(32)
2011	Hebar	13	(15)
2012	Lokomotiv Plovdiv	9	(2)
2013–2014	Chepinets	49	(27)
2015	Conegliano German	14	(8)
2015	Septemvri Sofia	13	(13)
2016–2017	Botev Vratsa	16	(13)
2017–2018	Spartak Pleven	26	(15)
2018–2019	Bansko	29	(23)
2020	Belasitsa Petrich		
- * Club domestic league appearances and goals

Hristo Vasilev Spasov (Bulgarian: Христо Василев Спасов; 13 June 1988 – 6 September 2026) was a Bulgarian professional footballer who played as a forward.

== Career ==
During the 2009–10 season, Spasov finished as the South-West V AFG's top scorer with 28 goals for Chepinets Velingrad. In the following season, he became the league's top goalscorer for the second time, scoring 32 goals for Lokomotiv Septemvri.

On 30 January 2012, Spasov joined Lokomotiv Plovdiv. He made his A PFG debut in a 2–1 away win over Kaliakra Kavarna on 18 March.

On 19 July 2017, Spasov joined Spartak Pleven, but was released at the end of the season.

== Death ==
Spasov died on 6 September 2026, at the age of 38, having suffered a fatal heart attack right after playing football in an amateur competition.
