= Veselin Minev =

Bulgarian footballer (born 1980)

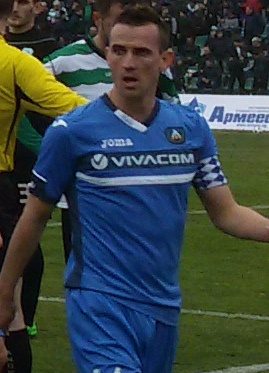
- Minev with Levski Sofia in 2016

Personal information
- Full name: Veselin Milchev Minev
- Date of birth: 14 October 1980 (age 46)
- Place of birth: Pazardzhik, Bulgaria
- Height: 1.74 m (5 ft 9 in)
- Position: Left-back

Youth career
- Hebar Pazardzhik

Senior career*
Years	Team	Apps	(Gls)
2000–2001	Hebar Pazardzhik	2	(0)
2001–2003	Belasitsa Petrich	34	(0)
2004–2006	Botev Plovdiv	62	(4)
2006–2011	Levski Sofia	91	(1)
2011–2012	Antalyaspor	29	(0)
2013–2014	Botev Plovdiv	35	(0)
2014–2017	Levski Sofia	80	(0)
2017	Etar	14	(0)
2018	Vereya	10	(0)
2018–2019	Tsarsko Selo	38	(0)
2020	Vitosha Bistritsa	4	(0)
2021–2022	Vihren Sandanski		

International career
2009–2016	Bulgaria	25	(0)

Managerial career
- 2021: Hebar Pazardzhik (youth coach)
- 2021: Levski Sofia (assistant)
- 2022–2024: Arda Kardzhali (assistant)
- * Club domestic league appearances and goals

Veselin Minev (Bulgarian Cyrillic: Веселин Минев; born 14 October 1980) is a Bulgarian former professional footballer who played as a left-back.

He has a twin brother, Yordan, who is also a footballer.

== Club career ==
Minev, together with his twin brother, started his career at Hebar Pazardzhik. Later, Minev joined Botev Plovdiv.

=== Levski Sofia ===
Minev came to Levski in June 2006.

On 9 May 2009, Minev and his twin brother Yordan entered in the history of The Eternal Derby. The situation was even more interesting, because Veselin was a left full-back and his brother Yordan was a right midfielder, and Veselin guarded his brother Yordan. Despite the tackles, after a foul against Veselin, Yordan came to him and call the referee.

He became a Champion of Bulgaria in 2008–09 season. In 2009–10 season, Levski achieved qualifying for UEFA Europa League becoming third in the final ranking. During the 2010–11 Levski qualified for UEFA Europa League after eliminating Dundalk F.C., Kalmar FF and AIK Fotboll. Levski was drawn in Group C, facing Gent, Lille and Sporting CP.

=== Antalyaspor ===
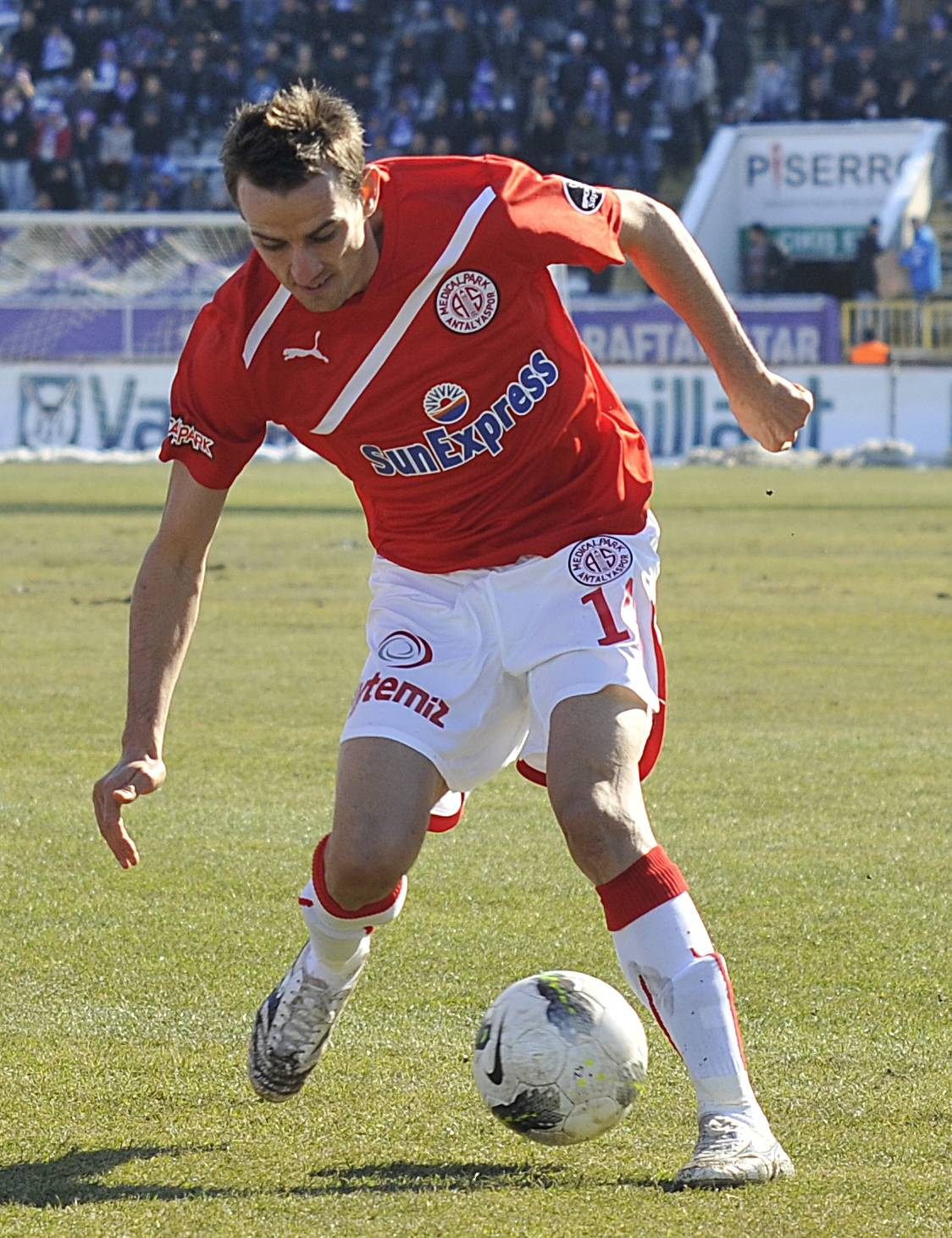
Minev playing for Antalyaspor in 2011

On 30 May 2011, Minev signed a three-year deal with Turkish club Antalyaspor for an undisclosed fee. He left the club in early December 2012 for personal reasons.

=== Botev Plovdiv ===
On 12 December 2012, immediately following the appointment of Stanimir Stoilov as head coach, Minev signed a 1.5-year contract (with the option for an additional year) with his former club Botev Plovdiv. Minev was among the first choice defenders during his time with the "canaries", captaining the team on occasions. His last game for the club was a 4–0 home victory against Libertas in the first qualifying round for UEFA Europa League on 3 July 2014.

=== Levski Sofia ===
In July 2014 Minev's contract with Botev was terminated due to the financial problems that occurred in the club. On 7 July 2014, he returned to Levski signing a new 1+1 year deal with the club. He was released in June 2017.

=== Etar ===
On 16 June 2017, Minev signed a one-year contract with newly promoted Etar Veliko Tarnovo.

=== Vereya ===
On 13 January 2018 Minev joined Vereya Stara Zagora on a six-month contract.

=== Tsarsko Selo ===
On 11 June 2018, Minev signed a one-year contract with Second League club Tsarsko Selo.

== International career ==
On 28 August 2009, Minev received his first international call-up for the World Qualifier match against Montenegro. He remained an unused substitute for the game. On 10 October 2009, he made his debut for the national side in the 1:4 away loss to Cyprus, playing the full 90 minutes of the game. Minev was a starter for Bulgaria during the first two 2014 World Cup qualifiers, but in October 2012 he received a two-match ban for his involvement in a number of incidents during the ill-tempered match against Armenia.

=== Later and coaching career ===
In January 2021, Minev returned to Hebar Pazardzhik as a youth coach. He left the position in April 2021 to join his former teammate, Zhivko Milanov, as assistant manager at Levski Sofia. After Milanov was released in September 2021, Minev also left his position. A week later, Minev came out of retirement to play for Vihren Sandanski. He played for the club for the rest of the season.

At the end of May 2022, Minew was appointed assistant manager of FC Arda Kardzhali.

== Career statistics ==
=== Club ===
As of 13 January 2018

Appearances and goals by club, season and competition
Club	Season	League		Cups		Europe		Total	
Club	Season	Apps	Goals	Apps	Goals	Apps	Goals	Apps	Goals
Levski Sofia	2006–07	10	0	3	0	1	0	14	0
Levski Sofia	2007–08	18	0	3	0	0	0	21	0
Levski Sofia	2008–09	18	0	2	0	1	0	21	0
Levski Sofia	2009–10	22	0	2	0	12	0	36	0
Levski Sofia	2010–11	23	1	3	0	11	0	35	1
Antalyaspor	2011–12	25	0	7	0	–	–	32	0
Antalyaspor	2012–13	4	0	2	0	–	–	6	0
Botev Plovdiv	2012–13	8	0	0	0	–	–	8	0
Botev Plovdiv	2013–14	27	0	6	0	6	0	39	0
Botev Plovdiv	2014–15	0	0	0	0	1	0	1	0
Levski Sofia	2014–15	24	0	6	0	–	–	30	0
Levski Sofia	2015–16	32	0	2	0	–	–	34	0
Levski Sofia	2016–17	24	0	1	0	2	0	27	0
Etar Veliko Tarnovo	2017–18	14	0	0	0	–	–	14	0
Vereya	2017–18	0	0	0	0	–	–	0	0
Career total		249	1	37	0	34	0	320	1

=== International ===
Appearances and goals by national team and year
National team	Year	Apps	Goals
Bulgaria	2009	3	0
Bulgaria	2010	4	0
Bulgaria	2011	1	0
Bulgaria	2012	6	0
Bulgaria	2013	5	0
Bulgaria	2014	5	0
Bulgaria	2015	1	0
Total		25	0

== Honours ==
Levski Sofia

- Champion of Bulgaria: 2006–07, 2008–09
- Bulgarian Cup 2007
- Bulgarian Supercup 2006–07, 2008–09
