= Ivan Stoyanov (footballer, born 1983) =

Bulgarian footballer

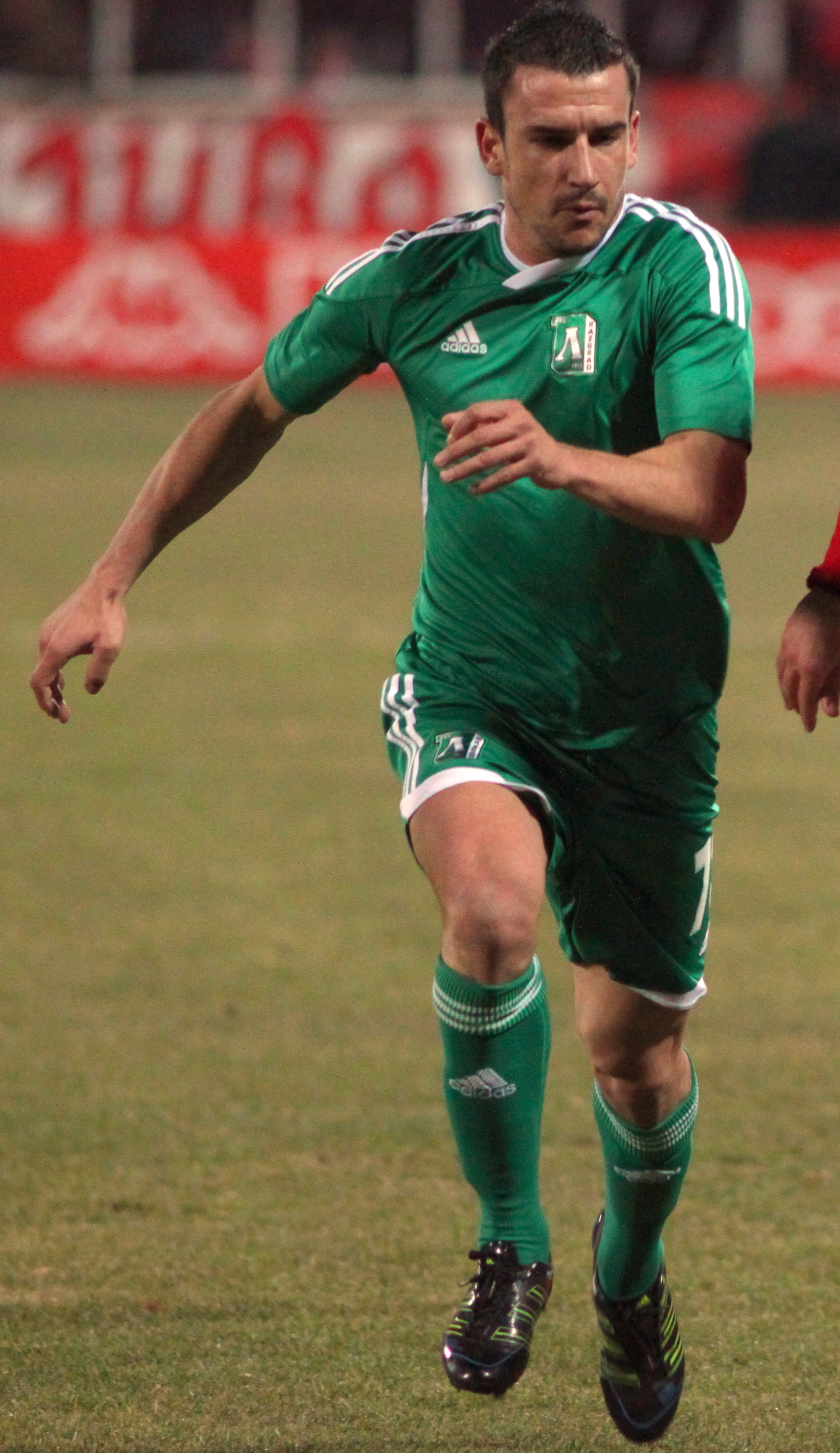
- Stoyanov playing for Ludogorets in 2011

Personal information
- Full name: Ivan Ivanov Stoyanov
- Date of birth: 24 July 1983 (age 43)
- Place of birth: Sliven, Bulgaria
- Height: 1.77 m (5 ft 10 in)
- Positions: Winger; attacking midfielder

Team information
- Current team: Ludogorets Razgrad II (manager)

Senior career*
Years	Team	Apps	(Gls)
2002–2005	Sliven	37	(15)
2005–2006	VfB Stuttgart II	13	(4)
2006–2009	Sliven	67	(34)
2009	CSKA Sofia	14	(8)
2010–2011	Alania Vladikavkaz	32	(2)
2011–2013	Ludogorets Razgrad	65	(25)
2014–2015	CSKA Sofia	21	(3)
2015	Vereya	4	(0)
2016	Montana	13	(1)
2016	Botev Plovdiv	17	(2)
2017–2020	Etar	86	(9)
2020–2022	Zagorets	1	(0)
Total		370	(103)

International career^{‡}
2004–2005	Bulgaria U21	12	(1)
2004–2012	Bulgaria	12	(0)

Managerial career
- 2021–2022: Zagorets (player-coach)
- 2022–2024: Sliven
- 2024–2025: CSKA 1948 III
- 2025: CSKA 1948 II
- 2025–2026: CSKA 1948
- 2026–: Ludogorets Razgrad II
- * Club domestic league appearances and goals ‡ National team caps and goals as of 14:53, 17 November 2024 (UTC)

Ivan Stoyanov (Bulgarian: Иван Стоянов; born 24 July 1983) is a Bulgarian football coach and a former player who played as a winger or attacking midfielder and is now the manager of Ludogorets Razgrad II.

== Career ==
=== Sliven & Stuttgart ===
Stoyanov started his career in his home town Sliven in local team OFC Sliven 2000. In 2005, he signed a contract with German side VfB Stuttgart, but only played one league game for the club before returning to Sliven in May 2006. In 2007–08 season with his goals Stoyanov helped the team gain promotion to the first division in Bulgaria. He scored 16 goals in 15 matches. In September 2007, Stoyanov was banned for one year from football after an incident with a linesman in a match against Kaliakra Kavarna following his dismissal from the field by the main official. He subsequently reestablished himself as a key player for Sliven.

=== CSKA Sofia ===
After an impressive 2008–09 season with the newly promoted Sliven, on 24 June 2009 Stoyanov signed a 3-year contract with CSKA Sofia. On 30 July 2009, Stoyanov marked his official debut for the armymen by scoring the goal for the 1:0 home win against Northern Irish side Derry City F.C. in the third qualifying round of the UEFA Europa League. On 9 August 2009, he scored a brace in the 5:0 away win against Lokomotiv Plovdiv in a league game. On 30 August 2009, he scored another double, this time against Lokomotiv Mezdra, in a league game. On 20 September 2009, Stoyanov scored the opening goal in the 2:0 home win against Levski Sofia in The Eternal Derby.

=== Alania ===
On 25 February 2010 Russian side Alania Vladikavkaz signed the Bulgarian international from CSKA Sofia, the midfielder agreed to a three-year deal for $1.2 million. Stoyanov scored his first goal for Alania in their 1–0 home win against Rostov in the Russian Premier League on 25 April 2010.

=== Ludogorets Razgrad ===
On 29 August 2011, Stoyanov signed a contract with newly promoted A PFG club Ludogorets Razgrad. His debut for the team came on 11 September 2011, in the 6:0 home win against Slavia Sofia. On 30 September 2011, he scored a last-minute goal against Botev Vratsa to temporarily propel the team to the top of the A PFG table. On 28 November 2011, Stoyanov scored another last-minute goal, this time against former club CSKA Sofia, to help Ludogorets secure a 2:2 away draw and enable the team from Razgrad to finish the first half of the A PFG season in first place in the standings. On 2 April 2012, he netted the only goal for his team in the 1:0 away win over Levski Sofia, helping Ludogorets put an end to a three-game losing streak. Stoyanov eventually finished the 2011–12 A PFG season as joint top scorer with Junior Moraes, while Ludogorets won its first A PFG title. On 24 July 2013, he opened the scoring in the 3:0 home win over Slovak side Slovan Bratislava in a 2nd qualifying round UEFA Champions League match. On 21 August 2013, Stoyanov scored a goal early in the second half to give Ludogorets a 2:1 lead over Swiss club FC Basel in a first leg match of the playoff round, but the team from Razgrad eventually lost by a score of 2:4. Stoyanov saw less first team action during the 2013/2014 A PFG season due to the strong performance of the other forwards and rejoined CSKA Sofia in February 2014.

=== Botev Plovdiv ===
On 15 June Ivan Stoyanov joined Botev Plovdiv. During the preseason friendly games Stoyanov scored twice against FC Eurocollege and once against FC Oborishte. Stoyanov scored twice in the final preseason friendly against FC Vereya.

On 30 July 2016 Ivan Stoyanov made an official debut for Botev Plovdiv and scored for the 1–1 draw with the local rivals Lokomotiv Plovdiv. He also picked up the man of the match award. Ivan Stoyanov made assists in the games against Slavia Sofia on 15 August and against PFC Neftochimic Burgas on 27 August. He was released in January 2017.

=== Etar ===
On 16 January 2017, Stoyanov joined Etar Veliko Tarnovo.

== Career statistics ==
As of 13 December 2013

Club	Season	League		Cup		Europe		Total	
Club	Season	Apps	Goals	Apps	Goals	Apps	Goals	Apps	Goals
Sliven 2000	2002–03	5	1	—		—		5	1
Sliven 2000	2003–04	13	4	—		—		13	4
Sliven 2000	2004–05	19	10	—		—		19	10
Sliven 2000	Total	37	15	0	0	0	0	37	15
VfB Stuttgart II	2005–06	13	4	—		—		13	4
VfB Stuttgart II	Total	13	4	0	0	0	0	13	4
Sliven 2000	2006–07	24	9	1	1	—		25	10
Sliven 2000	2007–08	15	16	0	0	—		15	16
Sliven 2000	2008–09	29	9	2	1	—		31	10
Sliven 2000	Total	67	34	3	2	0	0	71	36
CSKA Sofia	2009–10	14	8	1	0	7	1	22	9
CSKA Sofia	Total	14	8	1	0	7	1	22	9
Alania Vladikavkaz	2010	24	2	0	0	—		24	2
Alania Vladikavkaz	2011	8	0	1	0	2	0	11	0
Alania Vladikavkaz	Total	32	2	1	0	2	0	35	2
Ludogorets Razgrad	2011–12	25	16	4	3	—		29	19
Ludogorets Razgrad	2012–13	28	9	1	0	2	0	31	9
Ludogorets Razgrad	2013–14	12	0	2	0	11	2	25	2
Ludogorets Razgrad	Total	65	25	7	3	13	2	85	30
Career total		228	88	12	5	22	3	263	96

== Honours ==
- Ludogorets
  - A Group (2): 2011–12, 2012–13
  - Bulgarian Cup (1): 2012
  - Bulgarian Supercup (1): 2012

== International career ==
Between 2004 and 2005 Stoyanov played in Bulgaria national under-21 football team. In 2004, he made his debut for the senior side.

== Personal life ==
Stoyanov is the nephew of footballer Yordan Lechkov, who also serves as his agent.
