= Mihail Aleksandrov =

Bulgarian footballer (born 1989)

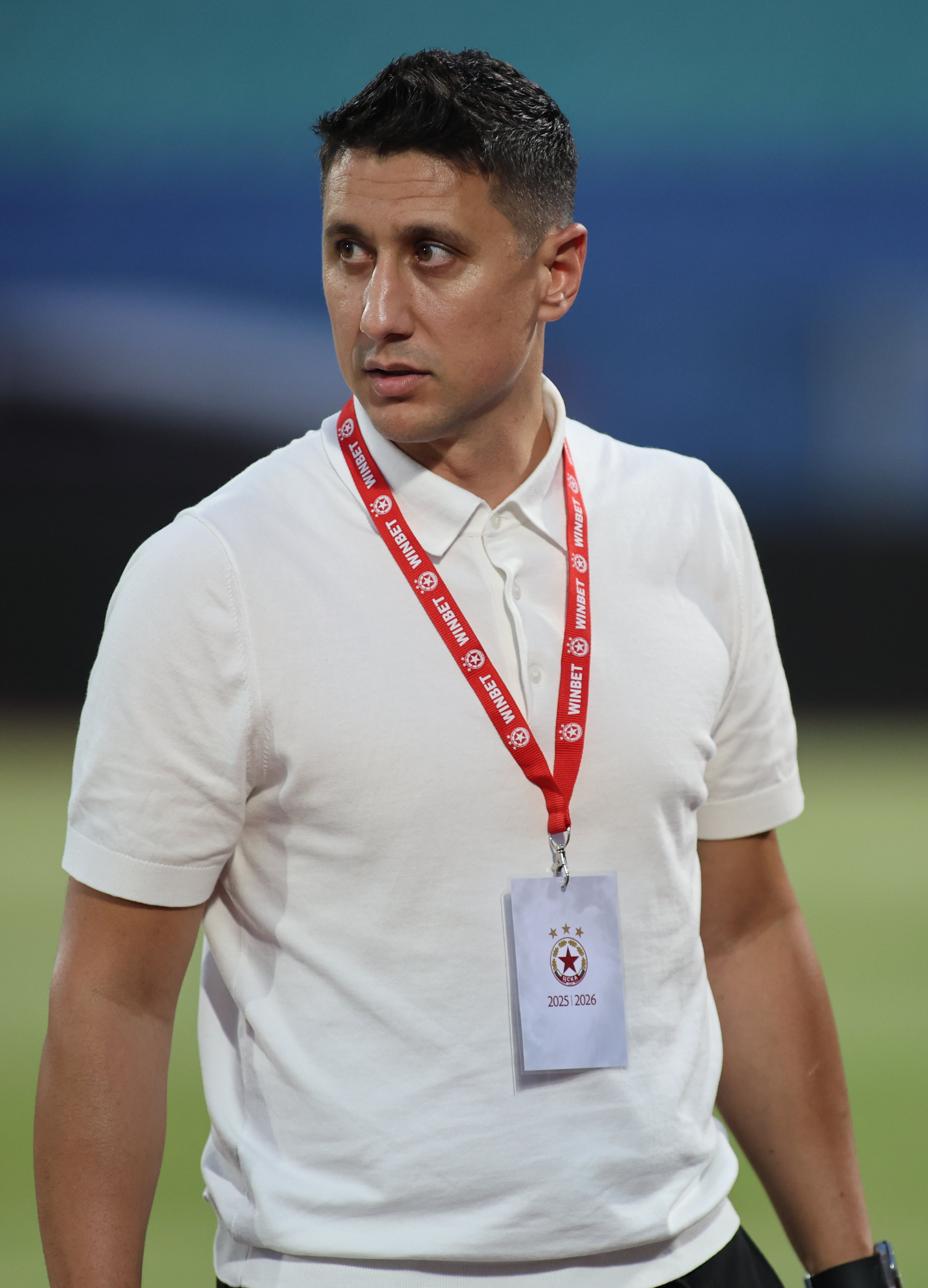
- Aleksandrov in CSKA Sofia, 2025

Personal information
- Full name: Mihail Ivanov Aleksandrov
- Date of birth: 11 June 1989 (age 37)
- Place of birth: Sofia, Bulgaria
- Height: 1.79 m (5 ft 10 in)
- Position: Winger

Team information
- Current team: CSKA Sofia (technical director)

Youth career
- 1996–2007: CSKA Sofia
- 2007–2009: Borussia Dortmund

Senior career*
Years	Team	Apps	(Gls)
2006–2007	CSKA Sofia	3	(0)
2010	Akademik Sofia	11	(0)
2010–2016	Ludogorets Razgrad	106	(17)
2015–2016	Ludogorets Razgrad II	6	(4)
2016–2017	Legia Warsaw	18	(1)
2016	Legia Warsaw II	1	(0)
2017–2019	Arsenal Tula	32	(1)
2019–2021	Arda Kardzhali	10	(0)
2021	Slavia Sofia	14	(0)
Total		201	(23)

International career
2006	Bulgaria U17	5	(0)
2008	Bulgaria U19	9	(2)
2014–2017	Bulgaria	21	(3)
- * Club domestic league appearances and goals

Mihail Ivanov Aleksandrov (Bulgarian: Михаил Иванов Александров; born 11 June 1989) is a Bulgarian former footballer who played as a midfielder. He primarily played as a right winger or a right-sided midfielder.

== Club career ==
=== CSKA Sofia ===
Aleksandrov began his career at CSKA Sofia. He made his debut for the first team in a 2–1 home win over Belasitsa Petrich on 26 November 2006 at the age of 17.

=== Borussia Dortmund ===
In August 2007, Aleksandrov was signed by Borussia Dortmund on a three-year contract. After joining Borussia, he played exclusively for the club's reserve team. He made his debut on 7 November 2008 in a 3–1 home victory over Köln II. On 20 March 2010, in a 2–0 away win over Wuppertaler SV Borussia Aleksandrov assisted Marcel Großkreutz for the second goal. He spent most of his time with Borussia II on the bench, making only five appearances.

=== Akademik Sofia ===
After his contract expired in late July 2010, Aleksandrov agreed to join Akademik Sofia. He made his debut for Akademik in their match against Sliven 2000 on 21 August, coming on as a second-half substitute for Asparuh Vasilev. He made his first start a week later against Litex Lovech.

=== Ludogorets Razgrad ===
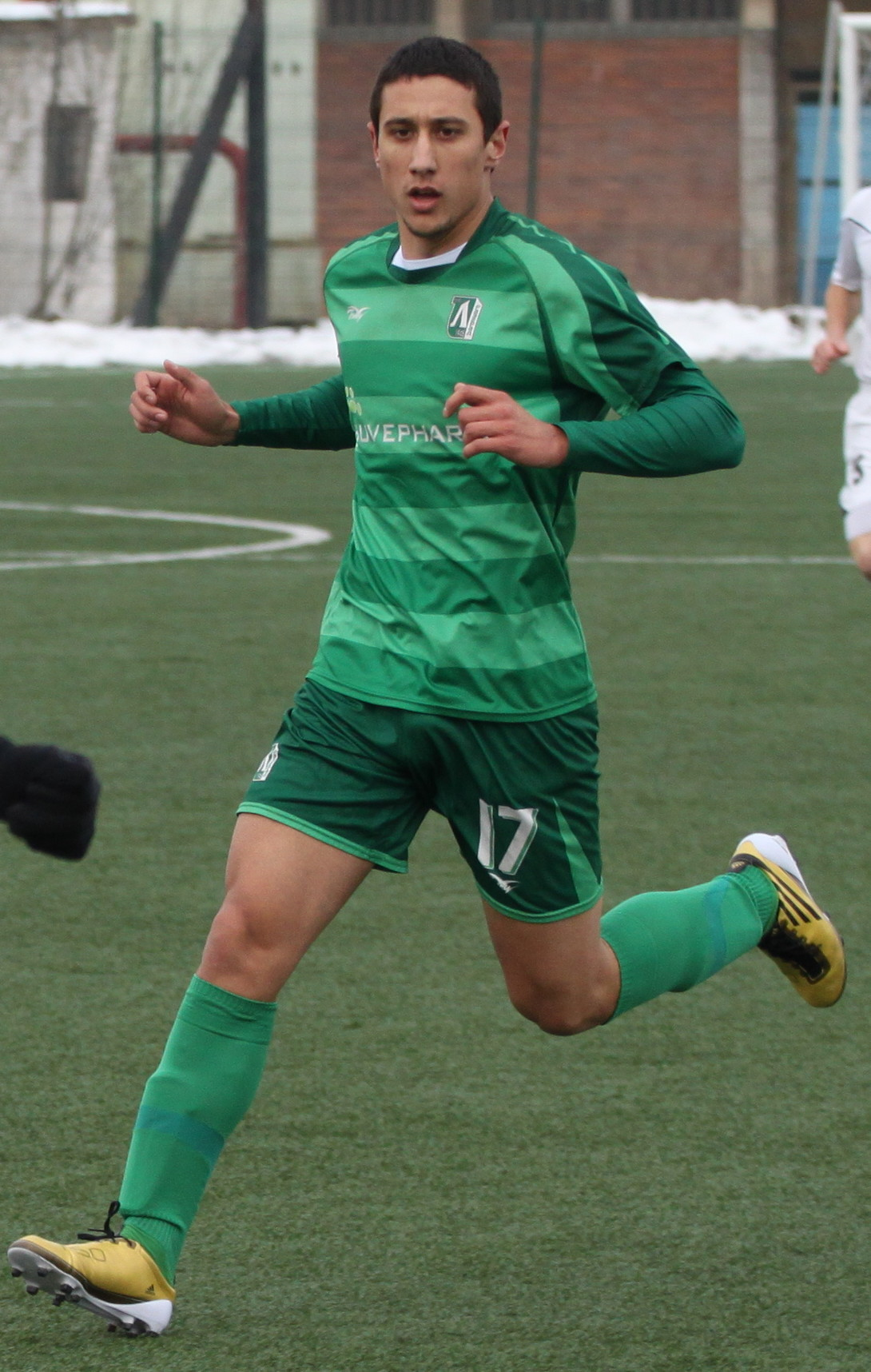
Aleksandrov playing for Ludogorets in 2011

On 22 December 2010, Aleksandrov joined Ludogorets Razgrad. On 19 March 2011, he scored a goal in his competitive debut for Ludogorets against Dobrudzha Dobrich.

Aleksandrov began the following 2011–12 season in fine form for Ludogorets. On 20 August he assisted Marcelinho for Ludogorets's third goal in a 4–0 home win over Vidima-Rakovski. Aleksandrov scored his first league goal of the season by netting Ludogorets's third goal in a 6–0 victory over Slavia Sofia on 11 September. On 18 September he scored his second goal of the season, netting the solitary strike in a 1–0 away victory over Cherno More. On 13 October, Aleksandrov signed a new two-year contract with Ludogorets.

On 31 July 2013, Aleksandrov netted the winning goal for Ludogorets in the 2–1 victory over FK Partizan in the first leg of a UEFA Champions League match.

In 2015–16 season Aleksandrov was dropped to the bench, making only four league appearances as a substitute during the first half of the campaign. He scored four goals in six matches for the club's reserve team in the B Group. He scored 4 goals in 6 matches for the team, playing only 3 for the first team.

=== Legia Warsaw ===
On 29 February 2016, Aleksandrov signed a one-and-a-half-year contract with Ekstraklasa club Legia Warsaw. He made his debut for the team on 5 March 2016 in a match against Górnik Zabrze won by Legia.

=== Arsenal Tula ===
On 10 February 2017, Legia announced the transfer of Aleksandrov to Russian Premier League club FC Arsenal Tula. On 8 July 2018, he extended his contract for another year with an additional 1-year extension option. In the opening game of the 2018–19 season against FC Dynamo Moscow he suffered an ACL tear, even though he didn't even remember the moment of the injury. He recovered from injury in January 2019 and was cleared for training, however, he re-aggravated the injury and the season opening game remained his only appearance of the 2018–19 season for Arsenal. On 9 August 2019, he left Arsenal as his contract expired.

=== Arda Kardzhali ===
On 2 September 2019, he signed a one-year contract with Bulgarian club Arda Kardzhali.

== International career ==
In October 2011, Aleksandrov earned his first call-up to the Bulgaria national side for a friendly match against Ukraine and a Euro 2012 qualifier against Wales. He was also selected for a friendly match against Hungary in February 2012, but did not take part in it. Aleksandrov earned his first cap on 5 March 2014, in the 2–1 home win over Belarus in a friendly match.

== Career statistics ==
=== Club ===
Appearances and goals by club, season and competition
Club	Season	League			National cup (Note: Includes Bulgarian Cup, Polish Cup, Russian Cup)		Europe		Other		Total	
Club	Season	Division	Apps	Goals	Apps	Goals	Apps	Goals	Apps	Goals	Apps	Goals
CSKA Sofia	2006–07	A Group	3	0	0	0	0	0	—		3	0
Borussia Dortmund II	2007–08	Regionalliga Nordost	0	0	—		—		—		0	0
Borussia Dortmund II	2008–09	Regionalliga Nordost	2	0	—		—		—		2	0
Borussia Dortmund II	2009–10	3. Liga	3	0	—		—		—		3	0
Borussia Dortmund II	Total		5	0	0	0	0	0	0	0	5	0
Akademik Sofia	2010–11	A Group	11	0	0	0	—		—		11	0
Ludogorets Razgrad	2010–11	B Group	10	2	0	0	—		—		10	2
Ludogorets Razgrad	2011–12	A Group	28	5	3	2	—		—		31	7
Ludogorets Razgrad	2012–13	A Group	15	5	0	0	1 (Note: Appearance(s) in UEFA Champions League)	0	1 (Note: Appearance in Bulgarian Super Cup)	0	17	5
Ludogorets Razgrad	2013–14	A Group	28	4	7	2	14 (Note: Five appearances and one goal in UEFA Champions League, nine appearances in UEFA Europa League)	1	0	0	49	7
Ludogorets Razgrad	2014–15	A Group	22	1	4	0	11	0	1	0	38	1
Ludogorets Razgrad	2015–16	A Group	3	0	1	0	1	0	0	0	5	0
Ludogorets Razgrad	Total		106	17	15	4	27	1	2	0	150	22
Ludogorets Razgrad II	2015–16	B Group	6	4	—		—		—		6	4
Legia Warsaw	2015–16	Ekstraklasa	11	0	3	0	—		—		14	0
Legia Warsaw	2016–17	Ekstraklasa	7	1	1	0	7	0	1 (Note: Appearance in Polish Super Cup)	0	16	1
Legia Warsaw	Total		18	1	4	0	7	0	1	0	30	1
Legia Warsaw	2016–17	III liga, gr. I	1	0	—		—		—		1	0
Arsenal Tula	2016–17	Russian Premier League	12	1	—		—		2 (Note: Appearances in Russian Premier League relegation play-offs)	0	14	1
Arsenal Tula	2017–18	Russian Premier League	19	0	1	0	—		—		20	0
Arsenal Tula	2018–19	Russian Premier League	1	0	0	0	—		—		1	0
Arsenal Tula	Total		32	1	1	0	0	0	2	0	35	1
Arda Kardzhali	2019–20	First League	0	0	0	0	—		—		0	0
Arda Kardzhali	2020–21	First League	10	0	1	0	—		—		11	0
Arda Kardzhali	Total		10	0	1	0	—		—		11	0
Slavia Sofia	2020–21	First League	14	0	3	0	—		—		17	0
Career total			206	23	24	4	34	1	5	0	269	28

=== International ===
Appearances and goals by national team and year
National team	Year	Apps	Goals
Bulgaria
Bulgaria	2014	5	0
Bulgaria	2015	6	1
Bulgaria	2016	7	2
Total		18	3

Scores and results list Bulgaria's goal tally first, score column indicates score after each Aleksandrov goal.

List of international goals scored by Mihail Aleksandrov
No.	Date	Venue	Opponent	Score	Result	Competition
1	13 October 2015	Vasil Levski National Stadium, Sofia, Bulgaria	Azerbaijan	1–0	2–0	UEFA Euro 2016 qualifying
2	3 June 2016	Toyota Stadium, Toyota, Japan	Japan	1–6	2–7	2016 Kirin Cup
3	7 October 2016	Stade de France, Saint-Denis, France	France	1–0	1–4	2018 FIFA World Cup qualification

== Honours ==
Ludogorets

- A Group: 2011–12, 2012–13, 2013–14, 2014–15
- Bulgarian Cup: 2011–12, 2013–14
- Bulgarian Supercup: 2012, 2014

Legia Warsaw

- Ekstraklasa: 2015–16, 2016–17
- Polish Cup: 2015–16
