= Franck Manga Guela =

Ivorian footballer

Did'dy Guela
Personal information
- Full name: Franck Manga Guela
- Date of birth: 19 June 1986 (age 40)
- Place of birth: Abidjan, Ivory Coast
- Height: 1.79 m (5 ft 10 in)
- Positions: Left winger; attacking midfielder

Youth career
- 2001–2003: Académie de Sol Beni

Senior career*
Years	Team	Apps	(Gls)
2003–2004	Mamelodi Sundowns	11	(1)
2004–2005	Anagennisi Karditsa	26	(3)
2005–2006	Veria	25	(5)
2006–2007	Kerkyra	27	(6)
2007–2008	Dinamo Zagreb	24	(2)
2008–2009	AEL	13	(1)
2009–2011	Arminia Bielefeld	38	(2)
2012–2013	Ludogorets Razgrad	12	(1)
2013–2014	Apollon Smyrnis	13	(1)
2014–2016	Al Urooba	32	(6)
2016–2017	Al Hamriyah	0	(0)
- * Club domestic league appearances and goals

Franck Manga "Did'dy" Guela (born 19 June 1986) is an Ivorian former professional footballer who played as a left winger or attacking midfielder.

== Career ==
Guela was born in Abidjan. After graduating from the Jean-Marc Guillou's Académie de Sol Beni, his agent, Eleftherios Sidiropoulos, brought him to one of his European teams, Dinamo Zagreb. A highlight of his career was the goal he scored for Kerkyra against Panathinaikos during the 2006–07 Super League Greece, helping his team to a 3–1 victory.

On 22 May 2007, Guela joined Croatian champions Dinamo Zagreb. He left on 18 August 2008 and joined on 4 October 2008 AEL as an associate. He earned the right to play in official matches as of 26 November 2008.

After one year, Guela left the club to sign on 31 August 2009 for Arminia Bielefeld. He made his debut goal at home against Greuther Fürth, which turned out to be the winning goal.
