= Ivaylo Petev =

Bulgarian footballer and manager (born 1975)

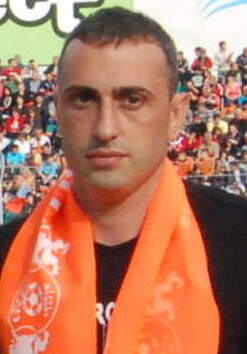
- Petev in 2010

Personal information
- Full name: Ivaylo Bogdanov Petev
- Date of birth: 9 July 1975 (age 51)
- Place of birth: Lovech, Bulgaria
- Height: 1.81 m (5 ft 11 in)
- Position: Midfielder

Team information
- Current team: Mardin 1969 (manager)

Youth career
- –1994: Litex Lovech

Senior career*
| Years | Team | Apps | (Gls) |
| 1996–2002 | Litex Lovech | 86 | (15) |
| 1995–1996 | → Parva Atomna (loan) | | |
| 1998 | → Olimpik Teteven (loan) | 6 | (0) |
| 1999 | → Spartak Varna (loan) | 19 | (2) |
| 2002 | Cherno More Varna | 10 | (1) |
| 2003 | Litex Lovech | 3 | (0) |
| 2003–2004 | Spartak Varna | 13 | (3) |
| 2004–2005 | Rodopa Smolyan | 28 | (4) |
| 2006 | Dunav Ruse | 26 | (2) |
| 2007 | Marek Dupnitsa | 10 | (1) |
| 2007 | Trikala | 22 | (1) |
| 2008–2009 | Lyubimets | 28 | (5) |
| 2009–2010 | Etar 1924 | 23 | (5) |
| Total | | 274 | (39) |

Managerial career
- 2008–2009: Lyubimets
- 2010–2013: Ludogorets Razgrad
- 2013: Levski Sofia
- 2013–2014: AEL Limassol
- 2014–2016: Bulgaria
- 2016–2017: Dinamo Zagreb
- 2017–2018: Omonia
- 2018–2019: Al Qadsiah
- 2019–2020: Jagiellonia Białystok
- 2021–2022: Bosnia and Herzegovina
- 2023: Ludogorets Razgrad
- 2023–2024: Universitatea Craiova
- 2025: Baniyas
- 2026–: Mardin 1969
- * Club domestic league appearances and goals

Ivaylo Bogdanov Petev (Bulgarian: Ивайло Богданов Петев; born 9 July 1975) is a Bulgarian football manager and former player who played as a midfielder. He is the manager of TFF 1. Lig club Mardin 1969.

Petev spent his whole career playing in Bulgaria, apart from a season at Greek club Trikala. He was most successful early in his career with hometown club Litex Lovech.

After finishing his playing career, Petev became a manager, managing and having the most success at Bulgarian club Ludogorets Razgrad. He also worked as a manager in Cyprus, Croatia, Saudi Arabia and Poland. Petev worked as head coach of the Bulgaria and Bosnia and Herzegovina national team as well.

== Playing career ==
Petev previously played as a midfielder for Litex Lovech, Spartak Varna, Rodopa Smolyan and Marek Dupnitsa.

== Managerial career ==
=== Ludogorets Razgrad ===
After a short spell at Lyubimets as a player-manager in 2009, Petev was appointed as manager of Ludogorets Razgrad, following Kiril Domuschiev's purchase of the club. He managed to lead the team to a promotion to the top division of Bulgarian football, followed by two A Group titles (the first in the club's history), a Bulgarian Cup and a Bulgarian Supercup. On 21 July 2013, Ludogorets replaced Petev with Stoycho Stoev after poor performances against Lyubimets and Slovan Bratislava in the first leg of the UEFA Champions League qualifying rounds.

=== Levski Sofia ===
On 8 October 2013, Petev became manager of Levski Sofia, which proved unpopular because of his past club allegiances. At his public unveiling, gathered Levski supporters stripped off his shirt in front of the press, which led to Petev's resignation a day later.

=== AEL Limassol ===
In October 2013, Petev signed a contract with Cypriot side AEL Limassol. He led AEL to the first place in the regular season's league table, three points ahead of Apollon Limassol and APOEL Nicosia, which resulted in the qualification for the play-offs. Although leading the group until the last round, AEL lost the title in the decisive match against APOEL. Despite the defeat, AEL qualified for the 2014–15 UEFA Champions League season. Petev led the team to a 1–0 win against Zenit Saint Petersburg in the first leg of the UEFA Champions League third qualifying round, but his team failed to keep the advantage and lost the second leg 0–3, thus being eliminated and placed in the UEFA Europa League. AEL were drawn against English team, Tottenham Hotspur, but were eliminated after losing 5–1 on aggregate.

=== Bulgaria ===
In December 2014, Petev was officially appointed by the Bulgarian Football Union as head coach of the Bulgaria national team. In his first official game in charge, Bulgaria played a 2–2 draw at home against Italy despite leading until the 84th minute thanks to first half goals from Ivelin Popov and Iliyan Mitsanski. The team eventually finished in fourth place and was unable to qualify for UEFA Euro 2016. During his tenure, Petev was interested in strengthening the national side by securing the services of a number of foreign-born players with Bulgarian roots such as Borys Tashchy and Nikola Vujadinović, though some issues, mainly relating to the paperwork, prevented them from making their debuts.

=== Dinamo Zagreb ===
On 27 September 2016, Petev became manager of Croatian team Dinamo Zagreb. He was sacked on 13 July 2017, after Dinamo finished the season trophyless for the first time in twelve years, and after he fell out with several players including Ante Ćorić, Sammir and Junior Fernandes.

=== Short tenures in Cyprus, Saudi Arabia and Poland ===
After Dinamo, Petev worked as a manager at Cypriot club Omonia, Saudi Arabian side Al Qadsiah, and Polish club Jagiellonia Białystok.

=== Bosnia and Herzegovina ===
On 21 January 2021, it was announced that the Bosnia and Herzegovina FA had named Petev as the new Bosnia and Herzegovina national team head coach, ahead of the country's 2022 FIFA World Cup qualifiers.

He debuted as head coach on 24 March 2021, in a World Cup qualifier game against Finland, which ended as a 2–2 draw. By the end of the qualifying campaign, Bosnia and Herzegovina won only seven points, making it the worst qualifying campaign in their history. On 23 September 2022, Bosnia and Herzegovina topped their group in the UEFA Nations League, and got promoted to League A.

Despite promoting the team to the UEFA Nations League A, Petev's contract expired and he was released from his duties as head coach in December 2022, before the start of Bosnia and Herzegovina's UEFA Euro 2024 qualifying campaign.

=== Return to Ludogorets ===
In March 2023, Petev returned as manager of Ludogorets Razgrad, succeeding Ante Šimundža. He won the league title and the cup in his first months back, becoming the first manager to complete the double with the club in two separate spells, and left in October 2023 having won 25 of his 39 matches in charge.

=== Universitatea Craiova ===
In November 2023, Petev was appointed head coach of Liga I side Universitatea Craiova, saying on his presentation that it was the club that had wanted him most. He left in April 2024 after 20 matches, of which he won ten.

=== Baniyas ===
In May 2025, Petev was appointed head coach of UAE Pro League club Baniyas. He departed on 20 September, having taken one point from his six matches in charge.

=== Mardin 1969 ===
On 29 September 2026, Petev was appointed head coach of TFF 1. Lig club Mardin 1969, who had parted with Ahmet Cingöz five days earlier. It was his first job in Turkish football.

== Personal life ==
In December 2014, Petev appeared on Slavi's Show. He is married and has a daughter.

== Managerial statistics ==
As of 15 October 2026

Managerial record by team and tenure
| Team | Nat. | From | To | Record | | | | | | | |
| Team | Nat. | From | To | G | W | D | L | GF | GA | GD | Win % |
|---|---|---|---|---|---|---|---|---|---|---|---|
| Ludogorets Razgrad | (Bulgaria) | 1 July 2010 | 21 July 2013 | 94 | 62 | 19 | 13 | 186 | 66 | +120 | 65.96 |
| Levski Sofia | (Bulgaria) | 8 October 2013 | 9 October 2013 | 0 | 0 | 0 | 0 | 0 | 0 | +0 | — |
| AEL Limassol | (Cyprus) | 25 October 2013 | 17 November 2014 | 43 | 26 | 8 | 9 | 78 | 40 | +38 | 60.47 |
| Bulgaria | (Bulgaria) | 17 December 2014 | 27 September 2016 | 13 | 5 | 2 | 6 | 14 | 25 | −11 | 38.46 |
| Dinamo Zagreb | (Croatia) | 29 September 2016 | 13 July 2017 | 35 | 23 | 5 | 7 | 60 | 26 | +34 | 65.71 |
| Omonia | (Cyprus) | 14 December 2017 | 21 March 2018 | 15 | 8 | 1 | 6 | 31 | 21 | +10 | 53.33 |
| Al Qadsiah | (Saudi Arabia) | 5 November 2018 | 10 March 2019 | 15 | 5 | 2 | 8 | 17 | 20 | −3 | 33.33 |
| Jagiellonia Białystok | (Poland) | 30 December 2019 | 31 July 2020 | 17 | 6 | 5 | 6 | 17 | 25 | −8 | 35.29 |
| Bosnia and Herzegovina | (Bosnia and Herzegovina) | 21 January 2021 | 31 December 2022 | 20 | 6 | 7 | 7 | 19 | 24 | −5 | 30.00 |
| Ludogorets Razgrad | (Bulgaria) | 7 March 2023 | 27 October 2023 | 42 | 25 | 5 | 12 | 89 | 49 | +40 | 59.52 |
| Universitatea Craiova | (Romania) | 7 November 2023 | 10 April 2024 | 20 | 10 | 5 | 5 | 34 | 27 | +7 | 50.00 |
| Baniyas | (United Arab Emirates) | 28 May 2025 | 19 September 2025 | 6 | 0 | 1 | 5 | 2 | 11 | −9 | 0.00 |
| Mardin 1969 | (Turkey) | 29 September 2026 | Present | 2 | 2 | 0 | 0 | 3 | 1 | +2 | 100.00 |
| Total | | | | 321 | 178 | 60 | 83 | 550 | 334 | +216 | 55.45 |

== Honours ==
=== Player ===
Litex Lovech

- Bulgarian B Group: 1996–97
- Bulgarian Cup: 2000–01

=== Manager ===
Ludogorets Razgrad

- Bulgarian First League: 2011–12, 2012–13, 2022–23
- Bulgarian B Group (East): 2010–11
- Bulgarian Cup: 2011–12, 2022–23
- Bulgarian Supercup: 2012

Dinamo Zagreb

- Croatian Cup runner-up: 2016–17
