= Yordan Minev =

Bulgarian footballer (born 1980)

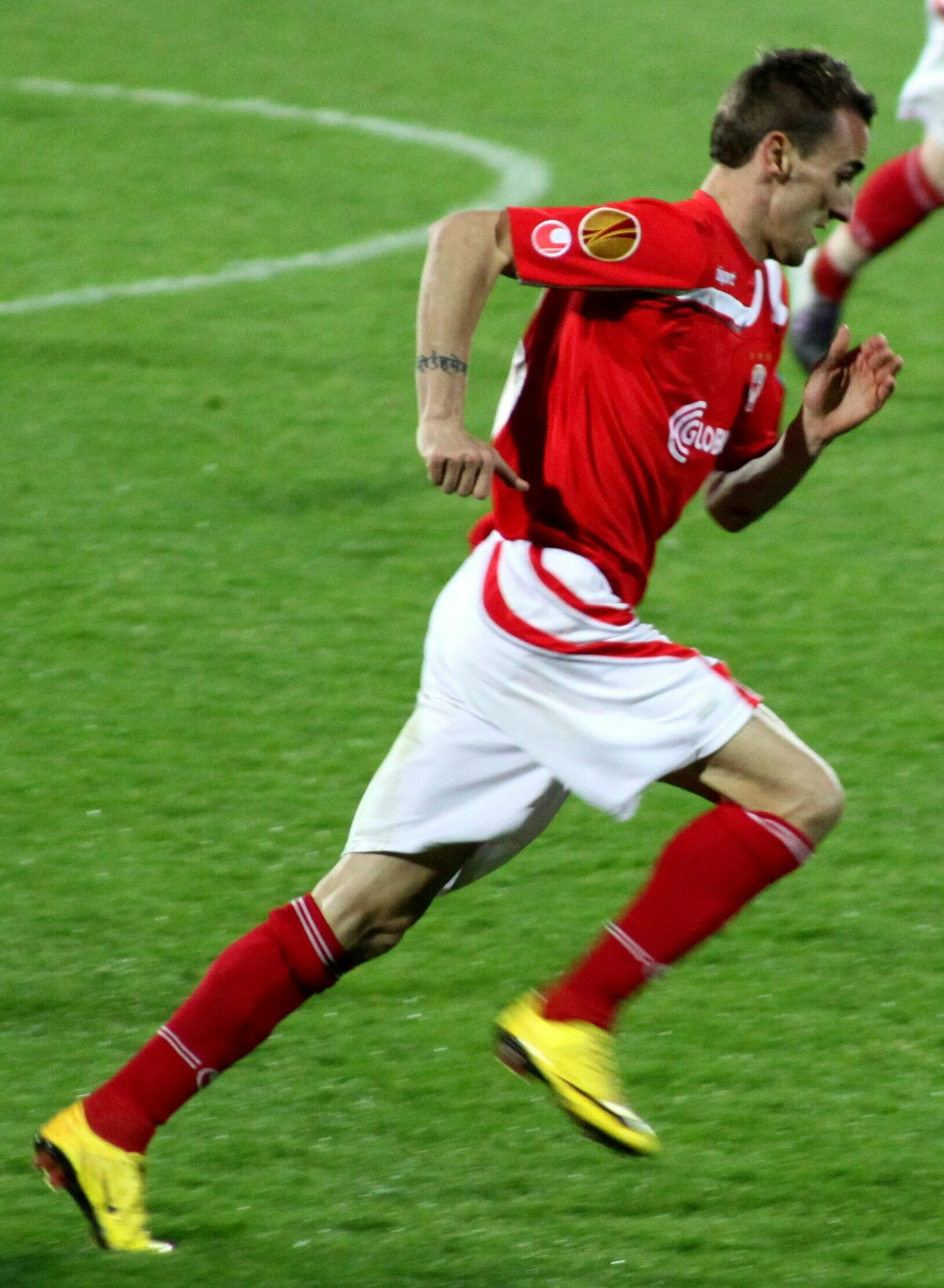
- Minev with CSKA in 2010

Personal information
- Full name: Yordan Milchev Minev
- Date of birth: 14 October 1980 (age 46)
- Place of birth: Pazardzhik, Bulgaria
- Height: 1.74 m (5 ft 9 in)
- Positions: Right back; left back

Youth career
- Hebar Pazardzhik

Senior career*
Years	Team	Apps	(Gls)
2000–2001	Hebar Pazardzhik	5	(1)
2001–2003	Belasitsa Petrich	43	(1)
2004	Rodopa Smolyan	10	(0)
2004	Hebar Pazardzhik	15	(1)
2005–2008	Botev Plovdiv	105	(4)
2009–2011	CSKA Sofia	42	(1)
2011	Botev Plovdiv	10	(1)
2011–2017	Ludogorets Razgrad	122	(1)
2017–2018	Botev Plovdiv	47	(0)
2019	Tsarsko Selo	22	(0)
2020	Vitosha Bistritsa	2	(0)
2020–2021	Spartak Plovdiv	27	(4)
2021–2022	Hebar Pazardzhik II	20	(4)
2022	Vihren Sandanski	7	(2)
2023–2025	Rilski Sportist	48	(7)

International career
2008–2016	Bulgaria	24	(0)

Managerial career
- 2022–2023: CSKA 1948 III
- * Club domestic league appearances and goals as of 12:14, 9 November 2023 (UTC)

Yordan Milchev Minev (Bulgarian Cyrillic: Йордан Минев; born 14 October 1980) is a Bulgarian former professional footballer who played as a right-back. He spent most of his career at Botev Plovdiv, CSKA Sofia and Ludogorets Razgrad, winning six consecutive Bulgarian First League titles with Ludogorets. Minev represented the Bulgaria national team on 24 occasions from 2008 to 2016.

== Club career ==
Yordan Minev started his career in home town Pazardzhik for local team Hebar. Between 2001 and 2003, Minev played in PFC Belasitsa from Petrich. Then, from January 2004 until June 2004 he played in Rodopa from Smolyan. In 2005, he joined Botev Plovdiv.

=== CSKA Sofia ===
In January 2009, Minev signed with CSKA Sofia. He gradually established himself as the first choice right back in the team after Luboslav Penev's appointment as manager. On 23 May 2009, Minev received a second yellow card in the redmen's match against Lokomotiv Sofia.

Minev was released from CSKA in March 2011, as he was unable to stake a claim to first choice defender status under head coach Milen Radukanov.

=== Ludogorets Razgrad ===
On 30 May 2011, Minev signed a contract with newly promoted Ludogorets Razgrad. He made his competitive debut for Ludogorets on 6 August, in a 0–0 home league draw against Lokomotiv Plovdiv. In his first season playing for Ludogorets, Minev made 28 appearances in the A group and ended the season winning his first league golden medal.

On 26 September 2013, he was alleged to have failed a doping test by FIFA (in reality the medical substances had been legally administered by a doctor due to a shoulder injury of the player and there had been a misunderstanding with regard to the terminology used), but was almost immediately cleared of any wrongdoing.

On 22 October 2014, Minev scored his first goal for Ludogorets, scoring a crucial last-minute winning goal in a 1–0 home win over Basel in the group stage of the Champions League.

=== Botev Plovdiv ===
On 29 June 2017 Yordan Minev made a debut after his return to Botev Plovdiv during the 3–1 away win over Partizani Tirana in the 1st qualifying round of UEFA Europa League.

On 29 April 2018 Minev provided an assist and was sent off in the last minute of the dramatic 2–1 home win over CSKA Sofia.

== Notable accomplishments ==
Minev is currently in the "top 20 footballer" club when it comes to the number of matches played for Bulgarian clubs in European competitions. As of 3 August 2017, he has appeared in 56 games in total – 13 for CSKA Sofia, 37 for Ludogorets Razgrad, and 6 for Botev Plovdiv.

== International career ==
Yordan Minev made his debut for the national side on 19 November 2008 in the 1–6 loss against Serbia in a friendly match, which was also Savo Milošević's farewell appearance. He played over the course of the last 20 minutes of the game, during which Bulgaria did not concede.

In October 2011, Minev was recalled to the national team by caretaker manager Mihail Madanski for the Euro 2012 qualifier against Wales, but remained an unused substitute for the match. He played as a starter for the first time on 26 May 2012 (alongside his twin brother Veselin Minev), in the 2–1 away win over the Netherlands in an exhibition game. He was an everpresent part of the Bulgarian defense during the 2014 World Cup qualifiers, appearing in 8 of the 10 matches.

== Career statistics ==
=== International ===
Bulgaria national team
Year	Apps	Goals
2008	1	0
2009	0	0
2010	0	0
2011	0	0
2012	7	0
2013	7	0
2014	3	0
2015	6	0
Total	24	0

== Family ==
He has a twin brother, Veselin, who is also a footballer.

== Honours ==
=== Club ===
Ludogorets

- A Group (6): 2011–12, 2012–13, 2013–14, 2014–15, 2015–16, 2016–17
- Bulgarian Cup (2): 2011–12, 2013–14
- Bulgarian Supercup (2): 2012, 2014
