= Ľubomír Guldan =

Slovak footballer

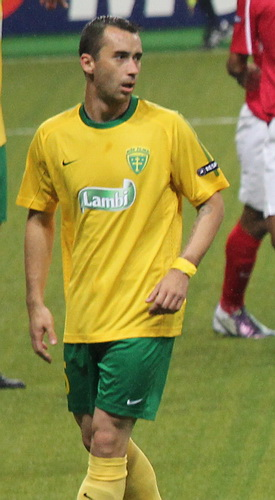

Personal information
- Date of birth: 30 January 1983 (age 43)
- Place of birth: Banská Bystrica, Czechoslovakia
- Height: 1.83 m (6 ft 0 in)
- Position: Centre-back

Youth career
- Veľké Úľany
- Senec

Senior career*
Years	Team	Apps	(Gls)
2001–2007	Senec		
2007–2008	Thun	24	(0)
2009–2011	Žilina	63	(3)
2011–2013	Ludogorets Razgrad	50	(2)
2013–2020	Zagłębie Lubin	244	(10)

International career
2012–2014	Slovakia	5	(1)
- * Club domestic league appearances and goals

Ľubomír Guldan (born 30 January 1983) is a Slovak former professional footballer who played as a centre-back.

== Club career ==
In August 2011, Guldan joined Bulgaria side Ludogorets Razgrad, signing a deal for two years. On 1 July 2013, he moved from Ludogorets Razgrad to Polish club Zagłębie Lubin on a two-year contract.

== International career ==
Guldan represented the Slovakia national under-20 football team in the FIFA World Youth Championship in 2003. In May 2012, he was called up to the senior team. On 30 May 2012, Guldan earned his first cap after coming on as a second-half substitute for Marek Čech in the 0–2 loss against the Netherlands in a friendly match.

== Post-playing career ==
Shortly after his mid-season retirement, on 8 January 2021 Guldan took on a role of sporting director of Zagłębie Lubin. He held this position until 16 November 2022.

== Career statistics ==
=== International ===
Scores and results list Slovakia's goal tally first, score column indicates score after each Guldan goal.

List of international goals scored by Ľubomír Guldan
No.	Date	Venue	Opponent	Score	Result	Competition
1	15 August 2012	TRE-FOR Park, Odense, Denmark	Denmark	3–1	3–1	Friendly

== Honours ==
MŠK Žilina

- Slovak First Football League: 2009–10

Ludogorets

- Bulgarian A Group: 2011–12, 2012–13
- Bulgarian Cup: 2011–12
- Bulgarian Supercup: 2012

Zagłębie Lubin

- I liga: 2014–15
