= 2013–14 PFC CSKA Sofia season =

CSKA Sofia
2013–14 season
- Chairman: Titan AS (until 9 July); Red Champions Group (since 9 July)
- Manager: Hristo Stoichkov (until 8 July); Stoycho Mladenov (since 11 July 2013)
- A Group: Second place
- Bulgarian Cup: Second round
- Top goalscorer: League: Gargorov (9); All: Gargorov (9)
- Highest home attendance: 13,950 vs Levski (19 October 2013)
- Lowest home attendance: 380 vs Lyubimets (14 December 2013)
Home colours	Away colours

The 2013–14 season was PFC CSKA Sofia's 66th consecutive season in A Group. This article shows player statistics and all matches (official and friendly) that the club will play during the 2013–14 season.

== Players ==
=== Squad stats ===
Appearances for competitive matches only

No.	Pos	Nat	Player	Total		A Group		Bulgarian Cup	
No.	Pos	Nat	Player	Apps	Goals	Apps	Goals	Apps	Goals
2	DF	(Bulgaria) BUL	Zdravko Iliev	0	0	0	0	0	0
4	MF	(Nigeria) NGR	Sunny	8	0	8	0	0	0
5	MF	(Bulgaria) BUL	Todor Yanchev	31	1	25+2	1	4	0
6	DF	(Senegal) SEN	Jackson Mendy	38	0	34	0	4	0
7	MF	(Portugal) POR	Toni Silva	15	3	6+9	3	0	0
8	MF	(Bulgaria) BUL	Boris Galchev	5	0	2+3	0	0	0
11	MF	(Serbia) SRB	Nemanja Milisavljević	38	3	32+3	3	3	0
12	GK	(Czech Republic) CZE	Tomáš Černý	21	0	20	0	1	0
14	DF	(Bulgaria) BUL	Valentin Iliev	32	4	28	4	4	0
16	MF	(Bulgaria) BUL	Petar Vitanov	1	0	0+1	0	0	0
17	FW	(Bulgaria) BUL	Martin Petrov	19	3	9+8	3	2	0
18	MF	(Bulgaria) BUL	Ivaylo Chochev	38	8	33+2	7	3	1
19	DF	(Bulgaria) BUL	Apostol Popov	35	1	31+2	1	2	0
20	MF	(Benin) BEN	Omar Kossoko	28	5	15+11	5	1+1	0
21	DF	(Bulgaria) BUL	Ventsislav Vasilev	21	4	15+3	3	3	1
23	MF	(Bulgaria) BUL	Emil Gargorov	41	9	38	9	2+1	0
24	DF	(Bulgaria) BUL	Yuliyan Chapaev	0	0	0	0	0	0
25	MF	(Bulgaria) BUL	Pol Aleksandrov	0	0	0	0	0	0
26	FW	(Argentina) ARG	Guido Di Vanni	7	0	2+5	0	0	0
27	DF	(Spain) ESP	Brian Herrero	0	0	0	0	0	0
28	MF	(Serbia) SRB	Ivan Marković	10	1	2+8	1	0	0
30	DF	(Bulgaria) BUL	Vasil Popov	0	0	0	0	0	0
37	DF	(France) FRA	Jérémy Faug-Porret	28	0	25+1	0	2	0
45	FW	(Bulgaria) BUL	Grigor Dolapchiev	12	4	0+9	3	2+1	1
48	DF	(Bulgaria) BUL	Bozhidar Chorbadzhiyski	0	0	0	0	0	0
66	DF	(Bulgaria) BUL	Plamen Krachunov	8	1	6+2	1	0	0
71	MF	(Bulgaria) BUL	Anton Karachanakov	18	2	7+9	2	0+2	0
73	FW	(Bulgaria) BUL	Ivan Stoyanov	15	3	12+3	3	0	0
92	GK	(Algeria) ALG	Raïs M'Bolhi	19	0	17	0	2	0
99	GK	(Bulgaria) BUL	Stoyan Kolev	2	0	1	0	1	0
Players sold or loaned out after the start of the season:
1	GK	(Bulgaria) BUL	Anatoli Gospodinov	0	0	0	0	0	0
4	FW	(Bulgaria) BUL	Rangel Abushev	3	0	2+1	0	0	0
7	FW	(Mali) MLI	Mamady Sidibé	15	2	7+4	1	1+3	1
8	MF	(Bulgaria) BUL	Nikolay Dyulgerov	8	0	4+3	0	0+1	0
9	FW	(North Macedonia) MKD	Hristijan Kirovski	10	2	3+6	1	0+1	1
10	MF	(Brazil) BRA	Marcinho	26	6	20+2	4	4	2
15	MF	(England) ENG	Brian Howard	13	0	3+8	0	1+1	0
25	DF	(Bulgaria) BUL	Angel Granchov	4	0	3	0	1	0
41	FW	(Portugal) POR	Bruno Moreira	11	1	5+4	1	1+1	0
77	MF	(Brazil) BRA	Revson	5	0	3+2	0	0	0

As of 17 May 2014

=== Top scorers ===
Place	Position	Nation	Number	Name	A Group	Bulgarian Cup	Total
1	MF	(Bulgaria)	23	Emil Gargorov	9	0	9
2	MF	(Bulgaria)	18	Ivaylo Chochev	7	1	8
3	MF	(Brazil)	10	Marcinho	4	2	6
4	FW	(Benin)	20	Omar Kossoko	5	0	5
5	DF	(Bulgaria)	14	Valentin Iliev	4	0	4
#	DF	(Bulgaria)	21	Ventsislav Vasilev	3	1	4
#	FW	(Bulgaria)	45	Grigor Dolapchiev	3	1	4
8	MF	(Portugal)	7	Toni Silva	3	0	3
#	MF	(Serbia)	11	Nemanja Milisavljević	3	0	3
#	MF	(Bulgaria)	17	Martin Petrov	3	0	3
#	MF	(Bulgaria)	73	Ivan Stoyanov	3	0	3
12	FW	(Mali)	7	Mamady Sidibé	1	1	2
#	FW	(North Macedonia)	9	Hristijan Kirovski	1	1	2
#	MF	(Bulgaria)	71	Anton Karachanakov	2	0	2
15	MF	(Bulgaria)	5	Todor Yanchev	1	0	1
#	DF	(Bulgaria)	19	Apostol Popov	1	0	1
#	MF	(Serbia)	28	Ivan Marković	1	0	1
#	FW	(Portugal)	41	Bruno Moreira	1	0	1
#	DF	(Bulgaria)	66	Plamen Krachunov	1	0	1
				TOTALS	56	7	63

As of 17 May 2014

=== Disciplinary record ===
Number	Nation	Position	Name	A Group		Bulgarian Cup		Total	
Number	Nation	Position	Name	Yellow card	Red card	Yellow card	Red card	Yellow card	Red card
14	(Bulgaria)	DF	Valentin Iliev	11	0	1	0	12	0
37	(France)	DF	Jérémy Faug-Porret	11	1	0	0	11	1
6	(Senegal)	DF	Jackson Mendy	8	1	1	0	9	1
18	(Bulgaria)	MF	Ivaylo Chochev	5	0	1	0	6	0
19	(Bulgaria)	DF	Apostol Popov	4	1	1	0	5	1
21	(Bulgaria)	DF	Ventsislav Vasilev	5	1	0	0	5	1
11	(Serbia)	MF	Nemanja Milisavljević	5	0	0	0	5	0
5	(Bulgaria)	MF	Todor Yanchev	4	0	0	0	4	0
7	(Mali)	FW	Mamady Sidibé	2	0	2	0	4	0
7	(Portugal)	MF	Toni Silva	4	0	0	0	4	0
10	(Brazil)	MF	Marcinho	4	0	0	0	4	0
15	(England)	MF	Brian Howard	4	0	0	0	4	0
23	(Bulgaria)	FW	Emil Gargorov	4	0	0	0	4	0
66	(Bulgaria)	DF	Plamen Krachunov	4	0	0	0	4	0
4	(Nigeria)	MF	Sunny	3	0	0	0	3	0
12	(Czech Republic)	GK	Tomáš Černý	3	0	0	0	3	0
8	(Bulgaria)	MF	Boris Galchev	2	1	0	0	2	1
20	(Benin)	MF	Omar Kossoko	2	1	0	0	2	1
92	(Algeria)	GK	Raïs M'Bolhi	2	1	0	0	2	1
8	(Bulgaria)	MF	Nikolay Dyulgerov	2	0	0	0	2	0
9	(North Macedonia)	FW	Hristijan Kirovski	2	0	0	0	2	0
71	(Bulgaria)	MF	Anton Karachanakov	1	0	1	0	2	0
26	(Argentina)	FW	Guido Di Vanni	1	0	0	0	1	0
28	(Serbia)	MF	Ivan Marković	1	0	0	0	1	0
73	(Bulgaria)	FW	Ivan Stoyanov	1	0	0	0	1	0
77	(Brazil)	MF	Revson	1	0	0	0	1	0
			TOTALS	96	7	7	0	103	7

As of 17 May 2014

== Players in/out ==
=== Summer transfers ===
In: Note: Flags indicate national team as defined under FIFA eligibility rules; some limited exceptions apply. Players may hold more than one non-FIFA nationality.

No.	Pos.	Nation	Player
2	MF	BUL	Radoy Bozhilov (From Youth team)
4	FW	BUL	Rangel Abushev (From Lokomotiv Plovdiv)
5	MF	BUL	Todor Yanchev (free agent)
6	DF	SEN	Jackson Mendy (From Levadiakos)
7	FW	MLI	Mamady Sidibé (From Stoke City)
8	MF	BUL	Nikolay Dyulgerov (free agent)
9	FW	MKD	Hristijan Kirovski (From Iraklis)
11	MF	SRB	Nemanja Milisavljević (From Ludogorets Razgrad)
14	DF	BUL	Valentin Iliev (free agent)
15	MF	ENG	Brian Howard (free agent)
16	MF	BUL	Petar Vitanov (From Youth team)
17	FW	BUL	Martin Petrov (free agent)
19	DF	BUL	Apostol Popov (free agent)
20	MF	BEN	Omar Kossoko (From Servette)
23	MF	BUL	Emil Gargorov (From Ludogorets Razgrad)
27	DF	BUL	Asen Boychev (From Youth team)
37	DF	FRA	Jérémy Faug-Porret (free agent)
41	FW	POR	Bruno Moreira (Loaned from Nacional da Madeira)
42	DF	BUL	Hristo Martinski (From Youth team)
45	FW	BUL	Grigor Dolapchiev (From Youth team)
77	MF	BRA	Revson (Loaned from Nacional da Madeira)
92	GK	ALG	Raïs M'Bolhi (From Krylia Sovetov)
99	GK	BUL	Stoyan Kolev (From Chernomorets Burgas)

Out: Note: Flags indicate national team as defined under FIFA eligibility rules; some limited exceptions apply. Players may hold more than one non-FIFA nationality.

No.	Pos.	Nation	Player
1	GK	BUL	Anatoli Gospodinov (loaned at Vitosha Bistritsa)
3	DF	BUL	Milen Kikarin (loaned at Slivnishki Geroy)
4	DF	BUL	Mihail Venkov (Terminated contract)
4	FW	BUL	Rangel Abushev (Released)
5	DF	BUL	Kostadin Stoyanov (Released)
6	DF	BUL	Plamen Krachunov (Terminated contract)
7	FW	BUL	Spas Delev (Terminated contract)
8	MF	BRA	Lucas Sasha (Terminated contract)
10	MF	POR	Serginho (Terminated contract)
11	DF	BUL	Ivan Bandalovski (Terminated contract)
14	FW	TOG	Serge Nyuiadzi (Terminated contract)
15	FW	BUL	Stanko Yovchev (Terminated contract)
16	MF	BUL	Aleksandar Yakimov (Terminated contract, previously on loan from Botev Vratsa)
17	FW	MAD	Anicet Andrianantenaina (to Botev Plovdiv)
22	FW	BUL	Martin Kamburov (Released)
23	FW	BRA	Michel Platini (to Ludogorets Razgrad)
27	MF	BUL	Milen Ivanov (Terminated contract)
70	MF	URU	Ignacio Lores Varela (Loan return to Palermo)
85	GK	BUL	Bozhidar Stoychev (to Lokomotiv Plovdiv)
99	FW	CMR	Njongo Priso (Terminated contract)
—	MF	BUL	Vladimir Baharov (Terminated contract, previously loaned at Slivnishki Geroi)
—	MF	BUL	Kristiyan Petrov (Terminated contract, previously loaned at Botev Vratsa)

=== Winter transfers ===
In: Note: Flags indicate national team as defined under FIFA eligibility rules; some limited exceptions apply. Players may hold more than one non-FIFA nationality.

No.	Pos.	Nation	Player
2	DF	BUL	Zdravko Iliev (From Beroe Stara Zagora)
4	MF	NGR	Sunny (free agent)
7	MF	POR	Toni Silva (free agent)
8	MF	BUL	Boris Galchev (From Botev Plovdiv)
24	MF	BUL	Yuliyan Chapaev (From Youth team)
25	MF	BUL	Pol Aleksandrov (From Youth team)
26	FW	ARG	Guido Di Vanni (From Guarani)
27	DF	ESP	Brian Herrero (From Braga B)
28	MF	SRB	Ivan Marković (free agent)
30	DF	BUL	Vasil Popov (From Youth team)
48	DF	BUL	Bozhidar Chorbadzhiyski (From Youth team)
66	DF	BUL	Plamen Krachunov (From Lokomotiv Plovdiv)
73	FW	BUL	Ivan Stoyanov (From Ludogorets Razgrad)

Out: Note: Flags indicate national team as defined under FIFA eligibility rules; some limited exceptions apply. Players may hold more than one non-FIFA nationality.

No.	Pos.	Nation	Player
3	DF	BUL	Ivo Raykov (Released)
7	FW	MLI	Mamady Sidibé (Released)
8	MF	BUL	Nikolay Dyulgerov (Released)
9	FW	MKD	Hristijan Kirovski (Released)
10	MF	BRA	Marcinho (Released)
15	MF	ENG	Brian Howard (Released)
25	DF	BUL	Angel Granchov (Terminated contract)
41	FW	POR	Bruno Moreira (Released)
42	DF	BUL	Hristo Martinski (Released)
77	MF	BRA	Revson (Released)

== Pre-season and friendlies ==
Win Draw Loss Fixtures

=== Pre-season ===
22 June 2013 Friendly	CSKA	1–1	Svetkavitsa	Etropole
18:30	Dolapchiev 84'	Report	S. Georgiev 65'	Stadium: Chavdar; Attendance: 1,500

25 June 2013 Friendly	CSKA	1–3	Slavia	Sofia
19:00	Dolapchiev 82'; Granchov (yellow card)	Report	M. Vasilev 9'; Aleksandrov 65'; Silva 90'	Stadium: Balgarska Armiya; Attendance: 3,000

10 July 2013 Friendly	Marek	0–2	CSKA	Dupnitsa
18:00		Report	Voynov 34'; Kostadinov 61'	Stadium: Bonchuk

13 July 2013 Friendly	CSKA	0–0	Bansko	Sofia
18:30	Vasilev (yellow card) 38'	Report	Hristov (yellow card)	Stadium: Balgarska Armiya; Attendance: 1,000; Referee: Georgi Andreev

17 July 2013 Friendly	CSKA	1–0	Slivnishki Geroy	Tsarsko selo
18:00	Marcinho 1'	Report		Stadium: Tsarsko selo

=== On-season (autumn) ===
25 July 2013 Friendly	CSKA	2–1	Vitosha Bistritsa	Pancharevo
18:00	Kirovski 21'; Dolapchiev 83'		Bozhov 53' (pen.)	Stadium: Pancharevo

6 August 2013 Friendly	CSKA	1–1	Sportist Svoge	Pancharevo
18:00	Stoichkov 85'		Stoilov 65' (pen.)	Stadium: Pancharevo

14 August 2013 Friendly	Lokomotiv Mezdra	2–1	CSKA	Mezdra
18:30	B. Petkov 32', 53'		Aleksandrov 79'	Stadium: Lokomotiv

21 August 2013 Friendly	Slivnishki Geroy	1–1	CSKA	Slivnitsa
18:30	Ivanov 28'		Sidibé 44'	Stadium: Slivnishki Geroy

8 September 2013 Friendly	CSKA (Bulgaria)	4–0	(North Macedonia) Turnovo	Sofia
16:00	Marcinho 16'; Moreira 22'; Kossoko 29'; Dolapchiev 59'			Stadium: Balgarska Armiya

9 October 2013 Friendly	CSKA	0–0	Bansko	Sofia
16:00	Sidibé (yellow card) 61'	Report	Topuzov (yellow card) 47'	Stadium: Balgarska Armiya

19 November 2013 Friendly	Slivnishki Geroy	0–3	CSKA	Slivnitsa
14:30		Report	Silva 26'; Kirovski 44'; Vasilev 59'	Stadium: Slivnishki Geroy

=== Mid-season ===
20 January 2014 Friendly	CSKA	2–1	Lokomotiv Sofia	Sandanski
14:30	Chochev 20'; Petrov 49'; Chochev (yellow card) 42'	Report	Jovanović 50'	Stadium: Gradski; Attendance: 2,140; Referee: Vladimir Stoyanov

26 January 2014 Friendly	CSKA (Bulgaria)	0–0	(Kazakhstan) Zhetysu	Antalya, Turkey
17:00	Marcinho (yellow card) 44'	Report	Totay (yellow card) 44'	Attendance: 50

29 January 2014 Friendly	CSKA (Bulgaria)	0–1	(Austria) Admira Wacker	Antalya, Turkey
17:00		Report	Sulimani 89'	Attendance: 100

2 February 2014 Friendly	CSKA (Bulgaria)	2–1	(Denmark) Esbjerg	Antalya, Turkey
17:00	Gargorov 7'; Chochev 14'; Herrero (yellow card) 50'	Report	Fellah 67'	Attendance: 200

5 February 2014 Friendly	CSKA (Bulgaria)	2–2	(Hungary) Debrecen	Antalya, Turkey
17:00	Di Vanni 33'; Marcinho 65'; Di Vanni (yellow card) 36'; Chochev (yellow card) 41'; Iliev (yellow card) 55'	Report	Kulcsár 53', 67'; Volaš (penalty missed) 89'; Bouadla (yellow card) 36'	Attendance: 100

8 February 2014 Friendly	CSKA (Bulgaria)	1–0	(Czech Republic) Slavia Prague	Antalya, Turkey
17:00	Kossoko 75'	Report	Ritchie (yellow card) 21' (red card) 35'; Pitak (yellow card) 41'	Attendance: 100

13 February 2014 Friendly	CSKA	3–0	Akademik Svishtov	Sofia
15:00	Karachanakov 63' (pen.); Silva 72'; Ivan Angushev 89'	Report		Stadium: National Sports Academy; Attendance: 300; Referee: Ivaylo Nenkov

15 February 2014 Friendly	Beroe	0–1	CSKA	Stara Zagora
15:00	Elias (penalty missed) 45'; Zafirov (yellow card) 63'; Kostadinov (yellow card) 72'	Report	Petrov 17'; Faug-Porret (yellow card) 22'; Iliev (yellow card) 36'; Gargorov (yellow card) 36'	Stadium: Beroe; Attendance: 4,000; Referee: Iliyan Penchev

20 February 2014 Friendly	Botev Vratsa	2–3	CSKA	Vratsa
15:00	Valeriev 31'; Apostolov 52' (pen.); Apostolov (yellow card) 63'	Report	Marcinho 28'; Marković 58'; Karachanakov 60'	Stadium: Hristo Botev; Attendance: 1,500; Referee: Iliyan Marinov

=== On-season (spring) ===
2 April 2014 Friendly	Lokomotiv Mezdra	0–5	CSKA	Mezdra
16:30		Report	Dolapchiev 31'; Di Vanni 35'; Galchev 55'; Karachanakov 63'; Marcinho 71'	Stadium: Lokomotiv; Attendance: 500

4 April 2014 Friendly	Lokomotiv Sofia	1–3	CSKA	Sofia
16:00	Yakassongo 90'	Report	Chochev 7'; V. Iliev 14'; Petrov 41'	Stadium: Lokomotiv; Attendance: 150; Referee: Tihomir Aleksov

== Competitions ==
=== A Group ===
==== First phase ====
===== Table =====
Pos	Team	Pld	W	D	L	GF	GA	GD	Pts	Qualification
1	Ludogorets Razgrad	26	18	4	4	57	14	+43	58	Qualification for championship group
2	Litex Lovech	26	17	6	3	59	26	+33	57	Qualification for championship group
3	CSKA Sofia	26	15	6	5	44	14	+30	51	Qualification for championship group
4	Botev Plovdiv	26	13	7	6	45	21	+24	46	Qualification for championship group
5	Lokomotiv Plovdiv	26	14	3	9	43	31	+12	45	Qualification for championship group

Source: A PFG (in Bulgarian)
Rules for classification: 1st points; 2nd head-to-head points; 3rd head-to-head goal difference; 4th head-to-head goals scored; 5th head-to-head away goals scored; 6th season goal difference; 7th season goals scored; 8th "sportsmanship" (R & Y cards); 9th draw

===== Results summary =====
Overall								Home						Away					
Pld	W	D	L	GF	GA	GD	Pts	W	D	L	GF	GA	GD	W	D	L	GF	GA	GD
26	15	6	5	44	14	+30	51	9	3	1	29	2	+27	6	3	4	15	12	+3

Last updated: 9 March 2014.
Source: Soccerway

===== Results by round =====
Round	1	2	3	4	5	6	7	8	9	10	11	12	13	14	15	16	17	18	19	20	21	22	23	24	25	26
Ground	H	A	H	A	H	A	H	A	H	A	H	A	H	A	H	A	H	A	H	A	H	A	H	A	H	A
Result	D	D	D	L	W	D	D	W	W	W	W	W	W	L	W	L	L	W	W	L	W	D	W	W	W	W
Position	8	9	9	12	7	6	9	7	5	4	4	4	3	4	3	3	4	3	3	5	5	6	4	3	3	3

Source: See Results
A = Away; H = Home; W = Win; D = Draw; L = Loss

===== Fixtures and results =====
20 July 2013 1	CSKA	0–0	Lokomotiv Plovdiv	Sofia
20:00	Milisavljević (yellow card) 68'; Chochev (yellow card) 74'; Vasilev (yellow card) 78'; Mendy (yellow card) 89'	Report	V. Georgiev (yellow card) 27'; Diego (yellow card) 45+2' do Carmo (yellow card) 71'	Stadium: Balgarska Armiya; Attendance: 8,380; Referee: Nikola Popov (Sofia)

29 July 2013 2	Beroe	1–1	CSKA	Stara Zagora
21:00	Hristov 64'; Krumov (yellow card) 27'	Report	Dolapchiev 83'; Revson (yellow card) 71'; Chochev (yellow card) 90+3'	Stadium: Beroe; Attendance: 7,940; Referee: Tsvetan Krastev (Varna)

3 August 2013 3	CSKA	0–0	Cherno More	Sofia
20:00	V. Iliev (yellow card) 35'	Report	Okoro (yellow card) 26'; Georgiev (yellow card) 52'; Raykov (yellow card) 74'; Kitanov (yellow card) 82'; Stanchev (yellow card) 90+1'	Stadium: Balgarska Armiya; Attendance: 5,700; Referee: Georgi Yordanov (Gabrovo)

10 August 2013 4	Ludogorets	3–0	CSKA	Razgrad
21:00	Moți 41'; Bezjak 62'; Marcelinho 73'	Report	Dyulgerov (yellow card) 3'	Stadium: Ludogorets Arena; Attendance: 5,490; Referee: Ivaylo Stoyanov (Petrich)

17 August 2013 5	CSKA	4–0	Neftochimic	Sofia
21:00	Marcinho 15'; Vasilev 18'; Gargorov 37'; Dolapchiev 79'	Report	P. Dimitrov (yellow card) 73'	Stadium: Balgarska Armiya; Attendance: 2,220; Referee: Stefan Apostolov (Simitli)

24 August 2013 6	Lokomotiv Sofia	1–1	CSKA	Sofia
18:00	Tom 16'; Trifonov (yellow card) 18'; Tom (yellow card) 39'; Matutu (yellow card) 51'; Ranđelović (yellow card) 58'; Dimitrov (yellow card) 84'	Report	V. Iliev 68'; Marcinho (yellow card) 17'; Vasilev (yellow card) 23' (red card) 27'; Kirovski (yellow card) 41'; Kossoko (yellow card) 75'; Mendy (yellow card) 84'	Stadium: Lokomotiv; Attendance: 1,080; Referee: Vladimir Valkov (Plovdiv)

1 September 2013 7	CSKA	0–0	Botev	Sofia
20:00	Mendy (yellow card) 54' (yellow-red card) 90+3'	Report		Stadium: Balgarska Armiya; Attendance: 4,930; Referee: Stanislav Todorov (Shumen)

13 September 2013 8	Pirin	0–1	CSKA	Gotse Delchev
16:15	Kirov (yellow card) 47'	Report	Marcinho 49' (pen.); Marcinho (yellow card) 22'; Howard (yellow card) 57'; V. Iliev (yellow card) 74'; Černý (yellow card) 90+3'	Stadium: Gradski; Attendance: 1,100; Referee: Vihren Manev (Sofia)

23 September 2013 9	CSKA	1–0	Litex	Sofia
20:00	Chochev 11'; Faug-Porret (yellow card) 26'; Dyulgerov (yellow card) 78'	Report	Vajushi (yellow card) 38'; Popov (yellow card) 81'; Slavchev (yellow card) 83'; Bodurov (yellow card) 89'	Stadium: Balgarska Armiya; Attendance: 5,540; Referee: Ivaylo Stoyanov (Petrich)

26 September 2013 10	Lyubimets	0–3	CSKA	Lyubimets
16:30	Velichkov (red card) 39'	Report	Chochev 23'; Marcinho 40'; Kirovski 65'; Kirovski (yellow card) 73'	Stadium: Gradski; Attendance: 830; Referee: Atanas Dimitrov (Sliven)

29 September 2013 11	CSKA	3–0	Chernomorets	Sofia
18:00	V. Iliev 4'; Gargorov 32'; Yanchev 61'	Report	Fonseca (yellow card) 27'; Trajanov (yellow card) 57' (yellow-red card) 76'; Chico (yellow card) 74'	Stadium: Balgarska Armiya; Attendance: 1,960; Referee: Georgi Dimitrov (Sofia)

5 October 2013 12	Slavia	0–1	CSKA	Sofia
15:00	Atanasov (yellow card) 32'; Zhelev (yellow card) 71'; Yanev (yellow card) 81'	Report	Gargorov 48'; A. Popov (yellow card) 34'; V. Iliev (yellow card) 38'; Howard (yellow card) 79'; Marcinho (yellow card) 82'; Černý (yellow card) 90+5'	Stadium: Ovcha Kupel; Attendance: 1,130; Referee: Georgi Kabakov (Plovdiv)

19 October 2013 13	CSKA	3–0	Levski	Sofia
16:00	Milisavljević 31'; A. Popov 35'; Gargorov 37'; Sidibé (yellow card) 39'; Howard (yellow card) 67'; V. Iliev (yellow card) 76'	Report	Mulder (yellow card) 34'; Pérez (yellow card) 39'; Pinto (yellow card) 54'; Gadzhev (yellow card) 59'	Stadium: Vasil Levski; Attendance: 13,950; Referee: Georgi Yordanov (Gabrovo)

26 October 2013 14	Lokomotiv Plovdiv	1–0	CSKA	Plovdiv
18:00	Gadi 1'; Kiki (yellow card) 28'; Diego (yellow card) 88'; Iliadis (yellow card) 89'; N'Diaye (yellow card) 90+4'	Report	Faug-Porret (yellow card) 16'; Chochev (yellow card) 32'; V. Iliev (yellow card) 90+6'	Stadium: Lauta; Attendance: 4,110; Referee: Nikola Popov (Sofia)

31 October 2013 15	CSKA	1–0	Beroe	Sofia
18:00	Moreira 28'; Marcinho (yellow card) 20'; Faug-Porret (yellow card) 36'; Mendy (yellow card) 70'; Milisavljević (yellow card) 75'	Report	Andonov (yellow card) 33'; Djoman (yellow card) 49'; Penev (yellow card) 88'	Stadium: Balgarska Armiya; Attendance: 2,940; Referee: Radan Miryanov (Varna)

3 November 2013 16	Cherno More	2–1	CSKA	Varna
14:30	Raykov 33'; Bacari 36' (pen.); Mihaylov (yellow card) 90+1'	Report	Gargorov 22'; V. Iliev (yellow card) 35'; Sidibé (yellow card) 52'; Mendy (yellow card) 62'; A. Popov (yellow card) 84'	Stadium: Ticha; Attendance: 6,830; Referee: Stanislav Todorov (Shumen)

10 November 2013 17	CSKA	0–2	Ludogorets	Sofia
17:30	Faug-Porret (yellow card) 63'	Report	Aleksandrov 28'; Misidjan 49'	Stadium: Balgarska Armiya; Attendance: 9,450; Referee: Georgi Yordanov (Gabrovo)

25 November 2013 18	Neftochimic	1–3	CSKA	Sliven
14:30	Tsonkov 18'; Petkov (yellow card) 47'; Manev (yellow card) 49'	Report	Petrov 27'; Gargorov 80'; V. Iliev 84'; Howard (yellow card) 14'; Gargorov (yellow card) 37'; V. Iliev (yellow card) 77'	Stadium: Hadzhi Dimitar; Attendance: 970; Referee: Angel Bayaltsaliev (Sofia)

30 November 2013 19	CSKA	5–0	Lokomotiv Sofia	Sofia
15:15	Petrov 12', 41'; Chochev 35'; Marcinho 49'; Gargorov 73'; Kossoko (yellow card) 68'	Report	Jovanović (yellow card) 14'; Pisarov (yellow card) 70'	Stadium: Balgarska Armiya; Attendance: 740; Referee: Vihren Manev (Sofia)

5 December 2013 20	Botev	2–1	CSKA	Plovdiv
14:00	Tsvetkov 12' (pen.); Ognyanov 70'; Grnčarov (yellow card) 74'	Report	Chochev 47'; V. Iliev (yellow card) 10'; Faug-Porret (yellow card) 12'; Černý (yellow card) 70'	Stadium: Hristo Botev; Attendance: 6,170; Referee: Ivaylov Stoyanov (Petrich)

8 December 2013 21	CSKA	2–0	Pirin	Sofia
16:00	Sidibé 55'; Chochev 70'; Vasilev (yellow card) 31'	Report	Bliznakov (yellow card) 18'; Kirov (yellow card) 27'	Stadium: Balgarska Armiya; Attendance: 440; Referee: Martin Aleksandrov (Sofia)

11 December 2013 22	Litex	0–0	CSKA	Lovech
16:30	Milanov (yellow card) 79'; Bozhikov (yellow card) 90+2'	Report	Yanchev (yellow card) 12'; A. Popov (yellow card) 24'; Marcinho (yellow card) 75'; Milisavljević (yellow card) 90+2'	Stadium: Gradski; Attendance: 1,180; Referee: Vihren Manev (Sofia)

14 December 2013 23	CSKA	7–0	Lyubimets	Sofia
17:15	Kossoko 6'; Karachanakov 14', 53'; Gargorov 45+1'; Vasilev 51'; Dolapchiev 61'; Chochev 67'; Karachanakov (yellow card) 3'	Report	Orlinov (yellow card) 44'; Dimitrov (yellow card) 80'	Stadium: Balgarska Armiya; Attendance: 380; Referee: Stefan Apostolov (Simitli)

24 February 2014 24	Chernomorets	1–2	CSKA	Burgas
17:15	Fonseca 79'; Fonseca (yellow card) 68'; Chico (yellow card) 82'; Shokolarov (yellow card) 90+4'	Report	Silva 72'; V. Iliev 90'; Vasilev (yellow card) 21'; Faug-Porret (yellow card) 65'; Silva (yellow card) 77'	Stadium: Lazur; Attendance: 1,560; Referee: Nikola Popov (Sofia)

1 March 2014 25	CSKA	3–0	Slavia	Sofia
16:15	Milisavljević 63'; Kossoko 79'; Silva 82'	Report	Panov (yellow card) 39' (red card) 73'; Dimitrov (yellow card) 52'	Stadium: Balgarska Armiya; Attendance: 3,910; Referee: Georgi Dimitrov (Sofia)

8 March 2014 26	Levski	0–1	CSKA	Sofia
16:15	Touré (yellow card) 8' (yellow-red card) 90+5'; Bojinov (yellow card) 45'; Belaïd (yellow card) 50'; Starokin (yellow card) 53'; Angelov (yellow card) 58' (yellow-red card) 68'; Gadzhev (yellow card) 72' (red card) 90+5'; Makriev (yellow card) 80'	Report	Gargorov 69' (pen.); Galchev (yellow card) 13' (yellow-red card) 29'; V. Iliev (yellow card) 65'; M'Bolhi (yellow card) 72' (red card) 90+5'; Milisavljević (yellow card) 86'; Faug-Porret (yellow card) 89'; A. Popov (yellow card) 90+5'; Kossoko (red card) 90+5'	Stadium: Vasil Levski; Attendance: 9,920; Referee: Georgi Kabakov (Plovdiv)

==== Championship group ====
===== Table =====
Pos	Team	Pld	W	D	L	GF	GA	GD	Pts	Qualification
1	Ludogorets Razgrad (C)	38	25	9	4	74	20	+54	84	Qualification for Champions League second qualifying round
2	CSKA Sofia	38	21	9	8	56	20	+36	72 (Note: CSKA Sofia ahead of Litex Lovech on head-to-head points; CSKA Sofia: 10 pts, Litex Lovech: 1 pts.)	Qualification for Europa League second qualifying round
3	Litex Lovech	38	21	9	8	74	37	+37	72	Qualification for Europa League first qualifying round
4	Botev Plovdiv	38	18	11	9	57	32	+25	65	Qualification for Europa League first qualifying round
5	Levski Sofia	38	19	5	14	59	39	+20	62	

Source: A PFG (in Bulgarian)
Rules for classification: 1st points; 2nd head-to-head points; 3rd head-to-head goal difference; 4th head-to-head goals scored; 5th head-to-head away goals scored; 6th season goal difference; 7th season goals scored; 8th "sportsmanship" (R & Y cards); 9th draw
(C) Champions

===== Results summary =====
Overall								Home						Away					
Pld	W	D	L	GF	GA	GD	Pts	W	D	L	GF	GA	GD	W	D	L	GF	GA	GD
12	6	3	3	12	6	+6	21	4	1	1	8	2	+6	2	2	2	4	4	0

Last updated: 17 May 2014.
Source: Soccerway

===== Results by round =====
Round	1	2	3	4	5	6	7	8	9	10	11	12	13	14
Ground	H	A	H	A	-	H	A	A	H	A	H	-	A	H
Result	W	D	L	W	-	W	L	W	W	L	W	-	D	D
Position	3	3	3	2	2	2	3	3	3	2	2	2	3	2

Source: See Results
A = Away; H = Home; W = Win; D = Draw; L = Loss

===== Fixtures and results =====
15 March 2014 27	CSKA	1–0	Levski	Sofia
16:15	Krachunov 90+3'; Yanchev (yellow card) 33'; Faug-Porret (yellow card) 79'	Report	Touré (yellow card) 36'; Cristóvão Ramos (yellow card) 68'; Krumov (yellow card) 85'	Stadium: Vasil Levski; Attendance: 9,920; Referee: Georgi Yordanov (Gabrovo)

23 March 2014 28	Cherno More	0–0	CSKA	Varna
15:45	Bacari (penalty missed) 74'; Bacari (yellow card) 15'; Bozhilov (yellow card) 22'; Kokonov (yellow card) 77'; Edenilson (yellow card) 87'	Report	Krachunov (yellow card) 63'; Mendy (yellow card) 78'	Stadium: Ticha; Attendance: 7,350; Referee: Aleksandar Kostadinov (Sofia)

26 March 2014 29	CSKA	0–1	Ludogorets	Sofia
19:30	V. Iliev (yellow card) 23'; Stoyanov (yellow card) 49'; Gargorov (yellow card) 61'; Yanchev (yellow card) 82'; Di Vanni (yellow card) 90+1'	Report	Abalo 77'; Terziev (yellow card) 27'; Minev (yellow card) 37'; Hernández (yellow card) 87'; Abalo (yellow card) 89'	Stadium: Balgarska Armiya; Attendance: 5,900; Referee: Georgi Yordanov (Gabrovo)

29 March 2014 30	Litex	0–1	CSKA	Lovech
16:15	Vajushi (yellow card) 31'; Asprilla (yellow card) 60'; Nikolov (yellow card) 78'; Goranov (yellow card) 87'	Report	Milisavljević 48'; V. Iliev (yellow card) 13'; Milisavljević (yellow card) 71'; Gargorov (yellow card) 86'; Silva (yellow card) 90+3'	Stadium: Gradski; Attendance: 2,790; Referee: Ivaylo Stoyanov (Petrich)

31	CSKA	bye

10 April 2014 32	CSKA	2–0	Botev	Sofia
19:30	Kossoko 50'; Stoyanov 90+3'; Sunny (yellow card) 55'; Mendy (yellow card) 65'; Plamen Krachunov (yellow card) 90+3'	Report	Vander (yellow card) 53'; Filipov (yellow card) 69'; Benga (yellow card) 80'; Doré (yellow card) 86'	Stadium: Balgarska Armiya; Attendance: 2,600; Referee: Nikola Popov (Sofia)

13 April 2014 33	Lokomotiv Plovdiv	2–0	CSKA	Plovdiv
19:30	Lazarov 37'; Kamburov 51' (pen.); Tunchev (yellow card) 29'; Namouchi (yellow card) 42'; Yoshev (yellow card) 59'; Akalski (yellow card) 76'; Lazarov (yellow card) 78'	Report	M'Bolhi (yellow card) 50'; Sunny (yellow card) 71'	Stadium: Lauta; Attendance: 1,460; Referee: Tasko Taskov (Sofia)

21 April 2014 34	Levski	1–3	CSKA	Sofia
16:00	R. Tsonev 81'; Belaïd (yellow card) 53'; R. Tsonev (yellow card) 78'; Bojinov (yellow card) 84'; Starokin (yellow card) 84'; Čmovš (yellow card) 89'; Nunes (yellow card) 90+5'	Report	Kossoko 58'; Stoyanov 86'; Marković 90+6'; Krachunov (yellow card) 25'; Yanchev (yellow card) 26'; Silva (yellow card) 37'; Marković (yellow card) 90+7'	Stadium: Vasil Levski; Attendance: 8,650; Referee: Ivaylo Stoyanov (Petrich)

27 April 2014 35	CSKA	2–0	Cherno More	Sofia
17:00	Stoyanov 36'; Chochev 38'; Faug-Porret (yellow card) 32' (yellow-red card) 85'	Report		Stadium: Balgarska Armiya; Attendance: 1,040; Referee: Georgi Dimitrov (Sofia)

30 April 2014 36	Ludogorets	1–0	CSKA	Razgrad
19:15	Lumu 89'; Minev (yellow card) 45'; Zlatinski (yellow card) 46'; Moți (red card) 84'	Report	Silva (yellow card) 45+1'; Chochev (yellow card) 46'; Gargorov (yellow card) 68'; Mendy (yellow card) 88'; A. Popov (red card) 90+1'	Stadium: Ludogorets Arena; Attendance: 6,000; Referee: Ivaylo Stoyanov (Petrich)

4 May 2014 37	CSKA	2–0	Litex	Sofia
19:30	Vasilev 14'; Kossoko 61'; Sunny (yellow card) 25'; Faug-Porret (yellow card) 28'	Report	Bozhikov (yellow card) 39'; Tom (red card) 74'	Stadium: Balgarska Armiya; Attendance: 750; Referee: Georgi Yordanov (Gabrovo)

38	CSKA	bye

11 May 2014 39	Botev	0–0	CSKA	Plovdiv
18:00	Luchin (yellow card) 55'; Doré (yellow card) 73'	Report	Vasilev (yellow card) 32'; Chochev (yellow card) 45+2'	Stadium: Botev 1912 Football Complex; Attendance: 2,900; Referee: Ivan Kirilov (Varna)

18 May 2014 40	CSKA	1–1	Lokomotiv Plovdiv	Sofia
20:00	Silva 70'; Krachunov (yellow card) 79'; Mendy (yellow card) 90+4'	Report	Delev 29'; Namouchi (yellow card) 30'; Gospodinov (yellow card) 32'	Stadium: Balgarska Armiya; Attendance: 1,940; Referee: Hristo Ristoskov (Sandanski)

=== Bulgarian Cup ===
17 September 2013 Round 1 Leg 1	CSKA	6–2	Haskovo	Sofia
17:30	Vasilev 7'; Marcinho 23' (pen.), 50'; Dolapchiev 30'; Sidibé 61'; Chochev 83'	Report	Uzunov 58'; Aleksiev 63'	Stadium: Balgarska Armiya; Attendance: 450; Referee: Tasko Taskov (Sofia)

12 October 2013 Round 1 Leg 2	Haskovo	1–1 (3–7 agg.)	CSKA	Haskovo
14:00	Lozev 50'; Chanev (yellow card) 25'	Report	Kirovski 63'; Howard (yellow card) 45+1'	Stadium: Gradski; Attendance: 3,010; Referee: Stefan Apostolov (Blagoevgrad)

16 November 2013 Round 2 Leg 1	CSKA	0–0	Levski	Sofia
15:15	Popov (yellow card) 32'; Sidibé (yellow card) 78'	Report	Ivanov (yellow card) 36'; Bru (yellow card) 75'	Stadium: Vasil Levski; Attendance: 11,670; Referee: Tsvetan Krastev (Varna)

19 December 2013 Round 2 Leg 2	Levski	0–0 (a.e.t.) (0–0 agg.) (7–6 p)	CSKA	Sofia
16:00	Makriev (yellow card) 40'; Angelov (yellow card) 68'; Touré (yellow card) 77'; Mulder (yellow card) 119'	Report	Chochev (yellow card) 15'; Mendy (yellow card) 40'; Iliev (yellow card) 45'; Sidibé (yellow card) 97'; Karachanakov (yellow card) 119'	Stadium: Vasil Levski; Attendance: 8,540; Referee: Tsvetan Krastev (Varna)
	Penalties
	Rodrigues (penalty scored); Makriev (penalty scored); Touré (penalty missed); Angelov (penalty scored); Vutov (penalty scored); Dimov (penalty scored); Bru (penalty missed); Pérez (penalty scored); Mulder (penalty scored)		(penalty missed) Gargorov; (penalty scored) Karachanakov; (penalty scored) Yanchev; (penalty scored) Popov; (penalty scored) Chochev; (penalty scored) Vasilev; (penalty missed) Iliev; (penalty scored) Mendy; (penalty missed) Sidibé

== See also ==
- PFC CSKA Sofia
