= 2013–14 PFC Ludogorets Razgrad season =

Ludogorets Razgrad
2013–14 season
- Chairman: Aleksandar Aleksandrov
- Manager: Stoycho Stoev
- A Group: 1st (champions)
- Bulgarian Cup: Winners
- Supercup: Runners-Up
- Champions League: Playoff Round vs Basel
- Europa League: Round of 16 vs Valencia
- Top goalscorer: League: Roman Bezjak (13); All: Roman Bezjak (20)
- Highest home attendance: 41,085 vs Valencia; 13 March 2014
- Lowest home attendance: 650 vs Lokomotiv Sofia; 15 December 2013
- Average home league attendance: 6,061
Home colours	Away colours

The 2013–14 season is Ludogorets Razgrad's second season in A Football Group, of which they are defending Champions. They will also take part in the Bulgarian Cup, SuperCup and enter the UEFA Champions League at the second qualifying round stage.

== Squad ==
As of match played 18 May 2014

No.	Name	Nationality	Position	Date of birth (age)	Signed from	Signed in	Contract ends	Apps.	Goals
Goalkeepers
21	Vladislav Stoyanov	(Bulgaria)	GK	8 June 1987 (aged 26)	Sheriff Tiraspol	2013		61	0
30	Georgi Argilashki	(Bulgaria)	GK	13 June 1991 (aged 22)	Brestnik 1948	2011		2	0
91	Ivan Čvorović	(Bulgaria)	GK	15 June 1985 (aged 28)	Minyor Pernik	2012		27	0
Defenders
4	Tero Mäntylä	(Finland)	DF	18 April 1991 (aged 23)	Inter Turku	2012		36	1
5	Alexandre Barthe	(France)	DF	5 March 1986 (aged 28)	Litex Lovech	2011		79	7
15	Aleksandar Aleksandrov	(Bulgaria)	DF	13 April 1986 (aged 28)	Cherno More Varna	2014		10	0
20	Choco	(Brazil)	DF	18 January 1990 (aged 24)	Santos	2011		71	2
25	Yordan Minev	(Bulgaria)	DF	14 October 1980 (aged 33)	Botev Plovdiv	2011		100	0
27	Cosmin Moți	(Romania)	DF	3 December 1984 (aged 29)	Dinamo București	2012		75	7
55	Georgi Terziev	(Bulgaria)	DF	18 April 1992 (aged 22)	Chernomorets Burgas	2013		19	0
77	Vitinha	(Portugal)	DF	11 February 1986 (aged 28)	Concordia Chiajna	2012		32	0
80	Júnior Caiçara	(Brazil)	DF	27 April 1989 (aged 25)	Santo André	2012		86	1
Midfielders
7	Mihail Aleksandrov	(Bulgaria)	MF	11 June 1989 (aged 24)	Akademik Sofia	2010		107	21
8	Espinho	(Portugal)	MF	18 August 1985 (aged 28)	Moreirense	2013		53	2
10	Sebastián Hernández	(Colombia)	MF	2 October 1986 (aged 27)	Independiente Medellín	2013		28	6
14	Mitchell Burgzorg	(Netherlands)	MF	25 July 1987 (aged 26)	Almere City	2012		28	2
16	Kristiyan Kitov	(Bulgaria)	MF	14 October 1996 (aged 17)	CSKA Sofia	2012		3	0
17	Dani Abalo	(Spain)	MF	29 September 1987 (aged 26)	Celta Vigo	2013		42	10
18	Svetoslav Dyakov	(Bulgaria)	MF	31 May 1984 (aged 29)	Lokomotiv Sofia	2012		106	8
23	Hristo Zlatinski	(Bulgaria)	MF	22 January 1985 (aged 29)	Lokomotiv Plovdiv	2013		51	12
84	Marcelinho	(Brazil)	MF	24 August 1984 (aged 29)	Bragantino	2011		115	34
Forwards
9	Roman Bezjak	(Slovenia)	FW	21 February 1989 (aged 25)	Celje	2012		68	25
11	Juninho Quixadá	(Brazil)	FW	12 December 1985 (aged 28)	Bragantino	2011		78	18
19	Dimo Bakalov	(Bulgaria)	FW	19 December 1988 (aged 25)	Sliven	2011		43	6
93	Virgil Misidjan	(Netherlands)	FW	24 July 1993 (aged 20)	Willem II	2013		43	12
95	Jeroen Lumu	(Netherlands)	FW	27 May 1995 (aged 18)	Willem II	2013		16	2
99	Michel Platini	(Brazil)	FW	8 September 1983 (aged 30)	CSKA Sofia	2013		23	4
Players away on loan
3	Teynur Marem	(Bulgaria)	DF	24 September 1994 (aged 19)	Sliven 2000	2012		0	0
Players who left during the season
6	Georgi Kostadinov	(Bulgaria)	MF	7 September 1990 (aged 23)	Pomorie	2012		13	2
22	Miroslav Ivanov	(Bulgaria)	MF	9 November 1991 (aged 22)	Montana	2011		77	12
73	Ivan Stoyanov	(Bulgaria)	MF	24 July 1983 (aged 30)	Alania Vladikavkaz	2011		90	30

== Transfers ==
=== Summer ===
In: Note: Flags indicate national team as defined under FIFA eligibility rules; some limited exceptions apply. Players may hold more than one non-FIFA nationality.

No.	Pos.	Nation	Player
8	MF	POR	Fábio Espinho (from (Portugal) Moreirense)
17	MF	ESP	Dani Abalo (from (Spain) Celta Vigo)
23	MF	BUL	Hristo Zlatinski (from Lokomotiv Plovdiv)
99	FW	BRA	Michel Platini (from CSKA Sofia)

Out: Note: Flags indicate national team as defined under FIFA eligibility rules; some limited exceptions apply. Players may hold more than one non-FIFA nationality.

No.	Pos.	Nation	Player
1	GK	SRB	Uroš Golubović (end of contract)
3	DF	BUL	Teynur Marem (on loan to Haskovo)
6	MF	BUL	Georgi Kostadinov (to Beroe Stara Zagora)
8	MF	BUL	Stanislav Genchev (to Litex Lovech)
15	MF	SRB	Nemanja Milisavljević (to CSKA Sofia)
22	MF	BUL	Miroslav Ivanov (to Levski Sofia)
23	MF	BUL	Emil Gargorov (to CSKA Sofia)
33	DF	SVK	Ľubomír Guldan (to (Poland) Zagłębie Lubin)

=== Winter ===
In: Note: Flags indicate national team as defined under FIFA eligibility rules; some limited exceptions apply. Players may hold more than one non-FIFA nationality.

No.	Pos.	Nation	Player
15	DF	BUL	Aleksandar Aleksandrov (from Cherno More)
95	MF	NED	Jeroen Lumu (from (Netherlands) Willem II)

Out: Note: Flags indicate national team as defined under FIFA eligibility rules; some limited exceptions apply. Players may hold more than one non-FIFA nationality.

No.	Pos.	Nation	Player
73	MF	BUL	Ivan Stoyanov (to CSKA Sofia)

== Competitions ==
=== Supercup ===
10 July 2013	Ludogorets Razgrad	1–1 (3–5 p)	Beroe Stara Zagora	Sofia
20:30 EEST	Dyakov 45+2'; M. Ivanov (yellow card) 36'; Moți (yellow card) 43'; Dyakov (yellow card) 50' (yellow-red card) 59'; Marcelinho (yellow card) 53'; V. Stoyanov (yellow card) 59'; Mäntylä (yellow card) 78'	Report	Hristov 27'; Iliev (yellow card) 17'; Caiado (yellow card) 37'; Stoychev (yellow card) 51' (yellow-red card) 65'; Djoman (yellow card) 61'	Stadium: Vasil Levski; Attendance: 1,200; Referee: Georgi Yordanov
	Penalties
	Platini (penalty scored); Zlatinski (penalty scored); Marcelinho (penalty missed); I. Stoyanov (penalty scored)		Andonov (penalty scored); I. Ivanov (penalty scored); Hristov (penalty scored); Krumov (penalty scored); Elias (penalty scored)

=== A PFG ===
==== First phase ====
===== Table =====
Pos	Team	Pld	W	D	L	GF	GA	GD	Pts	Qualification
1	Ludogorets Razgrad	26	18	4	4	57	14	+43	58	Qualification for championship group
2	Litex Lovech	26	17	6	3	59	26	+33	57	Qualification for championship group
3	CSKA Sofia	26	15	6	5	44	14	+30	51	Qualification for championship group
4	Botev Plovdiv	26	13	7	6	45	21	+24	46	Qualification for championship group
5	Lokomotiv Plovdiv	26	14	3	9	43	31	+12	45	Qualification for championship group

Source: A PFG (in Bulgarian)
Rules for classification: 1st points; 2nd head-to-head points; 3rd head-to-head goal difference; 4th head-to-head goals scored; 5th head-to-head away goals scored; 6th season goal difference; 7th season goals scored; 8th "sportsmanship" (R & Y cards); 9th draw

===== Results summary =====
Overall								Home						Away					
Pld	W	D	L	GF	GA	GD	Pts	W	D	L	GF	GA	GD	W	D	L	GF	GA	GD
26	18	4	4	57	14	+43	58	9	2	2	35	7	+28	9	2	2	22	7	+15

Last updated: 2 June 2014.
Source: Soccerway

===== Results by round =====
Round	1	2	3	4	5	6	7	8	9	10	11	12	13	14	15	16	17	18	19	20	21	22	23	24	25	26
Ground	A	H	A	H	A	H	A	A	H	A	H	A	H	H	A	H	A	H	A	H	H	H	A	A	H	A
Result	L	W	W	W	W	W	L	W	W	W	D	W	L	W	W	W	W	W	W	D	L	W	W	D	W	D
Position	11	6	6	3	1	1	2	1	1	1	1	1	2	2	2	1	1	1	1	1	1	1	1	1	1	1

Source: bulgarian-football.com
A = Away; H = Home; W = Win; D = Draw; L = Loss

===== Results =====
20 July 2013 1	Lyubimets 2007	1–0	Ludogorets Razgrad	Lyubimets
18:00 EEST	Aess 10'	Report	Moți (red card) 72'	Stadium: Gradski Stadium; Attendance: 1,400; Referee: Georgi Dimitrov

27 July 2013 2	Ludogorets Razgrad	1–0	Chernomorets Burgas	Razgrad
20:00 EEST	Bezjak 57'	Report		Stadium: Ludogorets Arena; Attendance: 950; Referee: Vladimir Valkov

3 August 2013 3	Slavia Sofia	0–3	Ludogorets Razgrad	Sofia
18:00 EEST		Report	Hernández 10'; Aleksandrov 56'; Juninho 84'	Stadium: Ovcha Kupel Stadium; Attendance: 100; Referee: Nikola Popov

10 August 2013 4	Ludogorets Razgrad	3–0	CSKA Sofia	Razgrad
21:00 EEST	Moți 41'; Bezjak 62'; Marcelinho 73'	Report		Stadium: Ludogorets Arena; Attendance: 5,500; Referee: Ivaylo Stoyanov

17 August 2013 5	Lokomotiv Plovdiv	0–1	Ludogorets Razgrad	Plovdiv
19:00 EEST		Report	Platini 44'	Stadium: Lokomotiv Stadium; Attendance: 3,500; Referee: Georgi Yordanov

24 August 2013 6	Ludogorets Razgrad	3–0	Beroe	Razgrad
20:00 EEST	Marcelinho 4', 64'; Dyakov 88' (pen.)	Report		Stadium: Ludogorets Arena; Attendance: 2,400; Referee: Stanislav Stavrov

31 August 2013 7	Cherno More	3–1	Ludogorets Razgrad	Varna
EEST	Bozhilov 21', 54'; Georgiev 71'	Report	Espinho 80'	Stadium: Ticha Stadium; Attendance: 2,800; Referee: Vihren Manev

15 September 2013 8	Levski Sofia	0–2	Ludogorets Razgrad	Sofia
20:00 EEST		Report	Espinho 15'; Misidjan 42'	Stadium: Georgi Asparuhov Stadium; Attendance: 6,300; Referee: Ivaylo Stoyanov

22 September 2013 9	Ludogorets Razgrad	4–0	Neftochimic Burgas	Razgrad
18:00 EEST	Juninho 6', 18'; Hernández 56'; Platini 88'	Report		Stadium: Ludogorets Arena; Attendance: 800; Referee: Kalin Lyudmilov

25 September 2013 10	Lokomotiv Sofia	1–2	Ludogorets Razgrad	Sofia
17:00 EEST	Trifonov 37'	Report	Aleksandrov 24'; Marcelinho 29'	Stadium: Lokomotiv Stadium; Attendance: 390; Referee: Nikola Popov

28 September 2013 11	Ludogorets Razgrad	0–0	Botev Plovdiv	Razgrad
20:30 EEST		Report		Stadium: Ludogorets Arena; Attendance: 3,200; Referee: Nikolay Yordanov

6 October 2013 12	Pirin Gotse Delchev	0–3	Ludogorets Razgrad	Gotse Delchev
16:00 EEST		Report	Zlatinski 43' (pen.); Abalo 45+3'; Marcelinho 86'	Stadium: Gradski Stadium; Attendance: 550; Referee: Stanislav Todorov

20 October 2013 13	Ludogorets Razgrad	2–4	Litex Lovech	Razgrad
18:00 EEST	Misidjan 51'; Dyakov 86' (pen.); Juninho (yellow card) 87' (red card) 89'	Report	Manolov 18'; Bodurov 22' (red card) 89'; Gjasula 31' (pen.); Slavchev 80'	Stadium: Ludogorets Arena; Attendance: 3,500; Referee: Ivaylo Stoyanov

27 October 2013 14	Ludogorets Razgrad	5–1	Lyubimets 2007	Razgrad
18:00 EEST	Hernández 48'; Bezjak 51', 56', 84', 88'	Report	Orlinov 80'	Stadium: Ludogorets Arena; Attendance: 800; Referee: Stefan Pavlov

30 October 2013 15	Chernomorets Burgas	0–2	Ludogorets Razgrad	Burgas
18:00 EET		Report	Bezjak 41'; Misidjan 60'	Stadium: Lazur Stadium; Attendance: 800; Referee: Georgi Yordanov

2 November 2013 16	Ludogorets Razgrad	4–0	Slavia Sofia	Razgrad
18:00 EET	Bezjak 4', 7'; Marcelinho 16'; Abalo 71'	Report		Stadium: Ludogorets Arena; Attendance: 1,200; Referee: Kalin Lyudmilov

10 November 2013 17	CSKA Sofia	0–2	Ludogorets Razgrad	Sofia
17:30 EET		Report	Aleksandrov 28'; Misidjan 49'	Stadium: Balgarska Armia Stadium; Attendance: 9,500; Referee: Georgie Yordanov

23 November 2013 18	Ludogorets Razgrad	3–0	Lokomotiv Plovdiv	Razgrad
18:00 EEST	Misidjan 24'; Aleksandrov 42'; Bezjak 77'	Report		Stadium: Ludogorets Arena; Attendance: 1,900; Referee: Stanislav Stavrov

1 December 2013 19	Beroe	0–1	Ludogorets Razgrad	Stara Zagora
16:00 EEST		Report	Misidjan 23'	Stadium: Beroe Stadium; Attendance: 2,400; Referee: Nikolay Yordanov

4 December 2013 20	Ludogorets Razgrad	1–1	Cherno More	Razgrad
14:00 EEST	Moți 73'	Report	Bacari 35'	Stadium: Ludogorets Arena; Attendance: 750; Referee: Kalin Lyudmilov

7 December 2013 21	Ludogorets Razgrad	0–1	Levski Sofia	Razgrad
15:15 EEST	Caiçara (yellow card) 26' (yellow-red card) 90+2'	Report	Touré 3'; Angelov (yellow card) 17' (yellow-red card) 75'	Stadium: Ludogorets Arena; Attendance: 3,600; Referee: Georrgie Yordanov

15 December 2013 22	Ludogorets Razgrad	4–0	Lokomotiv Sofia	Razgrad
16:30 EEST	Marcelinho 51', 64'; Abalo 83', 90+4'	Report		Stadium: Ludogorets Arena; Attendance: 650; Referee: Vladimir Valkov

15 February 2014 23	Neftochimic	0–3	Ludogorets Razgrad	Burgas
14:30 EEST		Report	Misidjan 22'; Zlatinski 35'; Bezjak 73'	Stadium: Lazur Stadium; Attendance: 480; Referee: Georgi Kabakov

23 February 2014 24	Botev Plovdiv	2–2	Ludogorets Razgrad	Plovdiv
14:00 EEST	Younés 14', 52'	Report	Moți 23'; Misidjan 63'	Stadium: Hristo Botev Stadium; Attendance: 2,900; Referee: Nikolay Yordanov

2 March 2014 25	Ludogorets Razgrad	5–0	Pirin Gotse Delchev	Razgrad
17:30 EEST	Hernández 57', 90'; Zlatinski 63'; Juninho 75'; Platini 80'	Report		Stadium: Ludogorets Arena; Attendance: 850; Referee: Kalin Lyudmilov

9 March 2014 26	Litex Lovech	0–0	Ludogorets Razgrad	Lovech
19:30 EEST		Report		Stadium: Lovech Stadium; Attendance: 4,100; Referee: Georgie Yordanov

==== Championship group ====
===== Table =====
Pos	Team	Pld	W	D	L	GF	GA	GD	Pts	Qualification
1	Ludogorets Razgrad (C)	38	25	9	4	74	20	+54	84	Qualification for Champions League second qualifying round
2	CSKA Sofia	38	21	9	8	56	20	+36	72 (Note: CSKA Sofia ahead of Litex Lovech on head-to-head points; CSKA Sofia: 10 pts, Litex Lovech: 1 pts.)	Qualification for Europa League second qualifying round
3	Litex Lovech	38	21	9	8	74	37	+37	72	Qualification for Europa League first qualifying round
4	Botev Plovdiv	38	18	11	9	57	32	+25	65	Qualification for Europa League first qualifying round
5	Levski Sofia	38	19	5	14	59	39	+20	62	

Source: A PFG (in Bulgarian)
Rules for classification: 1st points; 2nd head-to-head points; 3rd head-to-head goal difference; 4th head-to-head goals scored; 5th head-to-head away goals scored; 6th season goal difference; 7th season goals scored; 8th "sportsmanship" (R & Y cards); 9th draw
(C) Champions

===== Results summary =====
Overall								Home						Away					
Pld	W	D	L	GF	GA	GD	Pts	W	D	L	GF	GA	GD	W	D	L	GF	GA	GD
12	7	5	0	18	5	+13	26	5	1	0	11	1	+10	2	4	0	7	4	+3

Last updated: 20 May 2014.
Source: Soccerway

===== Results by round =====
Round	1	2	3	4	5	6	7	8	9	10	11	12
Ground	H	A	H	A	H	A	A	H	A	H	A	H
Result	W	W	D	D	W	D	D	W	D	W	W	W
Position	1	1	1	1	1	1	1	1	1	1	1	1

Source: bulgarian-football.com
A = Away; H = Home; W = Win; D = Draw; L = Loss

===== Results =====
23 March 2014 27	Ludogorets Razgrad	3–0	Litex Lovech	Razgrad
19:30 EET	Juninho 17'; Marcelinho 23'; Zlatinski 67' (pen.)	Report		Stadium: Ludogorets Arena; Attendance: 5,500; Referee: Nikolay Yordanov

26 March 2014 28	CSKA Sofia	0–1	Ludogorets Razgrad	Sofia
19:30 EET		Report	Abalo 77'	Stadium: Balgarska Armia Stadium; Attendance: 5,900; Referee: Georgie Yordanov

30 March 2014 29	Ludogorets Razgrad	1–1	Botev Plovdiv	Razgrad
19:30 EEST	Zlatinski 22' (pen.)	Report	Curtean 42'; Luchin (yellow card) 21' (yellow-red card) 78'	Stadium: Ludogorets Arena; Attendance: 5,500; Referee: Alexandre Kostadinov

5 April 2014 30	Lokomotiv Plovdiv	1–1	Ludogorets Razgrad	Plovdiv
16:15 EEST	Minev 60'	Report	Misidjan 34'	Stadium: Lokomotiv Stadium; Attendance: 800; Referee: Ivaylo Stoyanov

9 April 2014 31	Ludogorets Razgrad	2–0	Levski Sofia	Razgrad
19:15 EEST	Zlatinski 73' (pen.); Bezjak 90+3'	Report	Belaïd (yellow card) 82' (yellow-red card) 84'	Stadium: Ludogorets Arena; Attendance: 5,900; Referee: Nikolay Yordanov

13 April 2014 32	Cherno More	1–1	Ludogorets Razgrad	Varna
15:45 EEST	Bacari 90+2'	Report	Zlatinski 78' (pen.)	Stadium: Ticha Stadium; Attendance: 1,300; Referee: Georgie Yordanov

27 April 2014 33	Litex Lovech	0–0	Ludogorets Razgrad	Lovech
19:30 EEST		Report		Stadium: Lovech Stadium; Attendance: 1,100; Referee: Stanislav Todorov

30 April 2014 34	Ludogorets Razgrad	1–0	CSKA Sofia	Razgrad
19:15 EEST	Moți (red card) 85'; Lumu 89'	Report	Popov (red card) 90+1'	Stadium: Ludogorets Arena; Attendance: 6,000; Referee: Ivaylo Stoyanov

3 May 2014 35	Botev Plovdiv	0–0	Ludogorets Razgrad	Plovdiv
16:15 EEST		Report		Stadium: Hristo Botev Stadium; Attendance: 2,500; Referee: Nikolay Yordanov

7 May 2014 36	Ludogorets Razgrad	1–0	Lokomotiv Plovdiv	Razgrad
19:30 EEST	Bezjak 9'	Report		Stadium: Ludogorets Arena; Attendance: 3,900; Referee: Georgie Yordanov

11 May 2014 37	Levski Sofia	2–3	Ludogorets Razgrad	Sofia
19:30 EEST	Bojinov 27', 90+4' (pen.)	Report	Hernández 29'; Juninho 48'; Abalo 87'	Stadium: Georgi Asparuhov Stadium; Attendance: 1,500; Referee: Stanislav Todorov

18 May 2014 38	Ludogorets Razgrad	3–1	Cherno More	Razgrad
19:30 EEST	Choco 9'; Juninho 19'; K.Kitov 88'	Report	Okoro 12'	Stadium: Ludogorets Arena; Attendance: 6,000; Referee: Kalin Lyudmilov

=== Bulgarian Cup ===
9 October 2013 1st Round 1st leg	Ludogorets Razgrad	4–1	Dunav Ruse	Razgrad
18:00 EEST	Platini 16'; Marcelinho 33'; Barthe 56'; Abalo 76'	Report	Dimov 65'	Stadium: Ludogorets Arena; Attendance: 1,600; Referee: Dragomir Draganov

12 October 2013 1st Round 2nd leg	Dunav Ruse	1–2 (2–6 agg.)	Ludogorets Razgrad	Ruse
15:00 EEST	Kaptiev 90+1'	Report	Misidjan 63'; Aleksandrov 76'	Stadium: Gradski; Attendance: 2,200; Referee: Ivan Kirilov

14 November 2013 2nd Round 1st leg	Ludogorets Razgrad	2–1	Beroe Stara Zagora	Razgrad
18:00 EEST	Moţi 45+4'; Aleksandrov 60'	Report	I. Ivanov 21'; Krumov (red card) 74'	Stadium: Ludogorets Arena; Attendance: 2,270; Referee: Aleksandar Kostadinov

17 November 2013 2nd Round 2nd leg	Beroe Stara Zagora	1–1 (2–3 agg.)	Ludogorets Razgrad	Stara Zagora
18:00 EEST	Hristov 41'	Report	Iliev 4' (o.g.)	Stadium: Beroe Stadium; Attendance: 3,440; Referee: Georgi Kabakov

16 March 2014 Quarterfinal 1st leg	Litex Lovech	1–2	Ludogorets Razgrad	Lovech
19:30 EEST	Manolov 70'	Report	Zlatinski 13'; Moți 25'	Stadium: Lovech Stadium; Attendance: 1,850; Referee: Nikola Popov

2 April 2014 Quarterfinal 2nd leg	Ludogorets Razgrad	2–1 (4–2 agg.)	Litex Lovech	Razgrad
18:00 EEST	Moți 45+1'; Nikolov 68' (o.g.)	Report	Tsvetanov 35'	Stadium: Ludogorets Arena; Attendance: 2,700; Referee: Stanislav Todorov

16 April 2014 Semi Final 1st leg	Ludogorets Razgrad	2–0	Lokomotiv Plovdiv	Razgrad
18:00 EEST	Lumu 44'; Zlatinski 65' (pen.); A.Aleksandrov (yellow card) 69' (yellow-red card) 70'	Report		Stadium: Ludogorets Arena; Attendance: 1,620; Referee: Hristo Ristoskov

23 April 2014 Semi Final 2nd leg	Lokomotiv Plovdiv	1–0 (1–2 agg.)	Ludogorets Razgrad	Plovdiv
18:00 EEST	Kamburov 59'	Report		Stadium: Lokomotiv Stadium; Attendance: 2,200; Referee: Kalin Lyudmilov

==== Final ====
15 May 2014	Botev Plovdiv	0–1	Ludogorets Razgrad	Burgas
15:00 EEST	Vander (red card) 90+2'	Report	Bezjak 58'	Stadium: Lazur Stadium; Attendance: 15,000; Referee: Georgi Yordanov (Gabrovo)

=== Champions League ===
==== Qualifying stage ====
17 July 2013 2nd qualifying round 1st leg	Slovan Bratislava (Slovakia)	2–1	(Bulgaria) Ludogorets Razgrad	Bratislava, Slovakia
21:15 EEST	Halenár 87', 90+3'	Report	Mäntylä 65'	Stadium: Pasienky; Attendance: 8,126; Referee: Anthony Taylor (England)

24 July 2013 2nd qualifying round 2nd leg	Ludogorets Razgrad (Bulgaria)	3–0 (4–2 agg.)	(Slovakia) Slovan Bratislava	Razgrad, Bulgaria
20:30 EEST	Stoyanov 3'; Abalo 12', 78'	Report		Stadium: Ludogorets Arena; Attendance: 3,890; Referee: Mauro Bergonzi (Italy)

31 July 2013 3rd qualifying round 1st leg	Ludogorets Razgrad (Bulgaria)	2–1	(Serbia) Partizan	Razgrad, Bulgaria
20:30 EEST	Marcelinho 54'; Aleksandrov 65'	Report	Marković 49'	Stadium: Ludogorets Arena; Attendance: 7,000; Referee: Michael Koukoulakis (Greece)

6 August 2013 3rd qualifying round 2nd leg	Partizan (Serbia)	0–1 (1–3 agg.)	(Bulgaria) Ludogorets Razgrad	Belgrade, Serbia
21:45 EEST		Report	Zlatinski 88' (pen.)	Stadium: Partizan; Attendance: 22,312; Referee: Alan Kelly (Ireland)

21 August 2013 Play-off Round 1st leg	Ludogorets Razgrad (Bulgaria)	2–4	(Switzerland) Basel	Sofia, Bulgaria
21:45 EEST	Marcelinho 23'; Stoyanov 50'; Caiçara (yellow card) 34' (red card) 83'	Report	Salah 12', 59'; Sio 64'; Schär 84' (pen.)	Stadium: Vasil Levski; Attendance: 11,927; Referee: Wolfgang Stark (Germany)

27 August 2013 Play-off Round 2nd leg	Basel (Switzerland)	2–0 (6–2 agg.)	(Bulgaria) Ludogorets Razgrad	Basel, Switzerland
21:45 EEST	Frei 11'; P. Degen 79'	Report		Stadium: St. Jakob-Park; Attendance: 15,733; Referee: Willie Collum (Scotland)

=== Europa League ===
==== Group stage ====
Pos	Team	Pld	W	D	L	GF	GA	GD	Pts	Qualification	LUD	CHO	PSV	DIN
1	(Bulgaria) Ludogorets Razgrad	6	5	1	0	11	2	+9	16	Advance to knockout phase	—	1–1	2–0	3–0
2	(Ukraine) Chornomorets Odesa	6	3	1	2	6	6	0	10	Advance to knockout phase	0–1	—	0–2	2–1
3	(Netherlands) PSV Eindhoven	6	2	1	3	4	5	−1	7		0–2	0–1	—	2–0
4	(Croatia) Dinamo Zagreb	6	0	1	5	3	11	−8	1		1–2	1–2	0–0	—

Source: Soccerway

19 September 2013 1	PSV Eindhoven (Netherlands)	0–2	(Bulgaria) Ludogorets Razgrad	Eindhoven, Netherlands
20:00 EEST		Report	Bezjak 60'; Misidjan 74'	Stadium: Philips Stadion; Attendance: 11,000; Referee: Ivan Kružliak (Slovakia)

3 October 2013 2	Ludogorets Razgrad (Bulgaria)	3–0	(Croatia) Dinamo Zagreb	Sofia, Bulgaria
22:05 EEST	Juninho 12'; Misidjan 34'; Dyakov 61'	Report		Stadium: Vasil Levski National Stadium; Attendance: 6,900; Referee: Stephan Studer (Switzerland)

24 October 2013 3	Chornomorets Odesa (Ukraine)	0–1	(Bulgaria) Ludogorets Razgrad	Odesa, Ukraine
22:05 EEST		Report	Zlatinski 45'	Stadium: Chornomorets Stadium; Attendance: 20,082; Referee: Alexandru Tudor (Romania)

7 November 2013 4	Ludogorets Razgrad (Bulgaria)	1–1	(Ukraine) Chornomorets Odesa	Sofia, Bulgaria
20:00 EET	Juninho 47'	Report	Gai 64'	Stadium: Vasil Levski National Stadium; Attendance: 6,113; Referee: Stefan Johannesson (Sweden)

28 November 2013 5	Ludogorets Razgrad (Bulgaria)	2–0	(Netherlands) PSV Eindhoven	Sofia, Bulgaria
22:05 EET	Bezjak 38', 79'	Report	Bruma (yellow card) 40' (yellow-red card) 55'	Stadium: Vasil Levski National Stadium; Attendance: 3,012; Referee: Nicola Rizzoli (Italy)

12 December 2013 6	Dinamo Zagreb (Croatia)	1–2	(Bulgaria) Ludogorets Razgrad	Zagreb, Croatia
20:00 EET	Čop 45+1'	Report	Abalo 28'; Bezjak 72'	Stadium: Stadion Maksimir; Attendance: 3,120; Referee: Vladislav Bezborodov (Russia)

==== Knockout phase ====
20 February 2014 Round of 32 1st leg	Lazio (Italy)	0–1	(Bulgaria) Ludogorets Razgrad	Rome, Italy
22:05 EET	Cavanda (red card) 73'	Report	Bezjak 45'; Dyakov (yellow card) 36' (yellow-red card) 55'	Stadium: Stadio Olimpico; Attendance: 7,459; Referee: Felix Zwayer (Germany)

27 February 2014 Round of 32 2nd leg	Ludogorets Razgrad (Bulgaria)	3–3 (4–3 agg.)	(Italy) Lazio	Sofia, Bulgaria
20:00 EET	Bezjak 67'; Zlatinski 78'; Juninho 88'	Report	Baldé 1'; Perea 54'; Klose 82'	Stadium: Vasil Levski National Stadium; Attendance: 28,742; Referee: Olegário Benquerença (Portugal)

13 March 2014 Round of 16 1st leg	Ludogorets Razgrad (Bulgaria)	0–3	(Spain) Valencia	Sofia, Bulgaria
20:00 EET	Juninho (red card) 80'	Report	Barragán 5'; Keita (red card) 24'; Cartabia 33'; Senderos 59'	Stadium: Vasil Levski National Stadium; Attendance: 41,085; Referee: Clément Turpin (France)

20 March 2014 Round of 16 2nd leg	Valencia (Spain)	1–0 (4–0 agg.)	(Bulgaria) Ludogorets Razgrad	Valencia, Spain
20:00 EET	Alcácer 59'	Report		Stadium: Mestalla; Attendance: 18,429; Referee: Anastasios Sidiropoulos (Greece)

Notes

1. Ludogorets Razgrad played their home matches at Vasil Levski National Stadium, Sofia instead of their regular stadium, Ludogorets Arena, Razgrad.

== Squad statistics ==
As of 2 June 2014

=== Appearances and goals ===
No.	Pos	Nat	Player	Total		A Group		Bulgarian Cup		Supercup		Europe	
No.	Pos	Nat	Player	Apps	Goals	Apps	Goals	Apps	Goals	Apps	Goals	Apps	Goals
4	DF	(Finland) FIN	Tero Mäntylä	27	1	15+2	0	1	0	1	0	8	1
5	DF	(France) FRA	Alexandre Barthe	29	1	16+1	0	2	1	0+1	0	9	0
7	MF	(Bulgaria) BUL	Mihail Aleksandrov	49	7	18+10	4	5+2	2	0	0	9+5	1
8	MF	(Portugal) POR	Espinho	53	2	25+4	2	8+1	0	1	0	6+8	0
9	FW	(Slovenia) SLO	Roman Bezjak	51	20	21+10	13	3+2	1	0	0	12+3	6
10	MF	(Colombia) COL	Sebastián Hernández	19	6	9+4	6	3+1	0	0	0	0+2	0
11	MF	(Brazil) BRA	Juninho	44	10	13+17	7	4+3	0	0	0	3+4	3
14	MF	(Netherlands) NED	Mitchell Burgzorg	16	0	8+4	0	2+1	0	0	0	0+1	0
15	DF	(Bulgaria) BUL	Aleksandar Aleksandrov	10	0	7+1	0	1+1	0	0	0	0	0
16	MF	(Bulgaria) BUL	Kristiyan Kitov	3	0	0+1	0	0+2	0	0	0	0	0
17	MF	(Spain) ESP	Abalo	42	10	15+11	6	4+3	1	0	0	6+3	3
18	MF	(Bulgaria) BUL	Svetoslav Dyakov	40	4	22	2	2+1	0	1	1	14	1
19	FW	(Bulgaria) BUL	Dimo Bakalov	9	0	3+3	0	0+1	0	0	0	0+2	0
20	DF	(Bulgaria) BUL	Choco	31	1	20+3	1	4+1	0	0	0	3	0
21	GK	(Bulgaria) BUL	Vladislav Stoyanov	47	0	30	0	1	0	1	0	15	0
23	MF	(Bulgaria) BUL	Hristo Zlatinski	51	12	22+6	7	6+1	2	0+1	0	13+2	3
25	DF	(Bulgaria) BUL	Yordan Minev	40	0	20+1	0	5	0	0+1	0	13	0
27	DF	(Romania) ROU	Cosmin Moți	51	6	28+1	3	8	3	1	0	13	0
30	GK	(Bulgaria) BUL	Georgi Argilashki	2	0	0	0	2	0	0	0	0	0
55	DF	(Bulgaria) BUL	Georgi Terziev	19	0	9+2	0	5	0	0	0	2+1	0
77	DF	(Portugal) POR	Vitinha	16	0	7+2	0	4	0	1	0	0+2	0
80	DF	(Brazil) BRA	Júnior Caiçara	53	0	29	0	7+1	0	1	0	15	0
84	MF	(Brazil) BRA	Marcelinho	55	12	29+3	9	6+1	1	1	0	15	2
91	GK	(Bulgaria) BUL	Ivan Čvorović	16	0	8+1	0	6	0	0	0	1	0
93	FW	(Netherlands) NED	Virgil Misidjan	43	12	23+5	9	4+1	1	0	0	9+1	2
95	FW	(Netherlands) NED	Jeroen Lumu	16	2	8+3	1	2+1	1	0	0	0+2	0
99	FW	(Brazil) BRA	Michel Platini	23	4	4+9	3	2+1	1	1	0	1+5	0
Players who appeared for Ludogorets Razgrad that left during the season:
6	MF	(Bulgaria) BUL	Georgi Kostadinov	1	0	0+1	0	0	0	0	0	0	0
22	MF	(Bulgaria) BUL	Miroslav Ivanov	4	0	1+2	0	0	0	1	0	0	0
73	MF	(Bulgaria) BUL	Ivan Stoyanov	27	2	8+4	0	2+1	0	1	0	7+4	2

=== Scorers ===
Place	Position	Nation	Number	Name	A Group	Bulgarian Cup	Supercup	Champions League	Europa League	Total
1	FW	(Slovenia)	9	Roman Bezjak	13	1	0	0	6	20
2	MF	(Brazil)	84	Marcelinho	9	1	0	2	0	12
2	FW	(Netherlands)	93	Virgil Misidjan	9	1	0	0	2	12
2	MF	(Bulgaria)	23	Hristo Zlatinski	7	2	0	1	2	12
5	MF	(Brazil)	11	Juninho	7	0	0	0	3	10
5	MF	(Spain)	17	Abalo	6	1	0	2	1	10
7	MF	(Bulgaria)	7	Mihail Aleksandrov	4	2	0	1	0	7
8	MF	(Colombia)	10	Sebastián Hernández	6	0	0	0	0	6
8	DF	(Romania)	27	Cosmin Moți	3	3	0	0	0	6
10	FW	(Brazil)	99	Michel Platini	3	1	0	0	0	4
10	MF	(Bulgaria)	18	Svetoslav Dyakov	2	0	1	0	1	4
12	MF	(Portugal)	8	Espinho	2	0	0	0	0	2
12	FW	(Netherlands)	95	Jeroen Lumu	1	1	0	0	0	2
12	MF	(Bulgaria)	73	Ivan Stoyanov	0	0	0	2	0	2
12				Own goal	0	2	0	0	0	2
16	DF	(Bulgaria)	20	Choco	1	0	0	0	0	1
16	DF	(France)	5	Alexandre Barthe	0	1	0	0	0	1
16	DF	(Finland)	4	Tero Mäntylä	0	0	0	1	0	1
				TOTALS	74	16	1	9	15	115

=== Disciplinary record ===
Number	Nation	Position	Name	A Group		Bulgarian Cup		Supercup		Champions League		Europa League		Total	
Number	Nation	Position	Name	Yellow card	Red card	Yellow card	Red card	Yellow card	Red card	Yellow card	Red card	Yellow card	Red card	Yellow card	Red card
4	(Finland)	DF	Tero Mäntylä	1	0	0	0	1	0	0	0	0	0	2	0
5	(France)	DF	Alexandre Barthe	4	0	0	0	0	0	0	0	0	0	4	0
7	(Bulgaria)	MF	Mihail Aleksandrov	3	0	2	0	0	0	0	0	0	0	5	0
8	(Portugal)	MF	Espinho	7	0	2	0	0	0	2	0	2	0	14	0
9	(Slovenia)	FW	Roman Bezjak	7	0	1	0	0	0	1	0	2	0	11	0
10	(Colombia)	MF	Sebastián Hernández	2	0	2	0	0	0	0	0	0	0	4	0
11	(Brazil)	MF	Juninho Quixadá	1	1	1	0	0	0	0	0	1	1	3	2
14	(Netherlands)	MF	Mitchell Burgzorg	3	0	0	0	0	0	0	0	0	0	3	0
15	(Bulgaria)	DF	Aleksandar Aleksandrov	3	0	2	1	0	0	0	0	0	0	5	1
17	(Spain)	MF	Abalo	4	0	1	0	0	0	2	0	1	0	8	0
18	(Bulgaria)	MF	Svetoslav Dyakov	5	0	2	0	2	1	1	0	6	1	16	2
19	(Bulgaria)	FW	Dimo Bakalov	0	0	0	0	0	0	1	0	0	0	1	0
20	(Bulgaria)	DF	Choco	4	0	1	0	0	0	0	0	0	0	5	0
21	(Bulgaria)	GK	Vladislav Stoyanov	1	0	0	0	1	0	1	0	0	0	3	0
23	(Bulgaria)	MF	Hristo Zlatinski	6	0	1	0	0	0	1	0	3	0	11	0
25	(Bulgaria)	DF	Yordan Minev	6	0	1	0	0	0	1	0	1	0	9	0
27	(Romania)	DF	Cosmin Moți	6	2	1	0	1	0	4	0	4	0	16	2
55	(Bulgaria)	DF	Georgi Terziev	2	0	2	0	0	0	0	0	0	0	4	0
77	(Portugal)	DF	Vitinha	2	0	1	0	0	0	0	0	0	0	3	0
80	(Brazil)	DF	Júnior Caiçara	6	1	1	0	0	0	2	1	2	0	11	2
84	(Brazil)	MF	Marcelinho	3	0	1	0	1	0	0	0	1	0	6	0
91	(Bulgaria)	GK	Ivan Čvorović	0	0	1	0	0	0	0	0	0	0	1	0
93	(Netherlands)	FW	Virgil Misidjan	4	0	0	0	0	0	0	0	1	0	5	0
95	(Netherlands)	FW	Jeroen Lumu	0	0	1	0	0	0	0	0	0	0	1	0
Players who left Ludogorets Razgrad during the season:
22	(Bulgaria)	DF	Miroslav Ivanov	0	0	0	0	1	0	0	0	0	0	1	0
73	(Bulgaria)	MF	Ivan Stoyanov	1	0	0	0	0	0	1	0	0	0	2	0
			TOTALS	81	4	24	1	7	1	17	1	25	2	154	9

== Club ==
=== Coaching staff ===
Position	Staff
Coach	(Bulgaria) Stoycho Stoev
Assistant coach	(Bulgaria) Georgi Dermendzhiev
Assistant coach	(Bulgaria) Yavor Valchinov
Goalkeeping coach	(Bulgaria) Nikolay Donev
Club doctor	(Bulgaria) Ivaylo Yakimov

Last updated: 1 August 2013
Source: Ludogorets

=== Kit ===
Supplier: Adidas
Sponsor(s): Navibulgar

Home	Away	Third	GK Home	GK Away

Last updated: 19 July 2013.

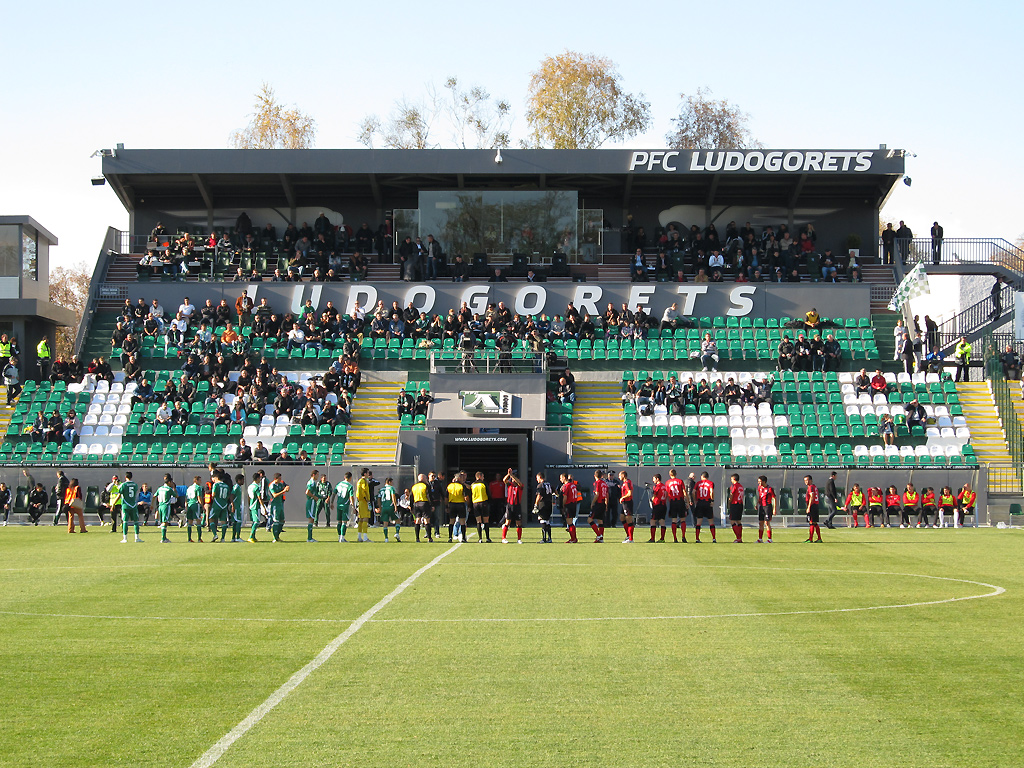
Ludogorets Arena

=== Other information ===
Chairman	(Bulgaria) Kiril Domuschiev
Ground (capacity and dimensions)	Ludogorets Arena (6,100 / 110x76 metres)

Updated to match played 19 July 2013
Source: Ludogorets
