= Grigor Dolapchiev =

Bulgarian footballer

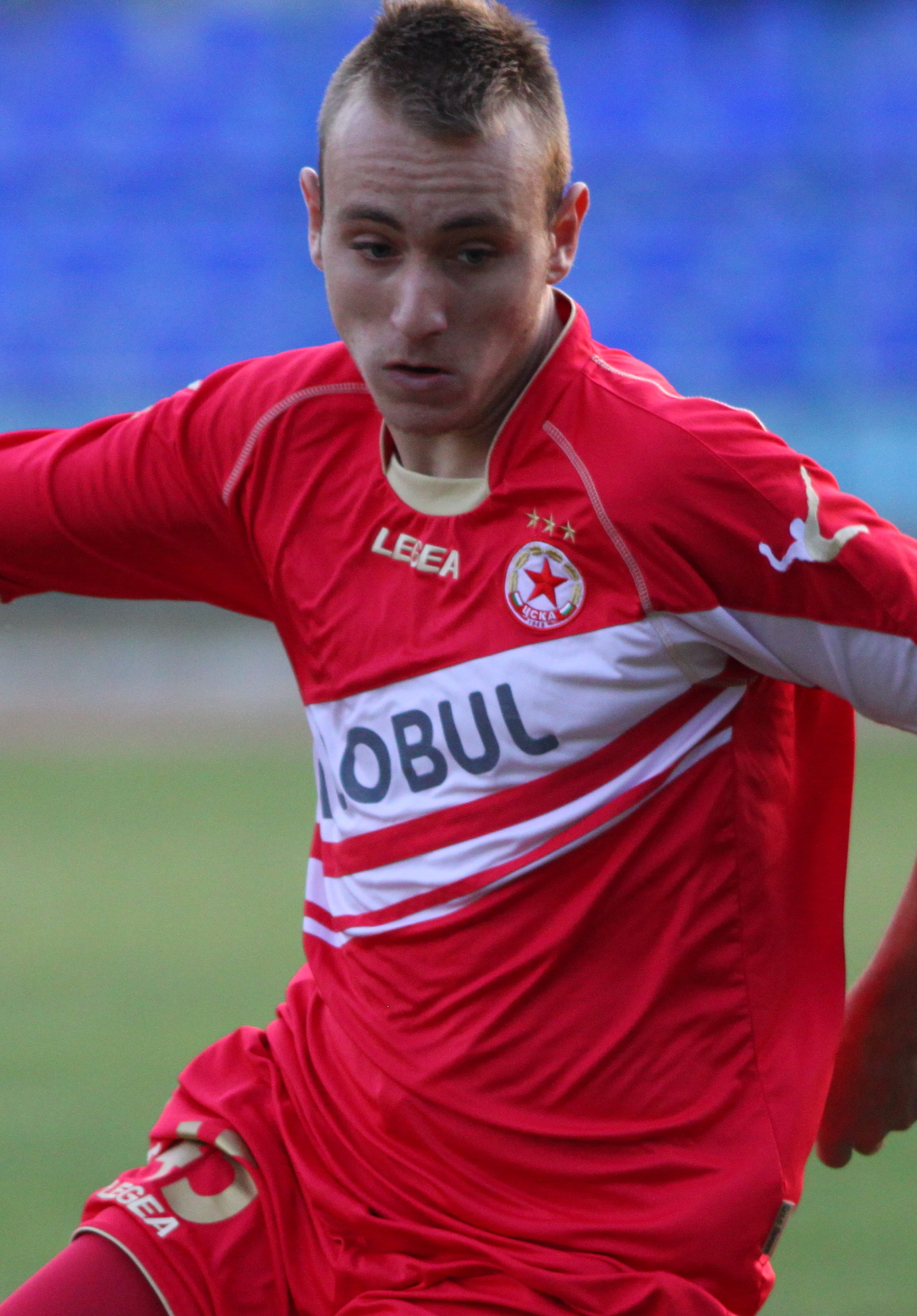
- Dolapchiev playing for CSKA in 2012

Personal information
- Full name: Grigor Ivaylov Dolapchiev
- Date of birth: 23 February 1994 (age 32)
- Place of birth: Sofia, Bulgaria
- Height: 6 ft 1 in (1.85 m)
- Position: Forward

Team information
- Current team: Rilski Sportist
- Number: 94

Youth career
- 2003–2012: CSKA Sofia

Senior career*
Years	Team	Apps	(Gls)
2012–2015	CSKA Sofia	13	(4)
2014	→ Turnovo (loan)	16	(2)
2015	→ Haskovo (loan)	12	(1)
2015–2016	Oborishte	14	(1)
2016–2017	Spartak Pleven	31	(14)
2017–2019	Vitosha Bistritsa	53	(10)
2020	Dunav Ruse	10	(3)
2020	Sportist Svoge	14	(5)
2021	Lokomotiv Sofia	13	(3)
2021	Sportist Svoge	7	(0)
2021	Cattolica	2	(0)
2022	Balkan Botevgrad	10	(2)
2022	Chernomorets Burgas	19	(19)
2023	Minyor Pernik	16	(5)
2023–2024	Botev Ihtiman	34	(15)
2024–	Rilski Sportist	49	(26)

International career
2012–2013	Bulgaria U19	5	(1)
- * Club domestic league appearances and goals as of 5 January 2026

Grigor Ivaylov Dolapchiev (Bulgarian: Григор Долапчиев; born 23 February 1994) is a Bulgarian professional footballer who plays as a forward for Rilski Sportist Samokov.

== Club career ==
Dolapchiev joined the CSKA Academy at the age of nine in 2003.

He made his senior debut on 31 August 2012, at the age of 18, coming on as a substitute for Stanko Yovchev in a 4–1 victory over Minyor Pernik. On 15 December, Dolapchiev came off the bench to score his first senior goal for the club in a 5–0 Bulgarian Cup win against Chavdar Etropole. In mid July 2013, following a change in the club's ownership, he signed his first professional contract with CSKA Sofia. On 29 July 2013, Dolapchiev scored an equalizing goal against Beroe in an A PFG match shortly after coming on as a substitute. On 19 October 2013, he made his first appearance in The Eternal Derby of Bulgaria after coming on as a late second-half substitute in the 3:0 home win over Levski Sofia.

After a loan spell at Horizont Turnovo, Dolapchiev rejoined CSKA Sofia in December 2014. However, in January 2015 he was loaned out to Haskovo until the end of the A PFG season. He subsequently returned to CSKA Sofia once again to play for the team in the third division of Bulgarian football, but was eventually released by Hristo Yanev and moved to Oborishte in the B PFG. In January 2016, Dolapchiev signed for Spartak Pleven. On 25 April 2017, he terminated his contract due to unpaid wages.

On 20 June 2017, Dolapchiev signed with Vitosha Bistritsa. On 21 July 2017, he scored the first ever goal in the top division for the "tigers" from Bistritsa, finding the net in the 1:1 draw with Etar Veliko Tarnovo.

== International career ==
In August 2013, Dolapchiev earned his first call-up to the Bulgaria U21 national side, but did not debut.

== Statistics ==
As of 26 September 2019

Professional Club Performance
Club	Season	League		Cup		Continental		Other		Total	
Club	Season	Apps	Goals	Apps	Goals	Apps	Goals	Apps	Goals	Apps	Goals
CSKA Sofia	2012–13	4	1	1	1	0	0	—		5	2
CSKA Sofia	2013–14	9	3	3	1	0	0	—		12	4
Turnovo (loan)	2014–15	16	2	2	4	2	0	—		20	6
Haskovo (loan)	2014–15	12	0	1	0	—		—		13	0
Oborishte	2015–16	14	1	1	0	—		—		15	1
Spartak Pleven	2015–16	12	7	0	0	—		—		12	7
Spartak Pleven	2016–17	19	7	1	0	—		—		20	7
Vitosha Bistritsa	2017–18	19	4	0	0	—		3	1	22	5
Vitosha Bistritsa	2018–19	19	5	1	0	—		3	1	23	6
Vitosha Bistritsa	2019–20	7	0	1	2	—		—		8	2
Total		131	30	11	8	2	0	6	2	150	40
