= Keegan Ritchie =

South African soccer player (born 1990)

Personal information
- Full name: Keegan James Ritchie
- Date of birth: 3 July 1990 (age 36)
- Place of birth: Alberton, South Africa
- Height: 1.83 m (6 ft 0 in)
- Position: Left-back

Youth career
- Robertsham Callies
- Balfour Park
- Supersport United
- Lusitano FC
- Moroka Swallows

Senior career*
Years	Team	Apps	(Gls)
2009–2011	Moroka Swallows	39	(0)
2011–2014	Kaizer Chiefs	28	(0)
2014	Slavia Prague	4	(0)
2014–2015	Bloemfontein Celtic	19	(0)
2015–2016	Kaizer Chiefs	6	(0)
2016–2018	SuperSport United	5	(0)
2018–2020	Bidvest Wits	27	(3)
2020–2021	Moroka Swallows	4	(0)
2021–2023	Maritzburg United	35	(1)
- * Club domestic league appearances and goals as of 11 January 2024

Keegan Ritchie (born 3 July 1990) is a South African football player who last played as a defender for South African Premier Division club Maritzburg United F.C.

He is known for two spells in Moroka Swallows. He initially moved from Moroka Swallows to one of South Africas big three clubs, Kaizer Chiefs, which he later regarded as coming too early in his career. In 2014 he moved abroad for the only time in his career, to Czech club After returning to South Africa, he also spent time in Bloemfontein Celtic, SuperSport United and Bidvest Wits.
