= Dani Abalo =

Spanish footballer (born 1987)

Personal information
- Full name: Daniel Abalo Paulos
- Date of birth: 29 September 1987 (age 39)
- Place of birth: Vilagarcía de Arousa, Spain
- Height: 1.74 m (5 ft 9 in)
- Position: Winger

Youth career
- Vilagarcía SD
- Cambados
- 2005: Celta

Senior career*
Years	Team	Apps	(Gls)
2005–2008	Celta B	84	(10)
2006–2013	Celta	104	(7)
2012	→ Gimnàstic (loan)	17	(0)
2013	→ Beira-Mar (loan)	8	(2)
2013–2015	Ludogorets Razgrad	54	(13)
2015–2016	Sivasspor	11	(1)
2016	Alavés	7	(0)
2016–2017	Korona Kielce	22	(1)
2017–2019	Cartagena	20	(0)
2018–2019	→ Langreo (loan)	31	(6)
2019–2021	Racing Ferrol	27	(0)
Total		385	(40)
- * Club domestic league appearances and goals

Daniel "Dani" Abalo Paulos (Spanish pronunciation: [daˈnjel ˈdanjaˈβalo ˈpawlos]; born 29 September 1987) is a Spanish former professional footballer who played as a right winger.

He began his career at Celta, playing almost exclusively in the Segunda División, and won the Bulgarian league title twice with Ludogorets.

== Club career ==
=== Celta ===
Born in Vilagarcía de Arousa, Province of Pontevedra, Abalo joined local RC Celta de Vigo for his last year as a junior, then proceeded to make his senior debut with the B team in the Segunda División B. He made his first competitive appearance with the main squad, on 3 December 2006, coming in as a late substitute in a 2–2 La Liga away draw against RCD Mallorca. In late July 2009, he extended his contract with the Galicians until 2013, with a buyout clause of €10 million.

From 2008 to 2011, with Celta in the Segunda División, Abalo was an important first-team element. However, in the 2011–12 season, as the club returned to the top flight after an absence of five years, he contributed only four games and 67 minutes, being subsequently loaned in quick succession to Gimnàstic de Tarragona and S.C. Beira-Mar (the latter in Portugal).

=== Ludogorets ===
On 26 June 2013, Bulgarian champions PFC Ludogorets Razgrad announced they were set to sign Abalo after he became a free agent shortly after. The transfer was completed the following day after he passed his medical, and the player agreed to a two-year contract, being given the number 17 shirt.

Abalo played his first game with his new team on 17 July 2013, featuring in a 2–1 defeat away to ŠK Slovan Bratislava in the second qualifying round of the UEFA Champions League. He made his league debut three days later in the 1–0 loss at FC Lyubimets; in the second leg against Slovan on the 24th, he scored twice for a 3–0 win at Ludogorets Arena and the subsequent qualification.

Abalo made his debut in the Champions League group phase on 16 September 2014, grabbing a 1–1 equaliser away against Liverpool in the 90th minute, but in an eventual 2–1 defeat. He repeated the feat in the second match between the two sides, a 2–2 draw.

Having won the league title in both of his seasons, Abalo left Ludogorets in May 2015 with the intention of returning to Spain or moving to England.

=== Later career ===
On 24 July 2015, Abalo signed a two-year contract at Turkish Süper Lig club Sivasspor. He made his debut on 23 August, scoring from Cicinho's assist in a 4–2 loss at Eskişehirspor.

Abalo returned to his country on 20 January 2016, joining Deportivo Alavés until the end of the second-tier campaign. After gaining promotion with the Basques he travelled abroad again, to Poland's Korona Kielce on 3 September. He made his debut in the Ekstraklasa a week later, replacing compatriot Miguel Palanca for the final seven minutes of a 1–0 home win over Arka Gdynia; his first goal came on 17 October, again off the bench to equalise in a 1–2 loss to Śląsk Wrocław at the Kielce City Stadium.

On 31 August 2017, Abalo signed a three-year deal at FC Cartagena in Spain's third tier. His team won their group in his first season, but were eliminated from the playoffs by Extremadura UD, and in his second year he was loaned to UP Langreo of the same league; his contract was rescinded on 3 July 2019.

== Career statistics ==
Appearances and goals by club, season and competition
Club	Season	League			National Cup (Note: Includes Copa del Rey, Bulgarian Cup, Turkish Cup)		Continental		Other		Total	
Club	Season	Division	Apps	Goals	Apps	Goals	Apps	Goals	Apps	Goals	Apps	Goals
Celta B	2005–06	Segunda División B	15	3	—		—		—		0	0
Celta B	2006–07	Segunda División B	34	3	—		—		—		0	0
Celta B	2007–08	Segunda División B	35	4	—		—		—		0	0
Celta B	Total		84	10	0	0	0	0	0	0	84	10
Celta	2006–07	La Liga	1	0	0	0	—		—		1	0
Celta	2007–08	Segunda División	2	0	1	0	—		—		3	0
Celta	2008–09	Segunda División	35	2	3	0	—		—		38	2
Celta	2009–10	Segunda División	29	2	8	0	—		—		37	2
Celta	2010–11	Segunda División	33	3	1	1	—		2 (Note: Appearances in La Liga play-offs)	0	36	4
Celta	2011–12	Segunda División	4	0	2	0	—		—		6	0
Celta	2012–13	La Liga	0	0	1	0	—		—		1	0
Celta	Total		104	7	16	1	0	0	2	0	122	8
Gimnàstic (loan)	2011–12	Segunda División	17	0	0	0	—		—		17	0
Beira-Mar (loan)	2012–13	Primeira Liga	8	2	0	0	—		—		8	2
Ludogorets	2013–14	First Professional Football League	26	6	7	1	9 (Note: Five appearances and two goals in UEFA Champions League, four appearances and one goal in UEFA Europa League)	3	—		42	10
Ludogorets	2014–15	First Professional Football League	28	7	4	1	8 (Note: Appearances in UEFA Champions League)	3	1 (Note: Appearance in Bulgarian Supercup)	0	41	11
Ludogorets	Total		54	13	11	2	17	6	1	0	83	21
Sivasspor	2015–16	Süper Lig	11	1	1	0	—		—		12	1
Alavés	2015–16	Segunda División	7	0	0	0	—		—		7	0
Korona Kielce	2016–17	Ekstraklasa	21	1	0	0	—		—		21	1
Korona Kielce	2017–18	Ekstraklasa	1	0	0	0	—		—		1	0
Korona Kielce	Total		22	1	0	0	0	0	0	0	22	1
Cartagena	2017–18	Segunda División B	19	0	3	0	—		1 (Note: Appearance in Segunda División B play-offs)	0	23	0
Cartagena	2018–19	Segunda División B	1	0	0	0	—		—		1	0
Cartagena	Total		20	0	3	0	0	0	1	0	24	0
Langreo (loan)	2018–19	Segunda División B	31	6	1	0	—		—		32	6
Racing Ferrol	2019–20	Segunda División B	15	0	1	0	—		—		16	0
Racing Ferrol	2020–21	Segunda División B	12	0	0	0	—		—		12	0
Racing Ferrol	Total		27	0	1	0	0	0	0	0	28	0
Career total			385	40	33	3	17	6	4	0	439	49

== Honours ==
Ludogorets

- First Professional Football League: 2013–14, 2014–15
- Bulgarian Cup: 2013–14
- Bulgarian Supercup: 2014

Alavés

- Segunda División: 2015–16
