= Omar Kossoko =

French footballer (born 1988)

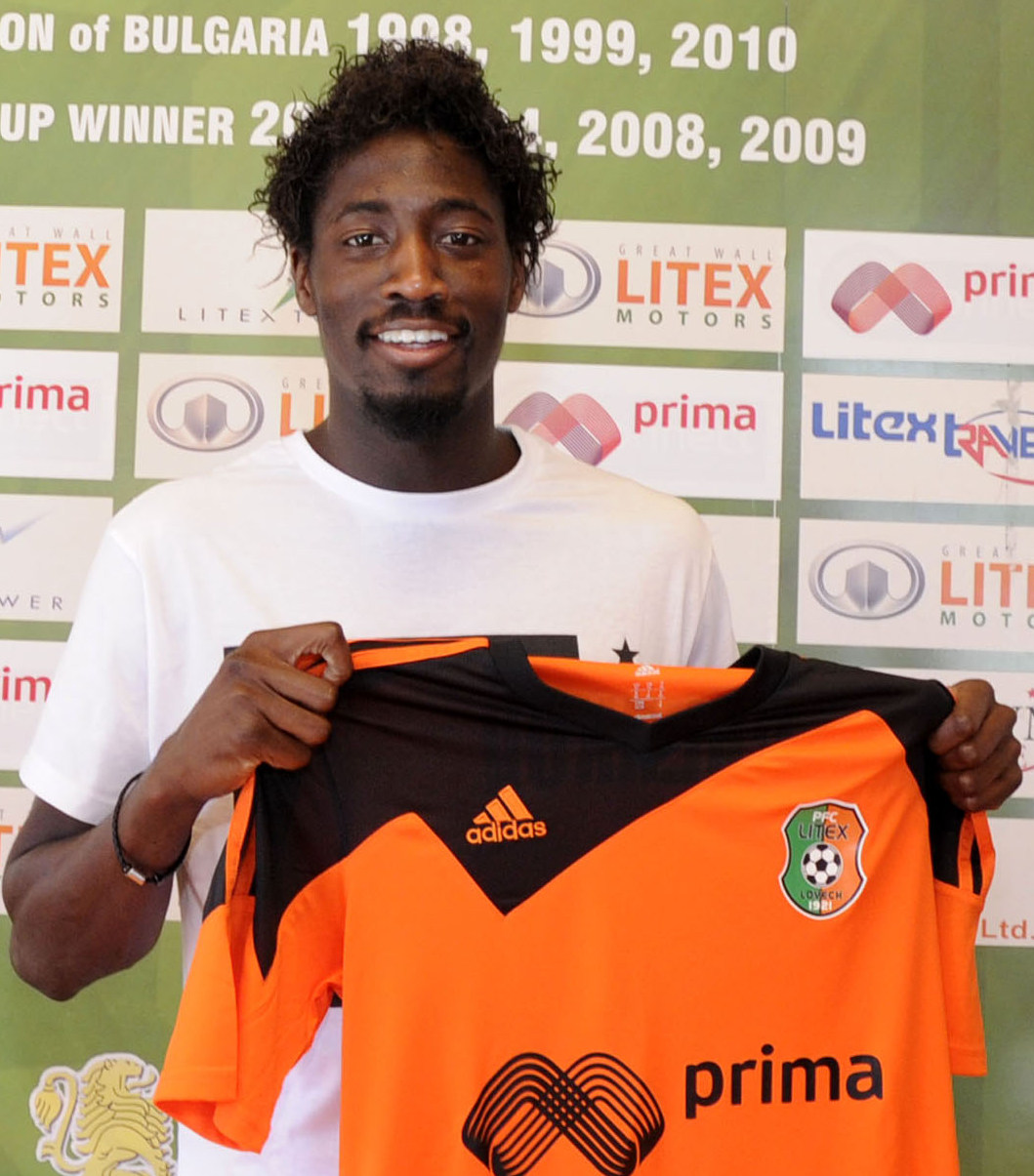
- Kossoko holding a Litex Lovech shirt

Personal information
- Date of birth: 10 March 1988 (age 38)
- Place of birth: Mantes-la-Jolie, France
- Height: 1.86 m (6 ft 1 in)
- Position: Winger

Youth career
- Mantes

Senior career*
| Years | Team | Apps | (Gls) |
| 2008–2011 | Amiens | 58 | (12) |
| 2011–2012 | Auxerre | 19 | (0) |
| 2011–2012 | Auxerre B | 5 | (0) |
| 2012–2013 | Crystal Palace | 1 | (0) |
| 2013 | Servette | 9 | (0) |
| 2013–2014 | CSKA Sofia | 26 | (5) |
| 2014 | Litex Lovech | 8 | (2) |
| 2016 | Mantes | 7 | (2) |
| 2016–2017 | Botev Plovdiv | 26 | (8) |
| 2017–2019 | Al-Fujairah | 19 | (1) |
| 2019–2020 | Al Urooba | | |
| Total | | 178+ | (30+) |
- * Club domestic league appearances and goals

Omar Kossoko (born 10 March 1988) is a French former professional footballer who played as a winger.

== Career ==
Born in Mantes-la-Jolie, Yvelines, Kossoko began his career with Mantes. In the summer of 2008 he signed for Amiens.

On 29 May 2011, he signed a three-year contract with Auxerre. In summer 2012, following his release by Auxerre, he trialled with English clubs Crystal Palace, Barnsley, and Bristol City.

On 15 February 2013, Kossoko joined Swiss Super League side Servette.

On 28 July 2013, following a short trial period, Kossoko signed for Bulgarian side CSKA Sofia on a one-year deal.

In June 2014, Kossoko went on trial with Azerbaijan Premier League side Inter Baku, but went on to sign a contract with Litex Lovech.

=== Botev Plovdiv ===
==== 2016–17 ====
On 29 September 2016, Kossoko joined Botev Plovdiv. He made his debut two days later, on 1 October, during the 0–0 draw with his former club CSKA-Sofia. On 16 October he scored a goal in the first minute and was sent off in the 65th minute in a 4–3 win over Beroe Stara Zagora.

On 22 April 2017, Kossoko scored twice and received the "Man on the Match" award during a 3–0 away win over Slavia Sofia. On 24 May 2017, he scored and provided an assist in a 2–1 win over Ludogorets Razgrad helping Botev Plovdiv to win the Bulgarian Cup for the third time in the history of the club.

==== 2017–18 ====
On 29 June 2017, Kossoko scored twice for the 3–1 away win over Partizani Tirana in the 1st qualifying round of UEFA Europa League. On 20 July he provided an assist during the 4–0 win over Beitar Jerusalem in the 2nd qualifying round of UEFA Europa League.

=== Al-Fujairah ===
On 6 August 2017, Kossoko signed a contract with Al-Fujairah for an undisclosed fee, which was to last for two seasons. He scored his first official goal for Al-Fujairah on 5 September 2018, in a 5–2 loss against Al Jazira in a league cup match.

== Honours ==
Botev Plovdiv

- Bulgarian Cup: 2016–17
