= Ventsislav Vasilev =

Bulgarian footballer

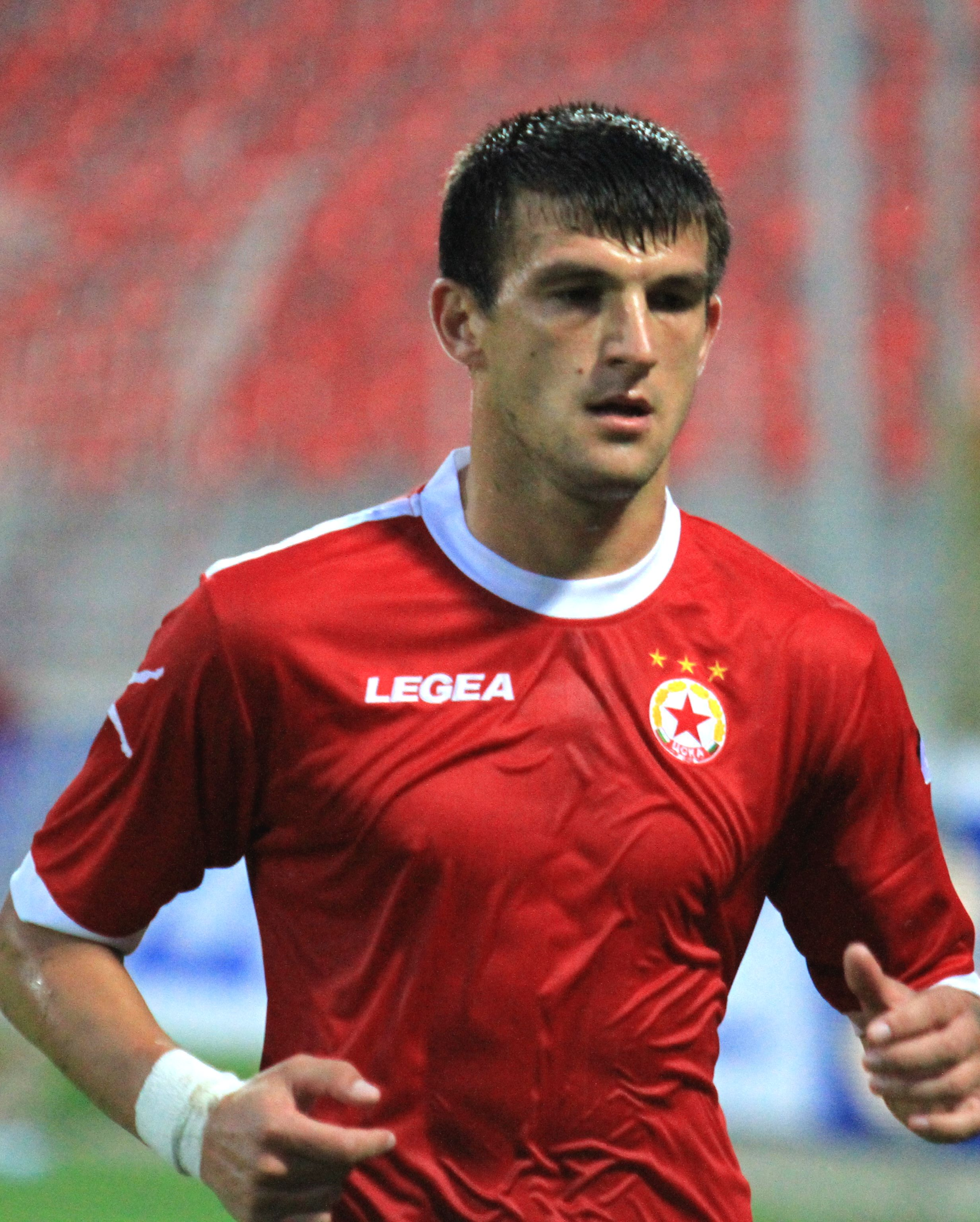

Personal information
- Full name: Ventsislav Ivanov Vasilev
- Date of birth: 8 July 1988 (age 38)
- Place of birth: Pernik, Bulgaria
- Height: 1.83 m (6 ft 0 in)
- Positions: Right back; centre back

Youth career
- Minyor Pernik

Senior career*
Years	Team	Apps	(Gls)
2006–2009	Minyor Pernik	61	(1)
2010–2011	Aris Limassol	40	(0)
2012	Minyor Pernik	25	(1)
2013–2015	CSKA Sofia	51	(4)
2015–2017	Beroe	59	(4)
2017–2019	Etar Veliko Tarnovo	43	(1)
2019	Arda Kardzhali	2	(0)
2019–2021	CSKA 1948	37	(2)
2021–2022	Tsarsko Selo	16	(0)
2022	CSKA 1948	5	(0)
2022	CSKA 1948 II	1	(0)
2022–2023	Minyor Pernik	26	(1)

International career^{‡}
2008	Bulgaria U21	1	(0)
2015–2016	Bulgaria	3	(0)
- * Club domestic league appearances and goals as of 5 June 2023 ‡ National team caps and goals as of 7 June 2016

Ventsislav Ivanov Vasilev (Bulgarian: Венцислав Иванов Василев; born 8 July 1988) is a Bulgarian retired professional footballer who played as a defender.

== Career ==
He started his professional career in his former club Minyor Pernik in 2006. He left the club in 2010 for joining Aris Limassol. He returned to his former club Minyor Pernik in 2011. He was Minyor Pernik captain in his last season 2012–2013.

On 21 December 2012, Vasilev signed a two-and-a-half-year deal with CSKA Sofia.

== International career ==
On 7 February 2015, Vasilev made his first appearance for Bulgaria, in the 0–0 draw with Romania in a non-official friendly match, playing over the course of the entire game. He earned his first cap on 28 March 2015, after coming on as a late substitute in the 2–2 home draw with Italy in a Euro 2016 qualifier.
