= Chico (footballer, born 1988) =

Portuguese footballer

Personal information
- Full name: Francisco Miguel Franco Antunes Gomes
- Date of birth: 2 June 1988 (age 38)
- Place of birth: Torres Vedras, Portugal
- Height: 1.78 m (5 ft 10 in)
- Position: Right-back

Youth career
- 1996–2000: Lourinhanense
- 2000–2005: Sporting CP
- 2005–2007: Académica

Senior career*
Years	Team	Apps	(Gls)
2007	Tourizense	19	(0)
2008	Infesta	3	(0)
2008–2009	Tourizense	21	(0)
2009–2010	Pampilhosa	29	(0)
2010–2011	Torreense	28	(1)
2011–2012	Moreirense	19	(0)
2012–2013	Portimonense	30	(2)
2013–2014	Chernomorets	34	(1)
2014–2015	União Madeira	21	(0)
2016	Aves	17	(1)
2016–2017	Cova Piedade	27	(0)
2017–2019	Zbrojovka	8	(0)
2019–2021	Amora	42	(1)
Total		298	(6)
- * Club domestic league appearances and goals

Francisco Miguel Franco Antunes Gomes (born 2 June 1988), commonly known as Chico, is a Portuguese former professional footballer who played as a right-back.

== Club career ==
Born in Torres Vedras, Lisbon District, Chico spent five of his formative years at Sporting CP, then competed in the third division until the age of 23, in representation of four clubs. He first appeared in the Segunda Liga in the 2011–12 season with Moreirense FC, starting in all of his league appearances to help the team return to the Primeira Liga after a seven-year absence.

On 15 July 2013, after a further campaign in the second tier, with Portimonense SC, Chico signed a contract with Bulgarian club PSFC Chernomorets Burgas following a successful one-week trial. His first top-flight match occurred four days later, when he played the full 90 minutes in a 1–0 home win against PFC Cherno More Varna in the First Professional Football League.

Subsequently, Chico returned to his country's second division, representing in quick succession C.F. União, C.D. Aves and C.D. Cova da Piedade. The 29-year-old moved abroad again in late September 2017, joining Czech First League side FC Zbrojovka Brno as a free agent.
