= Anton Kirov =

Bulgarian footballer

Personal information
- Date of birth: 22 July 1990 (age 36)
- Place of birth: Bulgaria
- Height: 1.75 m (5 ft 9 in)
- Position: Right back

Senior career*
Years	Team	Apps	(Gls)
2009–2011	Chavdar Etropole	27	(1)
2011–2013	Pirin Gotse Delchev	39	(0)
2014	Minyor Pernik	?	(?)
2015	Oborishte	13	(1)
2016–	Minyor Pernik	99	(1)
- * Club domestic league appearances and goals as of 15 March 2022

Anton Kirov (Bulgarian: Антон Киров; born 22 July 1990) is a Bulgarian footballer who plays as a defender.

== Career ==
On 5 May 2017, Kirov was removed from Minyor Pernik's first team but was restored at the beginning of the 2017–18 season.
