= Luc-Christopher Matutu =

French footballer (born 1990)

Personal information
- Date of birth: 8 September 1990 (age 36)
- Place of birth: Paris, France
- Height: 1.80 m (5 ft 11 in)
- Position: Left-back

Senior career*
Years	Team	Apps	(Gls)
2007–2009	VfL Wolfsburg II		
2009–2010	Nantes B		
2010–2011	Brighton & Hove Albion		
2011–2012	Aviron Bayonnais	29	(1)
2012–2013	Beauvais Oise	20	(0)
2013–2014	Lokomotiv Sofia	16	(0)
2014–2018	Sénart-Moissy	67	(6)
- * Club domestic league appearances and goals

Luc-Christopher Matutu (born 8 September 1990) is a French professional footballer who plays as a left-back.
