= Yuliyan Chapaev =

Bulgarian footballer

Personal information
- Full name: Yuliyan Iliyanov Chapaev
- Date of birth: 3 July 1996 (age 30)
- Place of birth: Pleven, Bulgaria
- Height: 1.95 m (6 ft 5 in)
- Position: Centre back

Team information
- Current team: Rilski Sportist
- Number: 3

Youth career
- CSKA Sofia

Senior career*
Years	Team	Apps	(Gls)
2013–2015	CSKA Sofia	0	(0)
2015–2016	RB Leipzig II	2	(0)
2016–2017	Montana	8	(0)
2018–2019	Strumska Slava	19	(1)
2019–2020	FC Yambol	8	(1)
2020–	Rilski Sportist	9	(0)

International career
2014	Bulgaria U19	3	(0)
- * Club domestic league appearances and goals as of 26 October 2021

Yuliyan Chapaev (Bulgarian: Юлиян Чапаев; born 3 July 1996) is a Bulgarian footballer who currently plays as a centre-back for Bulgarian Third League club Rilski Sportist.
