= Jérémy Faug-Porret =

French footballer (born 1987)

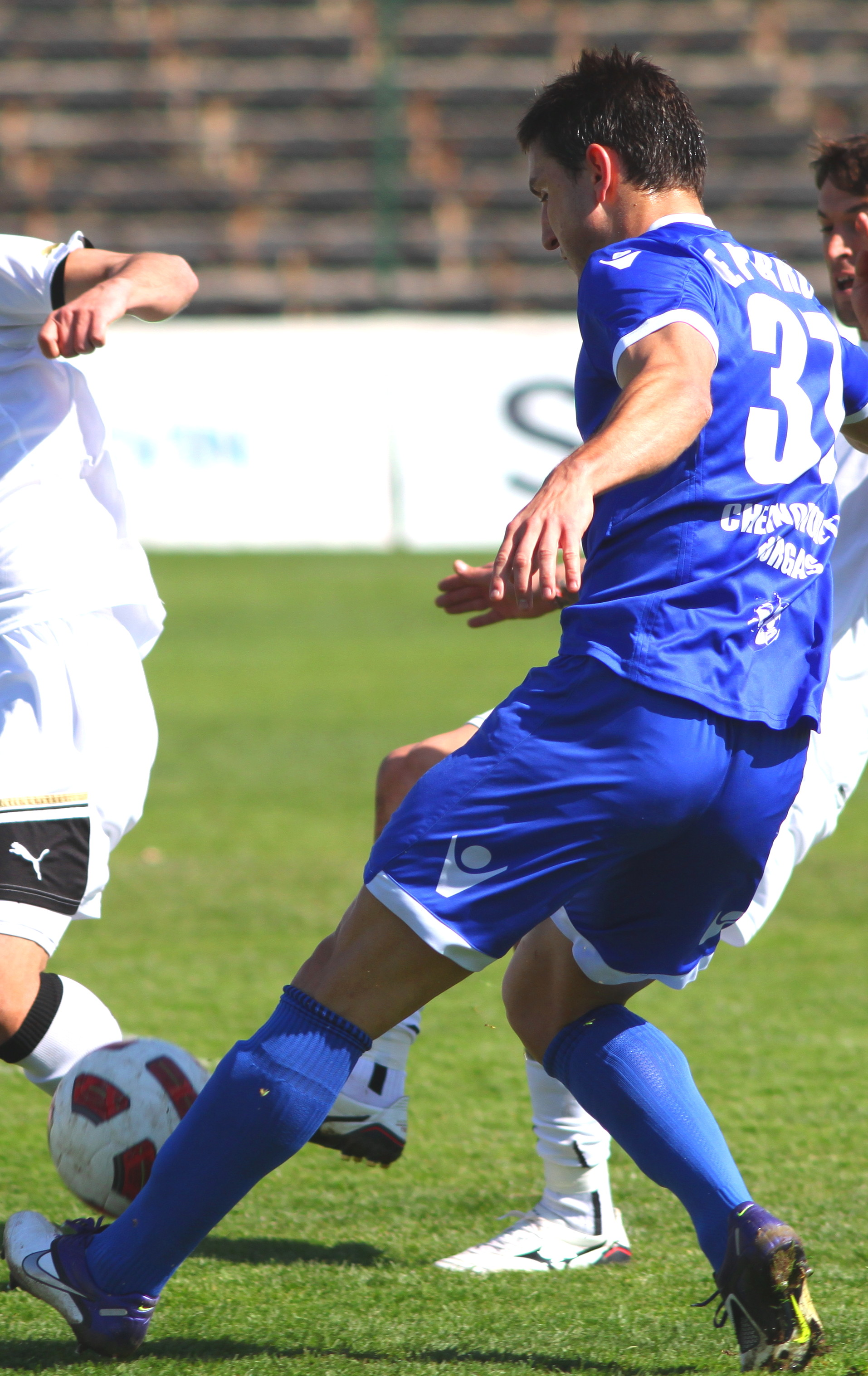

Personal information
- Date of birth: February 4, 1987 (age 39)
- Place of birth: Chambéry, France
- Height: 1.83 m (6 ft 0 in)
- Positions: Left-back; centre-back

Senior career*
Years	Team	Apps	(Gls)
2005–2007	Chambéry		
2007–2010	Vauban Strasbourg	27	(8)
2010–2011	Strasbourg B	24	(2)
2011–2013	Chernomorets Burgas	41	(1)
2013–2014	CSKA Sofia	26	(0)
2015	Botoșani	6	(0)
2015–2016	Petrolul Ploiești	19	(0)
2016–2017	Servette	33	(0)
2017	Aktobe	11	(0)
- * Club domestic league appearances and goals as of 6 November 2017

Jérémy Faug-Porret (born 4 February 1987) is a French professional footballer who most recently played for FC Aktobe as a defender.

== Career ==
Faug-Porret has previously played for Chambéry, Vauban Strasbourg, Strasbourg B, Chernomorets Burgas, CSKA Sofia and Petrolul Ploiești.

In February 2016, Faug-Porret signed for Servette FC. He previously played for Petrolul Ploiești.

On 11 July 2017, Faug-Porret signed for FC Aktobe.

== Career statistics ==
=== Club ===
As of match played 27 May 2017

Appearances and goals by club, season and competition
Club	Season	League		Cup		League Cup		Europe		Other		Total	
Club	Season	Apps	Goals	Apps	Goals	Apps	Goals	Apps	Goals	Apps	Goals	Apps	Goals
Chambéry	2005–06	?	?	–		–		–		–		?	?
Chambéry	2006–07	?	?	–		–		–		–		?	?
Chambéry	Total	?	?	0	0	0	0	0	0	0	0	?	?
Vauban Strasbourg	2007–08	?	?	–		-		–		–		?	?
Vauban Strasbourg	2008–09	?	?	–		-		–		–		?	?
Vauban Strasbourg	2009–10	?	?	–		-		–		–		?	?
Vauban Strasbourg	Total	27	8	0	0	0	0	0	0	0	0	27	8
Strasbourg B	2010–11	24	2	–		–		–		–		24	2
Strasbourg B	Total	24	2	0	0	0	0	0	0	0	0	24	2
Chernomorets Burgas	2011–12	26	1	–		–		–		–		26	1
Chernomorets Burgas	2012–13	15	0	–		–		–		–		15	0
Chernomorets Burgas	Total	41	1	0	0	0	0	0	0	0	0	41	1
CSKA Sofia	2013–14	26	0	2	0	–		–		–		28	0
CSKA Sofia	Total	26	0	2	0	0	0	0	0	0	0	28	0
Botoșani	2014–15	6	0	–		–		–		–		6	0
Botoșani	Total	6	0	0	0	0	0	0	0	0	0	6	0
Petrolul Ploiești	2015–16	19	0	2	0	1	0	–		–		22	0
Petrolul Ploiești	Total	19	0	2	0	1	0	0	0	0	0	22	0
Servette	2015–16	9	0	–		–		–		–		9	0
Servette	2016–17	24	0	1	0	–		–		–		25	0
Servette	Total	33	0	1	0	0	0	0	0	0	0	34	0
Career total		176	11	5	0	1	0	0	0	0	0	182	11
