= Revson =

Raimar may refer to:

- Charles Revson (1906-1975), American businessman and philanthropist who created the cosmetic brand Revlon
- Peter Revson (1939-1974), American race car driver
- Revson (footballer) (born 1992), full name Revson Cordeiro dos Santos, Brazilian footballer
- Revson Fountain, fountain in Manhattan, New York City
