= Guido Di Vanni =

Argentine footballer

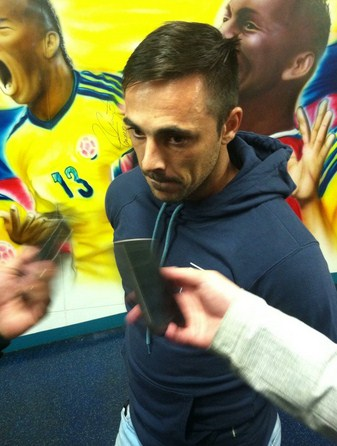

Personal information
- Full name: Guido Sebastián Di Vanni
- Date of birth: 11 June 1988 (age 38)
- Place of birth: Rosario, Argentina
- Height: 1.77 m (5 ft 10 in)
- Position: Forward

Team information
- Current team: Central Córdoba Rosario

Senior career*
Years	Team	Apps	(Gls)
2008–2010	Banfield	11	(0)
2010–2011	Gimnasia de Jujuy	19	(2)
2011–2012	Ferro Carril Oeste	12	(0)
2012	Sportivo Luqueño	39	(10)
2013–2014	Guaraní	16	(0)
2014	→ CSKA Sofia (loan)	7	(0)
2014–2016	Sportivo Luqueño	12	(3)
2016	Santa Fe	6	(0)
2016–2017	Sportivo Luqueño	54	(15)
2018–2019	Deportivo Capiatá	33	(8)
2019	Unión Comercio	11	(1)
2020	12 de Octubre	11	(0)
- * Club domestic league appearances and goals as of 11 September 2020

Guido Sebastián Di Vanni (born 11 June 1988 in Rosario) is an Argentine footballer currently playing for Central Córdoba Rosario as a forward. He is nicknamed "Ramses".

== Honours ==
Banfield

- Primera División: 2009 Apertura

== See also ==
- List of foreign footballers in Paraguay
- Players and Records in Paraguayan Football
