= Jackson Mendy =

French-Senegalese footballer (born 1987)

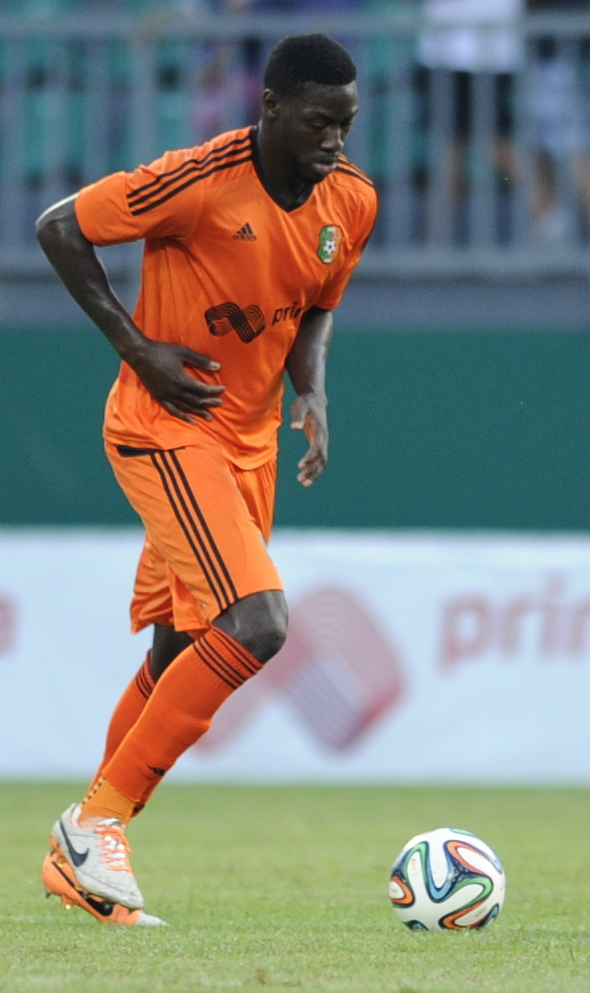
- Mendy playing for Litex Lovech in 2014

Personal information
- Date of birth: 25 May 1987 (age 39)
- Place of birth: Mont-Saint-Aignan, France
- Height: 1.92 m (6 ft 4 in)
- Positions: Centre back; left back

Youth career
- Auxerre

Senior career*
| Years | Team | Apps | (Gls) |
| 2005–2006 | US Quevilly | 14 | (0) |
| 2006–2007 | Rennes B | 23 | (0) |
| 2007 | Paris FC | 10 | (0) |
| 2008–2009 | Hansa Rostock II | 27 | (0) |
| 2009 | SC Freiburg II | 27 | (1) |
| 2009–2010 | SC Freiburg | 6 | (0) |
| 2010–2011 | Grenoble | 28 | (2) |
| 2011 | AC Ajaccio | 4 | (0) |
| 2012–2013 | Levadiakos | 43 | (1) |
| 2013–2014 | CSKA Sofia | 38 | (0) |
| 2014–2015 | Litex Lovech | 15 | (1) |
| 2015 | Omonia | 2 | (0) |
| 2016–2018 | Levadiakos | 47 | (1) |
| 2018–2019 | Schaffhausen | 26 | (0) |
| 2019–2021 | Boulogne | 22 | (1) |

International career
| 2010 | Senegal | 2 | (0) |
- * Club domestic league appearances and goals as of 22 January 2021

Jackson Mendy (born 25 May 1987) is a professional footballer who plays as a defender. Born in France, he played for the Senegal national team internationally.

== Club career ==
Mendy was born in Mont-Saint-Aignan, France. He started his career in the training centre of Auxerre, moving first to Quevilly, before signing a one-season professional trainee contract with Rennes in June 2006. A year later, having not imposed himself, he left Rennes for Paris FC.

After one season at Paris FC, Mendy moved to Germany, first with Hansa Rostock, where he played for the B team, and then with SC Freiburg. He left the club in July 2010, having a trial at English Championship team Middlesbrough before signing a two-year deal with French side Grenoble Foot 38. He stayed just one season, due to Grenoble filing for bankruptcy at the end of the 2010–11 Ligue 2 campaign. On 31 July 2011, he signed a one-year contract with Ligue 1 side AC Ajaccio.

Mendy made his Ligue 1 debut on 17 September 2011, as a second half substitute in the match at Nice. After making just three Ligue 1 appearances, he moved to Super LeagueGreece side Levadiakos in January 2012, signing a two-year deal. He was released from his contract at the end of the 2012–13 season, and joined Bulgarian side CSKA Sofia. He spent a second season in Bulgaria with Litex Lovech in 2014–15 before a six-month spell in Cyprus with Omonia.

In January 2016 Mendy returned to Levadiakos for a second spell, spending two-and-a-half seasons with the club. In July 2018 he signed a two-year deal with Swiss side FC Schaffhausen. Having been used most often as a substitute in the second half of the 2018–19 season, he signed for US Boulogne.

== International career ==
On 11 May 2010, he earned his first call-up for the Senegal national football team for a friendly match against Denmark on 27 May 2010.
