= Nemanja Milisavljević =

Serbian footballer

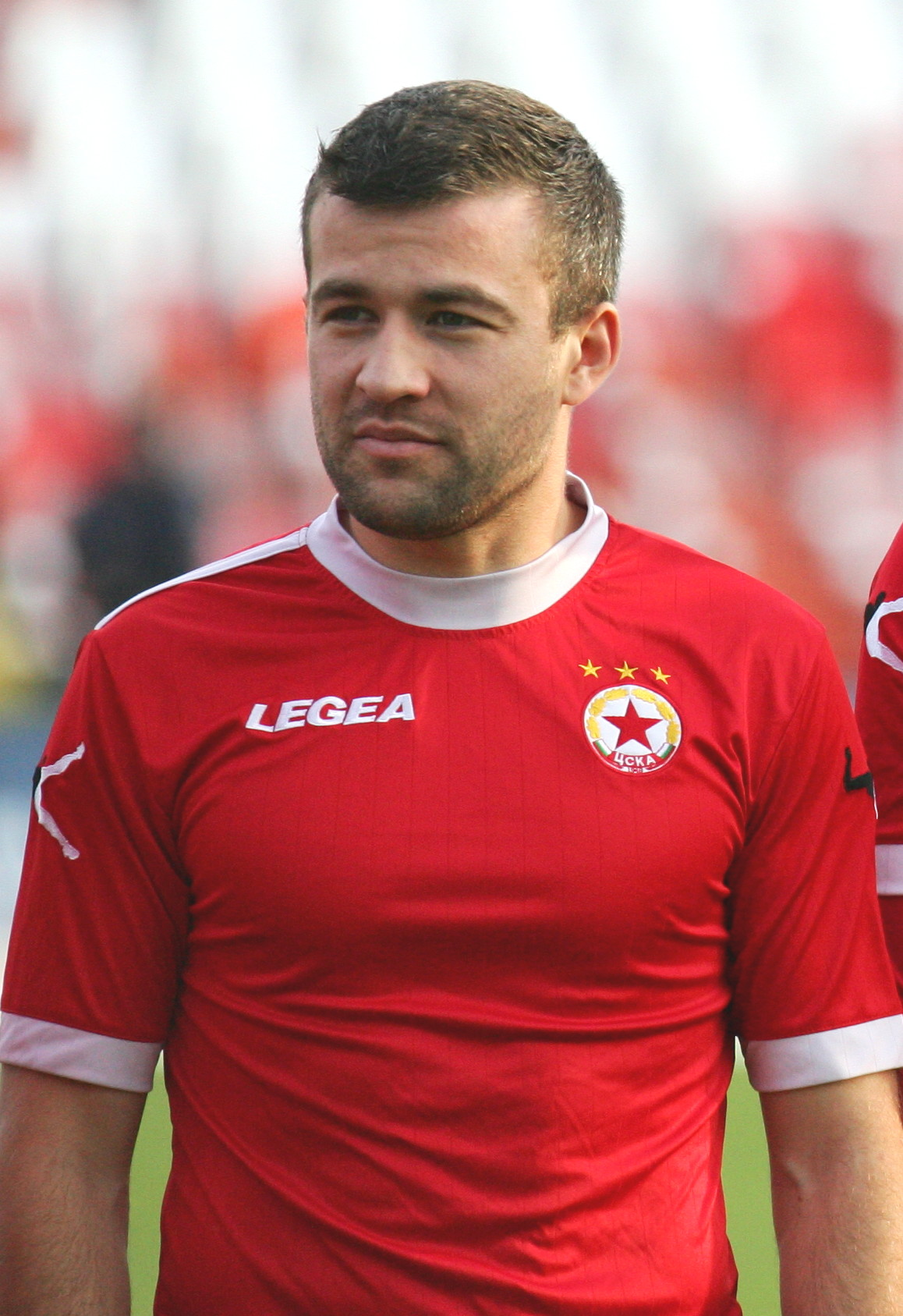
- Milisavljević with CSKA Sofia in 2013

Personal information
- Date of birth: 1 November 1984 (age 42)
- Place of birth: Brus, SFR Yugoslavia
- Height: 1.76 m (5 ft 9 in)
- Position: Winger

Senior career*
Years	Team	Apps	(Gls)
2002–2005	Radnički Niš	57	(4)
2005–2006	OFK Beograd	2	(0)
2006	→ Radnički Niš (loan)	17	(5)
2006	Radnički Niš	16	(1)
2007–2008	Rabotnički	25	(4)
2008	Vardar	12	(2)
2009–2012	Vaslui	79	(2)
2012	Rapid București	18	(0)
2013	Ludogorets Razgrad	6	(0)
2013–2015	CSKA Sofia	57	(4)
2015–2016	Beroe Stara Zagora	40	(3)
2017	Kopaonik Brus		
2017–2018	Napredak Kruševac	20	(0)
2018–2023	Trayal Kruševac	88	(6)

International career
2003	Serbia and Montenegro U19	3	(0)
- * Club domestic league appearances and goals as of 25 June 2023

Nemanja Milisavljević (Serbian Cyrillic: Немања Милисављевић; born 1 November 1984) is a Serbian retired footballer who played as a winger.

== Club career ==
Born in Brus, Milisavljević made his first senior appearances with Radnički Niš in 2002. He spent three seasons at the club, before transferring to OFK Beograd in the summer of 2005. Six months later, Milisavljević returned to Radnički Niš.

In the 2007 winter transfer window, Milisavljević moved abroad to Macedonia and joined Rabotnički. He helped them win the double in the 2007–08 season. Afterwards, Milisavljević switched to fellow Macedonian club Vardar.

In the 2009 winter transfer window, Milisavljević was transferred to Romanian side Vaslui. He spent the next three and a half years there, before moving to fellow Liga I club Rapid București. In early 2013, Milisavljević signed with Bulgarian champions Ludogorets Razgrad. He also played for CSKA Sofia and Beroe Stara Zagora.

In June 2017, Milisavljević signed a one-year deal with Napredak Kruševac. He moved to crosstown rivals Trayal Kruševac in June 2018.

== International career ==
In 2003, Milisavljević represented Serbia and Montenegro at under-19 level.

== Honours ==
Rabotnički

- Macedonian First League: 2007–08
- Macedonian Cup: 2007–08

CS Vaslui

- Liga I runner-up: 2011–12

Ludogorets Razgrad

- Bulgaria A Group: 2012–13
