= Jeroen Lumu =

Dutch footballer

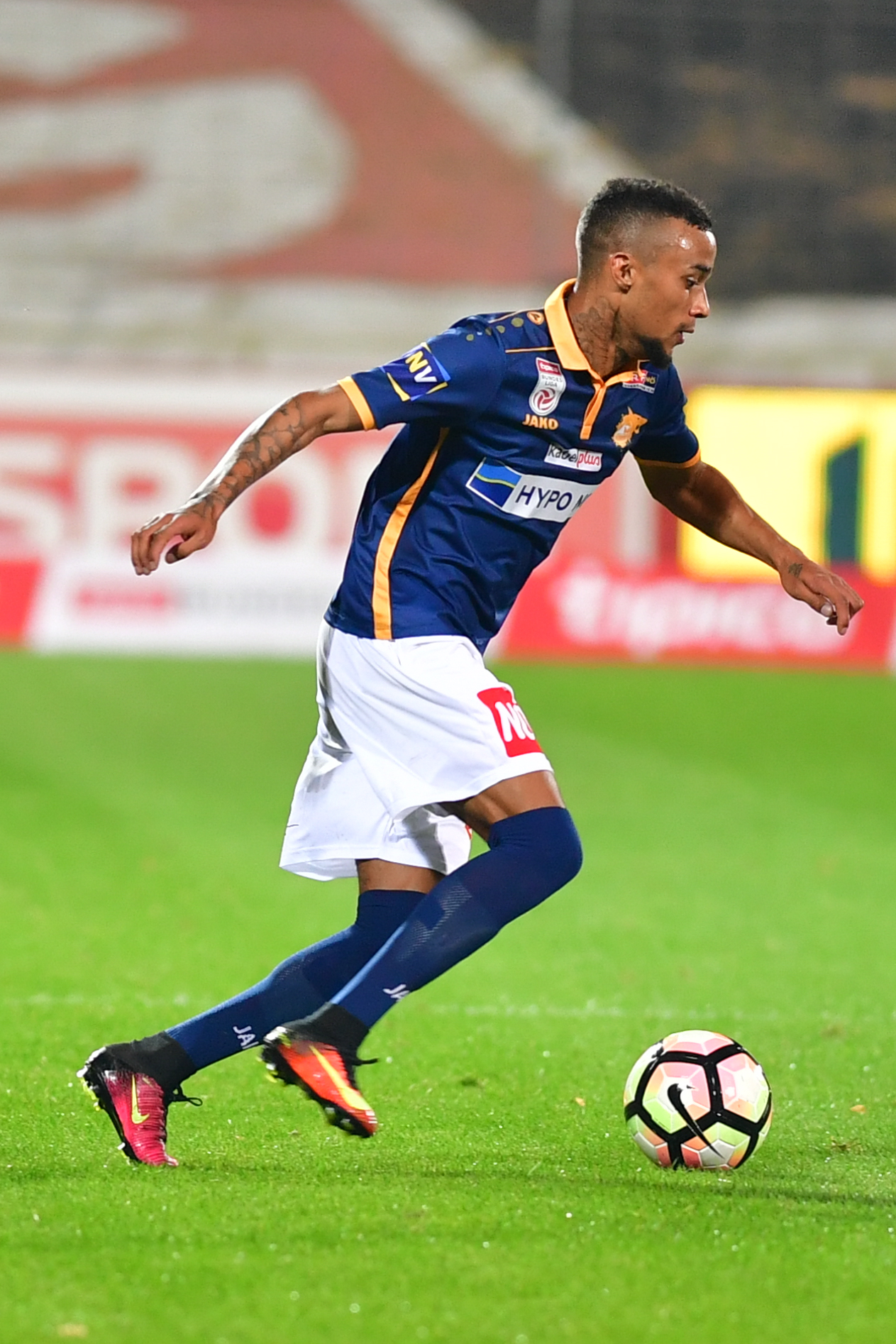

Personal information
- Full name: Jeroen Lombe Lumu
- Date of birth: 27 May 1995 (age 31)
- Place of birth: Breda, Netherlands
- Height: 1.78 m (5 ft 10 in)
- Positions: Winger; forward

Youth career
- 2008–2011: Willem II

Senior career*
| Years | Team | Apps | (Gls) |
| 2011–2013 | Willem II | 28 | (3) |
| 2014 | Ludogorets Razgrad | 11 | (1) |
| 2014 | SC Heerenveen | 1 | (0) |
| 2015–2016 | FC Dordrecht | 23 | (5) |
| 2016–2017 | SKN St. Pölten | 12 | (2) |
| 2017 | Samsunspor | 13 | (0) |
| 2017–2018 | Delhi Dynamos | 17 | (0) |
| 2018 | Petrolul Ploiești | 11 | (2) |
| 2019–2020 | Arouca | 8 | (2) |
| 2020–2021 | FC Saburtalo | 6 | (1) |
| 2021 | Floriana | 3 | (0) |
| 2021 | Marumo Gallants | | |
| 2021–2022 | Omonia Aradippou | | |
| 2022 | Poros | | |
| 2023 | Nestos | | |
| 2024 | Miltiadis Pyrgos Trifilia | | |
| 2024 | Bruno's Magpies | | |

International career
| 2011–2012 | Netherlands U17 | 15 | (3) |
| 2012–2013 | Netherlands U18 | 1 | (0) |
- * Club domestic league appearances and goals as of 10 February 2021

Jeroen Lombe Lumu (born 27 May 1995) is a Dutch footballer who plays as a winger.

== Career ==
=== Willem II ===
Born in Breda to a DR Congolese father and a Dutch mother of Javanese Surinamese descent, Lumu began his football career at Willem II. He made his debut on 16 January 2012, when he was just 16 years old, coming on as a second-half substitute in a 3–1 away loss against MVV Maastricht in the Eerste Divisie.

Lumu made his Eredivisie debut on 15 September 2012, coming on as a 71st-minute substitute against Twente. His goal thirteen minutes later earned him the distinction within the club while in the Eredivisie of being the youngest goal scorer.

=== Ludogorets Razgrad ===
On 8 January 2014, Ludogorets Razgrad announced they had reached an agreement to sign Lumu from Willem II for an undisclosed fee, rumoured to be a €150,000. On 9 January, he signed a long-term contract. Lumu scored on his debut in a friendly game against Pirin Blagoevgrad on 16 January, netting the fourth in a 5–1 win. He also netted an important last-minute goal on 30 April against CSKA Sofia to help his team to a 1–0 home win, almost clinching a third successive A PFG title for Ludogorets.

=== SC Heerenveen ===
On 21 August 2014, it was announced that Lumu had signed a one-year deal with Eredivisie side SC Heerenveen. Lumu made his debut for Heerenveen in the home match against Excelsior on 23 August 2014, coming on as a 70th-minute substitute for Norwegian midfielder Morten Thorsby.

=== Later career ===
On 13 September 2017, it was announced that Indian Super League (ISL) side Delhi Dynamos have completed the signing of Jeroen Lumu from Turkish side Samsunspor. The young winger became the seventh foreign signing of the Delhi-based club.

On 24 January 2019, Lumu joined the Portuguese club F.C. Arouca.

In July 2024, after several years of playing for lower-tier Greek clubs, Lumu signed with Gamma Ethniki club Miltiadis Pyrgos Trifilia. After committing an according to sources "serious disciplinary offense", he was released in September 2024.

== Career statistics ==
As of match played on 2 March 2018

| Club | Season | League | | | Cup | | Continental | | Total | |
| Club | Season | Division | Apps | Goals | Apps | Goals | Apps | Goals | Apps | Goals |
|---|---|---|---|---|---|---|---|---|---|---|
| Willem II | 2011–12 | Eerste Divisie | 8 | 1 | 0 | 0 | — | | 8 | 1 |
| Willem II | 2012–13 | Eredivisie | 12 | 1 | 1 | 0 | — | | 13 | 1 |
| Willem II | 2013–14 | Eerste Divisie | 8 | 1 | 1 | 0 | — | | 9 | 1 |
| Willem II | Total | | 28 | 3 | 2 | 0 | — | | 30 | 3 |
| Ludogorets Razgard | 2013–14 | A Group | 11 | 1 | 3 | 1 | 3 (Note: Appearances in UEFA Europa League) | 0 | 17 | 2 |
| Ludogorets Razgard | 2014–15 | A Group | 0 | 0 | 0 | 0 | 1 (Note: Appearances in UEFA Champions League) | 0 | 1 | 0 |
| Ludogorets Razgard | Total | | 11 | 1 | 3 | 1 | 4 | 0 | 18 | 2 |
| Heerenveen | 2014–15 | Eredivisie | 1 | 0 | 0 | 0 | — | | 1 | 0 |
| FC Dordrecht | 2015–16 | Eredivisie | 1 | 0 | 0 | 0 | — | | 1 | 0 |
| SKN St. Pölten | 2016–17 | Austrian Bundesliga | 12 | 2 | 1 | 0 | — | | 13 | 2 |
| Samsunspor | 2016–17 | TFF First League | 13 | 0 | 0 | 0 | — | | 13 | 0 |
| Delhi Dynamos | 2017–18 | Indian Super League | 17 | 0 | 0 | 0 | — | | 17 | 0 |
| Career total | | | 229 | 22 | 18 | 1 | 14 | 0 | 261 | 23 |

== Honours ==
=== Club ===
Ludogorets Razgrad

- Bulgarian A Group: 2013–14
- Bulgarian Cup: 2013–14
- Bulgarian Supercup: 2014

=== International ===
Netherlands

- UEFA European Under-17 Football Championship: 2012
