= 2015–16 PFC Ludogorets Razgrad season =

Ludogorets Razgrad
2015–16 season
- Chairman: Aleksandar Aleksandrov
- Manager: Georgi Dermendzhiev
- A Group: 1st
- Bulgarian Cup: Second round (vs. Lokomotiv Gorna Oryahovitsa)
- Supercup: Runners-up
- Champions League: Second Qualifying Round (vs. Milsami Orhei)
- Top goalscorer: League: Claudiu Keșerü (15); All: Claudiu Keșerü (15)
Home colours	Away colours

The 2015–16 season was Ludogorets Razgrad's fifth season in A Football Group. They successfully defended their title, winning the championship for a fifth consecutive and overall time. However, Ludogorets Razgrad lost the second round in the Bulgarian Cup, lost the SuperCup final and failed to qualify in the UEFA Champions League groups, losing in both legs of the second qualifying round to Milsami Orhei.

== Squad ==
As of match played 27 May 2016

No.	Name	Nationality	Position	Date of birth (age)	Signed from	Signed in	Contract ends	Apps.	Goals
Goalkeepers
1	Milan Borjan	(Canada)	GK	23 October 1987 (aged 28)	Radnički Niš	2016		12	0
21	Vladislav Stoyanov	(Bulgaria)	GK	8 June 1987 (aged 28)	Sheriff Tiraspol	2013		124	0
31	Georgi Argilashki	(Bulgaria)	GK	13 June 1991 (aged 24)	Brestnik 1948	2011		9	0
91	Ivan Čvorović	(Bulgaria)	GK	15 June 1985 (aged 30)	Minyor Pernik	2012		36	0
Defenders
3	Teynur Marem	(Bulgaria)	DF	24 September 1994 (aged 21)	Sliven 2000	2012		1	0
4	Cicinho	(Brazil)	DF	26 December 1988 (aged 27)	Santos	2015		12	0
6	Natanael	(Brazil)	DF	25 December 1990 (aged 25)	Athletico Paranaense	2015		25	0
16	Brayan Angulo	(Colombia)	DF	2 November 1989 (aged 26)	Granada	2014		35	1
19	Aleksandar Vasilev	(Bulgaria)	DF	27 April 1995 (aged 21)	Kaliakra Kavarna	2014		19	1
24	Preslav Petrov	(Bulgaria)	DF	1 May 1995 (aged 21)	Vidima-Rakovski	2014		2	0
25	Yordan Minev	(Bulgaria)	DF	14 October 1980 (aged 35)	Botev Plovdiv	2011		149	1
27	Cosmin Moți	(Romania)	DF	3 December 1984 (aged 31)	Dinamo București	2012		143	15
37	Ventsislav Kerchev	(Bulgaria)	DF	2 June 1997 (aged 18)	Youth Team	2014		24	2
55	Georgi Terziev	(Bulgaria)	DF	18 April 1992 (aged 24)	Chernomorets Burgas	2013		62	2
77	Vitinha	(Portugal)	DF	11 February 1986 (aged 30)	Concordia Chiajna	2012		50	0
83	Hristo Popadiyn	(Bulgaria)	DF	6 January 1994 (aged 22)	Lokomotiv Mezdra	2015		3	0
Midfielders
8	Lucas Sasha	(Brazil)	MF	1 March 1990 (aged 26)	Hapoel Tel Aviv	2015		24	2
12	Anicet Abel	(Madagascar)	MF	13 March 1990 (aged 26)	Botev Plovdiv	2014		55	4
13	Veselin Lyubomirov	(Bulgaria)	MF	2 February 1996 (aged 20)	Pirin Blagoevgrad	2012		1	0
18	Svetoslav Dyakov	(Bulgaria)	MF	31 May 1984 (aged 31)	Lokomotiv Sofia	2012		174	9
30	Andrei Prepeliță	(Romania)	MF	8 December 1985 (aged 30)	Steaua București	2015		26	1
34	Oleg Dimitrov	(Bulgaria)	MF	6 March 1996 (aged 20)	Youth Team	2015		2	0
38	Kristiyan Kitov	(Bulgaria)	MF	14 October 1996 (aged 19)	CSKA Sofia	2012		3	0
45	Ivaylo Klimentov	(Bulgaria)	MF	3 February 1998 (aged 18)	Youth Team	2015		1	0
80	Denislav Aleksandrov	(Bulgaria)	MF	19 July 1997 (aged 18)	Youth Team	2014		4	0
84	Marcelinho	(Bulgaria)	MF	24 August 1984 (aged 31)	Bragantino	2011		182	52
88	Wanderson	(Brazil)	MF	2 January 1988 (aged 28)	Portuguesa	2014		67	20
92	Jody Lukoki	(Democratic Republic of the Congo)	MF	15 November 1992 (aged 23)	PEC Zwolle	2015		22	0
95	Borimir Karamfilov	(Bulgaria)	MF	13 May 1995 (aged 21)	Botev Plovdiv	2015		1	2
98	Svetoslav Kovachev	(Bulgaria)	MF	14 March 1998 (aged 18)	Youth Team	2015		2	2
Forwards
11	Juninho Quixadá	(Brazil)	FW	12 December 1985 (aged 30)	Bragantino	2011		129	34
17	Tsvetelin Chunchukov	(Bulgaria)	FW	26 December 1994 (aged 21)	Botev Plovdiv	2015		5	0
22	Jonathan Cafú	(Brazil)	FW	10 July 1991 (aged 24)	São Paulo	2015		23	7
28	Claudiu Keșerü	(Romania)	FW	2 December 1986 (aged 29)	Al-Gharafa	2015		27	15
71	Yanaki Smirnov	(Bulgaria)	FW	20 December 1992 (aged 23)	Lokomotiv GO	2015		3	1
93	Vura	(Netherlands)	FW	24 July 1993 (aged 22)	Willem II	2013		105	26
Players away on loan
99	Hamza Younés	(Tunisia)	FW	16 April 1986 (aged 30)	Botev Plovdiv	2014		27	5
Players who left during the season
7	Mihail Aleksandrov	(Bulgaria)	MF	11 June 1989 (aged 26)	Akademik Sofia	2010		150	22
15	Aleksandar Aleksandrov	(Bulgaria)	DF	13 April 1986 (aged 30)	Cherno More Varna	2014		38	0
45	Zlatko Bonev	(Bulgaria)	MF	9 June 1994 (aged 21)	Marek Dupnitsa	2015		1	0

== Transfers ==
=== Summer ===
In: Note: Flags indicate national team as defined under FIFA eligibility rules; some limited exceptions apply. Players may hold more than one non-FIFA nationality.

No.	Pos.	Nation	Player
1	GK	CAN	Milan Borjan (from (Serbia) Radnički Niš)
3	DF	BUL	Teynur Marem (loan return from (Bulgaria) Haskovo)
4	DF	BRA	Cicinho (from (Brazil) Santos)
8	MF	BRA	Lucas Sasha (from (Israel) Hapoel Tel Aviv)
6	DF	BRA	Natanael (from (Brazil) Atlético Paranaense)
17	FW	BUL	Tsvetelin Chunchukov (from (Bulgaria) Botev Plovdiv)
22	FW	BRA	Jonathan Cafu (from (Brazil) São Paulo)
28	FW	ROU	Claudiu Keșerü (from (Qatar) Al-Gharafa)
30	MF	ROU	Andrei Prepeliță (from (Romania) Steaua București)
92	MF	COD	Jody Lukoki (from (Netherlands) PEC Zwolle)

Out: Note: Flags indicate national team as defined under FIFA eligibility rules; some limited exceptions apply. Players may hold more than one non-FIFA nationality.

No.	Pos.	Nation	Player
5	DF	FRA	Alexandre Barthe (to (Switzerland) Grasshoppers)
8	MF	POR	Espinho (to (Spain) Málaga)
9	FW	SLO	Roman Bezjak (to (Croatia) HNK Rijeka)
10	MF	COL	Sebastián Hernández
17	MF	ESP	Dani Abalo (to (Turkey) Sivasspor)
23	MF	BUL	Hristo Zlatinski (to (Romania) CS Universitatea Craiova)
80	DF	BRA	Júnior Caiçara (to (Germany) Schalke 04)
99	FW	TUN	Hamza Younés (loan to (Iran) Tractor Sazi)

=== Winter ===
In: Note: Flags indicate national team as defined under FIFA eligibility rules; some limited exceptions apply. Players may hold more than one non-FIFA nationality.

No.	Pos.	Nation	Player

Out: Note: Flags indicate national team as defined under FIFA eligibility rules; some limited exceptions apply. Players may hold more than one non-FIFA nationality.

No.	Pos.	Nation	Player
7	MF	BUL	Mihail Aleksandrov (to (Poland) Legia Warsaw)
15	DF	BUL	Aleksandar Aleksandrov (to (Bulgaria) Levski Sofia)}
99	FW	TUN	Hamza Younés (loan to (Romania) Concordia Chiajna, previously on loan to (Iran) Tractor Sazi)

== Friendlies ==
28 June 2015	Ludogorets Razgrad (Bulgaria)	3 – 2	(Russia) Krasnodar	Austria
EEST (UTC+3)	Marchenko 15' (o.g.); Quixadá 20'; Angulo 30'	Summary	Batyutin 62'; Ari 67'

== Competitions ==
=== Bulgarian Supercup ===
12 August 2015	Ludogorets Razgrad	0 – 1	Cherno More	Burgas
20:00 EEST (UTC+3)	Dyakov (yellow card) 28'; Juninho (yellow card) 40'; Sasha (yellow card) 45+4'; Marcelinho (yellow card) 64'; Cafu (yellow card) 90+2'	Summary	Bourabia 15' (yellow card) 65'; Coulibaly (yellow card) 42'; Coureur (yellow card) 51'; Klok (yellow card) 54'; Stanchev (yellow card) 58'; Čanović (yellow card) 63'; Palankov (yellow card) 90+3'	Stadium: Lazur Stadium; Attendance: 1,800; Referee: Stanislav Todorov

=== A Football Group ===
==== League table ====
Pos	Team	Pld	W	D	L	GF	GA	GD	Pts	Qualification or relegation
1	Ludogorets Razgrad (C)	32	21	7	4	55	21	+34	70	Qualification for the Champions League second qualifying round
2	Levski Sofia	32	16	8	8	36	18	+18	56	Qualification for the Europa League second qualifying round
3	Beroe	32	14	11	7	37	27	+10	53	Qualification for the Europa League first qualifying round
4	Slavia Sofia	32	14	7	11	36	29	+7	49 (Note: Slavia Sofia ahead of Lokomotiv Plovdiv on head-to-head record; Slavia Sofia–Lokomotiv Plovdiv 3–0, Lokomotiv Plovdiv–Slavia Sofia 2–0, Slavia Sofia–Lokomotiv Plovdiv 3–0, Lokomotiv Plovdiv–Slavia Sofia 3–1.)	Qualification for the Europa League first qualifying round
5	Lokomotiv Plovdiv	32	15	4	13	40	45	−5	49	

Source: Bulgarian Football Association, Soccerway
Rules for classification: 1) Points; 2) Head-to-head points; 3) Head-to-head goal difference; 4) Head-to-head goals scored; 5) Head-to-head away goals scored (only if two teams); 6) Goal difference; 7) Goals scored; 8) Fairplay ranking; 9) Draw.
(C) Champions

==== Results summary ====
Overall								Home						Away					
Pld	W	D	L	GF	GA	GD	Pts	W	D	L	GF	GA	GD	W	D	L	GF	GA	GD
32	21	7	4	54	21	+33	70	12	3	1	30	10	+20	9	4	3	24	11	+13

Last updated: 1 June 2016.
Source: Soccerway

==== Results by round ====
Round	1	2	3	4	5	6	7	8	9	10	11	12	13	14	15	16	17	18	19	20	21	22	23	24	25	26	27	28	29	30	31	32	33	34	35	36
Ground	A	A	H	A	H	A	H	A	H	H	H	A	H	A	H	A	H	A	A	A	H	A	H	A	H	A	H	H	H	A	H	A	H	A	H	A
Result	-	W	W	D	W	W	D	D	W	-	D	D	W	L	D	W	W	W	-	W	W	W	W	W	W	W	W	-	W	D	W	L	W	W	L	L
Position	9	5	3	4	3	1	1	1	2	2	2	3	2	3	4	3	3	2	1	1	1	1	1	1	1	1	1	1	1	1	1	1	1	1	1	1

Source: Soccerway
A = Away; H = Home; W = Win; D = Draw; L = Loss

==== Results ====
18 July 2015 1	Litex Lovech	Annulled^{1}	Ludogorets Razgrad	Lovech
21:00 EEST (UTC+3)	Asprilla 26'; Boumal (yellow card) 43'; Malinov (yellow card) 71'; Viana (yellow card) 82' (yellow-red card) 87' (goal) 86'; Goranov (yellow card) 83'	Summary	Marcelinho (yellow card) 41'; Chunchukov (yellow card) 55'; A.Aleksandrov (yellow card) 65'; Dyakov (yellow card) 69'; Moți (yellow card) 77'; Angulo (yellow card) 83'	Stadium: Lovech Stadium; Attendance: 1,300; Referee: Stanislav Todorov

26 July 2015 2	Cherno More	2 – 3	Ludogorets Razgrad	Varna
18:30 EEST (UTC+3)	Georgiev (yellow card) 26'; Ginho (yellow card) 44'; Stanchev (yellow card) 54'; Sténio (yellow card) 56' (goal) 75'; Bourabia (yellow card) 58'; Coureur 90+5'	Summary	Marcelinho 6'; Sasha (yellow card) 46'; Minev (yellow card) 56'; Wanderson 63' (yellow card) 82'; Stanchev 89' (o.g.)	Stadium: Ticha Stadium; Attendance: 3,400; Referee: Georgi Yordanov

1 August 2015 3	Ludogorets Razgrad	2 – 0	Levski Sofia	Razgrad
21:00 EEST (UTC+3)	Dyakov (yellow card) 31'; Cicinho (yellow card) 36'; Sasha (yellow card) 56'; Marcelinho 61' (yellow card) 84'; Quixadá (yellow card) 81'; Vura 86'; Moți (yellow card) 90'	Summary	B.Tsonev (yellow card) 18'; Kostadinov (yellow card) 28'; Mahmudov (yellow card) 43'; Ivanov (yellow card) 45'; Orachev (yellow card) 50'; Karner (yellow card) 66'; Jorgačević (yellow card) 75'	Stadium: Ludogorets Arena; Attendance: 5,600; Referee: Ivaylo Stoyanov

7 August 2015 4	Montana	1 – 1	Ludogorets Razgrad	Montana
17:30 EEST (UTC+3)	Iliev 6'; Genchev (yellow card) 24'; Mihov (yellow card) 42'; Dosti (yellow card) 90+2'	Summary	Cicinho (yellow card) 31' (yellow-red card) 53'; Dyakov (yellow card) 44'; Moți 49' (pen.); Marcelinho (yellow card) 81'	Stadium: Ogosta Stadium; Attendance: 3,600; Referee: Nikolay Yordanov

16 August 2015 5	Ludogorets Razgrad	1 – 0	Lokomotiv Plovdiv	Razgrad
20:00 EEST (UTC+3)	Vasilev (yellow card) 37'; Marcelinho 42'; Cicinho (yellow card) 61'; Stoyanov (yellow card) 90+1'	Summary	Baldovaliev (yellow card) 19'; Dufau (yellow card) 40'; Karagaren (yellow card) 70'	Stadium: Ludogorets Arena; Attendance: 2,000; Referee: Stanislav Stavrov

21 August 2015 6	Pirin Blagoevgrad	0 – 3	Ludogorets Razgrad	Blagoevgrad
20:00 EEST (UTC+3)	Popev (yellow card) 23'; Bengyuzov (yellow card) 26'	Summary	Vasilev 21'; Marcelinho (yellow card) 27'; Keșerü 35', 61'	Stadium: Hristo Botev Stadium; Attendance: 4,000; Referee: Alexandre Kostadinov

28 August 2015 7	Ludogorets Razgrad	1 – 1	Slavia Sofia	Razgrad
20:00 EEST (UTC+3)	Vura 56'; Terziev (yellow card) 79'; M.Aleksandrov (yellow card) 84'; Moți (yellow card) 90+4'	Summary	Martinov (yellow card) 17'; Pirgov (yellow card) 66'; Diego (yellow card) 73'; Karachanakov 87' (yellow card) 88'; Stoev (yellow card) 90+1'	Stadium: Ludogorets Arena; Attendance: 3,000; Referee: Georgie Yordanov

12 September 2015 8	Beroe	0 – 0	Ludogorets Razgrad	Stara Zagora
20:00 EEST (UTC+3)	Vasilev (yellow card) 32'; Tom (yellow card) 35'	Summary	Dyakov (yellow card) 31' (yellow-red card) 41'; Sasha (yellow card) 56'	Stadium: Beroe Stadium; Attendance: 3,800; Referee: Tasko Taskov

19 September 2015 9	Ludogorets Razgrad	2 – 1	Botev Plovdiv	Razgrad
20:00 EEST (UTC+3)	Keșerü 15', 83'; Moți (yellow card) 45'; Marcelinho (yellow card) 88'	Summary	Gamakov (yellow card) 13'; Baltanov 55'; Kifouéti (yellow card) 77'; Starokin (yellow card) 79'; Marin (yellow card) 86'; Zlatkov (yellow card) 90'	Stadium: Ludogorets Arena; Attendance: 2,800; Referee: Stanislav Stavrov

26 September 2015 10	Ludogorets Razgrad	Annulled^{1}	Litex Lovech	Razgrad
20:00 EEST (UTC+3)	Cafu 27'; Prepeliță (yellow card) 38'; Minev (yellow card) 67'; Natanael (yellow card) 90'	Summary	Arsénio 23'; Dos Reis (yellow card) 40'; Nedyalkov (yellow card) 45+1'; Popov (red card) 46'; Rojas (yellow card) 90'; Vinícius (yellow card) 90+1'; Kolev (yellow card) 90+2'	Stadium: Ludogorets Arena; Attendance: 3,900; Referee: Tasko Taskov

3 October 2015 11	Ludogorets Razgrad	1 – 1	Cherno More	Razgrad
20:00 EEST (UTC+3)	Marcelinho (yellow card) 12'; Keșerü 55'; Minev (yellow card) 58'; Terziev (yellow card) 90+4'	Summary	Petkov (yellow card) 13'; Coulibaly (yellow card) 27'; Coureur 46'; Georgiev (yellow card) 68'; Bijev (yellow card) 82'; Klok (yellow card) 88'	Stadium: Ludogorets Arena; Attendance: 1,600; Referee: Nikolay Yordanov

18 October 2015 12	Levski Sofia	1 – 1	Ludogorets Razgrad	Sofia
20:00 EEST (UTC+3)	Milanov 39'; Kraev (yellow card) 59'; Procházka (yellow card) 69'	Summary	Marcelinho (yellow card) 3'; Keșerü 60'; Dyakov (yellow card) 67'; Borjan (yellow card) 69'	Stadium: Georgi Asparuhov Stadium; Attendance: 10,700; Referee: Ivaylo Stoyanov

24 October 2015 13	Ludogorets Razgrad	2 – 0	Montana	Razgrad
15:15 EEST (UTC+3)	Cafu 2'; Minev (yellow card) 38'; Moți (yellow card) 54'; Keșerü 75'	Summary	Todorov (yellow card) 36'; Popov (yellow card) 40'	Stadium: Ludogorets Arena; Attendance: 1,400; Referee: Stefan Pavlov

2 November 2015 14	Lokomotiv Plovdiv	2 – 0	Ludogorets Razgrad	Plovdiv
17:30 EET (UTC+2)	Stoyanov (yellow card) 23'; Kamburov (yellow card) 40'; Bakalov 64'; Gargorov 88'	Summary	Vitinha (yellow card) 30'; Minev (yellow card) 50'; Dyakov (yellow card) 61'; Keșerü (yellow card) 68'; Moți (yellow card) 71'	Stadium: Lokomotiv Stadium; Attendance: 1,100; Referee: Ivaylo Stoyanov

7 November 2015 15	Ludogorets Razgrad	0 – 0	Pirin Blagoevgrad	Razgrad
16:30 EET (UTC+2)	Wanderson (yellow card) 29'; Sasha (yellow card) 41'	Summary	Nikolov (yellow card) 38'; Toshev (yellow card) 39'; Trayanov (yellow card) 52'; Bengyuzov (yellow card) 90+1'; Kostov (yellow card) 90+1'	Stadium: Ludogorets Arena; Attendance: 1,500; Referee: Stanislav Stavrov

21 November 2015 16	Slavia Sofia	0 – 1	Ludogorets Razgrad	Sofia
14:00 EET (UTC+2)	Kirev (yellow card) 34'; Pirgov (yellow card) 47'	Summary	Moți 35' (pen.); Wanderson (yellow card) 44'; Keșerü (yellow card) 76'; Stoyanov (yellow card) 90+1'	Stadium: Ovcha Kupel Stadium; Attendance: 200; Referee: Georgi Kabakov

27 November 2015 17	Ludogorets Razgrad	5 – 0	Beroe	Razgrad
17:30 EET (UTC+2)	Keșerü (yellow card) 15' (goal) 80'; Wanderson 30', 62'; Marcelinho (yellow card) 33' (goal) 37'; Cafu (yellow card) 46'; Terziev 74'	Summary	Andonov (yellow card) 11'; Filipov (yellow card) 16'; Pirgov (yellow card) 60'; Isa (yellow card) 69'	Stadium: Ludogorets Arena; Attendance: 3,000; Referee: Nikolay Yordanov

2 December 2015 18	Botev Plovdiv	0 – 1	Ludogorets Razgrad	Plovdiv
14:00 EET (UTC+2)	Hristov (yellow card) 57'	Summary	Keșerü 29'; Dyakov (yellow card) 39'; Cafu (yellow card) 66'; Lukoki (yellow card) 83'	Stadium: Hristo Botev Stadium; Attendance: 2,100

5 December 2015 19	Litex Lovech	Annulled^{1}	Ludogorets Razgrad	Lovech
16:30 EET (UTC+2)	Malinov (yellow card) 14'; Popov 68'; Pérez (yellow card) 72'	Summary	Dyakov (yellow card) 18'; Marcelinho 53'; Minev (yellow card) 67' (yellow-red card) 77'; Keșerü (yellow card) 90+1'	Stadium: Lovech Stadium; Attendance: 1,100; Referee: Ivaylo Stoyanov

12 December 2015 20	Cherno More	0 – 2	Ludogorets Razgrad	Varna
14:00 EET (UTC+2)	Coulibaly (yellow card) 28'; Raykov (yellow card) 44'; Venkov (yellow card) 55'	Summary	Cafu 49'; Vitinha (yellow card) 55'; Keșerü 62'	Stadium: Ticha Stadium; Attendance: 1,800; Referee: Nikola Popov

21 February 2016 21	Ludogorets Razgrad	2 – 1	Levski Sofia	Razgrad
15:30 EET (UTC+2)	Wanderson 5'; Quixadá (yellow card) 22'; Dyakov (yellow card) 31'; Sasha 55'; Moți (red card) 71'; Stoyanov (yellow card) 89'	Summary	Kostadinov (yellow card) 14'; Minev (yellow card) 22'; A.Aleksandrov (yellow card) 41'; Narh (yellow card) 45+2'; Procházka 81'; S.Aleksandrov (yellow card) 83'; Mengolo (yellow card) 90'	Stadium: Ludogorets Arena; Attendance: 7,000; Referee: Nikola Popov

26 February 2016 22	Montana	0 – 1	Ludogorets Razgrad	Montana
15:30 EET (UTC+2)	Minchev (yellow card) 31'; Kokonov (yellow card) 45'; Genchev (yellow card) 45+1'; Lazarov (yellow card) 60'; Georgiev (yellow card) 90+1'	Summary	Kerchev (yellow card) 27'; Keșerü 77'	Stadium: Ogosta Stadium; Attendance: 2,200; Referee: Stanislav Stavrov

1 March 2016 23	Ludogorets Razgrad	2 – 0	Lokomotiv Plovdiv	Razgrad
18:00 EET (UTC+2)	Marcelinho 22'; Moți 42'; Sasha (yellow card) 66'; Terziev (yellow card) 76'; Wanderson (yellow card) 88'	Summary		Stadium: Ludogorets Arena; Attendance: 2,200; Referee: Ivaylo Stoyanov

5 March 2016 24	Pirin Blagoevgrad	1 – 3	Ludogorets Razgrad	Blagoevgrad
16:30 EET (UTC+2)	Moți 3' (o.g.); Sandanski (yellow card) 30'; Kostadinov (yellow card) 51'; Dyulgerov (yellow card) 54'; Sandev (red card) 85'	Summary	Kerchev (yellow card) 17'; Minev (yellow card) 26'; Dyakov (yellow card) 30'; Cafu 45', 69'; Keșerü 62'	Stadium: Hristo Botev Stadium; Attendance: 2,800; Referee: Stanislav Todorov

12 March 2016 25	Ludogorets Razgrad	3 – 1	Slavia Sofia	Razgrad
16:30 EET (UTC+2)	Sasha (yellow card) 33'; Cafu 37'; Wanderson 44'; Moți 64' (pen.); Terziev (yellow card) 90+3'	Summary	Moukanza 75'	Stadium: Ludogorets Arena; Attendance: 1,800; Referee: Dragomir Draganov

19 March 2016 26	Beroe	0 – 2	Ludogorets Razgrad	Stara Zagora
16:30 EET (UTC+2)	Milanov (yellow card) 16'; Tom (yellow card) 24'; Isa (yellow card) 66'; Vasilev (yellow card) 90'	Summary	Vitinha (yellow card) 29'; Kerchev 39'; Wanderson (yellow card) 41'; Cafu (yellow card) 62'; Marcelinho 90+4'	Stadium: Beroe Stadium; Attendance: 2,600; Referee: Stefan Pavlov

3 April 2016 27	Ludogorets Razgrad	1 – 0	Botev Plovdiv	Razgrad
20:15 EEST (UTC+3)	Marcelinho 40'; Dyakov (yellow card) 69'	Summary	Oshchypko (yellow card) 2' (yellow-red card) 49'	Stadium: Ludogorets Arena; Attendance: 2,700; Referee: Ivaylo Stoyanov

8 April 2016 28	Ludogorets Razgrad	Cancelled^{1}	Litex Lovech	Razgrad
EEST (UTC+3)		[ Summary]		Stadium: Ludogorets Arena

15 April 2016 29	Ludogorets Razgrad	2 – 1	Cherno More	Razgrad
20:15 EEST (UTC+3)	Wanderson 9'; Keșerü 72' (pen.); Natanael (yellow card) 90+2'	Summary	Iliev (yellow card) 21' (goal) 31'; Bacari (yellow card) 29'; Stoychev (yellow card) 52'; Georgiev (yellow card) 63'; Nikolov (yellow card) 71'; Venkov (yellow card) 87'	Stadium: Ludogorets Arena; Attendance: 2,700; Referee: Vladimir Valkov

23 April 2016 30	Levski Sofia	0 – 0	Ludogorets Razgrad	Sofia
20:00 EEST (UTC+3)	S.Aleksandrov (yellow card) 9'	Summary	Natanael (yellow card) 2'; Keșerü (yellow card) 56'; Wanderson (yellow card) 64'; Marcelinho (yellow card) 66'; Moți (yellow card) 73'	Stadium: Georgi Asparuhov Stadium; Attendance: 12,500; Referee: Stanislav Todorov

29 April 2016 31	Ludogorets Razgrad	2 – 1	Montana	Razgrad
20:00 EEST (UTC+3)	Cafu 10'; Quixadá 23'	Summary	Iliev (yellow card) 20'; Pashov 25'	Stadium: Ludogorets Arena; Attendance: 1,600; Referee: Nikolay Yordanov

7 May 2016 32	Lokomotiv Plovdiv	2 – 1	Ludogorets Razgrad	Plovdiv
20:00 EEST (UTC+3)	Kotev (yellow card) 18'; Kamburov 25'; Gargorov 34'; Teles (yellow card) 43'; Velev (yellow card) 63'; Raynov (yellow card) 66'	Summary	Moți (yellow card) 12'; Cafu (yellow card) 22' (yellow-red card) 32'; Dyakov (yellow card) 24'; Sasha (yellow card) 65'; Wanderson 90+1'	Stadium: Lokomotiv Stadium; Attendance: 2,220; Referee: Dragomir Draganov

11 May 2016 33	Ludogorets Razgrad	4 – 1	Pirin Blagoevgrad	Razgrad
20:30 EEST (UTC+3)	Prepeliță 11'; Keșerü 21'; Moți 31'; Wanderson 45'; Natanael (yellow card) 46'	Summary	Bengyuzov (yellow card) 47'; Bashliev (yellow card) 75'; Genov 81'	Stadium: Ludogorets Arena; Attendance: 1,700; Referee: Nikola Popov

16 May 2016 34	Slavia Sofia	0 – 5	Ludogorets Razgrad	Sofia
18:00 EEST (UTC+3)	Karabelyov (yellow card) 18'; Yomov (yellow card) 52'; Omar (yellow card) 63'; Diego (yellow card) 72'; Petkov (yellow card) 82'	Summary	Quixadá 7', 57'; Keșerü 20' (yellow card) 63'; Wanderson 45+2'; Kerchev (yellow card) 67'; Cafu 69' (yellow card) 90+1'; Vura (yellow card) 72'; Terziev (yellow card) 78'	Stadium: Ovcha Kupel Stadium; Attendance: 90; Referee: Stefan Apostolov

22 May 2016 35	Ludogorets	0 – 2	Beroe	Razgrad
18:00 EEST (UTC+3)	Smirnov (yellow card) 40'; Vitinha (yellow card) 53'; Minev (yellow card) 66'; Vura (yellow card) 86'	Summary	Ahmed 11'; Djoman (yellow card) 20'; Milanov (yellow card) 21'; Vasilev (yellow card) 35'; Elias (yellow card) 66'; Tom (yellow card) 78'	Stadium: Ludogorets Arena; Attendance: 6,200; Referee: Ivaylo Stoyanov

27 May 2016 36	Botev Plovdiv	2 – 1	Ludogorets	Plovdiv
18:00 EEST (UTC+3)	Vasev 18'; Dimitrov 87'	Summary	Kerchev (yellow card) 85' (goal) 90+5'	Stadium: Hristo Botev Stadium; Attendance: 1,300; Referee: Georgi Ignatov

=== Bulgarian Cup ===
23 September 2015 First Round	Lokomotiv 1929 Mezdra	0 – 5	Ludogorets Razgrad	Mezdra
16:00 EEST (UTC+3)	Y.Georgiev (yellow card); P.Zlatkov (yellow card)	Summary	Smirnov 16'; Angulo 50'; Sasha 61'; Karamfilov 66', 90'	Stadium: Stadion Lokomotiv; Referee: Georgi Ignatov

29 October 2015 Second Round	Lokomotiv Gorna Oryahovitsa	1 – 0	Ludogorets Razgrad	Gorna Oryahovitsa
13:30 EEST (UTC+3)	Penev 4' (yellow card) 85'; M.Ivanov (yellow card) 10'; Kanev (yellow card) 15'; Apostolov (yellow card) 49' (yellow-red card) 53'; Kolev (yellow card) 80'	Summary	Wanderson (yellow card) 20'; Cafu (yellow card) 30'; Vasilev (yellow card) 40'; Sasha (yellow card) 70'	Stadium: Stadion Lokomotiv; Attendance: 3,800; Referee: Nikolay Yordanov

=== Champions League ===
==== Qualifying phase ====
14 July 2015 2nd qualifying round 1st leg	Ludogorets Razgrad (Bulgaria)	0 – 1	(Moldova) Milsami Orhei	Razgrad, Bulgaria
20:45 EEST (UTC+3)	M.Aleksandrov (yellow card) 16'; Dyakov (yellow card) 48'; Moți (yellow card) 52'; Chunchukov (yellow card) 73'	Report	Shedrack (yellow card) 26'; Mîțu (yellow card) 36'; Antoniuc 41'; Rhaili (yellow card) 67'; Andronic (yellow card) 73'; Cojocari (yellow card) 85'	Stadium: Ludogorets Arena; Attendance: 5,120; Referee: Antti Munukka (Finland)

21 July 2015 2nd qualifying round 2nd leg	Milsami Orhei (Moldova)	2 – 1 (3 – 1 agg.)	(Bulgaria) Ludogorets Razgrad	Orhei, Moldova
18:00 EEST (UTC+3)	Andronic 26'; K. Belak (yellow card) 52'; Cojocari (yellow card) 56' (yellow-red card) 73'; Racu 89'; Rhaili (yellow card) 89'	Report	Wanderson 25'; Dyakov (yellow card) 57'; Juninho (yellow card) 63'	Stadium: CSR Orhei; Attendance: 2,970; Referee: Svein-Erik Edvartsen (Norway)

== Squad statistics ==
As of match played 27 May 2016

=== Appearances and goals ===
No.	Pos	Nat	Player	Total		A Group		Bulgarian Cup		Supercup		Champions League	
No.	Pos	Nat	Player	Apps	Goals	Apps	Goals	Apps	Goals	Apps	Goals	Apps	Goals
1	GK	(Canada) CAN	Milan Borjan	8	0	8	0	0	0	0	0	0	0
4	DF	(Brazil) BRA	Cicinho	12	0	10	0	1	0	0	0	0+1	0
6	DF	(Brazil) BRA	Natanael	25	0	24+1	0	0	0	0	0	0	0
8	MF	(Brazil) BRA	Lucas Sasha	24	2	19+2	1	2	1	0	0	1	0
11	FW	(Brazil) BRA	Juninho Quixadá	17	3	7+8	3	0	0	0	0	2	0
12	MF	(Madagascar) MAD	Anicet Abel	21	0	5+14	0	1	0	0	0	1	0
16	DF	(Colombia) COL	Brayan Angulo	9	1	2+3	0	2	1	0	0	2	0
17	FW	(Bulgaria) BUL	Tsvetelin Chunchukov	5	0	3	0	0	0	0	0	0+2	0
18	MF	(Bulgaria) BUL	Svetoslav Dyakov	28	0	25+1	0	0	0	0	0	2	0
19	MF	(Bulgaria) BUL	Aleksandar Vasilev	11	1	9	1	2	0	0	0	0	0
21	GK	(Bulgaria) BUL	Vladislav Stoyanov	23	0	20	0	1	0	0	0	2	0
22	FW	(Brazil) BRA	Jonathan Cafu	23	7	21+1	7	1	0	0	0	0	0
24	DF	(Bulgaria) BUL	Preslav Petrov	1	0	0+1	0	0	0	0	0	0	0
25	DF	(Bulgaria) BUL	Yordan Minev	24	0	22	0	0	0	0	0	2	0
27	DF	(Romania) ROU	Cosmin Moți	29	5	27	5	0	0	0	0	2	0
28	FW	(Romania) ROU	Claudiu Keșerü	27	15	25+1	15	0+1	0	0	0	0	0
30	MF	(Romania) ROU	Andrei Prepeliță	26	1	10+13	1	1	0	0	0	1+1	0
33	GK	(Bulgaria) BUL	Georgi Argilashki	6	0	4+1	0	1	0	0	0	0	0
34	MF	(Bulgaria) BUL	Oleg Dimitrov	2	0	1	0	1	0	0	0	0	0
37	DF	(Bulgaria) BUL	Ventsislav Kerchev	24	2	24	2	0	0	0	0	0	0
45	MF	(Bulgaria) BUL	Ivaylo Klimentov	1	0	0+1	0	0	0	0	0	0	0
55	DF	(Bulgaria) BUL	Georgi Terziev	22	1	10+11	1	1	0	0	0	0	0
71	FW	(Bulgaria) BUL	Yanaki Smirnov	3	1	2	0	1	1	0	0	0	0
77	DF	(Portugal) POR	Vitinha	12	0	10+1	0	0+1	0	0	0	0	0
80	FW	(Bulgaria) BUL	Denislav Aleksandrov	3	0	2	0	0+1	0	0	0	0	0
83	DF	(Bulgaria) BUL	Hristo Popadiyn	3	0	1+1	0	1	0	0	0	0	0
84	MF	(Bulgaria) BUL	Marcelinho	28	7	26	7	0+1	0	0	0	1	0
88	MF	(Brazil) BRA	Wanderson	28	10	21+5	9	1	0	0	0	1	1
92	MF	(Democratic Republic of the Congo) COD	Jody Lukoki	22	0	2+17	0	2	0	0	0	0+1	0
93	MF	(Netherlands) NED	Vura	17	2	11+4	2	0	0	0	0	2	0
95	FW	(Bulgaria) BUL	Borimir Karamfilov	1	2	0	0	0+1	2	0	0	0	0
98	MF	(Bulgaria) BUL	Svetoslav Kovachev	2	0	0+2	0	0	0	0	0	0	0
Players away from the club on loan:
Players who appeared for Ludogorets Razgrad that left during the season:
7	MF	(Bulgaria) BUL	Mihail Aleksandrov	6	0	0+4	0	1	0	0	0	1	0
15	DF	(Bulgaria) BUL	Aleksandar Aleksandrov	6	0	1+1	0	2	0	0	0	2	0
45	MF	(Bulgaria) BUL	Zlatko Bonev	1	0	0	0	0+1	0	0	0	0	0

=== Goal Scorers ===
Place	Position	Nation	Number	Name	A Group	Bulgarian Cup	Supercup	Champions League	Total
1	FW	(Romania)	28	Claudiu Keșerü	15	0	0	0	15
2	MF	(Brazil)	88	Wanderson	9	0	0	1	10
3	MF	(Bulgaria)	84	Marcelinho	7	0	0	0	7
3	FW	(Brazil)	22	Jonathan Cafu	7	0	0	0	7
5	DF	(Romania)	27	Cosmin Moți	5	0	0	0	5
6	FW	(Brazil)	11	Juninho Quixadá	3	0	0	0	3
7	MF	(Netherlands)	93	Vura	2	0	0	0	2
7	DF	(Bulgaria)	37	Ventsislav Kerchev	2	0	0	0	2
7	MF	(Brazil)	8	Lucas Sasha	1	1	0	0	2
7	FW	(Bulgaria)	95	Borimir Karamfilov	0	2	0	0	2
11	MF	(Bulgaria)	19	Aleksandar Vasilev	1	0	0	0	1
11	DF	(Bulgaria)	55	Georgi Terziev	1	0	0	0	1
11	MF	(Romania)	30	Andrei Prepeliță	1	0	0	0	1
11	MF	(Bulgaria)	71	Yanaki Smirnov	0	1	0	0	1
11	DF	(Colombia)	16	Brayan Angulo	0	1	0	0	1
11				Own goal	1	0	0	0	1
				TOTALS	55	5	0	1	61

=== Disciplinary record ===
Number	Nation	Position	Name	A Group		Bulgarian Cup		Supercup		Champions League		Total	
Number	Nation	Position	Name	Yellow card	Red card	Yellow card	Red card	Yellow card	Red card	Yellow card	Red card	Yellow card	Red card
1	(Canada)	GK	Milan Borjan	1	0	0	0	0	0	0	0	1	0
4	(Brazil)	DF	Cicinho	4	1	0	0	0	0	0	0	4	1
6	(Brazil)	DF	Natanael	4	0	0	0	0	0	0	0	4	0
8	(Brazil)	MF	Lucas Sasha	7	0	1	0	0	0	0	0	8	0
11	(Brazil)	MF	Juninho Quixadá	2	0	0	0	0	0	1	0	3	0
18	(Bulgaria)	MF	Svetoslav Dyakov	11	1	0	0	0	0	2	0	13	1
19	(Bulgaria)	MF	Aleksandar Vasilev	1	0	1	0	0	0	0	0	2	0
21	(Bulgaria)	GK	Vladislav Stoyanov	3	0	0	0	0	0	0	0	3	0
22	(Brazil)	FW	Jonathan Cafu	6	1	1	0	0	0	0	0	7	1
25	(Bulgaria)	DF	Yordan Minev	6	0	0	0	0	0	0	0	6	0
27	(Romania)	DF	Cosmin Moți	7	1	0	0	0	0	1	0	8	1
28	(Romania)	FW	Claudiu Keșerü	4	0	0	0	0	0	0	0	4	0
37	(Bulgaria)	DF	Ventsislav Kerchev	4	0	0	0	0	0	0	0	4	0
55	(Bulgaria)	DF	Georgi Terziev	5	0	0	0	0	0	0	0	5	0
71	(Bulgaria)	FW	Yanaki Smirnov	1	0	0	0	0	0	0	0	1	0
77	(Portugal)	DF	Vitinha	4	0	0	0	0	0	0	0	4	0
84	(Bulgaria)	MF	Marcelinho	8	0	0	0	0	0	0	0	8	0
88	(Brazil)	MF	Wanderson	6	0	1	0	0	0	0	0	7	0
92	(Democratic Republic of the Congo)	MF	Jody Lukoki	1	0	0	0	0	0	0	0	1	0
93	(Netherlands)	FW	Vura	2	0	0	0	0	0	0	0	2	0
Players who left Ludogorets Razgrad during the season:
7	(Bulgaria)	MF	Mihail Aleksandrov	1	0	0	0	0	0	1	0	2	0
			TOTALS	88	4	4	0	0	0	6	0	98	4

== Notes ==
- On 16 December 2015, Litex Lovech were expelled from the league after their players left the field in protest over referee decisions in a match against Levski Sofia on 12 December 2015. On 20 January 2016 it was announced that Litex Lovech would be relegated to B Group All results from played matches involving Litex Lovech were annulled on 22 January 2016.
