= 2014–15 PFC Ludogorets Razgrad season =

Ludogorets Razgrad
2014–15 season
- Chairman: Aleksandar Aleksandrov
- Manager: Georgi Dermendzhiev
- A Group: 1st
- Bulgarian Cup: Semi-final (vs. Levski Sofia)
- Supercup: Winners
- Champions League: Group Stage
- Top goalscorer: League: Virgil Misidjan; Juninho Quixadá (10 each); All: Juninho Quixadá (13)

The 2014–15 season was Ludogorets Razgrad's fourth season in A Football Group. They successfully defended their title, winning the championship for a fourth consecutive and overall time. Also, Ludogorets Razgrad reached the semi-finals in the Bulgarian Cup, won the SuperCup and, most notably, made their maiden appearance in the UEFA Champions League group stage, winning the play-off round against Steaua București in dramatic fashion. Ludogorets won €14,547,000 in prize money for their participation in Europe.

== Squad ==
As of match played 31 May 2015

No.	Name	Nationality	Position	Date of birth (age)	Signed from	Signed in	Contract ends	Apps.	Goals
Goalkeepers
21	Vladislav Stoyanov	(Bulgaria)	GK	8 June 1987 (aged 27)	Sheriff Tiraspol	2013		101	0
30	Georgi Argilashki	(Bulgaria)	GK	13 June 1991 (aged 23)	Brestnik 1948	2011		3	0
91	Ivan Čvorović	(Bulgaria)	GK	15 June 1985 (aged 29)	Minyor Pernik	2012		36	0
Defenders
5	Alexandre Barthe	(France)	DF	5 March 1986 (aged 29)	Litex Lovech	2011		99	10
15	Aleksandar Aleksandrov	(Bulgaria)	DF	13 April 1986 (aged 29)	Cherno More Varna	2014		32	0
16	Brayan Angulo	(Colombia)	DF	2 November 1989 (aged 25)	Granada	2014		26	0
19	Aleksandar Vasilev	(Bulgaria)	DF	27 April 1995 (aged 20)	Kaliakra Kavarna	2014		8	0
24	Preslav Petrov	(Bulgaria)	DF	1 May 1995 (aged 20)	Vidima-Rakovski	2014		1	0
25	Yordan Minev	(Bulgaria)	DF	14 October 1980 (aged 34)	Botev Plovdiv	2011		125	1
27	Cosmin Moți	(Romania)	DF	3 December 1984 (aged 30)	Dinamo București	2012		114	10
37	Ventsislav Kerchev	(Bulgaria)	DF	2 June 1997 (aged 17)	Youth Team	2014		0	0
40	Denislav Aleksandrov	(Bulgaria)	DF	19 July 1997 (aged 17)	Youth Team	2014		1	0
55	Georgi Terziev	(Bulgaria)	DF	18 April 1992 (aged 23)	Chernomorets Burgas	2013		40	1
77	Vitinha	(Portugal)	DF	11 February 1986 (aged 29)	Concordia Chiajna	2012		38	0
80	Júnior Caiçara	(Brazil)	DF	27 April 1989 (aged 26)	Santo André	2012		130	1
Midfielders
7	Mihail Aleksandrov	(Bulgaria)	MF	11 June 1989 (aged 25)	Akademik Sofia	2010		144	22
8	Espinho	(Portugal)	MF	18 August 1985 (aged 29)	Moreirense	2013		95	7
12	Anicet Abel	(Madagascar)	MF	13 March 1990 (aged 25)	Botev Plovdiv	2014		34	4
13	Veselin Lyubomirov	(Bulgaria)	MF	2 February 1996 (aged 19)	Pirin Blagoevgrad	2012		1	0
17	Dani Abalo	(Spain)	MF	29 September 1987 (aged 27)	Celta Vigo	2013		85	21
18	Svetoslav Dyakov	(Bulgaria)	MF	31 May 1984 (aged 31)	Lokomotiv Sofia	2012		146	9
23	Hristo Zlatinski	(Bulgaria)	MF	22 January 1985 (aged 30)	Lokomotiv Plovdiv	2013		78	14
28	Tomas Tsvyatkov	(Bulgaria)	MF	1 June 1997 (aged 16)	Litex Lovech	2013		0	0
38	Kristiyan Kitov	(Bulgaria)	MF	14 October 1996 (aged 18)	CSKA Sofia	2012		3	0
62	Vasil Vasilev	(Bulgaria)	MF	14 January 1998 (aged 17)	Youth Team	2014		1	0
84	Marcelinho	(Brazil)	MF	24 August 1984 (aged 30)	Bragantino	2011		154	45
88	Wanderson	(Brazil)	MF	2 January 1988 (aged 27)	Portuguesa	2014		39	10
Forwards
9	Roman Bezjak	(Slovenia)	FW	21 February 1989 (aged 26)	Celje	2012		99	29
11	Juninho Quixadá	(Brazil)	FW	12 December 1985 (aged 29)	Bragantino	2011		112	31
93	Vura	(Netherlands)	FW	24 July 1993 (aged 21)	Willem II	2013		88	24
99	Hamza Younés	(Tunisia)	FW	16 April 1986 (aged 29)	Botev Plovdiv	2014		27	5
Players away on loan
3	Teynur Marem	(Bulgaria)	DF	24 September 1994 (aged 20)	Sliven 2000	2012		1	0
10	Sebastián Hernández	(Colombia)	MF	2 October 1986 (aged 28)	Independiente Medellín	2013		31	8
Players who left during the season
4	Tero Mäntylä	(Finland)	DF	18 April 1991 (aged 24)	Inter Turku	2012		41	1
20	Choco	(Brazil)	DF	18 January 1990 (aged 25)	Santos	2011		78	2
26	Milan Borjan	(Canada)	GK	23 October 1987 (aged 27)	Sivasspor	2014		4	0
95	Jeroen Lumu	(Netherlands)	FW	27 May 1995 (aged 20)	Willem II	2013		17	2

=== Out on loan ===
Note: Flags indicate national team as defined under FIFA eligibility rules; some limited exceptions apply. Players may hold more than one non-FIFA nationality.

No. / Pos. / Nation / Player; 3 / DF / BUL / Teynur Marem (at Haskovo)	No. / Pos. / Nation / Player; 10 / MF / COL / Sebastián Hernández (at Cherno More)

== Transfers ==
=== Summer ===
In: Note: Flags indicate national team as defined under FIFA eligibility rules; some limited exceptions apply. Players may hold more than one non-FIFA nationality.

No.	Pos.	Nation	Player
12	MF	MAD	Anicet Abel (from (Bulgaria) Botev Plovdiv)
16	DF	COL	Brayan Angulo (from (Spain) Granada)
19	DF	BUL	Aleksandar Vasilev (from (Bulgaria) Kaliakra Kavarna)
24	DF	BUL	Preslav Petrov (from (Bulgaria) Vidima-Rakovski)
26	GK	CAN	Milan Borjan (from (Turkey) Sivasspor)
88	MF	BRA	Wanderson (from (Brazil) Portuguesa)
99	FW	TUN	Hamza Younés (from (Bulgaria) Botev Plovdiv)
—	MF	BUL	Steven Petkov (from (Bulgaria) Levski Sofia)

Out: Note: Flags indicate national team as defined under FIFA eligibility rules; some limited exceptions apply. Players may hold more than one non-FIFA nationality.

No.	Pos.	Nation	Player
14	MF	NED	Mitchell Burgzorg (to (Bulgaria) Slavia Sofia)
19	MF	BUL	Dimo Bakalov (to (Bulgaria) Beroe Stara Zagora)
95	FW	NED	Jeroen Lumu (to (Netherlands) Heerenveen)
99	FW	BRA	Michel Platini (to (Bulgaria) Slavia Sofia)
—	MF	BUL	Steven Petkov

=== Winter ===
In: Note: Flags indicate national team as defined under FIFA eligibility rules; some limited exceptions apply. Players may hold more than one non-FIFA nationality.

No.	Pos.	Nation	Player

Out: Note: Flags indicate national team as defined under FIFA eligibility rules; some limited exceptions apply. Players may hold more than one non-FIFA nationality.

No.	Pos.	Nation	Player
3	DF	BUL	Teynur Marem (loan to (Bulgaria) Haskovo)
4	DF	FIN	Tero Mäntylä (to (Norway) Aalesund)
10	MF	COL	Sebastián Hernández (loan to (Bulgaria) Cherno More)
20	DF	BUL	Choco
26	GK	CAN	Milan Borjan (to (Serbia) Radnički Niš)

== Competitions ==
=== Bulgarian Supercup ===
13 August 2014	Ludogorets Razgrad	3 – 1	Botev Plovdiv	Burgas
20:30 EEST (UTC+3)	Vura 53'; Marcelinho 85'; Younés 90+2'	Summary	Gamakov 18'	Stadium: Lazur Stadium

=== A Football Group ===
==== First phase ====
===== League table =====
Pos	Team	Pld	W	D	L	GF	GA	GD	Pts	Qualification
1	Ludogorets Razgrad	22	14	5	3	46	14	+32	47	Qualification for championship group
2	CSKA Sofia	22	13	5	4	39	15	+24	44	Qualification for championship group
3	Lokomotiv Sofia	22	12	3	7	29	24	+5	39 (Note: Lokomotiv Sofia ahead of Litex Lovech on head-to-head away goals scored; Lokomotiv Sofia–Litex Lovech 2–0, Litex Lovech–Lokomotiv Sofia 4–2.)	Qualification for championship group
4	Litex Lovech	22	12	3	7	37	24	+13	39	Qualification for championship group
5	Beroe Stara Zagora	22	11	5	6	34	21	+13	38	Qualification for championship group

Source: bulgarian-football.com
Rules for classification: 1st points; 2nd head-to-head points; 3rd head-to-head goal difference; 4th head-to-head goals scored; 5th head-to-head away goals scored; 6th season goal difference; 7th season goals scored; 8th "sportsmanship" (R & Y cards); 9th draw

===== Results summary =====
Overall								Home						Away					
Pld	W	D	L	GF	GA	GD	Pts	W	D	L	GF	GA	GD	W	D	L	GF	GA	GD
22	14	5	3	46	14	+32	47	9	2	0	24	4	+20	5	3	3	22	10	+12

Last updated: 14 April 2014.
Source: Soccerway

===== Results by round =====
Round	1	2	3	4	5	6	7	8	9	10	11	12	13	14	15	16	17	18	19	20	21	22
Ground	A	A	H	A	H	A	H	A	H	A	H	H	H	A	H	A	H	A	H	A	H	A
Result	L	D	W	W	W	D	D	W	W	L	D	W	W	W	W	D	W	W	W	L	W	W
Position	11	10	5	3	1	2	4	4	3	3	4	2	2	2	2	2	2	2	2	2	1	1

Source: Soccerway
A = Away; H = Home; W = Win; D = Draw; L = Loss

===== Results =====
19 July 2014 1	Haskovo	1 – 0	Ludogorets Razgrad	Haskovo
18:30 EEST (UTC+3)	Atanasov 42'	Summary		Stadium: Haskovo Stadium; Attendance: 6,000; Referee: Stanislav Stavrov

26 July 2014 2	Cherno More	0 – 0	Ludogorets Razgrad	Varna
18:00 EEST (UTC+3)		Summary		Stadium: Ticha Stadium; Attendance: 3,800; Referee: Nikolay Yordanov

2 August 2014 3	Ludogorets Razgrad	3 – 0	Marek Dupnitsa	Razgrad
18:00 EEST (UTC+3)	Lahchev 13' (o.g.); Vura 51'; Juninho Quixadá 85'	Summary		Stadium: Ludogorets Arena; Attendance: 2,000; Referee: Georgi Davidov

9 August 2014 4	Lokomotiv Plovdiv	1 – 4	Ludogorets Razgrad	Plovdiv
18:00 EEST (UTC+3)	Karagaren 90+1'	Summary	Juninho Quixadá 11', 19'; Wanderson 31'; Vura 52'	Stadium: Lokomotiv Stadium; Attendance: 3,800; Referee: Georgie Yordanov

16 August 2014 5	Ludogorets Razgrad	2 – 0	CSKA Sofia	Razgrad
20:00 EEST (UTC+3)	Vura 30'; Younés 51'	Summary		Stadium: Ludogorets Arena; Attendance: 6,000; Referee: Stanislav Stavrov

23 August 2014 6	Lokomotiv Sofia	2 – 2	Ludogorets Razgrad	Sofia
18:00 EEST (UTC+3)	Helton 31'; Tom 46'	Summary	Abel 9', 83'; Choco (yellow card) 59' (yellow-red card) 69'	Stadium: Lokomotiv Stadium; Attendance: 550; Referee: Nikola Popov

31 August 2014 7	Ludogorets Razgrad	1 – 1	Beroe Stara Zagora	Razgrad
20:00 EEST (UTC+3)	Barthe 68'	Summary	Kerkar 22'	Stadium: Ludogorets Arena; Attendance: 8,000; Referee: Stanislav Todorov

12 September 2014 8	Botev Plovdiv	1 – 2	Ludogorets Razgrad	Plovdiv
17:00 EEST (UTC+3)	Tsvetkov 88' (pen.)	Summary	Abalo 7'; Bezjak 49'	Stadium: Hristo Botev Stadium; Attendance: 2,700; Referee: Georgie Yordanov

21 September 2014 9	Ludogorets Razgrad	4 – 1	Litex Lovech	Razgrad
20:15 EEST (UTC+3)	Marcelinho 12'; Aleksandrov 45+1'; Younés 63'; Wanderson 90+1'	Summary	Asprilla 90+4'	Stadium: Ludogorets Arena; Attendance: 4,500; Referee: Ivaylo Stoyanov

27 September 2014 10	Levski Sofia	3 – 2	Ludogorets Razgrad	Sofia
19:30 EEST (UTC+3)	Bedoya 5', 37'; Sarmov 27'	Summary	Moți 16' (pen.); Caiçara (red card) 42'; Wanderson 78'	Stadium: Georgi Asparuhov; Attendance: 6,100; Referee: Georgi Kabakov

4 October 2014 11	Ludogorets Razgrad	0 – 0	Slavia Sofia	Razgrad
20:00 EEST (UTC+3)		Summary		Stadium: Ludogorets Arena; Attendance: 2,300

17 October 2014 12	Ludogorets Razgrad	3 – 1	Haskovo	Razgrad
18:45 EEST (UTC+3)	Marcelinho 37'; Moți 45+3' (pen.); Abalo 51'	Summary	Korudzhiev 6'	Stadium: Ludogorets Arena; Attendance: 1,300; Referee: Stefan Pavlov

25 October 2014 13	Ludogorets Razgrad	2 – 0	Cherno More Varna	Razgrad
19:30 EEST (UTC+3)	Wanderson 52'; Vura 75'	Summary		Stadium: Ludogorets Arena; Attendance: 800; Referee: Nikolay Yordanov

31 October 2014 14	Marek	0 – 4	Ludogorets Razgrad	Dupnitsa
14:00 EET (UTC+2)		Summary	Abalo 5', 84'; Marcelinho 27'; Bezjak 65'	Stadium: Bonchuk Stadium; Attendance: 800; Referee: Tasko Taskov

9 November 2014 15	Ludogorets Razgrad	2 – 0	Lokomotiv Plovdiv	Razgrad
18:30 EET (UTC+2)	Abalo 36'; Younés 58' (pen.)	Summary	Gospodinov (red card) 55'	Stadium: Ludogorets Arena; Attendance: 1,800; Referee: Ivaylo Stoyanov

22 November 2014 16	CSKA Sofia	1 – 1	Ludogorets Razgrad	Sofia
16:00 EET (UTC+2)	Tunchev 25'; Marquinhos (red card) 41'	Summary	Vura (red card) 14'; Espinho 37'	Stadium: Balgarska Armia Stadium; Attendance: 13,900; Referee: Tasko Taskov

30 November 2014 17	Ludogorets Razgrad	5 – 1	Lokomotiv Sofia	Razgrad
15:30 EET (UTC+2)	Aleksandrov (yellow card) 36'; Wanderson 43'; Marcelinho 54', 78'; Younés 82'; Abalo 90' (yellow card) 90+1'	Summary	Livramento (yellow card) 31'; Romanov 34'; Hadzhiev (yellow card) 50'; Trifonov (yellow card) 58' (yellow-red card) 69'	Stadium: Ludogorets Arena; Attendance: 950; Referee: Georgie Yordanov

5 December 2014 18	Beroe	0 – 4	Ludogorets Razgrad	Stara Zagora
16:00 EET (UTC+2)	Ivanov (yellow card) 32'	Summary	Juninho Quixadá 15'; Vura 18', 73'; Espinho (yellow card) 56'; Wanderson 82'	Stadium: Beroe Stadium; Attendance: 1,300; Referee: Nikolay Yordanov

14 December 2014 19	Ludogorets Razgrad	1 – 0	Botev Plovdiv	Razgrad
12:30 EET (UTC+2)	Abel 27'	Summary	Yusein (yellow card) 36'; Terziev (yellow card) 52'; Marin (yellow card) 57'	Stadium: Ludogorets Arena; Attendance: 3,500

28 February 2015 20	Litex Lovech	1 – 0	Ludogorets Razgrad	Lovech
17:00 EET (UTC+2)	Nedyalkov (yellow card) 20'; Malinov (yellow card) 24' (yellow-red card) 71'; Angelov (yellow card) 62'; Bozhikov (yellow card) 73'; Regula (yellow card) 79'; Johnsen (yellow card) 82'; Asprilla 85'	Summary	Moți (yellow card) 34' (yellow-red card) 37'; Caiçara (yellow card) 66'; Bezjak (yellow card) 81'; Barthe (yellow card) 82'; Marcelinho (yellow card) 90+4'	Stadium: Lovech Stadium; Attendance: 3,200; Referee: Georgie Yordanov

8 March 2015 21	Ludogorets Razgrad	1 – 0	Levski Sofia	Razgrad
15:30 EET (UTC+2)	Bezjak (yellow card) 39'; Dyakov (yellow card) 58'; Wanderson 61'	Summary	Procházka (yellow card) 51'; Abdi (yellow card) 60'; Añete (yellow card) 67'	Stadium: Ludogorets Arena; Attendance: 4,7000; Referee: Nikolay Yordanov

14 March 2015 22	Slavia Sofia	0 – 3	Ludogorets Razgrad	Sofia
14:30 EET (UTC+2)	Dyakov (yellow card) 51'; Fonseca (yellow card) 61'; Kassaï (yellow card) 73'	Summary	Espinho 31'; Angulo (yellow card) 40'; Dyakov (yellow card) 83'; Zlatinski 90+2' (pen.); Vura 90+3'	Stadium: Slavia Stadium; Attendance: 240; Referee: Tsvetan Krastev

==== Championship group ====
===== League table =====
Pos	Team	Pld	W	D	L	GF	GA	GD	Pts	Qualification or relegation
1	Ludogorets Razgrad (C)	32	18	9	5	63	24	+39	63	Qualification for Champions League second qualifying round
2	Beroe	32	15	10	7	46	30	+16	55 (Note: Beroe ahead of Lokomotiv Sofia on head-to-head points; Beroe: 7 pts, Lokomotiv Sofia: 4 pts.)	Qualification for Europa League first qualifying round
3	Lokomotiv Sofia (R)	32	16	7	9	39	31	+8	55	Relegation to 2015–16 V Group (Note: Lokomotiv Sofia did not receive a license for European competitions and Litex Lovech took their place.)
4	Litex Lovech	32	16	6	10	49	36	+13	54	Qualification for Europa League first qualifying round
5	CSKA Sofia (D, R)	32	14	10	8	45	27	+18	52	Relegation to 2015–16 V Group
6	Botev Plovdiv	32	12	6	14	38	39	−1	42	

Source: bulgarian-football.com
Rules for classification: 1st points; 2nd head-to-head points; 3rd head-to-head goal difference; 4th head-to-head goals scored; 5th head-to-head away goals scored; 6th season goal difference; 7th season goals scored; 8th "sportsmanship" (R & Y cards); 9th draw
(C) Champions; (D) Disqualified; (R) Relegated

===== Results summary =====
Overall								Home						Away					
Pld	W	D	L	GF	GA	GD	Pts	W	D	L	GF	GA	GD	W	D	L	GF	GA	GD
10	4	4	2	17	10	+7	16	3	2	0	12	3	+9	1	2	2	5	7	−2

Last updated: 31 May 2014.
Source: Soccerway

===== Results by round =====
Round	1	2	3	4	5	6	7	8	9	10
Ground	H	H	A	H	A	A	A	H	A	H
Result	D	W	D	W	L	W	D	W	L	D
Position	1	1	1	1	1	1	1	1	1	1

Source: Soccerway
A = Away; H = Home; W = Win; D = Draw; L = Loss

===== Results =====
22 March 2015 23	Ludogorets Razgrad	0 – 0	Botev Plovdiv	Razgrad
13:00 EET (UTC+2)	Wanderson (yellow card) 33'; Moți (yellow card) 78'	Summary	Baltanov (yellow card) 15'; Jirsák (yellow card) 35'; Chunchukov (yellow card) 39'	Stadium: Ludogorets Arena; Attendance: 3,900; Referee: Stanislav Stavrov

4 April 2015 24	Ludogorets Razgrad	4 – 0	CSKA Sofia	Razgrad
20:00 EEST (UTC+3)	Barthe 36'; Dyakov (yellow card) 56'; Marcelinho 64'; Vura 79'; Juninho Quixadá 90+1'	Summary	Stoyanov (yellow card) 24'; Nikolić (yellow card) 27'; Tunchev (yellow card) 68'	Stadium: Ludogorets Arena; Attendance: 5,300; Referee: Georgie Yordanov

13 April 2015 25	Lokomotiv Sofia	0 – 0	Ludogorets Razgrad	Sofia
17:00 EEST (UTC+3)		Summary	Juninho Quixadá (yellow card) 58'	Stadium: Lokomotiv Stadium; Attendance: 700

19 April 2015 26	Ludogorets Razgrad	3 – 1	Litex Lovech	Razgrad
20:00 EET (UTC+2)	Juninho Quixadá 38' (yellow card) 51' (yellow-red card) 56'; Moți 76'; Stoyanov (yellow card) 90+2'; Abalo 90+3'	Summary	Johnsen 19'; Bozhikov (yellow card) 23'; Malinov (yellow card) 24'; Kolev (yellow card) 41'; Pérez (yellow card) 53'; Nedyalkov (yellow card) 60'; Rumenov (yellow card) 62' (yellow-red card) 83'	Stadium: Ludogorets Arena; Attendance: 3,200; Referee: Ivaylo Stoyanov

25 April 2015 27	Beroe	2 – 0	Ludogorets Razgrad	Stara Zagora
20:00 EET (UTC+2)	Ivanov 38'; Kostadinov (yellow card) 56'; Zehirov 61' (yellow card) 73'	Summary	M.Aleksandrov (yellow card) 29'	Stadium: Beroe Stadium; Attendance: 3,700; Referee: Georgi Kabakov

3 May 2015 28	Botev Plovdiv	1 – 3	Ludogorets Razgrad	Plovdiv
15:15 EET (UTC+2)	Ognyanov (yellow card) 27'; Stachowiak (yellow card) 37'; Gamakov (yellow card) 54'; Jirsák 88'	Summary	Juninho Quixadá 2', 41'; Espinho (yellow card) 29'; Wanderson 86'	Stadium: Hristo Botev Stadium; Attendance: 2,500; Referee: Alexandre Kostadinov

9 May 2015 29	CSKA Sofia	0 – 0	Ludogorets Razgrad	Sofia
20:00 EET (UTC+2)	Sunday (yellow card) 42'	Summary	Angulo (yellow card) 59'; Barthe (yellow card) 62' (yellow-red card) 88'; Zlatinski (yellow card) 79'; Moți (yellow card) 88'; Stoyanov (yellow card) 90+8'	Stadium: Balgarska Armia Stadium; Attendance: 7,000; Referee: Nikola Popov

15 May 2015 30	Ludogorets Razgrad	4 – 1	Lokomotiv Sofia	Razgrad
19:00 EET (UTC+2)	Marcelinho 32'; Juninho Quixadá 45+1', 48'; Vura 56'	Summary	Starokin (yellow card) 14'; Genov 66'	Stadium: Ludogorets Arena; Attendance: 6,500; Referee: Stanislav Stavrov

23 May 2015 31	Litex Lovech	4 – 2	Ludogorets Razgrad	Lovech
18:00 EET (UTC+2)	Regula 48' (pen.); Johnsen 65', 69', 90' (yellow card) 68'	Summary	Vura 6'; Juninho Quixadá (yellow card) 28'; Marcelinho 45+1' (yellow card) 81'; Abalo (yellow card) 47'	Stadium: Lovech Stadium; Attendance: 700; Referee: Georgie Yordanov

31 May 2015 32	Ludogorets Razgrad	1 – 1	Beroe	Razgrad
18:00 EET (UTC+2)	Zlatinski (yellow card) 34' (goal) 90+1'	[ Summary]	Kostov 66'; Zehirov (yellow card) 68'; Pirgov (yellow card) 89'	Stadium: Ludogorets Arena; Attendance: 5,600; Referee: Georgi Kabakov

=== Bulgarian Cup ===
24 September 2014 First round	Botev Vratsa	1 – 5	Ludogorets Razgrad	Vratsa
18:45 EEST (UTC+3)	Savić (yellow card) 11'; Petkov 55'; Popadiyn (yellow card) 64'	Summary	Juninho Quixadá 21', 68'; Hernández 25', 39'; Savić 57' (o.g.)	Stadium: Hristo Botev Stadium; Attendance: 1,340; Referee: Dragomir Draganov

15 February 2015 Second round 1st leg	Beroe Stara Zagora	2 – 1	Ludogorets Razgrad	Stara Zagora
13:00 EET (UTC+2)	Kostadinov (yellow card) 23'; Elias 31' (yellow card) 38'; Mapuku (yellow card) 45+2' (goal) 71'; Ivanov (yellow card) 57'	Summary	Bezjak (yellow card) 22'; Moți (yellow card) 33'; Wanderson (yellow card) 44'; Marcelinho (yellow card) 57'; Espinho 61'	Stadium: Beroe Stadium; Attendance: 3,800; Referee: Ivaylo Stoyanov

22 February 2015 Second round 2nd leg	Ludogorets Razgrad	1 – 0 (a2 – 2 agg.)	Beroe Stara Zagora	Razgrad
15:30 EET (UTC+2)	Juninho Quixadá 8'; Aleksandrov (yellow card) 24'; Zlatinski (yellow card) 26'	Summary	Borovskij (yellow card) 7' (yellow-red card) 14'; Ivanov (yellow card) 36'; Zehirov (yellow card) 63'; Djoman (yellow card) 71'	Stadium: Ludogorets Arena; Attendance: 4,400; Referee: Stanislav Todorov

4 March 2015 Quarterfinal 1st leg	Litex Lovech	0 – 0	Ludogorets Razgrad	Lovech
17:30 EET (UTC+2)	Pérez (yellow card) 51'; Despodov (yellow card) 69'	Summary	Caiçara (yellow card) 20'; Abel (yellow card) 67'	Stadium: Lovech Stadium; Attendance: 1,900; Referee: Stanislav Todorov

18 March 2015 Quarterfinal 2nd leg	Ludogorets Razgrad	5 – 0 (5 – 0 agg.)	Litex Lovech	Razgrad
17:30 EET (UTC+2)	Dyakov 12' (yellow card) 69'; Espinho 27' (yellow card) 64'; Vura (yellow card) 29' (goal) 84'; Barthe 62'; Abalo 90+2'; Júnior Caiçara (yellow card) 90+2'	Summary	Asprilla (yellow card) 17'; Boumal (yellow card) 31'	Stadium: Ludogorets Arena; Attendance: 1,900; Referee: Tasko Taskov

8 April 2015 Semifinal 1st leg	Ludogorets Razgrad	0 – 0	Levski Sofia	Razgrad
19:00 EET (UTC+2)	Espinho (yellow card) 7'	Summary	Procházka (yellow card) 21'; Gadzhev (yellow card) 47'; Domovchiyski (yellow card) 49'; Kraev (yellow card) 50'; Belaïd (yellow card) 52'; Velev (yellow card) 83'; Jorgačević (yellow card) 90+2'; Aleksandrov (yellow card) 90+3'	Stadium: Ludogorets Arena; Attendance: 5,300; Referee: Tsvetan Krastev

29 April 2015 Semifinal 2nd leg	Levski Sofia	1 – 0 (1 – 0 agg.)	Ludogorets Razgrad	Sofia
18:45 EET (UTC+2)	Gadzhev (yellow card) 43'; Añete 90'; Jorgačević (yellow card) 90+4'; Procházka (yellow card) 90+5'	Summary	Angulo (yellow card) 25'; Dyakov (yellow card) 51'; Barthe (yellow card) 57'; Vura (yellow card) 90+5'	Stadium: Georgi Asparuhov Stadium; Attendance: 12,300; Referee: Ivaylo Stoyanov

=== Champions League ===
==== Qualifying phase ====
16 July 2014 2nd qualifying round 1st leg	Ludogorets Razgrad (Bulgaria)	4 – 0	(Luxembourg) F91 Dudelange	Razgrad, Bulgaria
20:00 EEST (UTC+3)	Abalo 35'; Bezjak 43'; Anicet 65'; Espinho 68'	Report		Stadium: Ludogorets Arena; Attendance: 4,104; Referee: Richard Trutz (Slovakia)

22 July 2014 2nd qualifying round 2nd leg	F91 Dudelange (Luxembourg)	1 – 1 (1 – 5 agg.)	(Bulgaria) Ludogorets Razgrad	Dudelange, Luxembourg
19:00 EEST (UTC+3)	Turpel 81'	Report	Bezjak 51'	Stadium: Stade Jos Nosbaum; Attendance: 842; Referee: Tobias Welz (Germany)

30 July 2014 3rd qualifying round 1st leg	Ludogorets Razgrad (Bulgaria)	0 – 0	(Serbia) Partizan	Razgrad, Bulgaria
21:00 EEST (UTC+3)		Report		Stadium: Ludogorets Arena; Attendance: 6,000; Referee: Kenn Hansen (Denmark)

6 August 2014 3rd qualifying round 2nd leg	Partizan (Serbia)	2 – 2 (2 – 2(a) agg.)	(Bulgaria) Ludogorets Razgrad	Belgrade, Serbia
20:45 EEST (UTC+3)	Škuletić 30', 35'; Trajković (red card) 41'	Report	Marcelinho 19', 21'	Stadium: Stadion Partizana; Attendance: 18,504; Referee: Aleksei Kulbakov (Belarus)

19 August 2014 Play-off round 1st leg	Steaua București (Romania)	1 – 0	(Bulgaria) Ludogorets Razgrad	Bucharest, Romania
21:45 EEST (UTC+3)	Chipciu 88'	Report		Stadium: Arena Națională; Attendance: 35,342; Referee: Felix Brych (Germany)

27 August 2014 Play-off round 2nd leg	Ludogorets Razgrad (Bulgaria)	1 – 0 (a.e.t.) (1 – 1 agg.) (6 – 5 p)	(Romania) Steaua București	Sofia, Bulgaria
21:45 EEST (UTC+3)	Wanderson 90'; Stoyanov (yellow card) 74' (red card) 119'	Report		Stadium: Vasil Levski National Stadium; Attendance: 16,995; Referee: Alberto Undiano Mallenco (Spain)
	Penalties
	Moți (penalty scored); Wanderson (penalty missed); Younés (penalty scored); Juninho Quixadá (penalty scored); Marcelinho (penalty scored); Dyakov (penalty scored); Espinho (penalty scored)		(penalty scored) Keserü; (penalty missed) Pârvulescu; (penalty scored) Szukała; (penalty scored) Popa; (penalty scored) Varela; (penalty scored) Prepeliță; (penalty missed) Râpă

==== Group stage ====
Pos	Team	Pld	W	D	L	GF	GA	GD	Pts	Qualification	RMA	BSL	LIV	LUD
1	(Spain) Real Madrid	6	6	0	0	16	2	+14	18	Advance to knockout phase	—	5–1	1–0	4–0
2	(Switzerland) Basel	6	2	1	3	7	8	−1	7	Advance to knockout phase	0–1	—	1–0	4–0
3	(England) Liverpool	6	1	2	3	5	9	−4	5	Transfer to Europa League	0–3	1–1	—	2–1
4	(Bulgaria) Ludogorets Razgrad	6	1	1	4	5	14	−9	4		1–2	1–0	2–2	—

Source: UEFA
Rules for classification: Group stage tiebreakers

16 September 2014 1	Liverpool (England)	2 – 1	(Bulgaria) Ludogorets Razgrad	Liverpool, England
21:45 EEST (UTC+3)	Balotelli 82'; Gerrard 90+3' (pen.)	Report	Abalo 90+1'	Stadium: Anfield; Attendance: 43,307; Referee: Matej Jug (Slovenia)

1 October 2014 2	Ludogorets Razgrad (Bulgaria)	1 – 2	(Spain) Real Madrid	Sofia, Bulgaria
21:45 EEST (UTC+3)	Marcelinho 6'	Report	Ronaldo 24' (pen.); Benzema 77'	Stadium: Vasil Levski National Stadium; Referee: Craig Thomson (Scotland)

22 October 2014 3	Ludogorets Razgrad (Bulgaria)	1 – 0	(Switzerland) Basel	Sofia, Bulgaria
21:45 EEST (UTC+3)	Minev 90+1'	Report	Dié (red card) 18'	Stadium: Vasil Levski National Stadium; Attendance: 29,150; Referee: Deniz Aytekin (Germany)

4 November 2014 4	Basel (Switzerland)	4 – 0	(Bulgaria) Ludogorets Razgrad	Basel, Switzerland
21:45 EET (UTC+2)	Embolo 34'; González 41'; Gashi 59'; Suchý 65'	Report		Stadium: St. Jakob-Park; Attendance: 35,272; Referee: Stéphane Lannoy (France)

26 November 2014 5	Ludogorets Razgrad (Bulgaria)	2 – 2	(England) Liverpool	Sofia, Bulgaria
21:45 EET (UTC+2)	Abalo 3'; Terziev 88'	Report	Lambert 8'; Henderson 37'	Stadium: Vasil Levski National Stadium; Attendance: 37,143; Referee: Antonio Mateu Lahoz (Spain)

9 December 2014 6	Real Madrid (Spain)	4 – 0	(Bulgaria) Ludogorets Razgrad	Madrid, Spain
21:45 EET (UTC+2)	Ronaldo 20' (pen.); Bale 38'; Arbeloa 80'; Marcelo (yellow card) 86'; Medrán 88'	Summary	Marcelinho (red card) 19'	Stadium: Santiago Bernabéu; Attendance: 58,393; Referee: Clément Turpin (France)

== Squad statistics ==
As of match played 31 May 2015

=== Appearances and goals ===
No.	Pos	Nat	Player	Total		A Group		Bulgarian Cup		Supercup		Champions League	
No.	Pos	Nat	Player	Apps	Goals	Apps	Goals	Apps	Goals	Apps	Goals	Apps	Goals
5	DF	(France) FRA	Alexandre Barthe	20	3	12+1	2	5	1	0	0	2	0
7	MF	(Bulgaria) BUL	Mihail Aleksandrov	37	1	13+9	1	3+1	0	0	0	10+1	0
8	MF	(Portugal) POR	Espinho	42	5	19+4	2	5+1	2	1	0	9+3	1
9	FW	(Slovenia) SLO	Roman Bezjak	31	4	9+6	2	3+3	0	1	0	9	2
11	FW	(Brazil) BRA	Juninho Quixadá	34	13	16+9	10	4+2	3	0	0	0+3	0
12	MF	(Madagascar) MAD	Anicet Abel	34	4	13+8	3	2+4	0	0	0	1+6	1
13	MF	(Bulgaria) BUL	Veselin Lyubomirov	1	0	0+1	0	0	0	0	0	0	0
15	DF	(Bulgaria) BUL	Aleksandar Aleksandrov	22	0	14	0	2	0	1	0	4+1	0
16	DF	(Colombia) COL	Brayan Angulo	26	0	17+3	0	3	0	0	0	2+1	0
17	MF	(Spain) ESP	Dani Abalo	43	11	20+8	7	3+1	1	1	0	8+2	3
18	MF	(Bulgaria) BUL	Svetoslav Dyakov	40	1	24	0	4	1	1	0	11	0
19	DF	(Bulgaria) BUL	Aleksandar Vasilev	8	0	2+5	0	0	0	1	0	0	0
21	GK	(Bulgaria) BUL	Vladislav Stoyanov	40	0	23	0	4+1	0	1	0	11	0
23	MF	(Bulgaria) BUL	Hristo Zlatinski	27	2	11+7	2	4	0	1	0	3+1	0
24	DF	(Bulgaria) BUL	Preslav Petrov	1	0	0+1	0	0	0	0	0	0	0
25	DF	(Bulgaria) BUL	Yordan Minev	25	1	14	0	2	0	0	0	9	1
27	DF	(Romania) ROU	Cosmin Moți	39	3	23	3	3	0	1	0	12	0
30	GK	(Bulgaria) BUL	Georgi Argilashki	1	0	1	0	0	0	0	0	0	0
40	DF	(Bulgaria) BUL	Denislav Aleksandrov	1	0	0	0	0+1	0	0	0	0	0
55	DF	(Bulgaria) BUL	Georgi Terziev	21	1	13	0	2	0	0	0	6	1
62	MF	(Bulgaria) BUL	Vasil Vasilev	1	0	0	0	0+1	0	0	0	0	0
77	DF	(Portugal) POR	Vitinha	6	0	2+1	0	2	0	0	0	1	0
80	DF	(Bulgaria) BUL	Júnior Caiçara	44	0	24+2	0	6	0	1	0	11	0
84	MF	(Brazil) BRA	Marcelinho	39	11	21+1	8	5	0	1	1	11	2
88	MF	(Brazil) BRA	Wanderson	39	10	14+13	8	3+2	0	0	0	1+6	2
91	GK	(Bulgaria) BUL	Ivan Čvorović	9	0	6	0	2	0	0	0	0+1	0
93	FW	(Netherlands) NED	Vura	45	12	24+4	10	5+1	1	0+1	1	7+3	0
99	FW	(Tunisia) TUN	Hamza Younés	27	5	8+9	4	0+2	0	0+1	1	1+6	0
Players away from the club on loan:
3	DF	(Bulgaria) BUL	Teynur Marem	1	0	0	0	1	0	0	0	0	0
10	MF	(Colombia) COL	Sebastián Hernández	3	2	0+2	0	1	2	0	0	0	0
Players who appeared for Ludogorets Razgrad that left during the season:
4	DF	(Finland) FIN	Tero Mäntylä	5	0	2	0	1	0	0+1	0	0+1	0
20	DF	(Bulgaria) BUL	Choco	7	0	5	0	1	0	0	0	1	0
26	GK	(Canada) CAN	Milan Borjan	4	0	2	0	1	0	0	0	1	0
95	FW	(Netherlands) NED	Jeroen Lumu	1	0	0	0	0	0	0	0	1	0

=== Goal scorers ===
Place	Position	Nation	Number	Name	A Group	Bulgarian Cup	Supercup	Champions League	Total
1	FW	(Brazil)	11	Juninho Quixadá	10	3	0	0	13
2	FW	(Netherlands)	93	Vura	10	1	1	0	12
2	FW	(Brazil)	84	Marcelinho	8	0	1	3	12
4	MF	(Spain)	17	Dani Abalo	7	1	0	3	11
5	MF	(Brazil)	88	Wanderson	8	0	0	1	9
6	FW	(Tunisia)	99	Hamza Younés	4	0	1	0	5
6	MF	(Portugal)	8	Espinho	2	2	0	1	5
8	MF	(Madagascar)	12	Anicet Abel	3	0	0	1	4
8	FW	(Slovenia)	9	Roman Bezjak	2	0	0	2	4
10	DF	(Romania)	27	Cosmin Moți	3	0	0	0	3
10	DF	(France)	5	Alexandre Barthe	2	1	0	0	3
12	MF	(Bulgaria)	23	Hristo Zlatinski	2	0	0	0	2
12	MF	(Colombia)	10	Sebastián Hernández	0	2	0	0	2
12				Own goal	1	1	0	0	2
15	MF	(Bulgaria)	7	Mihail Aleksandrov	1	0	0	0	1
15	MF	(Bulgaria)	18	Svetoslav Dyakov	1	0	0	0	1
15	DF	(Bulgaria)	25	Yordan Minev	0	0	0	1	1
15	DF	(Bulgaria)	55	Georgi Terziev	0	0	0	1	1
				TOTALS	63	12	3	12	90

=== Disciplinary record ===
Number	Nation	Position	Name	A Group		Bulgarian Cup		Supercup		Champions League		Total	
Number	Nation	Position	Name	Yellow card	Red card	Yellow card	Red card	Yellow card	Red card	Yellow card	Red card	Yellow card	Red card
5	(France)	DF	Alexandre Barthe	3	1	1	0	0	0	0	0	4	1
7	(Bulgaria)	MF	Mihail Aleksandrov	2	0	1	0	0	0	1	0	4	0
8	(Portugal)	MF	Espinho	6	0	2	0	0	0	3	0	11	0
9	(Slovenia)	FW	Roman Bezjak	3	0	1	0	1	0	3	0	8	0
11	(Brazil)	FW	Juninho Quixadá	4	1	0	0	0	0	0	0	4	1
12	(Madagascar)	MF	Anicet Abel	5	0	1	0	0	0	1	0	7	0
15	(Bulgaria)	DF	Aleksandar Aleksandrov	2	0	0	0	1	0	1	0	4	0
16	(Colombia)	DF	Brayan Angulo	2	0	1	0	0	0	0	0	3	0
17	(Spain)	MF	Dani Abalo	5	0	0	0	1	0	2	0	8	0
18	(Bulgaria)	MF	Svetoslav Dyakov	4	0	2	0	0	0	3	0	9	0
19	(Bulgaria)	DF	Aleksandar Vasilev	1	0	0	0	0	0	0	0	1	0
21	(Bulgaria)	GK	Vladislav Stoyanov	3	0	0	0	0	0	1	1	4	1
23	(Bulgaria)	MF	Hristo Zlatinski	2	0	1	0	0	0	1	0	4	0
25	(Bulgaria)	DF	Yordan Minev	1	0	0	0	0	0	3	0	4	0
27	(Romania)	DF	Cosmin Moți	7	1	1	0	1	0	3	0	12	1
55	(Bulgaria)	MF	Georgi Terziev	0	0	0	0	0	0	1	0	1	0
77	(Portugal)	DF	Vitinha	1	0	0	0	0	0	0	0	1	0
80	(Bulgaria)	DF	Júnior Caiçara	3	1	2	0	0	0	3	0	8	1
84	(Brazil)	MF	Marcelinho	4	0	1	0	0	0	2	1	7	1
88	(Brazil)	FW	Wanderson	1	0	1	0	0	0	1	0	3	0
93	(Netherlands)	FW	Vura	0	1	2	0	0	0	1	0	3	1
99	(Tunisia)	FW	Hamza Younés	1	0	0	0	0	0	1	0	2	0
Players who left Ludogorets Razgrad during the season:
4	(Finland)	DF	Tero Mäntylä	0	0	0	0	1	0	0	0	1	0
20	(Bulgaria)	DF	Choco	3	1	0	0	0	0	0	0	3	1
26	(Canada)	GK	Milan Borjan	0	0	0	0	0	0	1	0	1	0
			TOTALS	63	6	17	0	5	0	31	2	116	8

== Notes ==
1. Ludogorets Razgrad play their home matches at Vasil Levski National Stadium, Sofia instead of their regular stadium, Ludogorets Arena, Razgrad.
