= Borimir =

- Gender: male

Origin
- Origin: Slavic
- Meaning: boriti ("he/she battles, fights") + mir ("peace")
- Region of origin: Bulgaria, Croatia, Serbia

Other names
- Variant form: Borimira {f}
- Related names: Borislav, Borivoje

Borimir (Serbian Cyrillic: Боримир) is a Slavic masculine given name derived from borti – "battle" and mir – "peace". The feminine form is Borimira.

The following notable people have this name:

- Borimir Karamfilov (born 1995), Bulgarian footballer
- Borimir Perković (born 1967), Croatian former footballer

== See also ==
- Slavic names
