= Brayan Angulo (footballer, born 1989) =

Colombian footballer

Personal information
- Full name: Brayan Alexis Angulo León
- Date of birth: 2 November 1989 (age 37)
- Place of birth: Cali, Colombia
- Height: 1.75 m (5 ft 9 in)
- Position: Left-back

Youth career
- América Cali

Senior career*
Years	Team	Apps	(Gls)
2006–2007	América Cali	35	(1)
2008	Boavista	13	(0)
2009–2010	Leixões	17	(0)
2009–2010	→ Deportivo La Coruña (loan)	0	(0)
2010–2011	Deportivo La Coruña	0	(0)
2010–2011	→ Rayo Vallecano (loan)	4	(0)
2011–2012	Atlético Baleares	39	(2)
2012–2014	Granada	49	(1)
2014–2017	Ludogorets Razgrad	26	(0)
2015–2016	Ludogorets II	11	(0)
2016–2017	→ Chiapas (loan)	29	(0)
2017–2020	Puebla	93	(6)
2021–2022	Tijuana	48	(2)
2022–2023	Toluca	40	(1)
2023–2025	Puebla	7	(2)

International career
2014	Colombia	1	(0)

Managerial career
- 2025: Puebla (Assistant)
- * Club domestic league appearances and goals as of 17:01, 12 May 2023 (UTC)

Brayan Alexis Angulo León (born 2 November 1989) is a former Colombian professional footballer who last played as a left-back for Liga MX club Puebla.

== Club career ==
Born in Cali, Valle del Cauca, Angulo began his career at América de Cali where he caught the eye of Spanish investors, rumored to be working for Real Betis. His work permit to play in La Liga did not go through, and he eventually signed with Portugal's Boavista F.C. in July 2007 even though he was only certified in February of the following year, appearing regularly for the northerners as they were finally relegated due to irregularities.

After starting the 2008–09 season without a team, Angulo eventually returned to Portugal in January 2009, playing with fellow Primeira Liga club Leixões S.C. until the end of the campaign. In June, he was transferred to Deportivo de La Coruña on a season-long loan move, with the Galicians having an option to make the move permanent afterwards – the fee was reportedly €1 million for 60% of his rights and €100,000 for the loan period.

In a season where Deportivo finished in tenth position in the top level, both Angulo and starter Filipe Luís suffered serious injuries which put them out of action for several months, with the former failing to manage one single official appearance whatsoever. In late July 2010 he was bought permanently from Leixões, being immediately loaned to another side in Spain, Rayo Vallecano in Segunda División.

On 9 July 2012, after one year in the lower leagues with CD Atlético Baleares, Angulo moved straight into the top level, penning a three-year contract with Granada CF. He made his debut in the top flight on 30 September, coming on as a 67th-minute substitute for Fabián Orellana in a 2–1 home win against RC Celta de Vigo; his first goal in the competition came on 5 January of the following year, but in a 1–2 home loss to Valencia CF.

In 2013–14, after Guilherme Siqueira left for S.L. Benfica, Angulo became undisputed first choice for Lucas Alcaraz' team. On 20 June 2014, he joined First Professional Football League (Bulgaria) club PFC Ludogorets Razgrad. In the summer of 2017 Angulo signed a contract with Liga MX club Puebla.

== International career ==
Angulo was first called up by Colombia in November 2014, by national team coach José Pekerman. He remained an unused substitute in the 2–1 away win against the United States on the 14th, but played ten minutes four days later with Slovenia after replacing Juan Cuadrado (also away, 1–0 success).

== Club statistics ==
As of match played 8 July 2023

Club	Season	League			National cup (Note: Includes Copa del Rey, Bulgarian Cup, Copa MX)		Continental		Total	
Club	Season	Division	Apps	Goals	Apps	Goals	Apps	Goals	Apps	Goals
Boavista	2007–08	Primeira Liga	13	0	0	0	–		13	0
Leixões	2008–09	Primeira Liga	17	0	0	0	–		17	0
Deportivo	2009–10	La Liga	0	0	2	0	–		2	0
Deportivo	2010–11	La Liga	0	0	0	0	–		0	0
Deportivo	Total		0	0	2	0	–		2	0
Rayo Vallecano	2010–11	Segunda División	4	0	0	0	–		4	0
Atlético Baleares	2011–12	Segunda División B	39	2	0	0	–		39	2
Granada	2012–13	La Liga	15	1	2	0	–		17	1
Granada	2013–14	La Liga	34	0	1	0	–		35	0
Granada	Total		49	1	3	0	0	0	52	1
Ludogorets	2014–15	Bulgarian First League	20	0	3	0	3 (Note: Appearances in UEFA Champions League)	0	26	0
Ludogorets	2015–16	Bulgarian First League	11	0	2	1	2	0	15	1
Ludogorets	Total		31	0	5	1	5	0	41	1
Chiapas (loan)	2016–17	Liga MX	29	0	2	0	–		31	0
Puebla	2017–18	Liga MX	32	2	0	0	–		32	2
Puebla	2018–19	Liga MX	28	2	5	0	–		33	2
Puebla	2019–20	Liga MX	15	1	0	0	–		15	1
Puebla	2020–21	Liga MX	18	1	0	0	–		18	1
Puebla	Total		93	6	5	0	–		98	6
Tijuana	2020–21	Liga MX	17	0	–		–		17	0
Tijuana	2021–22	Liga MX	31	2	–		–		31	2
Tijuana	Total		48	2	–		–		48	2
Club Deportivo Toluca	2022–23	Liga MX	40	1	–		–		40	1
Puebla	2023–24	Liga MX	2	2	–		–		2	2
Career total			365	14	17	1	5	0	387	15

== Honours ==
Ludogorets

- Bulgarian First League: 2014–15, 2015–16

Individual

- Liga MX All-Star: 2022
