= Hamza Younés =

Tunisian footballer (born 1986)

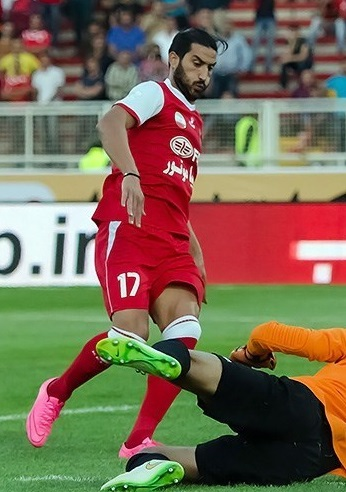
- Younés playing for Tractor SC in 2015

Personal information
- Date of birth: 16 April 1986 (age 40)
- Place of birth: Monastir, Tunisia
- Height: 1.86 m (6 ft 1 in)
- Position: Forward

Youth career
- 1996–2005: US Monastir

Senior career*
Years	Team	Apps	(Gls)
2006–2011	Sfaxien	135	(46)
2011	Étoile du Sahel	22	(18)
2012–2013	Petrolul Ploiești	52	(34)
2014	Botev Plovdiv	17	(7)
2014–2015	Ludogorets Razgrad	17	(4)
2015–2016	Tractor SC	13	(3)
2016	Concordia Chiajna	0	(0)
2016–2017	Xanthi	27	(19)
2017–2018	BB Erzurumspor	16	(7)
2018	Al Ahli	8	(2)
2018–2019	Aris	25	(9)
2019–2020	Petrolul Ploiești	15	(0)
2020–2021	AEL	7	(1)
2021	Concordia Chiajna	22	(3)
2022–2023	ACSC Petrolul 95		
2023	Voința Limpeziș		
Total		376	(153)

International career
2014–2017	Tunisia	11	(0)

Managerial career
- 2023: Voința Limpeziș
- * Club domestic league appearances and goals

Hamza Younés (Arabic: حمزة يونس; born 16 April 1986) is a Tunisian former professional footballer who played as a forward.

After starting out at Sfaxien in his native country, Younés went on to compete in Romania, Bulgaria, Iran, Greece, Turkey and Qatar. Internationally, he amassed eleven caps for Tunisia between 2014 and 2017.

== Club career ==
In August 2011, a few hours before the transfer deadline, Younés was brought to Étoile du Sahel, in an attempt to replace Ahmed Akaïchi. He later signed a three-year contract with the team. On 14 November 2011, Younés left Étoile.

In February 2012, after Younés' unsuccessful transfer to Astra Giurgiu because of contractual misunderstandings, he scored a move to fellow Liga 1 team Petrolul Ploieşti. He made an immediate impact with the team, scoring 12 times in his first six months with the "Yellow Wolves". In the 2012–13 Liga 1 season he played 28 games and scored 13 goals, he also won the Romanian Cup playing in 4 games.

On 28 January 2014, Younés signed with Bulgarian club Botev Plovdiv on a three-year deal for an undisclosed fee. On his debut that took place on 23 February, he scored twice in the 2–2 draw with Ludogorets Razgrad, putting in a MOTM performance and was subsequently recognized as the best performer of the round.

In August 2014, Younés put pen to paper on a contract with Ludogorets Razgrad. He scored his first goal for the club in the 3–1 win over his former club, Botev Plovdiv, in the Bulgarian Supercup final. Younés made his debut in UEFA Champions League group stages in the 2–1 loss to Liverpool, providing an assist for Daniel Abalo's equalizer.

He joined Persian Gulf Pro League club Tractor SC in summer of 2015. On 30 July 2015, Younés made his debut for Tractor SC against Naft Tehran. He scored his first goal on 20 September 2015 in a 1–0 Hazfi Cup victory against Saba Qom.

On 4 July 2016, Younés signed with Super League Greece club Xanthi on a year deal for an undisclosed fee. He finished the season as the second top scorer of the league after the Swedish striker Marcus Berg.

=== Aris ===
On 20 July 2018, after a year playing with BB Erzurumspor and Al Ahli, Younés has agreed to return to Greek Super League and sign contract until the summer of 2020 with Aris. On 2 September 2018, the Tunisian striker received a high cross from Manolis Tzanakakis and tapped it in with his chest, thus scoring his first goal for the season and opening the score in a 2–0 home win against AEL. On 17 September 2018, he opened the score with a penalty in a 2–0 home win against Levadiakos. On 30 September 2018, he scored in a 2–0 home win against Asteras Tripolis, successfully converting a penalty won by Mateo García. On 25 November 2018, Younés scored twice in added time as an astonishing finish matchday clash against OFI ended in a 2–1 win for the Salonica club at the Theodoros Vardinogiannis Stadium. One week later, he opened the scored with a penalty kick in an eventual 1–1 home draw against Panathinaikos.

On 18 March 2019, Younés came in as a substitute and scored in a 5–0 home win against Apollon Smyrnis, returning to goals after three-and-a-half months. On 22 April 2019, his goal helped the team to a 2–1 away win against Panetolikos. On 5 May 2019, in the last matchday of the season, he was the undisputed MVP of a 7–2 home win against Xanthi, scoring one goal and providing his teammates with two assists.

=== Petrolul Ploiești ===
On 9 September 2019, Younés signed a contract with Petrolul Ploiești.

== International career ==
On 28 May 2014, he made his debut for Tunisia, playing in the last four minutes of a 1–0 friendly win against South Korea. His second cap came in a 1–0 friendly loss to Belgium.

== Personal life ==
Hamza married a Romanian woman in Ploiești in 2016, with whom he has a child.

== Career statistics ==
=== Club ===
As of match played 31 August 2019

Appearances and goals by club, season and competition
Club	Season	League			National cup (Note: Includes Cupa României, Bulgarian Cup, Hazfi Cup, Greek Cup, Turkish Cup)		Continental		Other		Total	
Club	Season	Division	Apps	Goals	Apps	Goals	Apps	Goals	Apps	Goals	Apps	Goals
Petrolul Ploiești	2011–12	Liga I	13	12	0	0	—		—		13	12
Petrolul Ploiești	2012–13	Liga I	28	13	4	0	—		—		32	13
Petrolul Ploiești	2013–14	Liga I	11	9	1	0	6 (Note: Appearance(s) in UEFA Europa League)	3	1 (Note: Appearance in Supercupa României)	0	19	12
Petrolul Ploiești	Total		52	34	5	0	6	3	1	0	64	37
Botev Plovdiv	2013–14	A Group	13	5	5	1	—		—		18	6
Botev Plovdiv	2014–15	A Group	4	2	0	0	—		—		4	2
Botev Plovdiv	Total		17	7	5	1	0	0	0	0	22	8
Ludogorets Razgrad	2014–15	A Group	17	4	2	0	6 (Note: Appearances in UEFA Champions League)	0	1 (Note: Appearance in Bulgarian Super Cup)	1	26	5
Tractor SC	2015–16	Persian Gulf Pro League	13	3	2	2	—		—		15	5
Xanthi	2016–17	Super League Greece	27	19	4	1	—		—		31	20
BB Erzurumspor	2017–18	1. Lig	16	7	2	0	—		—		18	7
Al Ahli	2017–18	Qatar Stars League	6	2	0	0	—		—		6	2
Aris	2018–19	Super League Greece	24	9	3	0	—		—		27	9
Aris	2019–20	Super League Greece	1	0	0	0	1	0	—		2	0
Aris	Total		25	9	3	0	1	0	0	0	29	9
Career total			173	85	23	4	13	3	2	1	211	93

=== International ===
Appearances and goals by national team and year
National team	Year	Apps	Goals
Tunisia	2014	6	0
Tunisia	2015	3	0
Tunisia	2016	0	0
Tunisia	2017	2	0
Total		11	0

== Honours ==
CS Sfaxien

- Tunisian Cup: 2008–09
- CAF Confederation Cup: 2007, 2008
- North African Cup Winners Cup: 2009

Petrolul Ploiești

- Cupa României: 2012–13

Ludogorets Razgrad

- Bulgarian A Group: 2014–15
- Bulgarian Supercup: 2014

Individual

- Liga I Player of the Month: December 2013
