= Ventsislav Bengyuzov =

Bulgarian footballer

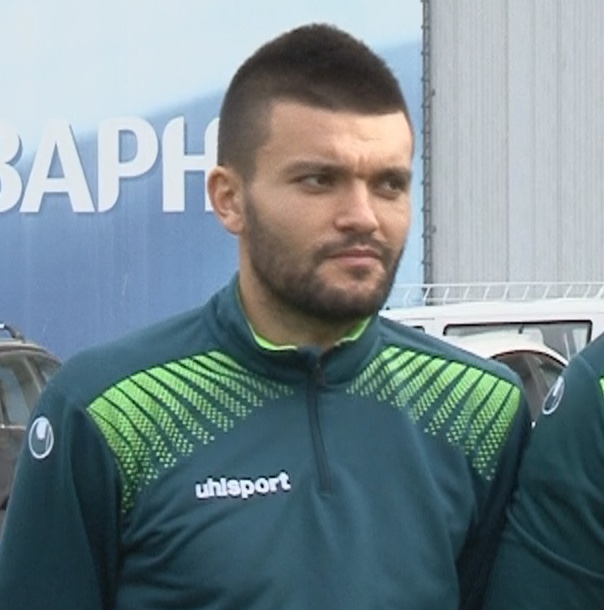

Personal information
- Full name: Ventsislav Bozhidarov Bengyuzov
- Date of birth: 22 January 1991 (age 35)
- Place of birth: Kresna, Bulgaria
- Height: 1.78 m (5 ft 10 in)
- Position: Midfielder

Team information
- Current team: Vihren Sandanski
- Number: 73

Youth career
- Litex Lovech

Senior career*
Years	Team	Apps	(Gls)
2008–2011	Litex Lovech	3	(0)
2009–2010	→ Brestnik 1948 (loan)	35	(3)
2011	→ Pirin Blagoevgrad (loan)	6	(0)
2011	→ Vidima-Rakovski (loan)	7	(0)
2012	Pirin Blagoevgrad	?	(?)
2012–2015	Bansko	53	(4)
2015–2016	Pirin Blagoevgrad	25	(0)
2017–2018	Vereya	43	(4)
2018–2019	Arda	32	(1)
2019–2020	Slavia Sofia	30	(0)
2021–2024	Pirin Blagoevgrad	87	(6)
2024–	Vihren Sandanski	54	(2)

International career
2010–2011	Bulgaria U21	7	(0)
- * Club domestic league appearances and goals as of 11 June 2026

Ventsislav Bengyuzov (Bulgarian: Венцислав Бенгюзов; born 22 January 1991) is a Bulgarian professional footballer who plays as a midfielder for Vihren Sandanski.

He previously played for Litex Lovech, Brestnik 1948, Pirin Blagoevgrad, Vidima-Rakovski, Bansko, Vereya, Arda Kardzhali and Slavia Sofia.
