= Borimir Karamfilov =

Bulgarian footballer

Personal information
- Full name: Borimir Asenov Karamfilov
- Date of birth: 13 May 1995 (age 31)
- Place of birth: Devin, Bulgaria
- Height: 1.78 m (5 ft 10 in)
- Position: Midfielder

Team information
- Current team: Marista Milevo
- Number: 14

Youth career
- Botev Plovdiv

Senior career*
Years	Team	Apps	(Gls)
2013–2015	Botev Plovdiv	0	(0)
2013–2014	→ Rakovski (loan)	10	(0)
2015–2016	Ludogorets II	14	(0)
2015–2016	Ludogorets	0	(0)
2016–2017	Oborishte	21	(0)
2018	Nesebar	17	(0)
2019	Neftochimic	22	(4)
2020	Borislav Parvomay		
2020–2021	Maritsa Plovdiv		
2021	Spartak Pleven		
2021–2020	Krumovgrad		
2022–2024	Spartak Pleven	61	(6)
2024–2025	Haskovo	8	(0)
2025–	Marista Milevo		
- * Club domestic league appearances and goals as of 16 October 2025

Borimir Karamfilov (Bulgarian: Боримир Карамфилов; born 13 May 1995) is a Bulgarian footballer who plays as a midfielder for Marista Milevo.

== Career ==
=== Botev Plovdiv ===
Born in Devin Karamfilov started his career in Botev Plovdiv. For the 2013/14 season he was sent on loan to Rakovski. For the next season he was part of the first team of Botev. He never made a debut for the team, but scored 9 goals in the U21 League for the team in that season. He left the club in the summer of 2015 to join the Bulgarian champions Ludogorets Razgrad.

=== Ludogorets Razgrad ===
Borimir joined the 2nd team of Ludogorets - Ludogorets Razgrad II. He made his debut for the team in B Group on 25 July 2015 in a match against Dunav Ruse.

On 23 September 2015 he made his debut for Ludogorets first team in a match against Lokomotiv 1929 Mezdra for the Bulgarian Cup scoring 2 goals.

== Statistics ==
=== Club ===
As of 12 December 2015

Club performance			League		Cup		Continental		Other		Total	
Club	League	Season	Apps	Goals	Apps	Goals	Apps	Goals	Apps	Goals	Apps	Goals
Bulgaria			League		Bulgarian Cup		Europe		Other (Note: Includes Bulgarian Supercup matches.)		Total	
Rakovski (loan)	B Group	2013–14	10	0	4	0	–		–		14	0
Botev Plovdiv	A Group	2014–15	0	0	0	0	0	0	–		0	0
Ludogorets Razgrad II	B Group	2015–16	8	0	–		–		–		8	0
Ludogorets Razgrad	A Group	2015–16	0	0	1	2	0	0	0	0	1	2
Career statistics			18	0	5	2	0	0	0	0	23	2
