= Fábio Espinho =

Portuguese footballer (born 1985)

Espinho
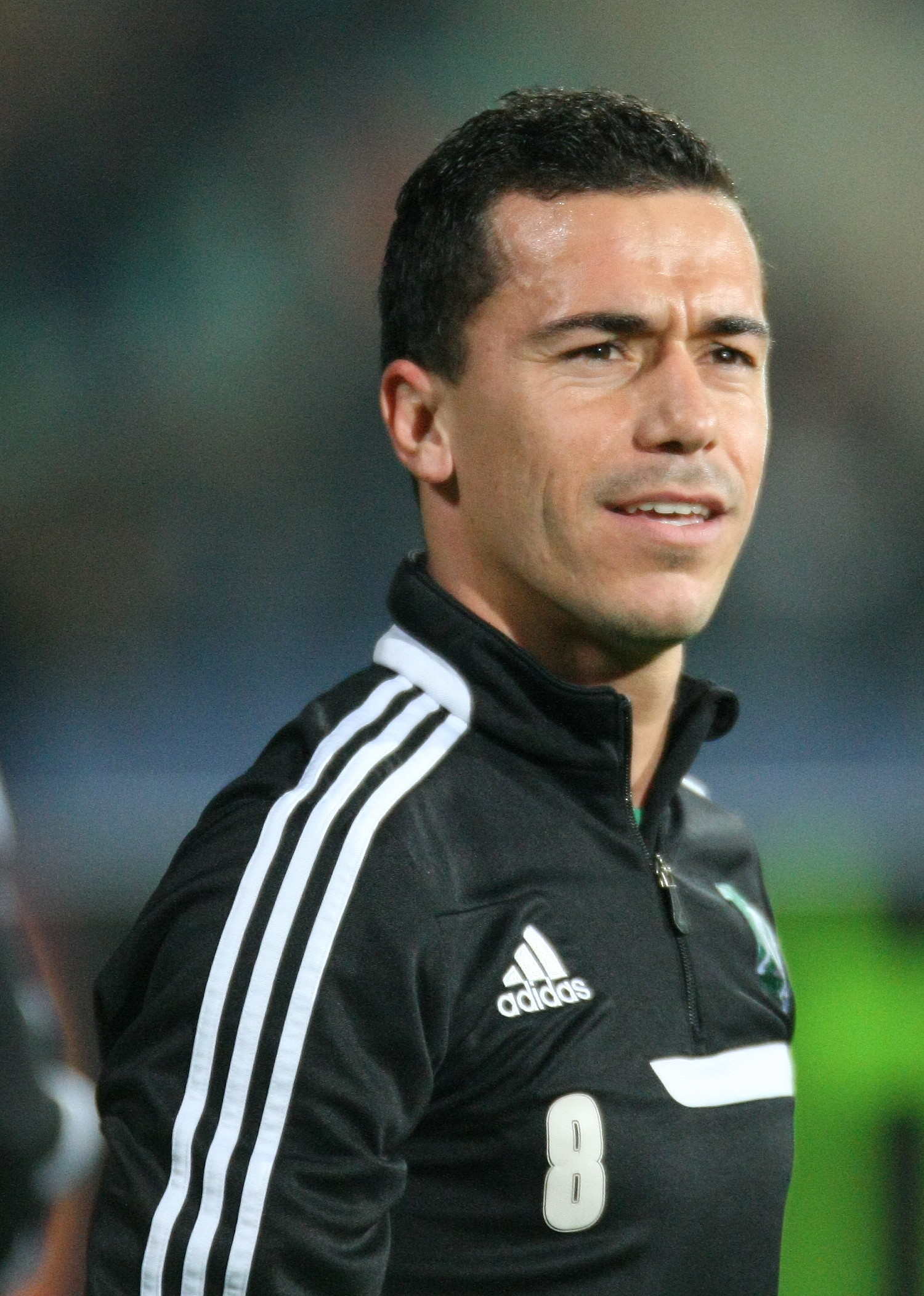
- Espinho with Ludogorets in 2014

Personal information
- Full name: Fábio Ricardo Gomes Fonseca
- Date of birth: 18 August 1985 (age 41)
- Place of birth: Espinho, Portugal
- Height: 1.71 m (5 ft 7 in)
- Position: Central midfielder

Youth career
- 1993–2004: Porto

Senior career*
Years	Team	Apps	(Gls)
2004–2006	Porto B	36	(2)
2006–2009	Espinho	79	(12)
2009–2011	Leixões	40	(0)
2011–2013	Moreirense	51	(11)
2013–2015	Ludogorets	52	(4)
2015–2016	Málaga	2	(0)
2016	→ Moreirense (loan)	15	(2)
2016–2019	Boavista	86	(10)
2019–2023	Feirense	95	(10)
Total		456	(51)
- * Club domestic league appearances and goals

Fábio Ricardo Gomes Fonseca (born 18 August 1985), commonly known as Espinho, is a Portuguese former professional footballer who played as a central midfielder.

== Career ==
Espinho was born in Espinho. A product of FC Porto's youth system, he never appeared officially for its first team, spending two years with the reserves in the third division. In 2006, he signed with local S.C. Espinho in the same level.

On 8 June 2011, after two seasons in the Segunda Liga with Leixões SC, Espinho joined Moreirense FC. He scored nine goals in his first year to help the club return to the Primeira Liga after a seven-year absence, and, on 19 August 2012, celebrated his debut in the competition by netting his team's goal in a 1–1 away draw against F.C. Paços de Ferreira.

On 11 June 2013, Espinho signed a one-year contract with PFC Ludogorets Razgrad of the Bulgarian A Football Group, moving abroad for the first time at the age of 28. He appeared in 95 competitive games during his spell (seven goals), helping to back-to-back national championships.

Espinho left Ludogorets in June 2015, and agreed to a deal at Málaga CF as a free agent. He played only three matches for the Spaniards before returning to Moreirense on loan the following January, then joined Boavista F.C. in the same league on a one-year contract.

== Career statistics ==
As of 16 May 2015

Appearances and goals by club, season and competition
Club	Season	League			Cup		Other		Total	
Club	Season	Division	Apps	Goals	Apps	Goals	Apps	Goals	Apps	Goals
Porto B	2004–05	Segunda Divisão	14	2	—		—		14	2
Porto B	2005–06	Segunda Divisão	22	0	—		—		22	0
Porto B	Total		36	2	0	0	0	0	36	2
Espinho	2006–07	Segunda Divisão	24	1	3	1	—		27	2
Espinho	2007–08	Segunda Divisão	29	2	2	0	—		31	2
Espinho	2008–09	Segunda Divisão	26	9	1	0	—		27	9
Espinho	Total		79	12	6	1	0	0	85	13
Leixões	2009–10	Primeira Liga	13	0	5	1	—		18	1
Leixões	2010–11	Segunda Liga	27	0	5	2	—		32	2
Leixões	Total		40	0	10	3	0	0	50	3
Moreirense	2011–12	Segunda Liga	28	9	10	2	—		38	11
Moreirense	2012–13	Primeira Liga	23	2	7	0	—		30	2
Moreirense	Total		51	11	17	2	0	0	68	13
Ludogorets Razgrad	2013–14	A Group	29	2	10	0	15 (Note: Appearances in UEFA Champions League and UEFA Europa League)	0	54	2
Ludogorets Razgrad	2014–15	A Group	23	2	6	2	12 (Note: Appearances in UEFA Champions League)	1	41	5
Ludogorets Razgrad	Total		52	4	16	2	27	1	95	7
Career total			258	29	49	8	27	1	334	38
