= Ventsislav Kerchev =

Bulgarian footballer (born 1997)

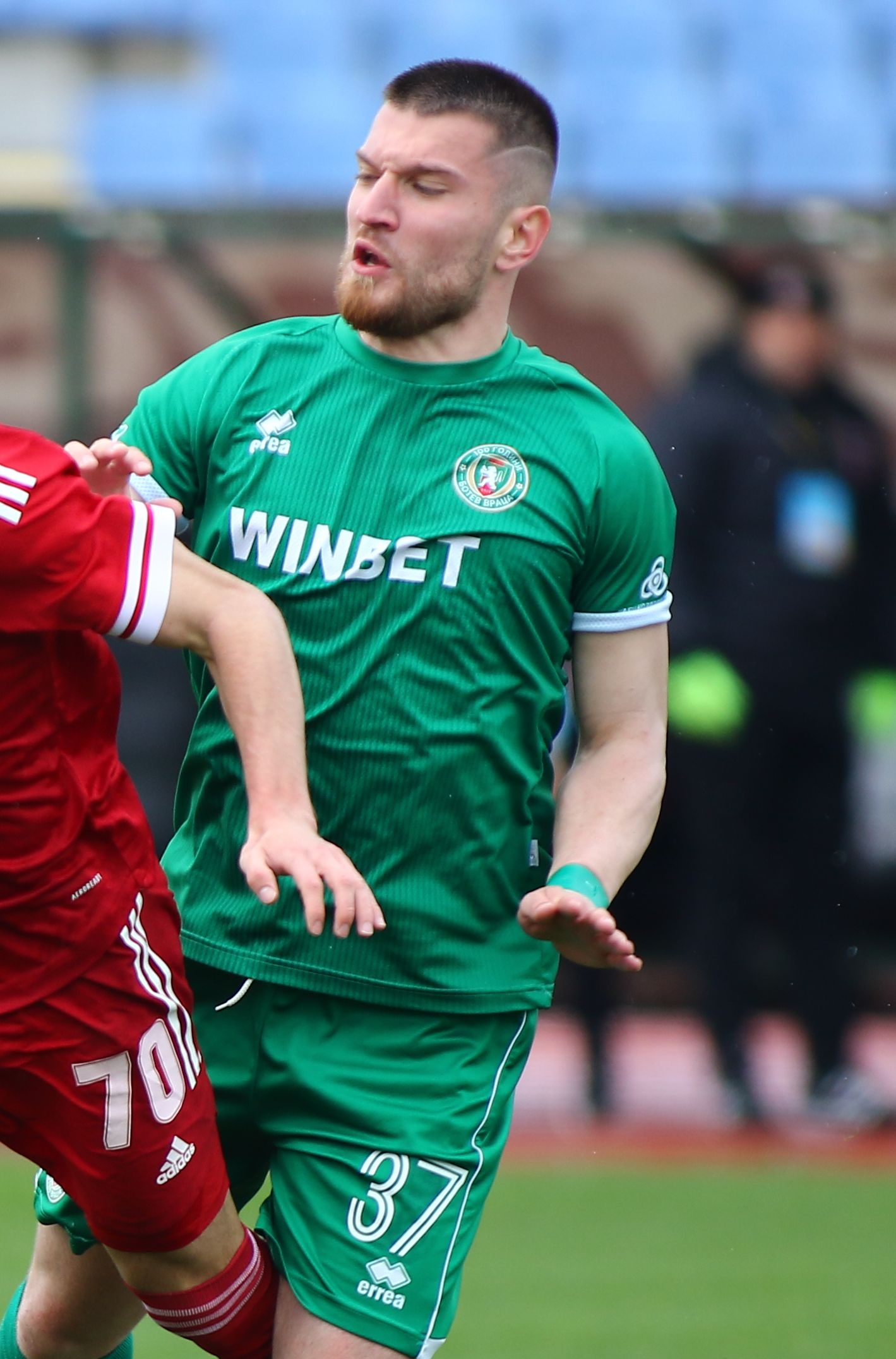

Personal information
- Full name: Ventsislav Plamenov Kerchev
- Date of birth: 2 June 1997 (age 29)
- Place of birth: Ruse, Bulgaria
- Height: 1.80 m (5 ft 11 in)
- Positions: Centre back; left-back

Team information
- Current team: Cherno More
- Number: 37

Youth career
- 2004–2010: Dunav Ruse
- 2011–2015: Ludogorets Razgrad

Senior career*
| Years | Team | Apps | (Gls) |
| 2015–2018 | Ludogorets Razgrad II | 35 | (2) |
| 2015–2019 | Ludogorets Razgrad | 28 | (2) |
| 2016–2017 | → Lokomotiv GO (loan) | 24 | (0) |
| 2018–2019 | → Botev Vratsa (loan) | 30 | (2) |
| 2019–2021 | Botev Vratsa | 58 | (2) |
| 2021–2025 | Slavia Sofia | 108 | (4) |
| 2025–2026 | Dobrudzha Dobrich | 35 | (0) |
| 2026– | Cherno More | 9 | (0) |

International career
| 2013–2014 | Bulgaria U17 | 3 | (0) |
| 2015–2016 | Bulgaria U19 | 13 | (0) |
| 2016–2018 | Bulgaria U21 | 12 | (1) |
- * Club domestic league appearances and goals as of 13 October 2026

Ventsislav Kerchev (Bulgarian: Венцислав Керчев; born 2 June 1997) is a Bulgarian professional footballer who plays as a defender for First League club Cherno More Varna.

== Career ==
=== Early career ===
Born in Ruse, Kerchev began his football career playing for Dunav Ruse at the age of seven. In 2010, he joined Ludogorets's youth setup.

=== Ludogorets Razgrad ===
At the start of the 2015–16 season, Kerchev was promoted to the club's reserve team in the B Group, the second level of Bulgarian football. He made his debut on 25 July, in a 3–2 home defeat against Dunav Ruse.

After spending August and the early part of September playing with Ludogorets II, Kerchev was called up to the senior team by manager Eduard Eranosyan. He made his debut in the A Group on 19 September, playing full 90 minutes in the centre of defence against Botev Plovdiv. On 19 March 2016, he scored his first goal in the team's league match against Beroe Stara Zagora at Beroe Stadium. Ludogorets won the match 2–0.

For the 2017–18 season Kerchev returned for club's reserve team from his loan from Lokomotiv GO and started as a captain in the first match for the season on 24 July 2017 against Lokomotiv 1929 Sofia.

On 13 June 2018, Kerchev's contract was extended and he was sent on a season-long loan to Botev Vratsa.

=== Slavia Sofia ===
After 3 seasons for Botev in total, Kerchev joined Slavia Sofia on 14 June 2021.

=== Cherno More Varna ===
In June 2026, he put pen to paper on a deal with Cherno More Varna.

== Career statistics ==
=== Club ===
As of 10 May 2020

Appearances and goals by club, season and competition
| Club | Season | League | | | Bulgarian Cup | | Europe | | Other | | Total | |
| Club | Season | Division | Apps | Goals | Apps | Goals | Apps | Goals | Apps | Goals | Apps | Goals |
|---|---|---|---|---|---|---|---|---|---|---|---|---|
| Ludogorets Razgrad II | 2015–16 | B Group | 9 | 0 | – | | – | | – | | 9 | 0 |
| Ludogorets Razgrad II | 2017–18 | Second League | 26 | 2 | – | | – | | – | | 26 | 2 |
| Ludogorets Razgrad II | Total | | 35 | 2 | 0 | 0 | 0 | 0 | 0 | 0 | 35 | 2 |
| Ludogorets Razgrad | 2015–16 | A Group | 26 | 2 | 0 | 0 | 0 | 0 | 0 | 0 | 26 | 2 |
| Ludogorets Razgrad | 2017–18 | First League | 2 | 0 | 0 | 0 | 0 | 0 | — | | 2 | 0 |
| Ludogorets Razgrad | Total | | 28 | 2 | 0 | 0 | 0 | 0 | 0 | 0 | 28 | 2 |
| Lokomotiv GO (loan) | 2016–17 | First League | 24 | 0 | 0 | 0 | – | | 1 | 0 | 25 | 0 |
| Botev Vratsa (loan) | 2018–19 | First League | 30 | 2 | 1 | 0 | – | | – | | 31 | 2 |
| Botev Vratsa | 2019–20 | First League | 29 | 1 | 3 | 1 | – | | – | | 32 | 2 |
| Botev Vratsa | 2020–21 | First League | 29 | 1 | 1 | 0 | – | | 1 | 0 | 31 | 1 |
| Botev Vratsa | Total | | 88 | 4 | 5 | 1 | 0 | 0 | 1 | 0 | 94 | 5 |
| Career total | | | 175 | 8 | 5 | 1 | 0 | 0 | 2 | 0 | 182 | 9 |

== Honours ==
Ludogorets

- Bulgarian League: 2015–16
