= Teynur Marem =

Bulgarian footballer

Personal information
- Full name: Teynur Marem Marem
- Date of birth: 24 September 1994 (age 32)
- Place of birth: Haskovo, Bulgaria
- Height: 1.83 m (6 ft 0 in)
- Position: Centre-back

Team information
- Current team: OFC Haskovo
- Number: 5

Youth career
- Haskovo
- Sliven 2000

Senior career*
| Years | Team | Apps | (Gls) |
| 2010–2012 | Sliven 2000 | 3 | (0) |
| 2012–2016 | Ludogorets | 0 | (0) |
| 2013–2014 | → Haskovo (loan) | 20 | (0) |
| 2015 | → Haskovo (loan) | 6 | (1) |
| 2015–2016 | Ludogorets II | 20 | (0) |
| 2016–2017 | Dunav Ruse | 27 | (0) |
| 2018 | Tsarsko Selo | 15 | (1) |
| 2018–2019 | Slavia Sofia | 19 | (0) |
| 2019–2021 | Izvor Gorski Izvor | | |
| 2021–2024 | Sayana Haskovo | | |
| 2025– | OFC Haskovo | | |

International career
- Bulgaria U17
| 2013–2015 | Bulgaria U21 | 2 | (0) |
- * Club domestic league appearances and goals as of 19:26, 22 February 2023 (UTC)

Teynur Marem Marem (Bulgarian: Тейнур Марем Марем; born 23 September 1994) is a Bulgarian footballer who plays as a centre-back for OFC Haskovo.

== Career ==
Marem started his career from Sliven 2000. During season 2010-11 he made his debut for the team in A group. He has three matches for the team. He formerly played for Ludogorets Razgrad, but did not establish himself as a starter.

== Career statistics ==
=== Club ===
As of 17:40, 24 September 2014 (UTC)

| Club | Season | Division | League | | Cup | | Europe | | Total | |
| Club | Season | Division | Apps | Goals | Apps | Goals | Apps | Goals | Apps | Goals |
|---|---|---|---|---|---|---|---|---|---|---|
| Sliven 2000 | 2010–11 | A Group | 1 | 0 | 0 | 0 | – | | 1 | 0 |
| Sliven 2000 | 2011–12 | B Group | 2 | 0 | 0 | 0 | – | | 2 | 0 |
| Sliven 2000 | Total | | 3 | 0 | 0 | 0 | 0 | 0 | 3 | 0 |
| Ludogorets Razgrad | 2012–13 | A Group | 0 | 0 | 0 | 0 | 0 | 0 | 0 | 0 |
| Ludogorets Razgrad | 2013–14 | A Group | 0 | 0 | 0 | 0 | 0 | 0 | 0 | 0 |
| Haskovo (loan) | 2013–14 | B Group | 20 | 0 | 1 | 0 | – | | 21 | 0 |
| Ludogorets Razgrad | 2014–15 | A Group | 0 | 0 | 1 | 0 | 0 | 0 | 1 | 0 |
| Haskovo (loan) | 2014–15 | A Group | 6 | 1 | – | | – | | 6 | 1 |
| Ludogorets Razgrad | 2015–16 | A Group | 0 | 0 | 0 | 0 | 0 | 0 | 0 | 0 |
| Ludogorets Razgrad | Total | | 0 | 0 | 1 | 0 | 0 | 0 | 1 | 0 |
| Career Total | | | 23 | 0 | 2 | 0 | 0 | 0 | 25 | 0 |

== Honours ==
=== Club ===
Ludogorets

- A PFG 2012–13
