= List of Bulgarian football transfers winter 2014–15 =

This is a list of Bulgarian football transfers for the 2014–15 winter transfer window. Only transfers involving a team from the A group and B group are listed.

== A PFG ==
=== Beroe ===
In:

No.	Pos.	Nation	Player
2	DF	LTU	Valdemar Borovskij (from (Lithuania) FK Šiauliai)
7	MF	BUL	Anton Ognyanov (from Levski Sofia)
10	FW	BUL	Georgi Andonov (from (Turkey) Denizlispor)
23	GK	BUL	Ilko Pirgov (from Cherno More)
77	MF	GER	Savio Nsereko (from (Kazakhstan) FC Atyrau)

Out:

No.	Pos.	Nation	Player
2	DF	BUL	Iliya Munin (to Litex Lovech)
10	FW	BUL	Ventsislav Hristov (to (Croatia) Rijeka)
24	DF	SUI	Mihael Kovačević (to (Hungary) Nyíregyháza Spartacus)
73	GK	BUL	Ivan Karadzhov (released)
92	MF	MKD	Stefan Spirovski (to (North Macedonia) Vardar)

=== Botev Plovdiv ===
In:

No.	Pos.	Nation	Player

Out:

No.	Pos.	Nation	Player
14	MF	BIH	Goran Galešić (released)

=== Cherno More ===
In:

No.	Pos.	Nation	Player
15	MF	BUL	Petar Zlatinov (from Litex Lovech)
20	FW	BUL	Villyan Bijev (from Slavia Sofia)
22	MF	COL	Sebastián Hernández (on loan from Ludogorets Razgrad)
23	DF	MLI	Mamoutou Coulibaly (from (Kazakhstan) Kaisar)
28	DF	BUL	Toni Stoichkov (from CSKA Sofia)
40	GK	SRB	Aleksandar Čanović (Free agent)

Out:

No.	Pos.	Nation	Player
12	GK	BUL	Hristiyan Hristov (released)
25	DF	BUL	Sasho Aleksandrov (to Levski Sofia)
26	GK	BUL	Ilko Pirgov (to Beroe Stara Zagora)
30	MF	BUL	Dimo Atanasov (to Marek Dupnitsa)
31	FW	BUL	Miroslav Manolov (to (Romania) Târgu Mureș)

=== CSKA Sofia ===
In:

No.	Pos.	Nation	Player
5	MF	CRO	Mario Brkljača (from (Austria) Mattersburg)
9	FW	MNE	Stefan Nikolić (from (South Korea) Incheon United)
88	MF	ANG	Amâncio Fortes (from (Portugal) C.D. Fátima)
92	GK	LVA	Maksims Uvarenko (from (Latvia) Ventspils)

Out:

No.	Pos.	Nation	Player
5	DF	NED	Cendrino Misidjan (to (Netherlands) Emmen)
17	FW	ROU	Sergiu Buș (to (England) Sheffield Wednesday)
30	DF	BUL	Vasil Popov (on loan to Etar Veliko Tarnovo)
32	MF	BUL	Radoy Bozhilov (on loan to Dobrudzha Dobrich)
45	FW	BUL	Grigor Dolapchiev (on loan to Haskovo, previously on loan at (North Macedonia) Turnovo)
46	DF	BUL	Toni Stoichkov (to Cherno More)
71	MF	BUL	Anton Karachanakov (to (Russia) Baltika Kaliningrad)
99	GK	BUL	Stoyan Kolev (retired)

=== Haskovo ===
In:

No.	Pos.	Nation	Player
2	DF	GER	Orhan Aktaş (from (Sweden) Husqvarna FF)
3	DF	BUL	Teynur Marem (on loan from Ludogorets Razgrad)
5	DF	BUL	Tihomir Trifonov (from Etar Veliko Tarnovo)
8	FW	BUL	Velislav Todorov (Free agent)
9	FW	BUL	Grigor Dolapchiev (on loan from CSKA Sofia)
12	GK	BUL	Kiril Akalski (from Rakovski)
24	MF	NGA	Oshobe Oladele (from Lokomotiv Plovdiv)
27	MF	BUL	Dimitar Andonov (from Marek Dupnitsa)
89	MF	BUL	Stanislav Malamov (from Lokomotiv Plovdiv)
96	GK	BUL	Eduard Mechikyan (from Sozopol)

Out:

No.	Pos.	Nation	Player
4	MF	BUL	Nedyalko Hubenov (to Dimitrovgrad)
5	MF	RUS	Oleg Shalayev (end of contract)
6	MF	BUL	Dzhihat Kyamil (to Etar Veliko Tarnovo)
8	FW	BUL	Emil Angelov (retired)
9	MF	BUL	Doncho Atanasov (end of contract)
13	GK	BUL	Emil Danchev (to Vereya)
18	MF	GHA	Michael Tawiah (to (Serbia) Borac Čačak)
22	GK	BUL	Boyan Peykov (end of contract)
24	DF	BUL	Martin Kovachev (to (Indonesia) Pusamania Borneo)
26	DF	BUL	Kostadin Nichev (to Dobrudzha Dobrich)
27	DF	BUL	Nikolay Dimitrov (to Chernomorets Burgas)
44	MF	BUL	Galin Dimov (to Chernomorets Burgas)
66	MF	BUL	Vasil Velev (to Oborishte)
88	MF	BUL	Atanas Chipilov (to Pirin Blagoevgrad)

=== Levski Sofia ===
In:

No.	Pos.	Nation	Player
2	DF	BUL	Sasho Aleksandrov (from Cherno More)
7	MF	NOR	Liban Abdi (on loan from (Turkey) Çaykur Rizespor)
9	FW	POL	Łukasz Gikiewicz (from (Cyprus) AEL Limassol)
29	GK	SRB	Bojan Jorgačević (Free agent)
31	DF	ROU	Emil Ninu (from (Romania) Universitatea Cluj)

Out:

No.	Pos.	Nation	Player
1	GK	MKD	Kristijan Naumovski (to (Romania) Dinamo București)
7	MF	BUL	Anton Ognyanov (to Beroe Stara Zagora)
13	MF	ALG	Najib Ammari (to (Italy) Latina)
16	MF	BUL	Miroslav Ivanov (to Lokomotiv Gorna Oryahovitsa)
24	GK	BUL	Aleksandar Lyubenov (on loan to Septemvri Simitli)
35	DF	BUL	Plamen Dimov (to (Kazakhstan) Kaisar)
71	DF	BUL	Plamen Krumov (to Slavia Sofia)

=== Litex Lovech ===
In:

No.	Pos.	Nation	Player
2	DF	BUL	Iliya Munin (from Beroe Stara Zagora)
5	DF	COL	Rafael Pérez (from (Brazil) Portuguesa)
10	MF	POR	Paulo Regula (on loan from (Portugal) Olhanense)
11	FW	USA	Bjørn Johnsen (from (Portugal) Atlético CP)

Out:

No.	Pos.	Nation	Player
4	MF	BUL	Krasimir Stanoev (on loan to Pirin, previously on loan at Dobrudzha)
6	DF	SEN	Jackson Mendy (released)
8	MF	BUL	Reyan Daskalov (on loan to Chernomorets Burgas)
9	FW	COL	Wilmar Jordán (to (China) Tianjin Teda)
14	MF	ALB	Armando Vajushi (to (Italy) Chievo)
24	MF	BUL	Petar Zlatinov (to Cherno More)
25	MF	BUL	Angel Zdravchev (on loan to Vereya)
78	MF	FRA	Omar Kossoko (released)

=== Lokomotiv Plovdiv ===
In:

No.	Pos.	Nation	Player
2	DF	BUL	Radoslav Dimitrov (Free agent)
6	DF	BUL	Martin Sechkov (from Pirin Razlog)
13	DF	BUL	Ignat Dishliev (from (Albania) Partizani Tirana)
15	DF	BUL	Aleksandar Goranov (from Lokomotiv Gorna Oryahovitsa)
16	MF	FRA	Mehdi Bourabia (Free agent)
19	MF	BUL	Shaban Osmanov (from Asenovets)
89	MF	FRA	Yohann Lasimant (Free agent)

Out:

No.	Pos.	Nation	Player
2	DF	BUL	Ivaylo Dimitrov (to Chernomorets Burgas)
6	DF	ARG	Elian Parrino (to (Argentina) Douglas Haig)
13	FW	BUL	Georgi Stefanov (to Vereya)
14	MF	BUL	Stanislav Malamov (to Haskovo)
15	DF	BUL	Angel Granchov (to Slavia Sofia)
19	MF	BUL	Blagoy Nakov (to Pirin Blagoevgrad)
24	MF	NGA	Oshobe Oladele (to Haskovo)
91	GK	BUL	Bozhidar Stoychev (released)

=== Lokomotiv Sofia ===
In:

No.	Pos.	Nation	Player
23	MF	BUL	Emil Gargorov (from (China) Shijiazhuang Yongchang)
66	DF	BUL	Orlin Starokin (from (Kazakhstan) Irtysh Pavlodar)

Out:

No.	Pos.	Nation	Player
10	MF	BUL	Georg Vasilev (on loan to Marek Dupnitsa)
23	MF	BUL	Aleksandar Manolov (on loan to Marek Dupnitsa)
88	MF	BUL	Petar Dimitrov (to Lokomotiv Mezdra)

=== Ludogorets Razgrad ===
In:

No.	Pos.	Nation	Player

Out:

No.	Pos.	Nation	Player
3	DF	BUL	Teynur Marem (on loan to Haskovo)
4	DF	FIN	Tero Mäntylä (to (Norway) Aalesunds FK)
10	MF	COL	Sebastián Hernández (on loan to Cherno More)
20	DF	BRA	Guilherme Choco (released)
26	GK	CAN	Milan Borjan (to (Serbia) Radnički Niš)

=== Marek Dupnitsa ===
In:

No.	Pos.	Nation	Player
4	DF	BUL	Iliyan Garov (from (Iceland) Víkingur)
5	DF	BUL	Martin Kavdanski (from (North Macedonia) FK Shkëndija)
7	MF	BUL	Georg Vasilev (on loan from Lokomotiv Sofia)
9	MF	BUL	Tomislav Pavlov (from Pirin Blagoevgrad)
14	MF	BUL	Aleksandar Manolov (on loan from Lokomotiv Sofia)
15	MF	BUL	Pavel Petkov (from Botev Vratsa)
17	MF	BUL	Todor Kolev (from Kaliakra Kavarna)
19	FW	BUL	Rangel Abushev (from (Cyprus) Enosis Neon Paralimni)
20	MF	BUL	Dimo Atanasov (from Cherno More)

Out:

No.	Pos.	Nation	Player
2	MF	BUL	Angel Rusev (to Botev Lukovit)
4	DF	BUL	Denis Pidev (to Vereya)
7	MF	BUL	Mario Bliznakov (to Bansko)
15	MF	BUL	Petar Tonchev (to Pirin Blagoevgrad)
16	DF	BUL	Nikolay Nikolov (to Conegliano German)
17	FW	BUL	Kristiyan Petkov (to Dobrudzha Dobrich)
19	MF	BUL	Dimitar Andonov (to Haskovo)
20	MF	BUL	Dimitar Iliev (to (Greece) Acharnaikos)
21	DF	BUL	Stamen Kazalov (to Slivnishki Geroy)

=== Slavia Sofia ===
In:

No.	Pos.	Nation	Player
5	MF	CMR	Franck Mbarga (from (Greece) Ethnikos Gazoros)
13	GK	BUL	Mario Kirev (from (Romania) Olt Slatina)
14	MF	BUL	Ivaylo Dimitrov (from Dobrudzha Dobrich)
20	FW	BUL	Petar Atanasov (from Rakovski)
45	MF	BUL	Slavcho Shokolarov (Free agent)
70	DF	BUL	Plamen Krumov (from Levski Sofia)
77	MF	BUL	Martin Stankev (from Bansko)
88	DF	BUL	Angel Granchov (from Lokomotiv Plovdiv)

Out:

No.	Pos.	Nation	Player
4	DF	MKD	Kire Ristevski (to (Albania) KF Tirana)
9	FW	BUL	Villyan Bijev (to Cherno More)
10	MF	BRA	Fernando Silva (released)
11	MF	NED	Mitchell Burgzorg (released)
18	MF	BUL	Dimitar Georgiev (to PFC Burgas)
20	FW	BRA	Michel Platini (to (Brazil) Brasília)
32	GK	BUL	Diyan Valkov (on loan to Pirin Razlog)
77	FW	MKD	Dušan Savić (to (Kazakhstan) Zhetysu)
88	MF	BUL	Chavdar Yankov (released)

== B PFG ==
=== Bansko ===
In:

No.	Pos.	Nation	Player
—	DF	BUL	Mihail Minkov (from Oborishte)
—	MF	BUL	Yordan Yordanov (from OFC Pavlikeni)
—	MF	BUL	Krasimir Iliev (from Spartak Varna)
—	MF	BUL	Nikolay Dichev (from Tundzha Yambol)
—	MF	BUL	Mario Bliznakov (from Marek Dupnitsa)
—	FW	BUL	Tsvetan Pavlov (from Rakovski)

Out:

No.	Pos.	Nation	Player
7	MF	BUL	Martin Stankev (to Slavia Sofia)
15	MF	BUL	Georgi Angelov (to Montana)
24	MF	BUL	Lyubomir Vitanov (to Pirin Blagoevgrad)

=== Botev Galabovo ===
In:

No.	Pos.	Nation	Player
2	DF	BUL	Martin Zdravchev (from Spartak Plovdiv)
6	MF	BUL	Milen Zhelev (from Zagorets Nova Zagora)
7	MF	BUL	Emil Ivanov (from Spartak Plovdiv)
45	MF	BUL	Isus Angelov (from Vereya)
92	FW	BUL	Redzheb Halil (from Sozopol)

Out:

No.	Pos.	Nation	Player
7	MF	BUL	Ivan Vinkov (to Vereya)
9	MF	BUL	Aleksandar Mihaylov (released)
15	DF	BUL	Plamen Dimitrov (released)
19	DF	BUL	Dobromir Dimitrov (released)

=== Botev Vratsa ===
In:

No.	Pos.	Nation	Player
—	GK	BUL	Angel Yusev (from Oborishte)
—	DF	BUL	Lyubomir Despotov (from Shumen 1929)
—	DF	BUL	Ivo Malinov (Free agent)
—	DF	BUL	Petar Alyoshev (from Chernomorets Burgas)
—	DF	BUL	Iliyan Marchev (from Gigant Saedinenie)
—	DF	BUL	Nikolay Marinov (Free agent)
—	MF	BUL	Grigor Georgiev (from Rozova Dolina)
—	MF	BUL	Nikolay Botev (from PFC Burgas)
—	MF	BUL	Alyosha Iliev (from Vidima-Rakovski)
—	MF	BUL	Dilyan Dimitrov (from Partizan Cherven Bryag)
—	MF	BUL	Tsvetelin Tonev (from Rakovski)
—	MF	BUL	Petar Petrov (from Minyor Pernik)
—	FW	BUL	Valdemar Stoyanov (from Lokomotiv Mezdra)

Out:

No.	Pos.	Nation	Player
4	DF	BUL	Hristo Popadiyn (to Lokomotiv Mezdra)
7	MF	ITA	Alessandro Del Genio (released)
9	FW	BUL	Vasil Kaloyanov (released)
10	MF	BUL	Vlado Ivanov (released)
14	MF	BUL	Pavel Petkov (to Marek Dupnitsa)
15	DF	BUL	Emanuil Borisov (released)
17	MF	BUL	Tsvetomir Valeriev (to Kaliakra Kavarna)
18	MF	BUL	Svetoslav Valeriev (released)
19	DF	BUL	Simeon Ivanov (to Dobrudzha Dobrich)
20	DF	BUL	Ruslan Kuang (released)
21	GK	BUL	Yulian Levashki (released)
22	MF	BUL	Georgi Stoichkov (released)
23	MF	BUL	Kiril Atanasov (released)
27	FW	BUL	Aleksandar Dimitrov (released)
33	GK	ITA	Angelo Montenegro (released)

=== Burgas ===
In:

No.	Pos.	Nation	Player
8	MF	BUL	Dimitar Georgiev (from Slavia Sofia)
15	FW	BUL	Eray Karadayi (Free agent)
16	DF	BUL	Stoyan Kizhev (from Chernomorets Burgas)
17	MF	BUL	Stanimir Andonov (from Dobrudzha Dobrich)
18	MF	BUL	Emil Rachev (from Rozova Dolina)
23	DF	BUL	Stanislav Zhekov (from Nesebar)
77	MF	BUL	Emanuil Manev (from (Czech Republic) Ústí nad Labem)
90	GK	BUL	Kostadin Georgiev (Free agent)

Out:

No.	Pos.	Nation	Player
6	DF	BUL	Stoyan Mantarov (to Sozopol)
8	MF	BUL	Nikolay Botev (to Botev Vratsa)
9	FW	BUL	Georgi Stanchev (to Kaliakra Kavarna)
12	GK	BUL	Yanko Georgiev (to Chernomorets Burgas)
13	MF	BUL	Marin Dimitrov (released)
15	FW	BUL	Petar Kolev (to Sozopol)
17	MF	BUL	Yani Pehlivanov (to Chernomorets Burgas)
18	MF	BUL	Anatoli Todorov (to Conegliano German)
20	DF	BUL	Yuri Ivanov (released)
22	MF	BUL	Tsvetomir Tsonkov (to Chernomorets Burgas)
23	MF	BUL	Borislav Borisov (to Chernomorets Burgas)

=== Chernomorets Burgas ===
In:

No.	Pos.	Nation	Player
1	GK	BUL	Yanko Georgiev (from PFC Burgas)
8	MF	BUL	Reyan Daskalov (on loan from Litex Lovech)
11	FW	BUL	Borislav Borisov (from PFC Burgas)
13	DF	BUL	Alish Kalyonski (from Pirin Gotse Delchev)
17	DF	BUL	Ivaylo Dimitrov (from Lokomotiv Plovdiv)
20	MF	BUL	Yani Pehlivanov (from PFC Burgas)
21	FW	BUL	Denil Seliminski (from Botev Lukovit)
22	MF	BUL	Tsvetomir Tsonkov (from PFC Burgas)
27	DF	BUL	Nikolay Dimitrov (from Haskovo)
44	MF	BUL	Galin Dimov (from Haskovo)

Out:

No.	Pos.	Nation	Player
5	DF	BUL	Lyubomir Gutsev (to Septemvri Simitli)
6	DF	BUL	Stoyan Kizhev (to PFC Burgas)
7	MF	BUL	Stefan Traykov (retired)
11	MF	BUL	Iskren Pisarov (to Etar Veliko Tarnovo)
13	MF	BUL	Ahmed Hikmet (to Chernomorets Balchik)
14	DF	BUL	Petar Alyoshev (to Botev Vratsa)
19	MF	BUL	Petar Lazarov (released)
22	DF	BUL	Stoyko Ivanov (released)
23	MF	BUL	Ivaylo Petrov (released)
31	DF	BUL	Daniel Andreev (to Levski Sofia U19)
73	DF	BUL	Daniel Stoyanov (released)

=== Dobrudzha ===
In:

No.	Pos.	Nation	Player
4	DF	BUL	Daniel Gramatikov (Free agent)
6	MF	BUL	Petar Kazakov (from Vereya)
7	MF	BUL	Radoy Bozhilov (on loan from CSKA Sofia)
8	MF	BUL	Georgi Dimitrov (Free agent)
9	FW	BUL	Filip Filchev (from Septemvri Tervel)
10	MF	BUL	Valentin Veselinov (from (Greece) Trikala)
11	MF	BUL	Nikolay Petrov (from Etar Veliko Tarnovo)
14	DF	BUL	Daniel Genov (from Svetkavitsa)
15	DF	BUL	Mladen Dimitrov (from Septemvri Tervel)
17	FW	BUL	Kristiyan Petkov (from Marek Dupnitsa)
19	MF	BUL	Aleksandar Dimitrov (from Chavdar Etropole)
21	DF	BUL	Kostadin Nichev (from Haskovo)
89	DF	BUL	Simeon Ivanov (from Botev Vratsa)

Out:

No.	Pos.	Nation	Player
4	DF	BUL	Detelin Dimitrov (to Kaliakra Kavarna)
6	DF	BUL	Nikolay Hristozov (to Lokomotiv Mezdra)
7	MF	BUL	Ivaylo Dimitrov (to Slavia Sofia)
8	MF	BUL	Stanimir Andonov (to PFC Burgas)
9	FW	BUL	Ivelin Vasilev (to Kaliakra Kavarna)
10	MF	BUL	Spas Georgiev (released)
11	MF	BUL	Ivaylo Lazarov (released)
12	GK	BUL	Nikolay Radomirov (to Kaliakra Kavarna)
14	MF	BUL	Simeon Simeonov (to Kaliakra Kavarna)
15	MF	BUL	Mustafa Mustafa (released)
19	FW	BUL	Ivan Tsachev (to Montana)
21	MF	BUL	Emil Kolev (to Lokomotiv Mezdra)
31	MF	BUL	Krasimir Stanoev (loan return to Litex Lovech)
89	DF	BUL	Kostadin Gadzhalov (to (Scotland) Dundee)

=== Lokomotiv Gorna Oryahovitsa ===
In:

No.	Pos.	Nation	Player
12	GK	BUL	Nikolay Mitev (from Vidima-Rakovski)
20	MF	BUL	Miroslav Ivanov (from Levski Sofia)
71	DF	BUL	Ivo Harizanov (from (North Macedonia) FK Turnovo)
94	FW	BUL	Yuliyan Nenov (from Montana)

Out:

No.	Pos.	Nation	Player
12	GK	BUL	Plamen Hristanov (released)
44	DF	BUL	Aleksandar Goranov (to Lokomotiv Plovdiv)
71	MF	BUL	Plamen Iliev (to Spartak Pleven)

=== Lokomotiv Mezdra ===
In:

No.	Pos.	Nation	Player
6	DF	BUL	Nikolay Hristozov (from Dobrudzha Dobrich)
10	MF	BUL	Petar Dimitrov (from Lokomotiv Sofia)
16	DF	BUL	Hristo Popadiyn (from Botev Vratsa)
21	MF	BUL	Emil Kolev (from Dobrudzha Dobrich)
91	DF	BUL	Aleksandar Mihaylov (from Sportist Svoge)

Out:

No.	Pos.	Nation	Player
2	DF	BUL	Kristiyan Katov (released)
7	FW	BUL	Valdemar Stoyanov (to Botev Vratsa)
10	MF	BUL	Borislav Baldzhiyski (to Montana)
16	MF	BUL	Boris Petkov (released)
99	DF	BUL	Yavor Yankov (released)

=== Montana ===
In:

No.	Pos.	Nation	Player
15	MF	BUL	Georgi Angelov (from Bansko)
27	MF	BUL	Borislav Baldzhiyski (from Lokomotiv Mezdra)
—	FW	BUL	Ivan Tsachev (from Dobrudzha Dobrich)

Out:

No.	Pos.	Nation	Player
4	DF	BUL	Georgi Peychev (released)
11	FW	BUL	Yuliyan Nenov (to Lokomotiv Gorna Oryahovitsa)
14	DF	BUL	Angel Rahov (to FC Eurocollege)
26	DF	BUL	Valeri Georgiev (retired)

=== Pirin Blagoevgrad ===
In:

No.	Pos.	Nation	Player
6	MF	BUL	Krasimir Stanoev (on loan from Pirin Blagoevgrad)
11	MF	BUL	Petar Tonchev (from Marek Dupnitsa)
17	MF	BUL	Atanas Chipilov (from Haskovo)
24	MF	BUL	Lyubomir Vitanov (from Bansko)
25	MF	BUL	Blagoy Nakov (from Lokomotiv Plovdiv)
26	DF	BUL	Evgeni Tuntev (from Pirin Razlog)

Out:

No.	Pos.	Nation	Player
6	DF	BUL	Georgi Georgiev (to Oborishte)
11	MF	BUL	Tomislav Pavlov (to Marek Dupnitsa)
16	MF	BUL	Smail Kreboliev (on loan to Pirin Gotse Delchev)
17	MF	BUL	Todor Trayanov (to Septemvri Simitli)
23	FW	BUL	Tsvetan Varsanov (to Pirin Razlog)
25	DF	BUL	David Stoyanov (released)

=== Pirin Razlog ===
In:

No.	Pos.	Nation	Player
9	FW	BUL	Iliyan Chavdarov (from Germanea Sapareva Banya)
10	MF	BUL	Martin Gaziev (from Pirin Gotse Delchev)
15	DF	BUL	Stanislav Katrankov (from Sozopol)
22	FW	BUL	Tsvetan Varsanov (from Pirin Blagoevgrad)
23	GK	BUL	Diyan Valkov (on loan from Slavia Sofia)
24	MF	BUL	Veselin Vasev (from Minyor Pernik)

Out:

No.	Pos.	Nation	Player
1	GK	BUL	Martin Lukov (to Oborishte)
5	DF	BUL	Evgeni Tuntev (to Pirin Blagoevgrad)
7	FW	BUL	Vladimir Kaptiev (to Oborishte)
15	DF	BUL	Atanas Spiriev (to Belasitsa Petrich)
19	MF	BUL	Denis Nikolov (released)
20	DF	BUL	Martin Sechkov (to Lokomotiv Plovdiv)

=== Rakovski 2011 ===
In:

No.	Pos.	Nation	Player

Out:

No.	Pos.	Nation	Player
1	GK	BUL	Dimitar Grabchev (released)
4	MF	BUL	Peyo Batinov (released)
5	DF	BUL	Nikolay Domakinov (to Sozopol)
8	MF	BUL	Antonio Tsankov (released)
9	FW	BUL	Tsvetan Pavlov (to Bansko)
11	MF	BUL	Zapryan Zapryanov (released)
12	GK	BUL	Kiril Akalski (to Haskovo)
15	DF	BUL	Iliyan Enchev (to Oborishte)
17	MF	BUL	Dobrin Orlovski (released)
18	MF	BUL	Tsvetelin Tonev (to Botev Vratsa)
20	FW	BUL	Petar Atanasov (to Slavia Sofia)

=== Septemvri Simitli ===
In:

No.	Pos.	Nation	Player
—	GK	BUL	Aleksandar Lyubenov (on loan from Levski Sofia)
—	GK	BUL	Stoyan Vasev (Free agent)
—	DF	BUL	Lyubomir Iliev (on loan from Levski Sofia)
—	DF	BUL	Lyubomir Gutsev (from Chernomorets Burgas)
—	MF	BUL	Todor Trayanov (from Pirin Blagoevgrad)
—	MF	SRB	Nikola Radulović (from Spartak Varna)

Out:

No.	Pos.	Nation	Player
4	DF	BUL	Anton Todorov (retired)
12	GK	BUL	Vladislav Mitev (to (Sweden) BK Forward)
14	MF	BUL	Velizar Popvasilev (retired)
18	FW	BUL	Petar Yankulski (to Germanea Sapareva Banya)

=== Sozopol ===
In:

No.	Pos.	Nation	Player
7	DF	BUL	Nikolay Domakinov (from Rakovski)
9	FW	BUL	Vasil Tachev (from Chernomorets Balchik)
15	FW	BUL	Petar Kolev (from PFC Burgas)
16	DF	BUL	Stoyan Mantarov (from PFC Burgas)
69	DF	BUL	Georgi Hashev (from (Finland) Korsholm)
88	GK	BUL	Svilen Notev (from Pomorie)

Out:

No.	Pos.	Nation	Player
1	GK	BUL	Stoyan Stoyanov (released)
4	MF	BUL	Plamen Kolev (released)
6	FW	BUL	Redzheb Halil (to Botev Galabovo)
7	MF	BUL	Simeon Baev (to Vereya)
9	FW	BUL	Tihomir Kanev (to Etar Veliko Tarnovo)
12	GK	BUL	Eduard Mechikyan (to Haskovo)
14	DF	BUL	Stanislav Katrankov (to Pirin Razlog)
18	FW	BUL	Kristiyan Vatralev (released)

=== Spartak Varna ===
In:

No.	Pos.	Nation	Player

Out:

No.	Pos.	Nation	Player
1	GK	BUL	Ivaylo Krusharski (released)
6	DF	BUL	Daniel Haralambov (released)
7	FW	BUL	Diyan Malchev (released)
9	FW	BUL	Plamen Ivanov (released)
10	FW	BUL	Orlin Orlinov (released)
11	MF	BUL	Slavomir Sabkov (released)
14	FW	BUL	Evtim Dimitrov (released)
15	MF	BUL	Nikolay Chipev (released)
18	DF	BUL	Ronald Donev (released)
20	FW	BUL	Stanimir Dimitrov (released)
22	DF	BUL	Chris Yonev (released)
25	MF	SRB	Nikola Radulović (to Septemvri Simitli)
29	FW	BUL	Ognyan Stefanov (released)
33	GK	BUL	Filip Dimitrov (loan return to Botev Plovdiv)
37	DF	BUL	Petar Petrov (released)
74	MF	BUL	Krasimir Iliev (to Bansko)

=== Vereya ===
In:

No.	Pos.	Nation	Player
7	FW	BUL	Georgi Stefanov (from Lokomotiv Plovdiv)
9	MF	BUL	Todor Timonov (Free agent)
11	FW	CIV	Anderson Banvo (Free agent)
13	MF	BUL	Ivan Vinkov (from Botev Galabovo)
14	MF	BUL	Angel Zdravchev (on loan from Litex Lovech)
15	DF	BUL	Denis Pidev (from Marek Dupnitsa)
22	GK	BUL	Emil Danchev (from Haskovo)
39	DF	BUL	Emil Grozev (from Litex Lovech)
97	MF	BUL	Simeon Baev (from Sozopol)

Out:

No.	Pos.	Nation	Player
9	FW	BDI	Jonathan Nanizayamo (to (France) Tours)
11	MF	ALG	Billel Abdelkadous (released)
12	GK	BUL	Miroslav Grigorov (to Slivnishki Geroy)
14	MF	BUL	Nikolay Kirov (to Dimitrovgrad)
15	MF	BUL	Konstantin Atanasov (to FC Eurocollege)
16	DF	BUL	Todor Dinchev (to Rozova Dolina)
17	DF	BUL	Nikolay Kostov (to Nesebar)
18	MF	BUL	Mihail Lalev (released)
20	MF	BUL	Petar Kazakov (to Dobrudzha Dobrich)
45	MF	BUL	Isus Angelov (to Botev Galabovo)
