= List of Bulgarian football transfers summer 2015 =

This is a list of Bulgarian football transfers for the 2015 summer transfer window. Only transfers involving a team from the A Group and B Group are listed.

== A Group ==
=== Beroe ===
In:

No.	Pos.	Nation	Player
4	DF	BUL	Venelin Filipov (from Lokomotiv Plovdiv)
10	FW	BUL	Ismail Isa (from (Moldova) Sheriff Tiraspol)
14	FW	BUL	Georgi Bozhilov (from Cherno More)
17	MF	BUL	Ivan Kokonov (from Cherno More)
19	FW	BUL	Ivelin Iliev (from Vereya)
20	MF	SRB	Nemanja Milisavljević (from CSKA Sofia)
24	DF	BUL	Ventsislav Vasilev (from CSKA Sofia)
70	MF	BRA	Tom (from Lokomotiv Sofia)
73	MF	BUL	Steven Petkov (Free agent)
77	FW	BUL	Spas Delev (from Lokomotiv Plovdiv)

Out:

No.	Pos.	Nation	Player
2	DF	LTU	Valdemar Borovskij (end of contract)
4	MF	FRA	Alassane N'Diaye (to (Kazakhstan) Irtysh Pavlodar)
5	DF	BUL	Tanko Dyakov (released)
8	MF	BUL	Samir Ayass (to CSKA Sofia)
10	FW	COD	Junior Mapuku (to (Egypt) Wadi Degla)
11	MF	FRA	Chris Gadi (to (Portugal) Atlético CP)
19	DF	BUL	Plamen Tenev (on loan to Spartak Pleven)
25	MF	BUL	Dimo Bakalov (to Lokomotiv Plovdiv)
70	MF	BUL	Georgi Kostadinov (to Levski Sofia)
77	MF	GER	Savio Nsereko (end of contract)

=== Botev Plovdiv ===
In:

No.	Pos.	Nation	Player
1	GK	BRA	Victor Golas (from (Portugal) Braga)
20	MF	URU	Nicolas Varela (from (Greece) Zakynthos)
23	MF	NED	Gregory Nelson (from (Ukraine) Metalurh Donetsk)
39	FW	BUL	Dimitar Aleksiev (from Haskovo)
66	DF	BUL	Orlin Starokin (from (Romania) Dinamo București)
84	GK	BUL	Valentin Galev (from Lokomotiv Sofia)
91	FW	FRA	Rahavi Kifouéti (from (France) Luçon)
96	MF	BUL	Daniel Genov (from Lokomotiv Sofia)
99	FW	COD	Joël Tshibamba (from (Greece) AEL)

Out:

No.	Pos.	Nation	Player
1	GK	POL	Adam Stachowiak (to (Turkey) Gaziantep BB)
3	DF	FRA	Romain Inez (released)
16	MF	CZE	Tomáš Jirsák (to (Kazakhstan) Irtysh Pavlodar)
19	FW	BUL	Ivan Tsvetkov (retired)
21	GK	BUL	Filip Dimitrov (released)
23	FW	BUL	Tsvetelin Chunchukov (to Ludogorets Razgrad)
25	GK	BUL	Stamen Boyadzhiev (on loan to (Italy) Venezia)
37	DF	BUL	Rosen Kolev (to (Russia) Volga Nizhny Novgorod)
48	MF	BUL	Borimir Karamfilov (to Ludogorets Razgrad II)
77	MF	BUL	Momchil Tsvetanov (to CSKA Sofia)
89	GK	BUL	Mihail Ivanov (released)
95	MF	BUL	Stanislav Dryanov (to Neftochimic Burgas)
—	MF	BUL	Emil Kamberov (on loan to Lokomotiv GO)
—	FW	CGO	Férébory Doré (to (France) Angers, previously on loan at (Romania) CFR Cluj)

=== Cherno More ===
In:

No.	Pos.	Nation	Player
14	FW	ARG	Juan Varea (from (Bosnia and Herzegovina) Željezničar Sarajevo)
15	DF	BUL	Trayan Trayanov (from Lokomotiv Sofia)
21	MF	FRA	Mehdi Bourabia (from Lokomotiv Plovdiv)
23	DF	POR	Ginho (from (Portugal) Aves)
70	DF	POR	Pedro Eugénio (from Haskovo)
77	MF	BUL	Andreas Vasev (from Dunav Ruse)

Out:

No.	Pos.	Nation	Player
6	DF	BUL	Kiril Kotev (to Lokomotiv Plovdiv)
14	FW	BUL	Georgi Bozhilov (to Beroe Stara Zagora)
15	MF	BUL	Petar Zlatinov (released)
17	MF	BUL	Ivan Kokonov (to Beroe Stara Zagora)
22	MF	COL	Sebastián Hernández (loan return to Ludogorets Razgrad)
24	DF	BUL	Slavi Stalev (to Dobrudzha Dobrich)
28	DF	BUL	Toni Stoichkov (to Botev Ihtiman)
91	DF	BUL	Zhivko Atanasov (to Slavia Sofia)

=== Levski Sofia ===
In:

No.	Pos.	Nation	Player
7	MF	MKD	Denis Mahmudov (from (Netherlands) PEC Zwolle)
8	MF	CUW	Jeremy de Nooijer (from (Netherlands) Sparta Rotterdam)
9	FW	BUL	Atanas Kurdov (from (Kazakhstan) FC Astana)
11	FW	FRA	Oumar Diaby (from (Slovakia) Košice)
20	DF	BUL	Zhivko Milanov (from (Russia) Tom Tomsk)
24	GK	BUL	Aleksandar Lyubenov (loan return from Septemvri Simitli)
30	DF	AUT	Maximilian Karner (from (Austria) SV Grödig)
55	DF	BUL	Yordan Miliev (from (North Macedonia) FK Shkëndija)
70	MF	BUL	Georgi Kostadinov (from Beroe Stara Zagora)
99	MF	FRA	Lynel Kitambala (from (Belgium) Charleroi)

Out:

No.	Pos.	Nation	Player
5	DF	BUL	Borislav Stoychev (to (Greece) Atromitos)
7	MF	NOR	Liban Abdi (loan return to (Turkey) Çaykur Rizespor)
8	MF	BUL	Georgi Sarmov (to (Romania) Poli Timișoara)
9	FW	POL	Łukasz Gikiewicz (to (Saudi Arabia) Al-Wehda)
11	MF	NED	Luís Pedro (to (Romania) Târgu Mureș)
17	FW	BUL	Valeri Domovchiyski (to (Greece) Levadiakos)
20	FW	ESP	Añete (to (Azerbaijan) Neftchi Baku)
23	GK	BUL	Plamen Iliev (to (Romania) Botoșani)
31	DF	ROU	Emil Ninu (to (Cyprus) AEK Larnaca)
77	MF	BUL	Stefan Velev (to Lokomotiv Plovdiv)

=== Litex Lovech ===
In:

No.	Pos.	Nation	Player
6	MF	BUL	Krasimir Stanoev (loan return from Pirin Blagoevgrad)
7	MF	POR	Diogo Viana (from (Portugal) Gil Vicente)
10	MF	COL	Henry Rojas (from (Colombia) Alianza Petrolera)
17	MF	BUL	Reyan Daskalov (loan return from Chernomorets Burgas)
69	DF	FRA	Helton Dos Reis (from Lokomotiv Sofia)
77	MF	POR	Arsénio (from (Portugal) Moreirense)

Out:

No.	Pos.	Nation	Player
1	GK	BUL	Marin Orlinov (on loan to Spartak Pleven)
10	MF	POR	Paulo Regula (loan return to (Portugal) Olhanense)
13	DF	BUL	Vasil Bozhikov (to (Turkey) Kasımpaşa)

=== Lokomotiv Plovdiv ===
In:

No.	Pos.	Nation	Player
3	DF	BUL	Aleksandar Tunchev (from CSKA Sofia)
5	DF	BUL	Nikolay Dimitrov (from Chernomorets Burgas)
6	DF	BUL	Kiril Kotev (from Cherno More Varna)
10	MF	BUL	Iliyan Yordanov (from (Turkey) Denizlispor)
13	GK	BUL	Kristiyan Katsarev (from Lokomotiv Sofia)
16	GK	MAR	Yassine El Kharroubi (from Vereya)
19	MF	BUL	Dimitar Velkovski (from Lokomotiv Sofia)
22	MF	BUL	Ivaylo Ivanov (from Chernomorets Burgas)
23	MF	FRA	Loïc Dufau (from (France) Vendée Poiré-sur-Vie)
25	DF	BUL	Krum Stoyanov (from Slavia Sofia)
27	MF	BUL	Dimo Bakalov (from Beroe Stara Zagora)
28	FW	MKD	Zoran Baldovaliev (from (Greece) Olympiacos Volos)
32	MF	BUL	Emil Gargorov (from Lokomotiv Sofia)
71	DF	BUL	Plamen Krumov (from Slavia Sofia)
77	MF	BUL	Stefan Velev (from Levski Sofia)
90	MF	NIG	Olivier Bonnes (from Vereya)

Out:

No.	Pos.	Nation	Player
2	DF	BUL	Radoslav Dimitrov (to (Romania) Botoşani)
3	MF	BEL	Emmerik De Vriese (to (Cyprus) Ethnikos Achna)
4	DF	BUL	Venelin Filipov (to Beroe Stara Zagora)
6	DF	BUL	Martin Sechkov (to Septemvri Simitli)
7	FW	BUL	Branimir Kostadinov (to Dunav Ruse)
10	MF	BUL	Aleksandar Yakimov (to Pirin Blagoevgrad)
12	GK	BUL	Yordan Gospodinov (to Neftochimic Burgas)
15	DF	BUL	Aleksandar Goranov (to Sozopol)
16	MF	FRA	Mehdi Bourabia (to Cherno More)
17	DF	BUL	Bogomil Dyakov (to Pirin Blagoevgrad)
19	MF	BUL	Shaban Osmanov (to Asenovets)
20	DF	BUL	Diyan Moldovanov (to Nesebar)
22	MF	BUL	Yanko Sandanski (to Pirin Blagoevgrad)
25	FW	BUL	Spas Delev (to Beroe Stara Zagora)
84	DF	BUL	Zdravko Iliev (to Vereya)

=== Ludogorets Razgrad ===
In:

No.	Pos.	Nation	Player
1	GK	CAN	Milan Borjan (from (Serbia) Radnički Niš)
4	DF	BRA	Cicinho (from (Brazil) Santos)
6	DF	BRA	Natanael (from (Brazil) Atlético Paranaense)
8	MF	BRA	Lucas Sasha (from (Israel) Hapoel Tel Aviv)
17	FW	BUL	Tsvetelin Chunchukov (from Botev Plovdiv)
22	MF	BRA	Jonathan Cafu (from (Brazil) São Paulo)
28	FW	ROU	Claudiu Keșerü (from (Qatar) Al-Gharafa)
30	MF	ROU	Andrei Prepeliță (from (Romania) Steaua București)
92	MF	COD	Jody Lukoki (from (Netherlands) PEC Zwolle)

Out:

No.	Pos.	Nation	Player
5	DF	FRA	Alexandre Barthe (to (Switzerland) Grasshoppers)
8	MF	POR	Fábio Espinho (to (Spain) Málaga)
9	FW	SVN	Roman Bezjak (to (Croatia) Rijeka)
10	MF	COL	Sebastián Hernández (to (Turkey) Boluspor, previously on loan at Cherno More)
17	MF	ESP	Dani Abalo (to (Turkey) Sivasspor)
23	MF	BUL	Hristo Zlatinski (to (Romania) Universitatea Craiova)
80	DF	BRA	Júnior Caiçara (to (Germany) Schalke 04)
99	FW	TUN	Hamza Younés (on loan to (Iran) Tractor Sazi)

=== Montana ===
In:

No.	Pos.	Nation	Player
9	FW	BUL	Atanas Iliev (from Dobrudzha Dobrich)
10	MF	ALB	Albi Dosti (from (Albania) FK Kukësi)
14	MF	BUL	Lyubomir Genchev (from Lokomotiv GO)
19	FW	SVN	Matej Poplatnik (from (Slovenia) Triglav Kranj)
25	MF	BUL	Stanislav Genchev (from Slavia Sofia)
26	DF	BUL	Yordan Todorov (from Lokomotiv Sofia)

Out:

No.	Pos.	Nation	Player
9	FW	BUL	Miroslav Antonov (to (Israel) Maccabi Yavne)
13	DF	BUL	Raif Muradov (to Botev Vratsa)
14	MF	BUL	Nikolay Nikolov (to Kariana Erden)
19	FW	BUL	Ivan Tsachev (to Neftochimic Burgas)
20	MF	BUL	Erik Pochanski (to Ludogorets Razgrad II)

=== Pirin Blagoevgrad ===
In:

No.	Pos.	Nation	Player
1	GK	BUL	Nikolay Bankov (from Haskovo)
5	DF	BUL	Aleksandar Dyulgerov (from (Romania) Concordia Chiajna)
9	MF	BUL	Todor Trayanov (loan return from Septemvri Simitli)
11	MF	BRA	Edenilson Bergonsi (from CSKA Sofia)
16	MF	BUL	Ventsislav Bengyuzov (from Bansko)
17	MF	BUL	Iliya Karapetrov (from Lokomotiv GO)
20	MF	BUL	Yanko Sandanski (from Lokomotiv Plovdiv)
22	DF	BUL	Bogomil Dyakov (from Lokomotiv Plovdiv)
26	MF	BUL	Aleksandar Yakimov (from Lokomotiv Plovdiv)
28	MF	BUL	Marquinhos (from CSKA Sofia)
33	DF	BUL	Emil Viyachki (from Marek Dupnitsa)

Out:

No.	Pos.	Nation	Player
1	GK	BUL	Hristo Bahtarliev (to Belasitsa Petrich)
4	MF	BUL	Vasil Tudzharov (to Bansko)
5	MF	BUL	Lyuboslav Voynov (released)
6	MF	BUL	Krasimir Stanoev (loan return to Litex Lovech)
9	FW	BUL	Vladislav Zlatinov (released)
11	MF	BUL	Petar Tonchev (to Septemvri Sofia)
13	DF	BUL	Andrey Stoev (released)
17	MF	BUL	Atanas Chipilov (to Bansko)
19	DF	BUL	Boris Sandev (to Pirin Gotse Delchev)
20	MF	MKD	Dragi Kotsev (released)
26	DF	BUL	Evgeni Tuntev (to Pirin Razlog)
27	MF	BUL	Lyubomir Vitanov (to Bansko)

=== Slavia Sofia ===
In:

No.	Pos.	Nation	Player
2	DF	BUL	Martin Dechev (from Oborishte)
6	DF	BUL	Zhivko Atanasov (from Cherno More)
9	FW	FRA	Mathieu Manset (from (England) Cheltenham Town)
11	MF	FRA	Daudet N'Dongala (from (France) Nantes)
27	DF	BUL	Emil Martinov (Free agent)
32	GK	GRE	Antonis Stergiakis (from (Greece) Thyella Filotas)
66	DF	BUL	Plamen Krachunov (from CSKA Sofia)
71	MF	BUL	Anton Karachanakov (from (Russia) Baltika Kaliningrad)

Out:

No.	Pos.	Nation	Player
6	DF	CTA	Fernander Kassaï (on loan to (Kazakhstan) Irtysh Pavlodar)
8	MF	BUL	Stanislav Genchev (to Montana)
12	GK	BUL	Emil Petrov (to Septemvri Sofia)
26	DF	BUL	Dimitar Vezalov (to Bansko)
32	GK	BUL	Diyan Valkov (on loan to Vereya, previously on loan at Pirin Razlog)
33	MF	POR	Carlos Fonseca (on loan to (Kazakhstan) Irtysh Pavlodar)
45	MF	BUL	Slavcho Shokolarov (to Pomorie)
70	DF	BUL	Plamen Krumov (to Lokomotiv Plovdiv)
75	DF	BUL	Miroslav Ivanov (released)
88	DF	BUL	Angel Granchov (to CSKA Sofia)
91	DF	BUL	Krum Stoyanov (to Lokomotiv Plovdiv)

== B Group ==
=== Bansko ===
In:

No.	Pos.	Nation	Player
1	GK	BUL	Bozhidar Stoychev (Free agent)
4	MF	BUL	Vasil Tudzharov (from Pirin Blagoevgrad)
11	MF	BUL	Atanas Chipilov (from Pirin Blagoevgrad)
13	DF	BUL	Dimitar Vezalov (from Slavia Sofia)
18	FW	BUL	Georgi Rizov (from (Greece) Apollon Arnaia)
24	MF	BUL	Lyubomir Vitanov (from Pirin Blagoevgrad)

Out:

No.	Pos.	Nation	Player
1	GK	BUL	Plamen Kolev (to Lokomotiv GO)
9	FW	BUL	Viktor Shishkov (to Pirin Razlog)
10	MF	BUL	Ventsislav Bengyuzov (to Pirin Blagoevgrad)
11	MF	BUL	Mario Bliznakov (to Pirin Gotse Delchev)
15	DF	BUL	Mihail Minkov (to Etar Veliko Tarnovo)
17	DF	BUL	Slavi Shopov (to Karnobat)
20	MF	BUL	Bogomil Hristov (to Spartak Pleven)

=== Botev Galabovo ===
In:

No.	Pos.	Nation	Player
5	DF	BUL	Beysim Beysim (from Haskovo)
23	MF	BUL	Nikola Grozdanov (from Beroe U21)
27	DF	BUL	Stanislav Katrankov (from Pirin Razlog)
31	GK	BUL	Pavel Kolev (from Sliven 2000)
77	DF	BUL	Atanas Krastev (from Haskovo)

Out:

No.	Pos.	Nation	Player
5	DF	BUL	Yanko Valkanov (to (Kazakhstan) Akzhayik)
6	MF	BUL	Milen Zhelev (to Lokomotiv GO)
91	GK	BUL	Dimitar Georgiev (to Maritsa Plovdiv)

=== Dobrudzha Dobrich ===
In:

No.	Pos.	Nation	Player
7	MF	BUL	Pavel Petkov (from Marek Dupnitsa)
9	FW	BUL	Iliyan Chavdarov (from Pirin Razlog)
10	MF	BUL	Galin Dimov (from Chernomorets Burgas)
17	MF	BUL	Todor Kolev (from Marek Dupnitsa)
18	MF	BUL	Petko Tsankov (from Kaliakra Kavarna)
31	DF	BUL	Nikolay Iliev (from Suvorovo)
33	DF	BUL	Slavi Stalev (from Cherno More)
83	MF	BUL	Emil Koparanov (from Etar Veliko Tarnovo)
94	DF	BUL	Aleksandar Yovchev (from Cherno More U21)

Out:

No.	Pos.	Nation	Player
3	DF	BUL	Georgi Peychev (to Spartak Pleven)
7	MF	BUL	Radoy Bozhilov (loan return to CSKA Sofia)
8	MF	BUL	Georgi Dimitrov (to (Greece) Apollon Arnaia)
9	FW	BUL	Filip Filchev (to Septemvri Tervel)
10	MF	BUL	Valentin Veselinov (to Chernomorets Balchik)
11	MF	BUL	Nikolay Petrov (to Vereya)
19	MF	BUL	Aleksandar Dimitrov (to Velbazhd Kyustendil)
99	FW	BUL	Atanas Iliev (to Montana)

=== Dunav Ruse ===
In:

No.	Pos.	Nation	Player
1	GK	BUL	Martin Lukov (from Oborishte)
3	DF	BUL	Mario Petkov (from Slavia Sofia U19)
4	DF	BUL	Petar Patev (from Neftochimic Burgas)
16	DF	BUL	Martin Kovachev (from (Indonesia) Pusamania Borneo)
17	MF	BUL	Deyan Lozev (from Haskovo)
77	FW	BUL	Branimir Kostadinov (from Lokomotiv Plovdiv)
86	GK	BUL	Stanislav Antonov (from Spartak Pleven)
94	FW	BUL	Yuliyan Nenov (from Lokomotiv GO)

Out:

No.	Pos.	Nation	Player
3	DF	BUL	Martin Dimov (to Oborishte)
6	DF	BUL	Aleksandar Kasnedelchev (to FC Kubrat)
15	DF	BUL	Lyubomir Bulgurdzhiev (to Marisan Ruse)
16	MF	BUL	Veselin Vasilev (released)
17	MF	BUL	Andreas Vasev (to Cherno More)
19	MF	BUL	Dinko Stanchev (to Marisan Ruse)
23	DF	BUL	Martin Ivanov (to Marisan Ruse)
92	GK	BUL	Tsvetomir Tsankov (to Etar Veliko Tarnovo)

=== Litex Lovech II ===
In:

No.	Pos.	Nation	Player
2	MF	BUL	Stoycho Atanasov (from Chernomorets Burgas)
15	DF	BUL	Kristiyan Slavov (from CSKA Sofia)
17	MF	BUL	Aykut Ramadan (from CSKA Sofia)

Out:

No.	Pos.	Nation	Player

=== Lokomotiv GO ===
In:

No.	Pos.	Nation	Player
1	GK	BUL	Plamen Kolev (from Bansko)
7	MF	BUL	Martin Raynov (from Haskovo)
8	MF	BUL	Milen Zhelev (from Botev Galabovo)
10	FW	BUL	Tihomir Kanev (from Etar Veliko Tarnovo)
19	DF	BUL	Milen Savov (from Pavlikeni)
44	MF	BUL	Emil Kamberov (on loan from Botev Plovdiv)
77	FW	BUL	Martin Sandov (from Levski Sofia U19)
80	MF	BUL	Sava Savov (from CSKA Sofia U19)
93	FW	BUL	Dimitar Baydakov (from Etar Veliko Tarnovo)

Out:

No.	Pos.	Nation	Player
7	MF	BUL	Lyubomir Genchev (to Montana)
8	MF	BUL	Iliya Karapetrov (to Pirin Blagoevgrad)
10	FW	BUL	Yanaki Smirnov (to Ludogorets Razgrad II)
12	GK	BUL	Nikolay Mitev (retired)
20	MF	BUL	Miroslav Ivanov (to Etar Veliko Tarnovo)
23	MF	BUL	Yavor Genchev (to Etar Veliko Tarnovo)
80	MF	BUL	Radoslav Baychev (to Etar Veliko Tarnovo)
94	FW	BUL	Yuliyan Nenov (to Dunav Ruse)

=== Lokomotiv 2012 Mezdra ===
In:

No.	Pos.	Nation	Player
4	DF	BUL	Ivan Skerlev (from Haskovo)
7	MF	BUL	Denil Seliminski (from Chernomorets Burgas)
12	GK	BUL	Ivaylo Varganov (from Botev Kozloduy)
16	MF	BUL	Daniel Vasev (from Lokomotiv Sofia)
17	MF	BUL	Nikola Yanachkov (Free agent)
23	FW	BUL	Georgi Kakalov (from (Greece) Panelefsiniakos)
77	MF	BUL	Kiril Georgiev (Free agent)

Out:

No.	Pos.	Nation	Player
5	MF	BUL	Nikolay Tsvetkov (to CSKA Sofia)
7	FW	BUL	Georgi Vasilev (to Botev Vratsa)
16	DF	BUL	Hristo Popadiyn (to Ludogorets Razgrad II)
20	MF	BUL	Georgi Barbov (to Botev Ihtiman)
23	GK	BUL	Ivaylo Saykov (to Oborishte)
27	MF	BUL	Vlado Ivanov (released)
90	MF	BUL	Mihael Kisyov (to Septemvri Sofia)

=== Ludogorets Razgrad II ===
In:

No.	Pos.	Nation	Player
45	MF	BUL	Zlatko Bonev (from Marek Dupnitsa)
70	MF	BUL	Erik Pochanski (from Montana)
71	FW	BUL	Yanaki Smirnov (from Lokomotiv GO)
83	DF	BUL	Hristo Popadiyn (from Lokomotiv Mezdra)
95	MF	BUL	Borimir Karamfilov (from Botev Plovdiv U21)

Out:

No.	Pos.	Nation	Player

=== Neftochimic Burgas ===
In:

No.	Pos.	Nation	Player
9	MF	BUL	Andon Gushterov (from Septemvri Simitli)
11	MF	BUL	Stefan Nedelchev (from Litex Lovech U21)
12	GK	BUL	Petar Denchev (from (Uzbekistan) Navbahor Namangan)
15	DF	BUL	Dimitar Donchev (from Chernomorets Burgas)
18	DF	BUL	Rostislav Petrov (from Chernomorets Burgas)
19	FW	BUL	Ivan Tsachev (from Montana)
21	FW	BUL	Ivelin Vasilev (from Chernomorets Balchik)
22	DF	BUL	Tihomir Trifonov (from Haskovo)
32	MF	BUL	Stanislav Dryanov (from Botev Plovdiv)
44	GK	BUL	Yordan Gospodinov (from Lokomotiv Plovdiv)
77	MF	BUL	Valchan Chanev (from Haskovo)
88	MF	BUL	Simeon Baev (from Vereya)
99	FW	BUL	Borislav Borisov (from Chernomorets Burgas)

Out:

No.	Pos.	Nation	Player
1	GK	BUL	Hristiyan Slavov (to Chernomorets Burgas)
3	DF	BUL	Petar Patev (to Dunav Ruse)
5	DF	BUL	Stoyan Kalpakliev (to Chernomorets Burgas)
6	MF	BUL	Plamen Dimitrov (to Karnobat)
9	MF	BUL	Krasimir Iliev (released)
10	MF	BUL	Miroslav Radev (to Sozopol)
11	MF	BUL	Daniel Shmedin (to Slivnishki Geroy)
19	FW	BUL	Ahmed Ahmedov (to Pomorie)
44	GK	BUL	Georgi Stoyanov (released)
77	MF	BUL	Emanuil Manev (to Sozopol)
99	DF	BUL	Slavi Kostenski (to Karnobat)

=== Oborishte ===
In:

No.	Pos.	Nation	Player
2	DF	BUL	Petar Alyoshev (from Botev Vratsa)
3	DF	BUL	Martin Dimov (from Dunav Ruse)
4	DF	BUL	Ivan Ivanov (from Velbazhd Kyustendil)
5	DF	BUL	Martin Vasilev (from Vitosha Bistritsa)
6	DF	BUL	Ahmed Ademov (from Pirin Gotse Delchev)
8	FW	BUL	Ivan Kolev (from Rozova Dolina)
9	FW	BUL	Grigor Dolapchiev (from CSKA Sofia)
10	MF	BUL	Hristo Gogovski (from Pirin Gotse Delchev)
12	GK	BUL	Ivaylo Saykov (from Lokomotiv Mezdra)
16	MF	BUL	Kaloyan Tsvetkov (from Botev Vratsa)
17	DF	BUL	Ivaylo Dimitrov (from Chernomorets Burgas)
18	MF	BUL	Vladimir Baharov (from Vitosha Bistritsa)
20	DF	BUL	Murad Ibrahim (from Pirin Gotse Delchev)

Out:

No.	Pos.	Nation	Player
2	DF	BUL	Viktor Georgiev (released)
3	DF	BUL	Kristiyan Uzunov (to Vitosha Bistritsa)
6	DF	BUL	Georgi Georgiev (to Botev Vratsa)
7	MF	BUL	Denis Stoilov (released)
8	MF	BUL	Daniel Mladenov (to Septemvri Simitli)
9	FW	BUL	Stoyan Georgiev (to Vitosha Bistritsa)
10	DF	BUL	Georgi Ivanov (to Botev Vratsa)
12	GK	BUL	Martin Lukov (to Dunav Ruse)
14	MF	BUL	Deyan Borisov (to Botev Vratsa)
16	MF	BUL	Vasil Velev (to Lokomotiv Sofia)
17	MF	BUL	Hristo Bangeev (released)
19	DF	BUL	Iliyan Enchev (to Maritsa Plovdiv)
20	DF	BUL	Anton Kirov (to Minyor Pernik)
24	MF	BUL	Ivan Karamanov (released)

=== Pirin Razlog ===
In:

No.	Pos.	Nation	Player
5	DF	BUL	Evgeni Tuntev (from Pirin Blagoevgrad)
9	FW	BUL	Viktor Shishkov (from Bansko)
12	GK	BUL	Petar Debarliev (Free agent)
16	MF	BUL	Petar Lazarov (from Pirin Gotse Delchev)
19	FW	BUL	Dimitar Dimitrov (from Marek Dupnitsa)

Out:

No.	Pos.	Nation	Player
6	DF	BUL	Dimitar Nakov (to Belasitsa Petrich)
9	FW	BUL	Iliyan Chavdarov (to Dobrudzha Dobrich)
15	DF	BUL	Stanislav Katrankov (to Botev Galabovo)
23	GK	BUL	Diyan Valkov (loan return to Slavia Sofia)
24	MF	BUL	Veselin Vasev (to Vereya)

=== Pomorie ===
In:

No.	Pos.	Nation	Player
1	GK	BUL	Yanko Georgiev (from Chernomorets Burgas)
6	MF	BUL	Daniel Stamatov (from Chernomorets Burgas)
12	GK	BUL	Dimitar Todorov (from Chernomorets Burgas)
16	FW	BUL	Ahmed Ahmedov (from Neftochimic Burgas)
19	MF	BUL	Mihael Orachev (from Chernomorets Burgas)
20	MF	BUL	Kiril Georgiev (from Gigant Saedinenie)
21	MF	BUL	Milen Tanev (from Chernomorets Burgas)
22	MF	BUL	Slavcho Shokolarov (from Slavia Sofia)
26	MF	BUL	Yani Pehlivanov (from Chernomorets Burgas)

Out:

No.	Pos.	Nation	Player
1	GK	BUL	Daniel Zhelev (to Karnobat)
11	MF	BUL	Krasimir Pchelarov (retired)
13	FW	EGY	Abdulaziz Ibrahim (to Chernomorets Burgas)
20	MF	BUL	Stayko Staykov (retired)
21	MF	BUL	Stoyko Ivanov (to Pirin Gotse Delchev)
22	DF	BUL	Dimitar Kolarov (released)
24	DF	BUL	Petar Kehayov (released)
27	DF	BUL	Encho Lemperov (to Kaliakra Kavarna)

=== Septemvri Simitli ===
In:

No.	Pos.	Nation	Player
9	FW	BUL	Veselin Stoykov (from Mesta 2005)
12	GK	BUL	Abdi Abdikov (from (Cyprus) Karmiotissa)
16	MF	BUL	Dimitar Petkov (from Marek Dupnitsa)
55	MF	BUL	Martin Sechkov (from Lokomotiv Plovdiv)
87	MF	BUL	Daniel Mladenov (from Oborishte)
88	MF	BUL	Dimitar Iliev (from (Greece) Acharnaikos)

Out:

No.	Pos.	Nation	Player
9	MF	BUL	Andon Gushterov (to Neftochimic Burgas)
16	MF	BUL	Iliyan Iliev (to Minyor Pernik)

=== Sozopol ===
In:

No.	Pos.	Nation	Player
4	DF	BUL	Aleksandar Goranov (from Lokomotiv Plovdiv)
10	MF	BUL	Miroslav Radev (from Neftochimic Burgas)
12	MF	BUL	Emanuil Manev (from Neftochimic Burgas)
19	FW	BUL	Milen Dimov (from Chernomorets Burgas U19)
32	FW	BUL	Vasil Kaloyanov (from Bdin Vidin)
96	DF	BUL	Angel Marinov (from Cherno More U19)

Out:

No.	Pos.	Nation	Player
5	DF	BUL	Ivaylo Rusev (to Botev Vratsa)
7	DF	BUL	Nikolay Domakinov (released)
9	FW	BUL	Vasil Tachev (to Chernomorets Balchik)
10	MF	BUL	Teodor Stefanov (released)
14	FW	BUL	Lyubomir Tsekov (to Maritsa Plovdiv)
20	MF	BUL	Ventsislav Gyuzelev (to Maritsa Plovdiv)

=== Spartak Pleven ===
In:

No.	Pos.	Nation	Player
1	GK	BUL	Dimitar Pantev (from Akademik Svishtov)
2	DF	BUL	Plamen Tenev (on loan from Beroe Stara Zagora)
4	DF	BUL	Georgi Peychev (from Dobrudzha Dobrich)
7	MF	BUL	Nikolay Botev (from Botev Vratsa)
8	MF	BUL	Bogomil Hristov (from Bansko)
12	DF	BUL	Daniel Gergov (from Ludogorets Razgrad U19)
13	MF	BUL	Zhulien Benkov (from Beroe Stara Zagora U21)
16	MF	BUL	Ivan Dyankov (from Levski Sofia U19)
94	GK	BUL	Marin Orlinov (on loan from Litex Lovech)
—	MF	BUL	Lilyan Marinov (from Ludogorets Razgrad U19)
—	FW	BUL	Tsvetomir Todorov (from Bdin Vidin)

Out:

No.	Pos.	Nation	Player
1	GK	BUL	Radoslav Mihaylov (released)
4	DF	MKD	Robert Petrov (retired)
7	DF	BUL	Kaloyan Todorov (released)
8	DF	BUL	Petar Stoyanov (released)
11	MF	BUL	Lyubomir Ivanov (released)
14	DF	BUL	Lachezar Kanchev (released)
16	DF	BUL	Lyubomir Hristov (released)
21	MF	BUL	Ivaylo Dangurov (released)
22	MF	BUL	Ventsislav Milenov (released)
24	FW	BUL	Lyubomir Todorov (released)
86	GK	BUL	Stanislav Antonov (to Dunav Ruse)

=== Vereya ===
In:

No.	Pos.	Nation	Player
1	GK	BUL	Diyan Valkov (on loan from Slavia Sofia)
4	MF	BUL	Dimo Atanasov (from Marek Dupnitsa)
9	MF	BUL	Doncho Atanasov (from (Poland) Limanovia Limanowa)
14	DF	BUL	Atanas Lyubenov (Free agent)
15	MF	BUL	Ventsislav Ivanov (from Beroe Stara Zagora U19)
16	DF	BUL	Kostadin Stoyanov (Free agent)
18	FW	BUL	Deyan Hristov (from Chernomorets Burgas)
20	MF	BUL	Veselin Vasev (from Pirin Razlog)
21	DF	BUL	Zdravko Iliev (from Lokomotiv Plovdiv)
39	MF	BUL	Nikolay Petrov (from Dobrudzha Dobrich)
45	MF	BUL	Mitko Plahov (from Haskovo)
73	FW	BUL	Ivan Stoyanov (from CSKA Sofia)

Out:

No.	Pos.	Nation	Player
1	GK	MAR	Yassine El Kharroubi (to Lokomotiv Plovdiv)
4	DF	BUL	Tsvetelin Radev (released)
9	FW	CIV	Anderson Banvo (released)
12	GK	BUL	Asen Zhelev (released)
14	MF	BUL	Angel Zdravchev (loan return to Litex Lovech)
16	MF	BUL	Ivelin Iliev (to Beroe Stara Zagora)
19	MF	BUL	Stelian Evtimov (to Zagorets Nova Zagora)
21	MF	NIG	Olivier Bonnes (to Lokomotiv Plovdiv)
39	DF	BUL	Emil Grozev (released)
97	MF	BUL	Simeon Baev (to Neftochimic Burgas)
