= 2012–13 Bulgarian Cup =

Tournament details
- Country: Bulgaria

Final positions
- Champions: Beroe Stara Zagora (2nd cup)
- Runners-up: Levski Sofia

The 2012–13 Bulgarian Cup was the 31st official season of the Bulgarian annual football knockout tournament. The competition began on 13 October 2012 with the matches of the preliminary round and ended with the final on 15 May 2013. Ludogorets Razgrad were the defending champions, but were eliminated by CSKA Sofia in the second round. Beroe Stara Zagora won the title, their second overall, after defeating Levski Sofia in the final by penalties.

The winners of the competition, Beroe Stara Zagora, qualified for the second qualifying round of the 2013–14 UEFA Europa League.

== Participating clubs ==
The following teams competed in the cup:

2012–13 A Group all clubs	2012–13 B Group all clubs	Winners of 8 regional competitions
Ludogorets Razgrad; CSKA Sofia; Levski Sofia; Chernomorets Burgas; Litex Lovech; Lokomotiv Plovdiv; Cherno More Varna; Slavia Sofia; Minyor Pernik; Beroe Stara Zagora; Montana; Botev Vratsa; Lokomotiv Sofia; Etar Veliko Tarnovo; Pirin Gotse Delchev; Botev Plovdiv	Vidima-Rakovski Sevlievo; Kaliakra Kavarna; Svetkavitsa Targovishte; Neftochimic Burgas; Lyubimetz 2007; Bansko; Chavdar Etropole; Sliven 2000; Spartak Varna; Septemvri Simitli; Rakovski 2011; Shumen 2010; Spartak Pleven; Pirin Razlog	from North-West zone: Lokomotiv 1929 Mezdra; Akademik Svishtov; from North-East zone: Silistra 2009; Sportist General Toshevo; from South-East zone: Master Burgas; Eurocollege Plovdiv; from South-West zone: FC Strumska slava Radomir; Mesta Hadzhidimovo

== First round ==
The draw was conducted on 2 October 2012. The matches were played on 13 October 2012. On this stage the participants will be the 14 teams from the B PFG (second division) and the 8 winners from the regional amateur competitions. The team from the lower league has home advantage. Ten teams received a bye for the next round.

Note: Roman numerals in brackets denote the league tier the clubs participate in during the 2012–13 season.

Team 1	Score	Team 2
10 October 2012
Sliven 2000 (II)	1–5	Bansko (II)
13 October 2012
Pirin Razlog (II)	2–0	Svetkavitsa Targovishte (II)
Mesta Hadzhidimovo (III)	3−3 (a.e.t.) (1–3 p)	Spartak Pleven (II)
Spartak Varna (II)	2–1	Shumen 2010 (II)
Sportist General Toshevo (III)	1–3	Lokomotiv Mezdra (III)
Akademik Svishtov (III)	1–0	Septemvri Simitli (II)

== Second round ==
The draw was conducted on 18 October 2012. The first legs will be played on 30 October and 1 November 2012, the second legs are on 24 and 25 November 2012. On this stage the participants will be the 6 winners from the first round, the 10 teams, which receiveda bye and the 16 teams from A PFG (first division).

=== Summary ===
Note: Roman numerals in brackets denote the league tier the clubs participate in during the 2012–13 season.

Team 1	Agg.	Team 2	1st leg	2nd leg
Silistra 2009 (III)	2–4	Chavdar Etropole (II)	1–1	1–3
Minyor Pernik (I)	4–4 (a)	Etar Veliko Tarnovo (I)	2–1	2–3
Beroe Stara Zagora (I)	4–1	Akademik Svishtov (III)	1–0	3–1
Lokomotiv 1929 Mezdra (III)	5–4	Kaliakra Kavarna (II)	4–0	1–4 (a.e.t.)
Eurocollege Plovdiv (IV)	1–9	Botev Plovdiv (I)	0–3	1–6
Spartak Varna (II)	4–4 (5–4 p)	Rakovski 2011 (II)	2–2	2–2 (a.e.t.)
Pirin Gotse Delchev (I)	3–2	Montana (I)	3–2	0–0
Spartak Pleven (II)	0–9	Chernomorets Burgas (I)	0–4	0–5
Levski Sofia (I)	4–0	Pirin Razlog (II)	3–0	1–0
Botev Vratsa (I)	1–2	Neftochimic Burgas (II)	1–1	0–1
Lokomotiv Sofia (I)	3–3 (a)	Master Burgas (III)	2–0	1–3
Ludogorets Razgrad (I)	2–2 (a)	CSKA Sofia (I)	1–2	1–0
Bansko (II)	8–2	Vidima-Rakovski Sevlievo (II)	6–1	2–1
Lyubimetz 2007 (II)	2–5	Slavia Sofia (I)	2–2	0–3
FC Strumska slava Radomir (III)	0–2	Cherno More Varna (I)	0–0	0–2
Lokomotiv Plovdiv (I)	0–2	Litex Lovech (I)	0–0	0–2

=== First legs ===
30 October 2012	Spartak Varna	2−2	Rakovski 2011	Varna
15:00 EET	Dimitrov 18', 46'	Report	Dimov 31'; Genchev 71'	Stadium: Spartak; Referee: Stoyan Denev (Veliko Tarnovo)

30 October 2012	Bansko	6−1	Vidima-Rakovski Sevlievo	Bansko
15:00 EET	Nakov 8'; Georgiev 27'; N. Ivanov 33', 38'; Tonchev 58', 66'	Report	Ivanov 77'	Stadium: St. Peter; Referee: Petar Dzhuganski (Sofia)

30 October 2012	Eurocollege Plovdiv	0−3	Botev Plovdiv	Brestnik
17:00 EET		Report	Vranchev 22' (o.g.); Karaslavov 28'; Dyakov 87'	Stadium: Berkut; Referee: Milen Dimitrov (Stara Zagora)

31 October 2012	Silistra 2009	1–1	Chavdar Etropole	Silistra
15:00 EET	Cherneshkov 12'	Report	S. Dimitrov 35'	Stadium: Louis Eier; Referee: Mihail Yordanov (Razgrad)

31 October 2012	Minyor Pernik	2–1	Etar Veliko Tarnovo	Pernik
15:00 EET	Pavlov 17'; Mihov 85'	Report	Pivaty 42'	Stadium: Minyor; Referee: Nikola Popov (Sofia)

31 October 2012	Lokomotiv 1929 Mezdra	4–0	Kaliakra Kavarna	Mezdra
15:00 EET	Mishev 4', 53'; Stamenov 42'; Redovski 45'	Report		Stadium: Lokomotiv; Referee: Pavlin Tyutyundzhyan (Haskovo)

31 October 2012	Pirin Gotse Delchev	3–2	Montana	Gotse Delchev
15:00 EET	Panayotov 43'; Petrov 45'; Lazarov 86'	Report	Antonov 62'; Sechkov 89'	Stadium: Gradski; Referee: Vihren Manev (Sofia)

31 October 2012	Botev Vratsa	1–1	Neftochimic Burgas	Vratsa
15:00 EET	Atanasov 70'	Report	Nikolov 10'	Stadium: Hristo Botev; Referee: Tsvetan Krastev (Varna)

31 October 2012	Lokomotiv Sofia	2–0	Master Burgas	Sofia
15:00 EET	Iliev 34'; Dyulgerov 90'	Report		Stadium: Ovcha Kupel; Referee: Dimitar Burov (Sofia)

31 October 2012	Lyubimetz 2007	2–2	Slavia Sofia	Lyubimets
15:00 EET	Trifonov 12'; Dimov 52'	Report	Lazarov 46' (pen.); R. Dimitrov 90+4'	Stadium: Gradski; Referee: Martin Bogdev (Burgas)

31 October 2012	FC Strumska slava Radomir	0–0	Cherno More Varna	Radomir
15:00 EET		Report		Stadium: Gradski; Referee: Angel Bayaltsaliev (Sofia)

31 October 2012	Lokomotiv Plovdiv	0–0	Litex Lovech	Plovdiv
15:00 EET		Report		Stadium: Lokomotiv; Referee: Nikolay Yordanov (Sofia)

31 October 2012	Levski Sofia	3−0	Pirin Razlog	Sofia
17:00 EET	Cristovão 29'; Silva 57'; Yovov 79'	Report		Stadium: Georgi Asparuhov; Referee: Georgi Dimitrov (Sofia)

31 October 2012	Beroe Stara Zagora	1−0	Akademik Svishtov	Stara Zagora
18:00 EET	Martins 72' (pen.)	Report		Stadium: Beroe; Referee: Martin Aleksandrov (Sofia)

31 October 2012	Ludogorets Razgrad	1−2	CSKA Sofia	Razgrad
20:45 EET	Ivanov 11'	Report	Michel 34'; Sasha 61'	Stadium: Ludogorets Arena; Referee: Hristo Ristoskov (Blagoevgrad)

1 November 2012	Spartak Pleven	0−4	Chernomorets Burgas	Pleven
15:00 EET		Report	Yordanov 42'; Terziev 45'; Mladenov 56'; Ouattara 82'	Stadium: Pleven; Referee: Georgi Yordanov (Gabrovo)

=== Second legs ===
23 November 2012	Master Burgas	3−1 (3−3a agg.)	Lokomotiv Sofia	Balgarovo
13:00 EET	Rachev 17', 47'; Stoychev 77'	Report	Hristov 19'	Stadium: Balgarovo; Referee: Tsvetan Krastev (Varna)

23 November 2012	Slavia Sofia	3−0 (5−2 agg.)	Lyubimetz 2007	Sofia
13:00 EET	P. Dimitrov 3'; Kokonov 5'; Dimov 45' (o.g.)	Report		Stadium: Ovcha Kupel; Referee: Stefan Apostolov (Blagoevgrad)

23 November 2012	Akademik Svishtov	1−3 (1−4 agg.)	Beroe Stara Zagora	Svishtov
13:00 EET	Petrov 87'	Report	Sales 13', 75'; Caiado 40'	Stadium: Akademik; Referee: Dragomir Draganov (Sofia)

23 November 2012	Chernomorets Burgas	5−0 (9−0 agg.)	Spartak Pleven	Burgas
16:00 EET	Angelov 23', 65'; Boli 31'; Trifonov 38'; Mendes 87'	Report		Stadium: Lazur; Referee: Mihail Parushev (Varna)

23 November 2012	Litex Lovech	2−0 (2−0 agg.)	Lokomotiv Plovdiv	Lovech
17:30 EET	Isa 14'; G. Milanov 79' (pen.)	Report		Stadium: Lovech; Referee: Nikola Popov (Varna)

24 November 2012	Botev Plovdiv	6−1 (9−1 agg.)	Eurocollege Plovdiv	Brestnik
11:00 EET	Kostov 22', 29', 75'; Arthur Henrique 40'; Rahov 57'; Dyakov 80'	Report	Vasilev 69' (pen.)	Stadium: Berkut; Attendance: 750; Referee: Mihail Tsonev (Sofia)

24 November 2012	Rakovski 2011	2−2 (a.e.t.) (4−4 agg.) (4−5 p)	Spartak Varna	Rakovski
13:00 EET	Orlovski 76'; Dimov 79'	Report	S. Ivanov 6'; Kostadinov 51'	Stadium: Legia; Referee: Valentin Stanchev (Varna)

24 November 2012	Vidima-Rakovski Sevlievo	1−2 (2−8 agg.)	Bansko	Sevlievo
13:00 EET	Kozhuharov 50'	Report	Popev 76'; P.Tonchev 82'	Stadium: Rakovski; Referee: Adrian Petrov (Sofia)

24 November 2012	Chavdar Etropole	3−1 (4−2 agg.)	Silistra 2009	Etropole
13:00 EET	Chochev 63'; Etov 70'; Vasilev 77'	Report	25'	Stadium: Chavdar; Referee: Martin Stoimenov (Sofia)

24 November 2012	Etar Veliko Tarnovo	3−2 (4−4a agg.)	Minyor Pernik	Veliko Tarnovo
13:00 EET	K.Trifonov 43', 77', 90'	Report	Pavlov 23'; Vladinov 27'	Stadium: Ivaylo; Referee: Angel Bayaltsaliev (Sofia)

24 November 2012	Kaliakra Kavarna	4−1 (a.e.t.) (4−5 agg.)	Lokomotiv 1929 Mezdra	Kavarna
13:00 EET	S.Stanev 34'; Andonov 43'; Hristov 47'; Uzunov 86'	Report	Kamenov 92'	Stadium: Kavarna; Referee: Dimitar Zhelyazkov (Varna)

24 November 2012	Montana	0−0 (2−3 agg.)	Pirin Gotse Delchev	Montana
13:00 EET		Report		Stadium: Ogosta; Referee: Stoyan Denev (Veliko Tarnovo)

24 November 2012	Cherno More Varna	2−0 (2−0 agg.)	FC Strumska slava Radomir	Varna
13:00 EET	Kapitanov 15'; A.Iliev 82'	Report		Stadium: Ticha; Referee: Georgi Davidov (Veliko Tarnovo)

24 November 2012	Pirin Razlog	0−1 (0−4 agg.)	Levski Sofia	Razlog
13:00 EET		Report	João Silva 90'	Stadium: Gradski; Referee: Dragan Stoykov (Blagoevgrad)

24 November 2012	CSKA Sofia	0−1 (2a−2 agg.)	Ludogorets Razgrad	Sofia
13:30 EET		Report	Gargorov 78'	Stadium: Vasil Levski; Referee: Stanislav Todorov (Shumen)

24 November 2012	Neftochimic Burgas	1−0 (2−1 agg.)	Botev Vratsa	Dolno Ezerovo
16:30 EET	Andonov 6'	Report		Stadium: Cherveno Zname; Referee: Angel Angelov (Sofia)

== Third round ==
The draw was conducted on 26 November 2012. The first legs will be played on 2 and 3 December 2012, the second legs are on 15 and 16 December 2012. On this stage the participants will be the 16 winners from the second round.

=== Summary ===
Note: Roman numerals in brackets denote the league tier the clubs participate in during the 2012–13 season.

Team 1	Agg.	Team 2	1st leg	2nd leg
Lokomotiv Sofia (I)	3–2	Chernomorets Burgas (I)	3–1	0–1
Pirin Gotse Delchev (I)	2–1	Neftochimic Burgas (II)	1–0	1–1
Levski Sofia (I)	4–1	Cherno More Varna (I)	4–0	0–1
Slavia Sofia (I)	4–0	Botev Plovdiv (I)	3–0	1–0
Chavdar Etropole (II)	0–7	CSKA Sofia (I)	0–2	0–5
Bansko (II)	2–3	Minyor Pernik (I)	1–1	1–2
Spartak Varna (II)	1–8	Litex Lovech (I)	0–1	1–7
Beroe Stara Zagora (I)	8–1	Lokomotiv 1929 Mezdra (III)	4–0	4–1

=== First legs ===
2 December 2012	Slavia Sofia	3–0	Botev Plovdiv	Sofia
13:00 EET	Zhelev 14'; P. Dimitrov 43', 75'	Report		Stadium: Ovcha Kupel; Attendance: 580; Referee: Aleksandar Kostadinov (Sofia)

2 December 2012	Pirin Gotse Delchev	1–0	Neftochimic Burgas	Gotse Delchev
14:00 EET	Hazurov 74' (pen.)	Report		Stadium: Gradski; Attendance: 580; Referee: Georgi Yordanov (Gabrovo)

2 December 2012	Chavdar Etropole	0–2	CSKA Sofia	Etropole
14:00 EET		Report	Michel 29'; Anicet 89'	Stadium: Chavdar; Attendance: 3,400; Referee: Ivan Kirilov (Varna)

2 December 2012	Bansko	1–1	Minyor Pernik	Bansko
14:00 EET	S. Georgiev 78'	Report	Yurukov 14'	Stadium: St. Peter; Attendance: 410; Referee: Nikolay Yordanov (Sofia)

2 December 2012	Spartak Varna	0–1	Litex Lovech	Varna
14:00 EET		Report	G. Milanov 11'	Stadium: Spartak; Attendance: 870; Referee: Georgi Kabakov (Plovdiv)

2 December 2012	Beroe Stara Zagora	4–0	Lokomotiv 1929 Mezdra	Stara Zagora
14:00 EET	Caiado 29'; Martins 38'; Velev 66'; Andonov 90'	Report		Stadium: Beroe; Attendance: 250; Referee: Vladimir Valkov (Plovdiv)

2 December 2012	Levski Sofia	4–0	Cherno More Varna	Sofia
15:45 EET	Mulder 11', 51'; Silva 54', 75' (pen.)	Report		Stadium: Georgi Asparuhov; Attendance: 1,150; Referee: Stefan Spasov (Pernik)

3 December 2012	Lokomotiv Sofia	3–1	Chernomorets Burgas	Sofia
14:00 EET	Iliev 8'; Petrov 45'; Pavlov 75'	Report	Terziev 57'	Stadium: Ovcha Kupel; Attendance: 180; Referee: Radan Miryanov (Varna)

=== Second legs ===
12 December 2012	Litex Lovech	7−1 (8−1 agg.)	Spartak Varna	Lovech
13:00 EET	Zakov 19', 52', 75'; Isa 21', 38'; Kostadinov 44'; Vajushi 86'	Report	Dimitrov 57'	Stadium: Lovech; Attendance: 170; Referee: Angel Bayaltsaliev (Sofia)

15 December 2012	Chernomorets Burgas	1−0 (2−3 agg.)	Lokomotiv Sofia	Burgas
13:00 EET	Boli 12'	Report		Stadium: Lazur; Attendance: 500; Referee: Stanislav Todorov (Shumen)

15 December 2012	Cherno More Varna	1−0 (1−4 agg.)	Levski Sofia	Varna
13:00 EET	Kolev 69'	Report		Stadium: Ticha; Attendance: 2,090; Referee: Georgi Kabakov (Plovdiv)

15 December 2012	CSKA Sofia	5−0 (7−0 agg.)	Chavdar Etropole	Blagoevgrad
13:00 EET	Anicet 16'; Tássio 39', 50'; Priso 64'; Dolapchiev 87'	Report		Stadium: Hristo Botev; Attendance: 590; Referee: Georgi Dimitrov (Sofia)

15 December 2012	Minyor Pernik	2−1 (3−2 agg.)	Bansko	Pernik
13:00 EET	Brahimi 9'; Hadzhiev 51'	Report	Tonchev 28'	Stadium: Minyor; Attendance: 280; Referee: Georgi Ignatov (Sofia)

15 December 2012	Lokomotiv 1929 Mezdra	1−4 (1−8 agg.)	Beroe Stara Zagora	Mezdra
13:00 EET	Kamenov 50'	Report	Raynov 10', 82'; Hristov 48'; Martins 89'	Stadium: Lokomotiv; Attendance: 110; Referee: Vihren Manev (Sofia)

16 December 2012	Botev Plovdiv	0–1 (0–4 agg.)	Slavia Sofia	Plovdiv
13:00 EET		Report	Popara 33'	Stadium: Hristo Botev; Attendance: 3,300; Referee: Georgi Yordanov (Gabrovo)

16 December 2012	Neftochimic Burgas	1–1 (1–2 agg.)	Pirin Gotse Delchev	Nova Zagora
13:00 EET	R.Nikolov 87'	Report	Kotsev 24'	Stadium: Zagorets; Attendance: 330; Referee: Radoslav Stanev (Varna)

== Quarter-finals ==
The draw was conducted on 18 December 2012. On this stage the participants will be the 8 winners from the third round.

=== Summary ===
Note: Roman numerals in brackets denote the league tier the clubs participate in during the 2012–13 season.

Team 1	Agg.	Team 2	1st leg	2nd leg
Beroe Stara Zagora (I)	4–1	Pirin Gotse Delchev (I)	1–0	3–1
Levski Sofia (I)	2–2 (a)	Litex Lovech (I)	1–0	1–2
Lokomotiv Sofia (I)	1–0	CSKA Sofia (I)	0–0	1–0
Minyor Pernik (I)	3–5	Slavia Sofia (I)	2–5	1–0

=== First legs ===
13 March 2013	Lokomotiv Sofia	0−0	CSKA Sofia	Svoge
15:30 EET		Report		Stadium: Chavdar Tsvetkov; Attendance: 230; Referee: Aleksandar Kostadinov (Sofia)

13 March 2013	Minyor Pernik	2−5	Slavia Sofia	Pernik
15:30 EET	Petrov 64'; Yalamov 71'	Report	P. Dimitrov 11', 18'; Zhelev 34'; Livramento 50'; Lazarov 60'	Stadium: Minyor; Attendance: 1,040; Referee: Ivaylo Stoyanov (Petrich)

13 March 2013	Beroe Stara Zagora	1−0	Pirin Gotse Delchev	Stara Zagora
17:30 EET	Élio 25'	Report		Stadium: Beroe; Attendance: 1,670; Referee: Nikolay Yordanov (Sofia)

13 March 2013	Levski Sofia	1−0	Litex Lovech	Sofia
18:00 EET	Rodrigues 22'	Report		Stadium: Georgi Asparuhov; Attendance: closed doors Referee: Ahmed Ahmed (Burgas)

=== Second legs ===
3 April 2013	CSKA Sofia	0–1 (0–1 agg.)	Lokomotiv Sofia	Sofia
15:30 EET		Report	Peev 85' (pen.)	Stadium: Balgarska Armiya; Attendance: 550; Referee: Kalin Lyudmilov (Sofia)

3 April 2013	Pirin Gotse Delchev	1–3 (1–4 agg.)	Beroe Stara Zagora	Gotse Delchev
16:00 EET	Marchev 73'	Report	Elias 20'; Andonov 45+2'; Djoman 65'	Stadium: Gradski; Attendance: 900; Referee: Stefan Spasov (Pernik)

3 April 2013	Slavia Sofia	0–1 (5–3 agg.)	Minyor Pernik	Sofia
16:00 EET		Report	Okechukwu 88'	Stadium: Ovcha Kupel; Attendance: 150; Referee: Georgi Dimitrov (Sofia)

3 April 2013	Litex Lovech	2–1 (2–2a agg.)	Levski Sofia	Lovech
18:00 EET	Milanov 49'; Isa 75'	Report	Mulder 40'	Stadium: Lovech; Attendance: 5,500; Referee: Stanislav Todorov (Shumen)

== Semi-finals ==
The matches were played on 17 and 24 April 2013. At this stage the participants will be the four winners from the quarter-finals. The team from the lower league has home advantage.

=== Summary ===
Note: Roman numerals in brackets denote the league tier the clubs participated in during the 2012–13 season.

Team 1	Agg.	Team 2	1st leg	2nd leg
Slavia Sofia (I)	0–1	Beroe Stara Zagora (I)	0–0	0–1
Levski Sofia (I)	3–1	Lokomotiv Sofia (I)	3–1	0–0

=== First legs ===
17 April 2013	Levski Sofia	3−1	Lokomotiv Sofia	Sofia
17:45 EET	Rodrigues 62', 74'; Velev 83'	Report	Iliev 81'	Stadium: Georgi Asparuhov; Attendance: 1,250; Referee: Hristo Ristoskov (Blagoevgrad)

18 April 2013	Slavia Sofia	0–0	Beroe Stara Zagora	Sofia
15:30 EET		Report		Stadium: Ovcha Kupel; Attendance: 1,090; Referee: Tsvetan Krastev (Varna)

=== Second legs ===
24 April 2013	Lokomotiv Sofia	0−0 (1−3 agg.)	Levski Sofia	Sofia
15:30 EET		Report		Stadium: Lokomotiv; Attendance: 1,300; Referee: Nikola Popov (Sofia)

25 April 2013	Beroe Stara Zagora	1−0 (1−0 agg.)	Slavia Sofia	Stara Zagora
17:30 EET	Andonov 87'	Report		Stadium: Beroe; Attendance: 10,000; Referee: Georgi Kabakov (Plovdiv)

== Final ==
15 May 2013
17:30 EET

Beroe	3–3 (a.e.t.)	Levski Sofia
Martins 16', 28'; Andonov 79'	Report	Yordanov 24'; Silva 81'; Rodrigues 87'
Penalties
Sayoud (penalty missed); Ivanov (penalty scored); Krumov (penalty missed); Stoychev (penalty scored); Elias (penalty scored)	3–1	(penalty missed) Silva; (penalty missed) Mulder; (penalty missed) Velev; (penalty scored) Angelov

Gradski, Lovech
Attendance: 7,800
Referee: Tsvetan Krastev

== See also ==
- 2012–13 A Group
- 2012–13 B Group
- 2012–13 V AFG
