= Pedro Mendes =

Pedro Mendes may refer to:

== Footballers ==
- Pedro Mendes (footballer, born 1979), Portuguese retired midfielder born Pedro Miguel da Silva Mendes
- Pedro Mendes (footballer, born April 1990), Portuguese winger Pedro Miguel Alves Mendes
- Pedro Mendes (footballer, born May 1990), Brazilian forward born Pedro Ferreira-Mendes
- Pedro Mendes (footballer, born October 1990), Portuguese defender born Pedro Filipe Teodósio Mendes
- Pedro Mendes (footballer, born 1993), Portuguese midfielder born Pedro Rafael Amado Mendes
- Pedro Mendes (footballer, born 1999), Portuguese forward born Pedro Manuel Lobo Peixoto Mineiro Mendes

== Other ==
- Pedro Mendes (scientist), Portuguese computer scientist and professor
- Pedro Mendes (model) (born 1987), Swiss model and winner of Mister International 2015
