= FC Lokomotiv 1929 Mezdra =

Bulgarian football club

Lokomotiv 1929 Mezdra
- Full name: Football Club Lokomotiv 1929 Mezdra
- Nickname: Zheleznicharite ot Mezdra (The irons from Mezdra)
- Founded: 2011; 15 years ago
- Dissolved: 2016; 10 years ago
- Ground: Lokomotiv Stadium, Mezdra
- Capacity: 5 000
- 2015-2016: A RFG Vratsa, 2nd
Home colours	Away colours

Lokomotiv 1929 Mezdra (Bulgarian: Локомотив 1929 Мездра) was a Bulgarian football club from the city of Mezdra.

== History ==
The team was founded in 2011 before the dissolution of the original club PFC Lokomotiv Mezdra. In 2012 its promoted to V Group and got to the Third Round of the Bulgarian Cup, but it was drawn from V Group and sent to Regional Group.

In 2015, the team qualified again for the Bulgarian Cup, but lost in the First Round to the Bulgarian champion Ludogorets Razgrad.

== Past seasons ==
Season	League	Place	W	D	L	GF	GA	Pts	Bulgarian Cup
2011–12	A RFG (IV)	7	?	?	?	?	?	?	not qualified
2012–13	V AFG (III)	5	11	1	10	42	38	34	Third Round
2013–14	A RFG (IV)	7	7	1	12	41	57	22	not qualified
2014–15	A RFG	10	2	0	16	22	64	6	not qualified
2015–16	A RFG	2	21	1	4	108	30	64	First Round
Green marks a season followed by promotion, red a season followed by relegation.
