= Nikolay Hristozov (footballer) =

Bulgarian footballer (born 1982)

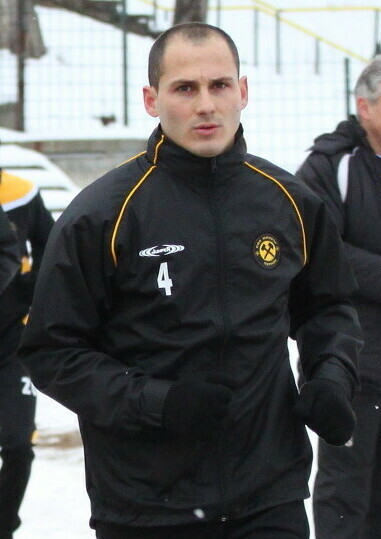
- Hristozov with Minyor Pernik in 2012

Personal information
- Full name: Nikolay Hristov Hristozov
- Date of birth: 6 March 1982 (age 44)
- Place of birth: Dimitrovgrad, Bulgaria
- Height: 1.80 m (5 ft 11 in)
- Position: Defender

Team information
- Current team: [[FC Slivnishki geroi]] (manager)

Youth career
- CSKA Sofia

Senior career*
Years	Team	Apps	(Gls)
2001–2004	Lokomotiv Sofia	8	(0)
2004–2006	Conegliano German	42	(0)
2006–2008	Vihren Sandanski	56	(1)
2008–2010	Lokomotiv Mezdra	57	(0)
2010–2012	Minyor Pernik	51	(0)
2013–2014	Dobrudzha Dobrich	49	(1)
2015–2016	Lokomotiv 2012 Mezdra	29	(0)
2016–2018	Vitosha Bistritsa	54	(2)
2019–2020	Balkan Botevgrad	1	(0)
Total		347	(4)

Managerial career
- 2018–2019: Vitosha Bistritsa (assistant)
- 2021–: Vitosha Bistritsa
- * Club domestic league appearances and goals as of 5 August 2019

Nikolay Hristozov (Bulgarian: Николай Христозов; born 6 March 1982) is a Bulgarian retired footballer who played as a defender. He is currently the manager of FC Slivnishki geroi.

== Career ==
Hristozov was raised in CSKA Sofia's youth teams. When he was nineteen, he signed with Lokomotiv Sofia, but in his three three seasons with the club, he played in only eight matches. In June 2004 he joined the ranks of Conegliano, who became joint champions of the second division in Bulgarian football one year later. Between 2006 and 2008, Hristozov played in the top division of Bulgarian football with Vihren. In May 2008, he signed with Lokomotiv Mezdra.

On 12 June 2018, Hristozov was appointed the assistant manager of Vitosha Bistritsa, who play in the third tier of Bulgarian amateur football. On 25 May 2021, it was announced that he had been promoted to the position of manager.
