= Angel Yusev =

Bulgarian footballer

Personal information
- Date of birth: 23 July 1988 (age 38)
- Place of birth: Bulgaria
- Height: 1.84 m (6 ft 1/2 in)
- Position: Goalkeeper

Youth career
- Pirin Gotse Delchev

Senior career*
Years	Team	Apps	(Gls)
2007–2014	Pirin Gotse Delchev	60	(0)
2014	Oborishte	6	(0)
2015	Botev Vratsa	5	(0)
2016	Pirin Gotse Delchev		
2017–2020	Bansko	9	(0)
2020–2021	Pirin Gotse Delchev		
- * Club domestic league appearances and goals as of 30 May 2017

Angel Yusev (Bulgarian: Ангел Юсев; born 23 July 1988) is a Bulgarian footballer who currently plays as a goalkeeper.

== Career ==
Yusev started the 2012–13 A PFG season in Pirin Gotse Delchev as an understudy to Abdi Abdikov. He made his A PFG debut on 2 March 2013, starting in goal in a 2–0 defeat to Minyor Pernik.

In the summer of 2015, Ysev began training with Lokomotiv Sofia, but eventually returned to Botev Vratsa after not being able to secure a contract with the "railwaymen".

In January 2017, Yusev joined Bansko.
