= Tencho Tenev =

Bulgarian football manager (born 1955)

Personal information
- Full name: Tencho Georgiev Tenev
- Date of birth: 9 May 1955 (age 71)
- Place of birth: Chirpan Bulgaria

Team information
- Current team: Marek Dupnitsa

Managerial career
- Years: Team
- 1991–1993: Borislav Parvomay
- 1993–1995: FC Chirpan
- 1998–2000: Spartak Plovdiv
- 2000–2001: Sokol Markovo
- 2002: Botev Plovdiv
- 2005–2006: Spartak Plovdiv
- 2006–2007: Lokomotiv Stara Zagora
- 2007: Maritsa Plovdiv
- 2007–2008: Botev Plovdiv
- 2008: Rodopa Smolyan
- 2009: Vihren Sandanski
- 2012–2013: Pirin Gotse Delchev
- 2014–2015: Marek Dupnitsa

Tencho Georgiev Tenev (Bulgarian: Тенчо Георгиев Тенев) (born 9 May 1955) is a Bulgarian football manager. He is currently manager of Marek Dupnitsa in the Bulgarian A Football Group.
