= Élio Martins =

Portuguese footballer

Personal information
- Full name: Élio Bruno Teixeira Martins
- Date of birth: 26 March 1985 (age 41)
- Place of birth: Machico, Portugal
- Height: 1.85 m (6 ft 1 in)
- Position: Forward

Youth career
- 1996–2004: Machico

Senior career*
Years	Team	Apps	(Gls)
2004–2008	Machico	46	(1)
2008–2009	Chaves	21	(2)
2009–2012	Beira-Mar	54	(6)
2010	→ Doxa (loan)	8	(0)
2012–2014	Beroe	37	(7)
2014–2016	Сокол Обручище	57	(18)
2016–2017	Akhaa Ahli	20	(11)
2017	PS TIRA	21	(11)
2018	Bhayangkara	10	(3)
2019	União Madeira	8	(2)
2019–2021	Machico	13	(5)
Total		295	(66)
- * Club domestic league appearances and goals

Élio Bruno Teixeira Martins (born 26 March 1985) is a Portuguese former professional footballer who plays for as a forward.

== Club career ==
Martins was born in Machico, Madeira. After years of playing in the lower leagues, especially with hometown club A.D. Machico, he reached the professionals in 2009–10, scoring six goals in 27 games as S.C. Beira-Mar promoted to the Primeira Liga as champions. After spending the first part of the 2010–11 campaign on loan to Cypriot team Doxa Katokopias FC he returned for a further two seasons in the top division, being all but played as a substitute.

On 27 June 2012, Martins signed with PFC Beroe Stara Zagora in Bulgaria, on a three-year contract. In his first season he netted seven times in the Bulgarian Cup, including a brace in the final against PFC Levski Sofia: the match finished in a 3–3 draw, but Beroe won 3–1 on penalties.

Martins returned to his country in the summer of 2014, netting a career-best 14 goals in his first season at C.F. União to help them return to top flight after two decades. On 24 April 2017, the 32-year old left Lebanon's Akhaa Ahli Aley FC and joined PS TIRA from the Liga 1 (Indonesia) on a one-year deal.

== Honours ==
Beira-Mar

- Segunda Liga: 2009–10

Beroe

- Bulgarian Cup: 2012–13
- Bulgarian Supercup: 2013
