= Radostin Stanev =

Bulgarian footballer (born 1975)

Personal information
- Full name: Radostin Lyubomirov Stanev
- Date of birth: 11 July 1975 (age 51)
- Place of birth: Varna, Bulgaria
- Height: 1.88 m (6 ft 2 in)
- Position: Goalkeeper

Team information
- Current team: Slavia Sofia (goalkeeping coach)

Youth career
- 1982–1994: Spartak Varna

Senior career*
Years	Team	Apps	(Gls)
1995–1997	Spartak Varna	52	(0)
1998	CSKA Sofia	12	(0)
1998–2001	Lokomotiv Sofia	51	(0)
2002–2003	Legia Warsaw	23	(0)
2003–2004	Shinnik Yaroslavl	16	(0)
2004–2006	Progresul București	14	(0)
2007	Aris Limassol	2	(0)
2008	Spartak Varna	11	(0)
2008–2009	Lokomotiv Mezdra	13	(0)
Total		194	(0)

Managerial career
- 2009–2011: Vihren Sandanski (goalkeeping coach)
- 2011–2013: Lokomotiv Plovdiv (goalkeeping coach)
- 2013: CSKA Sofia (goalkeeping coach)
- 2014–: Slavia Sofia (goalkeeping coach)
- * Club domestic league appearances and goals

Radostin Lyubomirov Stanev (Bulgarian: Радостин Станев; born 11 July 1975) is a Bulgarian former professional footballer who played as a goalkeeper. He is currently the goalkeeping coach of Slavia Sofia.

== Career ==
=== In Bulgaria ===
Stanev started his career in Varna in the local Spartak. In 1998, he played for six months in CSKA Sofia. After that, he signed with Lokomotiv Sofia. Between January 2008 and May 2008, Stanev played again in Spartak Varna. In June 2008, he signed with newly promoted Lokomotiv Mezdra.

=== Foreign clubs ===
In January 2002, Stanev signed with Polish club Legia Warsaw. The next year, he went to Russia and played one season for Shinnik Yaroslavl. In 2004, he signed with the Romanian Progresul București. In his first months in Romania, he grew at odds with his coach, and for two years played only in 14 matches. In June 2006, his contract with Progresul was terminated and he signed with Aris Limassol

== Honours ==
Legia Warsaw

- Ekstraklasa: 2001–02
- Polish League Cup: 2001–02
