= Yordan Bozdanski =

Bulgarian footballer & manager (born 1964)

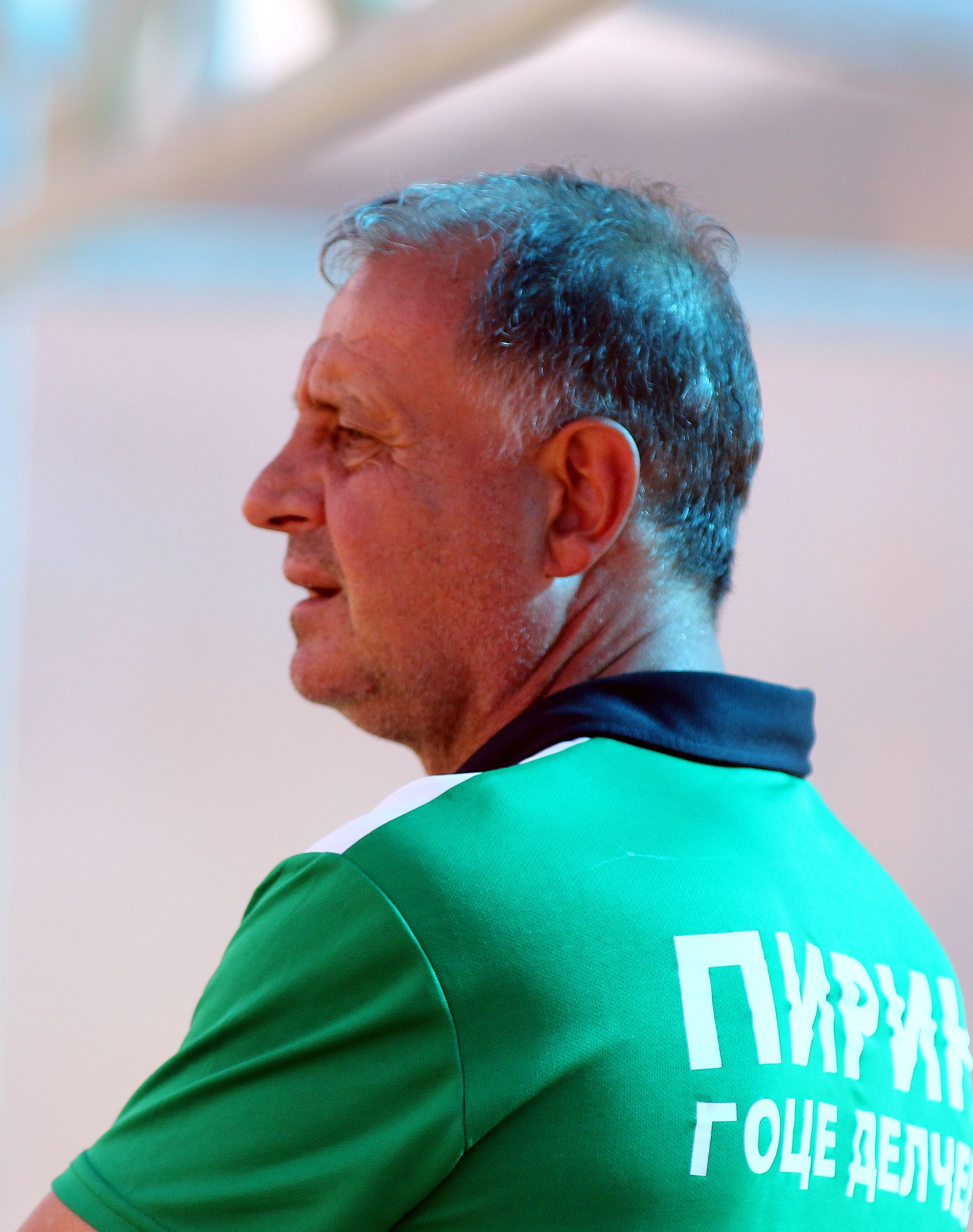

Personal information
- Full name: Yordan Angelov Bozdanski
- Date of birth: 7 October 1964 (age 62)
- Place of birth: Sandanski, Bulgaria
- Position: Forward

Senior career*
Years	Team	Apps	(Gls)
1981–1991	Pirin Blagoevgrad	191	(45)
1983–1984	→ Vihren Sandanski (loan)	34	(12)
1986–1987	→ Pirin GD (loan)	30	(14)
1991–1992	Ethnikos Piraeus	22	(4)
1992–1993	Las Palmas	9	(1)
1993–1994	Pirin Blagoevgrad	25	(7)
1994–1995	FK Maleš		
1995–1997	Pirin Blagoevgrad	72	(12)
1998–2001	Septemvri Simitli	61	(14)

International career
1993	Bulgaria	1	(0)

Managerial career
- 1998–2001: Septemvri Simitli
- 2001–2002: Pirin Blagoevgrad (Assistant)
- 2003–2004: Pirin 1922
- 2004–2005: Vihren Sandanski
- 2005–2007: Pirin Gotse Delchev
- 2007: Velbazhd Kyustendil
- 2007: Svilengrad 1921
- 2007–2009: Pirin Gotse Delchev
- 2010: Vihren Sandanski
- 2010: Pirin Blagoevgrad
- 2010–2011: Brestnik
- * Club domestic league appearances and goals

Yordan Bozdanski (Bulgarian: Йордан Боздански; born 7 October 1964) is a Bulgarian former football player and former football manager of Pirin Blagoevgrad.

== Career ==
Born in Sandanski, Yordan Bozdanski played in his career for Pirin Blagoevgrad, Vihren Sandanski, Pirin Gotse Delchev, Septemvri Simitli, Greek Ethnikos Piraeus, Spanish UD Las Palmas and Macedonian FK Maleš. He began managing prior to his retirement as a player.

== Honours ==
=== As a player ===
Pirin Blagoevgrad

- Bulgarian Cup
  - Runner-up (1): 1993-94

=== As a coach ===
Vihren Sandanski

- B PFG
  - Winner (1): 2004-05
