= Yakov Paparkov =

Bulgarian footballer and manager

Personal information
- Date of birth: 8 February 1971 (age 55)
- Place of birth: Bulgaria
- Position: Defender

Senior career*
Years	Team	Apps	(Gls)
1991–1995	Lokomotiv GO	83	(1)
1996–1997	Lokomotiv Ruse	31	(5)
1997–2000	Minyor Pernik	61	(2)
- * Club domestic league appearances and goals

Yakov Paparkov (Bulgarian: Яков Папарков; born 6 February 1971) is a Bulgarian association football manager and former player who has served as the manager of Pirin Gotse Delchev.

He has played for numerous clubs in Bulgaria, including Etar 1924, Makedonska Slava, Minyor Pernik, Marek Dupnitsa, Belasitsa Petrich, Lokomotiv Rousse, Lokomotiv GO, and Pirin Gotse Delchev.

On 27 June 2011, Paparkov was confirmed as the new manager of Pirin Gotse Delchev, replacing Ivan Atanasov. He guided the club to the A PFG in his first season.
