= Andrey Stoev =

Bulgarian footballer

Personal information
- Full name: Andrey Rumenov Stoev
- Date of birth: 2 October 1986 (age 40)
- Place of birth: Blagoevgrad, Bulgaria
- Height: 1.87 m (6 ft 1 1/2 in)
- Position: Defender

Senior career*
Years	Team	Apps	(Gls)
2006–2009	Pirin Blagoevgrad	34	(0)
2009–2010	Bansko	10	(0)
2010	Pirin Blagoevgrad	1	(0)
2011	Sliven 2000	14	(0)
2012–2015	Pirin Blagoevgrad	10	(1)
2015	Gandzasar Kapan	0	(0)
- * Club domestic league appearances and goals as of 21 March 2017

Andrey Stoev (Bulgarian: Андрей Стоев; born 2 October 1986) is a Bulgarian former footballer who played as a defender.
