= Viktor Shishkov =

Bulgarian footballer

Personal information
- Date of birth: 7 September 1986 (age 40)
- Place of birth: Gotse Delchev, Bulgaria
- Height: 1.86 m (6 ft 1 in)
- Position: Forward

Team information
- Current team: Pirin Gotse Delchev

Senior career*
Years	Team	Apps	(Gls)
2009–2013	Pirin Gotse Delchev	64	(10)
2013	Alashkert	11	(2)
2014	Beroe Stara Zagora	5	(2)
2014–2015	Bansko	20	(2)
2015	Pirin Razlog	14	(3)
2016	Episkopi	?	(?)
2016	Lokomotiv GO	1	(0)
2016–2017	Bansko	17	(2)
2017–2020	Pirin Gotse Delchev		
2020–2021	Bansko		
2023–	Pirin Gotse Delchev		

Managerial career
- 2017–2020: Pirin Gotse Delchev (assistant)
- * Club domestic league appearances and goals as of 18:22, 26 December 2023 (UTC)

Viktor Shishkov (Bulgarian: Виктор Шишков; born 7 September 1986) is a Bulgarian footballer who plays as a forward for Pirin Gotse Delchev.

On 21 September 2017, Shishkov was appointed as assistant manager of Pirin Gotse Delchev.
