= Martin Gaziev =

Bulgarian footballer

Personal information
- Full name: Martin Velizarov Gaziev
- Date of birth: 13 August 1988 (age 38)
- Place of birth: Gotse Delchev, Bulgaria
- Height: 1.78 m (5 ft 10 in)
- Position: Midfielder

Team information
- Current team: Maritsa Plovdiv
- Number: 19

Youth career
- Lokomotiv 101
- 2004–2007: Lokomotiv Plovdiv

Senior career*
Years	Team	Apps	(Gls)
2007–2009	Brestnik 1948	95	(15)
2011	Pirin Gotse Delchev	14	(6)
2012	Rabotnički Skopje	4	(0)
2013–2014	Pirin Gotse Delchev	41	(2)
2015–2016	Pirin Razlog	39	(2)
2016	Pirin Gotse Delchev	15	(0)
2017	Pirin Razlog	12	(2)
2018–2019	Sozopol	9	(0)
2019–2021	FC Kyustendil	51	(2)
2021–	Maritsa Plovdiv	60	(3)
- * Club domestic league appearances and goals as of 5 June 2023

Martin Gaziev (Bulgarian: Мартин Газиев; born 13 August 1988 in Gotse Delchev) is a Bulgarian footballer who plays as a midfielder for Maritsa Plovdiv.

== Career ==
Gaziev played youth football at Lokomotiv 101 in Sofia five years before being scouted by Lokomotiv Plovdiv. He joined Lokomotiv Plovdiv as a youth player at the age of 16.

Gaziev started his senior career at Brestnik 1948 and played also for Benkovski Pazardzhik and Lokomotiv Septemvri, before moving to Pirin Gotse Delchev on 20 June 2011.

After playing six months at Pirin, Gaziev signed for First Macedonian League club Rabotnički Skopje on 1 February 2012.

On 11 July 2017, Gaziev returned to Pirin Razlog.

On 7 January 2018, Gaziev signed with Sozopol. He left the club at the end of the 2017–18 season.
