= Georg Vasilev =

Bulgarian footballer (born 1995)

Personal information
- Full name: Georg Ivanov Vasilev
- Date of birth: 29 October 1995 (age 31)
- Place of birth: Bulgaria
- Height: 1.82 m (5 ft 11 1/2 in)
- Position: Midfielder

Youth career
- –2014: Lokomotiv Sofia
- 2014: → Parma (loan)

Senior career*
Years	Team	Apps	(Gls)
2013–2015	Lokomotiv Sofia	2	(0)
2015	→ Marek Dupnitsa (loan)	6	(0)
2015	Slavia Sofia	0	(0)
2016	Lokomotiv Sofia	10	(10)
Total		18	(10)

International career
2013	Bulgaria U19	3	(0)
- * Club domestic league appearances and goals as of 8 May 2016

Georg Ivanov Vasilev (Bulgarian: Георг Иванов Василев; born 29 October 1995) is a former Bulgarian footballer who played as a midfielder.

== Career ==
Georg retired from football at the age of just 21. He become Sports director of Lokomotiv Sofia in 2018. He helped the team to return in First League and stayed on that position until 7 September 2023.

== Club statistics ==
=== Club ===
As of 1 May 2016

Professional Club Performance
Club	Season	A Group		Bulgarian Cup		Europe		Total	
Club	Season	Apps	Goals	Apps	Goals	Apps	Goals	Apps	Goals
Lokomotiv Sofia	2012–13	1	0	0	0	–	–	1	0
Lokomotiv Sofia	2013–14	1	0	1	0	–	–	2	0
Lokomotiv Sofia	2014–15	0	0	1	0	–	–	1	0
Marek Dupnitsa	2014–15	6	0	0	0	–	–	6	0
Slavia Sofia	2015–16	0	0	0	0	–	–	0	0
Lokomotiv 1929 Sofia	2015–16	9	8	0	0	–	–	9	8
Total		17	8	2	0	0	0	19	8
