= Dimitar Andonov (footballer) =

Bulgarian footballer

Personal information
- Full name: Dimitar Veselinov Andonov
- Date of birth: 19 October 1987 (age 39)
- Place of birth: Ivaylovgrad, Bulgaria
- Height: 1.87 m (6 ft 2 in)
- Position: Midfielder

Youth career
- Beroe Stara Zagora

Senior career*
Years	Team	Apps	(Gls)
2005–2006	Beroe Stara Zagora	0	(0)
2006–2007	Sliven 2000	14	(0)
2007	Levski Stara Zagora	9	(0)
2008	Minyor Radnevo	8	(0)
2008–2011	Svilengrad 1921	58	(2)
2011	Chavdar Byala Slatina	12	(0)
2012	Chernomorets Byala	7	(0)
2012–2014	Marek Dupnitsa	68	(11)
2015	Haskovo	11	(0)
2015	Septemvri Sofia	8	(0)
- * Club domestic league appearances and goals as of 1 February 2016

Dimitar Veselinov Andonov (Bulgarian: Димитър Веселинов Андонов; born 19 October 1987) is a Bulgarian footballer who currently plays as a midfielder.
