= Lyubomir Gutsev =

Bulgarian footballer

Personal information
- Full name: Lyubomir Kostadinov Gutsev
- Date of birth: 18 March 1990 (age 36)
- Place of birth: Gotse Delchev, Bulgaria
- Height: 1.82 m (6 ft 0 in)
- Position: Centre-back

Team information
- Current team: Pirin Gotse Delchev
- Number: 5

Youth career
- Pirin Gotse Delchev

Senior career*
Years	Team	Apps	(Gls)
2009–2014	Pirin Gotse Delchev	134	(5)
2014	Chernomorets Burgas	14	(0)
2015–2016	Septemvri Simitli	30	(0)
2016	Tsarsko Selo	11	(1)
2017–2018	Oborishte	47	(1)
2019	Pirin Blagoevgrad	5	(0)
2020	Flamurtari Prishtinë	4	(1)
2020–	Pirin Gotse Delchev		
- * Club domestic league appearances and goals as of 21:04, 8 November 2022 (UTC)

Lyubomir Kostadinov Gutsev (Bulgarian: Любомир Костадинов Гуцев; born 18 March 1990) is a Bulgarian footballer who plays as a centre-back for Pirin Gotse Delchev.

== Club career ==
On 17 January 2020, Gutsev joined Kosovan club KF Flamurtari Prishtinë on a deal for six months with an extension option.
