= Tomislav Pavlov =

Bulgarian footballer

Personal information
- Full name: Tomislav Slavchev Pavlov
- Date of birth: 28 June 1991 (age 35)
- Place of birth: Pernik, Bulgaria
- Height: 1.78 m (5 ft 10 in)
- Position: Attacking midfielder

Team information
- Current team: Sportist Svoge
- Number: 10

Youth career
- –2007: CSKA Sofia
- 2007–2009: Celtic

Senior career*
Years	Team	Apps	(Gls)
2009	CSKA Sofia	0	(0)
2010–2014	Minyor Pernik	83	(32)
2014–2015	Pirin Blagoevgrad	5	(0)
2015	→ Marek Dupnitsa (loan)	1	(0)
2015–2017	Minyor Pernik	58	(29)
2017–2019	CSKA 1948	45	(9)
2019–2020	Minyor Pernik	48	(23)
2020–2021	Lokomotiv Sofia	10	(1)
2021–	Sportist Svoge	8	(2)

International career
2007–2008	Bulgaria U17		
- * Club domestic league appearances and goals as of 20 December 2021

Tomislav Slavchev Pavlov (Bulgarian: Томислав Славчев Павлов; born 10 June 1991) is a Bulgarian footballer who plays as a midfielder for Sportist Svoge.

== Career ==
=== Early career ===
Pavlov began his career at CSKA Sofia. At the age of 15 he was scouted by Scottish side Celtic whom he signed for in March 2007 . After spending two years of his career in the Celtic youth team, on 2 August 2009, he returned to his old club, despite an offer from the Glasgow side. Pavlov played six months for the reserve squad of CSKA, before moving to Minyor Pernik in January 2010.

=== Minyor Pernik ===
In January 2010 Pavlov was invited by Minyor Pernik . He made his team debut a few days later in a 1–0 friendly win against Pirin Gotse Delchev. After the match Pavlov signed a 2 1/2-year contract with the club.

=== CSKA 1948 ===
On 11 August 2017, Pavlov signed with CSKA 1948.

== Career statistics ==
=== Club ===
As of 17 November 2020

Club	Season	Division	League		Cup		Europe		Total	
Club	Season	Division	Apps	Goals	Apps	Goals	Apps	Goals	Apps	Goals
Minyor Pernik	2009–10	A Group	1	0	0	0	–		1	0
Minyor Pernik	2010–11	A Group	7	3	0	0	–		7	3
Minyor Pernik	2011–12	A Group	13	1	1	0	–		14	1
Minyor Pernik	2012–13	A Group	23	4	6	1	–		29	5
Minyor Pernik	2013–14	V Group	26	17	6	6	–		32	23
Minyor Pernik	Total		70	25	13	7	0	0	83	32
Pirin Blagoevgrad	2014–15	B Group	5	0	0	0	–		5	0
Pirin Blagoevgrad	Total		5	0	0	0	0	0	5	0
Marek Dupnitsa	2014–15	A Group	1	0	0	0	–		1	0
Marek Dupnitsa	Total		1	0	0	0	0	0	1	0
Minyor Pernik	2015–16	Third League	27	12	?	?	–		27	12
Minyor Pernik	2016–17	Third League	31	17	?	?	–		31	17
Minyor Pernik	Total		58	29	0	0	0	0	58	29
CSKA 1948	2017–18	Third League	28	5	4	3	–		32	8
CSKA 1948	2018–19	Second League	12	1	1	0	–		13	1
CSKA 1948	Total		40	6	5	3	0	0	45	9
Minyor Pernik	2018–19	Third League	17	9	0	0	–		17	9
Minyor Pernik	2019–20	Third League	18	7	4	5	–		22	12
Minyor Pernik	2020–21	Second League	8	2	1	0	–		9	2
Minyor Pernik	Total		43	18	5	5	0	0	48	23
Career Total			217	78	23	15	0	0	240	93
