= Emil Rachev =

Bulgarian footballer (1990–2018)

Personal information
- Date of birth: 9 April 1990
- Place of birth: Stara Zagora, Bulgaria
- Date of death: 27 August 2018 (aged 28)
- Place of death: Enina, Bulgaria
- Position: Midfielder

Youth career
- Rozova Dolina Kazanlak
- Beroe Stara Zagora

Senior career*
Years	Team	Apps	(Gls)
2009–2010	Beroe Stara Zagora	1	(0)
2010–2011	Neftochimic 1986		(5)
2011–2012	Chernomorets Pomorie	1	(0)
2012–2014	PFC Burgas		(9)
2014	Académica Lobito		
2015	PFC Burgas	7	(2)
2015–2016	Neftochimic Burgas	8	(0)
2016–2017	Rozova Dolina Kazanlak	45	(35)
2017	Neftochimic Burgas	0	(0)
2017–2018	Rozova Dolina Kazanlak		
- * Club domestic league appearances and goals as of 22:26, 31 May 2017 (UTC)

Emil Rachev (Bulgarian: Емил Рачев; 9 April 1990 – 27 August 2018) was a Bulgarian footballer who played as a midfielder.

== Career ==
On 23 November 2009 Rachev made his professional debut for Beroe Stara Zagora in A Group in match against Minyor Pernik.

On 30 June 2017, after a season and half in Rozova Dolina Kazanlak and scoring 35 goals in 45 matches, he rejoined in Neftochimic Burgas in Bulgarian Second Professional League. Rachev suffered an injury during pre-season and was released in September without making a single appearance for the team.

Rachev died in his sleep on 27 August 2018 from a heart attack, just a few hours after a league match with Rozova Dolina Kazanlak in Third League.
