= Pedro Mendes (footballer, born April 1990) =

Portuguese footballer

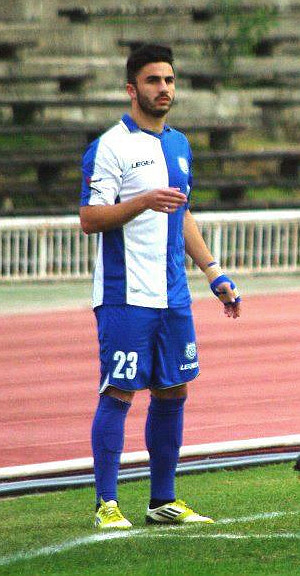
- Mendes playing for Chernomorets

Personal information
- Full name: Pedro Miguel Alves Mendes
- Date of birth: 16 April 1990 (age 36)
- Place of birth: Guimarães, Portugal
- Height: 1.75 m (5 ft 9 in)
- Position: Winger

Team information
- Current team: Porto D'Ave

Youth career
- 2002–2003: Vitória Guimarães
- 2003–2004: Candoso de São Tiago
- 2004–2007: Fair-Play
- 2007–2008: Vitória Guimarães
- 2008–2009: Gondomar

Senior career*
Years	Team	Apps	(Gls)
2009–2011	Gondomar	26	(3)
2011–2012	Doxa	22	(4)
2012–2013	Chernomorets	0	(0)
2013–2014	Lixa	10	(3)
2014–2015	Varzim	11	(0)
2015	Tondela	1	(0)
2015–2016	Felgueiras 1932	10	(2)
2016–2017	Torcatense	12	(0)
2018–2019	Berço	24	(0)
2019–2020	Operário Antime	9	(2)
2020	AD Oliveirense	2	(0)
2020–	Porto D'Ave	3	(0)
- * Club domestic league appearances and goals as of 5 September 2021

Pedro Miguel Alves Mendes (born 16 April 1990) is a Portuguese professional footballer who plays for Porto D'Ave as a left winger.

== Club career ==
Born in Guimarães, Mendes played youth football for four different clubs, including two spells with local Vitória Sport Clube. He made his senior debut in 2009 with Gondomar S.C. in the third level and, after two seasons, signed with Cypriot Second Division team Doxa Katokopias FC.

In the summer of 2012, Mendes joined PSFC Chernomorets Burgas. His input for the Bulgarians consisted of 22 minutes in a 1–3 away loss against PFC Lokomotiv Sofia for the Bulgarian Cup, and he was released at the end of the campaign.

In the following years, Mendes competed in the Portuguese third tier, with F.C. Lixa and Varzim SC.
