= Galin Dimov =

Bulgarian footballer

Personal information
- Full name: Galin Diyanov Dimov
- Date of birth: 29 October 1990 (age 36)
- Place of birth: Bulgaria
- Height: 1.78 m (5 ft 10 in)
- Position: Midfielder

Team information
- Current team: Sozopol
- Number: 11

Senior career*
Years	Team	Apps	(Gls)
2009–2011	Chernomorets Pomorie	40	(6)
2012–2014	Neftochimic 1986	58	(4)
2014	Haskovo	4	(0)
2015	Chernomorets Burgas	13	(1)
2015	Dobrudzha	15	(0)
2016–2019	Nesebar	88	(3)
2019–2020	Neftochimic	16	(2)
2021–	Sozopol	64	(4)
- * Club domestic league appearances and goals as of 5 June 2023

Galin Dimov (Bulgarian: Галин Димов; born 29 October 1990) is a Bulgarian footballer who plays as a midfielder for Sozopol. His twin brother Plamen is also footballer. They are sons of Diyan Petkov.
