= Stanimir Andonov =

Bulgarian football player

Personal information
- Full name: Stanimir Ivelinov Andonov
- Date of birth: 30 September 1989 (age 37)
- Place of birth: Bulgaria
- Height: 1.75 m (5 ft 9 in)
- Position: Midfielder

Team information
- Current team: Заря Крушари

Youth career
- Vidima-Rakovski

Senior career*
Years	Team	Apps	(Gls)
2008–2011	Vidima-Rakovski	55	(5)
2012	Dobrudzha Dobrich	9	(3)
2012	Neftochimic Burgas	4	(1)
2013–2014	Dobrudzha Dobrich	36	(1)
2015	PFC Burgas	10	(0)
2015–2016	Neftochimic Burgas	24	(0)
2016–2019	Dobrudzha Dobrich	15	(1)
2019–	Ustrem Donchevo	?	(1)
- * Club domestic league appearances and goals as of 29 March 2022

Stanimir Andonov (Bulgarian: Станимир Андонов; born 30 September 1989) is a Bulgarian football player who currently plays as a midfielder for Zaria Krushari.
