= Lokomotiv Stadium (Mezdra) =

Football stadium in Mezdra, Bulgaria

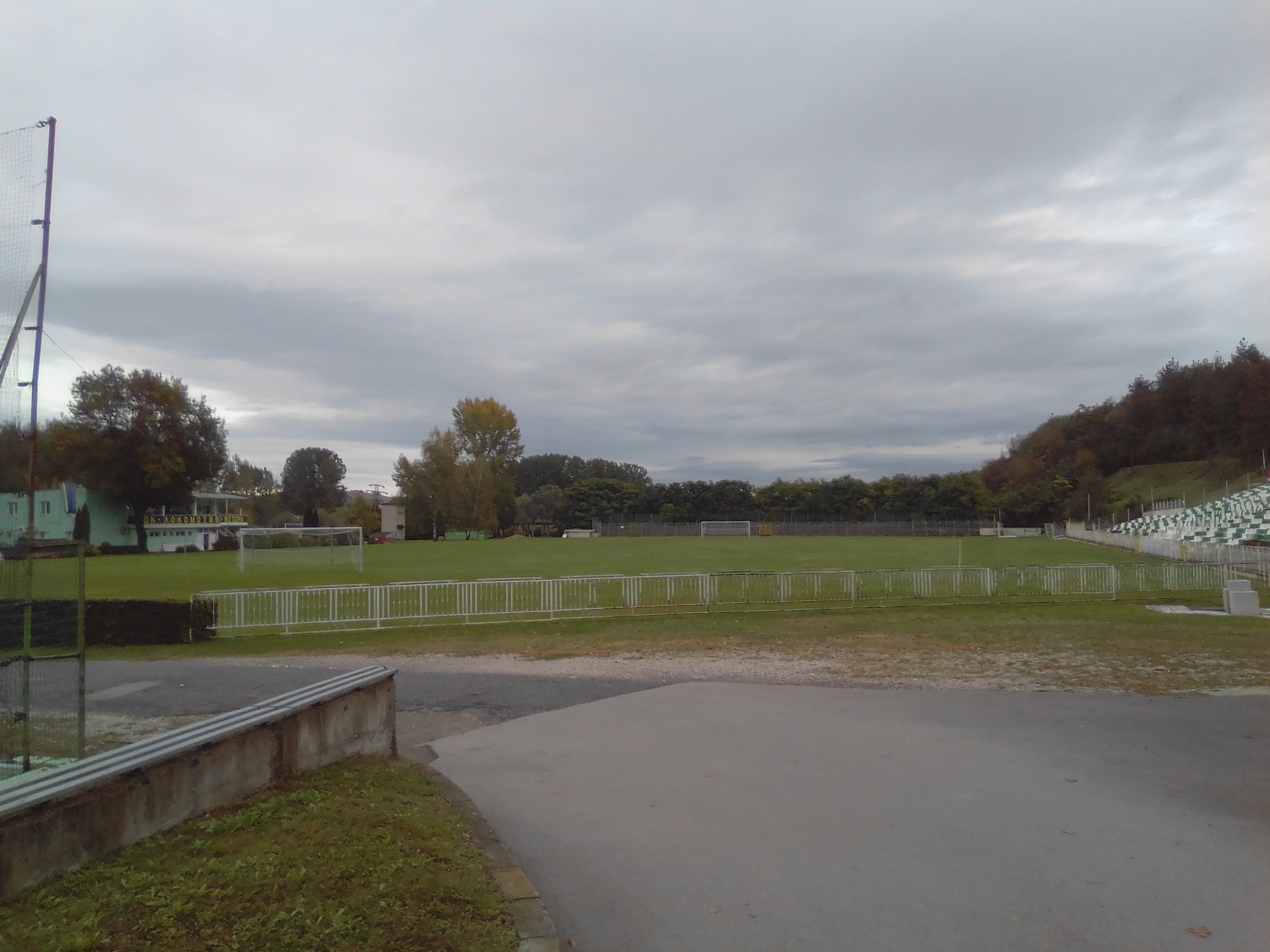
- Lokomotiv Stadium, Mezdra
- Interactive map of Lokomotiv Stadium
- Full name: Lokomotiv Mezdra Stadium
- Location: Mezdra, Bulgaria
- Coordinates: 43°8′20″N 23°42′45″E
- Owner: NADIN AD
- Operator: PFC Lokomotiv Mezdra
- Capacity: 3,000
- Surface: Grass
- Field size: 100 X 65

Construction
- Built: 1946
- Opened: 1946
- Renovated: 2007

Tenant
- Lokomotiv Mezdra (1946–present)

Lokomotiv Stadium (Bulgarian: Стадион „Локомотив“) is a multi-purpose stadium in Mezdra, Bulgaria. It is currently used for football matches and it is the home of PFC Lokomotiv Mezdra. The stadium has a capacity of 5,000 spectators and it was built in 1946.

- In 2007, when the football club was bought by NADIN AD, several renovations were made to the stadium, to meet the BFL's requirements, since Lokomotiv promoted to the A Group for the first time in the club's history.
- There were also plans for a new stadium in place of the current, but due to the Great Recession, the project was put on hold.
