= Mario Bliznakov =

Bulgarian footballer

Personal information
- Full name: Mario Georgiev Bliznakov
- Date of birth: 9 August 1982 (age 44)
- Place of birth: Bulgaria
- Height: 1.73 m (5 ft 8 in)
- Position: Midfielder

Senior career*
Years	Team	Apps	(Gls)
2005–2011	Pirin Gotse Delchev	88	(14)
2008	→ Vidima-Rakovski (loan)	5	(0)
2009	→ Bansko (loan)	13	(2)
2011–2012	Bdin VIdin	4	(4)
2012	Lyubimets 2007	17	(6)
2013–2014	Pirin Gotse Delchev	47	(7)
2014	Marek Dupnitsa	14	(3)
2015	Bansko	13	(4)
2015	Pirin Gotse Delchev	7	(2)
2016–	Eordaikos	15	(5)
- * Club domestic league appearances and goals as of 1 January 2016

Mario Bliznakov (Bulgarian: Марио Близнаков; born 9 August 1982) is a Bulgarian football midfielder. (Note: Mario Bliznakov at WorldFootball.net)
