= Iliyan Chavdarov =

Bulgarian footballer

Personal information
- Full name: Iliyan Chavdarov Chavdarov
- Date of birth: 4 May 1991 (age 35)
- Place of birth: Bulgaria
- Height: 1.84 m (6 ft 0 in)
- Position: Forward

Team information
- Current team: Marek 1919

Senior career*
Years	Team	Apps	(Gls)
2009–2011	Velbazhd Kyustendil	43	(10)
2011–2012	Kaliakra Kavarna	17	(1)
2012–2014	Velbazhd Kyustendil	51	(13)
2014	Germanea	12	(2)
2015	Pirin Razlog	8	(0)
2015	Dobrudzha Dobrich	6	(0)
2016–2017	Marek		
2017–	Bansko		
- * Club domestic league appearances and goals as of 31 December 2018

Iliyan Chavdarov (Bulgarian: Илиян Чавдаров; born 4 May 1991) is a former Bulgarian footballer.

== Career ==
In 2009, Chavdarov was included in the Velbazhd Kyustendil first-team squad. During his two years at Velbazhd, he scored 10 goals in the South-West V AFG.

On 20 July 2011, Chavdarov joined Kaliakra Kavarna in co-ownership deal. Kaliakra acquired 75% of Chavdarov's transfer rights. He made his debut in a 1–0 league loss against Chernomorets Burgas on 6 August, coming on as a substitute for Georgi Kichukov.

Chavdarov spent the 2016–17 season at Marek Dupnitsa but left the club at the end of the campaign. In August 2017, he joined Bansko.

== Career statistics ==
As of 5 February 2012

Club	Season	League		Cup		Europe		Total	
Club	Season	Apps	Goals	Apps	Goals	Apps	Goals	Apps	Goals
Velbazhd Kyustendil	2009–10	?	3	—		—		?	3
Velbazhd Kyustendil	2010–11	?	7	—		—		?	7
Kaliakra Kavarna	2011–12	7	0	2	0	—		9	0
