= Abdi Abdikov =

Bulgarian football goalkeeper

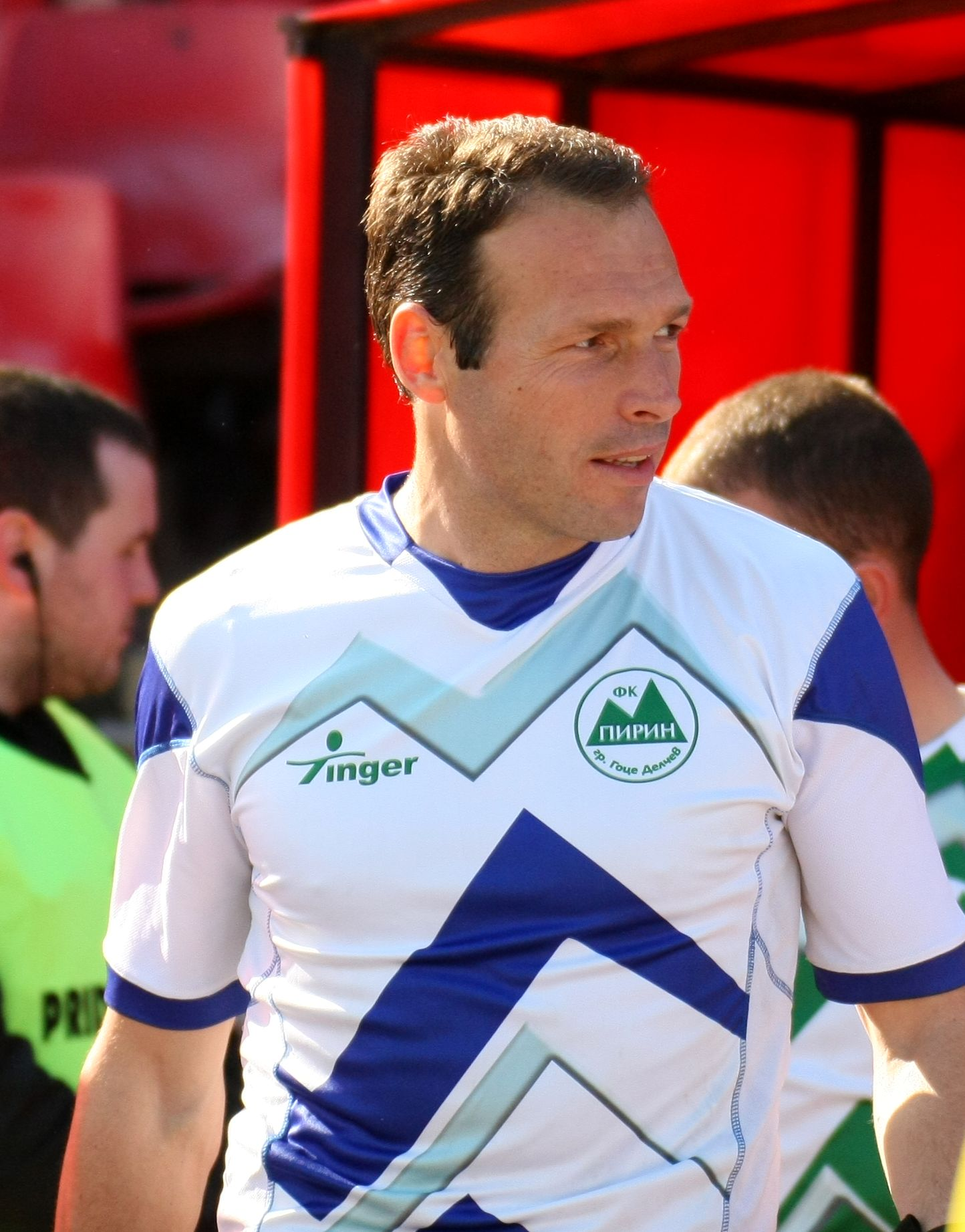

Personal information
- Full name: Abdi Abdi Abdikov
- Date of birth: 9 March 1983 (age 43)
- Place of birth: Gotse Delchev, Bulgaria
- Height: 1.91 m (6 ft 3 in)
- Position: Goalkeeper

Senior career*
Years	Team	Apps	(Gls)
2003–2007	Pirin Gotse Delchev	120	(0)
2007–2008	Vidima-Rakovski	11	(0)
2008–2009	Pirin Gotse Delchev	27	(0)
2009–2010	PAEEK	26	(0)
2010–2011	Othellos Athienou	16	(0)
2011–2014	Pirin Gotse Delchev	79	(0)
2014–2015	Karmiotissa Polemidion	11	(0)
2015	Septemvri Simitli	8	(0)
2016	Levski Karlovo	16	(0)
2016–2017	Bansko	17	(0)
2017–2018	Pirin Razlog	36	(0)
2019–2020	Bansko	27	(0)
2020–2022	Pirin Gotse Delchev	28	(0)
2022–2023	Vihren Sandanski	8	(0)
2023–2025	Bansko	45	(0)
- * Club domestic league appearances and goals

Abdi Abdikov (Bulgarian: Абди Абдиков; born 9 March 1983) is a former Bulgarian professional footballer who played as a goalkeeper.
