= FC Lokomotiv Mezdra =

Bulgarian association football club

Lokomotiv Mezdra
- Full name: FC Lokomotiv Mezdra
- Nickname: The irons from Mezdra
- Founded: 1945; 81 years ago 2016; 10 years ago /refounded/
- Ground: Lokomotiv Stadium, Mezdra
- Capacity: 5 000
- Manager: Valeri Tsvetanov
- League: Third League
- 2025–26: North-West Third League, 1st (promoted)
Home colours	Away colours

FC Lokomotiv Mezdra (ФК Локомотив Мездра) is a Bulgarian football club from the town of Mezdra, which competes in the Third League, the third tier of Bulgarian football. The club's home ground is the Lokomotiv Stadium in Mezdra, with a capacity of 5,000. Team colours are red and black. The club's nickname is "The Irons from Mezdra", due to the city of Mezdra's connections with the railroad industry.

The club was originally founded in 1945. Lokomotiv saw little success for the majority of its history, usually competing in the second or third tiers of Bulgarian football. In 2008, the team achieved a historic first promotion to the A Group. Lokomotiv Mezdra managed to play two seasons in the elite, before suffering relegation after the 2009-10 season. In the following years, financial problems overwhelmed the club, forcing its folding in 2012. Two successor clubs were created, Lokomotiv 1929 Mezdra, and OFC Lokomotiv Mezdra. The original club was merged with Lokomotiv 1929 Mezdra. This new club folded in 2018. Another successor, named OFC Lokomotiv Mezdra, was created in 2016, starting from the regional amateur fourth tier.

== History ==
=== 1945–2007 ===
PFC Lokomotiv Mezdra was founded in 1945, under the name Iron sport club. The team, nicknamed The irons from Mezdra, counts 20 participations in the second division, and the best success in Bulgarian Cup is a quarter-final in 1945–46.

=== 2007–2012: NADIN ownership and promotion to the elite ===
The turning point in the history of the club was in 2007. The company NADIN bought the club, and almost all of its players were released and a significant number of valuable players were signed. The team won the second division without difficulty, finishing more than 10 points ahead of the second team in the table and qualifying for the top flight for the first time in its history.

In the first year in the top division, Lokomotiv's owner decided to bring players with a lot of experience in the Bulgarian football, his first signing being ex-Levski Sofia's Saša Simonović, who arrived from Slavia Sofia for free. Radostin Stanev, Iliya Iliev and Strati Iliev were just a few players who soon followed, as the club also signed seven imports – Portuguese David Silva, Rui Miguel and Fausto, Serbian Zoran Cvetković, Austrian Milan Janković, Greek Aristeidis Lottas and Jiří Lenko from Czech Republic. The team coach was Viktorio Pavlov. The first top flight game was against Spartak Varna, a 0–2 loss. After the match, Pavlov decided to resign and Georgi Todorov was named in his place. In their first season in A Group, Lokomotiv eventually finished in 8th place, a success for a newcomer in the league.

Their second season in the elite was less successful, and was marked by inconsistency on and off the pitch. Lokomotiv Mezdra eventually finished 14th, suffering relegation after two years of top flight football.

The club was dissolved in early August 2012 after suffering from big financial debts. Two new clubs was founded in Mezdra – Lokomotiv 1929 in 2011 and Lokomotiv 2012 in 2012. Neither was really seen as a true and legitimate successor, and both eventually folded shortly after their founding.

=== 2016–present: Refounding ===
The club was refounded in 2016, under the name FC Lokomotiv Mezdra, after the finantional failing of both Lokomotov 2012 and Lokomotiv 1929. In 2018, the new team managed to win the regional league of Vratsa and promoted to the Third League.

== Honours ==
=== Domestic ===
Bulgarian A PFG

- 8th place 2008–09

Bulgarian Cup

- Twice 1/8 finalist 1946 and 2009–10

=== European ===
- European Railways Cup Winners (1): 2003

== Players ==
=== Current squad ===
As of 1 August 2026

Note: Flags indicate national team as defined under FIFA eligibility rules; some limited exceptions apply. Players may hold more than one non-FIFA nationality.

No.	Pos.	Nation	Player
1	GK	BUL	Ivaylo Saykov
3	DF	BUL	Emil Mandev
4	DF	BUL	Vasil Sapundzhiev
6	MF	BUL	Mihail Beshev
7	FW	BUL	Valdemar Lashkov
9	MF	BUL	Kristiyan Nikolaev
10	FW	BUL	Asen Rusinov
11	MF	BUL	Stilyan Spasov
12	GK	BUL	Kiril Daskalov
17	MF	BUL	Tsvetomir Karaivanov
18	DF	BUL	Ivaylo Boyadzhiev

No.	Pos.	Nation	Player
20	MF	BUL	Nikolay Nikolov
22	MF	BUL	Teodor Simeonov
23	GK	BUL	Hristo Georgiev
31	DF	BUL	Ivaylo Todorov
32	FW	BUL	Vasil Kaloyanov
45	DF	BUL	Borislav Tsvetkov
77	MF	BUL	Aleks Todorov
80	MF	BUL	Braian Dochev
88	MF	BUL	Viktor Pavlov
94	DF	BUL	Vanyo Ivanov
99	FW	BUL	Sergey Georgiev

== Past seasons ==
Season	League	Place	W	D	L	GF	GA	Pts	Bulgarian Cup
2016–17	A RFG (IV)	–	–	–	–	–	–	–	not qualified
Green marks a season followed by promotion, red a season followed by relegation.

== Most games with the club ==
- 1. 267 – (Bulgaria) Atanas Atanasov
- 2. 246 – (Bulgaria) Milcho Gergov
- 3. 210 – (Bulgaria) Bonko Raykov

== Most goals with the club ==
- 1. 83 – (Bulgaria) Georgi Yashov
- 2. 66 – (Bulgaria) Atanas Atanasov
- 3. 42 – (Bulgaria) Vladimir Hinkov

== Notable players ==
- (Bulgaria) Tsvetan Genkov (born 8 August 1984 in Mezdra, Genkov began his career in Lokomotiv at the age of seventeen, previously having been an athlete. For Lokomotiv he played 84 matches and scored 41 goals)
