= FC Pirin Gotse Delchev =

Bulgarian association football club

Pirin Gotse Delchev
- Full name: Football Club Pirin Gotse Delchev
- Nickname: Nevrokopchani
- Founded: 1925; 101 years ago
- Ground: Gradski, Gotse Delchev
- Capacity: 5,000
- Manager: Dimitar Krushovski
- League: A RFG Blagoevgrad
- 2025-26: Southwest Third League, 16th (relegated)
- Website: fc-piringd.com
Home colours	Away colours

Football Club Pirin (Bulgarian: Футболен клуб Пирин) is a Bulgarian football club, based in Gotse Delchev. The club currently plays in the A RFG Blagoevgrad, the regional fourth tier of Bulgarian football league system.

The club's biggest success came in 2012, when Pirin managed to promote to the A Group for the first time. Their spell in the top flight lasted two seasons, culminating in relegation at the end of the 2013–14 season. Pirin play home games at the Gradski stadium, with a capacity of 5,000. They play in green and white stripped kits. The club emblem represents the Pirin mountain range in Southwestern Bulgaria.

== History ==
Pirin Gotse Delchev were founded in 1925 as Pirin Nevrokop (Nevrokop being the former name of Gotse Delchev), and their traditional colours are green and white. In 1981–82 Pirin were promoted for the first time to B PFG. The club spent three years in second division, before being relegated in 1985 to third division.

After 8 years in the lowers divisions of Bulgarian football, in 1993 Pirin returned to B PFG. In their first season back in second division Pirin finished in eight place in the league. In the following 1994–95 season was a poor one for the club, ending with the team in second lowest place and relegated back to the third division.

In 2005 the club won a third promotion to the B PFG in its history. In December 2005, Yordan Bozdanski was appointed as manager. Pirin finished the 2006–07 season in third place in the West B PFG, their highest finish in the league since their еstablishment.

On 27 June 2011, Yakov Paparkov was officially announced as the club's new manager. In the 2011–12 season, Pirin won the West B PFG with a 62 points, scoring 41 goals and losing only three times. Pirin were promoted to Bulgarian football's top division for the first time in their history.

Their first season in the top level of Bulgarian football was successful. The team won ten games and draw four, earning them 34 points. These results placed them in 11th position, three points above the relegation zone. At home, Pirin won six games, as well as drew three, including a 1–1 draw against Levski Sofia, the eventual runners-up of the 2012–13 season. Away results were also good, considering that this was the debut season for Pirin in the elite. They won four games and draw once. The manager for the season was Tencho Tenev, who was appointed at the beginning of the season.

For the upcoming season, the format of the Bulgarian league was changed, with the bottom seven teams qualifying for the relegation group. Pirin did not manage to repeat the same results from last season, as the team spent the majority of the season in the relegation group. They started the season with a draw against Lokomotiv Sofia. This was followed by eight defeats in a row, which placed them at the bottom of the table. They eventually finished 13th in the regular season, thus being placed in the relegation zone. The team did not improve its results there, losing four out of their six home games, as well as losing five out of six away games. At the end of the season, Pirin were 32 points below the relegation line, thus being relegated. This ended Pirin's two-year stay in the A Group.

Although they were supposed to play in the B Group next season (2014–15), Pirin did not obtain a license due to financial constraints and was demoted to the third tier.

At the end of the 2017–18 season, Pirin was relegated to the fourth amateur league.

After two seasons in the fourth tier, Pirin returned to the Third League in 2020. On 6 June, Pirin signed an agreement with OFC Pirin Blagoevgrad, at the time playing in the second tier. The agreement allowed young Pirin Blagoevgrad players to be loaned out to Pirin Gotse Delchev, thus making Pirin Gotse Delchev a satellite team of the other Pirin.

== Honours ==
=== League ===
West B PFG

- Champions: 2011–12

== Current squad ==
As of 1 January 2026

Note: Flags indicate national team as defined under FIFA eligibility rules; some limited exceptions apply. Players may hold more than one non-FIFA nationality.

No.	Pos.	Nation	Player
4	DF	BUL	Ivan Makriev
5	MF	BUL	Roberto Belyanov
7	MF	GRE	Christos Markosyan
8	MF	BUL	Aleks Damyanov
9	FW	BUL	Viktor Shishkov
10	MF	BUL	Martin Gaziev
11	FW	BUL	Pavel Golovodov
13	MF	BUL	Atanas Dimitrov
14	MF	BUL	Ibrahim Sherif

No.	Pos.	Nation	Player
15	MF	BUL	Todor Durev
16	FW	BUL	Hasan Strandzhev
17	MF	BUL	Daniel Golovodov
19	DF	ARM	Arman Markosyan
20	DF	BUL	Ibrahim Pachedzhiev
21	DF	BUL	Zhivko Grozdanov
22	GK	BUL	Kyazim Kupenov
26	MF	BUL	Nikolay Shindov
98	MF	BUL	Georgi Tartov
99	GK	BUL	Redzhep Molamustafa

== Notable players ==
Had international caps for their respective countries, held any club record, or had more than 100 league appearances. Players whose name is listed in bold represented their countries.

Bulgaria

- (Bulgaria) Abdi Abdikov
- (Bulgaria) **Dimcho Belyakov**
- (Bulgaria) Mario Bliznakov
- (Bulgaria) **Yordan Bozdanski**
- (Bulgaria) Lyubomir Gutsev
- (Bulgaria) **Kamen Hadzhiev**
- (Bulgaria) Dimitar Krushovski
- (Bulgaria) Rumen Lapantov
- (Bulgaria) Petar Lazarov
- (Bulgaria) **Georgi Markov**
- (Bulgaria) **Vasil Panayotov**
- (Bulgaria) **Yasen Petrov**
- (Bulgaria) **Dimitar Pirgov**
- (Bulgaria) Viktor Shishkov
- (Bulgaria) **Georgi Vasilev**
- (Bulgaria) Angel Yusev

== Managers ==
Managers in the 21st century
Year	Trainers
2004–05	(Bulgaria) Ventsislav Davidkov
2005	(Bulgaria) Valentin Lazarov
2005–07	(Bulgaria) Yordan Bozdanski
2007	(Bulgaria) Petar Zehtinski
2008–10	(Bulgaria) Yordan Bozdanski
2010	(Bulgaria) Krasimir Traykov
2010–11	(Bulgaria) Dimitar Sokolov
2011	(Bulgaria) Ivan Atanasov
2011–12	(Bulgaria) Yakov Paparkov
1 August 2012–27 August 2013	(Bulgaria) Tencho Tenev
27 August 2013–1 January 2014	(Bulgaria) Kostadin Angelov
16 January 2014–11 September 2017	(Bulgaria) Yordan Bozdanski
11 September 2017–	(Bulgaria) Rumil Zhotev
