= 2012–13 PFC Botev Plovdiv season =

Botev Plovdiv
2012–13 season
- Chairman: Yuli Popov
- Manager: Ferario Spasov (until 10 December 2012); Stanimir Stoilov (from 11 December 2012)
Home colours	Away colours

The 2012–13 season is Botev Plovdiv's 1st season in A Group after their return to the top division of the Bulgarian football league system. This article shows player statistics and all matches (official and friendly) that the club will play during the 2012–13 season.

== Players ==
=== Squad stats ===
Appearances for competitive matches only

No.	Pos	Nat	Player	Total		A Group		Bulgarian Cup	
No.	Pos	Nat	Player	Apps	Goals	Apps	Goals	Apps	Goals
1	GK	(Poland) POL	Adam Stachowiak	14	0	14	0	0	0
2	DF	(Bulgaria) BUL	Vladimir Aytov	1	0	0	0	1	0
3	DF	(Bulgaria) BUL	Asen Karaslavov	12	1	9+1	0	2	1
4	DF	(Bulgaria) BUL	Petar Chobanov	1	0	0	0	0+1	0
5	DF	(North Macedonia) MKD	Boban Grnčarov	28	2	26	2	2	0
6	MF	(Bulgaria) BUL	Kostadin Dyakov	22	2	3+15	0	3+1	2
7	MF	(Bulgaria) BUL	Marian Ognyanov	32	6	22+6	6	2+2	0
8	MF	(Bulgaria) BUL	Todor Nedelev	30	9	23+6	9	1	0
9	FW	(Netherlands) NED	Luís Pedro	11	3	8+3	3	0	0
10	FW	(Brazil) BRA	Vander	24	6	19+4	6	1	0
11	MF	(Bulgaria) BUL	Yordan Hristov	28	0	23+3	0	2	0
12	GK	(Bulgaria) BUL	Apostol Stoyanov	0	0	0	0	0	0
13	MF	(Bulgaria) BUL	Nikolay Pavlov	8	0	0+8	0	0	0
14	DF	(Bulgaria) BUL	Veselin Minev	8	0	7+1	0	0	0
15	DF	(Netherlands) NED	Marlon Pereira Freire	9	0	9	0	0	0
16	MF	(Czech Republic) CZE	Tomáš Jirsák	26	0	24+1	0	1	0
18	FW	(Bulgaria) BUL	Stanislav Kostov	25	6	9+13	3	2+1	3
19	FW	(Bulgaria) BUL	Ivan Tsvetkov	31	17	29	17	2	0
20	MF	(Bulgaria) BUL	Serkan Yusein	2	0	0+2	0	0	0
22	MF	(Bulgaria) BUL	Petar Karadzhov	2	0	0	0	2	0
26	DF	(Brazil) BRA	Arthur Henrique	27	2	22+2	1	3	1
28	MF	(Bulgaria) BUL	Ventsislav Gyuzelev	1	0	0	0	1	0
30	GK	(Bulgaria) BUL	Rosen Andonov	0	0	0	0	0	0
55	DF	(Bulgaria) BUL	Angel Rahov	13	1	9+1	0	3	1
71	MF	(Bulgaria) BUL	Boris Galchev	13	1	13	1	0	0
83	DF	(Netherlands) NED	Civard Sprockel	12	0	12	0	0	0
Players sold or loaned out after the start of the season:
1	GK	(Bulgaria) BUL	Hristo Ivanov	8	0	4	0	4	0
10	MF	(Spain) ESP	Rubén Palazuelos	15	0	14	0	0+1	0
17	DF	(Bulgaria) BUL	Ivaylo Dimitrov	3	0	0	0	2+1	0
20	MF	(Bulgaria) BUL	Lachezar Angelov	1	0	0	0	0+1	0
21	DF	(Bulgaria) BUL	Radoslav Terziev	1	0	0	0	1	0
22	MF	(Brazil) BRA	Diego Ferares	0	0	0	0	0	0
23	GK	(Lithuania) LTU	Ernestas Šetkus	12	0	11	0	0+1	0
28	DF	(Bulgaria) BUL	Lazar Marin	1	0	0	0	1	0
89	DF	(Bulgaria) BUL	Stefan Stanchev	11	0	7+1	0	3	0
90	FW	(Bulgaria) BUL	Petar Atanasov	16	0	2+11	0	2+1	0
92	FW	(Burkina Faso) BFA	Habib Bamogo	8	0	1+4	0	3	0

As of 25 May 2013

== Players in/out ==
=== Summer transfers ===
In:

No.	Pos.	Nation	Player
3	DF	BUL	Asen Karaslavov (from Greuther Fürth)
4	DF	BUL	Petar Chobanov (from Spartak Plovdiv)
5	DF	MKD	Boban Grnčarov (from Lierse)
6	MF	BUL	Kostadin Dyakov (from Chernomorets Burgas)
9	FW	BRA	Vander (from Democrata)
10	MF	ESP	Rubén Palazuelos (from Deportivo Alavés)
16	MF	CZE	Tomáš Jirsák (from Wisła Kraków)
18	FW	BUL	Stanislav Kostov (on loan from CSKA Sofia, later bought from the club)
19	FW	BUL	Ivan Tsvetkov (from Levski Sofia)
22	MF	BRA	Diego Ferares (from Chavdar Etropole)
23	GK	LTU	Ernestas Šetkus (from Olympiakos Nicosia)
26	DF	BRA	Arthur Henrique (from Santo André)
89	DF	BUL	Stefan Stanchev (from Levski Sofia)
92	FW	BFA	Habib Bamogo (from Doncaster Rovers)

Out:

No.	Pos.	Nation	Player
1	GK	ARM	Armen Ambartsumyan (retired)
2	DF	BUL	Vasil Vasilev (retired)
3	MF	BUL	Dimitar Bayrev (released)
4	DF	BUL	Radoslav Bachev (released)
5	DF	BUL	Nikolay Domakinov (on loan at Rakovski 2011)
6	DF	BUL	Daniel Bozhkov (released)
10	MF	BUL	Aleksandar Aleksandrov (retired)
18	FW	BUL	Deyan Hristov (to Montana)
19	MF	BUL	Hristo Telkiyski (released)
20	MF	BUL	Nikolay Manchev (released)
21	DF	BUL	Ventsislav Bonev (released)
22	MF	BUL	Valentin Veselinov (released)
25	DF	BUL	Martin Dimov (to Montana)
27	DF	BUL	Nikolay Dimitrov (released)
30	MF	BUL	Dimo Atanasov (released)
33	DF	BUL	Emil Argirov (released)
39	FW	BUL	Atanas Kurdov (released)

=== Winter transfers ===
In: Note: Flags indicate national team as defined under FIFA eligibility rules; some limited exceptions apply. Players may hold more than one non-FIFA nationality.

No.	Pos.	Nation	Player
1	GK	POL	Adam Stachowiak (Free from GKS Bełchatów)
9	MF	NED	Luís Pedro (Free from Heracles Almelo)
13	MF	BUL	Nikolay Pavlov (Free from Lyubimetz 2007)
14	DF	BUL	Veselin Minev (from Antalyaspor)
20	DF	NED	Marlon Pereira Freire (Free from Willem II)
71	MF	BUL	Boris Galchev (Free from Dinamo București)
83	DF	NED	Civard Sprockel (Free from CSKA Sofia)

Out: Note: Flags indicate national team as defined under FIFA eligibility rules; some limited exceptions apply. Players may hold more than one non-FIFA nationality.

No.	Pos.	Nation	Player
1	GK	BUL	Hristo Ivanov (Released)
10	MF	ESP	Rubén Palazuelos (Released)
17	MF	BUL	Ivaylo Dimitrov (Released)
20	MF	BUL	Lachezar Angelov (Loaned at Rakovski 2011)
21	DF	BUL	Radoslav Terziev (Loaned at Rakovski 2011)
23	GK	LTU	Ernestas Šetkus (Released)
28	DF	BUL	Lazar Marin (Loaned at Rakovski 2011)
89	DF	BUL	Stefan Stanchev (Released)
90	FW	BUL	Petar Atanasov (Loaned at Rakovski 2011)
92	FW	BFA	Habib Bamogo (Released)

== Matches ==
=== A Group ===
==== League table ====
Pos	Team	Pld	W	D	L	GF	GA	GD	Pts	Qualification or relegation
2	Levski Sofia	30	22	5	3	59	20	+39	71	Qualification for Europa League first qualifying round
3	CSKA Sofia	30	19	6	5	54	20	+34	63	Excluded from European competitions (Note: PFC CSKA Sofia were excluded from European competitions due to debts.)
4	Botev Plovdiv	30	18	6	6	51	21	+30	60	Qualification for Europa League first qualifying round
5	Litex Lovech	30	15	5	10	56	24	+32	50	
6	Chernomorets Burgas	30	14	5	11	32	28	+4	47	

Source: A PFG (in Bulgarian)
Rules for classification: 1st points; 2nd head-to-head points; 3rd head-to-head goal difference; 4th head-to-head goals scored; 5th head-to-head away goals scored; 6th goal difference; 7th goals scored

==== Results summary ====
Overall								Home						Away					
Pld	W	D	L	GF	GA	GD	Pts	W	D	L	GF	GA	GD	W	D	L	GF	GA	GD
30	18	6	6	51	21	+30	60	11	2	2	33	6	+27	7	4	4	18	15	+3

Last updated: 25 May 2013.
Source: Soccerway

==== Results by round ====
Round	1	2	3	4	5	6	7	8	9	10	11	12	13	14	15	16	17	18	19	20	21	22	23	24	25	26	27	28	29	30
Ground	H	A	H	H	A	H	A	H	A	H	A	H	A	H	A	A	H	A	A	H	A	H	A	H	A	H	A	H	A	H
Result	W	L	W	W	D	L	W	W	W	D	D	W	D	L	W	D	W	W	W	W	L	W	W	W	L	D	W	W	L	W
Position	2	5	4	3	4	5	4	3	3	3	4	3	4	6	5	5	5	5	5	4	5	4	4	3	4	4	4	4	4	4

A = Away; H = Home; W = Win; D = Draw; L = Loss

==== Results ====
11 August 2012 Round 1	Botev Plovdiv	3 – 0	Slavia	Plovdiv
18:00	Tsvetkov 37', 58', 78'; Tsvetkov (penalty missed) 41'; Vander (yellow card) 85'; Karaslavov (yellow card) 90+2'	Report	Petkov (yellow card) 39'; Kokonov (yellow card) 75'	Stadium: Hristo Botev; Attendance: 13,070; Referee: Ivaylo Stoyanov (Petrich)

19 August 2012 Round 2	Levski	3 – 1	Botev Plovdiv	Sofia
20:00	Raykov 15', 22'; Angelov 78'; Angelov (yellow card) 77'; Cristovão (yellow card) 79'	Report	Arthur Henrique 42'; Jirsák (yellow card) 24'; Grnčarov (yellow card) 82'	Stadium: Georgi Asparuhov; Attendance: 10,830; Referee: Hristo Ristoskov (Sandanski)

26 August 2012 Round 3	Botev Plovdiv	2 – 0	Chernomorets	Plovdiv
18:00	Vander 43'; Tsvetkov 54'; Palazuelos (yellow card); Hristov (yellow card)	Report		Stadium: Hristo Botev; Attendance: 10,000; Referee: Stanislav Todorov (Shumen)

1 September 2012 Round 4	Botev Plovdiv	3 – 1	Montana	Plovdiv
18:00	Vander 34'; Tsvetkov 55'; Ognyanov 84' (pen.); Ognyanov (yellow card) 60'	Report	Antonov 22'; Pashov (yellow card) 40'; Antonov (yellow card) 80'; Tsvetkovski (yellow card) 83'	Stadium: Hristo Botev; Attendance: 8,630; Referee: Atanas Dimitrov (Sliven)

15 September 2012 Round 5	Cherno More	0 – 0	Botev Plovdiv	Varna
17:00	Camazzola (yellow card) 29'; Popov (yellow card) 75'; Kitanov (yellow card) 85'	Report	Rahov (yellow card) 5'; Grnčarov (yellow card) 50'	Stadium: Ticha; Attendance: 3,670; Referee: Georgi Yordanov (Gabrovo)

22 September 2012 Round 6	Botev Plovdiv	1 – 2	Beroe	Plovdiv
17:00	Tsvetkov 86'; Vander (yellow card) 43'; Jirsák (yellow card) 63'	Report	Elias 14'; Andonov 56'; Velev (yellow card) 38' (yellow-red card) 45+1'; Penev (yellow card) 45+1'; Martins (yellow card) 79'; Akalski (yellow card) 89'; Caiado (yellow card) 90'; Ivanov (yellow card) 90+3'	Stadium: Hristo Botev; Attendance: 10,200; Referee: Nikolay Yordanov (Sofia)

29 September 2012 Round 7	Pirin Gotse Delchev	0 – 1	Botev Plovdiv	Gotse Delchev
17:00	Panayotov (yellow card) 33'; Lapantov (penalty missed) 33'	Report	Grnčarov 90+1'; Rahov (yellow card) 32'; Grnčarov (yellow card) 33'	Stadium: Gradski; Attendance: 3,200; Referee: Hristo Ristoskov (Blagoevgrad)

6 October 2012 Round 8	Botev Plovdiv	2 – 0	Lokomotiv Sofia	Plovdiv
16:00	Nedelev 51', 66'; Nedelev (yellow card) 66'	Report	Petrov (yellow card) 29'; Dobrev (yellow card) 62'; Telkiyski (yellow card) 75'	Stadium: Hristo Botev; Attendance: 8,200; Referee: Ahmed Ahmed (Burgas)

21 October 2012 Round 9	Litex	0 – 1	Botev Plovdiv	Lovech
18:00	Jelenković (yellow card) 12'; Slavchev (yellow card) 49'; Bodurov (yellow card) 56'	Report	Vander 45'; Rahov (yellow card) 23'; Ognyanov (yellow card) 53'; Vander (yellow card) 56'; Grnčarov (yellow card) 69'; Bamogo (yellow card) 83'	Stadium: Lovech; Attendance: 2,750; Referee: Ivaylo Stoyanov (Petrich)

27 October 2012 Round 10	Botev Plovdiv	1 – 1	CSKA	Plovdiv
16:00	Tsvetkov 41' (pen.); Grnčarov (yellow card) 30'; Nedelev (yellow card) 45+1'	Report	Tássio 80'; Krachunov (yellow card) 27'; Rodrigues (yellow card) 40'; Yanchev (yellow card) 59'; Popov (yellow card) 88'; Serginho (yellow card) 90+2'	Stadium: Hristo Botev; Attendance: 15,710; Referee: Tasko Taskov (Sofia)

4 November 2012 Round 11	Lokomotiv Plovdiv	2 – 2	Botev Plovdiv	Plovdiv
14:30	Abushev 13', 86'; V. Georgiev (yellow card) 83'; Kotev (yellow card) 89'; D. Georgiev (yellow card) 90+2'	Report	Nedelev 21', 57'; Grnčarov (yellow card) 11' (yellow-red card) 66'; Vander (yellow card) 15'	Stadium: Lauta; Attendance: 8,790; Referee: Stanislav Todorov (Shumen)

10 November 2012 Round 12	Botev Plovdiv	2 – 0	Minyor	Plovdiv
14:30	Tsvetkov 48', 76'; Jirsák (yellow card) 36'; Kostov (yellow card) 60'	Report	Okechukwu (yellow card) 35' (yellow-red card) 54'	Stadium: Hristo Botev; Attendance: 4,000; Referee: Radan Miryanov (Varna)

17 November 2012 Round 13	Botev Vratsa	0 – 0	Botev Plovdiv	Vratsa
14:30	Atanasov (yellow card) 40'; Hristov (yellow card) 60'	Report	Stanchev (yellow card) 54'; Palazuelos (yellow card) 61'; Vander (yellow card) 90+1'	Stadium: Hristo Botev; Attendance: 2,680; Referee: Stefan Spasov (Pernik)

28 November 2012 Round 14	Botev Plovdiv	0 – 1	Ludogorets	Plovdiv
14:30	Hristov (yellow card) 58'; Vander (yellow card) 90+6'	Report	Grnčarov 69' (o.g.); Moți (yellow card) 50'; Minev (yellow card) 68'; Burgzorg (yellow card) 83'; Ivanov (yellow card) 90+5'	Stadium: Hristo Botev; Attendance: 5,610; Referee: Tasko Taskov (Sofia)

8 December 2012 Round 15	Etar	1 – 2	Botev Plovdiv	Veliko Tarnovo
14:00	Arthur Henrique 22' (o.g.); Messina (yellow card) 2'; Petrov (yellow card) 87'	Report	Kostov 18'; Nedelev 85'; Jirsák (yellow card) 8'; Stanchev (yellow card) 52'; Ognyanov (yellow card) 59'; Atanasov (yellow card) 90+1'	Stadium: Ivaylo; Attendance: 650; Referee: Nikolay Yordanov (Sofia)

1 March 2013 Round 16	Slavia	2 – 2	Botev Plovdiv	Sofia
15:30	Ivanov 9'; Livramento 54'; P. Dimitrov (yellow card) 23'; Genev (yellow card) 45'	Report	Vander 20'; Ognyanov 51'; Vander (yellow card) 39'; Hristov (yellow card) 59'; Grnčarov (yellow card) 61'; Tsvetkov (yellow card) 66'; Galchev (yellow card) 85'	Stadium: Ovcha Kupel; Attendance: 1,100; Referee: Ahmed Ahmed (Burgas)

9 March 2013 Round 17	Botev Plovdiv	2 – 0	Levski	Plovdiv
15:00	Grnčarov 28'; Tsvetkov 64'; Arthur Henrique (yellow card) 32'; Jirsák (yellow card) 38'; Grnčarov (yellow card) 44'; Hristov (yellow card) 72'	Report	Pinto (yellow card) 39'; Angelov (yellow card) 40' (yellow-red card) 60'; Mulder (yellow card) 43'; Iliev (yellow card) 51'; Miliev (yellow card) 57'; Cristovão (yellow card) 69'	Stadium: Hristo Botev; Attendance: 14,290; Referee: Stanislav Todorov (Shumen)

15 March 2013 Round 18	Chernomorets	1 – 2	Botev Plovdiv	Burgas
17:00	Angelov 88'; Dyankov (yellow card) 58'; Ngeyitala (yellow card) 69'	Report	Vander 60'; Tsvetkov 66'; Galchev (yellow card) 68'; Rahov (yellow card) 72'	Stadium: Lazur; Attendance: 900; Referee: Georgi Yordanov (Gabrovo)

31 March 2013 Round 19	Montana	0 – 2	Botev Plovdiv	Montana
14:00	Shokolarov (yellow card) 18'; Kostadinov (yellow card) 47'; Brahimi (yellow card) 60'; Lahchev (yellow card) 68'; Lichkov (yellow card) 74'; Miracema (yellow card) 76'	Report	Nedelev 49'; Ognyanov 52'; Grnčarov (yellow card) 47'; Galchev (yellow card) 76'	Stadium: Ogosta; Attendance: 1,750; Referee: Nikola Popov (Sofia)

6 April 2013 Round 20	Botev Plovdiv	3 – 1	Cherno More	Plovdiv
17:00	Nedelev 19'; Ognyanov 35'; Pedro 80'; Pereira (yellow card) 49'; Minev (yellow card) 52'; Jirsák (yellow card) 90'	Report	Raykov 55'; Simeonov (yellow card) 42'	Stadium: Hristo Botev; Attendance: closed doors Referee: Stefan Spasov (Pernik)

10 April 2013 Round 21	Beroe	2 – 1	Botev Plovdiv	Stara Zagora
18:00	Hristov 4'; Andonov 16'; Louzeiro (yellow card) 28' (yellow-red card) 89'; Krumov (yellow card) 45+1'; Ivanov (yellow card) 90'	Report	Vander 64'; Pedro (yellow card) 28'; Grnčarov (yellow card) 44'; Galchev (yellow card) 57'; Jirsák (yellow card) 69'; Minev (yellow card) 82'; Kostov (yellow card) 90+2'	Stadium: Beroe; Attendance: 5,800; Referee: Vihren Manev (Sofia)

13 April 2013 Round 22	Botev Plovdiv	5 – 0	Pirin Gotse Delchev	Plovdiv
17:00	Pedro 33', 90+3'; Nedelev 35', 65'; Ognyanov 48'; Galchev (yellow card) 75'	Report		Stadium: Hristo Botev; Attendance: 3,560; Referee: Georgi Dimitrov (Sofia)

20 April 2013 Round 23	Lokomotiv Sofia	1 – 2	Botev Plovdiv	Sofia
17:00	Bibishkov 70'; Pavlov (yellow card) 54'	Report	Kostov 8'; Tsvetkov 75'; Minev (yellow card) 52'; Pavlov (yellow card) 90+2'	Stadium: Lokomotiv; Attendance: 2,160; Referee: Georgi Yordanov (Gabrovo)

28 April 2013 Round 24	Botev Plovdiv	1 – 0	Litex	Plovdiv
15:45	Tsvetkov 57'; Ognyanov (yellow card) 42'; Minev (yellow card) 59'; Hristov (yellow card) 84'	Report	Vajushi (yellow card) 48'; G. Milanov (yellow card) 52'; Bozhikov (yellow card) 54'	Stadium: Hristo Botev; Attendance: 8,190; Referee: Tsvetan Krastev (Varna)

4 May 2013 Round 25	CSKA	1 – 0	Botev Plovdiv	Sofia
19:30	Marcinho 51'; Sasha (yellow card) 73'; Bandalovski (yellow card) 86'	Report	Pavlov (yellow card) 90+1'; Dyakov (yellow card) 90+3'	Stadium: Balgarska Armiya; Attendance: 3,000; Referee: Nikola Popov (Sofia)

8 May 2013 Round 26	Botev Plovdiv	0 – 0	Lokomotiv Plovdiv	Plovdiv
17:00	Minev (yellow card) 24'; Pedro (yellow card) 45+1'	Report	Zlatinski (yellow card) 25'; Stefanov (yellow card) 56'; Kavdanski (yellow card) 62'; Abushev (yellow card) 70'; Kotev (yellow card) 72'; D. Geogiev (yellow card) 73'; Gospodinov (yellow card) 85'	Stadium: Hristo Botev; Attendance: 15,000; Referee: Gerogi Yordanov (Gabrovo)

13 May 2013 Round 27	Minyor	0 – 2	Botev Plovdiv	Sofia
18:00	Olegov (yellow card) 70'; D. Stoyanov (yellow card) 76'	Report	Tsvetkov 31', 85'; Jirsák (yellow card) 55' (yellow-red card) 90+3'	Stadium: Balgarska Armiya; Attendance: 290; Referee: Atanas Dimitrov (Sliven)

18 May 2013 Round 28	Botev Plovdiv	5 – 0	Botev Vratsa	Plovdiv
17:30	Tsvetkov 16' (pen.), 37'; Ognyanov 44'; Galchev 70'; Kostov 86'	Report	Mitov (red card) 13'; Nikolov (yellow card) 50'	Stadium: Hristo Botev; Attendance: 4,000; Referee: Georgi Dimitrov (Sofia)

22 May 2013 Round 29	Ludogorets	2 – 0	Botev Plovdiv	Razgrad
18:00	I. Stoyanov 8' (pen.), 20'; I. Stoyanov (penalty missed) 18'	Report		Stadium: Ludogorets Arena; Attendance: Martin Bogdev (Burgas); Referee: 3,000

Round 30	Botev Plovdiv	3 – 0	Etar
		Etar were excluded from competition due to financial problems

=== Bulgarian Cup ===
30 October 2012 Round 2 Leg 1	Eurocollege Plovdiv	0 – 3	Botev Plovdiv	Brestnik
17:00		Report	Vranchev 22' (o.g.); Karaslavov 28'; Dyakov 87'; Kostov (yellow card) 43' (yellow-red card) 71'; Gyuzelev (yellow card) 57'	Stadium: Berkut; Attendance: 500; Referee: Milen Dimitrov (Stara Zagora)

24 November 2012 Round 2 Leg 2	Botev Plovdiv	6 – 1	Eurocollege Plovdiv	Brestnik
11:00	Kostov 22', 29', 75'; Arthur Henrique 40'; Rahov 57'; Dyakov 80'; Marin (yellow card) 41'	Report	Vasilev 69' (pen.)	Stadium: Berkut; Attendance: 750; Referee: Mihail Tsonev (Sofia)

Botev won 9−1 on aggregate and qualified for the Third Round.

2 December 2012 Round 3 Leg 1	Slavia Sofia	3 – 0	Botev Plovdiv	Sofia
13:00	Zhelev 14'; P. Dimitrov 43', 75'; Genev (yellow card) 29'; Zhelev (yellow card) 54' (yellow-red card) 66'; Popara (yellow card) 83'; Dyakov (yellow card) 85'	Report	Jirsák (yellow card) 27'; Vander (yellow card) 29'; Bamogo (yellow card) 45+1'	Stadium: Ovcha Kupel; Attendance: 580; Referee: Aleksandar Kostadinov (Sofia)

16 December 2012 Round 3 Leg 2	Botev Plovdiv	0 – 1	Slavia Sofia	Plovdiv
16:00	Bamogo (yellow card) 27'; Stanchev (yellow card) 57'; Rahov (yellow card) 60'	Report	Popara 33'; Zlatkov (yellow card) 39'; Popara (yellow card); Zlatinov (yellow card)	Stadium: Hristo Botev; Attendance: 3,300; Referee: Georgi Yordanov (Gabrovo)

Slavia won 4−0 on aggregate. Botev is eliminated.

=== Friendlies ===
6 July 2012 Friendly	Botev Plovdiv	2 – 0	Vidima-Rakovski	Teteven
18:00	Ognyanov 56'; Atanasov 76'	Report		Stadium: Georgi Benkovski; Referee: Nikola Petrov

11 July 2012 Friendly	Botev Plovdiv	2 – 1	Bansko	Velingrad
18:30	Atanasov 54'; Nedelev 77'	Report	Lachov 90'	Stadium: Chepinets; Attendance: 300

14 July 2012 Friendly	Botev Plovdiv	0 – 0	Chernomorets Burgas	Velingrad
10:15		Report		Stadium: Chepinets; Referee: Vladimir Valkov

18 July 2012 Friendly	Botev Plovdiv (Bulgaria)	0 – 1	(Czech Republic) Dukla Prague	Bad Leonfelden, Austria
19:30		Report	Svatonský 61'

19 July 2012 Friendly	Botev Plovdiv (Bulgaria)	2 – 1	(Israel) Maccabi Haifa	Viehkirchen, Austria
18:00	Rahov 69'; Vander 80'	Report	Katan 27' (pen.)

21 July 2012 Friendly	Botev Plovdiv (Bulgaria)	4 – 2	(Czech Republic) Slovácko	Bad Leonfelden, Austria
17:00	Nedelev 21', 38'; Došek 63' (o.g.); Tsvetkov 90+1' (pen.)	Report	Volešák 47'; Košút 68'

26 July 2012 Friendly	Botev Plovdiv (Bulgaria)	2 – 2	(England) Wigan Athletic	Pichl bei Wels, Austria
19:00	Atanasov 38'; Tsvetkov 69' (pen.)	Report	Jones 23'; Boselli 54'

4 August 2012 Friendly	Botev Plovdiv (Bulgaria)	3 – 0	(Albania) Teuta Durrës	Plovdiv
17:45	Nedelev 6'; Sheta 27' (o.g.); Tsvetkov 32'	Report		Stadium: Plovdiv; Attendance: 7,000

8 September 2012 Friendly	Botev Plovdiv	4 – 0	Sliven	Plovdiv
17:00	Arthur Henrique 24'; Tsvetkov 51'; Gyuzelov 87'; Yakovlevsky 90+1'	Report		Stadium: Hristo Botev

12 October 2012 Friendly	Botev Plovdiv	4 – 0	Chavdar Etrople	Brestnik
17:00	Vander 13'; Ognyanov 35'; Dyakov 39'; Kostov 52'	Report		Stadium: Berkut; Referee: Georgi Kabakov

19 January 2013 Friendly	Botev Plovdiv	4 – 2	Svilengrad	Alexandroupolis, Greece
14:00	Atanasov 10'; Pavlov 23'; Rahov 82'; Dyakov 87'	Report	Sadakov 8'; Dimitrov 59'	Attendance: 300

23 January 2013 Friendly	Botev Plovdiv	2 – 0	Chavdar Etrople	Rakovski
14:00	Karaslavov 53'; Kostov 56'	Report		Stadium: Legia

29 January 2013 Friendly	Botev Plovdiv (Bulgaria)	2 – 2	(Russia) Khimki	Ayia Napa, Cyprus
15:00	Nedelev 8'; Pavlov 75' (pen.)	Report	Romaschenko 27' (pen.); Komkov 52'

3 February 2013 Friendly	Botev Plovdiv (Bulgaria)	1 – 1	(Poland) Korona Kielce	Ayia Napa, Cyprus
15:15	Dyakov 90'	Report	Kiercz 77'

6 February 2013 Friendly	Botev Plovdiv (Bulgaria)	2 – 0	(Czech Republic) Dukla Prague	Ayia Napa, Cyprus
15:00	Galchev 85'; Bamogo 89'	Report

9 February 2013 Friendly	Botev Plovdiv (Bulgaria)	2 – 2	(Czech Republic) Teplice	Larnaca, Cyprus
15:00	Kostov 69'; Vander 84'	Report	Vůch 50', 78'

12 February 2013 Friendly	Botev Plovdiv (Bulgaria)	1 – 7	(Czech Republic) Slovan Liberec	Larnaca, Cyprus
15:00	Nedelev 75' (pen.)	Report	Rabušic 23', 51'; Kušnír 30'; Pavelka 63'; N'Diaye 69'; Šural 83'; Hušek 86' (pen.)

14 February 2013 Friendly	Botev Plovdiv (Bulgaria)	3 – 2	(Russia) Rostov	Larnaca, Cyprus
15:30	Pedro 6'; Vander 54' (pen.); Saláta 90' (o.g.)	Report	Gațcan 37'; Kirichenko 48' (pen.)

23 February 2013 Friendly	Botev Plovdiv	2 – 1	Chernomorets Burgas	Dimitrovgrad
15:00	Tsvetkov 60'; Pavlov 77' (pen.); Pereira (yellow card) 62'; Minev (yellow card) 62' (yellow-red card) 63'; Dyakov (yellow card) 80'	Report	N’Lundulu 65' (pen.)	Stadium: Minyor; Attendance: 450; Referee: Pavlin Tyutyundzhyan

22 March 2013 Friendly	Botev Plovdiv	4 – 0	Vidima-Rakovski	Plovdiv
14:00	Kostov 11', 14', 73'; Pedro 75'	Report		Stadium: Hristo Botev; Attendance: 200

27 March 2013 Friendly	Botev Plovdiv	4 – 0	Rakovski	Brestnik
14:00	Pedro 7'; Kostov 17'; Pavlov 44'; Galchev 77'			Stadium: Berkut

17 April 2013 Friendly	Botev Plovdiv	1 – 1	Rakovski	Plovdiv
16:00	Chunchukov 68'	Report	Ploshtakov 35'	Stadium: Hristo Botev; Attendance: 400

== See also ==
- PFC Botev Plovdiv
