= 2014 Bulgarian Supercup =

Финал за Суперкупата на България 2014
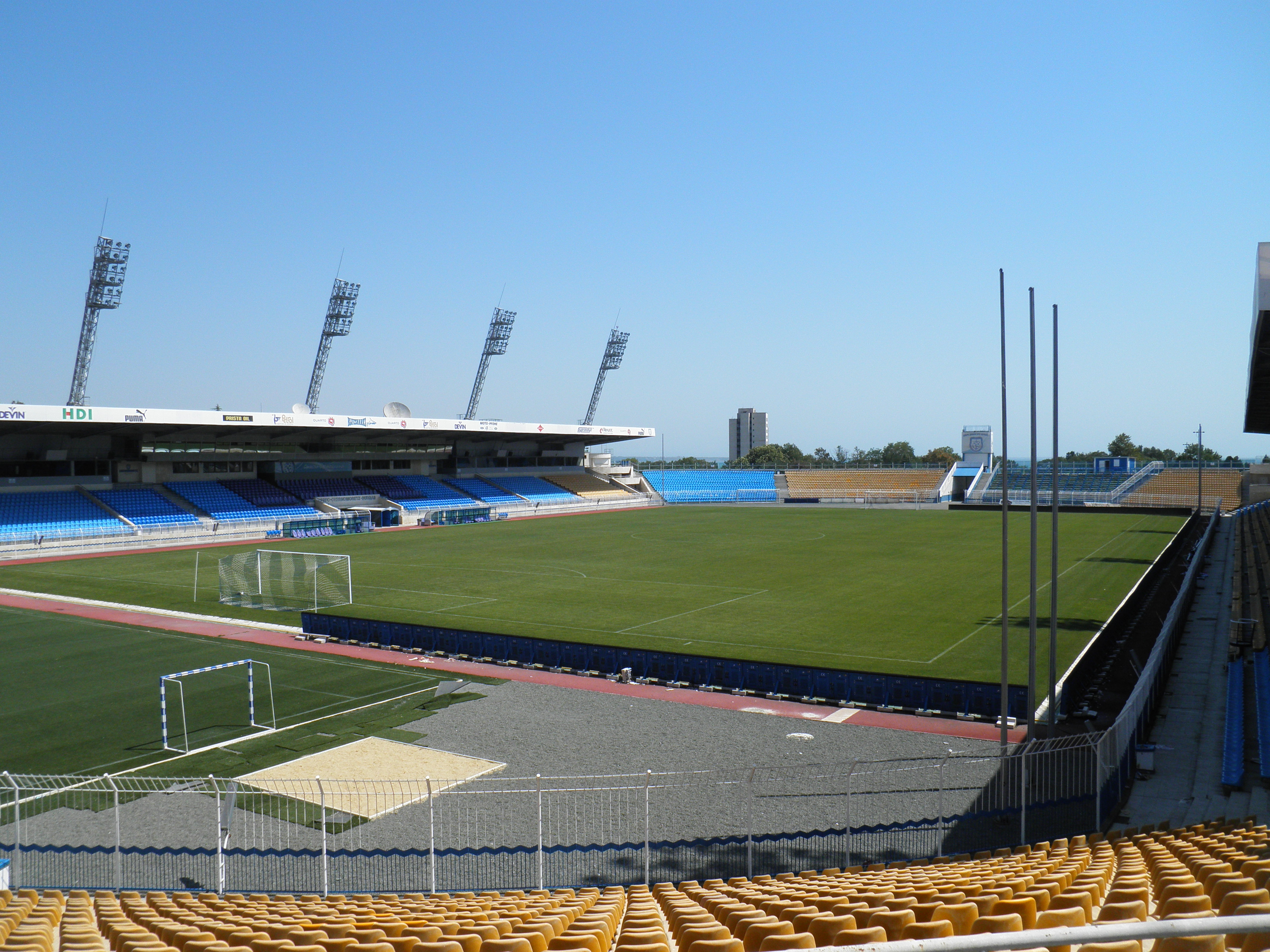
Ludogorets	Botev Plovdiv
A Group	Bulgarian Cup
3	1
- Date: 13 August 2014
- Venue: Lazur, Burgas
- Referee: Nikolay Yordanov (Sofia)
- Attendance: 5,500

The 2014 Bulgarian Supercup was the 12th Bulgarian Supercup, an annual Bulgarian football match played between the winners of the previous season's A Football Group and Bulgarian Cup. The game was played between the champions of the 2013–14 A PFG, Ludogorets Razgrad, and the 2014 Bulgarian Cup runners-up, Botev Plovdiv, since Ludogorets won both trophies.

This was Ludogorets's third Bulgarian Supercup appearance and Botev's first. Watched by a crowd of 5,500 at Lazur Stadium in Burgas, Ludogorets won the match 3–1 (thus securing a treble), with goals from Virgil Misidjan, Marcelinho and Hamza Younés, after Milen Gamakov had put Botev 1–0 up at half-time.

== Match overview ==
The first half was relatively even and saw both teams creating a number of good chances. Milen Gamakov opened the scoring in the 18th minute after Plamen Nikolov lay the ball in his path with a header following a foul (taken by Marian Ognyanov) that had been awarded to Botev Plovdiv. Just before half-time, Aleksandar Kolev had a claim for a penalty turned down by referee Nikolay Yordanov and was subsequently sent off for a second yellow card, presumably for a comment directed at the official. The official's decision was vociferously disputed by the Botev Plovdiv players and technical staff, with Adam Stachowiak receiving a caution for dissent. In the second half, Ludogorets Razgrad dominated the game, while Botev Plovdiv focused on the well-organized defense. Virgil Misidjan equalized the score in the 53rd minute after being picked out by Marcelinho and managing to get past Filip Filipov. Five minutes before the end of regular time, Marcelinho gave the team from Razgrad a 2:1 lead following a Hristo Zlatinski assist. In the 88th minute, Vladislav Stoyanov pulled off a save from a powerful header by Plamen Nikolov, after Ivan Tsvetkov has found an opening in the champions' defense. New signing and former yellow and blacks' forward Hamza Younés sealed the win for Ludogorets Razgrad in the closing stages of the match courtesy of another assist from Marcelinho.

== Match details ==
13 August 2014
20:30 EEST

Ludogorets Razgrad	3–1	Botev Plovdiv
Misidjan 53'; Marcelinho 85'; Younés 90+2'	Report	Gamakov 18'

Lazur, Burgas
Attendance: 5,500
Referee: Nikolay Yordanov (Sofia)

Ludogorets	Botev

GK	21	(Bulgaria) Vladislav Stoyanov
DF	80	(Brazil) Júnior Caiçara
DF	15	(Bulgaria) Aleksandar Aleksandrov	(yellow card) 36'	(substituted off) 46'
DF	27	(Romania) Cosmin Moți	(yellow card) 43'
DF	19	(Bulgaria) Aleksandar Vasilev
MF	18	(Bulgaria) Svetoslav Dyakov (c)
MF	23	(Bulgaria) Hristo Zlatinski
MF	7	(Bulgaria) Mihail Aleksandrov
MF	84	(Brazil) Marcelinho
MF	17	(Spain) Dani Abalo	(yellow card) 45+1'	(substituted off) 46'
FW	9	(Slovenia) Roman Bezjak	(yellow card) 15'	(substituted off) 69'
Substitutes:
GK	91	(Bulgaria) Ivan Čvorović
DF	4	(Finland) Tero Mäntylä	(yellow card) 60'	(substituted in) 46'
DF	20	(Brazil) Guilherme Choco
MF	8	(Portugal) Fábio Espinho
MF	12	(Madagascar) Anicet Abel
FW	93	(Netherlands) Virgil Misidjan		(substituted in) 46'
FW	99	(Tunisia) Hamza Younés		(substituted in) 69'
Manager:
(Bulgaria) Georgi Dermendzhiev

GK	1	(Poland) Adam Stachowiak	(yellow card) 45+4'
DF	28	(Bulgaria) Filip Filipov
DF	37	(Bulgaria) Rosen Kolev
DF	22	(Bulgaria) Plamen Nikolov
DF	24	(Bulgaria) Lazar Marin		(substituted off) 60'
MF	11	(Bulgaria) Yordan Hristov (c)
MF	38	(Bulgaria) Milen Gamakov
MF	7	(Bulgaria) Marian Ognyanov
MF	17	(Bulgaria) Lachezar Baltanov		(substituted off) 76'
FW	92	(Bulgaria) Aleksandar Kolev	(yellow card) 44' (yellow-red card) 45+2'
FW	23	(Bulgaria) Tsvetelin Chunchukov		(substituted off) 72'
Substitutes:
GK	89	(Bulgaria) Mihail Ivanov
DF	2	(Bulgaria) Vladimir Aytov		(substituted in) 76'
MF	20	(Bulgaria) Serkan Yusein
MF	30	(Bulgaria) Bozhidar Vasev		(substituted in) 60'
MF	95	(Bulgaria) Stanislav Dryanov
FW	10	(Brazil) Vander Vieira
FW	19	(Bulgaria) Ivan Tsvetkov		(substituted in) 72'
Manager:
(Bulgaria) Velislav Vutsov

Man of the Match:

MATCH OFFICIALS

- Assistant referees:
  - Ivan Valchev (Sofia)
  - Georgi Slavov (Pleven)
- Fourth official:
  - Nikola Popov (Sofia)

Match rules

- 90 minutes.
- Penalty shoot-out if scores level.
- Seven named substitutes, of which up to five may be used.

== Post-match reactions ==
In the aftermath of the match, Nikolay Yordanov's refereeing performance was severely criticized by manager Velislav Vutsov, Botev players, the management and fans, with the dismissal of Aleksandar Kolev viewed as the most controversial episode in the game. Aleksandar Kolev insisted that he had been fouled, denied having demanded a penalty kick, and even briefly considered retiring from football. Ludogorets were also lambasted by Botev supporters for supposedly having influenced the nature of the officiating. Ludogorets' executive director Angel Petrichev congratulated Botev Plovdiv for making it a tight match and agreed that it would have been better for the game if the referee had not shown a red card, while also maintaining that the whole blame should not be apportioned to Yordanov. Ludogorets manager Georgi Dermendzhiev did not sympathize with Botev Plovdiv's complaints against the referee and maintained that Ludogorets had managed to win without "giving it a 100%", but praised the young players of the opposing team. After the match, the referee's officiating rights were temporarily suspended.
