= Tomáš Jirsák =

Czech footballer (born 1984)

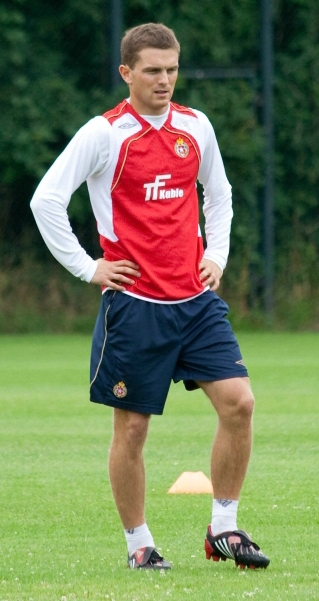
- Jirsák with Wisła Kraków in 2009

Personal information
- Date of birth: 29 June 1984 (age 42)
- Place of birth: Vysoké Mýto, Czechoslovakia
- Height: 1.72 m (5 ft 8 in)
- Position: Midfielder

Youth career
- 1990–1995: Sokol České Heřmanice
- 1995–1996: Vysoké Mýto
- 1996–1999: Agria Choceň
- 1999–2003: Hradec Králové

Senior career*
Years	Team	Apps	(Gls)
2003–2005	Hradec Králové	40	(5)
2005–2007	Teplice	52	(5)
2007–2012	Wisła Kraków	109	(6)
2012–2015	Botev Plovdiv	85	(6)
2015–2016	Irtysh Pavlodar	44	(1)
2017	Hradec Králové	18	(0)
2018	Sokol České Heřmanice		

International career
2004–2007	Czech Republic U21	22	(3)
- * Club domestic league appearances and goals

Tomáš Jirsák (born 29 June 1984) is a Czech former professional footballer who played as a midfielder.

== Club career ==
Jirsák played his first professional years with Hradec Králové, before moving to Teplice. In July 2007, he joined Polish Ekstraklasa side Wisła Kraków on a five-year contract for an undisclosed fee. In the 2007–08 season he won the Ekstraklasa championship with Wisła, contributing two goals and three assists in 20 matches. In the following 2008–09 season, he won a consecutive league title.

=== Botev Plovdiv ===
==== 2012–13 season ====
On 3 July 2012, Jirsák joined Botev Plovdiv. He made his debut in A Grupa on 11 August 2013 when Botev Plovdiv achieved a 3–0 win against Slavia Sofia. In his first season in the yellow-black kit, he was a regular first team player. Jirsák took part in 25 league games and one Bulgarian Cup fixture. Thanks to his contributions, Botev finished the 2012–13 A Grupa in fourth place.

==== 2013–14 ====
In his second season with the yellow-black jersey, Jirsák played in 47 matches (33 in A Grupa, 8 in Bulgarian Cup and 6 in UEFA Europa League. Thanks to him and his teammates, Botev Plovdiv finished fourth again and reached the final of the Bulgarian Cup.

On 7 July 2013, Jirsák scored his first goal for the club from about 25 metres against Astana in a Europa League match. Botev achieved a 0–1 away win. On 25 August, he sealed a 3–2 win over Slavia Sofia with a close range goal.

==== 2014–15 ====
Velislav Vutsov, the new manager of Botev Plovdiv for the 2014–15 season, assigned a more attacking role for Jirsák. He was among the goalscorers twice in his first three games in A Grupa. He scored against Cherno More Varna and Slavia Sofia, but he also received a red card at end of the dramatic 3–3 draw with Litex Lovech.

On 24 October, Jirsák scored the second goal for his team during the second half of the game against Beroe Stara Zagora in a 3–1 win.

On 2 November, Jirsák appeared in his 90th game for Botev. He is the foreign player with the most games played for the club.

On 8 November, Jirsák scored a goal after an assist by Marian Ognyanov during a 2–1 away win against Litex Lovech. His goal was later selected for the best goal in A Grupa in 2014.

As expected, Jirsák was in the starting lineup for the last three games of the regular season in A Grupa which were played in March 2015. His performance was crucial for the three consecutive wins, against Marek Dupnitsa, Lokomotiv Plovdiv, and CSKA Sofia.

On 5 April 2015, Jirsák became the first foreign player with 100 games for Botev.

Jirsák scored the only goal in a 3–1 defeat against Ludogorets Razgrad on 3 May 2015. He received a yellow card during the game with Litex Lovech and was banned for the next two games with CSKA Sofia and Beroe Stara Zagora. Jirsák returned to the starting lineup for a 0–2 home defeat from Lokomotiv Sofia. After the game, it was announced that the contacts of Jirsák and his friend, goalkeeper Adam Stachowiak, would not be renewed and both of them were to leave the club.

== International career ==
Jirsák was capped 22 times for Czech Republic national under-21 football team. He represented the country at the 2007 UEFA European Under-21 Football Championship.

== Career statistics ==
As of 1 June 2015

Appearances and goals by club, season and competition
Club	Season	League			Cup (Note: Includes Czech Cup, Polish Cup, Ekstraklasa Cup, Bulgarian Cup)		Europe		Total	
Club	Season	Division	Apps	Goals	Apps	Goals	Apps	Goals	Apps	Goals
Hradec Králové	2003–04	CNFL	16	0	1		—		17	0
Hradec Králové	2004–05	CNFL	24	5	2	2	—		26	7
Hradec Králové	Total		40	5	3	2	—		43	7
FK Teplice	2005–06	Czech First League	25	2	2	0	2 (Note: Appearances in UEFA Cup)	1	29	3
FK Teplice	2006–07	Czech First League	27	3	2	0	2 (Note: Appearances in UEFA Intertoto Cup)	0	31	3
FK Teplice	Total		52	5	4	0	4	1	60	6
Wisła Kraków	2007–08	Ekstraklasa	20	2	15	1	—		35	3
Wisła Kraków	2008–09	Ekstraklasa	24	0	4	1	6 (Note: Four appearances in UEFA Champions League, two appearances and one goal in UEFA Cup)	1	34	2
Wisła Kraków	2009–10	Ekstraklasa	27	2	5	0	2 (Note: Appearances in UEFA Champions League)	0	34	2
Wisła Kraków	2010–11	Ekstraklasa	19	1	2	0	4 (Note: Appearances in UEFA Europa League)	0	25	1
Wisła Kraków	2011–12	Ekstraklasa	19	1	5	0	4 (Note: One appearance in UEFA Champions League, three appearances in UEFA Europa League)	0	28	1
Wisła Kraków	Total		109	6	31	2	16	1	156	9
Botev Plovdiv	2012–13	A Group	25	0	1	0	—		26	0
Botev Plovdiv	2013–14	A Group	33	1	7	0	6	1	46	2
Botev Plovdiv	2014–15	A Group	27	5	2	1	4	0	33	6
Botev Plovdiv	Total		85	6	10	1	10	1	105	8
Career total			286	22	48	5	30	3	364	30

== Honours ==
Wisła Kraków

- Ekstraklasa: 2007–08, 2008–09, 2010–11

Botev Plovdiv

- Bulgarian Cup runner-up: 2014
- Bulgarian Supercup runner-up: 2014
- BNT Goal of the Year: 2014
