= Stanislav Kostov =

Bulgarian footballer

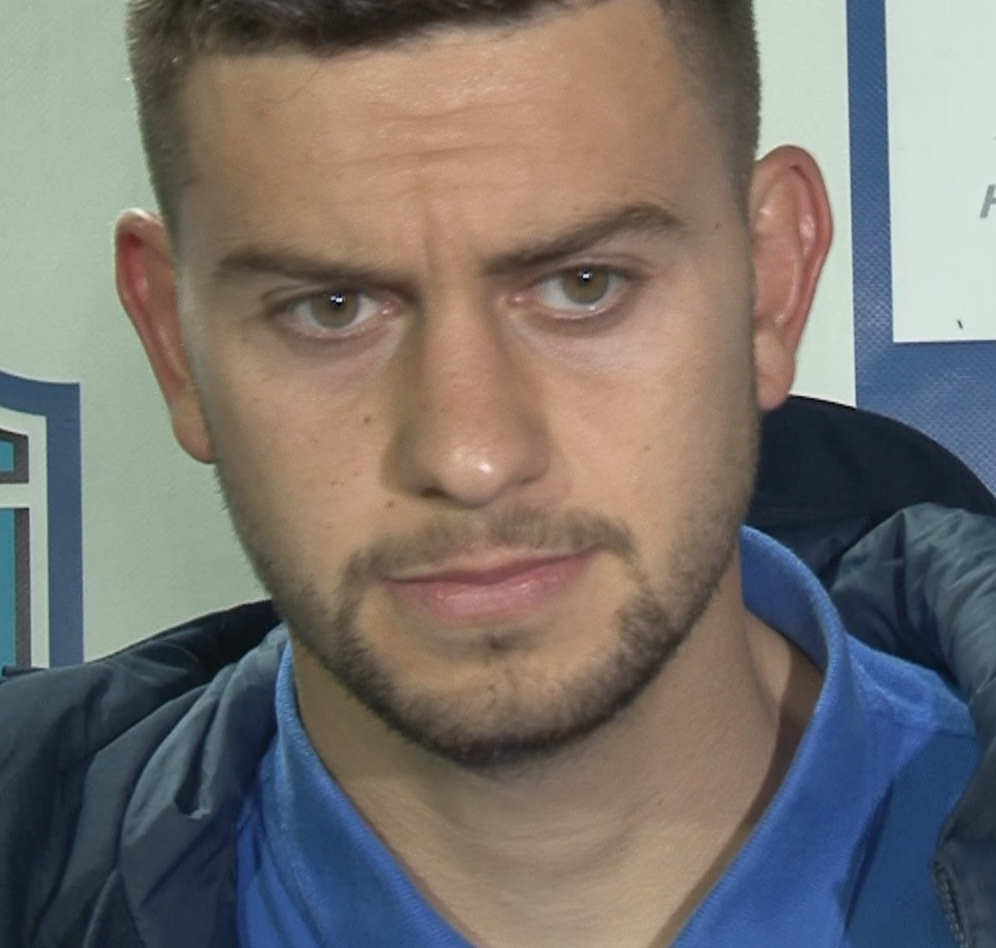

Personal information
- Full name: Stanislav Yordanov Kostov
- Date of birth: 2 October 1991 (age 35)
- Place of birth: Blagoevgrad, Bulgaria
- Height: 1.81 m (5 ft 11 in)
- Position: Forward

Team information
- Current team: Pirin Blagoevgrad
- Number: 29

Youth career
- –2009: Pirin 2001
- 2010: Pirin Blagoevgrad

Senior career*
Years	Team	Apps	(Gls)
2010	Pirin Blagoevgrad	12	(2)
2011–2012	CSKA Sofia	26	(3)
2012–2013	Botev Plovdiv	35	(3)
2014–2016	Beroe	42	(4)
2016–2017	Pirin Blagoevgrad	51	(16)
2018–2020	Levski Sofia	62	(27)
2020–2021	Olympiakos Nicosia	20	(1)
2021–2023	Pirin Blagoevgrad	45	(7)
2023	Lokomotiv Sofia	18	(1)
2023–	Pirin Blagoevgrad	72	(5)

International career^{‡}
2010–2012	Bulgaria U21	6	(0)
2018–	Bulgaria	3	(0)
- * Club domestic league appearances and goals as of 11 June 2026 ‡ National team caps and goals as of 12 May 2019

Stanislav Kostov (Bulgarian: Станислав Костов; born 2 October 1991) is a Bulgarian professional footballer who plays as a forward for Pirin Blagoevgrad.

== Club career ==
=== Pirin Blagoevgrad ===
Born in Blagoevgrad, Kostov began his career at Pirin 2001 as an important part of their youth team. In January 2010 he was scouted by Pirin Blagoevgrad. Kostov made his first-team debut in the 2010–11 season as a substitute against Sliven 2000 in a 2–1 league win on 7 August 2010. He netted his first goal, as he scored the winning strike in a 2–1 home victory over Lokomotiv Sofia on 11 September. In the game, he also assisted Boris Kondev for the first goal and won the Man of the Match award. On 25 September 2010, in a home match versus Minyor Pernik, Stanislav scored the only goal for Pirin in a 1–1 draw. On 16 October he assisted Boris Kondev for the opening goal in a match against Levski Sofia, but Pirin went on to lose the game 4–1.

=== CSKA Sofia ===
After a good first half of the season with Pirin, Kostov caught the eye of the major Bulgarian clubs CSKA Sofia and Levski Sofia. After a tough transfer battle for the youngster, Kostov finally decided to sign with CSKA. He made 21 appearances for CSKA, scoring 3 goals.

=== Botev Plovdiv ===
On 22 June 2012, Botev Plovdiv signed Kostov on a season-long loan deal, with the option of making the move permanent. On 10 August, Botev exercised the option to buy 100% of Kostov's contract. He signed a two-year contract. The following day, Kostov made his debut in a 3–0 win over Slavia Sofia, coming on as a substitute for Vander. His first goals came on 24 November, in a 6–1 home win over FC Eurocollege in the Bulgarian Cup, scoring a hat-trick.

=== Beroe ===
In February 2014, Kostov signed a contract with Beroe Stara Zagora.

=== Pirin Blagoevgrad ===
Kostov returned to his home club in the season 2016/17. Scoring 16 goals in 51 games, he was the team's top striker and an unchangeable starter. During the winter break of the 2017–18 season he left for Levski Sofia.

=== Levski Sofia ===
After coming to Sofia, Kostov had a disappointing half a season in Levski Sofia. But during the second season of his spell there he started the season with 13 goals in just 14 appearances, the likes of which no other Bulgarian striker has done in the past 12 years since Georgi Ivanov, thus converting himself into a regular starter. Kostov scored 24 goals in 38 matches with Levski by the end of his second season and became the top scorer of the league.

== International career ==
Kostov earned his first cap for Bulgaria on 16 November 2018, coming on as a late second-half substitute for Simeon Slavchev in the 1–1 away draw with Cyprus in a UEFA Nations League match.

== Personal life ==
Kostov became a father of a daughter in 2019.

== Career statistics ==
As of 29 March 2024

Appearances and goals by club, season and competition
Club	Season	League		Cup		Europe		Other		Total	
Club	Season	Apps	Goals	Apps	Goals	Apps	Goals	Apps	Goals	Apps	Goals
Pirin Blagoevgrad	2010–11	12	1	1	0	–	–	–	–	13	1
CSKA Sofia	2010–11	3	1	0	0	0	0	1	0	4	1
CSKA Sofia	2011–12	18	2	2	0	1	0	–	–	21	2
CSKA Sofia	Total	21	3	2	0	1	0	0	0	25	3
Botev Plovdiv	2012–13	22	2	1	0	–	–	–	–	23	2
Botev Plovdiv	2013–14	13	0	3	2	4	0	–	–	20	2
Botev Plovdiv	Total	35	2	4	2	4	0	0	0	43	4
Beroe Stara Zagora	2013–14	6	0	0	0	–	–	–	–	6	0
Beroe Stara Zagora	2014–15	20	2	3	1	–	–	–	–	23	3
Beroe Stara Zagora	2015–16	16	2	4	1	1	0	–	–	21	3
Beroe Stara Zagora	Total	42	4	7	2	1	0	0	0	49	6
Pirin Blagoevgrad	2016–17	32	10	2	0	–	–	–	–	34	10
Pirin Blagoevgrad	2017–18	19	6	1	0	–	–	–	–	20	6
Pirin Blagoevgrad	Total	51	16	3	0	0	0	0	0	54	16
Levski Sofia	2017–18	12	3	0	0	0	0	–	–	12	3
Levski Sofia	2018–19	35	24	1	0	2	0	–	–	38	24
Levski Sofia	2019–20	15	0	2	0	2	0	–	–	19	0
Levski Sofia	Total	62	27	3	0	4	0	0	0	69	27
Olympiakos Nicosia	2020–21	20	1	5	1	–	–	–	–	25	2
Pirin Blagoevgrad	2021–22	30	6	2	0	–	–	–	–	32	6
Pirin Blagoevgrad	2022–23	15	1	1	0	–	–	–	–	16	1
Pirin Blagoevgrad	Total	45	7	3	0	0	0	0	0	48	7
Lokomotiv Sofia	2022–23	18	1	3	0	–	–	–	–	21	1
Pirin Blagoevgrad	2023–24	16	0	1	0	–	–	–	–	17	0
Career total		310	58	31	5	10	0	1	0	365	63

== Honours ==
CSKA Sofia

- Bulgarian Cup: 2010–11
- Bulgarian Supercup: 2011

Botev Plovdiv

- Bulgarian Cup runner-up: 2013–14

Levski Sofia

- Bulgarian Cup runner-up: 2017–18

Individual

- First League top scorer: 2018–19
