= Ivaylo Dimitrov =

Ivaylo Dimitrov may refer to:

- Ivaylo Dimitrov (footballer, born 1987), Bulgarian football right back for Lokomotiv Plovdiv
- Ivaylo Dimitrov (footballer, born 1989), Bulgarian football winger for Dobrudzha Dobrich
