= Arthur Henrique (footballer, born 1987) =

Brazilian footballer

Personal information
- Full name: Arthur Henrique Ricciardi Oyama
- Date of birth: 14 January 1987 (age 39)
- Place of birth: São Paulo, Brazil
- Height: 1.78 m (5 ft 10 in)
- Position: Left-back

Youth career
- 2006–2007: Santo André

Senior career*
Years	Team	Apps	(Gls)
2008–2012	Santo André	20	(0)
2010–2011	→ Grêmio Prudente (loan)	5	(0)
2011	→ Nacional (loan)	0	(0)
2012–2014	Botev Plovdiv	33	(1)
2014–2016	Lokeren	5	(0)
2017–2019	Floriana	40	(6)
2019–2020	Gżira United	11	(0)
2020	→ Sliema Wanderers (loan)	6	(1)
2020–2022	Ħamrun Spartans	29	(2)
- * Club domestic league appearances and goals as of 20:16, 20 July 2022 (UTC)

Arthur Henrique Ricciardi Oyama (born 14 January 1987), also known simply as Arthur or Arthur Henrique, is a Brazilian professional footballer who plays as a left-back.

== Career statistics ==
(Correct as of 1 May 2019)

Appearances and goals by club, season and competition
Club	Season	League		State League		Cup		Continental		Total	
Club	Season	Apps	Goals	Apps	Goals	Apps	Goals	Apps	Goals	Apps	Goals
Santo André	2009	19	0	7	0	0	0			26	0
Santo André	2010	1	0	3	0	0	0			4	0
Grêmio Prudente	2010	5	0	0	0	0	0			5	0
Nacional (loan)	2010–11	0	0			0	0			0	0
Santo André (loan)	2012	0	0	11	1	0	0			11	1
Botev Plovdiv	2012–13	24	1			2	0			26	1
Botev Plovdiv	2013–14	9	0			4	0	1	0	14	0
Lokeren	2014–15	5	0			1	0	0	0	6	0
Lokeren	2015–16	0	0			0	0			0	0
Floriana	2017–18	15	1			0	0	2	0	17	1
Floriana	2018–19	25	5			0	0			25	5
Total		103	7	21	1	7	0	3	0	134	8

== Honours ==
Santo André

- Campeonato Paulista Série A2: 2008
