= Vander Vieira =

Brazilian footballer

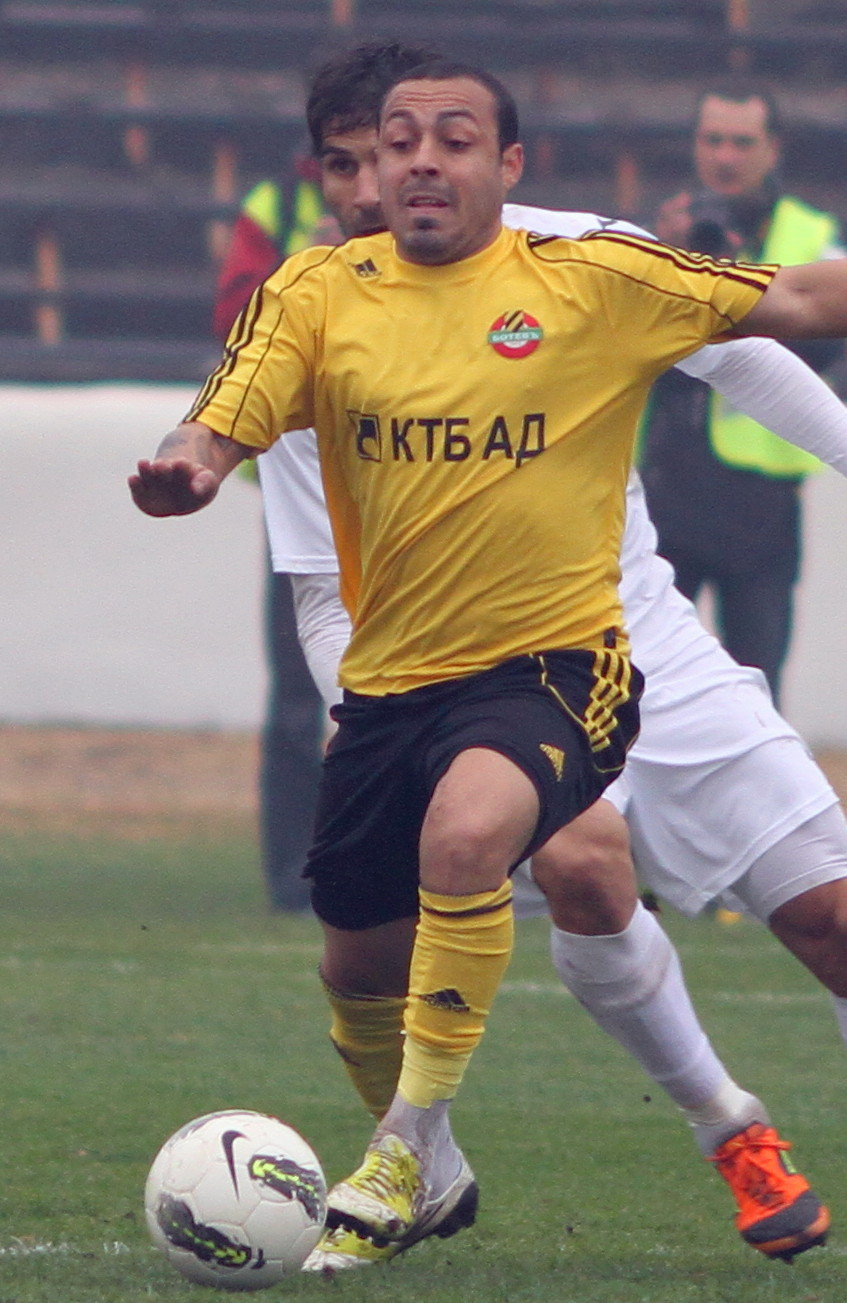
- Vander playing for Botev Plovdiv

Personal information
- Full name: Vander Sacramento Vieira
- Date of birth: 3 October 1988 (age 38)
- Place of birth: Rio de Janeiro, Brazil
- Height: 1.74 m (5 ft 8 1/2 in)
- Positions: Winger; attacking midfielder

Youth career
- 1998: Madureira
- 1999–2009: Flamengo

Senior career*
| Years | Team | Apps | (Gls) |
| 2009–2010 | Flamengo | 0 | (0) |
| 2009 | → America (loan) | 0 | (0) |
| 2010 | → Duque de Caxias (loan) | 3 | (0) |
| 2011–2012 | Democrata-GV | 0 | (0) |
| 2011–2012 | → Ipatinga (loan) | 12 | (2) |
| 2012–2014 | Botev Plovdiv | 51 | (9) |
| 2014–2015 | AEK Larnaca | 28 | (4) |
| 2015–2017 | APOEL | 58 | (9) |
| 2017–2018 | Al-Sharjah | 18 | (7) |
| 2018–2020 | Ajman | 42 | (13) |
| 2021 | Always Ready | 12 | (1) |
| 2021 | Sport | 0 | (0) |
| 2022–2023 | Ethnikos Achna | 27 | (13) |
| 2023–2024 | Al Arabi | 8 | (4) |
- * Club domestic league appearances and goals as of 13 December 2023

Vander Sacramento Vieira (born 2 March 1988 in Rio de Janeiro), sometimes known as just Vander, is a Brazilian professional footballer who plays as a winger.

== Career ==
=== Early career ===
The young midfielder started in Madureira, and in 1998, aged 10, was taken to Flamengo's youth team, where he began to stand out. Fast, with both legs as his head, Vander Vieira characteristics including good passing and shooting, in addition to the torn speed. In 2008, came to be negotiated with Portuguese teams, however, the transfer did not materialize because of the player desire to continue in Estádio da Gávea.

In 2007, the player, which until then was a reserve team led by luxury coach and former player Adílio, became the proprietor, and helped the team win third place in the Champions Youth Cup, world interclub of the U-19 category in Malaysia.

=== Flamengo and America ===
In 2009, he became promoted to the senior team would be headed by Cuca, but no space was borrowed by the board the scarlet-black, through the former Flamengo striker Romário, who try to America access to the first division Campeonato Carioca the following year. The idea was to make the player gain experience ahead of time will create red. Nevertheless, Vander Vieira even took the field by Devil and returned to the Estádio da Gávea yet that season, but no act by Flamengo.

=== Duque de Caxias ===
In 2010, Vander Vieira was loaned to Duque de Caxias to compete in the Campeonato Carioca that year, as the scarlet-black cast, which featured a veritable constellation, no room for a young player finally debuted with the Robe. In September the same year Vander returned to the club for part of the cast of the Flamengo in the Campeonato Brasileiro Sub-23.

=== Botev Plovdiv ===
On 13 July 2012, Vander Vieira moved to Europe to sign for Bulgarian first division club Botev Plovdiv. He took part in 23 games and scored 6 goals during his first season in the A Group, establishing himself as a key factor in the squad. His second season proved to be however less efficient. He participated in 26 games primarily as a right winger or secondary striker, contributing with 3 goals.

Although Vander Vieira was among the favorite players of the fans, he appeared only in three matches for Botev Plovdiv in the 2013-14 UEFA Europa League campaign and did not become a key player, because of injuries and fatigue. He came on as a substitute in the final of 2013–14 Bulgarian Cup against Ludogorets Razgrad, but at the very end of the game he was sent off after a rough tackle. Vander remained an unused substitute during the match for the Bulgarian Supercup 2014.

He was released by the club on August 31, 2014 after playing in only 2 games during the 2014-15 A PFG season, amidst Botev's financial problems.

=== AEK Larnaca ===
On 31 August 2014, he signed a one-year contract, with the option of a further season with Cypriot side AEK Larnaca. In his first season in Cyprus, Vander was voted as the best foreign player of the 2014–15 Cypriot First Division, as he appeared in 28 league matches and scored 4 goals, helping AEK Larnaca to finish in the 2nd place for the first time in their history.

=== APOEL ===
On 29 May 2015, Vander Vieira signed a three-year contract with fellow Cypriot First Division team APOEL, for a transfer fee of €100,000. He made his official debut on 21 July 2015, in his team's 1–1 away draw against FK Vardar for the second qualifying round of the UEFA Champions League. He scored his first goal for the club against his former team AEK Larnaca on 12 September 2015, in APOEL's 2–2 away draw for the Cypriot First Division. At the end of the season he crowned champion for the first time in his career, as his team managed to win the Cypriot First Division title for a fourth time in the row.

On 2 August 2016, Vander Vieira scored the second goal in APOEL's 3–0 home victory against Rosenborg BK for the third qualifying round of the UEFA Champions League, as his team overturned a 2–1 loss in Norway and reached the play-off round of the competition.

== Career statistics ==
As of 24 May 2017

| Club | Season | League | | Cup | | Continental | | Other | | Total | |
| Club | Season | Apps | Goals | Apps | Goals | Apps | Goals | Apps | Goals | Apps | Goals |
| Brazil | | Série B | | Copa do Brasil | | Continental | | Carioca | | Total | |
|---|---|---|---|---|---|---|---|---|---|---|---|
| Duque de Caxias (loan) | 2010 | 3 | 0 | 0 | 0 | — | | 14 | 0 | 17 | 0 |
| Brazil | | Série D | | Copa do Brasil | | Continental | | Mineiro | | Total | |
| Democrata-GV | 2011 | — | | 0 | 0 | — | | 8 | 2 | 8 | 2 |
| Brazil | | Série C | | Copa do Brasil | | Continental | | Mineiro | | Total | |
| Ipatinga (loan) | 2011 | 12 | 2 | 0 | 0 | — | | — | | 12 | 2 |
| Bulgaria | | A Group | | Bulgarian Cup | | Europe | | Bulgarian Supercup | | Total | |
| Botev Plovdiv | 2012–13 | 23 | 6 | 1 | 0 | — | | — | | 24 | 6 |
| Botev Plovdiv | 2013–14 | 26 | 3 | 8 | 0 | 3 (Note: Appearances in UEFA Europa League) | 1 | — | | 37 | 4 |
| Botev Plovdiv | 2014–15 | 2 | 0 | 0 | 0 | — | | 0 | 0 | 2 | 0 |
| Botev Plovdiv | Total | 51 | 9 | 9 | 0 | 3 | 1 | 0 | 0 | 63 | 10 |
| Cyprus | | First Division | | Cypriot Cup | | Europe | | Cypriot Super Cup | | Total | |
| AEK Larnaca | 2014–15 | 28 | 4 | 6 | 1 | — | | — | | 34 | 5 |
| APOEL | 2015–16 | 30 | 6 | 4 | 0 | 10 (Note: Appearances in UEFA Champions League and UEFA Europa League) | 0 | 0 | 0 | 44 | 6 |
| APOEL | 2016–17 | 28 | 3 | 4 | 1 | 13 | 1 | 1 | 0 | 46 | 5 |
| APOEL | Total | 58 | 9 | 8 | 1 | 23 | 1 | 1 | 0 | 90 | 11 |
| Career total | | 152 | 24 | 23 | 2 | 26 | 2 | 23 | 2 | 224 | 30 |

== Honours ==
Botev Plovdiv

  - Bulgarian Cup Runner-up: 2013–14
  - Bulgarian Supercup Runner-up: 2014

APOEL

- Cypriot First Division: 2015–16, 2016–17
