= Yordan Hristov =

Bulgarian footballer (born 1984)

Personal information
- Full name: Yordan Georgiev Hristov
- Date of birth: 12 February 1984 (age 42)
- Place of birth: Plovdiv, Bulgaria
- Height: 1.81 m (5 ft 11 in)
- Positions: Right-back; defensive midfielder; winger

Senior career*
Years	Team	Apps	(Gls)
2004–2007	Maritsa Plovdiv	50	(4)
2007–2011	Spartak Plovdiv	92	(13)
2011–2016	Botev Plovdiv	150	(1)
2016–2017	Ermis Aradippou	27	(0)
2018	Maritsa Plovdiv	13	(1)

International career
2013–2014	Bulgaria	4	(0)
- * Club domestic league appearances and goals

Yordan Hristov (Bulgarian: Йордан Христов; born 12 February 1984) is a Bulgarian former professional footballer who played as a right-back.

== Club career ==
=== Early career ===
Hristov started to play football in FC Plovdiv 95 in his home town Plovdiv. His first coaches were Stefan Tahchiev and Petar Dafchev and in 1999 the team won the silver medals in the National Children Football League in Sofia. Then in 2002 he joined Maritsa Plovdiv and had an important role there from 2005 to 2007. In 2007 his former coach brought him to Spartak Plovdiv and after some strong performances he became captain of the team.

=== Botev Plovdiv ===
==== 2011–12 season ====
After Spartak voluntarily relegated in Bulgaria's third division in 2011 he signed with Botev Plovdiv and became momentous part of the team scoring the crucial goals in the 1/16 final and 1/8 final cup matches against Botev Vratsa and Chernomorets Burgas. During this season Hristov played as a midfielder.

==== 2012–13 ====
Hristov was among the few player which were not released by the club after the promotion to A Grupa. The new manager of Botev Plovdiv Ferario Spasov changed his position and started using him as a right-back. Yordan made a debut in A Grupa on 26 August 2012 during the 2–0 win against Chernomorets Burgas. He initially became substitute for Stefan Stanchev but gradually established himself as a regular member of the starting lineup.

==== 2013–14 ====
During season 2013–14 Stanimir Stoilov used Hristov only as a right-back. His good performance in Europa League and A Grupa caught the attention of the Bulgaria head coach Lyuboslav Penev and he earned his first caps for Bulgaria.

==== 2014–15 ====
Yordan Hristov was among the few players who accepted a pay cut and remained at the club despite the financial crisis. Botev Plovdiv hired Velislav Vutsov as a new manager. He made Hristov a vice-captain and asked him to play several different roles as a defender or midfielder depending on the tactics of the rival teams. As a key played Hristov participated in all official games and did not miss even a minute during the matches July, August and September.

On 7 December, Hristov made an assist for the second goal scored by Lachezar Baltanov during the 2–0 win over PFC Haskovo.

==== 2015–16 ====
Yordan Hristov was selected as the new captain of Botev Plovdiv after the retirement of Ivan Tsvetkov. He played on his regular position as a right-back during the 1–1 draw with Levski Sofia in the first round of A Grupa. On 25 July he was sent off during the shocking defeat from PFC Montana.

On 17 October 2015, Hristov scored magnificent goal against the local rivals from Lokomotiv Plovdiv but it was not enough and Botev Plovdiv was defeated with 2–1.

On 12 April 2016, Bulgarian newspaper accused Hristov for organizing a coup against the manager Nikolay Kostov. Later that day both of them officially declined to have any problems in their professional relationship on the website of the club.

The contact of Yordan Hristov was not renewed and he left the team after the end of season 2015–16.

=== Maritsa Plovdiv ===
In December 2017, Hristov returned to his hometown club Maritsa Plovdiv. He left the club at the end of the 2017–18 season following the relegation to Third League.

== International career ==
After some impressing performances during the 2012–13 season Bulgaria head coach Lyuboslav Penev called Hristov for the friendly games against Japan and Kazakhstan on 30 May and 5 June 2013. He made his debut on 30 May against Japan when he came as a substitution for Stanislav Manolev in the 79th minute.

== Career statistics ==
=== Club ===
Appearances and goals by club, season and competition
Club	Season	League		Total	
Club	Season	Apps	Goals	Apps	Goals
Maritsa	2004-05	5	0	5	0
Maritsa	2005–06	23	2	23	2
Maritsa	2006–07	22	2	22	2
Maritsa	Total	50	4	50	4
Spartak Plovdiv	2007–08	26	3	26	3
Spartak Plovdiv	2008–09	25	2	25	2
Spartak Plovdiv	2009–10	11	1	11	1
Spartak Plovdiv	2010–11	26	6	26	6
Spartak Plovdiv	Total	92	13	92	13
Botev Plovdiv	2011–12	26	0	26	0
Botev Plovdiv	2012–13	26	0	26	0
Botev Plovdiv	Total	52	0	52	0
Career total		191	16	191	16

== Honours ==
Botev Plovdiv

- Bulgarian Cup runner-up: 2014
- Bulgarian Supercup runner-up: 2014
