= Bogomil Dyakov =

Bulgarian footballer

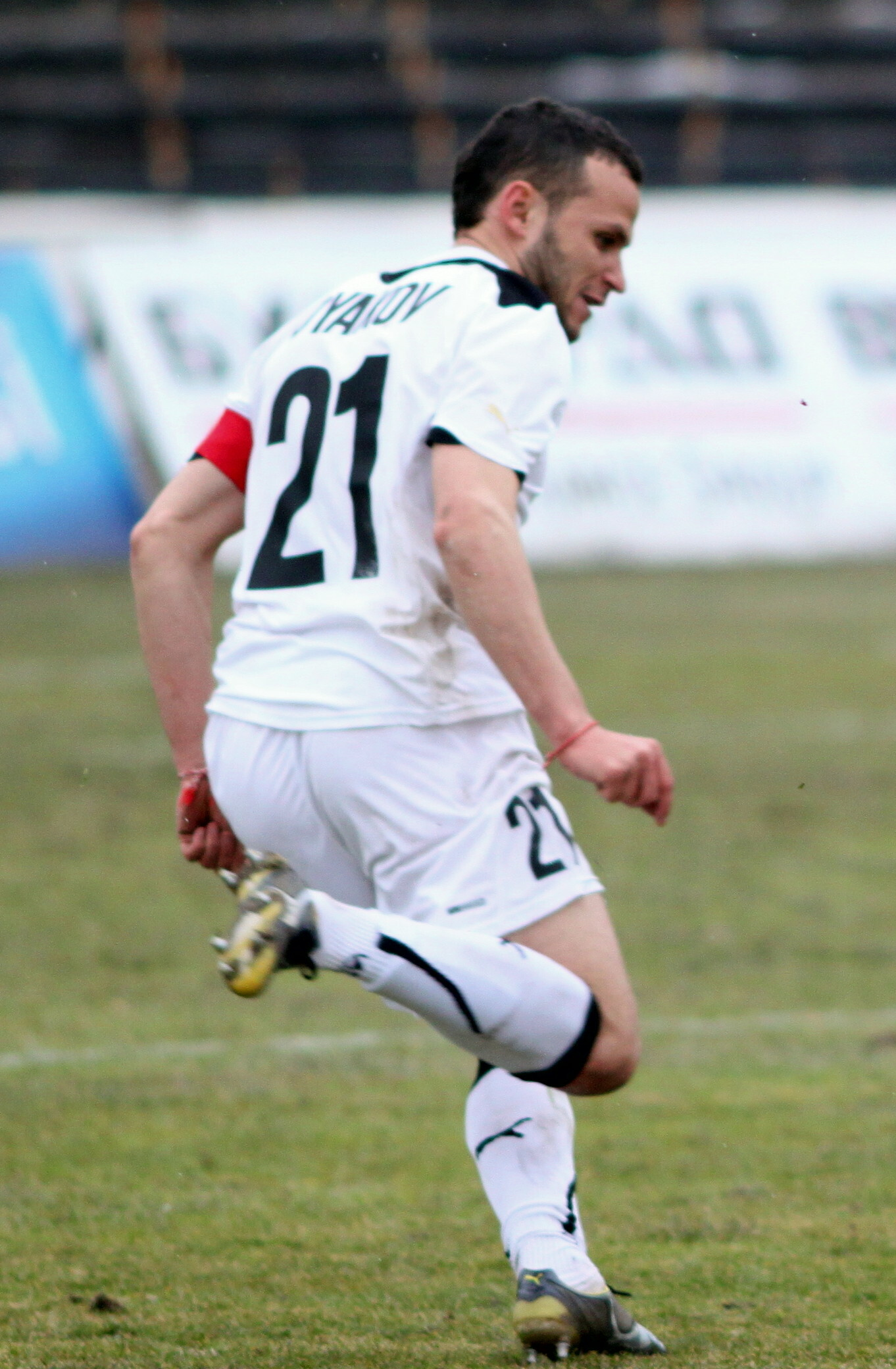

Personal information
- Full name: Bogomil Yankov Dyakov
- Date of birth: 12 April 1984 (age 42)
- Place of birth: Dupnitsa, Bulgaria
- Height: 1.72 m (5 ft 8 in)
- Position: Right back

Team information
- Current team: CSKA 1948 U11 (youth manager)

Youth career
- Levski Sofia

Senior career*
Years	Team	Apps	(Gls)
2001–2006	Levski Sofia	11	(0)
2002–2003	→ Pirin Blagoevgrad (loan)	?	(?)
2003–2005	→ Rodopa Smolyan (loan)	50	(0)
2006	→ Rodopa Smolyan (loan)	14	(0)
2007	Spartak Varna	12	(0)
2007–2013	Slavia Sofia	106	(0)
2013–2014	Montana	19	(0)
2014–2015	Lokomotiv Plovdiv	20	(0)
2015	Pirin Blagoevgrad	6	(0)
2016	Spartak Pleven	12	(0)
2016–2018	Septemvri Sofia	48	(0)
2018–2019	CSKA 1948	45	(0)
2020	Vitosha Bistritsa	14	(0)
Total		357	(0)

International career
2004–2005	Bulgaria U21		

Managerial career
- 2020–: CSKA 1948 U11
- * Club domestic league appearances and goals

Bogomil Dyakov (Bulgarian: Богомил Дяков; born 12 April 1984) is a Bulgarian former professional footballer who played as a defender.

== Playing career ==
=== Early career ===
Dyakov came through the youth ranks at Levski Sofia. In his time at the club he made eleven first team appearances in the league. He made his debut during the 2001–02 season, but struggled to get into the first team and spent loan spells at Pirin Blagoevgrad and Rodopa Smolyan.

In June 2005, Dyakov returned to Levski Sofia. He made 10 appearances and collected his first A PFG title winner's medal at the end of the 2005–06 season. In the 2006 Summer transfer window he was loaned out again to Rodopa Smolyan.

=== Spartak Varna ===
On 18 December 2006, Dyakov joined Spartak Varna on a permanent basis.

=== Slavia Sofia ===
On 1 June 2007, it was officially announced that Dyakov had signed for Slavia Sofia on a long-term deal, for an undisclosed fee. He made his league debut on 12 August 2007 in a 2–0 home win against Beroe Stara Zagora. In November 2010, Dyakov was selected by manager Emil Velev for captain of the team.

In pre-season training for the 2011–12 A PFG season, Dyakov ruptured his anterior cruciate ligament and meniscus, and received surgery. His recovery was said to take up to six months. He made his comeback for Slavia from a serious knee injury on 8 February 2012, playing for 25 minutes in a 2–1 friendly loss against Kolkheti-1913 Poti.

== Managerial career ==
In October 2020, few days after Vitosha Bistritsa exclude their first team from the league, Dyakov announced his retirement from active football and joined CSKA 1948 Academy as head coach of Under 11 team. In the summer of 2025, he began working at Slavia Sofia's youth academy.

== Career statistics ==
Appearances and goals by club, season and competition
Club	Season	League			Bulgarian Cup		Europe		Total	
Club	Season	Division	Apps	Goals	Apps	Goals	Apps	Goals	Apps	Goals
Levski Sofia	2001–02	A PFG	1	0	0	0	0	0	1	0
Levski Sofia	2005–06	A PFG	10	0	0	0	0	0	10	0
Levski Sofia	Total		10	0	0	0	0	0	10	0
Rodopa Smolyan	2003–04	A PFG	23	0	0	0	–		23	0
Rodopa Smolyan	2004–05	A PFG	27	0	0	0	–		27	0
Rodopa Smolyan	Total		50	0	0	0	0	0	50	0
Rodopa Smolyan	2006–07	A PFG	14	0	1	0	–		15	0
Spartak Varna	2006–07	A PFG	12	0	0	0	–		12	0
Slavia Sofia	2007–08	A PFG	15	0	2	0	–		17	0
Slavia Sofia	2008–09	A PFG	26	0	1	0	–		27	0
Slavia Sofia	2009–10	A PFG	19	0	2	0	–		21	0
Slavia Sofia	2010–11	A PFG	23	0	4	0	–		27	0
Slavia Sofia	2011–12	A PFG	12	0	0	0	–		12	0
Slavia Sofia	2012–13	A PFG	8	0	4	0	–		12	0
Slavia Sofia	Total		103	0	13	0	0	0	116	0
Career total			190	0	14	0	0	0	204	0

== Honours ==
Levski Sofia

- A PFG: 2005–06
