= Petar Atanasov (footballer) =

Bulgarian footballer

Personal information
- Full name: Petar Nikolaev Atanasov
- Date of birth: 13 October 1990 (age 36)
- Place of birth: Rakovski, Bulgaria
- Height: 1.75 m (5 ft 9 in)
- Positions: Attacking midfielder; forward

Team information
- Current team: Maritsa
- Number: 90

Youth career
- –2006: Rakovski
- 2006–2007: Lokomotiv Plovdiv

Senior career*
Years	Team	Apps	(Gls)
2007–2009	Lokomotiv Plovdiv	1	(0)
2009–2011	Brestnik 1948	49	(20)
2011–2014	Botev Plovdiv	35	(5)
2013	→ Rakovski (loan)	11	(5)
2013	→ Chernomorets (loan)	17	(2)
2014	Rakovski	27	(16)
2015–2016	Slavia Sofia	26	(4)
2016	→ Montana (loan)	14	(0)
2016–2017	Montana	46	(5)
2018–2021	Botev Vratsa	102	(23)
2021–2022	Tsarsko Selo	18	(0)
2022–	Maritsa	45	(4)

International career
2011–2012	Bulgaria U21	2	(0)
- * Club domestic league appearances and goals as of 5 June 2023

Petar Nikolaev Atanasov (Bulgarian: Петър Николаев Атанасов; born 13 October 1990) is a Bulgarian footballer who plays as a forward for Bulgarian Second League club Maritsa.

== Career ==
Atanasov's career began at the FC Rakovski. At the age of just 16, Petar was scouted by Lokomotiv Plovdiv and he joined their youth system. In the 2006–07 season he was promoted to the first team of Lokomotiv and on 4 May 2007 he made his A PFG debut in a 3–0 away loss against Belasitsa Petrich.
