= Angel Rahov =

Bulgarian footballer

Personal information
- Full name: Angel Stoyanov Rahov
- Date of birth: 1 July 1986 (age 40)
- Place of birth: Plovdiv, Bulgaria
- Height: 1.82 m (5 ft 11 1/2 in)
- Positions: Defender; defensive midfielder

Youth career
- 1997–2004: Spartak Plovdiv

Senior career*
Years	Team	Apps	(Gls)
2004–2007	Brestnik 1948	42	(1)
2007–2010	FC Eurocollege	101	(15)
2010–2014	Botev Plovdiv	65	(7)
2013–2014	→ Rakovski (loan)	25	(1)
2014	Montana	10	(0)
- * Club domestic league appearances and goals as of 1 December 2014

Angel Stoyanov Rahov (Bulgarian: Ангел Стоянов Рахов; born 1 July 1986) is a Bulgarian footballer who plays as a defender or defensive midfielder.

== Career ==
His career started in Spartak Plovdiv, where he spent seven years playing at youth level - from 1997 to 2004. Rahov then moved to Brestnik 1948 where he made 42 senior appearances and scored one goal for three seasons. His football career continued at FC Eurocollege for another three seasons. During that time Rahov made 101 senior appearances and scored 15 goals.

It was in 2010 when the big offer came, with Botev Plovdiv - one of the top Bulgarian football clubs coming to sign him. Rahov spent three seasons at Botev, playing 65 league matches and scoring 7 goals for the oldest Bulgarian football club.

Rahov was loaned out to Rakovski for season 2013/14.
