= Ivan Ploshtakov =

Bulgarian footballer

Personal information
- Full name: Ivan Marinov Ploshtakov
- Date of birth: 1 February 1986 (age 40)
- Place of birth: Plovdiv, Bulgaria
- Height: 1.89 m (6 ft 2 1/2 in)
- Position: Forward

Team information
- Current team: Maritsa Plovdiv
- Number: 10

Senior career*
Years	Team	Apps	(Gls)
2003–2004	Asenovets	33	(11)
2005	CSKA Sofia	4	(1)
2005–2006	Maritsa Plovdiv	35	(12)
2007	Rodopa Smolyan	11	(1)
2007–2009	Spartak Plovdiv	53	(9)
2009–2010	Chieti Calcio	1	(0)
2010–2011	Botev Plovdiv	15	(6)
2012	Pirin Gotse Delchev	6	(0)
2012–2013	Rakovski	11	(2)
2013	Balkan FT	?	(?)
2014–	Maritsa Plovdiv	0	(0)
- * Club domestic league appearances and goals as of 1 August 2014

Ivan Ploshtakov (Bulgarian: Иван Площаков; born 1 February 1986) is a Bulgarian footballer who plays as a forward for Maritsa Plovdiv.
