= Hristo Mitov =

Bulgarian footballer

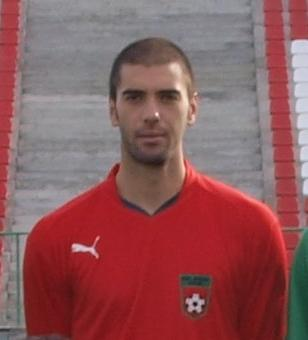

Personal information
- Full name: Hristo Ivanov Mitov
- Date of birth: 24 January 1985 (age 41)
- Place of birth: Vratsa, Bulgaria
- Height: 1.92 m (6 ft 3 1/2 in)
- Position: Goalkeeper

Team information
- Current team: CSKA Sofia (Goalkeeper Coach)

Youth career
- –2003: CSKA Sofia

Senior career*
Years	Team	Apps	(Gls)
2004–2006	Conegliano German	9	(0)
2006–2007	Lokomotiv Mezdra	16	(0)
2007–2008	Chavdar Etropole	9	(0)
2008–2021	Botev Vratsa	81	(0)
2021–2022	Sevlievo	2	(0)
2022–2023	Botev Vratsa II	?	(?)
2025	Kom Berkovitsa	?	(?)

Managerial career
- 2021–2024: Botev Vratsa II (Goalkeeper Coach)
- 2022: Botev Vratsa (Goalkeeper Coach)
- 2022–2025: Botev Vratsa (Goalkeeper Coach)
- 2025–: CSKA Sofia (Goalkeeper Coach)
- * Club domestic league appearances and goals

Hristo Ivanov Mitov (Bulgarian: Христо Митов; born 24 January 1985) is a Bulgarian footballer who currently plays for Bulgarian Third League club Sevlievo as a goalkeeper. He had previously played for Conegliano German, Lokomotiv Mezdra and Chavdar Etropole.
