= Mariyan Ognyanov =

Bulgarian footballer (born 1988)

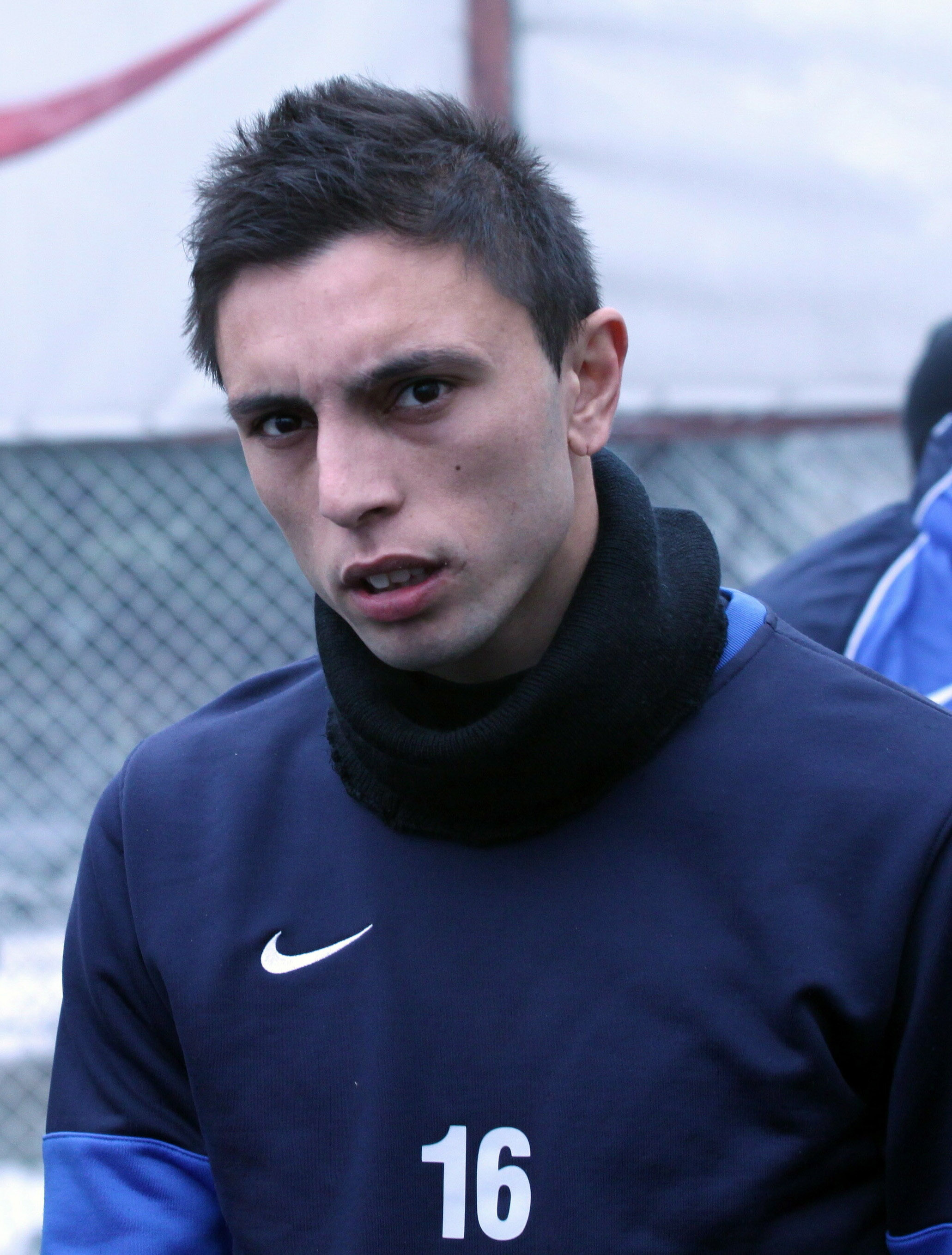
- Ognyanov in 2011

Personal information
- Full name: Mariyan Georgiev Ognyanov
- Date of birth: 30 July 1988 (age 38)
- Place of birth: Lom, Bulgaria
- Height: 1.82 m (6 ft 0 in)
- Position: Attacking midfielder

Team information
- Current team: Kom Berkovitsa
- Number: 9

Youth career
- Romiteli Lom
- 2000–2006: Levski Sofia

Senior career*
Years	Team	Apps	(Gls)
2004–2011	Levski Sofia	58	(5)
2009	→ Belasitsa Petrich (loan)	13	(3)
2012–2016	Botev Plovdiv	110	(11)
2016–2017	Neftochimic Burgas	19	(1)
2017–2018	Cherno More	25	(6)
2018–2019	CSKA 1948	19	(2)
2019–2020	Hansa Friesoythe	13	(10)
2020–2022	Levski Lom	36	(22)
2022	Spartak Pleven	15	(11)
2022–2023	Ellas Syrou 1929	24	(5)
2023–2024	Sevlievo	5	(1)
2025–	Kom Berkovitsa	0	(0)

International career
2008–2009	Bulgaria U21		
2013	Bulgaria	1	(0)
- * Club domestic league appearances and goals as of 6 July 2022

Mariyan Georgiev Ognyanov (Bulgarian: Мариян Георгиев Огнянов; born 30 July 1988) is a Bulgarian professional footballer who plays as a midfielder.

== Career ==
=== Levski Sofia ===
Ognyanov played for Levski Sofia from 2004. On 27 September 2006, Ognyanov scored the first goal by a Bulgarian team in the UEFA Champions League group stage during Levski Sofia's 1–3 defeat by Chelsea at home, and became the sixth youngest goalscorer in the Champions League at that point on 18 years and 58 days.

Until 2007–08, he played mainly as a substitute. After a large number of departures in the winter transfer window of the 2007–08 season, Ognyanov started to play often.

=== Belasitsa Petrich ===
He was loaned on 27 January 2009 to PFC Belasitsa Petrich. He played for Belasitsa until the end of 2008–09 season, scoring on 10 May 2009 against Lokomotiv Sf in a 4–2 home loss. At Belasitsa he played 14 times and scored 3 goals. After the end of 2008–09 season, Ognyanov returned to Levski Sofia.

=== Return to Levski Sofia ===
Ognyanov re-debuted for Levski on 21 July 2009 in the second match of the 2nd Qualifying round of UEFA Champions League, where Levski beat the team of UE Sant Julià. The result of the match was 0–5 with an away win for Levski. Ognyanov scored two of the goals in the 23rd and the 39th minute.

=== Botev Plovdiv ===
Mariyan Ognyanov joined Botev Plovdiv in the beginning of 2012. In his first three and a half seasons he played in 118 official games (86 - A Grupa, 10 - B Grupa, 11 - Bulgarian Cup, 10 - UEFA Europa League, 1 - Bulgarian Super Cup), scored 16 goals and made numerous assists.

==== 2011–12 ====
In January 2012, Ognyanov joined Botev Plovdiv and helped the team to get a promotion to A Grupa. He quickly established himself as a key player and took part in 10 games.

==== 2012–13 ====
Although Botev Plovdiv signed with a lot of new players Ognyanov remained a key player during season 2012–13. He participated in 28 matches in A Grupa and scored 6 goals. Botev Plovdiv finished the season on the 4th place.

==== 2013–14 ====
Botev Plovdiv was allowed to participate in the UEFA Europa League despite finishing on 4th place of A Grupa during the previous season because of the financial troubles at CSKA Sofia. Marian participated in all six games of the team in the tournament and demonstrated an excellent partnership on the field with Todor Nedelev. During the European campaign Ognyanov scored two goals in the home wins against FC Astana and HŠK Zrinjski Mostar.

On 5 December 2013, Ognyanov came on as a substitute and scored the winning goal for the 2–1 victory over CSKA Sofia].

Botev Plovdiv finished again on the 4th place of A Grupa and lost the final for the Bulgarian Cup. Despite the loss Botev Plovdiv qualified for UEFA Europa League. Ognyanov played in 5 games for the Bulgarian Cup and 27 games in A Grupa, primary as a defensive midfielder. He scored one goal in each home victories over Pirin Gotse Delchev and CSKA Sofia].

==== 2014–15 ====
Despite the financial crisis Ognyanov was among the few first team players who did not leave the club in the summer of 2014. He accepted a reduction of his salary and remained for season 2014–15.

Ognyanov scored twice against A.C. Libertas in the 4–0 home win in the first qualifying round of 2014–15 UEFA Europa League. He participated again in all four games of Botev Plovdiv in the UEFA Europa League and made three assists. With four goals Marian shares the third place in the list of top goalscorers for Botev Plovdiv in the European football tournaments.

On 23 September, Marian Ognyanov scored the second goal for the 0–4 away win against Lokomotiv Mezdra in the first round of the Bulgarian Cup tournament. In the next round of the Bulgarian Cup Marian assisted for the late equalizer of Aleksandar Kolev against Lokomotiv Plovdiv.

Marian Ognyanov scored his first goal of the season in A Grupa from a free kick on 2 November. Unfortunately his goal was not enough and the team of Botev Plovdiv was defeated with 2–1.

As of 26 November 2014, Mariyan Ognyanov was the player with most assists during the season so far in Bulgaria. He assisted for 6 goals in A Grupa as well as for 4 goals in other official tournaments.

Ognyanov started 2015 with a fabulous goal and an assist for the 3–0 home win over PFC Marek Dupnitsa. On 10 March Mariyan was again among the best players on the pitch in the next round of A Grupa. Ognyanov prove his creativity and passing abilities and was involved in both goals for the 0–2 away win in the derby match against the local rivals Lokomotiv Plovdiv. Ognyanov missed the game with CSKA Sofia] due to a ban, and on 22 March he was again in the starting lineup for 0–0 draw with Ludogorets Razgrad. On 18 April, Ognyanov scored a goal for the 1–1 draw with Beroe Stara Zagora.

The contract of Mariyan Ognyanov with Botev Plovdiv expired at the end of the season and he left the team. In an interview Ognyanov stated that he is grateful for everything and he hopes one day to play again for Botev Plovdiv. On 17 June, Mariyan joined the Romanian professional football club Târgu Mureș on a free transfer, but he left a week later for personal reasons and returned to Botev Plovdiv.

==== 2015–16 ====
Ognyanov started his 5th season at Botev Plovdiv with a game against his ex-team Levski Sofia in the first round of A Grupa. He missed a penalty and the game ended in a 1–1 tie. After the game Mariyan Ognyanov apologized to Botev Plovdiv supporters.

Ognyanov missed the second round in A Grupa and returned in the starting lineup for the 1–1 draw against the local rivals Lokomotiv Plovdiv. He was the captain of the team due to the absence of Yordan Hristov who received a red card in the previous match. Ognyanov made a brilliant assist for the goal scored by Aleksandar Kolev.

On 22 November, Ognyanov made the assist for the winning goal scored by Nico Varela during the away game against Cherno More Varna. A week later, on 29 November, Ognyanov provided the assist for the second goal of Gregory Nelson during the 4–2 away defeat from Litex Lovech.

On 7 April 2016, Botev Plovdiv announced that the expiring contracts of Ognyanov and the goalkeeper Valentin Galev will not be renewed for the next season. A week later Nikolay Kostov, the head coach and manager of Botev Plovdiv at that time, explained that he expected better performance and more engagement to the development of the younger players from Mariyan. On 18 April, the contacts of Ognyanov and Galev were terminated on mutual agreements. On 19 April Ognyanov received a medal of honor and special t-shirt to celebrate his 133 appearances in official games for Botev Plovdiv.

Mariyan Ognyanov spent almost 5 seasons in Botev Plovdiv. He played in 100 games in A Grupa, 10 in B Grupa, 12 for the Bulgarian Cup, 1 for the Bulgarian Supercup and 10 games in UEFA Europa League.

=== Cherno More ===
On 14 June 2017, Ognyanov joined Cherno More. On 15 July, he made his debut in a 1–0 home win over Vitosha Bistritsa. On 21 July, he scored a brace in a 4–0 away win over Vereya which earned him the Man of the match award.

== International career ==
Ognyanov made his debut for Bulgaria on 15 August 2013, after coming on as a substitute during the 0–2 defeat from Macedonia in a friendly match.

== Career statistics ==
As of 30 July 2018

Appearances and goals by club, season and competition
Club	Season	League			National cup (Note: Includes Bulgarian Cup.)		Continental		Other		Total	
Club	Season	Division	Apps	Goals	Apps	Goals	Apps	Goals	Apps	Goals	Apps	Goals
Levski Sofia	2004–05	A Group	4	2	1	0	0	0	–		5	2
Levski Sofia	2005–06	A Group	3	0	0	0	0	0	0	0	3	0
Levski Sofia	2006–07	A Group	5	0	0	0	2	1	0	0	7	1
Levski Sofia	2007–08	A Group	11	1	0	0	0	0	0	0	11	1
Levski Sofia	2008–09	A Group	1	0	0	0	0	0	0	0	1	0
Levski Sofia	2009–10	A Group	7	0	0	0	2	2	0	0	9	2
Levski Sofia	2010–11	A Group	22	2	3	0	8	0	–		33	2
Levski Sofia	2011–12	A Group	5	0	0	0	0	0	–		5	0
Levski Sofia	Total		58	5	4	0	12	3	0	0	74	8
Belasitsa Petrich (loan)	2008–09	A Group	13	3	0	0	0	0	–		13	3
Botev Plovdiv	2011–12	B Group	10	0	–		–		–		10	0
Botev Plovdiv	2012–13	A Group	28	6	4	0	–		–		32	6
Botev Plovdiv	2013–14	A Group	27	2	4	0	6	2	–		37	4
Botev Plovdiv	2014–15	A Group	31	3	3	0	4	2	1 (Note: Appearances in Bulgarian Supercup)	0	39	5
Botev Plovdiv	2015–16	A Group	14	0	1	0	–		–		15	0
Botev Plovdiv	Total		110	11	12	0	10	4	1	0	143	15
Neftochimic Burgas	2016–17	Bulgarian First League	19	1	1	0	–		4 (Note: Appearances in Relegation play-offs)	1	24	2
Cherno More	2017–18	Bulgarian First League	24	6	1	0	–		–		25	6
Cherno More	2018–19	Bulgarian First League	1	0	0	0	–		–		1	0
Cherno More	Total		25	6	1	0	0	0	0	0	26	6
Career total			225	26	18	0	22	7	5	1	270	34

== Honours ==
Levski Sofia

- A Group: 2006, 2007, 2009
- Bulgarian Cup: 2005, 2007
- Bulgarian Supercup: 2005, 2007, 2009

Botev Plovdiv

- Bulgarian Cup runner-up: 2014
- Bulgarian Supercup runner-up: 2014
