= Asen Karaslavov =

Bulgarian footballer

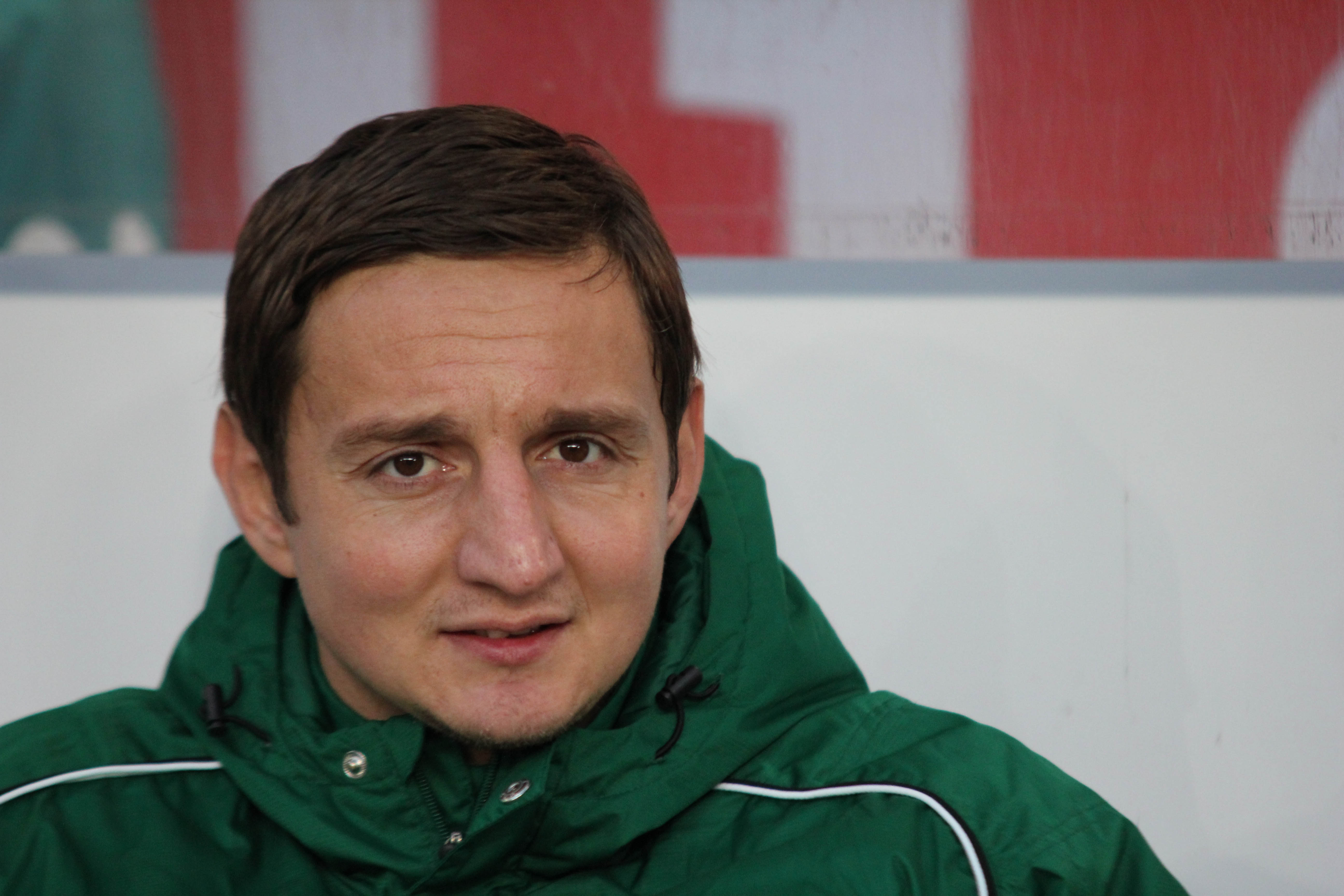

Personal information
- Full name: Asen Dimitrov Karaslavov
- Date of birth: 8 June 1980 (age 46)
- Place of birth: Asenovgrad, Bulgaria
- Height: 1.86 m (6 ft 1 in)
- Position: Centre-back

Youth career
- 1988–1994: Asenovets
- 1994–1998: Botev Plovdiv

Senior career*
Years	Team	Apps	(Gls)
1999–2001	Botev Plovdiv	27	(2)
2001–2007	Slavia Sofia	137	(5)
2007–2012	Greuther Fürth	90	(4)
2012–2013	Botev Plovdiv	10	(0)
Total		264	(11)

International career
2004–2008	Bulgaria	10	(0)

Managerial career
- 2013–: Botev Plovdiv (director of football)
- * Club domestic league appearances and goals as of 14:20, 1 June 2013 (UTC)

Asen Dimitrov Karaslavov (Bulgarian: Асен Димитров Караславов; born 8 June 1980) is a Bulgarian former professional footballer who played as a centre-back. He is currently serving as the director of football at PFC Botev Plovdiv.

== Career ==
=== Botev Plovdiv ===
Karaslavov began his football career with Asenovets before being scouted by Botev Plovdiv in 1994. He was promoted to Botev's first team during the winter break of the 1999–2000 season, in January 2000. Karaslavov made his professional debut on 5 April 2000 in a Bulgarian Cup match against Neftochimic Burgas, coming on as a substitute for Kostadin Vidolov. He made his A Group (now First Professional Football League) debut on 20 May 2000 in a 1–0 home loss to Chernomorets Burgas, and went on to make five more appearances that season.

In the 2000–01 season, Karaslavov established himself as a regular starter under managers Marin Bakalov, Dimitar Mladenov, and Dinko Dermendzhiev. He scored his first A Group goal for Botev Plovdiv on 5 August 2000 in a 3–1 home victory over Hebar Pazardzhik. Over the course of the season, he made 22 league appearances and scored two goals.

=== Slavia Sofia ===
In 2001, Karaslavov signed a three-year contract with Slavia Sofia. He made his debut for the club on 3 August 2001 in a 1–0 away victory against Cherno More Varna. In 2006, following the transfer of Dimitar Rangelov, Karaslavov was appointed team captain—a role he held until his departure from the club in 2007.

=== Greuther Fürth ===
In 2007, Karaslavov transferred to SpVgg Greuther Fürth.

=== Botev Plovdiv ===
On 19 June 2012, Karaslavov re-signed for Botev Plovdiv on a 2+1 year contract. On the eve of the 2012–13 season, he was named captain of the team. Karaslavov made his second debut for Botev in a 3–0 win against Slavia Sofia on 11 August. He retired at the end of the season due to persistent injuries and subsequently became the club's director of football.
