= Marlon Pereira Freire =

Aruban footballer (born 1987)

Marlon Pereira
Personal information
- Full name: Marlon Pereira Freire
- Date of birth: 26 March 1987 (age 39)
- Place of birth: Rotterdam, Netherlands
- Height: 1.78 m (5 ft 10 in)
- Position: Full-back

Youth career
- Sparta AV
- Steeds Hooger
- Noorderkwartier
- VUC Den Haag

Senior career*
Years	Team	Apps	(Gls)
2009–2012	Willem II	81	(1)
2013	Botev Plovdiv	9	(0)
2013–2016	Cambuur	37	(0)
2016–2018	Beerschot	14	(1)
2018	Jong Sparta	9	(0)
2018–2021	SteDoCo	41	(5)
Total		191	(7)

International career
2018–2021	Aruba	11	(0)
- * Club domestic league appearances and goals

Marlon Pereira Freire (born 26 March 1987) is an Aruban former professional footballer who played as a full-back. Born in the Netherlands, Pereira represented the Aruba national football team. After retiring from professional football, he played in the lower tiers for SteDoCo and Hooger.

== Career ==
Pereira started his career with amateur clubs Sparta AV, Steeds Hooger and Noorderkwartier. Then he was scouted to play for the VUC talent pool, which educates young players to play for professional football clubs. In January 2008 he signed a three-year deal with Willem II. Initially, he mainly appeared for the reserves, however, on the first matchday of the 2009–10 Eredivisie against Vitesse, he made his professional debut, starting in a 3–1 victory.

== International career ==
Pereira made his professional debut for the Aruba national football team in a 0–0 2019–20 CONCACAF Nations League qualifying draw against Guadeloupe on 16 October 2018.

== After football ==
Pereira has played at an amateur level in the lower tiers of Dutch football since 2022, representing Steeds Hooger competing in the ninth-tier Vierde Klasse.
