= Rangel Abushev =

Bulgarian footballer

Personal information
- Full name: Rangel Minkov Abushev
- Date of birth: 26 May 1989 (age 37)
- Place of birth: Plovdiv, Bulgaria
- Height: 1.80 m (5 ft 11 in)
- Positions: Winger; forward

Youth career
- Lokomotiv Plovdiv
- Maritsa Plovdiv

Senior career*
Years	Team	Apps	(Gls)
2007–2009	Maritsa Plovdiv	39	(12)
2009	Vihren Sandanski	13	(3)
2009–2011	Lokomotiv Plovdiv	11	(1)
2011–2012	Beroe Stara Zagora	19	(0)
2012–2013	Lokomotiv Plovdiv	28	(8)
2013	CSKA Sofia	3	(0)
2014	Slavia Sofia	9	(0)
2014	Enosis Neon Paralimni	12	(2)
2015	Marek Dupnitsa	8	(1)
2015–2016	Sibir Novosibirsk	7	(2)
2017	Spartak Pleven	8	(1)
2017	Minyor Pernik	10	(5)
2018–2019	Botev Galabovo	25	(10)
2019–2020	Spartak Varna	9	(0)
2020–2021	Levski Lom		
2021	Dobrudzha	15	(3)
- * Club domestic league appearances and goals as of 19:42, 14 January 2022 (UTC)

Rangel Minkov Abushev (Bulgarian: Рангел Минков Абушев; born 26 May 1989) is a Bulgarian footballer who plays as a forward.

== Career ==
In September 2016, Abushev joined Spartak Pleven but due to registration problems following contract disputes with his former club Sibir Novosibirsk he was unable to play. He signed officially on 21 February 2017. In August 2021 Abushev joined Dobrudzha Dobrich.
