= Ivaylo Dimitrov (footballer, born 1987) =

Bulgarian former footballer

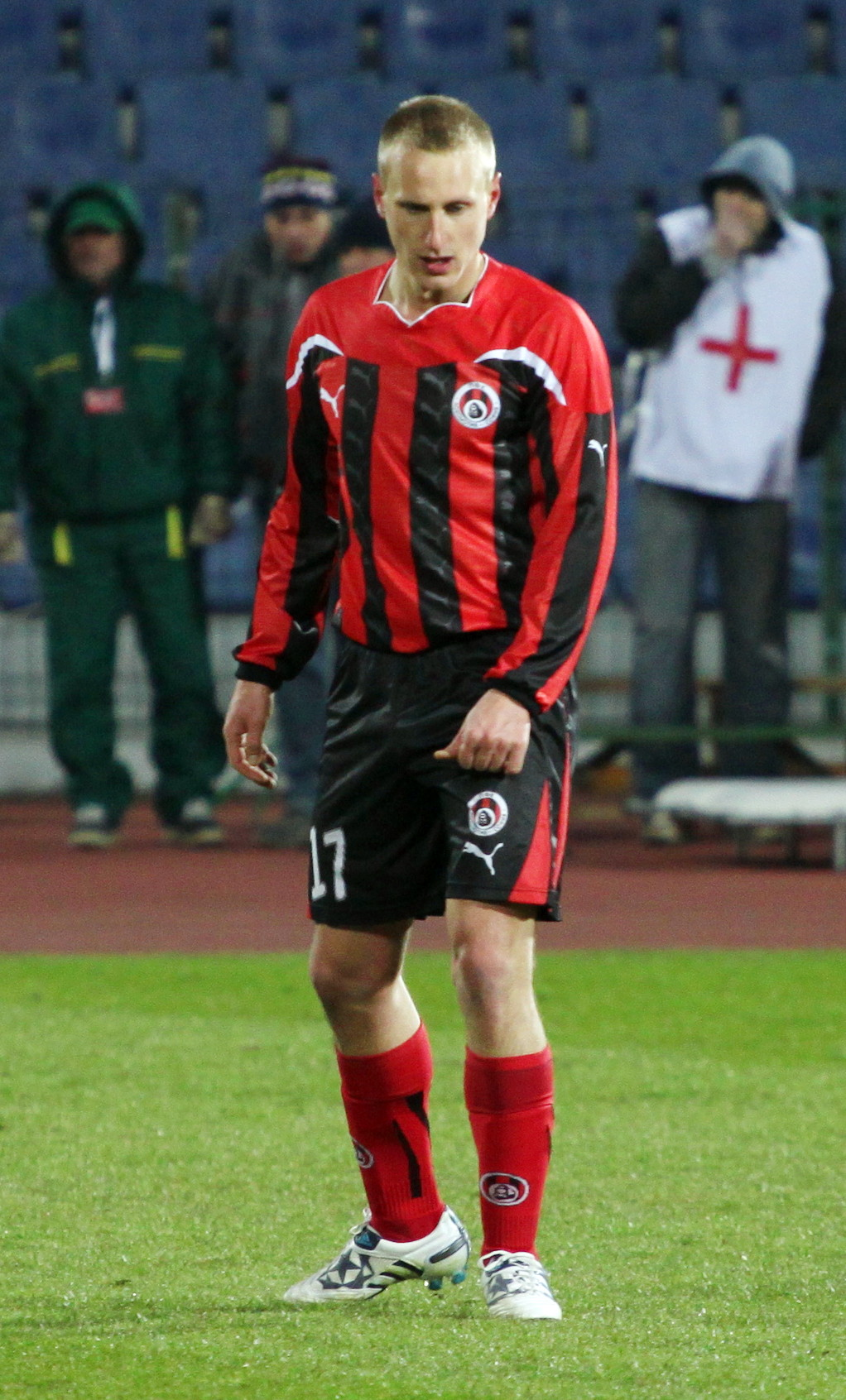

Personal information
- Full name: Ivaylo Georgiev Dimitrov
- Date of birth: 26 June 1987 (age 39)
- Place of birth: Plovdiv, Bulgaria
- Height: 1.71 m (5 ft 7 in)
- Positions: Right back; right wing back

Youth career
- Spartak Plovdiv

Senior career*
Years	Team	Apps	(Gls)
2006–2007	Spartak Plovdiv	22	(2)
2007–2011	Lokomotiv Sofia	46	(0)
2008	→ Spartak Plovdiv (loan)	10	(0)
2011–2012	Botev Plovdiv	26	(0)
2013–2014	Lokomotiv Plovdiv	9	(0)
2015	Chernomorets Burgas	5	(0)
2015–2016	Oborishte	28	(0)
Total		146	(2)
- * Club domestic league appearances and goals as of 1 June 2016

Ivaylo Dimitrov (Bulgarian: Ивайло Димитров; born 26 June 1987 in Plovdiv) is a Bulgarian former footballer who played as a right back.

== Career ==
Born in Plovdiv, Dimitrov started to play football in local club Spartak. In June 2006, he signed first professional contract with the club. After one very good season with Spartak in Bulgarian second division Dimitrov signed with Lokomotiv Sofia. He established himself as a regular for the team during the 2010–11 season.

In January 2017 Dimitrov announced his retirement from football.
