= Ivan Tsvetkov =

Bulgarian footballer (born 1979)

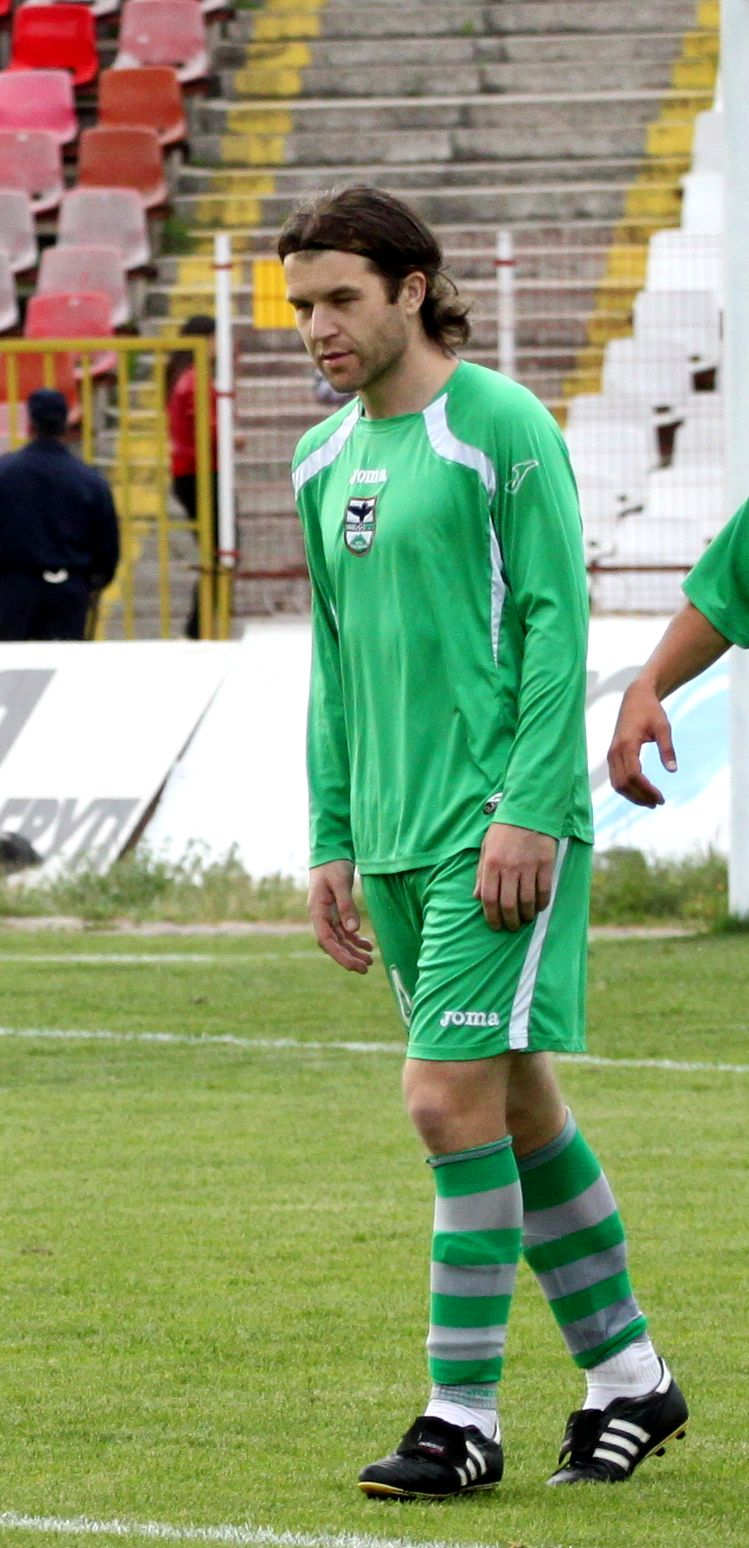
- Tsvetkov playing for Pirin in 2011

Personal information
- Full name: Ivan Petrov Tsvetkov
- Date of birth: 31 August 1979 (age 47)
- Place of birth: Blagoevgrad, Bulgaria
- Height: 1.79 m (5 ft 10 in)
- Positions: Second striker; striker

Youth career
- 1987–1997: Pirin Blagoevgrad
- 1997–1998: SC Heerenveen

Senior career*
Years	Team	Apps	(Gls)
1998–2000	Heerenveen	16	(2)
2000–2002	Veendam	66	(40)
2002–2004	Zwolle	41	(1)
2004–2005	Helmond Sport	32	(19)
2005–2007	Sparta Rotterdam	41	(8)
2007–2008	Sivasspor	41	(11)
2008–2010	Khazar Lankaran	50	(22)
2011	Pirin Blagoevgrad	13	(8)
2011–2012	Levski Sofia	30	(11)
2012–2015	Botev Plovdiv	77	(28)
2017	Pirin Blagoevgrad	14	(6)

International career
2012	Bulgaria	1	(0)

Managerial career
- 2017–2018: Pirin Blagoevgrad (assistant)
- 2018–: Ludogorets Razgrad (scout)
- * Club domestic league appearances and goals

Ivan Tsvetkov (Bulgarian: Иван Цветков; born 31 August 1979) is a Bulgarian former professional footballer who played as a forward. He works as an assistant manager and is employed as a scout for Ludogorets Razgrad.

== Club career ==
Born in Blagoevgrad, Tsvetkov took up football with local side Pirin. At the age of 18, he joined Dutch SC Heerenveen's youth academy. In 1998 Tsvetkov started his senior career and during his two seasons at Abe Lenstra Stadion, he scored 2 goals in 16 matches.

In summer of 2000, Tsvetkov joined BV Veendam. After 18 goals in his first season, he was named as the Eerste Divisie top scorer at the close of the following 2001–02 season with a total of 22 goals in the league.

In July 2002, Tsvetkov transferred to Zwolle after Veendam accepted an undisclosed bid. He spent two years at Zwolle, where he capped 41 times and scored 1 goal, before moved to Helmond Sport.

In January 2007 after making 41 appearances for Sparta Rotterdam, Tsvetkov was transferred to Turkish side Sivasspor. He scored his first Süper Lig hat-trick on 30 March 2007, scoring four in a 4–0 win over Kasımpaşa.

On 27 August 2008, Tsvetkov signed for Azerbaijani club Khazar Lankaran. During that season, Ivan became a topscorer of his team, scoring 15 goals, and the second best goalscorer of the league.

=== Return to Pirin ===
On 4 March 2011, Tsvetkov returned to Bulgaria and signed for Pirin Blagoevgrad on a rolling contract until the end of the season. On 2 April, in a 3–0 home victory over Montana, he netted his first goal in an A PFG match and assisted Krum Bibishkov and Anton Karachanakov. Four days later Tsvetkov scored his first Bulgarian Cup goal as he netted the first in a 2–1 away victory over Lokomotiv Plovdiv. He continued his goal scoring form on 30 April, scoring the opening goal in the 2–0 home win over Beroe. On 4 May Ivan scored twice in a 3–2 home defeat to Levski Sofia. Tsvetkov's 5th Pirin league goal came during a 2–2 away draw against Lokomotiv Plovdiv on 7 May. On 14 May, he scored the fifth goal of a 6–0 home victory over Akademik Sofia. Four days later, Tsvetkov scored Pirin's second in a 2–2 away draw against CSKA Sofia. On 21 May, he netted from a free-kick in a 1–1 home draw against Chernomorets Burgas, securing Pirin's place in the top flight for the next season.

=== Levski Sofia ===
In June 2011, Tsvetkov signed for Levski Sofia. On 2 July, he made his unofficial debut and netted the only goal in the 1–0 win against Lokomotiv Sofia in an exhibition match, which marked the end of former Bulgarian international Georgi Markov's professional football career. His official debut for Levski came on 28 July 2011 – he played the full 90 minutes in the 2–1 win over Slovak side Spartak Trnava in a UEFA Europa League match. On 8 August 2011, in his first A PFG match for Levski, he scored the only goal in the 1–0 win against Slavia Sofia. On 28 October 2011, Tsvetkov made his first appearance in The Eternal Derby of Bulgaria, coming on as a late substitute in the 0–1 loss against CSKA Sofia. On 23 November 2011, he scored the only goal for Levski in the 1–0 win over FC Bansko in a 2011–12 Bulgarian Cup match. Tsvetkov netted his first hat-trick for Levski in the 7–0 rout over Svetkavitsa on 23 May 2012.

=== Botev Plovdiv ===
In June 2012, Tsvetkov signed a two-year contract with newly promoted A Group side Botev Plovdiv.

==== 2012–13 season ====
In his debut for Botev on 11 August 2012, Tsvetkov scored a hattrick and missed a penalty kick to help his team to a 3–0 home win over Slavia Sofia. On 9 March 2013, he scored the second goal for Botev in the 2–0 milestone home win (the first one in 16 years) over Levski Sofia. Tsvetkov has since become the team's captain and ended his first season as the second highest goalscorer with 17 goals.

==== 2013–14 ====
In May 2013, Tsvetkov sustained an injury which kept him out of action for 5 months. He spent most of the time during this season on the bench and finished it with only three goals in the league.

On 12 October 2013, Tsvetkov marked his return with a goal in the 3–0 win over Neftochimic Burgas in a Bulgarian Cup match. On 16 March 2014, he scored the winning goal in the 2–1 victory over Lokomotiv Plovdiv. Tsvetkov came as a substitute and four minutes later scored the second goal for the 2–0 win against Levski Sofia on 26 April 2014.

==== 2014–15 ====
Tsvetkov has among the few players which agreed to reduce their wages and remained at the club for season 2014–15 despite the financial crisis. He scored his first goal for the club in Europa League against A.C. Libertas. Botev Plovdiv won the game with 4–0. Tsvetkov scored again in the same competition during the 2–1 home win against the Austrian team SKN St. Pölten.

On 27 June, Tsvetkov scored a late equalizer in the away game against Beroe Stara Zagora. Two weeks later, on 9 August, he scored the opening goal in the dramatic 3–3 draw against Litex Lovech. His excellent performance continued on 30 August 2014 during the 7th round of A Group when he scored a goal and made an assist during the second half of the game with Haskovo.

On 12 September, Tsvetkov was brought on as a substitute in the match against Ludogorets Razgrad and scored his 4th goal for the season from a penalty kick. Despite his good performance, Botev was defeated 2–1. The excellent performance of Tsvetkov this season continued in the first round of the Bulgarian Cup. On 23 September, he scored the opening goal in the away game against Lokomotiv Mezdra which was won by Botev Plovdiv with final score 0–4. On 27 September, Tsvetkov played his 100th match in the league and scored a goal for the 2–0 win over the local rivals Lokomotiv Plovdiv. He scored his seventh goal for the season in the league on 24 October during the 3–1 win over Beroe. the first one in seven years. On 3 December, Tsvetkov scored another goal for the Bulgarian Cup tournament during the derby match against Lokomotiv Plovdiv. Despite his efforts Botev was dramatically defeated with two goals in the last six minutes of the game.

On 16 May, Tsvetkov performed extremely well during the 3–2 victory over CSKA Sofia. He provided an assist to Lachezar Baltanov for the second goal and scored the third goal for Botev. Tsvetkov received the award for man of the match. He was named the second-place winner of the best player in A Group for the 2014–15 season. Tsvetkov announced his retirement at the end of the campaign.

== International career ==
Tsvetkov was part of the Bulgaria U21 roster for one game.

In November 2012, Tsvetkov was called up to the Bulgaria national team by head coach Lyuboslav Penev for a friendly match against Ukraine. He earned his only cap on 14 November, playing 27 minutes in the 0–1 defeat against the Ukrainians.

== Coaching career ==
=== Pirin Blagoevgrad ===
In January 2017, Tsvetkov returned to Pirin Blagoevgrad as player and assistant to manager Milen Radukanov.

== Personal life ==
Tsvetkov also holds Dutch citizenship. In 2003, he had to give up his Bulgarian nationality in order to acquire a Dutch passport, but in November 2012 Tsvetkov reclaimed his Bulgarian citizenship.

== Honours ==
SC Heerenveen

- Eredivisie runner-up: 1999–2000

Botev Plovdiv

- Bulgarian Cup runner-up: 2014
- Bulgarian Supercup runner-up: 2014

Individual

- Botev Plovdiv player of the year: 2014
- City of Plovdiv player of the year: 2014
- A Grupa best player runner-up: 2014–15
