= 2012–13 A Group =

89th season of top-tier football league in Bulgaria

A Group
- Season: 2012–13
- Dates: 11 August 2012 – 25 May 2013
- Champions: Ludogorets Razgrad (2nd title)
- Relegated: Botev Vratsa; Minyor Pernik; Etar 1924; Montana
- Champions League: Ludogorets Razgrad
- Europa League: Levski Sofia; Botev; Beroe
- Matches: 240
- Goals: 600 (2.5 per match)
- Top goalscorer: (Guinea-Bissau) Basile de Carvalho (19 goals)
- Biggest home win: Levski 7–1 Etar 1924
- Biggest away win: Pirin 0–5 CSKA Sofia
- Highest scoring: Levski 7–1 Etar 1924

The 2012–13 A Group was the 89th season of the Bulgarian national top football division, and the 65th of A Group as the top-tier football league in the country. The season began on 11 August 2012 and ended with the last games on 25 May 2013. Ludogorets Razgrad won the A Group title for a second consecutive season, after Levski were leading prior to the last round match, but made a draw with Slavia.

== Teams ==
Vidima-Rakovski, Kaliakra and Svetkavitsa were relegated after finishing in the bottom three places of the table at the end of season 2011–12. Vidima and Kaliakra return to the second tier after two-year spells in the elite, while Svetkavitsa return after just one season in the top tier.

The relegated teams were replaced by Pirin (Gotse Delchev), champions of West B Group, Etar 1924 (Veliko Tarnovo), champions of East B Group and promotion play-off winners Botev (Plovdiv). Botev returned to A Group after two years of absence, Pirin made their debut on the highest level of Bulgarian football, while Etar 1924 made its debut in the top level, although it’s unofficial predecessor, Etar Veliko Tarnovo played in the top level 14 years ago, season 1997–98.

=== Stadia and locations ===
As in the previous year, the league comprised the best thirteen teams of season 2011–12, the champions of the two B Groups and the winners of the promotion play-offs.

Note: Table lists in alphabetical order.

Location of teams in 2012–13 A Group
Sofia 2012–13 A Group football clubs

| Team | Location | Stadium | Capacity |
|---|---|---|---|
| Beroe | Stara Zagora | Beroe | 12,300 |
| Botev | Plovdiv | Hristo Botev | 18,000 |
| Botev | Vratsa | Hristo Botev | 32,000 |
| Cherno More | Varna | Ticha | 8,250 |
| Chernomorets | Burgas | Lazur | 18,037 |
| CSKA | Sofia | Balgarska Armiya | 22,015 |
| Etar 1924 | Veliko Tarnovo | Ivaylo | 18,000 |
| Levski | Sofia | Georgi Asparuhov | 19,200 |
| Litex | Lovech | Lovech | 8,100 |
| Lokomotiv | Plovdiv | Lokomotiv | 10,000 |
| Lokomotiv | Sofia | Lokomotiv | 22,000 |
| Ludogorets | Razgrad | Ludogorets Arena | 6,000 |
| Minyor | Pernik | Minyor | 8,000 |
| Montana | Montana | Ogosta | 8,000 |
| Pirin | Gotse Delchev | Gradski | 5,000 |
| Slavia | Sofia | Ovcha Kupel | 15,992 |

=== Personnel and sponsoring ===
Note: Flags indicate national team as has been defined under FIFA eligibility rules. Players and Managers may hold more than one non-FIFA nationality.

| Team | Manager | Captain | Kit manufacturer | Shirt sponsor |
|---|---|---|---|---|
| Beroe Stara Zagora | (Bulgaria) Petar Hubchev | (Bulgaria) Doncho Atanasov | Uhlsport | Bulsatcom |
| Botev Plovdiv | (Bulgaria) Stanimir Stoilov | (Bulgaria) Asen Karaslavov | adidas | KTB AD |
| Botev Vratsa | (Bulgaria) Antoni Zdravkov | (Bulgaria) Iliya Iliev | Zeus | — |
| Cherno More Varna | (Bulgaria) Georgi Ivanov | (Bulgaria) Georgi Iliev | Misho | Armeets |
| Chernomorets Burgas | (Bulgaria) Dimitar Dimitrov | (Bulgaria) Trayan Dyankov | Legea | — |
| CSKA Sofia | (Bulgaria) Milen Radukanov | (Bulgaria) Ivan Bandalovski | Legea | GLOBUL |
| Etar | (Turkey) Serdar Dayat | (Bulgaria) Dormushali Saidhodzha | Jumper | CBA |
| Levski Sofia | (Bulgaria) Nikolay Mitov | (Bulgaria) Stanislav Angelov | Puma | VTB Bank, M-tel |
| Litex Lovech | (Bulgaria) Hristo Stoichkov | (Serbia) Nebojša Jelenković | adidas | b-connect |
| Lokomotiv Plovdiv | (Bulgaria) Stefan Genov | (Bulgaria) Zdravko Lazarov | Uhlsport | — |
| Lokomotiv Sofia | (Bulgaria) Emil Velev | (Bulgaria) Kristian Dobrev | Joma | MALIZIA, Casa Boyana |
| Ludogorets Razgrad | (Bulgaria) Ivaylo Petev | (Bulgaria) Emil Gargorov | adidas | Navibulgar |
| Minyor Pernik | (Bulgaria) Nikolay Todorov | (Bulgaria) Ivaylo Tsvetkov | Jumper | Municipal Insurance Company |
| Montana | (Bulgaria) Stoycho Stoev | (Bulgaria) Georgi Mechedzhiev | Jako | Ogosta Icecream |
| Pirin | (Bulgaria) Tencho Tenev | (Bulgaria) Petar Lazarov | Tinger | — |
| Slavia Sofia | (Bulgaria) Velislav Vutsov | (Bulgaria) Bogomil Dyakov | Joma | — |

== League table ==
| Pos | Team | Pld | W | D | L | GF | GA | GD | Pts | Qualification or relegation |
|---|---|---|---|---|---|---|---|---|---|---|
| 1 | Ludogorets Razgrad (C) | 30 | 22 | 6 | 2 | 58 | 13 | +45 | 72 | Qualification for Champions League second qualifying round |
| 2 | Levski Sofia | 30 | 22 | 5 | 3 | 59 | 20 | +39 | 71 | Qualification for Europa League first qualifying round |
| 3 | CSKA Sofia | 30 | 19 | 6 | 5 | 54 | 20 | +34 | 63 | Excluded from European competitions (Note: PFC CSKA Sofia were excluded from European competitions due to debts.) |
| 4 | Botev Plovdiv | 30 | 18 | 6 | 6 | 51 | 21 | +30 | 60 | Qualification for Europa League first qualifying round |
| 5 | Litex Lovech | 30 | 15 | 5 | 10 | 56 | 24 | +32 | 50 | |
| 6 | Chernomorets Burgas | 30 | 14 | 5 | 11 | 32 | 28 | +4 | 47 | |
| 7 | Beroe | 30 | 13 | 6 | 11 | 36 | 38 | −2 | 45 | Qualification for Europa League second qualifying round (Note: Beroe Stara Zagora qualified for the 2013–14 UEFA Europa League second qualifying round by winning the 2012–13 Bulgarian Cup.) |
| 8 | Slavia Sofia | 30 | 12 | 6 | 12 | 39 | 35 | +4 | 42 | |
| 9 | Lokomotiv Plovdiv | 30 | 10 | 9 | 11 | 37 | 34 | +3 | 39 | |
| 10 | Cherno More | 30 | 9 | 8 | 13 | 33 | 39 | −6 | 35 | |
| 11 | Pirin Gotse Delchev | 30 | 10 | 4 | 16 | 27 | 57 | −30 | 34 | |
| 12 | Lokomotiv Sofia | 30 | 7 | 10 | 13 | 27 | 38 | −11 | 31 (Note: Lokomotiv Sofia ahead of Botev Vratsa on head-to-head record; Lokomotiv Sofia–Botev Vratsa 3–0, Botev Vratsa–Lokomotiv Sofia 0–0.) | |
| 13 | Botev Vratsa (R) | 30 | 8 | 7 | 15 | 23 | 51 | −28 | 31 | Relegation to 2013–14 B Group |
| 14 | Minyor Pernik (R) | 30 | 5 | 5 | 20 | 20 | 49 | −29 | 20 | Relegation to 2013–14 B Group |
| 15 | Montana (R) | 30 | 4 | 4 | 22 | 27 | 57 | −30 | 16 | Relegation to 2013–14 B Group |
| 16 | Etar (R) | 30 | 4 | 4 | 22 | 20 | 75 | −55 | 16 | Relegation to 2013–14 B Group |

Source: A PFG (in Bulgarian)
Rules for classification: 1st points; 2nd head-to-head points; 3rd head-to-head goal difference; 4th head-to-head goals scored; 5th head-to-head away goals scored; 6th goal difference; 7th goals scored
(C) Champions; (R) Relegated

== Results ==
| Home \ Away | BSZ | BOT | BVR | CHM | CHB | CSK | ETA | LEV | LIT | LPL | LSO | LUD | MIN | MON | PGD | SLA |
|---|---|---|---|---|---|---|---|---|---|---|---|---|---|---|---|---|
| Beroe | | 2–1 | 4–0 | 1–0 | 0–1 | 0–1 | 1–0 | 1–2 | 1–0 | 1–2 | 1–1 | 0–0 | 1–0 | 2–2 | 2–3 | 2–1 |
| Botev Plovdiv | 1–2 | | 5–0 | 3–1 | 2–0 | 1–1 | 3–0 | 2–0 | 1–0 | 0–0 | 2–0 | 0–1 | 2–0 | 3–1 | 5–0 | 3–0 |
| Botev Vratsa | 0–0 | 0–0 | | 1–0 | 0–2 | 3–4 | 2–1 | 1–3 | 0–4 | 1–0 | 0–0 | 1–1 | 0–0 | 3–1 | 1–2 | 1–0 |
| Cherno More | 2–1 | 0–0 | 1–1 | | 1–1 | 0–0 | 0–1 | 1–1 | 1–0 | 3–0 | 2–0 | 0–3 | 2–0 | 2–1 | 5–1 | 0–0 |
| Chernomorets Burgas | 0–1 | 1–2 | 2–1 | 3–3 | | 1–1 | 2–1 | 0–2 | 0–0 | 1–1 | 3–1 | 1–0 | 2–0 | 1–0 | 1–0 | 2–0 |
| CSKA Sofia | 2–0 | 1–0 | 3–0 | 3–2 | 2–0 | | 3–1 | 1–0 | 0–2 | 0–0 | 1–1 | 0–0 | 3–0 | 1–0 | 3–0 | 2–1 |
| Etar | 0–2 | 1–2 | 1–0 | 0–1 | 0–3 | 0–4 | | 0–3 | 0–4 | 1–1 | 2–2 | 1–5 | 0–3 | 2–1 | 0–1 | 1–1 |
| Levski Sofia | 2–0 | 3–1 | 2–0 | 4–0 | 1–0 | 2–1 | 7–1 | | 2–1 | 2–1 | 2–1 | 1–0 | 2–1 | 0–0 | 2–0 | 1–1 |
| Litex Lovech | 1–2 | 0–1 | 5–1 | 4–1 | 1–0 | 1–0 | 6–1 | 1–2 | | 2–2 | 1–2 | 0–2 | 0–0 | 2–0 | 5–0 | 5–0 |
| Lokomotiv Plovdiv | 1–2 | 2–2 | 0–1 | 1–0 | 2–0 | 0–2 | 3–0 | 0–1 | 1–1 | | 2–0 | 2–5 | 5–1 | 4–0 | 1–0 | 1–0 |
| Lokomotiv Sofia | 2–2 | 1–2 | 3–0 | 0–0 | 0–3 | 2–1 | 3–0 | 1–1 | 0–2 | 1–1 | | 0–1 | 1–0 | 0–0 | 0–1 | 1–0 |
| Ludogorets Razgrad | 3–1 | 2–0 | 4–1 | 2–0 | 3–0 | 1–0 | 4–0 | 2–1 | 0–0 | 1–0 | 2–1 | | 3–0 | 3–0 | 1–1 | 2–1 |
| Minyor Pernik | 3–0 | 0–2 | 0–1 | 0–2 | 0–1 | 1–4 | 1–0 | 0–4 | 1–2 | 1–1 | 0–0 | 1–2 | | 2–1 | 2–0 | 2–4 |
| Montana | 1–3 | 0–2 | 0–0 | 3–1 | 1–0 | 1–3 | 2–3 | 0–2 | 1–3 | 1–2 | 2–3 | 0–3 | 2–0 | | 3–0 | 0–1 |
| Pirin Gotse Delchev | 0–0 | 0–1 | 2–1 | 3–2 | 0–1 | 0–5 | 2–2 | 1–1 | 0–2 | 2–1 | 2–0 | 0–2 | 2–1 | 4–2 | | 0–3 |
| Slavia Sofia | 6–1 | 2–2 | 1–2 | 1–0 | 3–0 | 0–2 | 3–0 | 1–3 | 2–1 | 2–0 | 2–0 | 0–0 | 0–0 | 2–1 | 2–0 | |

Source: A PFG (in Bulgarian)
Legend: Blue = home team win; Yellow = draw; Red = away team win.

== Champions ==
Ludogorets Razgrad

Goalkeepers
| 1 | (Serbia) Uroš Golubović | 6 | (0) |
| 21 | (Bulgaria) Vladislav Stoyanov | 14 | (0) |
| 91 | (Bulgaria) Ivan Čvorović | 10 | (0) |

Defenders
| 4 | (Finland) Tero Mäntylä | 5 | (0) |
| 5 | (France) Alexandre Barthe | 14 | (3) |
| 20 | (Brazil) Guilherme Choco | 6 | (0) |
| 25 | (Bulgaria) Yordan Minev | 24 | (0) |
| 27 | (Romania) Cosmin Moți | 21 | (1) |
| 33 | (Slovakia) Ľubomír Guldan | 22 | (2) |
| 77 | (Portugal) Vitinha | 4 | (0) |
| 80 | (Brazil) Júnior Caiçara | 28 | (0) |

Midfielders
| 6 | (Bulgaria) Georgi Kostadinov | 6 | (0) |
| 7 | (Bulgaria) Mihail Aleksandrov | 15 | (5) |
| 8 | (Bulgaria) Stanislav Genchev | 28 | (3) |
| 10 | (Colombia) Sebastián Hernández | 9 | (0) |
| 14 | (Netherlands) Mitchell Burgzorg | 12 | (2) |
| 15 | (Serbia) Nemanja Milisavljević | 6 | (0) |
| 18 | (Bulgaria) Svetoslav Dyakov | 28 | (3) |
| 19 | (Bulgaria) Dimo Bakalov | 15 | (4) |
| 22 | (Bulgaria) Miroslav Ivanov | 26 | (4) |
| 84 | (Brazil) Marcelinho | 25 | (6) |
| 99 | (Ivory Coast) Franck Guela* | 13 | (1) |

Forwards
| 9 | (Slovenia) Roman Bezjak | 14 | (5) |
| 11 | (Brazil) Juninho Quixadá | 17 | (3) |
| 23 | (Bulgaria) Emil Gargorov | 22 | (6) |
| 73 | (Bulgaria) Ivan Stoyanov | 28 | (9) |

Manager
| (Bulgaria) Ivaylo Petev |

- Guela left the club during a season.

== Season statistics ==
=== Top scorers ===
| Rank | Scorer | Club | Goals |
|---|---|---|---|
| 1 | (Guinea-Bissau) Basile de Carvalho | Levski Sofia | 19 |
| 2 | (Bulgaria) Ivan Tsvetkov | Botev Plovdiv | 17 |
| 3 | (Bulgaria) Georgi Milanov | Litex Lovech | 16 |
| 4 | (Bulgaria) Georgi Andonov | Beroe Stara Zagora | 12 |
| 5 | (Bulgaria) Ismail Isa | Litex Lovech | 11 |
| 6 | (Bulgaria) Todor Nedelev | Botev Plovdiv | 9 |
| 6 | (Bulgaria) Ivan Stoyanov | Ludogorets Razgrad | 9 |
| 6 | (Albania) Armando Vajushi | Litex Lovech | 9 |
| 9 | (Bulgaria) Rangel Abushev | Lokomotiv Plovdiv | 8 |
| 9 | (Bulgaria) Ventsislav Hristov | Beroe Stara Zagora / Chernomorets Burgas | 8 |
| 9 | (Brazil) Michel Platini | CSKA Sofia | 8 |

== Awards ==
=== Weekly awards ===
==== Player of the Round ====
| Round | Player of the Round | |
| Round | Player | Club |
|---|---|---|
| Round 1 | (Bulgaria) Ivan Tsvetkov | Botev Plovdiv |
| Round 2 | (Bulgaria) Simeon Raykov | Levski Sofia |
| Round 3 | (Brazil) Marcelinho | Ludogorets Razgrad |
| Round 4 | (Guinea-Bissau) Basile de Carvalho | Levski Sofia |
| Round 5 | (Madagascar) Anicet Andrianantenaina | CSKA Sofia |
| Round 6 | (Brazil) Marcelinho | Ludogorets Razgrad |
| Round 7 | (Bulgaria) Emil Gargorov | Ludogorets Razgrad |
| Round 8 | (Bulgaria) Todor Nedelev | Botev Plovdiv |
| Round 9 | (Togo) Serge Nyuiadzi | CSKA Sofia |
| Round 10 | (Bulgaria) Georgi Milanov | Litex Lovech |
| Round 11 | (Bulgaria) Ismail Isa | Litex Lovech |
| Round 12 | (Bulgaria) Ivan Tsvetkov | Botev Plovdiv |
| Round 13 | (Bulgaria) Stanislav Genchev | Ludogorets Razgrad |
| Round 14 | (Guinea-Bissau) Basile de Carvalho | Levski Sofia |
| Round 15 | (Portugal) João Silva | Levski Sofia |
| Round 16 | (Albania) Armando Vajushi | Litex Lovech |
| Round 17 | (Portugal) Serginho | CSKA Sofia |
| Round 18 | (Bulgaria) Georgi Milanov | Litex Lovech |
| Round 19 | (Bulgaria) Georgi Bozhilov | Cherno More |
| Round 20 | (Brazil) Michel Platini Mesquita | Cska Sofia |
| Round 21 | (Bulgaria) Georgi Milanov | Litex Lovech |
| Round 22 | (Bulgaria) Zdravko Lazarov | Slavia Sofia |
| Round 23 | (Cape Verde) Garry Rodrigues | Levski Sofia |
| Round 24 | (Portugal) João Silva | Levski Sofia |
| Round 25 | (Brazil) Marcinho | CSKA Sofia |
| Round 26 | (Bulgaria) Yordan Gospodinov | Lokomotiv Plovdiv |
| Round 27 | (Bulgaria) Ivan Tsvetkov | Botev Plovdiv |
| Round 28 | (Bulgaria) Stanislav Angelov | Levski Sofia |
| Round 29 | (Bulgaria) Iliya Iliev | Botev Vratsa |

== Transfers ==
- List of Bulgarian football transfers summer 2012
- List of Bulgarian football transfers winter 2012–13

== Attendances ==
| No. | Club | Average |
|---|---|---|
| 1 | Botev | 8,071 |
| 2 | Levski | 5,510 |
| 3 | Beroe | 3,443 |
| 4 | Lokomotiv Plovdiv | 3,393 |
| 5 | CSKA Sofia | 3,327 |
| 6 | Ludogorets | 2,710 |
| 7 | Cherno More | 2,663 |
| 8 | Pirin | 2,363 |
| 9 | Botev | 2,033 |
| 10 | Montana | 1,503 |
| 11 | Chernomorets | 1,459 |
| 12 | Lovech | 1,427 |
| 13 | Etar | 1,262 |
| 14 | Minyor | 1,027 |
| 15 | Slavia Sofia | 800 |
| 16 | Lokomotiv Sofia | 767 |
