= 2012–13 PFC Levski Sofia season =

Levski Sofia
2012–13 season
- Chairman: Todor Batkov
- Manager: Ilian Iliev (until 12 April 2013); Nikolay Mitov
- Stadium: Georgi Asparuhov
- A Group: 2nd
- Bulgarian Cup: Runners-up
- UEFA Europa League: Second qualifying round
- Top goalscorer: League: Basile de Carvalho (19); All: Basile de Carvalho (20)
- Highest home attendance: 18,000 v. CSKA Sofia (27 April 2013)
- Lowest home attendance: 350 v. Beroe (7 April 2013)
- Biggest win: 7–1 v. Etar
- Biggest defeat: 1–3 v. Sarajevo
Home colours	Away colours

The 2012–13 season is Levski Sofia's 91st season in the First League. This article shows player statistics and all matches (official and friendly) that the club has played during the 2012–13 season.

== Transfers ==
=== Summer transfers ===
In:

No.	Pos.	Nation	Player
—	DF	FRA	Romain Élie (from (France) Arles-Avignon)
—	DF	BUL	Dimitar Vezalov (from Beroe)
—	MF	BUL	Stanislav Angelov (free transfer)
—	MF	SVK	Roman Procházka (from (Slovakia) Spartak Trnava)
—	MF	BRA	Marcinho (from (Cyprus) APOEL)
—	FW	GNB	Basile de Carvalho (from Lokomotiv Plovdiv)
—	FW	GHA	Agyemang Opoku (from (Qatar) Al Sadd)
—	FW	POR	João Silva (from (England) Everton)
—	FW	BUL	Iliyan Yordanov (free transfer)

Out:

No.	Pos.	Nation	Player
3	MF	NED	Serginho Greene (end of contract)
4	DF	BUL	Stefan Stanchev (to Botev Plovdiv)
8	FW	ESP	Toni Calvo (end of contract)
8	FW	BUL	Ivan Tsvetkov (to Botev Plovdiv)
17	FW	BUL	Daniel Mladenov (released)
22	MF	MKD	Darko Tasevski (to (Israel) Ironi Kiryat Shmona)
24	GK	BUL	Bozhidar Mitrev (end of contract)
25	DF	MLI	Souleymane Diamouténé (released)
30	MF	BUL	Lachezar Baltanov (released)
55	DF	BUL	Yordan Miliev (on loan to (Israel) Ironi Ramat HaSharon)
55	DF	BUL	Ivo Ivanov (to Beroe)

See List of Bulgarian football transfers summer 2012

=== Winter transfers ===
In:

No.	Pos.	Nation	Player
—	GK	BUL	Mihail Ivanov (from Botev Vratsa)
—	DF	BUL	Yordan Miliev (loan return from (Israel) Ramat HaSharon)
—	DF	BUL	Plamen Dimov (from Chernomorets Burgas)
—	MF	BUL	Stefan Velev (from Beroe)
—	MF	SVN	Rene Mihelič (on loan from (Portugal) C.D. Nacional)
—	FW	BUL	Milen Vasilev (from Minyor Pernik)
—	FW	NED	Sjoerd Ars (loan return from (China) Tianjin Teda)
—	FW	CPV	Garry Rodrigues (from (Netherlands) ADO Den Haag)

Out:

No.	Pos.	Nation	Player
1	GK	BUL	Ivaylo Vasilev (on loan to Septemvri Simitli)
11	FW	BUL	Simeon Raykov (to Cherno More)
14	FW	GHA	Agyemang Opoku (released)
20	DF	BUL	Aleksandar Bashliev (to Chernomorets Burgas)
21	FW	BUL	Tsvetelin Tonev (on loan to Botev Vratsa)
31	MF	BRA	Marcinho (released)
—	DF	BUL	Hristo Popadiyn (on loan to (Italy) Chievo)
—	FW	NED	Sjoerd Ars (on loan to (Turkey) Konyaspor)

See List of Bulgarian football transfers winter 2013

== Squad ==
Note: Flags indicate national team as defined under FIFA eligibility rules; some limited exceptions apply. Players may hold more than one non-FIFA nationality.

No.	Pos.	Nation	Player
2	DF	NED	Dustley Mulder
3	DF	FRA	Romain Élie
4	MF	BUL	Stanislav Angelov (captain)
6	DF	BUL	Orlin Starokin
7	FW	BUL	Milen Vasilev
8	MF	SVK	Roman Procházka
9	FW	POR	João Silva
10	MF	BUL	Hristo Yovov
11	FW	CPV	Garry Rodrigues
13	DF	BUL	Dimitar Vezalov
16	FW	POR	Cristóvão Ramos
19	FW	GNB	Basile de Carvalho

No.	Pos.	Nation	Player
22	FW	BUL	Iliyan Yordanov
23	GK	BUL	Plamen Iliev
25	MF	BUL	Daniel Dimov
28	DF	POR	Nuno Pinto
29	MF	SVN	Rene Mihelič (on loan from Nacional)
30	FW	BUL	Antonio Vutov
35	DF	BUL	Plamen Dimov
45	MF	BUL	Vladimir Gadzhev (vice-captain)
55	DF	BUL	Yordan Miliev
77	MF	BUL	Stefan Velev
89	GK	BUL	Mihail Ivanov

== Statistics ==
=== Goalscorers ===
Players	League	Cup	Europa League	Total
(Guinea-Bissau) Basile de Carvalho	19	0	1	20
(Portugal) João Silva	7	5	0	12
(Cape Verde) Garry Rodrigues	3	4	0	7
(Netherlands) Dustley Mulder	2	3	0	5
(Bulgaria) Simeon Raykov	3	0	1	4
(Bulgaria) Iliyan Yordanov	4	1	0	5
(Portugal) Cristóvão Ramos	3	1	0	4
(Brazil) Marcinho	3	0	0	3
(Bulgaria) Hristo Yovov	2	1	0	3
(France) Romain Élie	2	0	0	2
(Bulgaria) Stanislav Angelov	2	0	0	2
(Bulgaria) Vladimir Gadzhev	1	0	0	1
(Bulgaria) Antonio Vutov	1	0	0	1
(Bulgaria) Daniel Dimov	1	0	0	1
(Slovenia) Rene Mihelič	1	0	0	1
(Bulgaria) Stefan Velev	0	1	0	1

=== Cards ===
Player	Booked	Sent off (straight red)	Total
(Netherlands) Dustley Mulder	10	1	11
(Bulgaria) Stanislav Angelov	10	1	11
(Portugal) Cristóvão Ramos	8	1	9
(Bulgaria) Daniel Dimov	7	1	8
(Slovakia) Roman Procházka	7	0	7
(Bulgaria) Orlin Starokin	7	0	7
(France) Romain Élie	7	0	7
(Bulgaria) Vladimir Gadzhev	5	1	6
(Bulgaria) Iliyan Yordanov	6	0	6
(Portugal) Nuno Pinto	5	0	5
(Bulgaria) Stefan Velev	5	0	5
(Guinea-Bissau) Basile de Carvalho	4	0	4
(Bulgaria) Simeon Raykov	3	0	3
(Bulgaria) Plamen Iliev	3	0	3
(Bulgaria) Hristo Yovov	3	0	3
(Bulgaria) Yordan Miliev	3	0	3
(Slovenia) Rene Mihelič	1	1	2
(Cape Verde) Garry Rodrigues	2	0	2
(Portugal) João Silva	2	0	2
(Brazil) Marcinho	1	0	1
(Bulgaria) Aleksandar Bashliev	1	0	1
(Bulgaria) Iliyan Yordanov	1	0	1

== Pre-season and friendlies ==
=== Summer ===
1 July 2012	Levski Sofia (Bulgaria)	2–0	(Ukraine) Metalurh Donetsk	Enzesfeld-Lindabrunn
17:30 EET	Ivanov 52'; Marcinho 73'	Report

5 July 2012	Levski Sofia (Bulgaria)	0–2	(Ukraine) Chornomorets Odesa	Enzesfeld-Lindabrunn
17:30 EET		Report	Burdujan 28'; Berger 35'

7 July 2012	Levski Sofia (Bulgaria)	2–1	(Hungary) Győri	Enzesfeld-Lindabrunn
17:00 EET	Marcinho 28' de Carvalho 55'	Report	Střeštík 73'

10 July 2012	Levski Sofia (Bulgaria)	3–3	(Austria) 1. FC Sollenau SC	Enzesfeld-Lindabrunn
17:30 EET	Vutov 16'; Opoku 55' (pen.); Chavorski 84'	Report	Lalic 18'; Csandl 30'; Tiroy 68'

10 July 2012	Levski Sofia (Bulgaria)	1–0	(Romania) Pandurii	Enzesfeld-Lindabrunn
19:30 EET	de Carvalho 19'	Report

1 August 2012	Levski Sofia	1–0	Slivnishki Geroy	Slivnitsa
17:30 EET	Angelov 53'	Report

4 August 2012	Levski Sofia	4–1	Pirin Gotse Delchev	Sofia
19:30 EET	Mulder 29' de Carvalho 36'; Marcinho 41'; Procházka 76'	Report	Pirgov 73'	Stadium: Georgi Asparuhov; Attendance: 1 200; Referee: Angel Angelov

5 September 2012	Levski Sofia	2–1	Montana	Sofia
18:00 EET	Silva 17' (pen.); D. Dimov 78'		Hristov 30'	Stadium: Georgi Asparuhov

=== Winter ===
26 January 2013	Levski Sofia (Bulgaria)	0–2	(Switzerland) Aarau	Ayia Napa, Cyprus
17:00 EET		Report	Senger 16', 27'

30 January 2013	Levski Sofia (Bulgaria)	3–3	(Czech Republic) Viktoria Plzeň	Ayia Napa, Cyprus
17:30 EET	S. Velev 41'; Silva 48'; Gadzhev 69'	Report	Ďuriš 3'; Limberský 36' (pen.); Bakoš 62'

6 February 2013	Levski Sofia (Bulgaria)	2–0	(Russia) Lokomotiv Moscow	Larnaca, Cyprus
17:30 EET	Gadzhev 67' de Carvalho 85' (pen.)	Report		Stadium: GSZ Stadium

9 February 2013	Levski Sofia (Bulgaria)	2–2	(Poland) Śląsk Wrocław	Paralimni, Cyprus
EET	Gadzhev 7' (pen.); Yovov 75'	Report	Patejuk 46'; Diaz 52' (pen.)	Stadium: Paralimni Stadium

13 February 2013	Levski Sofia (Bulgaria)	2–2	(Czech Republic) Dukla Prague	Achna, Cyprus
14:30 EET	Angelov 63' de Carvalho 65'	Report	Božić 2' (pen.); Malý 6'	Stadium: Dasaki Stadium

15 February 2013	Levski Sofia (Bulgaria)	1–1	(Armenia) Impuls FC	Ayia Napa, Cyprus
EET	Ayvazyan 29' (o.g.)	Report	Gyozalyan 9'

17 February 2013	Levski Sofia (Bulgaria)	2–2	(Russia) Rostov	Ayia Napa, Cyprus
EET	de Carvalho 20', 73' (pen.)	Report	Pongolle 21', 63'

23 February 2013	Levski Sofia	3–0	Vidima-Rakovski	Sofia
EET	de Carvalho 9', 21'; Krachunov 75' (o.g.)	Report		Stadium: Georgi Asparuhov; Attendance: 2 000; Referee: Martin Stoimenov

== Competitions ==
=== A Group ===
==== Table ====
Pos	Team	Pld	W	D	L	GF	GA	GD	Pts	Qualification or relegation
1	Ludogorets Razgrad (C)	30	22	6	2	58	13	+45	72	Qualification for Champions League second qualifying round
2	Levski Sofia	30	22	5	3	59	20	+39	71	Qualification for Europa League first qualifying round
3	CSKA Sofia	30	19	6	5	54	20	+34	63	Excluded from European competitions (Note: PFC CSKA Sofia were excluded from European competitions due to debts.)
4	Botev Plovdiv	30	18	6	6	51	21	+30	60	Qualification for Europa League first qualifying round
5	Litex Lovech	30	15	5	10	56	24	+32	50	

Source: A PFG (in Bulgarian)
Rules for classification: 1st points; 2nd head-to-head points; 3rd head-to-head goal difference; 4th head-to-head goals scored; 5th head-to-head away goals scored; 6th goal difference; 7th goals scored
(C) Champions

==== Results summary ====
Overall								Home						Away					
Pld	W	D	L	GF	GA	GD	Pts	W	D	L	GF	GA	GD	W	D	L	GF	GA	GD
30	22	5	3	59	20	+39	71	13	2	0	33	8	+25	9	3	3	26	12	+14

Source: Competitive matches

==== Results by round ====
Round	1	2	3	4	5	6	7	8	9	10	11	12	13	14	15	16	17	18	19	20	21	22	23	24	25	26	27	28	29	30
Ground	H	H	A	H	A	H	A	H	A	H	A	H	A	H	A	A	A	H	A	H	A	H	A	H	A	H	A	H	A	H
Result	W	W	W	W	W	W	D	W	L	W	W	W	L	W	W	W	L	W	W	W	D	W	W	W	W	W	W	W	W	D
Position	6	2	2	1	1	1	2	2	2	2	2	1	2	2	2	2	2	2	2	2	2	2	2	2	2	2	2	1	1	2

A = Away; H = Home; W = Win; D = Draw; L = Loss

==== Fixtures and results ====
11 August 2012 1	Levski Sofia	1–0	Chernomorets Burgas	Sofia
20:00 (EET)	de Carvalho 65'	Report	Palankov (yellow card) 51'; Faug-Porret (yellow card) 62'	Stadium: Georgi Asparuhov; Attendance: 4,500; Referee: Aleksandar Kostadinov

19 August 2012 2	Levski Sofia	3–1	Botev Plovdiv	Sofia
20:00 (EET)	Raykov 15', 22'; Angelov (yellow card) 77' (goal) 78'; Ramos (yellow card) 79'	Report	Jirsák (yellow card) 24'; Henrique 42'; Grncharov (yellow card) 82'	Stadium: Georgi Asparuhov; Attendance: 10,000; Referee: Hristo Ristoskov

25 August 2012 3	Montana	0–2	Levski Sofia	Montana
18:00 (EET)	Petkov (yellow card) 62'; Lichkov (yellow card) 76'	Report	de Carvalho 10'; Angelov (yellow card) 28'; Élie (yellow card) 36'; Raykov (yellow card) 40'; Mulder 77'	Stadium: Ogosta; Attendance: 4,000; Referee: Nikolay Yordanov

31 August 2012 4	Levski Sofia	4–0	Cherno More	Sofia
19:00 (EET)	Ramos 6' de Carvalho 11', 64'; Procházka (yellow card) 28'; Marcinho 44'; Starokin (yellow card) 58'; Élie (yellow card) 84'	Report	Dechev (yellow card) 25'; Dimitrov (yellow card) 62'	Stadium: Georgi Asparuhov; Attendance: 7,000; Referee: Nikola Popov

16 September 2012 5	Beroe	1–2	Levski Sofia	Stara Zagora
20:00 (EET)	Caiado 35' (pen.); Zafirov (yellow card) 40'; Elias (yellow card) 42'; Penev (yellow card) 81'; Martins (yellow card) 88'	Report	Procházka (yellow card) 21'; Angelov (yellow card) 34'; Marcinho 62' de Carvalho 75'	Stadium: Beroe; Attendance: 10,000; Referee: Stanislav Todorov

22 September 2012 6	Levski Sofia	2–0	Pirin Gotse Delchev	Sofia
19:00 (EET)	de Carvalho 53' (pen.); Yordanov 62'; Gadzhev (yellow card) 90'	Report	Gutsev (yellow card) 51'; Hodža (yellow card) 54'	Stadium: Georgi Asparuhov; Attendance: 5,000; Referee: Stanislav Stavrov

29 September 2012 7	Lokomotiv Sofia	1–1	Levski Sofia	Sofia
17:00 (EET)	Velev (yellow card) 6'; Petrov (yellow card) 23'; Telkiyski (yellow card) 25'; Dobrev (yellow card) 44'; Velkov (yellow card) 44'; Galev (yellow card) 45'; Varbanov (yellow card) 87'; Pavlov 90+1'	Report	Ramos (yellow card) 25' de Carvalho 32', (yellow card) 81'; Gadzhev (red card) 45'; Procházka (yellow card) 73'	Stadium: Slavia; Attendance: 3,500; Referee: Aleksandar Kostadinov

5 October 2012 8	Levski Sofia	2–1	Litex Lovech	Sofia
19:00 (EET)	de Carvalho 29'; Procházka (yellow card) 40'; Ramos (yellow card) 44' (yellow-red card) 46'; Raykov 84', (yellow card) 85'; Iliev (yellow card) 90'	Report	Jelenković (yellow card) 29'; I. Milanov (yellow card) 36'; Tsvetkov (yellow card) 38' (yellow-red card) 74'; G. Milanov 62'; Zakov (yellow card) 77'	Stadium: Georgi Asparuhov; Attendance: 10,000; Referee: Georgi Yordanov

20 October 2012 9	CSKA Sofia	1–0	Levski Sofia	Sofia
16:00 (EET)	Karachanakov (yellow card) 24'; Bandalovski (yellow card) 45'; Nyuiadzi (yellow card) 45' (goal) 46'; Sérginho (yellow card) 85'; Păcurar (yellow card) 88'	Report	Mulder (yellow card) 37'; Starokin (yellow card) 76'; Angelov (yellow card) 86'	Stadium: Vasil Levski National Stadium; Attendance: 15,000; Referee: Stanislav Todorov

27 October 2012 10	Levski Sofia	2–1	Lokomotiv Plovdiv	Sofia
18:00 (EET)	Élie 33'; Silva 49'; Angelov (yellow card) 85'; Procházka (yellow card) 87'	Report	Kotev (yellow card) 39'; Pinto 60' (o.g.); Kavdanski (yellow card) 62'; Gospodinov (yellow card) 88'; Georgiev (yellow card) 90'	Stadium: Georgi Asparuhov; Attendance: 4,000; Referee: Georgi Ignatov

4 November 2012 11	Minyor Pernik	0–4	Levski Sofia	Pernik
13:30 (EET)	Iliev (yellow card) 74'	Report	Boumelaha 14' (o.g.); Yordanov (yellow card) 22'; Starokin (yellow card) 33' de Carvalho 41'; Gadzhev 49'; Ramos 59'; D. Dimov (yellow card) 79'	Stadium: Minyor; Attendance: 5,000; Referee: Kalin Lyudmilov

10 November 2012 12	Levski Sofia	2–0	Botev Vratsa	Sofia
16:00 (EET)	Marcinho 5'; Iliev (yellow card) 29'; Élie (yellow card) 55'; Ramos (yellow card) 68'; Mulder 72'	Report	Marinov (yellow card) 29'; Varela (yellow card) 72'; Hristov (yellow card) 87'	Stadium: Georgi Asparuhov; Attendance: 2,000; Referee: Ahmed Ahmed

18 November 2012 13	Ludogorets	2–1	Levski Sofia	Razgrad
16:30 (EET)	Genchev 12', 58'; Minev (yellow card) 15'; Caiçara (yellow card) 45'; Dyakov (yellow card) 70'; Marcelinho (yellow card) 88'; Aleksandrov (yellow card) 90'	Report	de Carvalho (yellow card) 15'; Élie (yellow card) 18'; Yordanov 47'; D. Dimov (yellow card) 57'; Gadzhev (yellow card) 76'; Mulder (yellow card) 79'; Starokin (yellow card) 89'	Stadium: Ludogorets Arena; Attendance: 5,000; Referee: Nikolay Yordanov

28 November 2012 14	Levski Sofia	7–1	Etar	Sofia
16:30 (EET)	de Carvalho 16', 34' (pen.), 37', 58'; Vutov 51'; Rusev 67' (o.g.); Yordanov 90+2'	Report	Gadzhalov (yellow card) 34'; Hikmet (yellow card) 45'; Nery 79'	Stadium: Georgi Asparuhov; Attendance: 2,000; Referee: Borislav Kolev

8 December 2012 15	Slavia Sofia	1–3	Levski Sofia	Sofia
14:00 (EET)	Lazarov 23'; Genev (yellow card) 38'; Dyakov (yellow card) 44'; Sandanski (yellow card) 55' (yellow-red card) 57'; Akiyoshi (yellow card) 68'; Zlatkov (yellow card) 80'	Report	D. Dimov 12'; Mulder (yellow card) 27'; Silva (yellow card) 42', (goal) 46', 48'; Angelov (yellow card) 43'; Procházka (yellow card) 45'; Ramos (yellow card) 86'	Stadium: Slavia; Attendance: 2,000; Referee: Ivaylo Stoyanov

3 March 2013 16	Chernomorets Burgas	0–2	Levski Sofia	Burgas
16:00 (EET)	Filipov (yellow card) 64'; Stoyanov (yellow card) 73'	Report	Miliev (yellow card) 19' de Carvalho 38', 44'; Rodrigues (yellow card) 64'; Angelov (yellow card) 90'	Stadium: Lazur; Attendance: 6,000; Referee: Nikolay Yordanov

9 March 2013 17	Botev Plovdiv	2–0	Levski Sofia	Plovdiv
15:00 (EET)	Grncharov 28' (yellow card) 44'; Henrique (yellow card) 32'; Jirsák (yellow card) 38'; Tsvetkov 64'; Hristov (yellow card) 72'	Report	Pinto (yellow card) 39'; Angelov (yellow card) 40' (yellow-red card) 60'; Mulder (yellow card) 43'; Iliev (yellow card) 51'; Miliev (yellow card) 57'; Ramos (yellow card) 69'	Stadium: Hristo Botev; Attendance: 18,000; Referee: Stanislav Todorov

17 March 2013 18	Levski Sofia	0–0	Montana	Sofia
18:00 (EET)	Pinto (yellow card) 34'; Velev (yellow card) 43'; Gadzhev (yellow card) 90'	Report	Brahimi (yellow card) 28'; Shokolarov (yellow card) 61'	Stadium: Georgi Asparuhov; Attendance: 3,000; Referee: Hristo Ristoskov

30 March 2013 19	Cherno More	1–1	Levski Sofia	Varna
15:00 (EET)	Manolov (yellow card) 5'; Bozhilov 9'; Kolev (yellow card) 13'; Aleksandrov (yellow card) 18'; Camazzola (yellow card) 51'; Komel (yellow card) 60'	Report	Mihelič 12', (yellow card) 29'; D. Dimov (yellow card) 28'; Mulder (yellow card) 57'	Stadium: Ticha; Attendance: 11,000; Referee: Ivaylo Stoyanov

7 April 2013 20	Levski Sofia	2–0	Beroe	Sofia
16:00 (EET)	Yordanov 23', (yellow card) 62'; Carvalho 30'; Yovov (yellow card) 60'; D. Dimov (yellow card) 74'	Report	Stoychev (yellow card) 54'; Elias (yellow card) 72'	Stadium: Georgi Asparuhov; Attendance: 350; Referee: Angel Angelov

10 April 2013 21	Pirin Gotse Delchev	1–1	Levski Sofia	Gotse Delchev
16:00 (EET)	Vitanov (yellow card) 39', (goal) 82' (pen.); Abdikov (yellow card) 84'; Gutsev (yellow card) 88'	Report	Élie 40'; Ramos (yellow card) 49'; Starokin (yellow card) 81'	Stadium: Gradski; Attendance: 4,000; Referee: Martin Bogdev

13 April 2013 22	Levski Sofia	2–1	Lokomotiv Sofia	Sofia
15:00 (EET)	de Carvalho 18' (pen.); Élie (yellow card) 24'; Mulder (yellow card) 38'; Mihelič (red card) 65'; Silva 78'	Report	Tom (yellow card) 14' (yellow-red card) 23'; Dyulgerov (yellow card) 18'; Bibishkov 59'; Branekov (red card) 73'	Stadium: Georgi Asparuhov; Attendance: 3,000; Referee: Stefan Spasov

20 April 2013 23	Litex Lovech	1–2	Levski Sofia	Lovech
17:00 (EET)	Popov (yellow card) 35'; I. Milanov 80'	Report	Rodrigues (yellow card) 18', (goal) 30'; Pinto (yellow card) 29'; Yordanov (yellow card) 32'; Yovov (yellow card) 44', (goal) 62'; Starokin (yellow card) 64'; D. Dimov (yellow card) 87'; Silva (penalty missed) 90+5'	Stadium: Gradski; Attendance: 5,000; Referee: Nikolay Yordanov

27 April 2013 24	Levski Sofia	2–1	CSKA Sofia	Sofia
16:00 (EET)	Yordanov (yellow card) 12'; Yovov 40'; Angelov (yellow card) 56'; D. Dimov (yellow card) 69'; Silva 90', (yellow card) 90'	Report	Stoyanov (yellow card) 46'; Delev (yellow card) 49'; Marcinho 70'; Bandalovski (yellow card) 88'	Stadium: Vasil Levski National Stadium; Attendance: 18,000; Referee: Georgi Yordanov

2 May 2013 25	Lokomotiv Plovdiv	0–1	Levski Sofia	Plovdiv
17:00 (EET)	Kavdanski (yellow card) 42'; Markov (yellow card) 81'; Zlatinski (yellow card) 85'; Zapryanov (yellow card) 90'	Report	Ramos 38'; Mulder (yellow card) 42' (yellow-red card) 47'; Mihelič (yellow card) 56'	Stadium: Lokomotiv; Attendance: 6,000; Referee: Radan Miryanov

6 May 2013 26	Levski Sofia	2–1	Minyor Pernik	Sofia
18:00 (EET)	Silva 64'; Iliev (yellow card) 86'; Pinto (yellow card) 90'; Gadzhev (yellow card) 90'; Rodrigues 90'	Report	Aleksandrov (yellow card) 39'; Stoyanov (yellow card) 47'; Sofroniev (yellow card) 57'; Peykov (yellow card) 62'; Pavlov 81'; Yakassongo (red card) 87'	Stadium: Georgi Asparuhov; Attendance: 3,000; Referee: Stefan Apostolov

10 May 2013 27	Botev Vratsa	1–3	Levski Sofia	Vratsa
18:00 (EET)	Atanasov 34' (yellow card) 39'; Mitov (yellow card) 35'; Hristov (yellow card) 43'; Savić (yellow card) 60'; Marinov (yellow card) 70'	Report	de Carvalho 35'; Rodrigues 73' (pen.); Velev (yellow card) 76'; Élie (yellow card) 80'; Silva 90+4'	Stadium: Hristo Botev; Attendance: 4,000; Referee: Stoyan Delev

18 May 2013 28	Levski Sofia	1–0	Ludogorets	Sofia
20:00 (EET)	D. Dimov (yellow card) 12'; Angelov (yellow card) 21', (goal) 90+2'; Velev (yellow card) 35'; Miliev (yellow card) 41'; Yordanov (yellow card) 58'; Gadzhev (yellow card) 87'	Report	Ivanov (yellow card) 7'; Genchev (yellow card) 18'; Guldan (yellow card) 39' (yellow-red card) 85'; Dyakov (yellow card) 48'; Moți (yellow card) 54'; Minev (yellow card) 62'; Stoyanov (yellow card) 86'	Stadium: Georgi Asparuhov; Attendance: 15,000; Referee: Georgi Yordanov

22 May 2013 29	Etar	0–3 (w/o)	Levski Sofia	Veliko Tarnovo
18:00 (EET)				Stadium: Ivaylo
Note: Etar were dismissed from A PFG.

25 May 2013 30	Levski Sofia	1–1	Slavia Sofia	Sofia
18:00 (EET)	de Carvalho 33'; Velev (yellow card) 50'; Ramos (yellow card) 62'; Yordanov (yellow card) 73'	Report	Sandanski (yellow card) 36'; Zhelev (yellow card) 66'; Vezalov 75' (o.g.); Matsui (yellow card) 76'; Popara (yellow card) 77'; G. Petkov (yellow card) 81'; Dimitrov (yellow card) 84'	Stadium: Georgi Asparuhov; Attendance: 15,000; Referee: Nikola Popov

=== Bulgarian Cup ===
31 October 2012 Second round 1st leg	Levski Sofia	3–0	Pirin Razlog	Sofia
17:00 EEST	Ramos 29'; Silva 57'; Yovov 79'	Report	Nakov (yellow card) 45'	Stadium: Georgi Asparuhov; Attendance: 1,000; Referee: Georgi Dimitrov

24 November 2012 Second round 2nd leg	Pirin Razlog	0–1 (0−4 agg.)	Levski Sofia	Razlog
13:00 EEST	Fikiyn (yellow card); Radanov (yellow card)	Report	Silva 90+1'; Bashliev (yellow card); Procházka (yellow card)	Stadium: Gradski; Attendance: 2,000; Referee: Dragan Stoykov

2 December 2012 Third round 1st leg	Levski Sofia	4–0	Cherno More	Sofia
15:45 EEST	Mulder 11', 51', (yellow card) 77'; Silva 54', 75' (pen.); Ramos (yellow card) 65'	Report	Camazzola (yellow card) 23'; Edenilson (yellow card) 37'; Manolov (yellow card) 72'; Aleksandrov (red card) 74'; Simeonov (yellow card) 83'	Stadium: Georgi Asparuhov; Attendance: 3,000; Referee: Stefan Spasov

15 December 2012 Third round 2nd leg	Cherno More	1–0 (1−4 agg.)	Levski Sofia	Varna
13:00 EEST	Dimitrov (yellow card) 28'; Manolov (yellow card) 58'; Kolev 69'	Report	Pinto (yellow card) 34'; D. Dimov (yellow card) 8' (yellow-red card) 68'	Stadium: Ticha; Attendance: 1,000; Referee: Georgi Kabakov

13 March 2013 Quarterfinals 1st leg	Levski Sofia	1–0	Litex Lovech	Sofia
18:00 EEST	Rodrigues 22' de Carvalho (yellow card) 32'; Procházka (yellow card) 41'; Gadzhev (yellow card) 64'; Velev (yellow card) 72'; Silva (yellow card) 90'	Report	I. Milanov (yellow card) 32'	Stadium: Georgi Asparuhov; Attendance: 0 (due to punishment from BFU); Referee: Ahmed Ahmed

3 April 2013 Quarterfinals 2nd leg	Litex Lovech	2–1 (2−2 (a) agg.)	Levski Sofia	Lovech
18:00 EEST	Isa (yellow card) 19', (goal) 75'; Tsvetkov (yellow card) 26'; G. Milanov 48'	Report	Yordanov (yellow card) 23'; Mulder 40'; Élie (yellow card) 45'; Starokin (yellow card) 71'; Yovov (yellow card) 90'	Stadium: Gradski; Attendance: 5,000; Referee: Stanislav Todorov

17 April 2013 Semifinals 1st leg	Levski Sofia	3–1	Lokomotiv Sofia	Sofia
17:45 EEST	Mulder (yellow card) 56'; Rodrigues 64', 75'; Velev 82'	Report	Petrov (yellow card) 36'; Bibishkov (yellow card) 44'; Iliev 81'	Stadium: Georgi Asparuhov; Attendance: 3,000; Referee: Hristo Ristoskov

24 April 2013 Semifinals 2nd leg	Lokomotiv Sofia	0–0 (1−3 agg.)	Levski Sofia	Sofia
15:30 EEST		Report	Miliev (yellow card) 21'; Élie (yellow card) 90'	Stadium: Lokomotiv; Attendance: 3,000; Referee: Nikola Popov

15 May 2013 Final	Beroe	3–3 (a.e.t.) (3–1 p)	Levski Sofia	Lovech
17:30 EEST	Martins 16', 28'; Stoychev (yellow card) 26'; Caiado (yellow card) 45'; Louzeiro (yellow card) 51'; Andonov 79', (yellow card) 80'; Sayoud (yellow card) 107'	Report	Yovov (yellow card) 19' (yellow-red card) 43'; Yordanov 24'; Pinto (yellow card) 66'; Silva 81' de Carvalho (yellow card) 82'; Rodrigues 87'	Stadium: Gradski; Attendance: 8,000; Referee: Tsvetan Krastev
	Penalties
	Sayoud (penalty missed); Ivanov (penalty scored); Krumov (penalty missed); Stoychev (penalty scored); Elias (penalty scored)		(penalty missed) Silva; (penalty missed) Mulder; (penalty missed) Velev; (penalty scored) Angelov

=== UEFA Europa League ===
==== Second qualifying round ====
19 July 2012 1st leg	Levski Sofia (Bulgaria)	1–0	(Bosnia and Herzegovina) Sarajevo	Sofia, Bulgaria
20:00 EEST	Gadzhev (yellow card) 2' de Carvalho (yellow card) 57'; Élie (yellow card) 67'; Raykov 72'	Report	Husejinović (yellow card) 23'; Čomor (yellow card) 65'	Stadium: Georgi Asparuhov; Attendance: 15,000; Referee: Bruno Paixão (Portugal)

26 July 2012 2nd leg	Sarajevo (Bosnia and Herzegovina)	3–1 (3−2 agg.)	(Bulgaria) Levski Sofia	Sarajevo, Bosnia and Herzegovina
21:00 CEST	Husejinović 12', 62'; Suljić 14', (yellow card) 15'; Hadžić (yellow card) 17'; Karamatić (yellow card) 88'	Report	de Carvalho 34' (pen.); Marcinho (yellow card) 43'; Angelov (yellow card) 50'; Starokin (yellow card) 66'; Raykov (yellow card) 73'	Stadium: Asim Ferhatović Hase; Attendance: 15,000; Referee: Cristian Balaj (Romania)
