= 2013 Bulgarian Cup final =

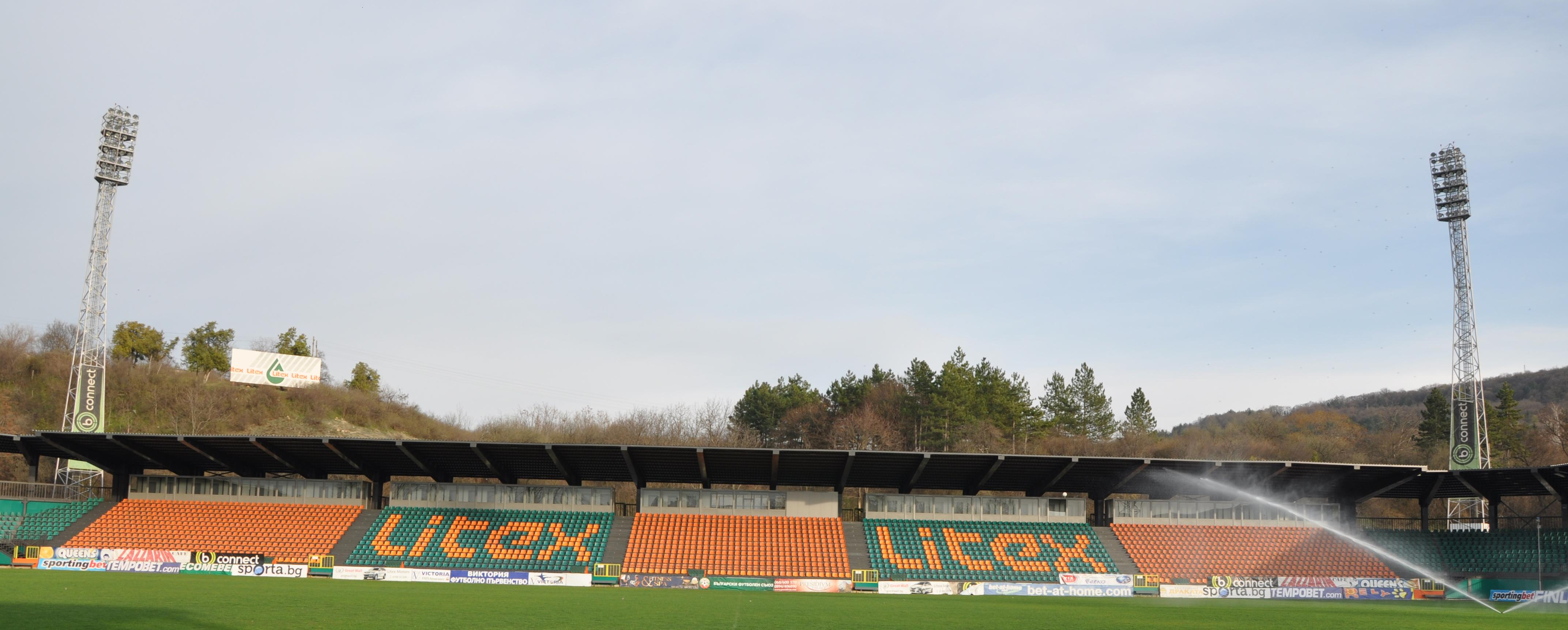

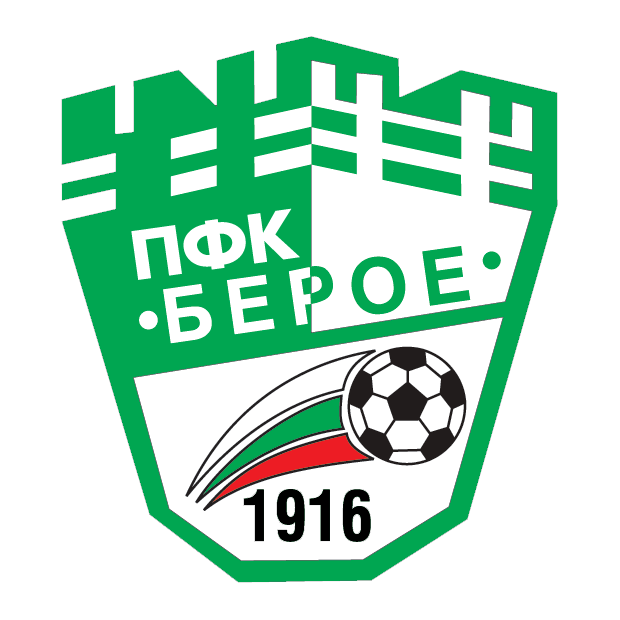

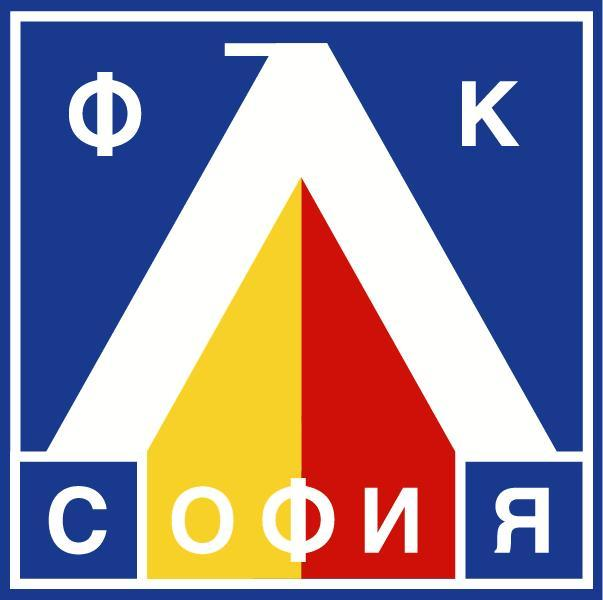
Beroe	Levski Sofia
3	3
- Beroe won 3–1 on penalties
- Date: 15 May 2013
- Venue: Lovech Stadium, Lovech
- Referee: Tsvetan Krastev
- Attendance: 7,800

The 2013 Bulgarian Cup final was the 73rd final of the Bulgarian Cup, and was contested between Beroe Stara Zagora and Levski Sofia on 15 May 2013. The match finished in a 3–3 draw, but Beroe clinched their second ever Bulgarian Cup title by winning 3–1 on penalties.

== Route to the final ==
Beroe			Round	Levski
Opponent	Result	Legs		Opponent	Result	Legs
Akademik Svishtov	4–1	1–0 home; 3–1 away	Round of 32	Pirin Razlog	4–0	3–0 home; 1–0 away
Lokomotiv Mezdra	8–1	4–0 home; 4–1 away	Round of 16	Cherno More	4–1	4–0 home; 0–1 away
Pirin Gotse Delchev	4–1	1–0 home; 3–1 away	Quarter-finals	Litex Lovech	2–2 (a)	1–0 home; 1–2 away
Slavia Sofia	1–0	0–0 away; 1–0 home	Semi-finals	Lokomotiv Sofia	3–1	3–1 home; 0–0 away

== Pre-match ==
Beroe reached the final for the second time in the last 3 years. The last time being in 2010 when they celebrated their first and only trophy in the competition. Levski on their side reached their first Bulgarian Cup final since 2007. The blues also hold the record in the tournament by winning 25 cups. This will be the second final in history held between these two clubs. The first one being in 1979 won by Levski with 4–1.

The final will take place at Lovech Stadium in Lovech. The stadium has more than 8100 seating places with pitch dimensions of 105 x 68 metres. Each of the two teams was allocated 3,700 tickets for the final, while the remainder went to the grassroots football community.

== Match ==
=== Details ===
15 May 2013
17:30 EET

Beroe	3–3 (a.e.t.)	Levski Sofia
Martins 16', 28'; Andonov 79'	Report	Yordanov 24'; Silva 81'; Rodrigues 87'
Penalties
Sayoud (penalty missed); Ivanov (penalty scored); Krumov (penalty missed); Stoychev (penalty scored); Elias (penalty scored)	3–1	(penalty missed) Silva; (penalty missed) Mulder; (penalty missed) Velev; (penalty scored) Angelov

Gradski, Lovech
Attendance: 7,800
Referee: Tsvetan Krastev

Beroe	Levski

GK	73	(Bulgaria) Ivan Karadzhov
DF	17	(Bulgaria) Plamen Krumov
DF	3	(Bulgaria) Vladimir Zafirov		(substituted off) 93'
DF	28	(Bulgaria) Veselin Penev
DF	5	(Bulgaria) Borislav Stoychev	(yellow card) 26'
MF	27	(France) Igor Djoman
FW	7	(Bulgaria) Georgi Andonov (c)	(yellow card) 79'	(substituted off) 85'
MF	8	(Portugal) Alberto Louzeiro	(yellow card) 51'
MF	21	(Brazil) Elias
MF	29	(Portugal) Élio Martins		(substituted off) 64'
MF	88	(Portugal) David Caiado	(yellow card) 45+3'
Substitutes:
GK	1	(Bulgaria) Teodor Skorchev
DF	6	(Bulgaria) Ivo Ivanov		(substituted in) 85'
MF	11	(Bulgaria) Doncho Atanasov
DF	15	(Bulgaria) Georgi Dinkov
FW	70	(Mozambique) Jerry Sitoe		(substituted in) 64'
MF	71	(Algeria) Amir Sayoud	(yellow card) 107'	(substituted in) 93'
DF	77	(Portugal) Pedro Eugénio
Manager:
(Bulgaria) Petar Houbchev

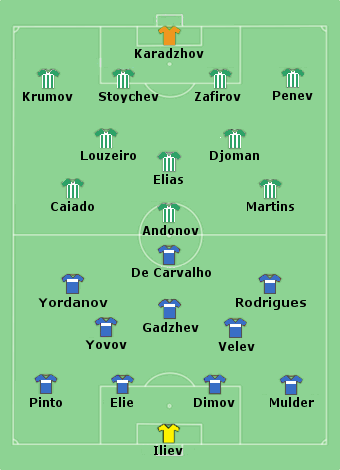

GK	23	(Bulgaria) Plamen Iliev
DF	2	(Netherlands) Dustley Mulder
DF	3	(France) Romain Élie
DF	28	(Portugal) Nuno Pinto	(yellow card) 67'
DF	25	(Bulgaria) Daniel Dimov
MF	45	(Bulgaria) Vladimir Gadzhev		(substituted off) 60'
MF	77	(Bulgaria) Stefan Velev
MF	22	(Bulgaria) Iliyan Yordanov		(substituted off) 74'
FW	19	(Guinea-Bissau) Basile de Carvalho	(yellow card) 82'	(substituted off) 91'
MF	10	(Bulgaria) Hristo Yovov (c)	(yellow card) 19' (yellow-red card) 44'
MF	11	(Cape Verde) Garry Rodrigues
Substitutes:
GK	89	(Bulgaria) Mihail Ivanov
MF	4	(Bulgaria) Stanislav Angelov		(substituted in) 91'
DF	6	(Bulgaria) Orlin Starokin
FW	9	(Portugal) João Silva		(substituted in) 74'
DF	13	(Bulgaria) Dimitar Vezalov
MF	16	(Portugal) Cristóvão Ramos		(substituted in) 60'
MF	29	(Slovenia) Rene Mihelič
Manager:
(Bulgaria) Nikolay Mitov

MAN OF THE MATCH

MATCH OFFICIALS

- Assistant referees:
  - Diyan Valkov
  - Plamen Hadzhiyski
- Fourth official: Radan Miryanov

MATCH RULES

- 90 minutes.
- 30 minutes of extra-time if necessary.
- Penalty shoot-out if scores still level.
- Seven named substitutes.
- Maximum of three substitutions.

== See also ==
- 2012–13 A Group
