= Zapryanov =

Zapryanov (Bulgarian: Запрянов) is a Bulgarian surname. Notable people with the surname include:

- Dimitar Zapryanov (1960–2024), Bulgarian judoka
- Petar Zapryanov (born 1959), Bulgarian sports shooter
- Zapryan Zapryanov (born 1994), Bulgarian footballer
