= Nikolay Domakinov =

Bulgarian football defender

Personal information
- Full name: Nikolay Mihaylov Domakinov
- Date of birth: 11 July 1980 (age 46)
- Place of birth: Plovdiv, Bulgaria
- Height: 1.87 m (6 ft 1 1/2 in)
- Position: Centre back

Team information
- Current team: Sekirovo (manager)

Senior career*
Years	Team	Apps	(Gls)
2001–2006	Botev Plovdiv	99	(4)
2007–2010	Cherno More	51	(2)
2011	Montana	10	(1)
2011–2012	Botev Plovdiv	14	(0)
2012–2013	Rakovski	20	(0)
2013	Oborishte	4	(0)
2014	Sozopol	16	(2)
2014	Rakovski	4	(0)
2015	Sozopol	2	(0)
2016–2018	Atletik Kuklen		

International career
2005	Bulgaria	2	(0)

Managerial career
- 2022–2023: Levski Karlovo
- 2023–: Sekirovo
- * Club domestic league appearances and goals as of 28 June 2015

Nikolay Domakinov (Bulgarian: Николай Домакинов; born 11 July 1980) is a Bulgarian retired footballer who played as a defender, and now manager, currently working at Sekirovo.

== International career ==
Domakinov played in two matches on the Bulgaria national football team in 2005 - with Ecuador and Mexico. At the time he participated in the tour of the Bulgaria national football team in North America.

Nikolay Domakinov: International Matches
#	Date	Venue	Opponent	Result	Competition
1.	16 November 2005	Houston, United States	Mexico	3-0 (win)	Friendly
2.	12 December 2005	New York City, United States	Ecuador	0-3 (loss)	Friendly
