= 2013 Bulgarian Supercup =

Финал за Суперкупата на България 2013
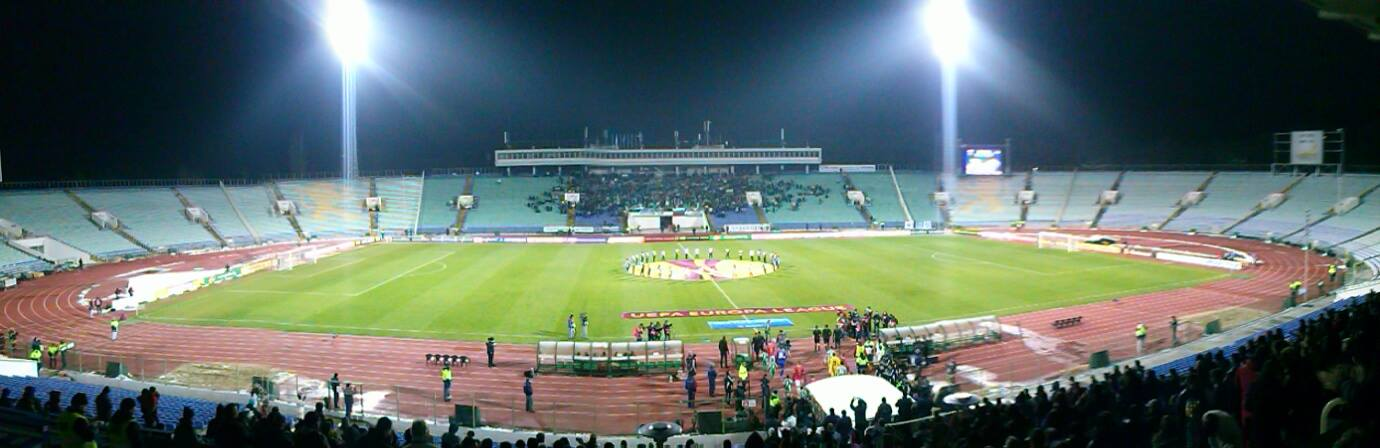
Ludogorets	Beroe
A Group	Bulgarian Cup
1	1
- Beroe won 5–3 on penalties
- Date: 10 July 2013
- Venue: Vasil Levski National Stadium, Sofia
- Referee: Georgi Yordanov (Gabrovo)
- Attendance: 1,200

The 2013 Bulgarian Supercup was played on 10 July 2013 at Vasil Levski National Stadium in Sofia, between the winners of the previous season's A group and Bulgarian Cup competitions. The match was contested by the champions of the 2012–13 A PFG, Ludogorets Razgrad, and the 2013 Bulgarian Cup winners, Beroe Stara Zagora.

This was the second Supercup final for both teams with Ludogorets winning their first one against Lokomotiv Plovdiv in 2012 and Beroe losing to Litex Lovech in 2010 after extra time. Beroe won their first ever Supercup after defeating Ludogorets on penalties.

== Match details ==
10 July 2013
20:30 EET

Ludogorets Razgrad	1−1	Beroe
Dyakov 45+2'		Hristov 27'
Penalties
Platini (penalty scored); Zlatinski (penalty scored); Marcelinho (penalty missed); Stoyanov (penalty scored)	3–5	(penalty scored) Andonov; (penalty scored) Ivanov; (penalty scored) Hristov; (penalty scored) Krumov; (penalty scored) Elias

Vasil Levski National Stadium, Sofia
Attendance: 1,200
Referee: Georgi Yordanov (Gabrovo)

Ludogorets	Beroe

GK	21	(Bulgaria) Vladislav Stoyanov	(yellow card) 59'
DF	80	(Brazil) Júnior Caiçara
DF	4	(Finland) Tero Mäntylä	(yellow card) 78'
DF	77	(Portugal) Vitinha		(substituted off) 69'
DF	27	(Romania) Cosmin Moți	(yellow card) 43'	(substituted off) 82'
MF	18	(Bulgaria) Svetoslav Dyakov (c)	(yellow card) 50' (yellow-red card) 59'
MF	8	(Portugal) Fábio Espinho
MF	22	(Bulgaria) Miroslav Ivanov	(yellow card) 36'	(substituted off) 56'
MF	73	(Bulgaria) Ivan Stoyanov
MF	84	(Brazil) Marcelinho	(yellow card) 53'
FW	99	(Brazil) Michel Platini
Substitutes:
GK	91	(Bulgaria) Ivan Čvorović
DF	5	(France) Alexandre Barthe		(substituted in) 82'
DF	25	(Bulgaria) Yordan Minev		(substituted in) 69'
MF	10	(Colombia) Sebastián Hernández
MF	17	(Spain) Dani Abalo
MF	23	(Bulgaria) Hristo Zlatinski		(substituted in) 56'
FW	9	(Slovenia) Roman Bezjak
Manager:
(Bulgaria) Ivaylo Petev

GK	12	(Bulgaria) Ivan Karadzhov
DF	17	(Bulgaria) Plamen Krumov
DF	3	(Bulgaria) Vladimir Zafirov
DF	28	(Bulgaria) Veselin Penev
DF	5	(Bulgaria) Borislav Stoychev	(yellow card) 51' (yellow-red card) 65'
MF	21	(Brazil) Elias
MF	27	(France) Igor Djoman	(yellow card) 61'
MF	2	(Bulgaria) Zdravko Iliev	(yellow card) 17'	(substituted off) 89'
MF	88	(Portugal) David Caiado	(yellow card) 37'	(substituted off) 37'
MF	7	(Bulgaria) Georgi Andonov (c)
MF	10	(Bulgaria) Ventsislav Hristov
Substitutes:
GK	22	(Bulgaria) Blagoy Makendzhiev
DF	6	(Bulgaria) Ivo Ivanov		(substituted in) 69'
DF	77	(Portugal) Pedro Eugénio
MF	19	(Bulgaria) Martin Raynov
MF	91	(Algeria) Amir Sayoud
MF	92	(Bulgaria) Ivan Goranov		(substituted in) 89'
FW	70	(Mozambique) Jerry Sitoe
Manager:
(Bulgaria) Petar Houbchev

MATCH OFFICIALS

- Assistant referees:
  - Veselin Mishev (Sofia)
  - Nikolay Petrov (Gabrovo)
- Fourth official: Nikola Popov (Sofia)

MATCH RULES

- 90 minutes.
- Penalty shoot-out if scores still level.
- Seven named substitutes.
- Maximum of five substitutions.
