= Ivo Ivanov (footballer, born March 1985) =

Bulgarian footballer

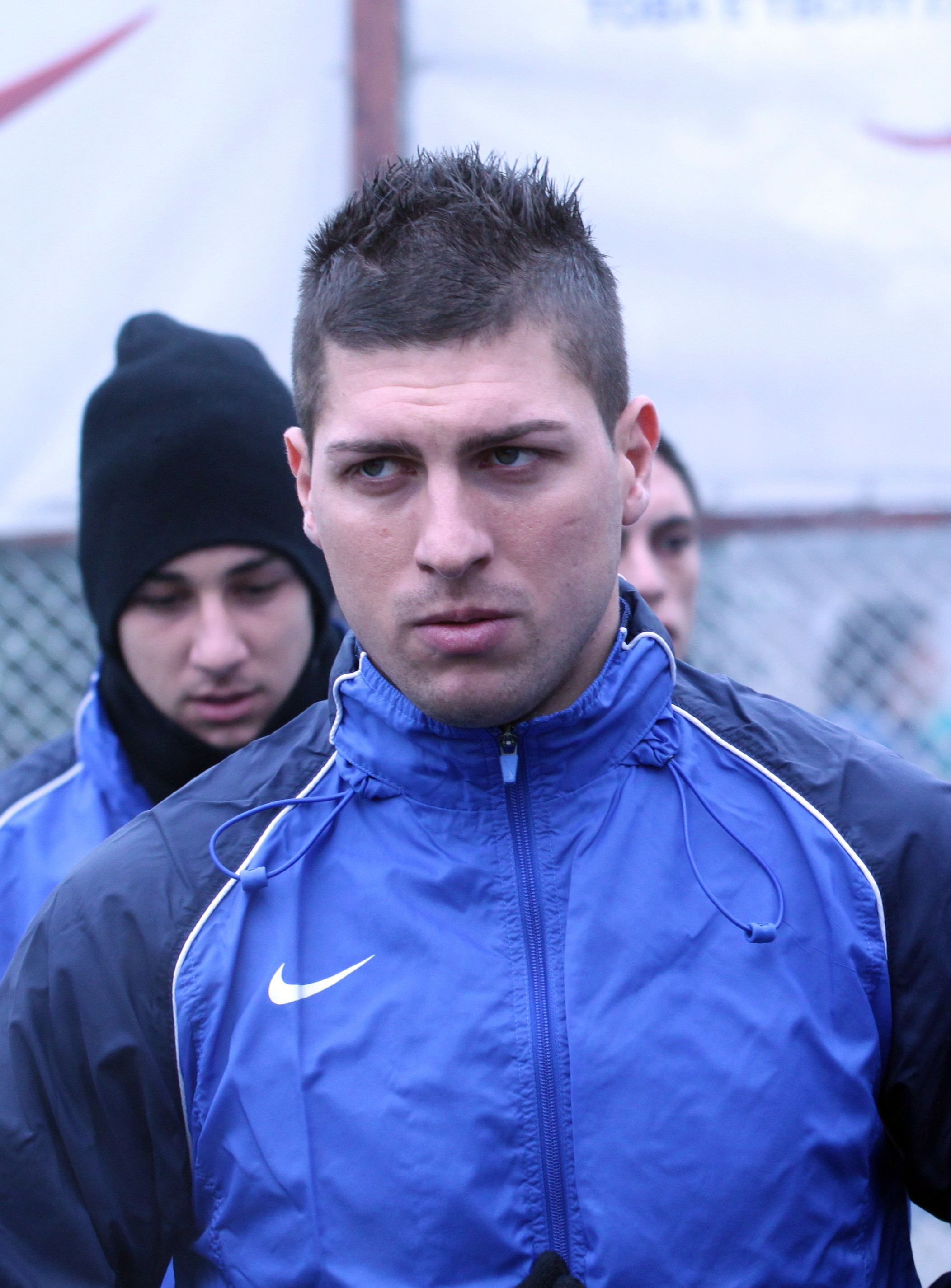

Personal information
- Full name: Ivo Ivanov Ivanov
- Date of birth: 11 March 1985 (age 41)
- Place of birth: Kazanlak, Bulgaria
- Height: 1.85 m (6 ft 1 in)
- Position: Centre back

Team information
- Current team: Rozova Dolina Kazanlak
- Number: 6

Youth career
- 1999–2003: Beroe

Senior career*
Years	Team	Apps	(Gls)
2003–2010	Beroe	107	(9)
2010–2012	Levski Sofia	33	(1)
2012–2017	Beroe	130	(4)
2017–2019	Vereya	37	(0)
2019	Spartak Varna	15	(0)
2020	Levski Karlovo	0	(0)
2020–	Rozova Dolina Kazanlak	149	(0)

International career
2009–2016	Bulgaria	6	(0)
- * Club domestic league appearances and goals as of 11:36, 11 March 2025 (UTC)

Ivo Ivanov Ivanov (Bulgarian: Иво Иванов; born 11 March 1985) is a Bulgarian football defender who currently plays for Rozova Dolina Kazanlak.

== Career ==
=== Beroe ===
Ivanov began his career in Beroe and made his debut in the 2003–04 season. On 6 May 2010, Beroe won the Bulgarian Cup, beating Chernomorets Pomorie in the final. Ivanov played through the whole match. On 18 October 2009, he scored the only goal in a 1–0 away league win over Levski Sofia.

=== Levski Sofia ===
After playing seven seasons for Beroe, Ivanov signed a three-year deal with Levski Sofia for a fee of around €100 000 on 8 June 2010. He made his unofficial debut for Levski in a pre-season friendly match against Târgu Mureş on 30 June, entering the match as a substitute.

Ivanov made his competitive debut for Levski in a match against Dundalk - a second qualifying round for Europa League. Levski won the first match and the result was 6–0. In Europa League match against Lille held on 4 November 2010, Levski was leading 2–1 until Ivo Ivanov scored an own goal shortly before the conclusion of the game to make it 2–2. On 17 April 2011, Ivanov scored the winning goal against Cherno More Varna in an A PFG match.

=== Return to Beroe ===
On 31 July 2012, Ivanov re-joined Beroe as part of a player exchange deal sending Dimitar Vezalov to Levski Sofia.

After the departure of Georgi Andonov from Beroe in August 2014, Ivanov was named as his replacement as club captain. On 20 January 2015, he signed a two-year contract extension, keeping him at Beroe until 2017. In May 2017, he left the club after his contract expired.

=== Vereya ===
On 19 June 2017, Ivanov made the short trip across Stara Zagora, signing with Vereya.

== International ==
On 18 November 2009, Ivo Ivanov made his debut for the national team after coming on as a substitute in the 84th minute for Blagoy Georgiev in the 4:1 away win against Malta in a friendly match. He earned his second cap on 10 October 2015, in the 0:3 away loss against Croatia in a Euro 2016 qualifier.

== Honours ==
=== Club ===
Beroe

- Bulgarian Cup (2): 2009–2010, 2012–13
- Bulgarian Supercup (1): 2013
- East B PFG (1): 2008-09

== Career statistics ==
As of 20 January 2018

Club	Season	League		Cup		Europe		Total	
Club	Season	Apps	Goals	Apps	Goals	Apps	Goals	Apps	Goals
Beroe Stara Zagora	2009–10	25	4	3	0	0	0	28	4
Levski Sofia	2010–11	20	1	2	0	11	0	33	1
Levski Sofia	2011–12	13	0	1	0	0	0	14	0
Levski Sofia	2012–13	0	0	0	0	2	0	2	0
Beroe Stara Zagora	2012–13	18	0	3	0	0	0	21	0
Beroe Stara Zagora	2013–14	27	0	3	1	1	0	31	1
Beroe Stara Zagora	2014–15	29	2	3	0	0	0	32	2
Beroe Stara Zagora	2015–16	31	1	3	0	4	0	38	1
Beroe Stara Zagora	2016–17	25	1	0	0	3	0	28	1
Vereya Stara Zagora	2017–18	3	0	0	0	0	0	3	0
Career totals		191	9	18	1	21	0	230	10
