= Mihail Ivanov =

Bulgarian footballer

Personal information
- Full name: Mihail Aleksandrov Ivanov
- Date of birth: 7 August 1989 (age 37)
- Place of birth: Sofia, Bulgaria
- Height: 1.85 m (6 ft 1 in)
- Position: Goalkeeper

Youth career
- 1996–2004: Levski Sofia
- 2004–2006: Renato Curi
- 2006–2009: Siena

Senior career*
Years	Team	Apps	(Gls)
2009–2012	Siena	0	(0)
2010–2011	→ Foggia (loan)	16	(0)
2012	→ Piacenza (loan)	16	(0)
2012	Botev Vratsa	11	(0)
2013–2014	Levski Sofia	2	(0)
2014–2015	Botev Plovdiv	10	(0)
2016	Vitosha Bistritsa	14	(0)
2016–2017	Robur Siena	2	(0)
2017–2018	Vitosha Bistritsa	12	(0)
2018–2019	AFC Eskilstuna	5	(0)
2020–2021	Tsarsko Selo	5	(0)

International career
2013	Bulgaria	1	(0)
- * Club domestic league appearances and goals as of 13 October 2021

Mihail Ivanov (Bulgarian: Михаил Иванов; born 7 August 1989) is a Bulgarian footballer who most recently played as a goalkeeper for Tsarsko Selo Sofia.

== Club career ==
Ivanov began his career at Levski Sofia. In 2004 the friends of his parents make contact with Academy Renato Curi and on 15-years old Mihail travelled alone to Italy.

In 2006 Ivanov moved to the youth squads of Siena. He played two years for Siena in Campionato Nazionale Primavera and was named the best goalkeeper for 2008–09 season. His first involvement in the first team was after being named on the bench for Siena's game against Palermo on 10 May 2009, which finished 1–0 in favour of Siena.

On 16 August 2010, Ivanov joined Foggia on loan until the end of the 2010–11 season. He made his competitive debut on 22 August, in a 3–0 away win against Cavese 1919. Ivanov earned 16 appearances in the Lega Pro Prima Divisione and kept five clean sheets during the season.

In June 2011 he returned to Siena as fourth choice behind Željko Brkić, Gianluca Pegolo and Simone Farelli. A loan to Atletico Roma F.C. was collapsed. On 17 January 2012, Piacenza confirmed Ivanov has joined on loan until the end of the season. He made his debut two weeks later, in a 1–0 away win over Cremonese.

After his contract with Siena expired in June 2012, Ivanov joined Botev Vratsa on a free transfer on 30 August. On 15 September, he made his A PFG debut against CSKA Sofia in a 3–0 away loss.

=== Botev Plovdiv ===
On 9 July 2014, Ivanov signed a two-year contract as a free agent with Botev Plovdiv. He made his debut on 20 July and kept a clean sheet during the 1–0 win over Lokomotiv Sofia. On 23 September, he kept a clean sheet again this time during the 0–4 away win over Lokomotiv Mezdra in the first round of the Bulgarian Cup.

After a long absence from the starting lineup, on 11 May 2015, Mihail Ivanov played 90 minutes during the 0–1 loss from Litex Lovech. Five days later, on 16 May, Ivanov was again in the starting lineup during the 3–2 win over CSKA Sofia. In the next round, on 23 May, Ivanov conceded two goals during 1–2 away defeat from Beroe Stara Zagora.

== International career ==
Ivanov was called up to the Bulgaria U-21 team, but has not appeared in any official games. He was nominated for the first time for the senior national team in May 2013, for friendly matches against Japan and Kazakhstan. He was an unused substitute over the course of the first match and earned his first cap on 4 June 2013, coming on as a replacement for Plamen Iliev during the second half of a 2:1 win.

== Career statistics ==
As of 4 June 2015

Club	Season	League		Cup		Continental		Total	
Club	Season	Apps	Goals	Apps	Goals	Apps	Goals	Apps	Goals
Siena	2008–09	0	0	0	0	–	–	0	0
Siena	2009–10	0	0	0	0	–	–	0	0
Foggia (loan)	2010–11	16	0	0	0	–	–	16	0
Siena	2011–12	0	0	0	0	–	–	0	0
Piacenza (loan)	2011–12	14	0	0	0	–	–	14	0
Botev Vratsa	2012–13	11	0	0	0	–	–	11	0
Levski Sofia	2012–13	2	0	2	0	–	–	4	0
Levski Sofia	2013–14	0	0	0	0	0	0	0	0
Botev Plovdiv	2014–15	8	0	1	0	0	0	9	0
Botev Plovdiv	2015–16	2	0	0	0	-	-	2	0
Total		51	0	3	0	0	0	54	0
