= Nikolay Marinov =

Bulgarian footballer

Personal information
- Full name: Nikolay Petrov Marinov
- Date of birth: 13 August 1986 (age 40)
- Place of birth: Bulgaria
- Height: 1.79 m (5 ft 10 1/2 in)
- Positions: Left back; midfielder

Youth career
- CSKA Sofia

Senior career*
Years	Team	Apps	(Gls)
2005–2006	Sliven 2000	4	(0)
2006–2007	AEZ Zakakiou		
2007–2008	CD Toledo		
2009	Beroe Stara Zagora	0	(0)
2009	Sportist Svoge	13	(0)
2011	Akademik Sofia	6	(1)
2012–2013	Botev Vratsa	29	(1)
- * Club domestic league appearances and goals as of 28 May 2013

Nikolay Marinov (Bulgarian: Николай Маринов; born 13 August 1986) is a Bulgarian football player, who plays as a midfielder.
