= Nuno Pinto =

Portuguese footballer

Personal information
- Full name: Nuno Miguel Sousa Pinto
- Date of birth: 6 August 1986 (age 40)
- Place of birth: Vila Nova de Gaia, Portugal
- Height: 1.76 m (5 ft 9 in)
- Position: Left-back

Team information
- Current team: Pinhalnovense (manager)

Youth career
- 1994–1997: Vilanovense
- 1997–1999: Boavista
- 1999–2000: Pasteleira
- 2000–2001: Boavista
- 2001–2002: Pasteleira
- 2002–2003: Boavista
- 2004: Candal
- 2004–2005: Boavista

Senior career*
Years	Team	Apps	(Gls)
2005–2008	Boavista	7	(0)
2005–2006	→ Vilanovense (loan)		
2007–2008	→ Trofense (loan)	22	(2)
2008–2011	Nacional	54	(1)
2011–2013	Levski Sofia	50	(0)
2014	Tavriya Simferopol	8	(0)
2015	Astra Giurgiu	7	(0)
2015–2022	Vitória Setúbal	156	(2)
Total		304	(5)

Managerial career
- 2022: Olímpico Montijo
- 2023: Olímpico Montijo
- 2023: Serpa
- 2024–: Pinhalnovense
- * Club domestic league appearances and goals

Nuno Miguel Sousa Pinto (born 6 August 1986) is a Portuguese former professional footballer who played as a left-back, currently manager of Pinhalnovense.

== Playing career ==
=== Early career ===
Born in Vila Nova de Gaia, Porto District, Pinto emerged through local Boavista FC's youth system. Whilst under contract, he spent two seasons on loan in the lower leagues, including 2007–08 with C.D. Trofense in the Segunda Liga, starting in all the games he appeared in and scoring twice as the club was promoted to the Primeira Liga for the first time ever.

Pinto signed for C.D. Nacional in the summer of 2008, appearing in only seven league matches in his first year (12 overall) with the Madeira side. He was more regularly played the following campaigns, and scored his first top-division goal on 6 December 2010 to conclude a 2–1 home comeback win over Associação Naval 1º de Maio.

=== Abroad ===
On 28 December 2011, Pinto completed a move to PFC Levski Sofia in the First Professional Football League (Bulgaria) for an undisclosed free. In 2012–13, the team were runners-up in the league to PFC Ludogorets Razgrad, and lost the cup final on penalties to PFC Beroe Stara Zagora after a 3–3 draw.

From January 2014 to June 2015 Pinto also competed abroad, with SC Tavriya Simferopol (Ukrainian Premier League) and FC Astra Giurgiu (Romanian Liga I), moving to the latter club due to the war in Crimea.

=== Vitória Setúbal ===
Pinto returned to Portugal on 3 July 2015, signing a two-year contract with Vitória de Setúbal, subsequently extended until 2020. He scored his only competitive goal for the club on 25 August 2017, netting from a free kick in a 1–1 away draw against C.F. Os Belenenses.

Pinto was handed a three-match ban in August 2018, for allegedly threatening the officials with bodily harm at the end of a league fixture against Nacional. On 16 December of the same year, the 32-year-old announced he was going to interrupt his career to undergo treatment for a lymphoma in his inguinal region. He returned for the final game of the season on 19 May 2019 at home to Rio Ave FC; with the team's top-flight survival already guaranteed, Sandro Mendes let him play for the first minutes.

In October 2020, with Vitória having just been relegated to the third division due to irregularities, Pinto agreed to a new deal at the Estádio do Bonfim.

== Coaching career ==
Pinto started working as a manager in July 2022, being appointed at amateurs Clube Olímpico do Montijo. Four months later, in spite of collecting 11 wins in 15 games and standing second in the table, he was dismissed; he was recalled by the board of directors in March 2023.

On 24 May 2023, Pinto signed with fourth-tier club FC Serpa. On 11 September, having suffered three losses in the league and achieved a win in the Taça de Portugal, he left by mutual agreement.

Pinto returned to the Setúbal Football Association in November 2024, with C.D. Pinhalnovense.
