= Iliyan Yordanov =

Bulgarian footballer

Personal information
- Full name: Iliyan Yordanov Yordanov
- Date of birth: 3 April 1989 (age 37)
- Place of birth: Zvanichevo, Bulgaria
- Height: 1.76 m (5 ft 9 in)
- Position: Winger

Team information
- Current team: Sekirovo
- Number: 88

Youth career
- Botev Plovdiv

Senior career*
Years	Team	Apps	(Gls)
2008–2010	Botev Plovdiv	10	(1)
2010–2011	Lyubimets 2007	36	(2)
2012	Lokomotiv Plovdiv	14	(0)
2013	Levski Sofia	32	(6)
2014–2015	Denizlispor	36	(8)
2015	Lokomotiv Plovdiv	4	(0)
2016	Borac Čačak	3	(0)
2016–2018	Vereya	51	(3)
2018–2019	Tsarsko Selo	22	(4)
2020	Maritsa Plovdiv	2	(0)
2020	Vitosha Bistritsa	5	(0)
2020–2021	Neftochimic	7	(0)
2021–2024	Maritsa Plovdiv	59	(1)
2024–2025	Sekirovo	31	(7)
2025	Spartak Plovdiv	16	(3)
2026–	Sekirovo	0	(0)
- * Club domestic league appearances and goals as of 5 January 2026

Iliyan Yordanov (Bulgarian: Илиян Йорданов; born 3 April 1989) is a Bulgarian professional footballer who plays as a winger for Sekirovo.

== Career ==
Yordanov started his career at Botev Plovdiv but left when the club went bankrupt in the early 2010 and subsequently joined Lyubimets 2007. During his career he also played abroad, first with Turkish side Denizlispor and then with Serbian side Borac Čačak.

== Honours ==
Tsarsko Selo Sofia

- Bulgarian Second League: 2018–19

Lokomotiv Plovdiv

- Bulgarian Cup runner-up: 2012
- Bulgarian Supercup: 2012

Levski Sofia

- Bulgarian Cup runner-up: 2013
