= FC Sekirovo =

Sekirovo Rakovski
- Full name: Football Club Sekirovo Rakovski
- Founded: 1954; 72 years ago 1991; 35 years ago
- Ground: Parchevich Stadium, Rakovski
- Capacity: 1,500
- Chairman: Stefan Pensov
- Manager: Nikolay Domakinov
- League: Third League
- 2023–24: 14th
- Website: https://fcsekirovo.com/
Home colours	Away colours

FC Sekirovo (Bulgarian: ФК Секирово) is a Bulgarian association football club based in Rakovski, which competes in the Third League, the third division of the Bulgarian football league system. Sekirovo's home ground is the Petar Parchevich Stadium, which has a capacity of 1,500 spectators.

== History ==
In 1954 year Sekirovo village formed their first football team. From 1955 to 1975 the club's football team played in the district groups and later in the Northern District Group. In 1966, General Nikolaevo, Sekirovo and Parchevich villages were merged in a new town called Rakovski and later team was dissolved.

On July 7, 1991, the players from Sekirovo quarter reformed FC Sekirovo. Over the years, the team's coaches have been Tobia Momin, Geno Daimov, Ivan Kostov, Gancho Peev, Rumen Dimitrov, Georgi Razlozhki, Trifon Panchev, Zheko Dimitrov and others. In the 2022/2023 season, the team competed in the Regional Group - Plovdiv, and after the first phase was the leader in the ranking with 46 points after 15 wins, 1 draw and 2 losses, goal difference 82:17. Subsequently, matches from the Second Phase of the championship were played, in which the FC Rakovski (Sekirovo) team was again first in the final standings after 8 wins, 1 draw and only 1 loss, goal difference 31:6 and 25 points. In the first round of the qualifiers, FC Sekirovo faced Lyubimets from Haskovo region and won with the minimum score of 1:0. The next opponent was Arda II. The match was on June 7, 2023, and FC Sekirovo won 3:1 which granted them their historic promotion to Third League.

In September 2023 the team took Nikolay Domakinov, ex Bulgaria national player, as the new manager of the team. On 30 September they recorded their first win in Third League.

== Honours ==
- A RFG Plovdiv:
  - Winners (1): 2022–23

== Logo, shirt and sponsor ==
„Fratria" name comes from „Brotherhood", with the team having the sloagan „frater pro fratre", meaning „brother for brother", on their logo. Their main colors are red (bordo) and black and since 2021 their main sponsor is Berezka.

Period	Kit manufacturer	Shirt partner
2023–	(Bulgaria) IZI Sport	Insaoil

== Players ==
=== Current squad ===
As of 16 January 2024

Note: Flags indicate national team as defined under FIFA eligibility rules; some limited exceptions apply. Players may hold more than one non-FIFA nationality.

No.	Pos.	Nation	Player
1	GK	BUL	Yordan Kostadinov
2	DF	BUL	Yosif Tabakov
3	DF	BUL	Plamen Tabakov
4	DF	BUL	Georgi Yotovski
5	DF	BUL	Stanislav Vasilev
6	DF	BUL	Hristo Tsvetkov
7	FW	BUL	Nikola Lalev
8	MF	BUL	Zapryan Zapryanov
9	FW	BUL	Ivan Gendov
10	DF	BUL	Ventsislav Izevkov
11	MF	BUL	Yordan Madzharov
12	GK	BUL	Mario Belev
13	MF	BUL	Rangel Kordov
15	MF	BUL	Valentin Madzharski

No.	Pos.	Nation	Player
16	MF	BUL	Anton Marushkin
17	FW	BUL	Plamen Aylov
18	FW	BUL	Eray Karadayi
20	DF	BUL	Gabriel Zemyarski
—	DF	BUL	Avgustin Zanchev
—	DF	BUL	Plamen Koyurushki
—	MF	BUL	Iriney Aylov
—	MF	BUL	Martin Antonov
—	MF	BUL	Lyubomir Romanski
—	MF	BUL	Georgi Baldzhiyski
—	MF	BUL	Stefan Rabadzhiyski
—	FW	BUL	Petar Raykov
—	FW	BUL	Slavcho Shokolarov

=== Out on loan ===
Note: Flags indicate national team as defined under FIFA eligibility rules; some limited exceptions apply. Players may hold more than one non-FIFA nationality.

No.	Pos.	Nation	Player

== Personnel ==
=== Club officials ===
Position	Name	Nationality
Coaching staff
Head coach	Nikolay Domakinov	(Bulgaria)
Assistant coach	Velko Kotov	(Bulgaria)

== Past seasons ==
Results of league and cup competitions by season
Season	League											Bulgarian Cup	Other competitions		Top goalscorer	
Season	Division	Level	P	W	D	L	F	A	GD	Pts	Pos	Bulgarian Cup	Other competitions		Top goalscorer	
2012–13	A Regional Plovdiv	4	30	10	7	13	41	49	-8	37	11th	DNQ				
2013–14	A Regional Plovdiv	4	28	11	7	10	44	41	+3	40	6th	DNQ				
2014–15	A Regional Plovdiv	4	30	16	3	11	53	40	+13	51	5th	DNQ				
2015–16	A Regional Plovdiv	4	30	13	2	15	60	57	+3	41	7th	DNQ				
2016–17	A Regional Plovdiv	4	30	13	2	15	53	64	-11	41	10th	DNQ				
2017–18	A Regional Plovdiv	4	30	11	9	10	51	46	+5	42	7th	DNQ				
2018–19	A Regional Plovdiv	4	29	12	7	10	36	32	+4	43	8th	DNQ				
2019–20	A Regional Plovdiv	4	16	12	3	1	61	14	+47	39	3rd	DNQ				
2020–21	A Regional Plovdiv	4	32	16	6	10	91	42	+49	54	6th	DNQ				
2021–22	A Regional Plovdiv	4	30	20	3	7	83	37	+46	63	2nd	DNQ				
2022–23	A Regional Plovdiv	4	18	15	1	2	82	17	+65	46	1st ↑	DNQ	Cup of AFL	R1		
2023–24	Third League	3	38	11	7	20	59	75	-16	40	14th	DNQ	Cup of AFL	R1	(Bulgaria) Yosif Tabakov	12
2024–25	Third League	3										TBA	Cup of AFL			

=== Key ===
- GS = Group stage
- QF = Quarter-finals
- SF = Semi-finals

Champions	Runners-up	Promoted	Relegated
