= Jean-Baptiste Yakassongo =

Belgian footballer (born 1989)

Personal information
- Full name: Jean-Baptiste N'Goy Yakassongo
- Date of birth: 20 March 1989 (age 37)
- Place of birth: Kinshasa, Zaire
- Height: 1.73 m (5 ft 8 in)
- Position: Winger

Team information
- Current team: RES Acrenoise

Youth career
- 1999–2001: Mouscron
- 2001–2007: Anderlecht
- 2007–2008: Mouscron

Senior career*
Years	Team	Apps	(Gls)
2008–2010	Mouscron	1	(0)
2010–2012	R. Géants Athois	31	(6)
2013	Minyor Pernik	11	(0)
2013–2014	Lokomotiv Sofia	7	(0)
2014–2015	R. Géants Athois	14	(1)
2015–2017	RES Acrenoise	28	(2)
2021–2022	JS Isièroise	2	(0)
Total		94	(9)
- * Club domestic league appearances and goals as of 22 December 2015

Jean-Baptiste N'Goy Yakassongo (born 20 March 1989) was a Belgian footballer who plays as a winger for RES Acrenoise.

== Career ==
Born in Kinshasa, he made one appearance in the Belgian First Division for Mouscron.
