= João Silva (footballer, born 1990) =

Portuguese footballer

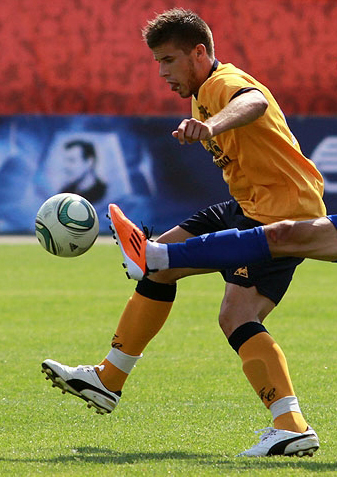
- Silva training with Everton in 2011

Personal information
- Full name: João Pedro Pereira Silva
- Date of birth: 21 May 1990 (age 36)
- Place of birth: Vila das Aves, Portugal
- Height: 1.89 m (6 ft 2 in)
- Position: Striker

Team information
- Current team: Lusitânia
- Number: 9

Youth career
- 1999–2009: Aves

Senior career*
Years	Team	Apps	(Gls)
2009–2010	Aves	30	(14)
2010–2012	Everton	0	(0)
2011	→ União Leiria (loan)	12	(4)
2011–2012	→ Vitória Setúbal (loan)	16	(3)
2012–2013	Levski Sofia	27	(7)
2013–2014	Bari	40	(6)
2014–2015	Palermo	1	(0)
2015–2016	Paços Ferreira	12	(0)
2016	Avellino	9	(1)
2016–2017	Salernitana	20	(0)
2017–2019	Feirense	55	(8)
2019–2020	Nantong Zhiyun	22	(3)
2021	Zibo Cuju	5	(2)
2021	Hebei	10	(0)
2022–2023	Estrela Amadora	29	(6)
2023	Ionikos	11	(2)
2024	Al-Ahli	?	(3)
2025	Felgueiras	14	(4)
2025–	Lusitânia	28	(4)

International career
2010	Portugal U20	3	(0)
2010–2011	Portugal U21	11	(3)
- * Club domestic league appearances and goals as of 23:12, 28 May 2026 (UTC)

João Pedro Pereira Silva (born 21 May 1990) is a Portuguese professional footballer who plays as a striker for Liga Portugal 2 club Lusitânia.

== Club career ==
Born in Vila das Aves, Santo Tirso, Silva joined the youth system of local C.D. Aves at the age of 10. He eventually made his professional debut for the club during the 2009–10 season, with the northerners in the Segunda Liga, and made an immediate impact by finishing as the league's second highest scorer with 14 goals as the team finished comfortably in mid-table.

Silva signed for Premier League side Everton on a three-year contract for an undisclosed fee, on 9 June 2010. In the last hours of the following transfer window, without having made any official appearances with the Toffees, he returned to Portugal, joining U.D. Leiria on loan. On 14 May 2011, the last matchday of the campaign, he scored two of his four goals in the Primeira Liga for the team, in a 3–3 away draw against S.L. Benfica.

For 2011–12, Silva continued on loan and in his country's top division, joining Vitória de Setúbal. He scored in his first competitive game, a 2–1 home win over F.C. Paços de Ferreira, netting in the 91st minute. On 31 January 2012, he was recalled from his loan.

On 9 July 2012, Silva joined PFC Levski Sofia on a three-year deal. He made his official debut ten days later, as a substitute in a UEFA Europa League qualifying match against FK Sarajevo.

Released by Levski in summer 2013, Silva took his game to Italy, where he represented A.S. Bari and U.S. Città di Palermo, the first club from Serie B and the second in the Serie A. He left the latter on 26 August 2015, signing a one-year contract with Paços de Ferreira the following day.

Silva returned to the Italian second tier in January 2016, remaining there until June 2017 in service of US Avellino 1912 and US Salernitana 1919. He moved back to his country subsequently, with C.D. Feirense. He scored only 13 competitive goals in a two-year spell, being relegated from the main division in 2019.

Silva competed in China the following years, with Nantong Zhiyun FC, Zibo Cuju FC (League One) and Hebei FC (Super League). He returned to Portugal in September 2022, with the 32-year-old signing a one-year deal with C.F. Estrela da Amadora. Having helped the side to return to the top flight, he left as a free agent.

On 12 September 2023, Silva joined Super League Greece 2 club Ionikos FC. He then had a brief spell in the Bahraini Premier League with Al-Ahli Club (Manama).

Silva subsequently returned to Portugal and its second division, where he had one-season stints with newly promoted F.C. Felgueiras and Lusitânia FC.

== International career ==
Silva won his first cap for the Portugal under-21 team on 18 May 2010 – three days shy of his 20th birthday – replacing Orlando Sá for the last 21 minutes of a 3–1 friendly win over the Netherlands played in Vila Real de Santo António.

== Career statistics ==
As of match played 19 December 2023

Appearances and goals by club, season and competition
Club	Season	League			National cup		League cup		Continental		Other		Total	
Club	Season	Division	Apps	Goals	Apps	Goals	Apps	Goals	Apps	Goals	Apps	Goals	Apps	Goals
Aves	2009–10	Liga de Honra	30	14	1	0	2	0	—		—		33	14
Everton	2010–11	Premier League	0	0	0	0	0	0	—		—		0	0
Everton	2011–12	Premier League	0	0	0	0	0	0	—		—		0	0
Everton	Total		0	0	0	0	0	0	—		—		0	0
União Leiria (loan)	2010–11	Primeira Liga	12	4	0	0	0	0	—		—		12	4
Vitória Setúbal (loan)	2011–12	Primeira Liga	16	3	1	0	4	1	—		—		21	4
Levski Sofia	2012–13	A Group	25	7	8	5	—		2 (Note: Appearances in UEFA Europa League)	0	—		35	12
Levski Sofia	2013–14	A Group	2	0	0	0	—		2	0	—		4	0
Levski Sofia	Total		27	7	8	5	—		4	0	—		39	12
Bari	2013–14	Serie B	40	6	0	0	—		—		3 (Note: Appearances in Serie B promotion play-offs)	2	43	8
Bari	2014–15	Serie B	0	0	2	0	—		—		—		2	0
Bari	Total		40	6	2	0	—		—		3	2	45	8
Palermo	2014–15	Serie A	1	0	0	0	—		—		—		1	0
Paços Ferreira	2015–16	Primeira Liga	12	0	1	0	1	1	—		—		14	1
Avellino	2015–16	Serie B	9	1	0	0	—		—		—		9	1
Salernitana	2016–17	Serie B	20	0	0	0	—		—		—		20	0
Feirense	2017–18	Primeira Liga	30	6	2	1	2	0	—		—		34	7
Feirense	2018–19	Primeira Liga	25	2	2	3	3	2	—		—		30	7
Feirense	Total		55	8	4	4	5	2	—		—		64	14
Nantong Zhiyun	2019	China League One	7	2	0	0	—		—		—		7	2
Nantong Zhiyun	2020	China League One	15	1	—		—		—		—		15	1
Nantong Zhiyun	Total		22	3	0	0	—		—		—		22	3
Zibo Cuju	2021	China League One	5	2	0	0	—		—		—		5	2
Hebei	2021	Chinese Super League	10	0	0	0	—		—		—		10	0
Estrela Amadora	2022–23	Liga Portugal 2	29	6	1	0	2	1	—		2 (Note: Appearances in Liga Portugal 2 promotion play-offs)	0	34	7
Ionikos	2023–24	Super League Greece 2	11	2	0	0	—		—		—		11	2
Career total			299	56	18	9	14	5	4	0	5	2	340	72
