= Basile de Carvalho =

Senegalese footballer (born 1981)

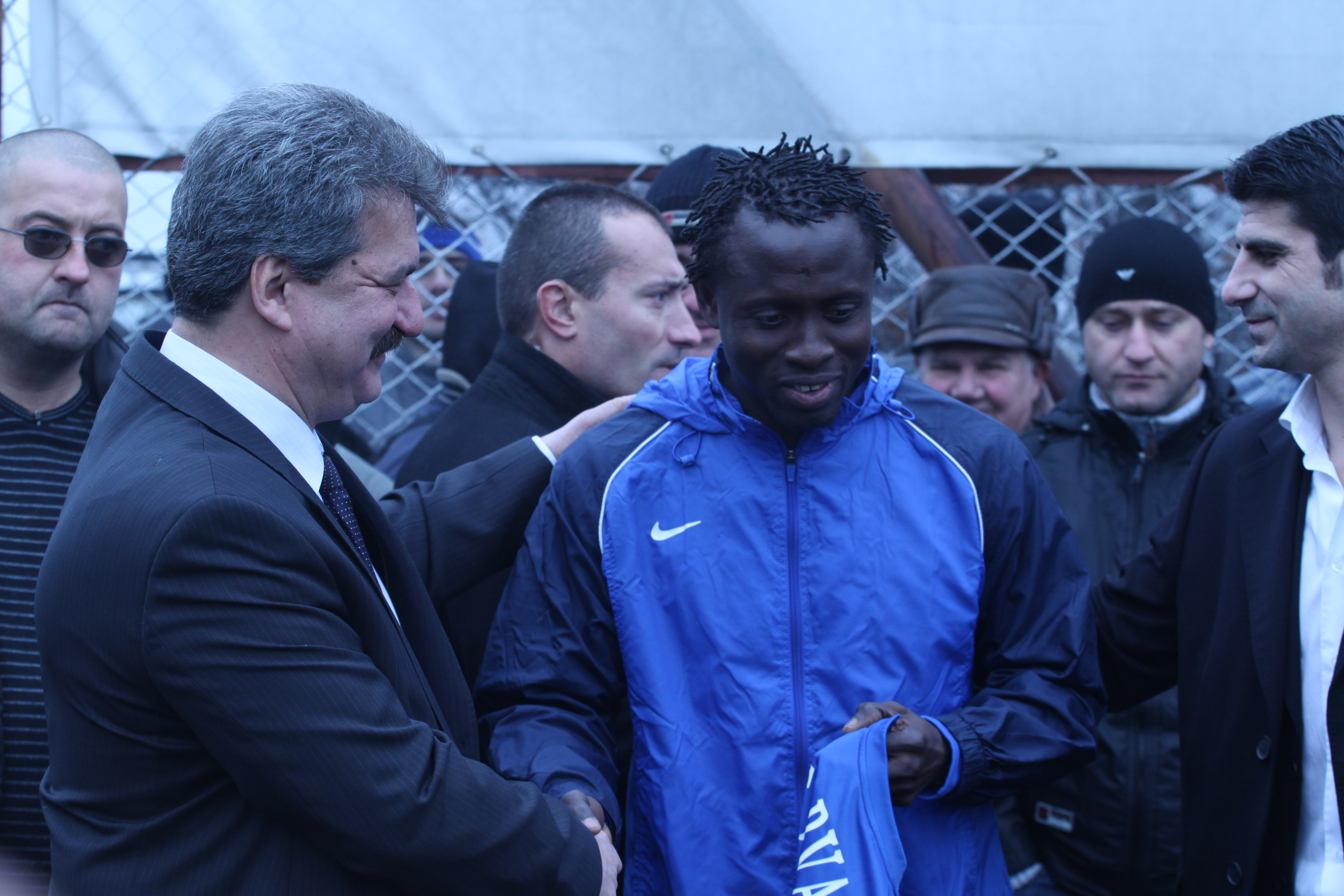
- De Carvalho while at Levski Sofia in 2011

Personal information
- Full name: Basile Salomon Pereira de Carvalho
- Date of birth: 31 October 1981 (age 45)
- Place of birth: Ziguinchor, Senegal
- Height: 1.83 m (6 ft 0 in)
- Position: Striker

Senior career*
Years	Team	Apps	(Gls)
1999–2000	Casa Sports	24	(12)
2001–2002	Louhans-Cuiseaux	39	(15)
2002–2004	Sochaux B	29	(15)
2002–2004	Sochaux	5	(0)
2003–2004	→ Sedan (loan)	27	(9)
2005–2010	Brest	109	(18)
2010	Strasbourg	15	(1)
2010–2012	Lokomotiv Plovdiv	38	(16)
2012–2013	Levski Sofia	25	(19)
2013–2014	White Star Bruxelles	28	(7)
2015	Interclube	5	(1)
2015–2019	Louhans-Cuiseaux	61	(29)
Total		405	(142)

International career
2011–2012	Guinea-Bissau	6	(2)
- * Club domestic league appearances and goals

Basile Salomon Pereira de Carvalho (born 31 October 1981) is a former professional footballer who played as a forward. Born in Senegal, he made six FIFA-official appearances for the Guinea-Bissau national team in 2011 and 2012, scoring twice.

== Club career ==
=== France ===
De Carvalho was born in Ziguinchor, Senegal. He joined the French club Louhans-Cuiseaux in 2000, and scored 15 goals in 38 games across two seasons there. Between 2002 and 2004, he played for Sochaux, with a one-year period out on loan to Sedan. De Carvalho then spent five years between 2005 and 2010 with Brest in Ligue 2 and Championnat National. In the beginning of 2010, he signed for Strasbourg in Championnat National, scoring once in 15 matches.

=== Lokomotiv Plovdiv ===
In 2010, De Carvalho joined Lokomotiv Plovdiv as a replacement for Garra Dembélé, who had just been sold to Levski Sofia. In six months there, he scored 7 goals in 13 matches. In January 2011, De Carvalho was close to being transferred to Levski Sofia, but the deal eventually fell through, purportedly due to his chronic shoulder problems. He continued to be a regular starter for Lokomotiv Plovdiv, when physically fit, during the 2011–12 season. On 15 March 2012, De Carvalho was sent off after an altercation with Hristo Yovov in the quarter-final of the Bulgarian Cup, which his team eventually won 2–1 after extra time.

=== Levski Sofia ===
On 12 June 2012, De Carvalho signed with Levski Sofia on a two-year deal. He made his competitive debut on 19 July, in a 1–0 home win over FK Sarajevo in a UEFA Europa League match, and scored his first goal (converting a penalty kick) in the return leg against the same opponent, which was lost by a score of 1–3.

On 28 November, Basile netted his first A Group hat-trick in a 7–1 home win against Etar 1924, scoring four goals. He became the first foreigner to score four goals in one match for Levski. He finished the 2012–13 A Group season as the top goalscorer in the league, having found the net 19 times in total. His European campaign was somewhat less successful, as he missed a penalty in the first leg of a UEFA Europa League match against Kazakh team Irtysh Pavlodar; his team was eventually eliminated 2–0 on aggregate.

=== White Star ===
On 20 July 2013, De Carvalho relocated to Belgium, signing a contract with second division club White Star Bruxelles. He made his official debut (as a starter) on 4 August 2013, scoring an equalizing goal in the 2–1 home win over Geel.

=== Inter Luanda ===
In July 2014, De Carvalho moved to Angola, signing a contract with top division club Inter Luanda.

=== Louhans-Cuiseaux ===
In January 2015, De Carvalho relocated to France, signing a contract with third division club Louhans-Cuiseaux, where he had started his career in Europe. In May 2019, he announced his retirement from football.

== International career ==
In September 2010, De Carvalho was called up to the national team of Guinea Bissau for the 2012 African Cup of Nations qualifiers. His debut came on 26 March 2011, in a 0–1 home loss against Uganda in a 2012 African Nations Cup qualifier. On 10 August 2011, he opened his account for the national side, scoring twice in the 4–1 win against Equatorial Guinea in a friendly match. These two goals are not considered official due to the nature of the friendly game and are not listed below. De Carvalho participated in Guinea-Bissau's qualifying campaign for the 2014 World Cup.

== Personal life ==
He holds French citizenship.

== Career statistics ==
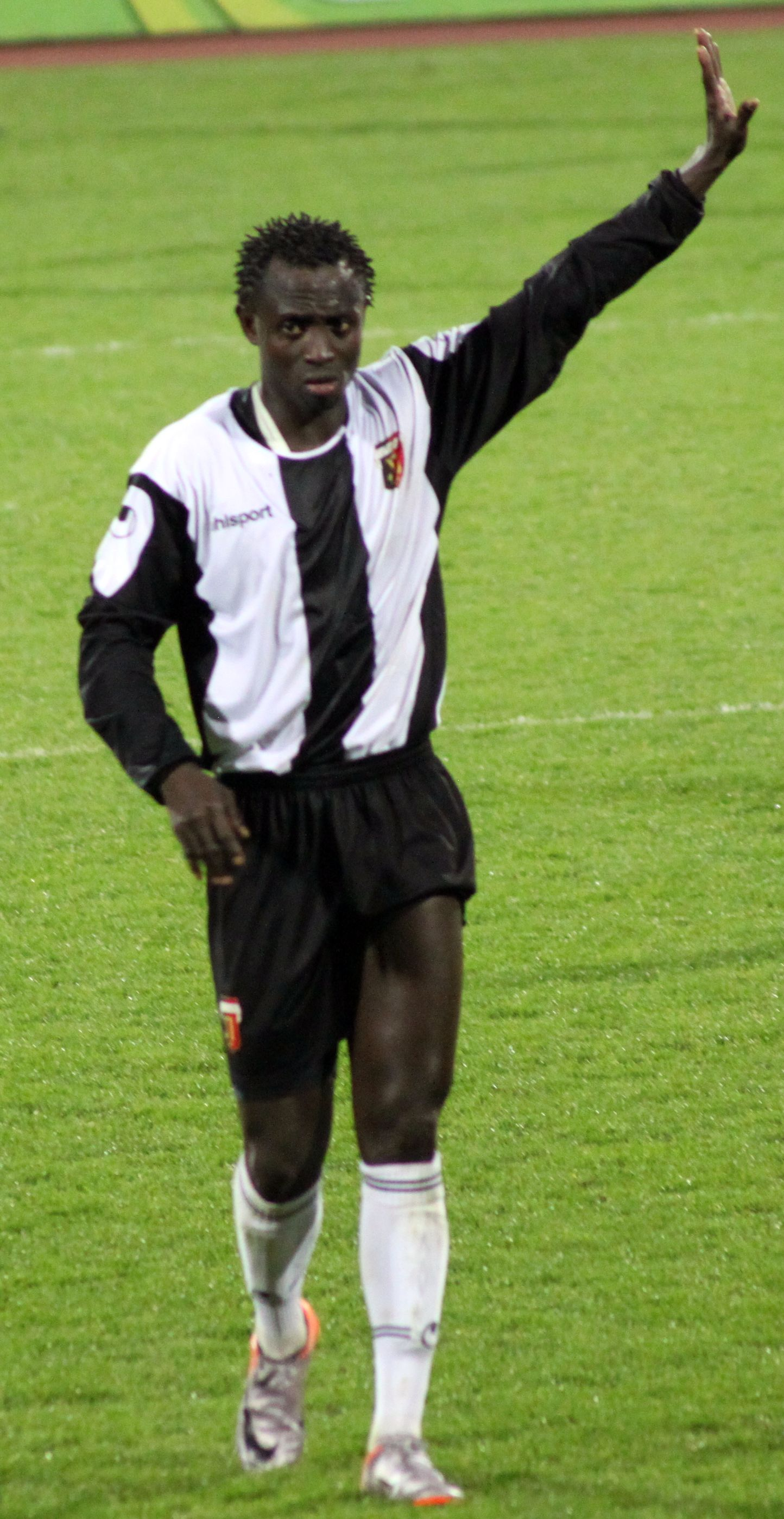
De Carvalho playing for Lokomotiv Plovdiv

=== Club ===
As of 28 November 2012.

Appearances and goals by club, season and competition
Club	Season	League		Cup		League Cup		Continental		Total	
Club	Season	Apps	Goals	Apps	Goals	Apps	Goals	Apps	Goals	Apps	Goals
Louhans-Cuiseaux	2000–01	12	3	0	0	0	0	–		12	3
Louhans-Cuiseaux	2001–02	27	12	0	0	1	0	–		28	12
Louhans-Cuiseaux	Total	39	15	0	0	1	0	–		40	15
Sochaux B	2002–03	23	8	0	0	0	0	–		23	8
Sochaux	2002–03	2	0	0	0	0	0	–		2	0
Sedan (loan)	2003–04	27	9	0	0	1	0	–		28	9
Sochaux	2004–05	3	0	0	0	2	0	–		5	0
Sochaux B	2004–05	6	7	0	0	0	0	–		6	7
Brest	2004–05	13	0	0	0	0	0	–		13	0
Brest	2005–06	11	0	0	0	0	0	–		11	0
Brest	2006–07	33	7	0	0	1	1	–		34	8
Brest	2007–08	32	5	3	1	2	1	–		37	7
Brest	2008–09	18	6	0	0	0	0	–		18	6
Brest	2009–10	2	0	2	1	0	0	–		4	1
Brest	Total	109	18	5	2	3	2	–		117	22
Strasbourg	2009–10	15	1	0	0	0	0	–		15	1
Lokomotiv Plovdiv	2010–11	20	10	3	0	–		–		23	10
Lokomotiv Plovdiv	2011–12	18	6	3	0	–		–		21	6
Lokomotiv Plovdiv	Total	38	16	6	0	–		–		44	16
Levski Sofia	2012–13	25	19	4	0	–		2	1	31	20
Levski Sofia	2013–14	0	0	0	0	–		2	0	2	0
Levski Sofia	Total	25	19	4	0	–		4	1	33	20
Career total		287	93	15	2	7	2	4	1	313	98

=== International goals ===
Scores and results list Guinea-Bissau's goal tally first, score column indicates score after each de Carvalho goal.

List of international goals scored by Basile de Carvalho
No.	Date	Venue	Opponent	Score	Result	Competition
1	3 September 2011	Kasarani Stadium, Nairobi, Kenya	Kenya	1–1	1–2	2012 Africa Cup of Nations qualification
2	11 November 2011	Estádio Lino Correia, Bissau, Guinea-Bissau	Togo	1–1	1–1	2014 FIFA World Cup qualification
