= Alberto Louzeiro =

Portuguese footballer

Personal information
- Full name: Alberto João Ferreira Louzeiro
- Date of birth: 22 November 1982 (age 43)
- Place of birth: Santiago do Cacém, Portugal
- Height: 1.74 m (5 ft 9 in)
- Position: Midfielder

Team information
- Current team: Sambrasense

Youth career
- 1994–1999: União Santiago
- 1999–2001: Farense

Senior career*
Years	Team	Apps	(Gls)
2001–2002	Padernense	38	(2)
2002–2003	Farense	1	(0)
2003–2004	Olhanense	17	(1)
2004–2005	Operário	37	(0)
2005–2008	Louletano	86	(10)
2008–2009	Chaves	3	(0)
2009–2012	Louletano	75	(4)
2012	Aris Limassol	15	(0)
2012–2013	Beroe Stara Zagora	23	(0)
2016–	Sambrasense		
- * Club domestic league appearances and goals as of 25 August 2013

Alberto João Ferreira Louzeiro (born 22 November 1982 in Santiago do Cacém) is a Portuguese footballer who plays for União Desportiva Recreativa Sambrasense as a defensive midfielder.

== Football career ==
In his first decade as a senior, Louzeiro played almost exclusively in the third division in his country, mainly representing Louletano D.C. and S.C. Olhanense. The sole exception to this was in the 2002–03 season, when he appeared in one game in the second level for another side in Algarve, S.C. Farense (25 minutes against S.C. Salgueiros, 0–2 away loss).

In late January 2012, aged nearly 30, Louzeiro moved abroad for the first time, signing for Aris Limassol F.C. in Cyprus. He made his First Division debut in a 0–1 home defeat to APOEL FC on the 21st, coming on as a substitute for Dušan Kerkez; after nine starts, his contract was terminated at the end of the campaign – which ended in relegation – by mutual consent.

Louzeiro joined Bulgaria's PFC Beroe Stara Zagora on 21 May 2012, on a two-year deal.

== Honours ==
Beroe

- Bulgarian Cup: 2012–13
- Bulgarian Supercup: 2013
