= Marcinho (footballer, born 25 March 1981) =

Brazilian footballer

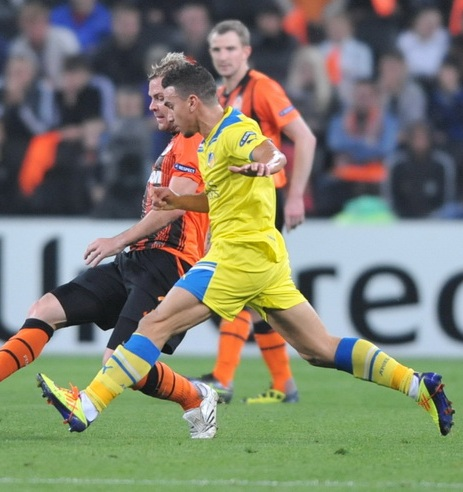
- Márcio Ivanildo da Silva, playing for Cajazeirense

Personal information
- Full name: Márcio Ivanildo da Silva
- Date of birth: 25 March 1981 (age 45)
- Place of birth: Petrolândia, Brazil
- Height: 1.74 m (5 ft 9 in)
- Position: Midfielder

Youth career
- Campo Limpo

Senior career*
Years	Team	Apps	(Gls)
2001–2003	São Caetano	0	(0)
2004–2005	CRB		
2004	→ Santos (loan)	28	(0)
2005–2009	Marítimo	140	(17)
2010–2012	APOEL	58	(9)
2012–2013	Levski Sofia	12	(3)
2013	→ ASA (loan)		
2013	Anorthosis	0	(0)
2014	Santa Rita		
2014	Atlético Sorocaba	9	(1)
2015	Murici	6	(0)
2016–2017	Botafogo-PB	31	(1)
2018	Campinense	9	(1)
2019	Cajazeirense	0	(0)
2019	AA Altos	6	(1)
2020	Cajazeirense	10	(0)
- * Club domestic league appearances and goals as of 11:41, 18 June 2019 (UTC)

Márcio Ivanildo da Silva (born 25 March 1981), known as Marcinho, is a Brazilian footballer an attacking midfielder.

== Club career ==
=== Brazil / Marítimo ===
In his country, Marcinho started playing for Campo Limpo and Associação Desportiva São Caetano. In January 2004 he joined Clube de Regatas Brasil and then was loaned out to Santos FC, with which he competed in the Série A in the 2004 season, starting in only three of his appearances but contributing relatively to the national championship conquest.

Marcinho arrived in Portugal in January 2005, signing with C.S. Marítimo. During his spell in Madeira he never appeared in less than 27 Primeira Liga games when playing complete seasons, his best output being six goals in 29 matches in 2008–09 as his team finished in ninth position; he also competed in that year's UEFA Cup, scoring in a 1–2 first round away loss against Valencia CF (1–3 on aggregate).

=== APOEL ===
In late December 2009 Marcinho signed with APOEL FC in the Cypriot First Division, amidst interest of French teams Le Mans Union Club 72 and Grenoble Foot 38. He netted seven times from 25 appearances in his first full campaign, as the Nicosia-based side won the national championship.

Marcinho appeared in 11 matches in the 2011–12 UEFA Champions League, in the club's surprising quarter-finals run in the competition. The 31-year-old was released in late May 2012, after his contract was not renewed.

=== Later years ===
On 19 June 2012, Marcinho signed for one year with PFC Levski Sofia in Bulgaria. On 14 June of the following year, he agreed to a one-year deal with Cyprus' Anorthosis Famagusta F.C.

== Honours ==
Santos

- Série A: 2004

APOEL

- Cypriot First Division: 2010–11
- Cypriot Super Cup: 2011

Botafogo-PB

- Campeonato Paraibano: 2017
