= Igor Djoman =

French footballer (born 1986)

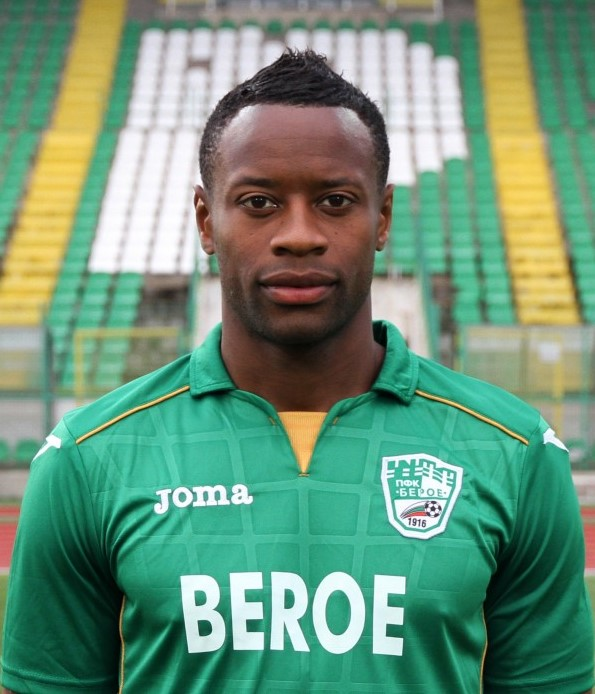
- Domain with Beroe Stara Zagora

Personal information
- Date of birth: 1 May 1986 (age 40)
- Place of birth: Clermont, France
- Height: 1.75 m (5 ft 9 in)
- Position: Midfielder

Youth career
- Amiens

Senior career*
Years	Team	Apps	(Gls)
2005–2010	Guingamp	50	(1)
2011–2012	Vendée Poiré-sur-Vie	29	(0)
2013–2016	Beroe Stara Zagora	93	(2)
2016–2017	Lokomotiv GO	24	(2)
2017–?	Gibraltar United		
2017–2019	Al-Tadamon SC		
- * Club domestic league appearances and goals

Igor Djoman (born 1 May 1986) is a French former professional footballer who played as a midfielder.

== Career ==
Djoman played one season for Amiens B, before spending six seasons with Guingamp, where he earned 43 appearances for the first team. He made his Ligue 2 debut in a 2–0 away loss against Sedan on 12 May 2006, coming on as a substitute. Djoman scored his only league goal for Guingamp on 29 September 2006, in a 3–1 home loss against Caen.

On 26 February 2013, Djoman signed with Bulgarian side Beroe Stara Zagora on a one-and-a-half-year deal. He made his debut in a 0–0 away draw against Botev Vratsa on 2 March.

In September 2017, Djoman joined Gibraltarian club Gibraltar United. He made his debut on 25 September in a 2–0 home win against Lynx, coming on as substitute for Jamie Bosio.

Djoman holds French and Ivorian nationalities.

== Career statistics ==
Appearances and goals by club, season and competition
Club	Season	League		National cup		League cup		Europe		Total	
Club	Season	Apps	Goals	Apps	Goals	Apps	Goals	Apps	Goals	Apps	Goals
Guingamp	2005–06	1	0	0	0	0	0	–		1	0
Guingamp	2006–07	12	1	0	0	1	0	–		13	1
Guingamp	2007–08	18	0	3	0	0	0	–		21	0
Guingamp	2008–09	3	0	0	0	1	0	–		4	0
Guingamp	2009–10	9	0	2	0	2	0	1	0	14	0
Vendée Poiré sur Vie	2011–12	29	0	0	0	0	0	–		29	0
Beroe Stara Zagora	2012–13	11	0	4	1	–		–		15	1
Beroe Stara Zagora	2013–14	27	0	4	0	–		2	0	33	0
Beroe Stara Zagora	2014–15	28	0	3	0	–		–		31	0
Beroe Stara Zagora	2015–16	27	2	4	0	–		4	0	35	2
Career total		172	3	20	1	4	0	7	0	203	4

== Honours ==
Guingamp

- Coupe de France: 2008–09

Beroe Stara Zagora

- Bulgarian Cup: 2012–13
- Bulgarian Supercup: 2013
