= Nikolay Hristov (footballer, born 1989) =

Bulgarian footballer

Personal information
- Full name: Nikolay Veselinov Hristov
- Date of birth: 1 August 1989 (age 37)
- Place of birth: Bulgaria
- Height: 1.77 m (5 ft 10 in)
- Position: Midfielder

Team information
- Current team: Levski Lom
- Number: 4

Senior career*
Years	Team	Apps	(Gls)
2007–2009	Belite orli	41	(2)
2010–2013	Botev Vratsa	70	(2)
2013–2014	Pelister	26	(0)
2014–2016	Bregalnica Štip	57	(4)
2016–2017	Lokomotiv GO	18	(0)
2017–2018	Litex Lovech	27	(0)
2018–2019	CSKA 1948	26	(0)
2020	Spartak Pleven	4	(0)
2020–	Levski Lom	0	(0)
- * Club domestic league appearances and goals as of 1 August 2020

Nikolay Hristov (Bulgarian: Николай Христов; born 1 August 1989) is a Bulgarian footballer who plays as a midfielder for Levski Lom.

== Career ==
On 27 June 2017, Hristov signed with Litex Lovech. He left the club at the end of the 2017–18 season.

On 25 June 2018, Hristov signed with CSKA 1948.
