= Romain Élie =

French footballer (born 1985)

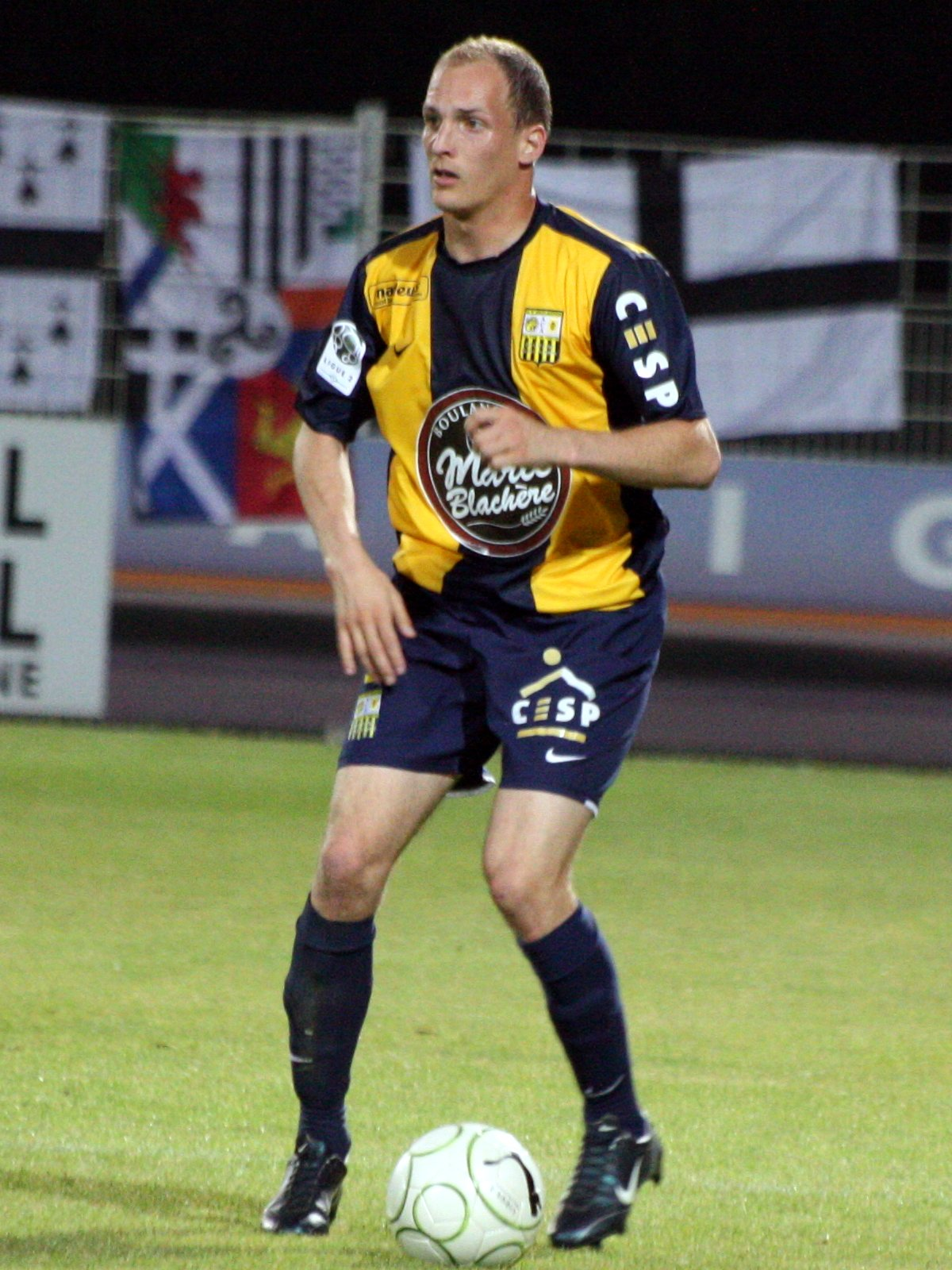

Personal information
- Date of birth: 6 March 1985 (age 41)
- Place of birth: Beauvais, France
- Height: 1.81 m (5 ft 11 in)
- Position: Centre-back

Team information
- Current team: Beauvais
- Number: 3

Youth career
- Beauvais

Senior career*
Years	Team	Apps	(Gls)
2002–2003	Beauvais B		
2003–2005	Rouen	17	(0)
2005–2006	Raon-l'Étape	35	(1)
2006–2008	Boulogne	48	(2)
2008–2009	Gueugnon	34	(1)
2009–2012	Arles-Avignon	62	(0)
2010–2011	→ Royal Charleroi (loan)	6	(0)
2012–2013	Levski Sofia	24	(2)
2014	Le Pontet	10	(0)
2014–2016	Nîmes	22	(0)
2016–2020	Le Puy	88	(0)
2020–	Beauvais	18	(0)
- * Club domestic league appearances and goals as of 21:33, 14 November 2022 (UTC)

Romain Élie (born 6 March 1985) is a French professional footballer who plays as a centre-back who plays for Championnat National 1 club Beauvais.
