= Cristóvão Ramos =

Portuguese footballer (born 1983)

Cristóvão
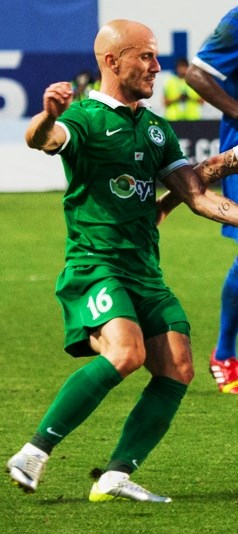
- Cristóvão playing with Omonia in 2014

Personal information
- Full name: Cristóvão da Silva Ramos
- Date of birth: 25 March 1983 (age 43)
- Place of birth: Lyon, France
- Height: 1.74 m (5 ft 9 in)
- Position: Winger

Youth career
- 1998–2001: Beira-Mar
- 2001–2002: Porto

Senior career*
Years	Team	Apps	(Gls)
2001–2005	Porto B	98	(18)
2005	Penafiel	11	(0)
2006–2007	Leixões	8	(0)
2007–2009	AEP	40	(8)
2009–2012	Anorthosis	58	(7)
2012–2013	Levski Sofia	41	(6)
2013	Konyaspor	0	(0)
2014	Levski Sofia	3	(0)
2014–2016	Omonia	45	(3)

International career
2003–2004	Portugal U20	4	(1)
2004	Portugal U21	3	(0)
- * Club domestic league appearances and goals

Cristóvão da Silva Ramos (born 25 March 1983), known simply as Cristóvão, is a former Portuguese footballer who played as a right winger.

== Club career ==
Cristóvão was born in Lyon, France. After playing youth football with FC Porto he made his senior debuts with the B-team in the third division, going on to spend four years with them in that tier. Released in the summer of 2005 without one single official appearance for the main squad, he joined Primeira Liga club F.C. Penafiel, but left after a couple of months and moved to Leixões S.C. in the second level, where he appeared very rarely over the course of two (incomplete) seasons.

In late December 2007, Cristovão signed with AEP Paphos F.C. from Cyprus. In the 2009 off-season he joined fellow First Division team Anorthosis Famagusta F.C., making his league debut on 30 August in a 0–0 away draw against Ermis Aradippou.

On 3 February 2012, Cristóvão moved to Bulgaria with PFC Levski Sofia, signing a two-and-a-half-year contract. He scored on his first First Professional Football League appearance, helping his team to a 2–1 win over PFC Cherno More Varna; on 29 April 2012, he netted the only goal in a derby success against PFC CSKA Sofia.

Cristóvão was released by Levski in summer 2013 (alongside some of the other foreign players) mainly due to his high salary, but he returned to the club after the winter break.

== Club statistics ==
As of 3 February 2012

Club	Season	League		Cup		Europe		Total	
Club	Season	Apps	Goals	Apps	Goals	Apps	Goals	Apps	Goals
Porto B	2001–02	4	1	—		—		4	1
Porto B	2002–03	25	3	—		—		25	3
Porto B	2003–04	35	9	—		—		35	9
Porto B	2004–05	34	5	—		—		34	5
Porto B	Total	98	18	0	0	0	0	98	18
Penafiel	2005–06	11	0	1	0	—		12	0
Penafiel	Total	11	0	1	0	0	0	12	0
Leixões	2005–06	6	0	0	0	—		6	0
Leixões	2006–07	2	0	1	0	—		3	0
Leixões	Total	8	0	1	0	0	0	9	0
AEP	2007–08	15	4	?	?	—		15	4
AEP	2008–09	25	4	?	?	—		25	4
AEP	Total	40	8	0	0	0	0	40	8
Anorthosis	2009–10	21	2	?	?	4	0	25	2
Anorthosis	2010–11	26	5	?	?	8	1	34	6
Anorthosis	2011–12	11	0	?	?	2	1	13	1
Anorthosis	Total	58	7	0	0	14	2	72	9
Levski Sofia	2011–12	13	3	1	0	0	0	14	3
Levski Sofia	Total	13	3	1	0	0	0	14	3
Career total		215	33	3	0	14	2	231	35
