= Veselin Penev =

Bulgarian footballer

Personal information
- Full name: Veselin Angelov Penev
- Date of birth: 11 August 1982 (age 44)
- Place of birth: Yambol, Bulgaria
- Height: 1.78 m (5 ft 10 in)
- Position: Left-back

Team information
- Current team: Beroe II (manager)

Youth career
- Beroe

Senior career*
Years	Team	Apps	(Gls)
2001–2002	Beroe	28	(1)
2002–2006	Naftex Burgas	95	(3)
2006–2009	Chernomorets Burgas	15	(0)
2008–2009	→ Naftex Burgas (loan)	13	(1)
2009	Spartak Varna	10	(0)
2010	Nesebar	13	(0)
2010–2018	Beroe	199	(0)
2019–2020	Minyor Radnevo	?	(?)
Total		373	(5)

Managerial career
- 2018–2020: Minyor Radnevo (assistant)
- 2020–2022: Beroe (U-19)
- 2022: Beroe (Youth)
- 2022–: Beroe II
- * Club domestic league appearances and goals as of 2 May 2023

Veselin Penev (Bulgarian: Веселин Пенев; born 11 August 1982) is a Bulgarian footballer who plays as a left-sided defender for Minyor Radnevo.

== Career ==
Penev started his career in Stara Zagora with the local team Beroe. He was raised in Beroe Stara Zagora's youth teams. Between 2003 and 2006, he played for Naftex Burgas. He signed with Chernomorets in June 2006 on a free transfer from Naftex Burgas.

== Honours ==
=== Club ===
Beroe

- Bulgarian Cup (1): 2013
- Bulgarian Supercup (1): 2013
