= Zapryan Zapryanov =

Bulgarian footballer

Personal information
- Full name: Zapryan Todorov Zapryanov
- Date of birth: 15 June 1994 (age 32)
- Place of birth: Plovdiv, Bulgaria
- Height: 1.78 m (5 ft 10 in)
- Position: Midfielder

Team information
- Current team: Sekirovo
- Number: 8

Youth career
- FC Rakovski
- Lokomotiv Plovdiv

Senior career*
Years	Team	Apps	(Gls)
2012–2013	Lokomotiv Plovdiv	8	(0)
2013–2014	Rakovski	14	(0)
2015	Maritsa Plovdiv		
2016–2018	Rakovski		
2018–2019	Maritsa Plovdiv		
2019–2021	Gigant Saedinenie	16	(3)
2022–2023	Levski Karlovo	49	(14)
2024–	Sekirovo	0	(0)

International career
2012–2013	Bulgaria U19	5	(0)
- * Club domestic league appearances and goals as of 14:15, 21 February 2024 (UTC)

Zapryan Zapryanov (Bulgarian: Запрян Запрянов; born 15 June 1994) is a Bulgarian footballer who currently plays for Sekirovo as a midfielder.

== Career ==
He made his league debut for Lokomotiv Plovdiv on 9 December 2012 in a 1–0 home win against Pirin Gotse Delchev, coming on as a substitute.

In June 2018, Zapryanov joined Maritsa Plovdiv.
