= Vladimir Zafirov =

Bulgarian footballer

Personal information
- Full name: Vladimir Yordanov Zafirov
- Date of birth: 21 March 1983 (age 43)
- Place of birth: Sliven, Bulgaria
- Height: 1.87 m (6 ft 1 1/2 in)
- Positions: Centre-back; left-back

Youth career
- Sliven 2000

Senior career*
Years	Team	Apps	(Gls)
2003–2005	Sliven 2000		
2005–2006	CSKA Sofia	1	(0)
2006	→ Conegliano German (loan)	10	(0)
2006–2007	Naftex Burgas	21	(0)
2007–2009	Sliven 2000	34	(1)
2009–2010	Chernomorets Balchik	33	(3)
2011	Etar 1924	9	(0)
2011–2016	Beroe Stara Zagora	97	(1)
2016–2017	Vereya	25	(0)
- * Club domestic league appearances and goals as of 4 June 2017

Vladimir Yordanov Zafirov (Bulgarian: Владимир Зафиров; born 21 March 1983) is a Bulgarian football player who plays as a defender.

== Honours ==
Beroe

- Bulgarian Cup (1): 2012–13
- Bulgarian Supercup (1): 2013
