= Georgi Andonov =

Bulgarian footballer

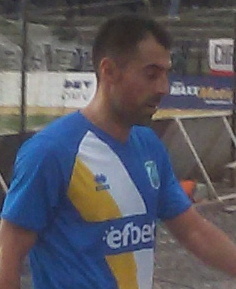

Personal information
- Full name: Georgi Bonchev Andonov
- Date of birth: 28 June 1983 (age 43)
- Place of birth: Plovdiv, Bulgaria
- Height: 1.80 m (5 ft 11 in)
- Position: Forward

Youth career
- Botev Plovdiv

Senior career*
| Years | Team | Apps | (Gls) |
| 2002–2006 | Botev Plovdiv | 103 | (12) |
| 2006–2009 | Cherno More | 51 | (4) |
| 2009 | → Botev Plovdiv (loan) | 13 | (2) |
| 2009–2010 | Beroe | 26 | (10) |
| 2010–2012 | Chernomorets Burgas | 40 | (6) |
| 2012–2014 | Beroe | 66 | (25) |
| 2014 | Denizlispor | 5 | (1) |
| 2015–2016 | Beroe | 32 | (4) |
| 2016 | Cherno More | 4 | (0) |
| 2016–2018 | Vereya | 54 | (9) |
| 2018 | Arda | 11 | (0) |
| 2019 | Tsarsko Selo | 12 | (1) |
| 2019–2020 | Hebar | 9 | (1) |
| 2020–2021 | Levski Karlovo | | |
| 2021 | Asenovets | | |
- * Club domestic league appearances and goals as of 1 August 2020

Georgi Andonov (Bulgarian: Георги Андонов; born 28 June 1983 in Plovdiv) is a Bulgarian footballer who plays as a forward.

== Career ==
Andonov's first club was Botev Plovdiv. With Botev he played 112 games and scored 12 goals.

In 2006, Cherno More Varna signed Andonov to a four-year deal for a €100,000. During a 2008–09 season, after a few poor performances along with the impressive form of Miroslav Manolov and Yordan Yurukov, Andonov found regular starting positions in attack hard to find. In January 2009, he was loaned in his previously club Botev to the end of the season.

On 3 July 2009, Andonov signed a contract with Beroe Stara Zagora.

In May 2010 Andonov signed a two-year deal with Chernomorets Burgas.

In February 2012, Andonov was released from his contract and returned to Beroe Stara Zagora as a free agent. He scored a hat-trick in the opening game of the 2012–13 season against Botev Vratsa on 11 August. On 15 May 2013, Andonov led Beroe out as captain in the 2013 Bulgarian Cup Final, which they won 6–4 after penalties against Levski Sofia, as Andonov collected his second Bulgarian Cup winner's medal.

On 12 June 2018, Andonov signed with Second League club Arda.

In May 2021, Andonov moved to Asenovets.

== Honours ==
=== Club ===
Beroe Stara Zagora

- Bulgarian Cup (2): 2009–10, 2012–13
- Bulgarian Supercup (1): 2013
