= Dustley Mulder =

Footballer (born 1985)

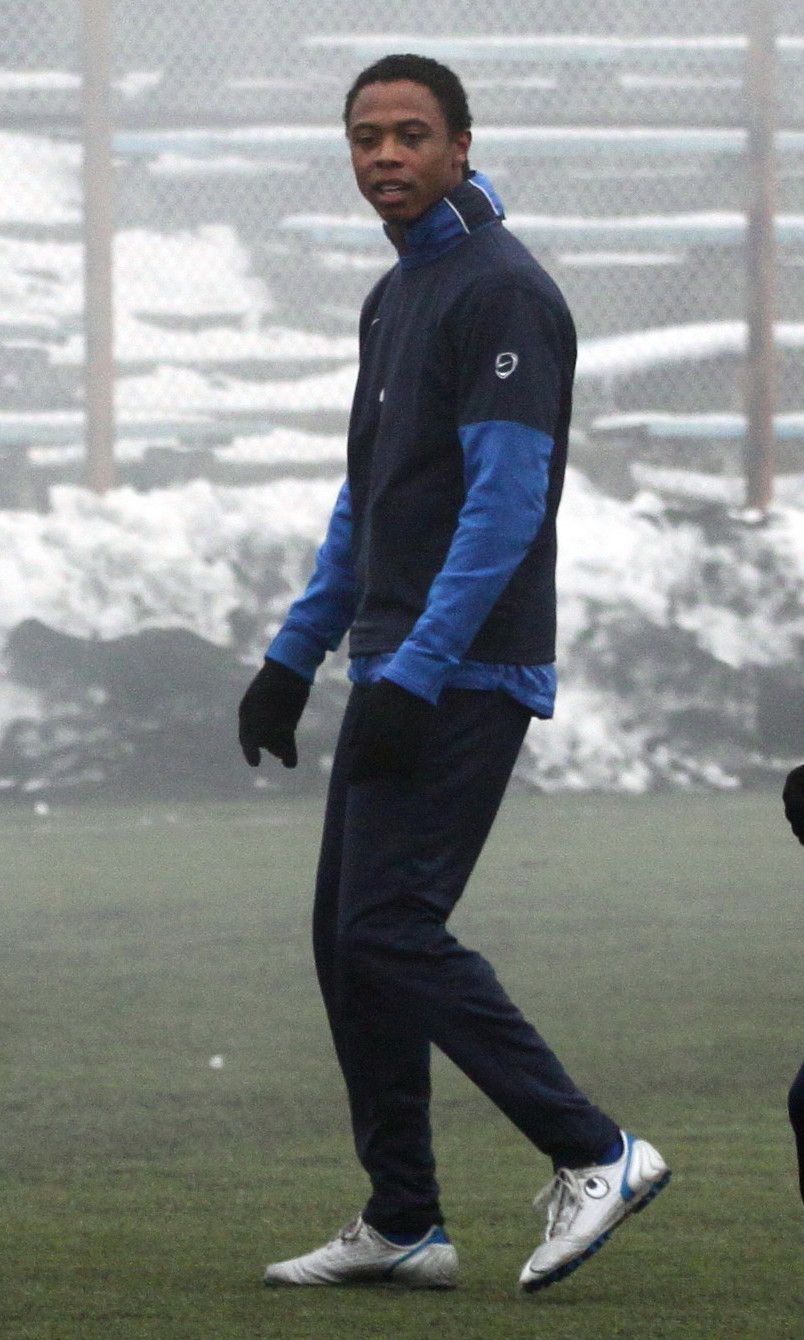

Personal information
- Full name: Dustley Roman Mulder
- Date of birth: 27 January 1985 (age 41)
- Place of birth: Baarn, Netherlands
- Height: 1.81 m (5 ft 11 in)
- Position: Right-back

Youth career
- IJsselmeervogels
- –2000: Utrecht
- 2000–2004: Feyenoord

Senior career*
Years	Team	Apps	(Gls)
2004–2006	Feyenoord	0	(0)
2004–2005	→ Excelsior (loan)	46	(4)
2006–2010	RKC Waalwijk	142	(4)
2010–2014	Levski Sofia	95	(2)
2014–2015	Apollon Limassol	11	(0)
2015–2016	NAC Breda	18	(0)
Total		312	(10)

International career
2015–2017	Curaçao	19	(0)
Medal record
Men's football
Representing Curaçao
Caribbean Cup
Winner	2017 Martinique
- * Club domestic league appearances and goals

Dustley Roman Mulder (born 27 January 1985) is a former professional footballer who played as a right back. Born in the Netherlands, he represented the Curaçao national team at international level. He works as a youth coach with NAC Breda.

== Club career ==
=== Youth years ===
Mulder was born in Baarn, and is a product of Feyenoord's youth academy. In 2004, he started playing for Feyenoord's satellite team SBV Excelsior.

=== Excelsior ===
Mulder made his debut in professional football as part of the Excelsior Rotterdam squad in the 2004–05 season. For two seasons there, he made 46 caps, scoring 4 goals.

=== RKC Waalwijk ===
In 2006, Mulder started playing for RKC Waalwijk. For five seasons he became an irreplaceable part of the right part of the defense, making 153 or more caps and scoring 4 goals. Mulder left Waalwijk at the end of the 2009–10 season, when his contract expired.

=== Levski Sofia ===
On 30 June 2010, Mulder agreed to join Bulgarian side Levski Sofia. On the following day he made his unofficial debut in a friendly against Metalist Kharkiv, before signing a two-year contract on 2 July as a free agent. He made his competitive debut on 22 July in a 2–0 away win over Dundalk in the second qualifying round of the 2010–11 UEFA Europa League.

On 8 December 2011, Mulder signed a one-year contract extension, keeping him at Levski until 2013.

He scored his first goal for Levski on 25 August 2012 in a 2–0 win against Montana at the Ogosta Stadium. In January 2013, it was reported that Mulder had extended his contract with Levski. The new two-year contract was signed on 15 January. Mulder ended 2012–13 season with a total of 5 goals.

In the summer of 2013 he was temporarily released from Levski, but was reinstated to the first team a month later.

In December 2013 during a game against CSKA Sofia for the Bulgarian Cup, Mulder scored the last penalty for his team in the 7–6 win which led the team to the quarterfinals of the tournament. Mulder made his last appearance for Levski Sofia on 24 May 2014, after replacing Elin Topuzakov in the first half of a 3–2 win over Lazio in an exhibition match held to commemorate 100 years of the founding of the "blues". In the beginning of June 2014, the newly appointed sports director of Levski announced that the "bluemen" would no longer use Dustley's services as a player. In his four years playing for the Bulgarian club, Mulder made 95 appearances and scored 2 goals.

=== Apollon Limassol ===
In July 2014, Mulder signed a one-year contract with Cypriot club Apollon Limassol, with an option for an additional year. He made his official debut on 21 August 2014, in the 1–1 home draw with Lokomotiv Moscow in a UEFA Europa League match after coming on as a substitute during the second half.

=== NAC Breda ===
In July 2015, Mulder joined Dutch side NAC Breda for one year, with the possibility of a second one.

== International career ==
Mulder made his debut for the Curaçaoa national team in a qualification match for the 2018 World Cup against Montserrat on 28 March 2015. With Curaçao, Mulder won the final of the 2017 Caribbean Cup on 25 June 2017 by beating Jamaica 2–1. At that time, he was not under contract with any club.

== Managerial career ==
In mid-2018, Mulder became a player-assistant coach at BSV Boeimeer. In July 2020, he was appointed assistant coach of the NAC Breda under-18 side under head coach Rogier Molhoek.

== Career statistics ==
=== Club ===
As of 9 January 2014

Appearances and goals by club, season and competition
Club	Season	League			Cup		Europe		Total	
Club	Season	Division	Apps	Goals	Apps	Goals	Apps	Goals	Apps	Goals
Excelsior	2004–05	Eerste Divisie	22	3						
Excelsior	2005–06	Eerste Divisie	24	1						
Excelsior	Total		46	4						
RKC Waalwijk	2005–06	Eredivisie	11	0						
RKC Waalwijk	2006–07	Eredivisie	25	1						
RKC Waalwijk	2007–08	Eerste Divisie	37	1						
RKC Waalwijk	2008–09	Eerste Divisie	37	1						
RKC Waalwijk	2009–10	Eredivisie	32	1						
RKC Waalwijk	Total		142	4						
Levski Sofia	2010–11	A PFG	22	0	2	0	11	0	35	0
Levski Sofia	2011–12	A PFG	25	0	3	0	2	0	30	0
Levski Sofia	2012–13	A PFG	26	2	4	3	2	0	32	5
Levski Sofia	2013–14	A PFG	15	0	4	1	2	0	21	1
Levski Sofia	Total		88	2	13	4	17	0	113	6
Career total			276	10	13	4	17	0	113	6

== Honours ==
Curaçao

- Caribbean Cup: 2017
