= Stefan Velev =

Bulgarian footballer

Personal information
- Full name: Stefan Dimitrov Velev
- Date of birth: 2 May 1989 (age 37)
- Place of birth: Sofia, Bulgaria
- Height: 1.81 m (5 ft 11 in)
- Position: Central midfielder

Team information
- Current team: Botev Ihtiman
- Number: 77

Youth career
- 1997–2007: Septemvri Sofia
- 2007–2008: Slavia Sofia

Senior career*
Years	Team	Apps	(Gls)
2008–2009	Lokomotiv StZ	26	(3)
2009–2010	Lyubimets	19	(1)
2010–2012	Beroe	70	(2)
2013–2015	Levski Sofia	43	(0)
2015–2016	Lokomotiv Plovdiv	26	(1)
2016	Dinamo Tbilisi	6	(0)
2017–2018	Slavia Sofia	39	(4)
2018–2020	Sepsi OSK	56	(1)
2020–2023	Cherno More	76	(4)
2023–2024	Botev Vratsa	46	(0)
2025–	Botev Ihtiman	59	(7)

International career
2007–2008	Bulgaria U19	7	(0)
2012–2016	Bulgaria	4	(0)
- * Club domestic league appearances and goals as of 19:11, 1 November 2026 (UTC)

Stefan Velev (Bulgarian: Стефан Велев; born 2 May 1989) is a Bulgarian professional footballer who plays as a midfielder for Botev Ihtiman.

== Club career ==
Born in Sofia, Velev played for Septemvri as a schoolboy, before joining Slavia Sofia. But he found it difficult to break into the first team due to the consistency of Slavčo Georgievski and Pavle Popara.

In June 2008 Velev signed a two-year contract with Lokomotiv Stara Zagora. He made his B PFG and Lokomotiv debut on 9 August in a home 1–0 against Shumen, scoring the goal of the win.

On 13 March 2017, Velev signed a 1 1/2-year contract with Slavia Sofia. He left the club at the end of the 2017–18 season when his contract expired.

On 15 June 2018, Velev signed with Sepsi OSK.

== International career ==
Velev earned his first cap for Bulgaria on 29 May 2012, after coming on as a second-half substitute in a 2–0 loss against Turkey in an exhibition game.

== Career statistics ==
Bulgaria national team
Year	Apps	Goals
2012	1	0
2013	1	0
2015	1	0
2016	2	0
Total	5	0

== Honours ==
Slavia Sofia

- Bulgarian Cup: 2017–18
