= Orlin Starokin =

Bulgarian footballer

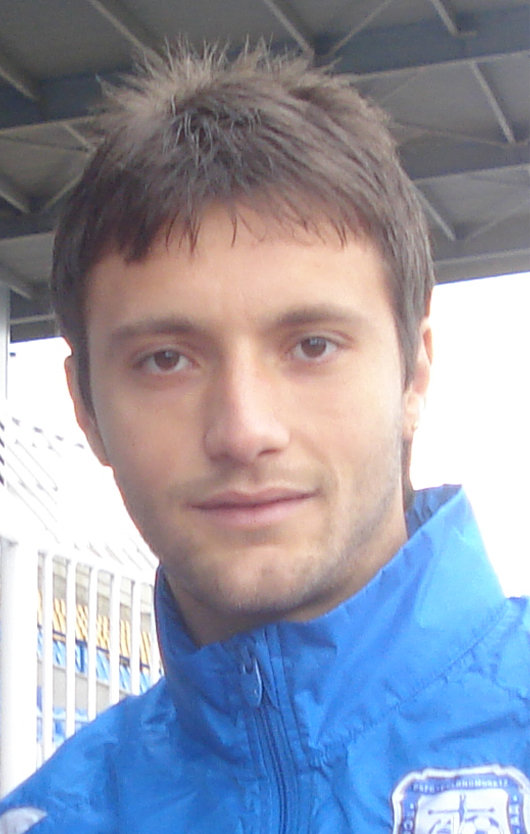

Personal information
- Full name: Orlin Ognyanov Starokin
- Date of birth: 8 January 1987 (age 39)
- Place of birth: Sofia, Bulgaria
- Height: 1.77 m (5 ft 10 in)
- Positions: Left back; defensive midfielder

Youth career
- 1997–2005: CSKA Sofia

Senior career*
Years	Team	Apps	(Gls)
2005–2008	Naftex Burgas	54	(3)
2006–2007	→ Chernomorets Burgas (loan)	17	(1)
2009–2011	Chernomorets Burgas	69	(1)
2011–2014	Levski Sofia	71	(4)
2014	Irtysh Pavlodar	10	(0)
2015	Lokomotiv Sofia	10	(0)
2015	Dinamo București	1	(0)
2015–2016	Botev Plovdiv	15	(0)
2016–2017	Pirin Blagoevgrad	25	(3)
2017	Cherno More	16	(2)
2018	Vitosha Bistritsa	13	(1)
2018–2019	Alki Oroklini	24	(1)
2019–2020	Enosis Neon Paralimni	12	(0)
2020	Levski Sofia	11	(0)
2021–2022	Pirin Blagoevgrad	25	(2)
2022–2023	Rilski Sportist	33	(2)
2024	Kostinbrod	11	(0)
Total		417	(20)
- * Club domestic league appearances and goals

Orlin Ognyanov Starokin (Bulgarian: Орлин Огнянов Старокин; born 8 January 1987) is a former Bulgarian professional footballer who played as a left-back or defensive midfielder.

Starokin played a total of 262 games in the Bulgarian First League and scored 12 goals, playing for Naftex Burgas, Chernomorets Burgas, Levski Sofia, Lokomotiv Sofia, Botev Plovdiv, Pirin Blagoevgrad, Cherno More Varna and Vitosha Bistritsa. He also played in Kazakhstan, Romania and Cyprus.

== Club career ==
=== Youth career ===
Starokin began his footballing career with the CSKA Sofia youth team. There he played as an offensive midfielder. He improved his skills at the academy until 2005.

=== Naftex Burgas ===
At the age of 18, in 2005, Starokin moved to Naftex Burgas, signing his first professional contract. At Naftex he played at first as a left winger and left back. In his first season in professional football, Starokin earned 19 appearances playing in the top division, scoring one goal.

=== Chernomorets Burgas ===
In the summer of 2006 Starokin was on loan to Chernomorets Burgas, with whom he became champion of the second division. Later he was bought and played there until 2011.

=== Levski Sofia ===
On 14 June 2011, he signed for Levski Sofia. On 2 July 2011, Starokin made his unofficial debut for Levski in the 1–0 win against Lokomotiv Sofia in an exhibition match.

In June 2014 Starokin refused to renew his contract with Levski and decided to leave the club after three years and 71 appearances in which he scored 4 goals.

=== Irtysh Pavlodar ===
Starokin signed a contract with Irtysh Pavlodar in Kazakhstan. Starokin left Irtysh in November 2014, following the conclusion of the season.

=== Botev Plovdiv ===
After a short spell at Dinamo București Starokin joined Botev Plovdiv until the end of the season. He made an official debut on 12 September during a 2–0 home defeat from Litex Lovech.

=== Cherno More ===
On 14 June 2017, Starokin joined Cherno More Varna. On 21 July 2017, he made his debut in a 4–0 away win over Vereya, playing as a defensive midfielder.

=== Alki Oroklini ===
On 30 June 2018, Starokin signed a one-year contract with Cypriot club Alki Oroklini.

== International career ==
In late August 2017, Starokin earned his first call-up to the Bulgaria national team, for the 2018 World Cup qualifiers against Sweden and the Netherlands, but did not debut.

== Career statistics ==
As of 12 December 2020

Appearances and goals by club, season and competition
Club	Season	League			National cup		Continental		Other		Total	
Club	Season	Division	Apps	Goals	Apps	Goals	Apps	Goals	Apps	Goals	Apps	Goals
Naftex Burgas	2005–06	A Group	19	1	0	0	–		–		19	1
Naftex Burgas	2007–08	B Group	22	1	0	0	–		–		22	1
Naftex Burgas	2008–09	B Group	13	1	0	0	–		–		13	1
Naftex Burgas	Total		54	3	0	0	0	0	0	0	54	3
Chernomorets Burgas (loan)	2006–07	B Group	17	1	0	0	–		–		17	1
Chernomorets Burgas	2008–09	A Group	14	0	0	0	–		–		14	0
Chernomorets Burgas	2009–10	A Group	25	1	0	0	–		–		25	1
Chernomorets Burgas	2010–11	A Group	30	0	2	0	–		–		32	0
Chernomorets Burgas	Total		69	1	2	0	0	0	0	0	71	1
Levski Sofia	2011–12	A Group	26	1	2	0	2	0	–		30	1
Levski Sofia	2012–13	A Group	16	1	5	0	2	0	–		23	1
Levski Sofia	2013–14	A Group	29	3	0	0	1	0	–		30	3
Levski Sofia	Total		71	5	7	0	5	0	0	0	83	5
Irtysh Pavlodar	2014	Kazakhstan Premier League	10	0	1	0	–		–		11	0
Lokomotiv Sofia	2014–15	A Group	10	0	1	0	–		–		11	0
Dinamo București	2015–16	Liga I	1	0	0	0	–		–		1	0
Botev Plovdiv	2015–16	A Group	15	0	1	0	–		–		16	0
Pirin Blagoevgrad	2016–17	Bulgarian First League	25	3	2	0	–		–		27	3
Cherno More Varna	2017–18	Bulgarian First League	16	2	1	0	–		–		17	2
Vitosha Bistritsa	2017–18	Bulgarian First League	13	1	0	0	–		–		13	1
Alki Oroklini	2018–19	Cypriot First Division	24	1	0	0	–		–		24	1
Enosis Neon Paralimni	2019–20	Cypriot First Division	12	0	1	0	–		–		13	0
Levski Sofia	2020–21	Bulgarian First League	11	0	1	0	–		–		12	0
Career total			348	15	15	0	5	0	0	0	368	15
