= Dimitar Vezalov =

Bulgarian footballer

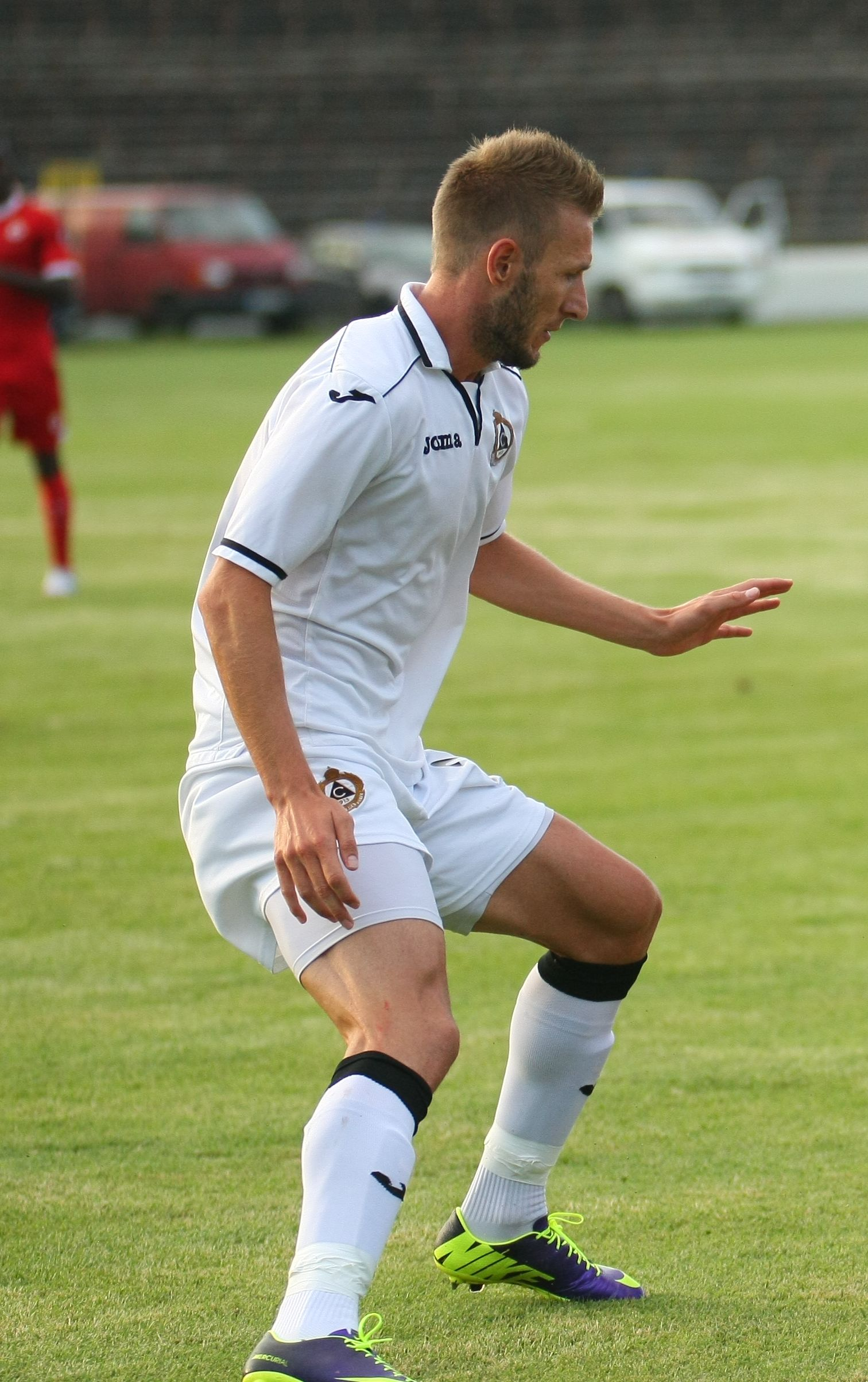

Personal information
- Full name: Dimitar Kostadinov Vezalov
- Date of birth: 13 April 1987 (age 39)
- Place of birth: Bansko, Bulgaria
- Height: 1.91 m (6 ft 3 in)
- Position: Centre-back

Youth career
- Septemvri Sofia

Senior career*
Years	Team	Apps	(Gls)
2004–2005	Marek Dupnitsa		
2005–2007	Svilengrad 1921		
2007–2008	Montana		
2008–2009	Svilengrad 1921	40	(1)
2009–2011	Lyubimets 2007	44	(2)
2012	Beroe Stara Zagora	13	(1)
2012–2013	Levski Sofia	15	(0)
2014	Botev Plovdiv	2	(0)
2014–2015	Slavia Sofia	26	(0)
2015	Bansko	15	(2)
2016	Zagłębie Sosnowiec	8	(0)
2016–2019	Lokomotiv Plovdiv	69	(1)
2019–2020	Hebar Pazardzhik	18	(1)
2020–2022	Botev Ihtiman		
- * Club domestic league appearances and goals

Dimitar Vezalov (Bulgarian: Димитър Везалов; born 13 April 1987) is a Bulgarian former professional footballer who played primarily as a centre-back and occasionally in the left-back position.

== Honours ==
Lokomotiv Plovdiv

- Bulgarian Cup: 2018–19
