= Todor =

Todor (Bulgarian, Macedonian, and Serbian: Тодор/Todor) is a Bulgarian, Macedonian and Serbian given name, a local rendering of the name Theodore. The Hungarian form of the name is rendered similarly as Tódor.

As a form of the name Theodore, Todor also ultimately comes from the Greek Θεόδωρος (Theodoros), signifying "gift of god", from θεός (theos) "god" and δῶρον (doron) "gift". Slavic equivalents bearing a similar meaning are Bozhidar and Bogdan. The name Todd is similar too but has different meaning.

The Bulgarian diminutives of Todor are Тошко (Toshko), Тошо (Tosho) and Тоше (Toshe) and the Macedonian diminutive is Тоше (Toše) and Тодорче (Todorče).

== Notable people ==
- Todor Aleksandrov (1881–1924), Bulgarian revolutionary, army officer, politician and teacher
- Todor Batkov (born 1958), Bulgarian football club president
- Todor Burmov (1834–1906), Prime Minister of Bulgaria
- Todor Diev (1934–1995), Bulgarian footballer
- Todor Gečevski (born 1977), Macedonian basketball player
- Todor Ivanchov (1858–1906), Bulgarian prime minister
- Todor Kableshkov (1851–1886), Bulgarian revolutionary
- Tódor Kármán (1881–1963), Hungarian-American mathematician, aerospace engineer, and physicist
- Todor Kolev (disambiguation)
- Todor Manojlović (1883–1968), Serbian writer
- Todor Panitsa (1879–1925), Bulgarian revolutionary
- Todor "Toše" Proeski (1981–2007), Macedonian singer songwriter
- Todor Skalovski (1909–2004), Macedonian composer, chorus and orchestra conductor
- Todor Stoykov (born 1977), Bulgarian professional basketball player
- Todor Todorov (disambiguation)
- Todor Veselinović (1930–2017), Serbian footballer and coach
- Todor Zhivkov (1911–1998), Bulgarian communist statesman

== See also ==
- Theodore of Amasea (referred to as "Saint Todor")
- Todorov
- Todorović
- Todorovski
- Todorić
- Tudor (name)
