= 2013–14 PFC Levski Sofia season =

Levski Sofia
2013–14 season
- President: Todor Batkov
- Head Coach: Nikolay Mitov (until 13 July 2013); Elin Topuzakov (caretaker until 22 July 2013); Slaviša Jokanović (until 8 October 2013); Antoni Zdravkov (until 20 March 2014); Elin Topuzakov (caretaker until end of season)
- Stadium: Georgi Asparuhov; Vasil Levski National Stadium (for derby games only)
- A Group: 5th
- Bulgarian Cup: Quarterfinals
- UEFA Europa League: First qualifying round
- Top goalscorer: League: Garry Rodrigues (11 goals); All: Garry Rodrigues (14 goals)
- Highest home attendance: 12 000 vs Irtysh (4 July 2013)
- Lowest home attendance: 100 vs Lyubimets (4 December 2013)
| Home colours | Away colours |

Levski Sofia entered season 2013–14 as runners-up in the Bulgarian A Football Group and finalists in the Bulgarian Cup. The Blues will celebrate their 100th anniversary during this season.

== Summary ==
=== June, July and August ===
In June 2013 after the dramatic end of the 2012–13 season Nikolay Mitov was appointed as the manager of the club. Mitov was previously in charge as a caretaker manager. He failed to win both the championship and cup despite not losing one single game. During the summer club's president announced the return of Nasko Sirakov as general manager of the club. Sirakov was fired from the position back in 2008. Under his lead and with the coaching of Mitov the team did not succeed in European Competitions and got kicked-out in the First Round of the Europa League from Kazakh side Irtysh Pavlodar with 0–2 on aggregate. This resulted the resignation of Mitov and on the 22nd of July Serbian coach Slaviša Jokanović was appointed as the new manager of the club. The failure in Europa League lead to the release of a few players like Cristovao Ramos, Ramon Lopes and striker Joao Silva.

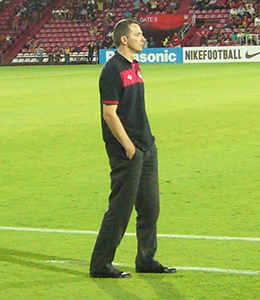
Slaviša Jokanović was appointed as Levski's manager in July 2013.

Levski started the campaign with 2 lost games in-a-row against Botev Plovdiv and Lokomotiv Plovdiv finding themselves on last position. After two disappointing home draws against Beroe and Cherno More Varna the team signed with 5 new players – Larsen Touré, Alex Perez, Dimitar Makriev, Miroslav Ivanov and Goran Blažević. Insensibly the team started to improve in the Championship and got up in among the first 7.

=== September and October ===
The team's started to improve but another disappointing draw was made against Lokomotiv Sofia. This resulted the resignation of Slaviša Jokanović and the appointing of Ivaylo Petev as new coach on the 8 October. The fans reacted negatively to this change as earlier in the season they stated their support towards Jokanovic. On the presentation of Petev some of the fans interrupted the press conference and announced that they will not accept Petev as new coach because of his sympathy to Levski's biggest rival CSKA Sofia and got him kicked out. On the next day Petev refused to take Levski's job while general managers Nasko Sirakov and Ivo Tonev also resigned after the events leaving ex-player Hristo Yovov as the only manager in the club. Tonev though made a promise to finish the construction of the main stand of the stadium which was started in February 2013 and was scheduled to be completed in May 2014 for the 100th anniversary. However, later it was reported that due to financial troubles the construction will be delayed and the stand won't be opened for the anniversary. Meanwhile, Antoni Zdravkov was put in charge of the team. 10 days after these events the team lost heavily the Eternal Derby from CSKA with 0:3.

=== November and December ===
Despite the heavy loss Zdravkov and his assistants Marian Hristov and Elin Topuzakov managed to rebuild the squad and the team won 8 out of 10 next games. Levski managed to beat Pirin Gotse Delchev in the Bulgarian Cup second round with 9–0 on aggregate drawing with fierce rivals CSKA in the Third Round. At the end of December the team knocked-out CSKA after two goalless draw and a 7–6 victory over penalties. The Blues qualified for the Quarterfinals of the tournament where they will play Botev Plovdiv. During the winter break medias reported that key player Garry Rodrigues will be sold to title competitors Ludogorets Razgrad. However, after a meeting between club's boss Todor Batkov and fans the deal didn't go through.

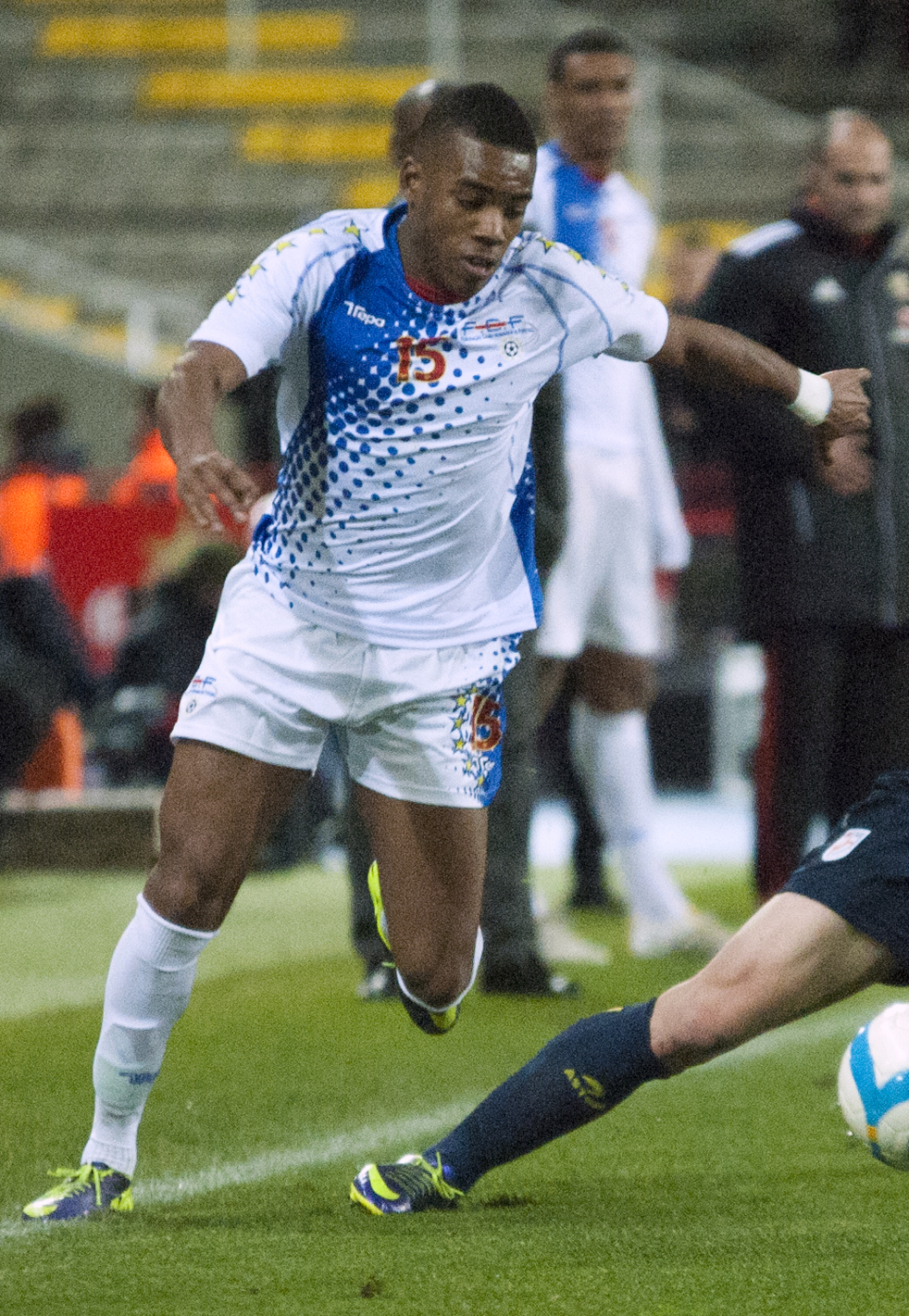
Garry Rodrigues was Levski's topgoalscorer for the first half of the season with 14 goals in all competitions.

=== January and February ===
After New Year's Eve the team found himself placed on 3rd position. However, due to financial crisis a few players were sold and released. Young star Antonio Vutov was sold to Serie A-side Udinese while key player Garry Rodrigues was transferred to Primera División-side Elche CF. The total income of both transfers is reported to be more than 1 million euros. Other players like Dimitar Vezalov, Alex Perez, Yordan Miliev and Ilian Yordanov were released from the club.

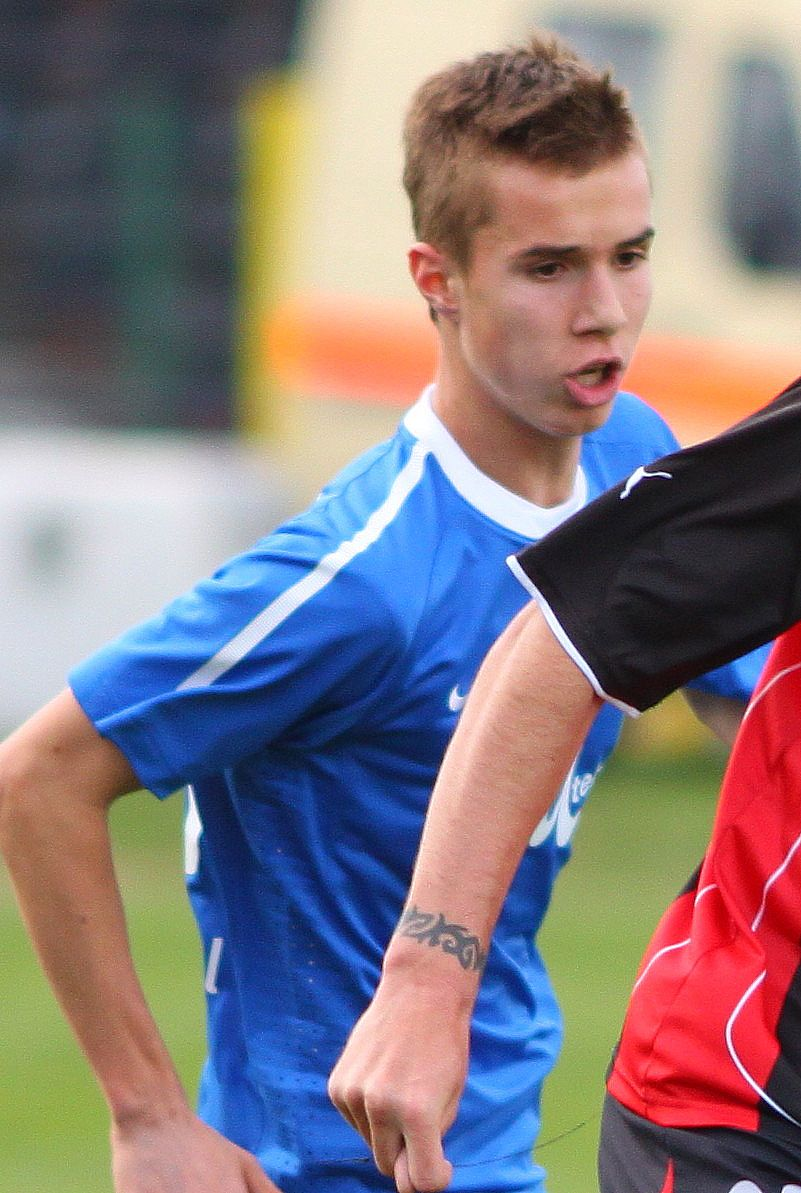
Youngster Antonio Vutov was sold to Italian club Udinese after notching 39 appearances with his home club.

In the other way around a total of 5 new players arrived. In the beginning of January Levski signed with Lyubimets captain Anton Ognyanov and with central defender Aymen Belaid from Lokomotiv Plovdiv as well. The estimated fee of both transfers was undisclosed. Afterwards the club signed also with another defender Pavel Čmovš coming from Eredivisie side NEC Nijmegen. On the last day of January Levski signed also with Beroe's Plamen Krumov and with Bulgarian international striker Valeri Bojinov.

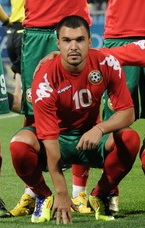
Bulgarian international Valeri Bojinov signed with Levski for 6 months. This will be the first time in his career he will ever played for a Bulgarian team.

Levski started their preparation for the second part of the season with two camps. The first one was held in Sozopol, a city on the Bulgarian coast. The squad played one friendly game against Chernomorets Burgas which was won 5:3. The goals were scored by Larsen Toure (hat-trick), youngster Borislav Tsonev and the new signing Anton Ognyanov. In the beginning of February the team continued with the preparation with another camp in Cyprus. On Cypriot soil The Blues played 5 more friendly games in total. They started with 3 losses from Russian side Mordovia Saransk, Czech champions Viktoria Plzeň and another side from the Czech Republic Teplice. Levski lost against the Mordovia with 1:2 with a goal scored from penalty and 2:4 from Teplice with Valeri Bojinov and Miroslav Ivanov scoring. In their 3rd exhibition game against Viktoria Plzeň the team lost 0:3 after a very disappointing performance from the referee of the game. In the 2nd minute of the match Anton Ognyanov was heavily injured by Tomáš Wágner. Ognyanov was taken to the hospital where it was confirmed that his ankle is fractured and will treat it for the next 3 months which will force him to miss the rest of the season. For the challenge Wagner didn't receive a card. 10 minutes after the incident the Czech side opened the score in the game after a handball which was not noticed from the referee.

The team finished their preparation with 2 draws against Lithuanian champions Žalgiris and Russian side Ural Sverdlovsk. Both games ended 1:1. Levski finished their preparation with only 1 win out of 6 matches. Between the last 2 games Levski signed with another played following the heavy injury of Anton Ognyanov. Brazilian playmaker Rafael Bastos came on the 12 February and started to train individually in order to catch up with the squad. On the 17 February Bastos signed for 1 year with Levski. 2 days before the renewal of the championship the team signed with another player. Left-back Ricardo Nunes agreed on a 1.5-year deal with the club. Levski renewed the Bulgarian league fixtures on the 22 February with a home draw game against Slavia Sofia. The match ended 2–2 and 2 days after it the club signed with another played. Portuguese winger Cristóvão Ramos returned to the team after playing from 2012 to 2013. The contract will be until the end of the season.

Despite the new signings Levski suffered another loss. This time the Blues lost from Lokomotiv Sofia with 0:1. Few days after the match chairman Todor Batkov decided to fire Sports director Hristo Yovov and assistant coach Marian Hristov. Both club legends were surprised by the decision.

=== March, April and May ===
Despite all the changes no head coach was appointed and on 8 March Levski lost the Eternal derby against CSKA Sofia with 0–1. This was the first time in 27 years when Levski losses 2 derby games in the same season. One week after the last round from the Regular season Levski had to play again with CSKA and lost one more with a late goal scored by Plamen Krachunov. In the meantime the team got eliminated from the Bulgarian Cup Quarterfinals from Botev Plovdiv. Despite winning with 3:1 in the First Leg the team lost the re-match with 0:2 and got knocked-out 3:3 on aggregate and more away goals. This resulted the resignation of Antoni Zdravkov and started a war between the fans and the club owner Todor Batkov. Club icon Elin Topuzakov was appointed as the new head coach of the team until the end of the season helped by another ex-played Viktorio Pavlov. This season will be the 5th in-a-row in which the Blues will not manage to win a trophy. Topuzakov lead the team to 3 wins in-a-row. Both Plovdiv sides Botev and Lokomotiv were beaten by 2-0 followed by another 1–0 win against Cherno More Varna in Sofia.

Despite the run of positive results the club registered 3 more losses in the next 3 games. The team lost 0-2 from Ludogorets in Razgrad, 1-2 from Litex Lovech in Sofia and 1–3 in the derby against CSKA Sofia. This was the 4th loss in-a-row in a derby game which never happened before. With only 5 games remaining Levski Sofia find themselves placed on 5th position with slight chance of achieving a qualification to UEFA competitions for the next season. It is most likely that the club will not participate in a European competition for the first time since 1990–91 season.

Following the derby loss Levski lost again in Plovdiv against Botev which made it the 4th lost game in-a-row which is a record for the club. Only in 4 other season Levski had managed to lose 4 games in-a-row. Those occasions happened in 1940, 1952, 1955 and 1960.

After the negative series of results Levski finished the season with 3 wins out of 4 games. Away victories were achieved against Cherno More and Litex while at home the Blues managed to win once against Loko Plovdiv and lost their last home game of the season against running champions Ludogorets. Levski finished in 5th place with 14 lost matches (club record for one season). For the first time since season 1990–91 Levski will not participate in European competitions.

On 23 May 2014 Levski ended the season with an anniversary game against Italian side SS Lazio. The game was entirely organised by the fans who made contact with the Italian club and raised funds for all the events that occurred around the friendly match. 160 sportsmen and footballers were awarded from the fans for their achievements with the sports club during the last 100 years. New sports director Georgi Ivanov, Aleksandar Aleksandrov, Elin Topuzakov, Hristo Yovov and other icons from the near past took participation in the football match against Lazio. The match ended 3–2 after Lazio took advantage with 0–2 in the first half. After the break Levski made a comeback with a brace by Dimitar Makriev and a wonderful winning goal scored by 15-year-old youngster from the Academy Stanislav Ivanov. At midnight the whole stadium was lighten up with flares and fireworks.

On 24 May 2014 the celebrations continued with a ceremony on Mogilkata, a square in the center of Sofia where in 1914 the club was founded by a group of students from the near school. After the ceremony the fans started a parade through the entire city centre and ended up at the monument of the patron of the club Vasil Levski.

== Transfers ==
=== Summer transfers ===
In:

| No. | Pos. | Nation | Player |
|---|---|---|---|
| 1 | GK | CRO | Goran Blažević (from (Croatia) Hajduk Split) |
| 5 | DF | ESP | Álex Pérez (on loan from (Spain) Getafe) |
| 7 | FW | BUL | Dimitar Makriev (free agent, previously at (Israel) Ashdod) |
| 7 | MF | BRA | Ramon Lopes (from (Ukraine) Volyn Lutsk) |
| 9 | FW | BUL | Tsvetan Genkov (from (Poland) Wisła Kraków) |
| 20 | FW | BUL | Miroslav Ivanov (free agent, previously at Ludogorets) |
| 26 | DF | BUL | Hristo Popadiyn (loan return from (Italy) Chievo) |
| 59 | FW | GUI | Larsen Touré (free agent, previously at (France) Stade Brestois 29) |
| 75 | MF | MRI | Kévin Bru (from (France) Istres) |

Out:

| No. | Pos. | Nation | Player |
|---|---|---|---|
| 1 | GK | BUL | Ivaylo Vasilev (free transfer to Haskovo) |
| 3 | DF | FRA | Romain Élie (released) |
| 7 | MF | BUL | Milen Vasilev (to Slavia Sofia) |
| 8 | MF | SVK | Roman Procházka (on loan to (Slovakia) Spartak Trnava) |
| 9 | FW | POR | João Silva (released) |
| 10 | MF | BUL | Hristo Yovov (retired) |
| 12 | FW | NED | Sjoerd Ars (to (Turkey) Karşıyaka, previously on loan at (Turkey) Konyaspor) |
| 16 | MF | POR | Cristóvão Ramos (released) |
| 17 | FW | BUL | Todor Chavorski (on loan to Dobrudzha, previously on loan at Pirin Razlog) |
| 19 | FW | GBS | Basile de Carvalho (to (Belgium) White Star Bruxelles) |
| 29 | MF | SLO | Rene Mihelič (loan return to (Portugal) C.D. Nacional) |
| 32 | MF | BUL | Radoslav Tsonev (on loan to Botev Vratsa) |
| — | MF | BRA | Ramon Lopes (released) |

See List of Bulgarian football transfers summer 2013

=== Winter transfers ===
In:

| No. | Pos. | Nation | Player |
|---|---|---|---|
| 3 | DF | TUN | Aymen Belaïd (from Lokomotiv Plovdiv) |
| 8 | MF | BUL | Anton Ognyanov (from Lyubimets) |
| 10 | FW | BUL | Valeri Bojinov (free transfer) |
| 16 | MF | BRA | Rafael Bastos (free transfer) |
| 17 | DF | CZE | Pavel Čmovš (free transfer from (Netherlands) NEC Nijmegen) |
| 28 | FW | POR | Cristóvão Ramos (free transfer) |
| 32 | MF | BUL | Radoslav Tsonev (loan return from Botev Vratsa) |
| 40 | DF | RSA | Ricardo Nunes (free transfer) |
| 71 | MF | BUL | Plamen Krumov (from Beroe) |

Out:

| No. | Pos. | Nation | Player |
|---|---|---|---|
| 5 | DF | ESP | Álex Pérez (loan return to (Spain) Getafe) |
| 10 | MF | BUL | Antonio Vutov (to (Italy) Udinese) |
| 11 | FW | CPV | Garry Rodrigues (to (Spain) Elche) |
| 13 | DF | BUL | Dimitar Vezalov (released) |
| 22 | FW | BUL | Iliyan Yordanov (released) |
| 28 | DF | POR | Nuno Pinto (end of contract) |
| 55 | DF | BUL | Yordan Miliev (to (North Macedonia) Shkëndija) |

== Squad ==
Updated on 22 May 2014.

| Squad No. | Name | Nationality | Position(s) | Since | Date of birth (age) | Previously at | Games played | Goals scored |
Goalkeepers
| 1 | Goran Blažević | (Croatia) | GK | 2013 | 7 June 1986 (age 40) | (Croatia) Hajduk Split | 23 | 0 |
| 23 | Plamen Iliev | (Bulgaria) | GK | 2011 | 30 November 1991 (age 34) | (Bulgaria) Vidima-Rakovski | 87 | 0 |
| 24 | Aleksandar Lyubenov | (Bulgaria) | GK | - | 11 February 1995 (age 31) | (Bulgaria) Levski Academy | 0 | 0 |
| 89 | Mihail Ivanov | (Bulgaria) | GK | - | 7 July 1989 (age 37) | (Bulgaria) Botev Vratsa | 4 | 0 |
Defenders
| 2 | Dustley Mulder | (Netherlands) | RB | 2010 | 27 January 1985 (age 41) | (Netherlands) RKC Waalwijk | 97 | 3 |
| 3 | Aymen Belaïd | (Tunisia) | CB | 2014 | 2 January 1987 (age 39) | (Bulgaria) Lokomotiv Plovdiv | 9 | 0 |
| 4 | Stanislav Angelov (C) | (Bulgaria) | RB / DM | 2012 | 12 April 1978 (age 48) | (Cyprus) Anorthosis | 175 | 11 |
| 5 | Álex Pérez | (Spain) | CB | 2013 | 11 August 1991 (age 35) | (Spain) Getafe | 15 | 0 |
| 6 | Orlin Starokin | (Bulgaria) | LB / DM | 2011 | 8 January 1987 (age 39) | (Bulgaria) Chernomorets Burgas | 75 | 5 |
| 14 | Miki Orachev | (Bulgaria) | LB | - | 19 March 1996 (age 30) | (Bulgaria) Levski Academy | 7 | 0 |
| 17 | Pavel Čmovš | (Czech Republic) | CB | 2014 | 29 June 1990 (age 36) | (Netherlands) NEC Nijmegen | 8 | 0 |
| 29 | Deyan Ivanov | (Bulgaria) | CB | - | 12 April 1996 (age 30) | (Bulgaria) Levski Academy | 0 | 0 |
| 35 | Plamen Dimov | (Bulgaria) | CB / DM | 2013 | 29 October 1990 (age 35) | (Bulgaria) Chernomorets Burgas | 21 | 1 |
| 40 | Ricardo Nunes | (South Africa) | LB | 2014 | 18 June 1986 (age 40) | (Slovakia) Žilina | 10 | 0 |
Midfielders
| 8 | Anton Ognyanov | (Bulgaria) | LB / LW | 2014 | 30 June 1988 (age 38) | (Bulgaria) Lyubimets | 0 | 0 |
| 16 | Rafael Bastos | (Brazil) | LW / AM | 2014 | 1 January 1985 (age 41) | (Saudi Arabia) Al Nassr | 9 | 0 |
| 18 | Borislav Tsonev | (Bulgaria) | CM | - | 29 April 1995 (age 31) | (Bulgaria) Levski Academy | 22 | 1 |
| 20 | Miroslav Ivanov | (Bulgaria) | LW / AM / RW | 2013 | 11 September 1981 (age 45) | (Bulgaria) Ludogorets | 106 | 13 |
| 21 | Radoslav Tsonev | (Bulgaria) | CM | - | 29 April 1995 (age 31) | (Bulgaria) Levski Academy | 12 | 1 |
| 22 | Vladislav Misyak | (Bulgaria) | LW | - | 15 July 1995 (age 31) | (Bulgaria) Levski Academy | 9 | 1 |
| 25 | Daniel Dimov | (Bulgaria) | DM / CM | 2011 | 21 January 1989 (age 37) | (Bulgaria) Cherno More | 77 | 7 |
| 27 | Steven Petkov | (Bulgaria) | RW | - | 7 May 1995 (age 31) | (Bulgaria) Levski Academy | 6 | 0 |
| 28 | Cristóvão Ramos | (Portugal) | RW | 2014 | 7 May 1995 (age 31) | (Turkey) Konyaspor | 54 | 8 |
| 45 | Vladimir Gadzhev | (Bulgaria) | DM / CM | 2008 | 18 July 1987 (age 39) | (Greece) Panathinaikos | 160 | 21 |
| 59 | Larsen Touré | (Guinea) | LW / RW | 2013 | 20 July 1984 (age 42) | (France) Stade Brestois 29 | 22 | 4 |
| 71 | Plamen Krumov | (Bulgaria) | RB / RW | 2014 | 4 November 1985 (age 40) | (Bulgaria) Beroe | 12 | 1 |
| 75 | Kévin Bru | (Mauritius) | DM / CM | 2013 | 12 December 1988 (age 37) | (France) Istres | 24 | 1 |
| 77 | Stefan Velev | (Bulgaria) | DM / CM | 2013 | 2 May 1989 (age 37) | (Bulgaria) Beroe | 21 | 0 |
Strikers
| 7 | Dimitar Makriev | (Bulgaria) | ST | 2013 | 7 January 1984 (age 42) | (Israel) Ashdod | 32 | 7 |
| 9 | Tsvetan Genkov | (Bulgaria) | ST | 2013 | 8 February 1984 (age 42) | (Poland) Wisła Kraków | 30 | 7 |
| 19 | Iliya Dimitrov | (Bulgaria) | ST | - | 10 July 1996 (age 30) | (Bulgaria) Levski Academy | 1 | 0 |
| 86 | Valeri Bojinov | (Bulgaria) | ST | 2014 | 15 February 1986 (age 40) | (Portugal) Sporting CP | 15 | 7 |

== Statistics ==
=== Goalscorers ===
| Players | League | Cup | Europa League | Total |
|---|---|---|---|---|
| (Cape Verde) Garry Rodrigues | 11 | 3 | 0 | 14 |
| (Bulgaria) Dimitar Makriev | 7 | 0 | 0 | 7 |
| (Bulgaria) Tsvetan Genkov | 5 | 2 | 0 | 7 |
| (Bulgaria) Valeri Bojinov | 6 | 1 | 0 | 7 |
| (Bulgaria) Daniel Dimov | 5 | 0 | 0 | 5 |
| (Bulgaria) Vladimir Gadzhev | 5 | 0 | 0 | 5 |
| (Guinea) Larsen Touré | 4 | 0 | 0 | 4 |
| (Bulgaria) Orlin Starokin | 3 | 1 | 0 | 4 |
| (Bulgaria) Antonio Vutov | 2 | 1 | 0 | 3 |
| (Bulgaria) Iliyan Yordanov | 2 | 1 | 0 | 3 |
| (Bulgaria) Miroslav Ivanov | 2 | 0 | 0 | 2 |
| (Bulgaria) Borislav Tsonev | 0 | 1 | 0 | 1 |
| (Bulgaria) Plamen Dimov | 1 | 0 | 0 | 1 |
| (Mauritius) Kévin Bru | 1 | 0 | 0 | 1 |
| (Bulgaria) Plamen Krumov | 1 | 0 | 0 | 1 |
| (Netherlands) Dustley Mulder | 1 | 0 | 0 | 1 |
| (Portugal) Cristóvão Ramos | 1 | 0 | 0 | 1 |
| (Bulgaria) Vladislav Misyak | 1 | 0 | 0 | 1 |
| (Bulgaria) Radoslav Tsonev | 1 | 0 | 0 | 1 |

=== Assists ===
| Player | League | Cup | Europa League | Total |
|---|---|---|---|---|
| (Cape Verde) Garry Rodrigues | 9 | 1 | 0 | 10 |
| (Bulgaria) Vladimir Gadzhev | 8 | 1 | 0 | 9 |
| (Portugal) Nuno Pinto | 5 | 1 | 0 | 6 |
| (Bulgaria) Miroslav Ivanov | 4 | 0 | 0 | 4 |
| (Bulgaria) Dimitar Makriev | 3 | 1 | 0 | 4 |
| (Bulgaria) Tsvetan Genkov | 4 | 0 | 0 | 4 |
| (Bulgaria) Antonio Vutov | 2 | 0 | 0 | 2 |
| (Bulgaria) Orlin Starokin | 1 | 1 | 0 | 2 |
| (Netherlands) Dustley Mulder | 2 | 0 | 0 | 2 |
| (Bulgaria) Yordan Miliev | 1 | 0 | 0 | 1 |
| (Bulgaria) Daniel Dimov | 1 | 0 | 0 | 1 |
| (Guinea) Larsen Touré | 1 | 0 | 0 | 1 |
| (Mauritius) Kévin Bru | 1 | 0 | 0 | 1 |
| (Bulgaria) Steven Petkov | 1 | 0 | 0 | 1 |
| (Brazil) Rafael Bastos | 1 | 0 | 0 | 1 |

=== Cards ===
| Player | Booked | Sent off (straight red) | Total |
|---|---|---|---|
| (Bulgaria) Stanislav Angelov | 13 | 2 | 15 |
| (Bulgaria) Vladimir Gadzhev | 9 | 1 | 10 |
| (Bulgaria) Daniel Dimov | 8 | 1 | 9 |
| (Bulgaria) Orlin Starokin | 9 | 0 | 9 |
| (Bulgaria) Borislav Tsonev | 7 | 2 | 8 |
| (Portugal) Nuno Pinto | 7 | 0 | 7 |
| (Netherlands) Dustley Mulder | 7 | 0 | 7 |
| (Bulgaria) Antonio Vutov | 6 | 0 | 6 |
| (Tunisia) Aymen Belaïd | 5 | 1 | 6 |
| (Guinea) Larsen Touré | 5 | 1 | 6 |
| (Bulgaria) Tsvetan Genkov | 6 | 0 | 6 |
| (Bulgaria) Miroslav Ivanov | 5 | 0 | 5 |
| (Spain) Álex Pérez | 4 | 0 | 4 |
| (Czech Republic) Pavel Čmovš | 4 | 0 | 4 |
| (Bulgaria) Plamen Krumov | 4 | 0 | 4 |
| (Bulgaria) Valeri Bojinov | 4 | 0 | 4 |
| (Bulgaria) Plamen Dimov | 3 | 0 | 3 |
| (Bulgaria) Yordan Miliev | 3 | 0 | 3 |
| (Mauritius) Kévin Bru | 3 | 0 | 3 |
| (Bulgaria) Stefan Velev | 2 | 0 | 2 |
| (Cape Verde) Garry Rodrigues | 1 | 1 | 2 |
| (Bulgaria) Plamen Iliev | 2 | 0 | 2 |
| (Portugal) Cristóvão Ramos | 2 | 0 | 2 |
| (South Africa) Ricardo Nunes | 2 | 0 | 2 |
| (Bulgaria) Dimitar Makriev | 2 | 0 | 2 |
| (Bulgaria) Miki Orachev | 2 | 0 | 2 |
| (Bulgaria) Steven Petkov | 2 | 0 | 2 |
| (Portugal) João Silva | 1 | 0 | 1 |
| (Bulgaria) Dimitar Vezalov | 1 | 0 | 1 |
| (Brazil) Rafael Bastos | 1 | 0 | 1 |
| (Bulgaria) Radoslav Tsonev | 1 | 0 | 1 |

== Pre-season and friendlies ==
=== Friendly game for the 100th year anniversary ===
| 23 May 2014 | Levski Sofia (Bulgaria) | 3–2 | (Italy) Lazio | Sofia, Bulgaria |
| 21:45 CEST | Makriev 47', 58'; S. Ivanov 76' | Report | Tounkara 14'; Kakuta 35' | Stadium: Vasil Levski National Stadium; Attendance: 36,000; Referee: Georgi Yordanov |

=== Summer ===
| 22 June 2013 | Levski Sofia (Bulgaria) | 1–0 | (Brazil) Arapongas | Enzesfeld-Lindabrunn |
| 19:00 EET | Silva 42' | Report |

| 25 June 2013 | Levski Sofia (Bulgaria) | 1–1 | (Austria) Mattersburg | Enzesfeld-Lindabrunn |
| 19:00 EET | de Carvalho 30' | Report | Mörz 69' |

| 27 June 2013 | Levski Sofia (Bulgaria) | 1–1 | (Ukraine) Metalurh Donetsk | Enzesfeld-Lindabrunn |
| 19:00 EET | Rodrigues 64' | Report | Nelson 86' |

| 29 June 2013 | Levski Sofia (Bulgaria) | 0–2 | (Russia) Amkar Perm | Enzesfeld-Lindabrunn |
| 19:00 EET | | Report | Peev 17'; Georgiev 84' |

=== Winter ===
| 25 January 2014 | Chernomorets Burgas | 3–5 | Levski Sofia | Sozopol |
| 14:00 EET | Angelov 7'; Deul 12'; D. Dimov 65' (o.g.) | Report | Touré 18', 35', 38'; Ognyanov 54'; B. Tsonev 85' | Stadium: Sozopol Stadium; Attendance: 1 000 |

| 3 February 2014 | Levski Sofia (Bulgaria) | 1–2 | (Russia) Mordovia Saransk | Paralimni |
| 15:00 EET | Angelov 88' (pen.) | Report | Nakhushev 25'; Lutsenko 37' | Stadium: Paralimni Stadium |

| 6 February 2014 | Levski Sofia (Bulgaria) | 2–4 | (Czech Republic) Teplice | Ayia Napa |
| 15:00 EET | Bojinov 20'; M. Ivanov 89' | Report | Čajić 11', 71'; Vůch 26'; Litsingi 76' (pen.) |

| 10 February 2014 | Levski Sofia (Bulgaria) | 0–3 | (Czech Republic) Viktoria Plzeň | Ayia Napa |
| 17:30 EET | | Report | Bakoš 13'; Ďuriš 26'; Wágner 49' |

| 12 February 2014 | Levski Sofia (Bulgaria) | 1–1 | (Lithuania) Žalgiris | Ayia Napa |
| EET | D. Dimov 28' | Report | Švrljuga 81' |

| 15 February 2014 | Levski Sofia (Bulgaria) | 1–1 | (Russia) Ural | Ayia Napa |
| EET | Bojinov 47' | Report | Yerokhin 34' |

== Competitions ==
=== Overall ===
| | Competition | Position |
|---|---|---|
| (European Union) | UEFA Europa League | First qualifying round |
| (Bulgaria) | Bulgarian Cup | Quarter Final |
| (Bulgaria) | A Group | 5th |

=== A Group ===
==== First phase ====
| Pos | Team | Pld | W | D | L | GF | GA | GD | Pts | Qualification |
|---|---|---|---|---|---|---|---|---|---|---|
| 4 | Botev Plovdiv | 26 | 13 | 7 | 6 | 45 | 21 | +24 | 46 | Qualification for championship group |
| 5 | Lokomotiv Plovdiv | 26 | 14 | 3 | 9 | 43 | 31 | +12 | 45 | Qualification for championship group |
| 6 | Levski Sofia | 26 | 13 | 5 | 8 | 45 | 24 | +21 | 44 | Qualification for championship group |
| 7 | Cherno More | 26 | 12 | 7 | 7 | 31 | 21 | +10 | 43 | Qualification for championship group |
| 8 | Beroe | 26 | 11 | 6 | 9 | 32 | 25 | +7 | 39 | Qualification for relegation group |

Source: A PFG (in Bulgarian)
Rules for classification: 1st points; 2nd head-to-head points; 3rd head-to-head goal difference; 4th head-to-head goals scored; 5th head-to-head away goals scored; 6th season goal difference; 7th season goals scored; 8th "sportsmanship" (R & Y cards); 9th draw

===== Results summary =====
| Overall | | | | | | | | Home | | | | | | Away | | | | | |
| Pld | W | D | L | GF | GA | GD | Pts | W | D | L | GF | GA | GD | W | D | L | GF | GA | GD |
|---|---|---|---|---|---|---|---|---|---|---|---|---|---|---|---|---|---|---|---|
| 26 | 13 | 5 | 8 | 45 | 24 | +21 | 44 | 6 | 4 | 3 | 24 | 10 | +14 | 7 | 1 | 5 | 21 | 14 | +7 |

Source: Competitive matches

===== Results by round =====
| Round | 1 | 2 | 3 | 4 | 5 | 6 | 7 | 8 | 9 | 10 | 11 | 12 | 13 | 14 | 15 | 16 | 17 | 18 | 19 | 20 | 21 | 22 | 23 | 24 | 25 | 26 |
|---|---|---|---|---|---|---|---|---|---|---|---|---|---|---|---|---|---|---|---|---|---|---|---|---|---|---|
| Ground | A | H | A | H | A | H | A | H | A | H | A | H | A | H | A | H | A | H | A | H | A | H | A | H | A | H |
| Result | L | L | W | D | D | D | W | L | W | W | W | D | L | W | W | W | L | W | L | W | W | W | W | D | L | L |
| Position | 10 | 14 | 8 | 9 | 10 | 9 | 7 | 10 | 8 | 6 | 6 | 6 | 7 | 7 | 5 | 5 | 5 | 5 | 6 | 6 | 6 | 4 | 3 | 4 | 5 | 6 |

A = Away; H = Home; W = Win; D = Draw; L = Loss

===== Matches =====
| 21 July 2013 1 | Botev Plovdiv | 2–1 | Levski Sofia | Plovdiv |
| 18:00 (EET) | Minev (yellow card) 36'; Nedelev (yellow card) 45' (goal) 57', 75'; Jirsák (yellow card) 45' | Report | Rodrigues 5' (red card) 35'; Ramos (yellow card) 12'; Velev (yellow card) 24'; Silva (yellow card) 62' | Stadium: Hristo Botev; Attendance: 10,410; Referee: Georgi Yordanov |

| 28 July 2013 2 | Levski Sofia | 1–2 | Lokomotiv Plovdiv | Sofia |
| 19:00 (EET) | Genkov 30' (yellow card) 60' | Report | N'Diaye 17'; Todorov (yellow card) 43'; Kamburov 57'; Georgiev (yellow card) 60'; Lazarov (yellow card) 62' do Carmo (yellow card) 83'; Tunchev (yellow card) 90' | Stadium: Georgi Asparuhov; Attendance: 1,910; Referee: Kalin Lyudmilov |

| 4 August 2013 3 | Pirin Gotse Delchev | 0–2 | Levski Sofia | Gotse Delchev |
| 18:00 (EET) | Abdikov (yellow card) 54' | Report | Genkov 36'; Rodrigues 55' (pen.); Vezalov (yellow card) 80' | Stadium: Gradski; Attendance: 1,910; Referee: Ivan Kirilov |

| 11 August 2013 4 | Levski Sofia | 0–0 | Beroe | Sofia |
| 20:00 (EET) | Pinto (yellow card) 14'; Gadzhev (yellow card) 37'; Bru (yellow card) 73'; Genkov (yellow card) 85' | Report | Krumov (yellow card) 26' (yellow-red card) 37'; Roncatto (yellow card) 46'; Z. Iliev (yellow card) 63'; Karadzhov (yellow card) 88'; Elias (yellow card) 90' | Stadium: Georgi Asparuhov; Attendance: 2,690; Referee: Georgi Kabakov |

| 18 August 2013 5 | Litex Lovech | 1–1 | Levski Sofia | Lovech |
| 21:00 (EET) | Vajushi (yellow card) 40'; Bodurov (yellow card) 50'; Jordán 53' (yellow card) 56' | Report | Rodrigues 51' (pen.); Angelov (yellow card) 66'; Genkov (yellow card) 79'; Miliev (yellow card) 89' | Stadium: Gradski; Attendance: 5,880; Referee: Nikola Popov |

| 25 August 2013 6 | Levski Sofia | 1–1 | Cherno More | Sofia |
| 20:00 (EET) | Vutov (yellow card) 13'; Rodrigues 50' (pen.); Starokin (yellow card) 59'; Angelov (yellow card) 65' | Report | Bacari (yellow card) 26'; A. Aleksandrov (yellow card) 43'; Stanchev (red card) 49'; Raykov 53'; Edenilson (yellow card) 75'; Kotev (yellow card) 90' | Stadium: Georgi Asparuhov; Attendance: 2,490; Referee: Nikolay Yordanov |

| 1 September 2013 7 | Lyubimets | 0–2 | Levski Sofia | Lyubimets |
| 18:00 (EET) | Velichkov (yellow card) 57'; Kolev (yellow card) 83' | Report | Álex Pérez (yellow card) 9'; Genkov 18'; Vutov 84' | Stadium: Gradski; Attendance: 2,890; Referee: Hristo Ristoskov |

| 15 September 2013 8 | Levski Sofia | 0–2 | Ludogorets | Sofia |
| 20:00 (EET) | Pinto (yellow card) 17'; M. Ivanov (yellow card) 22'; Vutov (yellow card) 38'; Gadzhev (yellow card) 75' | Report | Espinho 15' (yellow card) 49'; I. Stoyanov (yellow card) 31'; Misidjan 42'; Barthe (yellow card) 52'; Dyakov (yellow card) 63'; Bezjak (yellow card) 75'; Aleksandrov (yellow card) 82' | Stadium: Georgi Asparuhov; Attendance: 6,260; Referee: Ivaylo Stoyanov |

| 21 September 2013 9 | Chernomorets Burgas | 1–3 | Levski Sofia | Burgas |
| 20:00 (EET) | Fonseca 34'; Baltanov (yellow card) 35'; Manzorro (yellow card) 75' | Report | M. Ivanov 6' (yellow card) 74'; Oliveira 37' (o.g.); Rodrigues (yellow card) 45' (goal) 60' | Stadium: Lazur; Attendance: 1,400; Referee: Stanislav Todorov |

| 25 September 2013 10 | Levski Sofia | 6–0 | Neftochimic | Sofia |
| 18:00 (EET) | D. Dimov 14', 62'; M. Ivanov 35'; P. Dimov 42'; Gadzhev 69', 88' | Report | Hashev (yellow card) 61' | Stadium: Georgi Asparuhov; Attendance: 650; Referee: Georgi Ignatov |

| 28 September 2013 11 | Slavia Sofia | 0–1 | Levski Sofia | Sofia |
| 15:15 (EET) | Shalayev (yellow card) 38'; Fernando (yellow card) 48'; Popara (yellow card) 72' | Report | P. Dimov (yellow card) 28'; Álex Pérez (yellow card) 32'; Touré 57'; M. Ivanov (yellow card) 90'; Vutov (yellow card) 90' | Stadium: Slavia; Attendance: 850; Referee: Tsvetan Krastev |

| 4 October 2013 12 | Levski Sofia | 0–0 | Lokomotiv Sofia | Sofia |
| 15:00 (EET) | P. Dimov (yellow card) 54'; Miliev (yellow card) 86' | Report | Marquinhos (yellow card) 55'; Tom (yellow card) 87' | Stadium: Georgi Asparuhov; Attendance: 470; Referee: Hristo Ristoskov |

| 19 October 2013 13 | CSKA Sofia | 3–0 | Levski Sofia | Sofia |
| 16:00 (EET) | Milisavljević 30'; Popov 35'; Gargorov 37'; Sidibé (yellow card) 39'; Howard (yellow card) 67'; V. Iliev (yellow card) 76' | Report | Mulder (yellow card) 34'; Álex Pérez (yellow card) 39'; Pinto (yellow card) 54'; Gadzhev (yellow card) 59' | Stadium: Vasil Levski National Stadium; Attendance: 13,950; Referee: Georgi Yordanov |

| 26 October 2013 14 | Levski Sofia | 1–0 | Botev Plovdiv | Sofia |
| 15:15 (EET) | B. Tsonev (yellow card) 44' (yellow-red card) 68'; Genkov (yellow card) 68'; M. Ivanov (yellow card) 74'; Rodrigues 85' | Report | Minev (red card) 67' | Stadium: Georgi Asparuhov; Attendance: 3,930; Referee: Stanislav Todorov |

| 31 October 2013 15 | Lokomotiv Plovdiv | 2–3 | Levski Sofia | Plovdiv |
| 16:00 (EET) | Kiki 13'; Kamburov (yellow card) 19'; Georgiev (yellow card) 26' (red card) 45+1'; A. Belaïd (yellow card) 37'; Iliadis 74' | Report | Gadzhev 8'; Starokin (yellow card) 34'; Pinto (yellow card) 40'; Rodrigues 45+2' (pen.); Genkov (yellow card) 83' (goal) 85' | Stadium: Lokomotiv; Attendance: 0 No attendance due to sanction by the BFU. Referee: Aleksandar Kostadinov |

| 3 November 2013 16 | Levski Sofia | 4–1 | Pirin Gotse Delchev | Sofia |
| 18:00 (EET) | Makriev 9', 43'; Rodrigues 16'; Vutov (yellow card) 19'; Pinto (yellow card) 80'; Yordanov 86' | Report | Gutsev (yellow card) 65'; Bashov 85' (pen.) | Stadium: Georgi Asparuhov; Attendance: 1,170; Referee: Angel Angelov |

| 9 November 2013 17 | Beroe | 1–0 | Levski Sofia | Stara Zagora |
| 15:15 (EET) | Hristov 30' (pen.); Krumov (yellow card) 40'; Stoychev (yellow card) 54'; I. Ivanov (yellow card) 73'; Karadzhov (yellow card) 89'; Dishliev (yellow card) 90' | Report | D. Dimov (yellow card) 29'; Starokin (yellow card) 78'; P. Dimov (yellow card) 80'; Gadzhev (yellow card) 90'; Bru (yellow card) 90' | Stadium: Beroe; Attendance: 9,080; Referee: Georgi Dimitrov |

| 23 November 2013 18 | Levski Sofia | 4–1 | Litex Lovech | Sofia |
| 15:15 (EET) | D. Dimov 4'; Starokin 11', 73'; Angelov (yellow card) 41'; Bru 51'; Touré (yellow card) 68'; Gadzhev (yellow card) 77'; Mulder (yellow card) 90' | Report | Slavchev (yellow card) 33'; Jordán 61'; Milanov (yellow card) 90'; Vajushi (yellow card) 90' | Stadium: Georgi Asparuhov; Attendance: 3,680; Referee: Georgi Kabakov |

| 30 November 2013 19 | Cherno More | 2–1 | Levski Sofia | Varna |
| 13:00 (EET) | G. Iliev 41'; Bacari (yellow card) 42' (goal) 61'; S. Aleksandrov (yellow card) 45' (yellow-red card) 83'; Raykov (yellow card) 86'; Kitanov (yellow card) 90' | Report | Touré (yellow card) 37' (goal) 77'; Pinto (yellow card) 61'; D. Dimov (yellow card) 83' | Stadium: Ticha; Attendance: 4,300; Referee: Hristo Ristoskov |

| 4 December 2013 20 | Levski Sofia | 3–0 | Lyubimets | Sofia |
| 16:00 (EET) | Shokolarov 41' (o.g.); B. Tsonev (yellow card) 45'; Rodrigues 55'; Vutov 90+3' | Report | Ognyanov (yellow card) 15' | Stadium: Georgi Asparuhov; Attendance: 450; Referee: Tasko Taskov |

| 7 December 2013 21 | Ludogorets | 0–1 | Levski Sofia | Razgrad |
| 15:15 (EET) | Caiçara (yellow card) 26' (yellow-red card) 90'; Barthe (yellow card) 58'; Zlatinski (yellow card) 68'; Espinho (yellow card) 87'; V. Stoyanov (yellow card) 87'; Marcelinho (yellow card) 90' | Report | Touré 3'; Gadzhev (yellow card) 14'; Angelov (yellow card) 17' (yellow-red card) 75'; B. Tsonev (yellow card) 23'; Mulder (yellow card) 56'; D. Dimov (yellow card) 67'; Vutov (yellow card) 73'; P. Iliev (yellow card) 87'; Miliev (yellow card) 90' | Stadium: Ludogorets Arena; Attendance: 3,550; Referee: Georgi Yordanov |

| 12 December 2013 22 | Levski Sofia | 2–0 | Chernomorets Burgas | Sofia |
| 16:00 (EET) | Álex Pérez (yellow card) 16'; Touré 52'; Makriev 65' | Report | Trayanov (yellow card) 45'; Baltanov (yellow card) 57'; Manzorro (yellow card) 87' | Stadium: Georgi Asparuhov; Attendance: 640; Referee: Ivan Kirilov |

| 15 December 2013 23 | Neftochimic | 1–6 | Levski Sofia | Sliven |
| 14:00 (EET) | Yanev (yellow card) 57'; Álex Pérez 73' (o.g.); Patev (yellow card) 90' | Report | Starokin 6'; Makriev 15', 33'; B. Tsonev (yellow card) 65'; Rodrigues 71', 78' (pen.); Yordanov 90'; Vutov (yellow card) 90' | Stadium: Hadzhi Dimitar; Attendance: 780; Referee: Radan Miryanov |

| 22 February 2014 24 | Levski Sofia | 2–2 | Slavia Sofia | Sofia |
| 16:15 (EET) | Gadzhev (yellow card) 8'; Touré (yellow card) 57'; M. Ivanov (yellow card) 63'; Makriev 68'; Krumov 80'; Angelov (yellow card) 90' | Report | Shalayev (yellow card) 34'; Kurdov 43'; Pirgov (yellow card) 49' (yellow-red card) 90'; Fernando (yellow card) 64' (yellow-red card) 89'; Ristevski 74' | Stadium: Georgi Asparuhov; Attendance: 5,300; Referee: Aleksandar Kostadinov |

| 28 February 2014 25 | Lokomotiv Sofia | 1–0 | Levski Sofia | Sofia |
| 15:30 (EET) | Tom 77'; Hadzhiev (yellow card) 86' | Report | D. Dimov (yellow card) 75' | Stadium: Lokomotiv; Attendance: 1,940; Referee: Nikolay Yordanov |

| 8 March 2014 26 | Levski Sofia | 0–1 | CSKA Sofia | Sofia |
| 16:15 (EET) | Touré (yellow card) 8' (yellow-red card) 90+5'; Bojinov (yellow card) 45'; A. Belaïd (yellow card) 50'; Starokin (yellow card) 53'; Angelov (yellow card) 58' (yellow-red card) 68'; Gadzhev (yellow card) 72' (red card) after FT'; Makriev (yellow card) 80' | Report | Galchev (yellow card) 13' (yellow-red card) 29'; V. Iliev (yellow card) 65'; Gargorov 69' (pen.); M'Bolhi (yellow card) 72' (yellow-red card) 90+5'; Milisavljević (yellow card) 86'; Faug-Porret (yellow card) 89'; Popov (yellow card) 90'; Kossoko (red card) after FT' | Stadium: Vasil Levski National Stadium; Attendance: 9,920; Referee: Georgi Kabakov |

==== Championship group ====
| Pos | Team | Pld | W | D | L | GF | GA | GD | Pts | Qualification |
|---|---|---|---|---|---|---|---|---|---|---|
| 3 | Litex Lovech | 38 | 21 | 9 | 8 | 74 | 37 | +37 | 72 (Note: CSKA Sofia ahead of Litex Lovech on head-to-head points; CSKA Sofia: 10 pts, Litex Lovech: 1 pts.) | Qualification for Europa League first qualifying round |
| 4 | Botev Plovdiv | 38 | 18 | 11 | 9 | 57 | 32 | +25 | 65 | Qualification for Europa League first qualifying round |
| 5 | Levski Sofia | 38 | 19 | 5 | 14 | 59 | 39 | +20 | 62 | |
| 6 | Cherno More | 38 | 14 | 12 | 12 | 40 | 33 | +7 | 54 | |
| 7 | Lokomotiv Plovdiv | 38 | 15 | 5 | 18 | 49 | 55 | −6 | 50 | |

Source: A PFG (in Bulgarian)
Rules for classification: 1st points; 2nd head-to-head points; 3rd head-to-head goal difference; 4th head-to-head goals scored; 5th head-to-head away goals scored; 6th season goal difference; 7th season goals scored; 8th "sportsmanship" (R & Y cards); 9th draw

===== Results summary =====
| Overall | | | | | | | | Home | | | | | | Away | | | | | |
| Pld | W | D | L | GF | GA | GD | Pts | W | D | L | GF | GA | GD | W | D | L | GF | GA | GD |
|---|---|---|---|---|---|---|---|---|---|---|---|---|---|---|---|---|---|---|---|
| 12 | 6 | 0 | 6 | 14 | 15 | −1 | 18 | 3 | 0 | 3 | 9 | 9 | 0 | 3 | 0 | 3 | 5 | 6 | −1 |

Source: Competitive matches

===== Results by round =====
| Round | 1 | 2 | 3 | 4 | 5 | 6 | 7 | 8 | 9 | 10 | 11 | 12 | 13 | 14 |
|---|---|---|---|---|---|---|---|---|---|---|---|---|---|---|
| Ground | A | H | A | - | H | A | H | H | A | H | - | A | H | A |
| Result | L | W | W | - | W | L | L | L | L | W | - | W | L | W |
| Position | 7 | 5 | 4 | 5 | 5 | 5 | 5 | 5 | 5 | 5 | 5 | 5 | 5 | 5 |

A = Away; H = Home; W = Win; D = Draw; L = Loss

===== Matches =====
| 15 March 2014 27 | CSKA Sofia | 1–0 | Levski Sofia | Sofia |
| 16:15 (EET) | Yanchev (yellow card) 33'; Faug-Porret (yellow card) 79'; Krachunov 90+3' | Report | Touré (yellow card) 36'; Ramos (yellow card) 68'; Krumov (yellow card) 85' | Stadium: Vasil Levski National Stadium; Attendance: 10,060; Referee: Georgi Yordanov |

| 22 March 2014 28 | Levski Sofia | 2–0 | Botev Plovdiv | Sofia |
| 16:15 (EET) | D. Dimov 11'; Makriev 16'; Angelov (yellow card) 28'; R. Tsonev (yellow card) 51'; Čmovš (yellow card) 66'; B. Tsonev (yellow card) 83' (yellow-red card) 88' | Report | Sarmov (yellow card) 25'; Hristov (yellow card) 52'; Sprockel (yellow card) 58'; Luís Pedro (yellow card) 63'; Vander (yellow card) 70' | Stadium: Georgi Asparuhov; Attendance: 1,860; Referee: Ivaylo Stoyanov |

| 27 March 2014 29 | Lokomotiv Plovdiv | 0–2 | Levski Sofia | Plovdiv |
| 18:00 (EET) | Namouchi (yellow card) 28'; Delev (yellow card) 52'; T. Belaïd (red card) 76'; Lazarov (yellow card) 83' | Report | Angelov (yellow card) 25'; Bru (yellow card) 53'; Bojinov 61'; Gadzhev 72' | Stadium: Lokomotiv; Attendance: 1,940; Referee: Tasko Taskov |

| Levski rests for Round 30 |

| 6 April 2014 31 | Levski Sofia | 1–0 | Cherno More | Sofia |
| 19:30 (EET) | D. Dimov 17' (yellow card) 81'; Starokin (yellow card) 39'; A. Belaïd (yellow card) 59'; Bastos (yellow card) 74' | Report | Bacari (yellow card) 40' | Stadium: Georgi Asparuhov; Attendance: 1,910; Referee: Hristo Ristoskov |

| 9 April 2014 32 | Ludogorets | 2–0 | Levski Sofia | Razgrad |
| 19:15 (EET) | Espinho (yellow card) 50'; Zlatinski 73' (pen.); Bezjak (yellow card) 80' (goal) 90+4'; Aleksandrov (yellow card) 87' | Report | Čmovš (yellow card) 14'; Gadzhev (yellow card) 35'; D. Dimov (yellow card) 36'; A. Belaïd (yellow card) 82' (yellow-red card) 84'; B. Tsonev (yellow card) 87' | Stadium: Ludogorets Arena; Attendance: 5,900; Referee: Nikolay Yordanov |

| 12 April 2014 33 | Levski Sofia | 1–2 | Litex Lovech | Sofia |
| 16:15 (EET) | Čmovš (yellow card) 21'; Misyak 45+1'; Mulder (yellow card) 52'; Angelov (yellow card) 72'; Krumov (yellow card) 87' | Report | Vajushi 23'; Tsvetanov (yellow card) 35' (yellow-red card) 87'; Rumenov 42' (yellow card) 78'; Bozhikov (yellow card) 54'; S. Popov (yellow card) 75'; Milanov (yellow card) 84' | Stadium: Georgi Asparuhov; Attendance: 1,470; Referee: Nikola Popov |

| 21 April 2014 34 | Levski Sofia | 1–3 | CSKA Sofia | Sofia |
| 16:00 (EET) | A. Belaïd (yellow card) 53'; R. Tsonev (yellow card) 78' (goal) 82'; Starokin (yellow card) 84'; Bojinov (yellow card) 84'; Čmovš (yellow card) 89'; Nunes (yellow card) 90' | Report | Krachunov (yellow card) 25'; Yanchev (yellow card) 26'; Silva (yellow card) 37'; Kossoko 58'; I. Stoyanov 86'; Marković (yellow card) 90' (goal) 90+5' | Stadium: Vasil Levski National Stadium; Attendance: 8,650; Referee: Ivaylo Stoyanov |

| 26 April 2014 35 | Botev Plovdiv | 2–0 | Levski Sofia | Plovdiv |
| 16:15 (EET) | Sprockel (yellow card) 24'; Curtean 42' (yellow card) 43'; Minev (yellow card) 80'; Tsvetkov 89'; Doré (yellow card) 90' | Report | D. Dimov (yellow card) 10'; Touré (yellow card) 13'; Starokin (yellow card) 26'; Krumov (yellow card) 29'; Nunes (yellow card) 76' | Stadium: Botev 1912 Football Complex; Attendance: 2,700; Referee: Radan Miryanov |

| 1 May 2014 36 | Levski Sofia | 2–1 | Lokomotiv Plovdiv | Sofia |
| 18:00 (EET) | Genkov 11'; Bojinov 13' | Report | Kamburov 59'; T. Belaïd (yellow card) 68'; Georgiev (yellow card) 81' | Stadium: Georgi Asparuhov; Attendance: 540; Referee: Radan Miryanov |

| Levski rests for Round 37 |

| 7 May 2014 38 | Cherno More | 1–2 | Levski Sofia | Varna |
| 18:00 (EET) | Kitanov (yellow card) 5'; Venkov (yellow card) 8'; Domovchiyski 12'; Edenilson (yellow card) 18'; Bacari (yellow card) 37'; Kokonov (yellow card) 72'; Kotev (yellow card) 87' | Report | Gadzhev 8' (pen.) (yellow card) 88'; Krumov (yellow card) 10'; Orachev (yellow card) 36'; Bojinov 53' (yellow card) 72'; Steven (yellow card) 85'; Angelov (yellow card) 87' | Stadium: Ticha; Attendance: 1,490; Referee: Ivaylo Stoyanov |

| 11 May 2014 39 | Levski Sofia | 2–3 | Ludogorets | Sofia |
| 19:30 (EET) | Bojinov 27', 90+4' (pen.); Orachev (yellow card) 40'; Gadzhev (yellow card) 57'; Mulder (yellow card) 77' | Report | Hernández 29'; Zlatinski (penalty missed) 41'; Quixadá 48'; Vitinha (yellow card) 65'; Abalo (yellow card) 66' (goal) 87'; A. Aleksandrov (yellow card) 90' | Stadium: Georgi Asparuhov; Attendance: 1,450; Referee: Stanislav Todorov |

| 18 May 2014 40 | Litex Lovech | 0–1 | Levski Sofia | Lovech |
| 15:30 (EET) | Milanov (yellow card) 5'; Jordán (penalty missed) 44'; Bozhikov (yellow card) 60'; Slavchev (yellow card) 71' | Report | Orachev (yellow card) 10'; R. Tsonev (yellow card) 12'; Bojinov (yellow card) 19' (goal) 26'; Genkov (yellow card) 60'; Makriev (yellow card) 76'; Starokin (yellow card) 90'; Steven (yellow card) 90' | Stadium: Gradski; Attendance: 1,360; Referee: Ivaylo Stoyanov |

=== Bulgarian Cup ===
| 18 September 2013 First round 1st leg | Levski Sofia | 4–0 | Pirin Gotse Delchev | Sofia |
| 17:30 EEST | Vutov 25'; Rodrigues 44' (pen.); D. Dimov (yellow card) 47'; Yordanov 73'; B. Tsonev (yellow card) 80' (goal) 88' | Report | Kirov (yellow card) 21'; Gaziev (yellow card) 66' (yellow-red card) 90+2' | Stadium: Georgi Asparuhov; Attendance: 630; Referee: Georgi Dimitrov |

| 12 October 2013 First round 2nd leg | Pirin Gotse Delchev | 0–5 (0−9 agg.) | Levski Sofia | Gotse Delchev |
| 16:00 EEST | Gutsev (yellow card) 14' | Report | Starokin 15'; Rodrigues 48', 69'; Genkov 54', 72'; Mulder (yellow card) 64' | Stadium: Gradski; Attendance: 500; Referee: Nikolay Yordanov |

| 16 November 2013 Second round 1st leg | CSKA Sofia | 0–0 | Levski Sofia | Sofia |
| 15:15 (EET) | Popov (yellow card) 32'; Sidibé (yellow card) 78' | Report | M. Ivanov (yellow card) 36'; Bru (yellow card) 75' | Stadium: Vasil Levski National Stadium; Attendance: 11,670; Referee: Tsvetan Krastev |

| 19 December 2013 Second round 2nd leg | Levski Sofia | 0–0 (a.e.t.) (0−0 agg.) (7–6 p) | CSKA Sofia | Sofia |
| 16:00 (EET) | Makriev (yellow card) 41'; Angelov (yellow card) 68'; Touré (yellow card) 77'; Mulder (yellow card) 119' | Report | Chochev (yellow card) 15'; Mendy (yellow card) 41'; V. Iliev (yellow card) 45'; Sidibé (yellow card) 97'; Karachanakov (yellow card) 119' | Stadium: Vasil Levski National Stadium; Attendance: 8,540; Referee: Tsvetan Krastev |
| | Penalties |
| | Rodrigues (penalty scored); Makriev (penalty scored); Touré (penalty missed); Angelov (penalty scored); Vutov (penalty scored); D. Dimov (penalty scored); Bru (penalty missed); Álex Pérez (penalty scored); Mulder (penalty scored) | | (penalty missed) Gargorov; (penalty scored) Karachanakov; (penalty scored) Yanchev; (penalty scored) Popov; (penalty scored) Chochev; (penalty scored) Vasilev; (penalty missed) V. Iliev; (penalty scored) Mendy; (penalty missed) Sidibé |

| 12 March 2014 Quarterfinal 1st leg | Levski Sofia | 3–1 | Botev Plovdiv | Sofia |
| 16:15 EEST | Stachowiak 15' (o.g.); Mulder 25' (yellow card) 80'; Krumov (yellow card) 29'; Bojinov 49'; D. Dimov (yellow card) 76' | Report | Doré 13' (yellow card) 62'; Sprockel (yellow card) 17'; Hristov (yellow card) 31' | Stadium: Georgi Asparuhov; Attendance: 2,250; Referee: Tsvetan Krastev |

| 19 March 2014 Quarterfinal 2nd leg | Botev Plovdiv | 2–0 (3a–3 agg.) | Levski Sofia | Plovdiv |
| 14:00 EEST | Jirsák (yellow card) 45'; Luís Pedro 50'; Younés (yellow card) 59'; Hristov (yellow card) 63'; Doré 72'; Anicet (yellow card) 90' | Report | Bru (yellow card) 26'; Bastos (yellow card) 86'; Krumov (yellow card) 90'; Angelov (yellow card) 90' | Stadium: Botev 1912 Football Complex; Attendance: 2,850; Referee: Stanislav Todorov |

=== UEFA Europa League ===
==== First qualifying round ====
| 4 July 2013 1st leg | Levski Sofia (Bulgaria) | 0–0 | (Kazakhstan) Irtysh | Sofia, Bulgaria |
| 21:00 CEST | Silva (yellow card) 52'; Angelov (yellow card) 74' de Carvalho (penalty missed) 77' | Report | Yurin (yellow card) 6'; Chichulin (yellow card) 48'; Kučera (yellow card) 82' | Stadium: Georgi Asparuhov; Attendance: 10,000; Referee: Orel Grinfeld (Israel) |

| 11 July 2013 2nd leg | Irtysh (Kazakhstan) | 2–0 (2−0 agg.) | (Bulgaria) Levski Sofia | Pavlodar, Kazakhstan |
| CEST | Murzoev 6'; Bakayev 13' (pen.) (yellow card) 66'; Govedarica (yellow card) 20'; Kotlyar (yellow card) 31'; Mukhutdinov (yellow card) 35'; Se. Ivanov (yellow card) 64'; Shabalin (yellow card) 78' | Report | D. Dimov (red card) 12'; Mulder (yellow card) 72'; Iliev (yellow card) 78' | Stadium: Pavlodar Central Stadium; Attendance: 9,000; Referee: Alexander Harkam (Austria) |
