= Zorana =

Zorana is a given name. Notable people with the name include:

- Zorana Arunović (born 1986), Serbian sport shooter
- Zorana Mihajlović (born 1970), Serbian politician
- Zorana Novaković (1935–2016), known professionally as Lola, Serbian singer
- Zorana B. Popovic (born 1962), known professionally as Zoya, Yugoslav-American electrical engineer
- Zorana Todorović (born 1989), Serbian basketball player
