= Antonio Vutov =

Bulgarian footballer

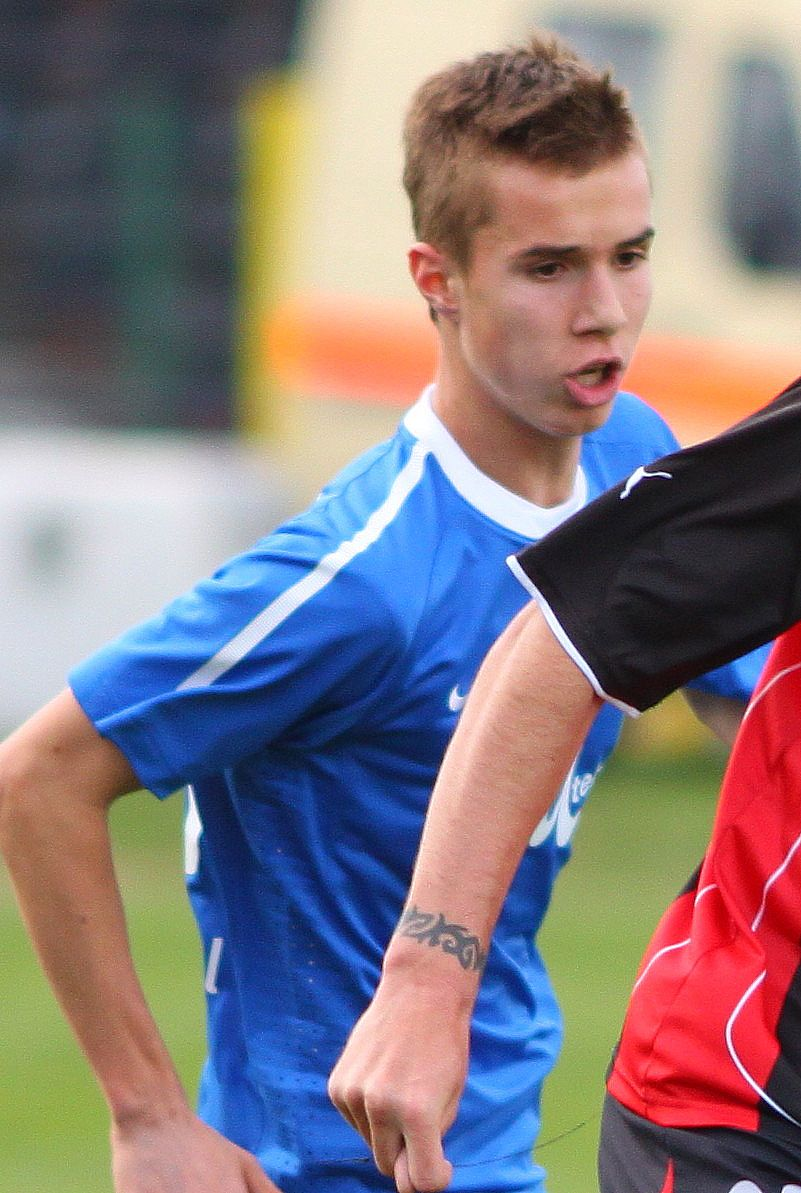
- Vutov playing for Levski Sofia in 2012

Personal information
- Full name: Antonio Ventsislavov Vutov
- Date of birth: 6 June 1996 (age 30)
- Place of birth: Mezdra, Bulgaria
- Height: 1.78 m (5 ft 10 in)
- Positions: Winger; attacking midfielder

Team information
- Current team: Arda Kardzhali
- Number: 39

Youth career
- 2007–2009: Lokomotiv Mezdra
- 2009–2012: Levski Sofia

Senior career*
Years	Team	Apps	(Gls)
2012–2014	Levski Sofia	28	(3)
2014–2018	Udinese	0	(0)
2015–2016	→ Cosenza (loan)	22	(1)
2016–2017	→ Lecce (loan)	9	(0)
2017	→ Botev Plovdiv (loan)	13	(5)
2017–2018	→ Levski Sofia (loan)	26	(2)
2018–2020	Botev Plovdiv	49	(13)
2020–2022	Mezőkövesd	41	(5)
2022–2023	Lokomotiv Sofia	28	(5)
2023–2024	CSKA 1948	23	(0)
2024–2025	Spartak Varna	31	(7)
2025–	Arda Kardzhali	31	(7)

International career^{‡}
2012–2013	Bulgaria U17	6	(2)
2013–2015	Bulgaria U19	15	(5)
2015–2018	Bulgaria U21	22	(2)
2021–	Bulgaria	2	(0)
- * Club domestic league appearances and goals as of 11 June 2026 ‡ National team caps and goals as of 5 August 2021

Antonio Vutov (Bulgarian: Антонио Вутов; born 6 June 1996) is a Bulgarian professional footballer who plays for Arda Kardzhali as an attacking midfielder or winger.

Vutov began his career with Levski Sofia. He joined Serie A club Udinese in January 2014, and had loan spells at Cosenza, Lecce, Botev Plovdiv and Levski before moving permanently to Botev in 2018.

He has also represented Bulgaria internationally at under-17, under-19 and under-21 levels.

== Club career ==
Born in Mezdra, Vutov began his career at his hometown club, Lokomotiv Mezdra. When he was 12 years old he was the captain of the U-15 team of Lokomotiv Mezdra.

=== Levski Sofia ===
In 2009, Vutov joined Levski Sofia Academy. Vutov made his senior debut for Levski on 8 April 2012, in a 1–1 league draw against Lokomotiv Sofia at the age of 15 years and 307 days, making him the youngest player ever to have played for the club. His first start came in a home league game against Beroe Stara Zagora on 11 May.

Vutov's first goal came in a 7–1 win against Etar 1924 at the Georgi Asparuhov Stadium, on 28 November 2012.

For 2013–14 season, Vutov was handed number 10, last worn by Hristo Yovov. He started to play more often as a first-team regular and for six months he made 24 appearances and scored 3 goals in all competitions. Vutov helped Levski to reach the quarterfinals of the Bulgarian Cup after a 7–6 penalty win against CSKA Sofia, he scored one of the penalties for his team.

=== Udinese ===
During the winter break club's boss Todor Batkov announced that Levski were going to sell Vutov to Italian side Udinese. Vutov signed a four-and-a-half-year contract on 9 January and the transfer was officially announced on 11 January 2014 on Udinese's official website. The transfer fee wasn't officially announced but it is believed that Levski got at least €950,000 from the deal. Vutov made his Udinese first-team debut on 18 February, in a 3–0 friendly loss against Hajduk Split at Stadion Poljud, playing 78 minutes.

==== Cosenza (loan) ====
For the 2015–16 season, Vutov was loaned out to Cosenza. He made 22 appearances for the club and scored a goal from the penalty spot.

==== Lecce (loan) ====
On 12 July 2016, Vutov was loaned out by Udinese to Lecce. On 30 July he debuted with the giallorossi and scored his first official goal for the club in a 2–1 win against Alto Vicentino in a Coppa Italia match.

==== Botev Plovdiv (loan) ====
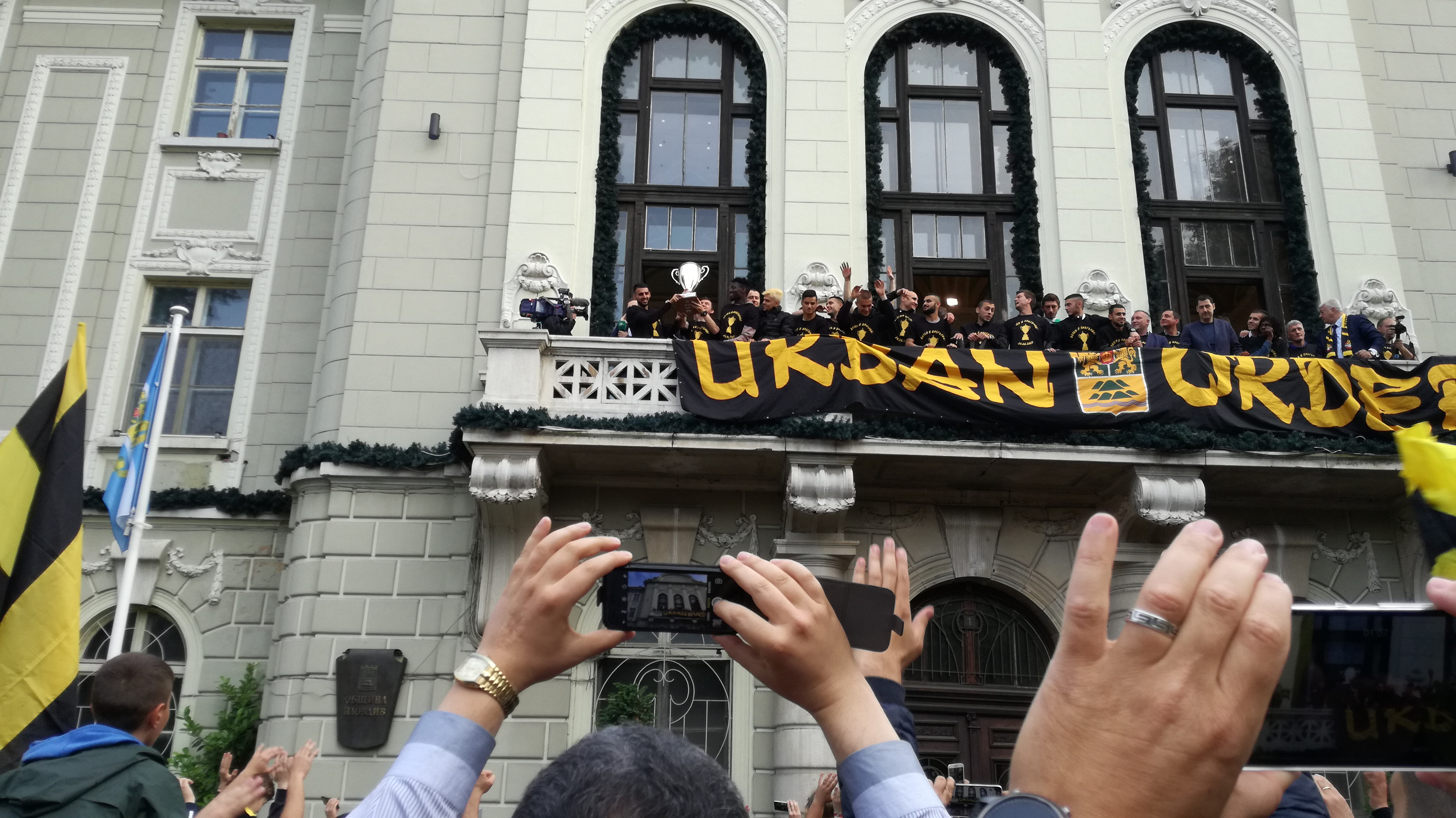
Antonio Vutov and his teammates from Botev Plovdiv celebrating winning the Bulgarian Football Cup in 2017

In January 2017, Vutov was loaned out to Botev Plovdiv for the rest of the season. He made an official debut on 18 February during the 1–0 away win over Lokomotiv Gorna Oryahovitsa.

On 7 April, Vutov scored twice during a 7–1 win over PFC Montana. These were his first goals in any official games as a player of Botev Plovdiv. Couple of weeks later, on 22 April, Vutov scored a spectacular goal for the 3–0 away win over Slavia Sofia.

On 26 April Vutov scored a header after a magnificent assist provided by Todor Nedelev in the 1–1 draw with FC Vereya Stara Zagora during the second leg of the semi-finals for the Bulgarian Cup. His goal secured the win for Botev Plovdiv with 2–1 on aggregate and his team proceeded to the final game.

On 19 May Vutov scored an important goal in the playoffs against Beroe Stara Zagora and Botev Plovdiv won on aggregate 4–2.

On 24 May Vutov scored the second goal for the 2–1 victory over Ludogorets Razgrad helping Botev Plovdiv to win the Bulgarian Cup for the third time in the history of the club.

During his loan in Botev Plovdiv Vutov played 16 games, provided 2 assists and scored 7 goals (2 goals in the Bulgarian Cup tournament).

==== Levski Sofia (loan) ====
On 13 June 2017, Vutov returned to Levski Sofia on a season-long loan.

=== Lokomotiv Sofia ===
In July 2022, Vutov joined Lokomotiv Sofia as a free agent, signing a two-year contract.

=== Arda Kardzhali ===
In June 2025, Vutov signed a three-year contract with Arda Kardzhali. On 7 August 2025, he scored the only goal in the 1:0 away win over Lithuanian team Kauno Žalgiris in a UEFA Conference League qualifying match, which marked Arda's first victory in a European club tournament.

== International career ==
He made his debut for Bulgaria national team on 31 March 2021 in a FIFA World Cup qualifier against Northern Ireland.

== Career statistics ==
As of 13 September 2025

Appearances and goals by club, season and competition
Club	Season	Division	League		Cup		Continental		Other		Total	
Club	Season	Division	Apps	Goals	Apps	Goals	Apps	Goals	Apps	Goals	Apps	Goals
Levski Sofia	2011–12	A Group	5	0	0	0	0	0	–		5	0
Levski Sofia	2012–13	A Group	4	1	6	0	0	0	–		10	1
Levski Sofia	2013–14	A Group	19	2	3	1	2	0	–		24	3
Levski Sofia	Total		28	3	9	1	0	0	0	0	39	4
Udinese	2013–14	Serie A	0	0	0	0	0	0	–		0	0
Udinese	2014–15	Serie A	0	0	0	0	–		–		0	0
Udinese	Total		0	0	0	0	0	0	0	0	0	0
Cosenza (loan)	2015–16	Lega Pro	22	1	2	0	–		–		24	1
Lecce (loan)	2016–17	Lega Pro	9	0	3	1	–		–		12	1
Botev Plovdiv (loan)	2016–17	Bulgarian First League	13	5	4	2	–		–		17	7
Levski Sofia (loan)	2017–18	Bulgarian First League	26	2	5	1	2	0	–		33	3
Botev Plovdiv	2018–19	Bulgarian First League	23	6	6	1	–		–		29	7
Botev Plovdiv	2019–20	Bulgarian First League	22	7	5	0	–		–		27	7
Botev Plovdiv	2020–21	Bulgarian First League	4	0	0	0	–		–		4	0
Botev Plovdiv	Total		49	13	11	1	0	0	0	0	60	14
Mezőkövesdi SE	2020–21	Nemzeti Bajnokság I	27	5	3	1	–		–		30	6
Mezőkövesdi SE	2021–22	Nemzeti Bajnokság I	14	0	1	0	–		–		15	0
Mezőkövesdi SE	Total		41	5	1	0	0	0	0	0	45	6
Lokomotiv Sofia	2022–23	Bulgarian First League	28	5	5	1	–		–		33	6
CSKA 1948	2023–24	Bulgarian First League	27	5	2	0	2	0	1	0	32	0
CSKA 1948 II	2023–24	Bulgarian Second League	3	0	0	0	–		–		3	0
Spartak Varna	2024–25	Bulgarian First League	31	7	2	1	–		–		33	8
Arda Kardzhali	2025–26	Bulgarian First League	6	0	0	0	6	0	–		12	0
Career total			283	31	47	9	12	0	1	0	343	50

== Honours ==
Botev Plovdiv

- Bulgarian Cup: 2016–17

== Personal life ==
Vutov is an avid Real Madrid fan and has cited Zinedine Zidane as his favourite player.
