= Todorići =

Todorići may refer to:

- Todorići, Bileća, a village in Bosnia and Herzegovina
- Todorići, Trebinje, a village in Bosnia and Herzegovina
- Todorići, Šipovo, a village near Šipovo, Bosnia and Herzegovina

== See also ==
- Todorić
