= Todorovski =

Todorovski (Macedonian: Тодоровски) is a Macedonian surname and is the equivalent of the Bulgarian Todorov and the Serbian Todorović. Notable people with this surname include:

- Aleksandar Todorovski (b. 1984) – Macedonian footballer
- Goce Todorovski (b. 1982) – Macedonian footballer
- Goce Todorovski (b. 1951) – Macedonian actor
- Blaže Todorovski (b. 1985) – Macedonian footballer
- Hristijan Todorovski Karposh (1921–1944) – Macedonian communist revolutionary

== See also ==
- Todorović – Serbian form
- Todorov – Bulgarian form
- Theodore – root of surname
