= Todorović =

Todorović (Serbian Cyrillic: Тодоровић, pronounced [todǒːroʋitɕ]) is a Serbian surname derived from a masculine given name Todor. It may refer to:

- Bora Todorović (1930–2014), Serbian actor
- Darko Todorović (born 1997), a Bosnian soccer player
- Dragan Todorović (politician) (born January 25, 1953), a Serbian politician
- Dragan Todorović (writer) (born 1958), a Serbian writer
- Marko Todorović (1929–2000), Serbian actor
- Nenad Todorović (born 1982), a Serbian soccer player
- Ognjen Todorović (born 1989), a Bosnian soccer player
- Srđan Todorović (born 1965), a Serbian actor
- Rade Todorović (born 1974), a retired Serbian soccer player
- Zorana Todorović (born 1989), a Serbian basketball player
