= Todorić =

Todorić is a surname found in Croatia, Bosnia Herzegovina and Serbia, patronymic of Todor.

Notable people with the name include:

- Ivica Todorić (born 1951), Croatian businessman
- Iva Todorić (born 1993), Croatian basketball player
- Dragan Todorić (born 1954), Serbian basketball player

== See also ==
- Todorići (disambiguation)
