= Todorov =

Todorov (Bulgarian: Тодоров), feminine Todorova (Bulgarian: Тодорова) is a Bulgarian surname. Notable people with the name include:

== Athletes ==
- Antoaneta Todorova (born 1963), Bulgarian javelin thrower
- Daniela Todorova (born 1980), Bulgarian Paralympian
- Dimitrinka Todorova (1974–2020), Bulgarian gymnast
- Georgi Todorov (born 1960), Bulgarian shot putter
- Georgi Todorov (born 1951), Bulgarian weightlifter, 1976 Olympics silver medalist
- Nikolay Todorov (footballer, born 1964), Bulgarian football manager
- Nikolay Todorov (footballer, born 1996), Bulgarian footballer
- Rita Todorova (born 1958), Bulgarian rower
- Serafim Todorov (born 1969), Bulgarian boxer
- Stanimir Todorov (born 1982), Bulgarian figure skater
- Stefan Todorov (born 1982), Bulgarian footballer
- Svetlana Todorova (born 1974), Bulgarian gymnast
- Svetoslav Todorov (born 1978), Bulgarian footballer
- Todor Todorov (born 1982), Bulgarian footballer
- Toncho Todorov (born 1958), Bulgarian gymnast
- Yordan Todorov (footballer, born July 1981), Bulgarian footballer
- Yordan Todorov (footballer, born November 1981), Bulgarian footballer
- Yordan Todorov (footballer, born 1999), Bulgarian footballer
- Zdravko Todorov (born 1982), Bulgarian footballer

== Other ==
- Elitsa Todorova (born 1977), Bulgarian neo-folk singer
- Elka Todorova (fl. 2002), Bulgarian academician and writer on sociology and psychology
- Paunka Todorova (born 1930), Bulgarian chess player
- Georgi Todorov (1864–1934), Bulgarian general
- Krisia Todorova (born 2004), Bulgarian child singer and Junior Eurovision Song Contest contestant
- Maria Todorova (born 1949, daughter of Nikolai below), Bulgarian historian (Imagining the Balkans, 1997)
- Mariana Todorova (born 1974), Bulgarian violinist
- Nikolai Todorov (1921–2003), Bulgarian historian; in 1990 acting President of Bulgaria.
- Nayden Todorov (born 1974), Bulgarian pianist, composer, and conductor
- Petko Todorov (1879–1916), Bulgarian writer
- Stanko Todorov (1920–1996), Bulgarian communist politician
- Todor Todorov (sculptor) (born 1951), Bulgarian sculptor
- Tzvetan Todorov (1939–2017), Bulgarian-French historian, philosopher, critic and sociologist

== See also ==
- Fyodorov, Russian cognate
