= Stefan Todorov =

Bulgarian footballer

Personal information
- Date of birth: 9 October 1982 (age 44)
- Place of birth: Bulgaria
- Height: 1.86 m (6 ft 1 in)
- Position: Forward

Senior career*
Years	Team	Apps	(Gls)
- CSKA Sofia
- Akademik Svishtov
- Spartak Pleven
2004	Belite Orli Pleven		
2004	Slavia Sofia	2	(1)
2005	Belasitsa Petrich	14	(2)
2006	Wisła Płock	0	(0)
2006	Unia Janikowo	10	(2)
2007	Toruński KP		
2007	Zdrój Ciechocinek	15	(3)
- * Club domestic league appearances and goals

Stefan Todorov (born 9 October 1982) is a Bulgarian former professional footballer who played as a striker.

Todorov started his career in CSKA Sofia. He joined Wisła Płock in 2006, where he was unable to break into the first squad. In the winter break of the 2006–07 season, he was released from Unia Janikowo.
