= Valeri Georgiev =

Bulgarian footballer

Personal information
- Full name: Valeri Vangelov Georgiev
- Date of birth: 28 July 1984 (age 42)
- Place of birth: Blagoevgrad, Bulgaria
- Height: 1.77 m (5 ft 10 in)
- Positions: Defender; defensive midfielder

Team information
- Current team: Vihren Sandanski
- Number: 3

Senior career*
Years	Team	Apps	(Gls)
2003–2005	Pirin Blagoevgrad	4	(0)
2005–2009	Vihren Sandanski	91	(1)
2010–2014	Lokomotiv Plovdiv	92	(2)
2014	Montana	7	(0)
2016	Septemvri Simitli	9	(1)
2016–	Vihren Sandanski	57	(2)
- * Club domestic league appearances and goals as of 1 August 2020

Valeri Georgiev (Bulgarian: Валери Георгиев; born 28 July 1984) is a Bulgarian footballer, who currently plays as a defender for Vihren Sandanski.

== Career ==
He started his career in home town Blagoevgrad in local team Pirin. On 3 March 2005 Valeri made his official debut in the Bulgarian top division in a match against Spartak Varna. He played for 8 minutes. The result of the match was a 2:0 win for Pirin. Up to the end of season 2004/05 Georgiev played in only 3 matches. In June 2005 he was transferred to FC Vihren Sandanski for a fee of €20 000 and fast becomes part of the titular team. From 2008 Valeri Georgiev is a captain of Vihren.
