= Dimitar Makriev =

Bulgarian footballer

Dimitar Makriev Димитър Макриев
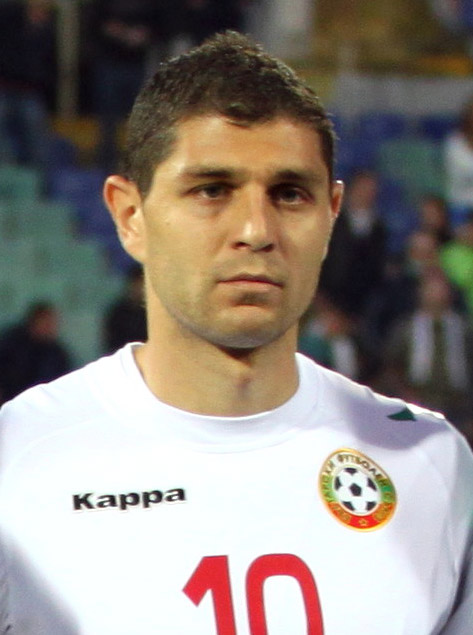
- Makriev with Bulgaria in 2011

Personal information
- Full name: Dimitar Ivanov Makriev
- Date of birth: 7 January 1984 (age 42)
- Place of birth: Gotse Delchev, Bulgaria
- Height: 1.91 m (6 ft 3 in)
- Position: Forward

Senior career*
Years	Team	Apps	(Gls)
2001–2002	Levski Sofia	3	(0)
2002	CSKA Sofia	0	(0)
2002–2005	Inter Milan	0	(0)
2003	→ AC Bellinzona (loan)	14	(4)
2003–2004	→ Górnik Zabrze (loan)	22	(2)
2004–2005	→ Chiasso (loan)	18	(5)
2005–2006	Dijon	6	(0)
2006–2007	Maribor	48	(23)
2008–2011	Ashdod	111	(44)
2011	Krylia Sovetov	5	(0)
2012	Oleksandriya	7	(0)
2012–2013	Ashdod	22	(9)
2013–2014	Levski Sofia	26	(7)
2014	South China	1	(1)
2015	Pécsi MFC	10	(2)
2015–2018	Nea Salamina	92	(31)
2018	Arda Kardzhali	11	(6)
2019	Ermis Aradippou	14	(0)
2019	PO Xylotymbou	9	(0)
2021–2022	Vihren Sandanski		

International career
2009–2011	Bulgaria	8	(1)
- * Club domestic league appearances and goals

Dimitar Ivanov Makriev (Bulgarian: Димитър Иванов Макриев; born 7 January 1984) is a Bulgarian former professional footballer who played as a forward.

== Club career ==
=== Youth career ===
Makriev was raised in Levski Sofia's youth teams. In 2002, he signed a contract with Levski's rival CSKA Sofia.

=== Inter Milan ===
Few days after signing Makriev, CSKA Sofia sold him to Internazionale. However, he spend the first part of 2002–03 season in CSKA, because Italian Federation froze transfers of foreigners from outside the European Union. After that he played on loan for Swiss AC Bellinzona, Polish Górnik Zabrze and Swiss FC Chiasso. In season 2005–06, he was a part of French Dijon FCO.

=== Maribor ===
In 2006, Makriev signed with NK Maribor. For two seasons, Makriev earned 48 appearances playing in the Slovenian PrvaLiga, scoring 23 goals.

=== Ashdod ===
In January 2008, Ashdod signed Makriev on a two-and-a-half-year deal. He was given the number 7 shirt. Makriev helped the team save themselves from relegation to the second league in Israel. In 18 games, he scored 11 goals. During the 2008–09 season, Makriev scored 11 goals.

=== Krylia Sovetov Samara ===
On 19 May 2011, Ashdod accepted an offer for Makriev from Russian Premier League club Krylia Sovetov Samara. On the next day, he passed his medical and signed a three-year deal that will keep him with the club until 2014.

=== Levski Sofia ===
In late August 2013, Makriev returned to Bulgaria and signed a one-year contract (with the option for an additional year) with Levski Sofia.

=== South China ===
On 22 August 2014, he moved to Hong Kong team South China AA on a free transfer. However, he had left the club on 10 October 2014 by mutual consent.

=== Nea Salamina ===
On 12 July 2015, Makriev signed a contract with Cypriot First Division club Nea Salamina. He appeared in all of Nea Salamina's league matches and scored 19 goals in the 2015–16 season, finishing as the league's top scorer alongside Fernando Cavenaghi and André Alves.

=== Arda Kardzhali ===
On 30 July 2018, Makriev signed a contract with the newly promoted Second League team Arda Kardzhali.

=== Vihren Sandanski ===
In August 2021, Makriev joined Vihren Sandanski.

== International career ==
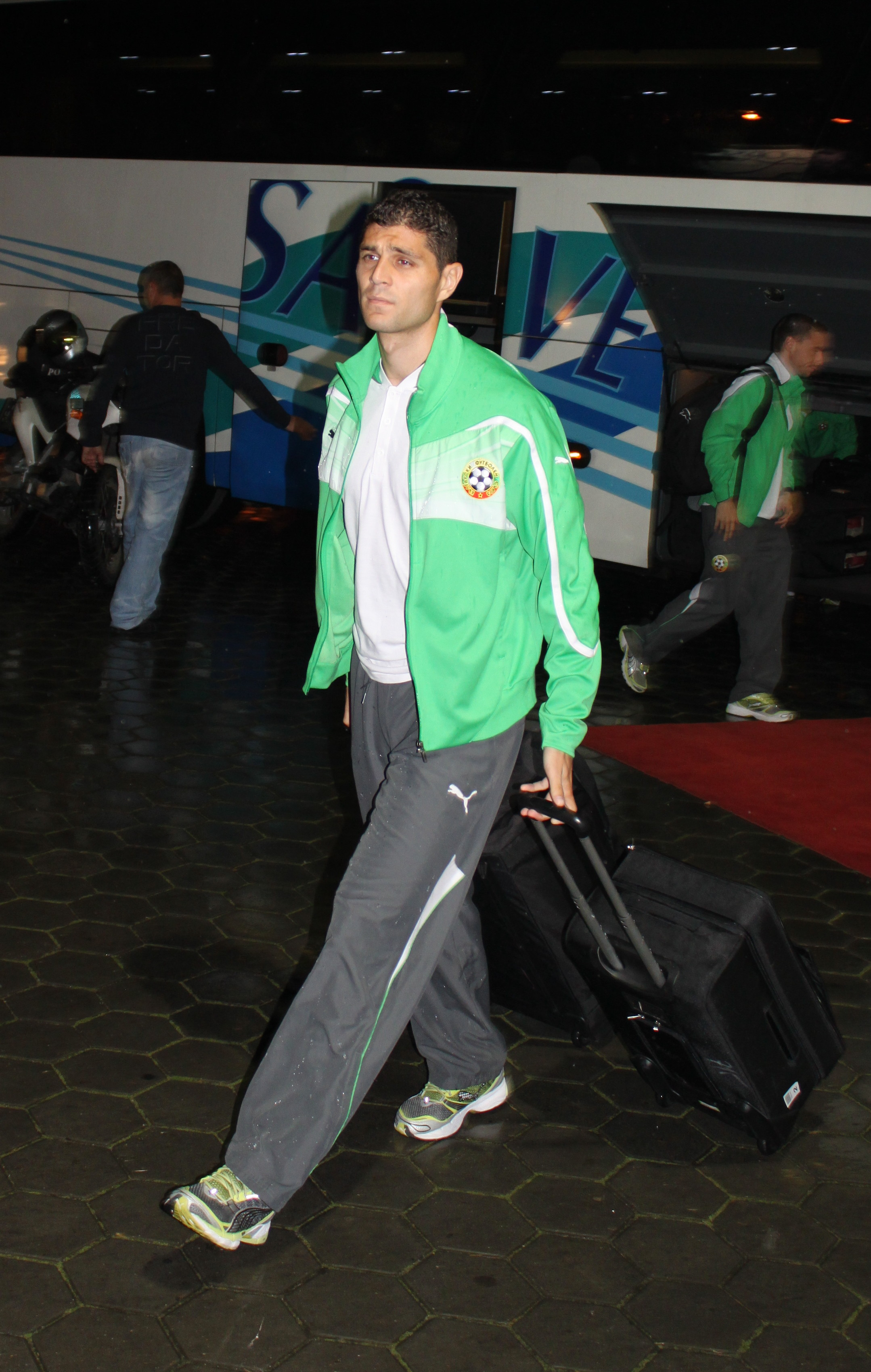
Makriev with Bulgaria

On 28 March 2009, Makriev received his first call-up to the Bulgarian national team for a 2010 FIFA World Cup qualifier against Ireland. A few days later, on 1 April, he scored his first goal for Bulgaria against Cyprus.

== Career statistics ==
=== Club ===
As of match played in January 2020

Appearances and goals by club, season and competition
Club	Season	League			National cup (Note: Includes both Cup, league cup and Supercup matches, where applicable.)		Europe (Note: Includes UEFA Champions League, UEFA Europa League and UEFA Intertoto Cup.)		Total	
Club	Season	Division	Apps	Goals	Apps	Goals	Apps	Goals	Apps	Goals
Levski Sofia	2000–01	A Group	1	0	0	0	0	0	1	0
Levski Sofia	2001–02	A Group	2	0	1	0	0	0	3	0
Levski Sofia	Total		3	0	1	0	0	0	4	0
CSKA Sofia	2002–03	A Group	0	0	0	0	0	0	0	0
Inter Milan	2002–03	Serie A	0	0	0	0	0	0	0	0
Bellinzona (loan)	2002–03	Nationalliga B	14	4			—		14	4
Górnik Zabrze (loan)	2003–04	Ekstraklasa	22	2	1	0	—		23	2
Chiasso (loan)	2004–05	Swiss Challenge League	18	5			—		18	5
Dijon	2005–06	Ligue 2	6	0			—		6	0
Maribor	2006–07	Slovenian PrvaLiga	29	13	4	5	0	0	33	18
Maribor	2007–08	Slovenian PrvaLiga	19	10	2	2	4	3	25	15
Maribor	Total		48	23	6	7	4	3	58	33
Ashdod	2007–08	Israeli Premier League	18	11	1	0	—		19	11
Ashdod	2008–09	Israeli Premier League	31	11	10	2	—		41	13
Ashdod	2009–10	Israeli Premier League	34	13	9	5	—		43	18
Ashdod	2010–11	Israeli Premier League	28	9	5	6	—		33	15
Ashdod	Total		111	44	25	13	0	0	136	57
Krylia Sovetov	2011–12	Russian Premier League	5	0	0	0	—		5	0
Oleksandriya	2011–12	Ukrainian Premier League	7	0	0	0	—		7	0
Ashdod	2012–13	Israeli Premier League	22	9	3	0	—		25	9
Levski Sofia	2013–14	A Group	26	7	4	0	0	0	30	7
South China	2014–15	Hong Kong Premier League	1	1	0	0	—		1	1
Pécsi	2014–15	NB I	10	2	0	0	—		10	2
Nea Salamis	2015–16	Cypriot First Division	36	19	1	0	—		37	19
Nea Salamis	2016–17	Cypriot First Division	35	10	2	1	—		37	11
Nea Salamis	2017–18	Cypriot First Division	21	2	4	2	—		25	4
Nea Salamis	Total		92	31	7	3	0	0	99	34
Arda Kardzhali	2018–19	Second League	11	6	1	0	—		12	6
Ermis Aradippou	2018–19	Cypriot First Division	14	0	3	3	—		17	3
P.O. Xylotymbou	2019–20	Cypriot Second Division	9	0	0	0	—		9	0
Career total			419	134	52	26	4	3	475	163

=== International ===
Dimitar Makriev: International Goals
#	Date	Venue	Opponent	Score	Result	Competition
1.	1 April 2009	Sofia, Bulgaria	Cyprus	2–0	2–0	World Cup 2010 Qual.

== Honours ==
Levski Sofia

- A Group: 2000–01

Individual

- Cypriot First Division top scorer: 2015–16
