= Todor Todorov =

Todor Todorov may refer to:

- Todor Todorov (bobsleigh) (born 1961), Bulgarian bobsledder
- Todor Todorov (gymnast) (1928–2023), Bulgarian Olympic gymnast
- Todor Todorov (sculptor) (born 1951), Bulgarian sculptor
- Todor Todorov (footballer, born May 1982), Bulgarian football goalkeeper
- Todor Todorov (footballer, born November 1982), Bulgarian football defender
- Todor Todorov (weightlifter) (born 1948), Bulgarian Olympic weightlifter
- Todor Todorov (chess player) (born 1974), Bulgarian chess grandmaster
