= Zorana Todorović =

Serbian basketball player

Zorana Todorovic
Personal information
- Born: December 30, 1989 (age 36) Vršac, Yugoslavia
- Listed height: 2.09 m (6 ft 10 in)

Career information
- WNBA draft: 2011: undrafted
- Position: Center

Career history
- Vojvodina
- 2010–2011: Jedinstvo Tuzla
- 2015–2018: Vojvodina

Zorana Todorović (Serbian Cyrillic: Зорана Тодоровић; born December 30, 1989) is a Serbian women's basketball player.

Todorović in one interview made clear her fondness of her height and expressed her wish to grow taller than Poland's Margo Dydek and thus become the world's tallest female basketball player. She is one of the tallest women in Europe. Todorovic takes a size 50 European shoe (UK size 15).
