= Todor Batkov =

Bulgarian businessman and lawyer

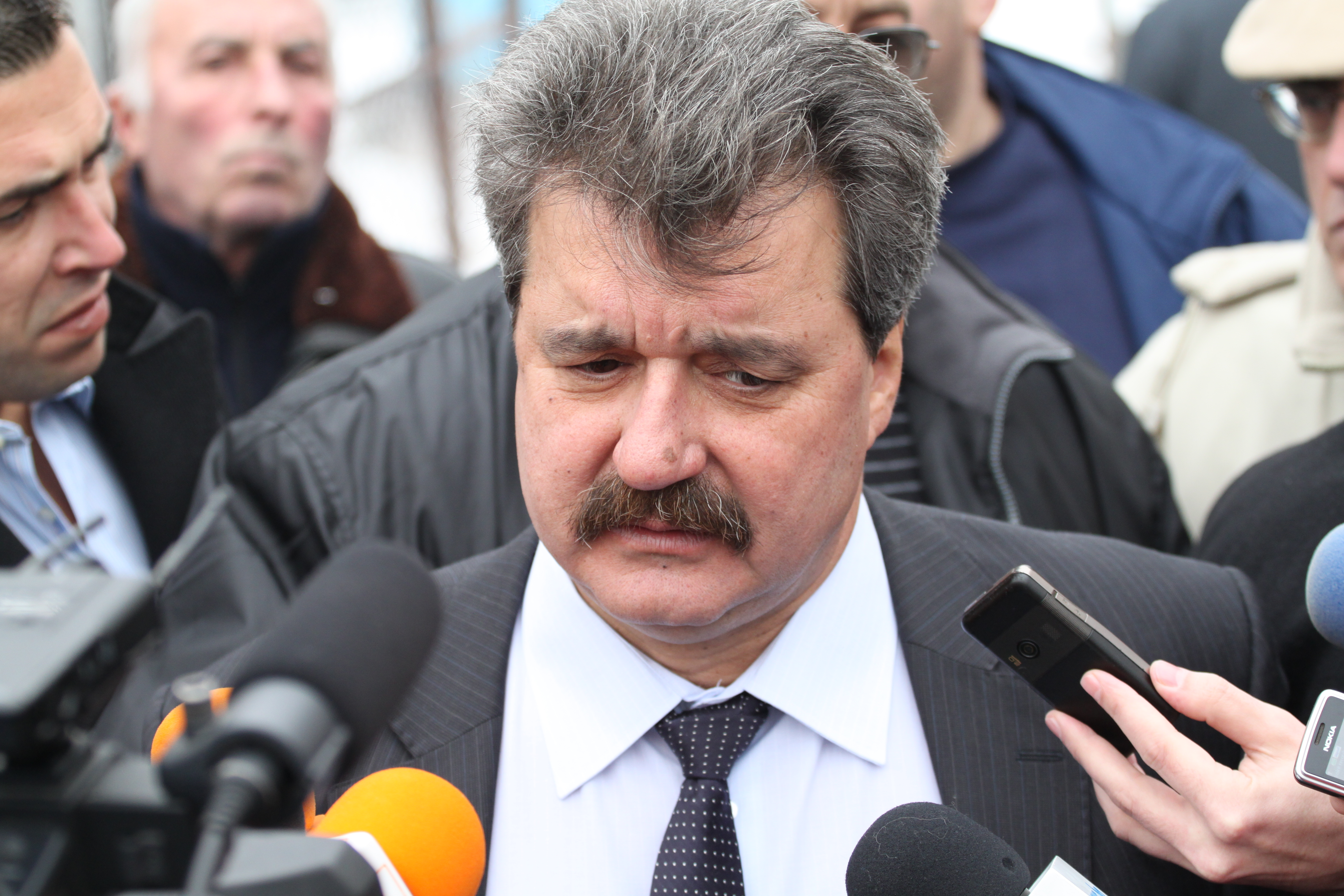
Todor Batkov

Todor Kostadinov Batkov (Bulgarian: Тодор Костадинов Батков; born 17 October 1958 in Smolyan) is a Bulgarian businessman and lawyer who was president of the Bulgarian football club PFC Levski Sofia until late June 2015.

== Biography ==
Since June 1990, Batkov has been a managing partner of the Batkov, Stoev, Botev and Co. company of lawyers. He is a member of the College of Barristers, the International Lawyer's League and the Supervising Council of Mobiltel. Batkov is also the Chairman of the Board of Directors of Standard News Ltd, publisher of the Standart newspaper. Batkov was also formerly a legal adviser at the Bulgarian Council of Ministers.

Batkov has been the president of Levski Sofia since the summer of 1998, becoming the de facto owner as the majority shareholder of the team in March 2004 when he officially replaced Michael Cherney in that capacity. Batkov stepped down on 24 June 2015, with three businessmen (Ivo Tonev, Aleksandar Angelov and Nikolay Iliev) obtaining his shares in the team. He remains the longest serving president of Levski Sofia in the club's history.

On 30 March 2006, Batkov caused controversy when in the post-match interview following Levski Sofia's 1–3 home defeat against German side FC Schalke 04, he said that English referee Mike Riley was a "British homosexual [who] broke the game!" (Bulgarian: "Този британски педераст развали мача!"), referring to the red card Riley gave to Levski midfielder Cédric Bardon. Batkov was subsequently fined 5000 Swiss francs and banned from attending the next 2 Levski games in any UEFA tournaments. In August 2008, some of his remarks in relation to the identity of the BATE Borisov football team as well as the country of Belarus attracted criticism among the press and a number of politicians in the former Soviet state.

On 17 October 2008, Batkov was awarded the Order of Stara Planina (1st class) by then president Georgi Parvanov for his contributions to the preservation of Bulgarian cultural heritage and the enhancement of the reputation of Bulgarian sport.

He is married to Zdravka. They have two daughters and a son.
