= 2014–15 FC Lokomotiv Gorna Oryahovitsa season =

Lokomotiv GO
2014–15 season
- Chairman: Boncho Genchev
- Manager: Sasho Angelov
- B Group: 3rd Place
- Bulgarian Cup: 1/4 finals

The 2014–15 season was FC Lokomotiv Gorna Oryahovitsa's returning season for the club in professional football after a decade long pause.

== First-team squad ==
Note: Flags indicate national team as defined under FIFA eligibility rules; some limited exceptions apply. Players may hold more than one non-FIFA nationality.

No.	Pos.	Nation	Player
—	GK	BUL	Radoslav Rashkov 15/0
—	GK	BUL	Plamen Hristanov
—	GK	BUL	Ivan Hristov
—	DF	BUL	Mariyan Ivanov 14/0
—	DF	BUL	Ivan Penev 14/2
—	DF	BUL	Atanas Fidanin 14/0
—	DF	BUL	Aleksandar Goranov 10/1
—	MF	BUL	Krasen Trifonov 13/0
—	MF	BUL	Yavor Genchev 10/0
—	MF	BUL	Yordan Apostolov 14/1
—	MF	BUL	Iliya Karapetrov 13/4
—	MF	BUL	Ivaylo Mihaylov 2/0

No.	Pos.	Nation	Player
—	MF	BUL	Denislav Mitsakov 14/0
—	MF	BUL	Plamen Iliev
—	MF	BUL	Ivaylo Velchev
—	MF	BUL	Antoniy Balakov 15/7
—	MF	BUL	Radoslav Baytchev 1/0
—	MF	BUL	Atanas Dimitrov 12/1
—	FW	BUL	Lyubomir Genchev 15/4
—	FW	BUL	Nikolay Ivanov 8/1
—	FW	BUL	Dobrin Petrov 1/0
—	FW	BUL	Yanaki Smirnov 14/14

== Fixtures ==
=== League ===
02.08.2014 1	Lokomotiv GO	1–2	Pirin Razlog	Gorna Oryahovitsa
18:00	A.Balakov-'68.		E.Tuntev-'28, V.Kaptiev-'67	Stadium: Lokomotiv Stadium; Attendance: 2,000

09.08.2014 2	Lokomotiv Mz	0–4	Lokomotiv GO	Mezdra
18:00		Savina Stoyanova	Y.Smirnov-'43, L.Genchev-'67, A.Balakov-'86, Karapetrov-'89.	Stadium: Lokomotiv Stadium; Attendance: 2000; Referee: Aleksandar Kostadinov

16.08.2014 3	Lokomotiv GO	4–3	Sozopol	Gorna Oryahovitsa
18:00	A.Balakov-'3-pen., Y.Smirnov-'28,'68, Karapetrov-'89.		Kanev-'26, I.Rusev-'33, At.Dimitrov-'78-own	Stadium: Lokomotiv Stadium; Attendance: 2000; Referee: Borislav Kolev

23.08.2014 4	Lokomotiv GO	1–2	Pirin Bl	Gorna Oryahovitsa
18:00	Y.Smirnov-'45-pen.		Hadzhiivanov-'79; G.Georgiev-'90.	Stadium: Lokomotiv Stadium; Attendance: 2000

30.08.2014 5	Rakovski	0–3	Lokomotiv GO	Rakovski
18:00			Y.Smirnov-'36,'62, A.Balakov-'81.	Stadium: Stadium Legia; Referee: Vihren Manev

13.09.2014 6	Lokomotiv GO	2–0	Chernomorets	Gorna Oryahovitsa
17:00	Y.Smirnov-'33, L.Genchev-'83.			Stadium: Lokomotiv Stadium; Attendance: 1500; Referee: Vladimir Valkov

20.09.2014 7	Vereya	2–3	Lokomotiv GO	Stara Zagora
19:00	Dzhuneyt Yashar-'52, A.Kostov-'86.		Y.Smirnov-'6, L.Genchev-'80-pen., Y.Smirnov-'84-pen.	Stadium: Trace Arena; Referee: Kalin Lyudmilov

28.09.2014 8	Lokomotiv GO	2–2	FC Bansko	Gorna Oryahovitsa
17:00	Penev-'40, Y.Smirnov-'75.		Y.Ivanov-'52, K.Slaev-'70	Stadium: Lokomotiv Stadium; Referee: Nikola Popov

03.10.2014 9	Dobrudzha	3–4	Lokomotiv GO	Dobrich
16:00	Stanoev-'56, Tsachev-'77, E.Kolev-'89		Y.Smirnov-'33, Apostolov-'43, Karapetrov-'83; Y.Smirnov-'90.	Stadium: Druzhba Stadium

18.10.2014 10	Lokomotiv GO	3–2	Botev Vratsa	Gorna Oryahovitsa
16:00	Karapetrov-'18, Goranov-'31, Penev-'84		V.Kaloyanov-'62,'86.	Stadium: Lokomotiv Stadium

24.10.2014 11	Spartak Varna	0–2	Lokomotiv GO	Varna
16:00			A.Balakov-'24,'40.	Stadium: Spartak Stadium; Attendance: 250; Referee: Stefan Pavlov

02.11.2014 12	Lokomotiv GO	2–0	FC Septemvri Simitli	Gorna Oryahovitsa
14:30	At.Dimitrov-'7, Y.Smirnov-'25.			Stadium: Lokomotiv Stadium

08.11.2014 13	Montana	2–0	Lokomotiv GO	Montana
14:30	M.Antonov-'10, Minchev-'30.			Stadium: Ogosta Stadium

22.11.2014 14	Lokomotiv GO	2–1	PFC Burgas	Gorna Oryahovitsa
14:30	N.Ivanov-'57, A.Balakov-'90.		Lyubenov-'72	Stadium: Lokomotiv Stadium

29.11.2014 15	FC Botev Galabovo	1–2	Lokomotiv GO	Galabovo
14:30			L.Genchev-'72, Y.Smirnov-'77.	Stadium: Energetik

=== League standings ===
Pos	Team	Pld	W	D	L	GF	GA	GD	Pts	Promotion or relegation
1	Montana (C, P)	30	25	3	2	72	16	+56	78	Promotion to 2015–16 A Group
2	Pirin Blagoevgrad (P)	30	17	10	3	52	15	+37	61	Promotion to 2015–16 A Group
3	Lokomotiv Gorna Oryahovitsa	30	18	5	7	60	34	+26	59	
4	Bansko	30	14	11	5	38	18	+20	53	
5	Dobrudzha Dobrich	30	13	7	10	41	28	+13	46	

Source: bulgarian-football.com
Rules for classification: 1st points; 2nd head-to-head points; 3rd head-to-head goal difference; 4th head-to-head goals scored; 5th goal difference; 6th number of goals scored; 7th Fair-play points; 8th Draw
(C) Champions; (P) Promoted

=== Bulgarian Cup ===
==== First round ====
24.09.2014	Manastirishte 2000	1–4	Lokomotiv GO	Krivodol
16:00	Simeonov-'48-pen.		Y.Smirnov-'21; M.Ivanov-'24; Fidanin-'28; A.Balakov-'40	Stadium: Hristo Botev; Referee: Georgi Ginchev

==== First leg ====
29.10.2014	Lokomotiv GO	1–1	Dunav	Gorna Oryahovitsa
14:30	Mitsakov-'90		Chakarov-'44	Stadium: Lokomotiv Stadium; Attendance: 500

==== Second leg ====
06.12.2014	Dunav	0–1	Lokomotiv GO	Ruse
13:00			Iliya Karapetrov-'54.	Stadium: Gradski Stadium; Attendance: 1,000
