= 2014–15 Bulgarian Cup =

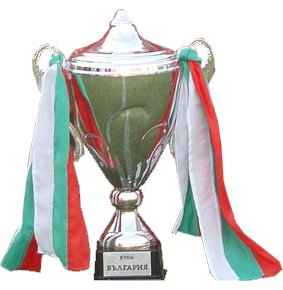
- Bulgarian cup

Tournament details
- Country: Bulgaria

Final positions
- Champions: Cherno More Varna (1st title)
- Runners-up: Levski Sofia

Tournament statistics
- Matches played: 45
- Goals scored: 142 (3.16 per match)

The 2014–15 Bulgarian Cup was the 33rd official season of the Bulgarian annual football knockout tournament. The competition began on 23 September 2014 with the matches of the First Round and finished with the final on 28 May 2015. Ludogorets Razgrad were the defending champions, but lost to Levski Sofia in the semifinals.

Cherno More Varna, the winner of the competition, qualified for the second qualifying round of the 2015–16 UEFA Europa League.

== Participating clubs ==
The following teams competed in the cup:
(Teams still active are in bold)

| **2014–15 A Group** all clubs | **2014–15 B Group** all clubs | **Winners of 4 regional competitions** |
| Ludogorets Razgrad; CSKA Sofia; Litex Lovech; Botev Plovdiv; **Levski Sofia**; **Cherno More Varna**; Lokomotiv Plovdiv; Beroe Stara Zagora; Slavia Sofia; Lokomotiv Sofia; Marek Dupnitsa; Haskovo | Chernomorets Burgas; Dobrudzha Dobrich; Montana; Bansko; Botev Vratsa; Pirin Razlog; Spartak Varna; Rakovski; Botev Galabovo; Sozopol; Pirin Blagoevgrad; Lokomotiv 2012 Mezdra; Burgas; Vereya Stara Zagora; Septemvri Simitli; Lokomotiv Gorna Oryahovitsa | from North-West zone: Manastirishte 2000; from North-East zone: Dunav Ruse; from South-East zone: Atletik Kuklen; from South-West zone: Pirin Gotse Delchev |

== First round ==
The draw was conducted on 10 September 2014. The games will be played on 23–25 September 2014. On this stage all of the participants start their participation i.e. the 12 teams from A PFG (first division), the 16 teams from the B PFG (second division) and the 4 winners from the regional amateur competitions.

| 23 September 2014 | Lokomotiv 2012 Mezdra **(II)** | **0–4** | **Botev Plovdiv** | Mezdra |
| 16:00 | | Report | Tsvetkov 57'; Ognyanov 70'; Kolev 80'; Yusein 85' | Stadium: Lokomotiv; Attendance: 150; Referee: Petar Dorovski (Pleven) |

| 23 September 2014 | Spartak Varna **(II)** | **1–7** | **Levski Sofia** | Varna |
| 16:00 | Malchev 90+2' | Report | Ivanov 8'; Tsonev 24'; Kraev 40', 53', 89'; Misyak 73'; Domovchiyski 76' | Stadium: Spartak; Attendance: 460; Referee: Viktor Valkov (Plovdiv) |

| 23 September 2014 | Vereya Stara Zagora **(II)** | **0–2** | **Lokomotiv Plovdiv** | Stara Zagora |
| 16:00 | | Report | Zhelev 13' (o.g.); Sandanski 29' | Stadium: Beroe; Attendance: 330; Referee: Radoslav Stanev (Varna) |

| 24 September 2014 | **Montana (II)** | **2–1** (a.e.t.) | CSKA Sofia | Montana |
| 15:45 | Antonov 80'; S. Georgiev 105' | Report | Silva 73' | Stadium: Ogosta; Attendance: 2,360; Referee: Aleksandar Kostadinov (Sofia) |

| 24 September 2014 | Pirin Razlog **(II)** | **0–1** | **Lokomotiv Sofia** | Sofia |
| 16:00 | | Report | Manolov 66' | Stadium: Lokomotiv; Attendance: 280; Referee: Tihomir Aleksov (Sofia) |

| 24 September 2014 | **Dunav Ruse (III)** | **4–0** | Rakovski **(II)** | Ruse |
| 16:00 | Radentsov 22' (pen.); Vasev 24'; Chakarov 28'; Budinov 85' | Report | | Stadium: Gradski; Attendance: 500; Referee: Petar Kirilov (Dobrich) |

| 24 September 2014 | Sozopol **(II)** | **0–2** | **Cherno More Varna** | Sozopol |
| 16:00 | | Report | Petkov 42'; Manolov 82' | Stadium: Arena Sozopol; Attendance: 590; Referee: Georgi Ignatov (Sofia) |

| 24 September 2014 | Burgas **(II)** | **0–1** | **Beroe Stara Zagora** | Burgas |
| 16:00 | | Report | Kostov 67' | Stadium: Balgarovo; Attendance: 350; Referee: Stoyan Denev (Veliko Tarnovo) |

| 24 September 2014 | Manastirishte 2000 **(IV)** | **1–4** | **Lokomotiv Gorna Oryahovitsa (II)** | Krivodol |
| 16:00 | Simeonov 48' (pen.) | Report | Smirnov 21'; M. Ivanov 24'; Fidanin 28'; Balakov 40' | Stadium: Hristo Botev; Attendance: 400; Referee: Georgi Ginchev (Pavlikeni) |

| 24 September 2014 | Atletik Kuklen **(IV)** | **0–6** | **Bansko (II)** | Kuklen |
| 16:00 | | Report | R. Ivanov 6'; Bengyuzov 52'; Fikiyn 55', 60'; Stoyanov 87'; Stankev 90' | Stadium: San Mames; Attendance: 450; Referee: Boyan Slavkov (Plovdiv) |

| 24 September 2014 | **Botev Galabovo (II)** | **1–0** | Marek Dupnitsa | Galabovo |
| 16:00 | Vinkov 43' | Report | | Stadium: Energetik; Attendance: 400; Referee: Rumen Hristov (Pleven) |

| 24 September 2014 | Septemvri Simitli **(II)** | **1–3** | **Haskovo** | Simitli |
| 16:00 | Kosturkov 53' | Report | Chanev 10'; Kovachev 29'; Aleksiev 90' | Stadium: Struma; Attendance: 430; Referee: Volen Chinkov (Sofia) |

| 24 September 2014 | **Pirin Gotse Delchev (III)** | **3–0** | Dobrudzha Dobrich **(II)** | Gotse Delchev |
| 16:00 | Paskov 31', 77'; Ibrahim 62' | Report | | Stadium: Gradski; Attendance: 250; Referee: Radoslav Gidzhenov (Plovdiv) |

| 24 September 2014 | Chernomorets Burgas **(II)** | **1–3** | **Slavia Sofia** | Burgas |
| 18:00 | Hristov 76' (pen.) | Report | Valchanov 4'; Savić 58'; Dyakov 81' | Stadium: Lazur; Attendance: 100; Referee: Martin Stoimenov (Sofia) |

| 24 September 2014 | Botev Vratsa **(II)** | **1–5** | **Ludogorets Razgrad** | Razgrad |
| 18:45 | Petkov 55' | Report | Quixadá 21', 68'; Hernández 25', 39'; Savić 57' (o.g.) | Stadium: Ludogorets Arena; Attendance: 1,340; Referee: Dragomir Draganov (Varna) |

| 25 September 2014 | Pirin Blagoevgrad **(II)** | **1–2** (a.e.t.) | **Litex Lovech** | Blagoevgrad |
| 18:00 | Zlatinov 90+2' (pen.) | Report | Vajushi 79' (pen.); Jordán 92' | Stadium: Hristo Botev; Attendance: 3,250; Referee: Vihren Manev (Sofia) |

== Second round ==
The draw was conducted on 2 October 2014. The first legs are to be played on 28, 29 October 2014 and 15 February 2015, the second legs should be on 3, 6 December 2014 and 22 February 2015. On this stage the participants will be the 16 winners from the first round.

=== First legs ===
| 28 October 2014 | **Cherno More Varna** | **2–0** | **Slavia Sofia** | Varna |
| 14:30 | Sténio 45+4'; Rasim 62' | Report | | Stadium: Ticha; Attendance: 380; Referee: Georgi Yordanov (Gabrovo) |

| 28 October 2014 | **Lokomotiv Plovdiv** | **1–1** | **Botev Plovdiv** | Plovdiv |
| 17:45 | Kamburov 44' | Report | Kolev 90+2' | Stadium: Lauta; Attendance: 3,070; Referee: Nikola Popov (Sofia) |

| 28 October 2014 | **Litex Lovech** | **3–1** | **Pirin Gotse Delchev (III)** | Lovech |
| 18:00 | Bozhikov 35'; Asprilla 82'; Vajushi 85' (pen.) | Report | Kirev 57' | Stadium: Lovech; Attendance: 300; Referee: Martin Stoimenov (Sofia) |

| 29 October 2014 | **Montana (II)** | **2–0** | **Levski Sofia** | Montana |
| 14:00 | S. Georgiev 42'; Minchev 57' | Report | | Stadium: Ogosta; Attendance: 950; Referee: Stanislav Todorov (Shumen) |

| 29 October 2014 | **Botev Galabovo (II)** | **1–4** | **Lokomotiv Sofia** | Galabovo |
| 14:30 | Chehoudi 29' (o.g.) | Report | Ranđelović 11', 33'; Tom 39'; Chehoudi 48' | Stadium: Energetik; Attendance: 440; Referee: Georgi Kabakov (Plovdiv) |

| 29 October 2014 | **Haskovo** | **3–0** | **Bansko (II)** | Haskovo |
| 14:30 | Chipilov 9'; Aleksiev 13'; Kyamil 60' | Report | | Stadium: Haskovo; Attendance: 90; Referee: Adrian Petrov (Sofia) |

| 29 October 2014 | **Lokomotiv Gorna Oryahovitsa (II)** | **1–1** | **Dunav Ruse (III)** | Gorna Oryahovitsa |
| 14:30 | Mitsakov 90' | Report | Chakarov 45' | Stadium: Lokomotiv; Attendance: 500; Referee: Radan Miryanov (Varna) |

| 15 February 2015 | **Beroe Stara Zagora** | **2–1** | **Ludogorets Razgrad** | Stara Zagora |
| 13:00 | Elias 31'; Mapuku 71' | Report | Espinho 61' | Stadium: Beroe; Attendance: 3,770; Referee: Ivaylo Stoyanov (Petrich) |

=== Second legs ===
| 12 November 2014 | Pirin Gotse Delchev **(III)** | **0–4** (**1–7** agg.) | **Litex Lovech** | Gotse Delchev |
| 13:00 | | Report | Jordán 7'; Kolev 31', 73'; Minchev 80' | Stadium: Gradski; Attendance: 350; Referee: Stoyan Denev (Veliko Tarnovo) |

| 14 November 2014 | **Lokomotiv Sofia** | **5–1** (**9–2** agg.) | Botev Galabovo **(II)** | Sofia |
| 13:00 | Manolov 1'; Vasev 32'; Genov 74', 79', 90' | Report | Toshev 18' | Stadium: Lokomotiv; Attendance: 80; Referee: Dragomir Draganov (Varna) |

| 3 December 2014 | Botev Plovdiv | **1–2** (**2–3** agg.) | **Lokomotiv Plovdiv** | Plovdiv |
| 13:00 | Tsvetkov 82' | Report | Filipov 84'; Karagaren 90' | Stadium: Botev 1912 Football Complex; Attendance: 2,400; Referee: Georgi Kabakov (Plovdiv) |

| 3 December 2014 | Bansko **(II)** | **2–0** (**2–3** agg.) | **Haskovo** | Bansko |
| 13:00 | Stankev 10'; Bengyuzov 50' | Report | | Stadium: St. Peter; Attendance: 160; Referee: Martin Stoimenov (Sofia) |

| 3 December 2014 | Slavia Sofia | **2–2** (**2–4** agg.) | **Cherno More Varna** | Sofia |
| 13:00 | Manzorro 42'; Fonseca 72' | Report | Manolov 33'; Petkov 45' | Stadium: Ovcha Kupel; Attendance: 50; Referee: Ivaylo Stoyanov (Petrich) |

| 3 December 2014 | **Levski Sofia** | **4–0** (**4–2** agg.) | Montana **(II)** | Sofia |
| 16:00 | Añete 12' (pen.); Belaïd 38'; Domovchiyski 66'; Bedoya 90' | Report | | Stadium: Georgi Asparuhov; Attendance: 960; Referee: Nikolay Yordanov (Sofia) |

| 6 December 2014 | Dunav Ruse **(III)** | **0–1** (**1–2** agg.) | **Lokomotiv Gorna Oryahovitsa (II)** | Ruse |
| 13:00 | | Report | Karapetrov 54' | Stadium: Gradski; Attendance: 1,050; Referee: Tasko Taskov (Sofia) |

| 22 February 2015 | **Ludogorets Razgrad** | **1–0** (**2a–2** agg.) | Beroe Stara Zagora | Razgrad |
| 15:30 | Quixadá 8' | Report | | Stadium: Ludogorets Arena; Attendance: 4,350; Referee: Stanislav Stavrov (Veliko Tarnovo) |

== Quarter-finals ==
The draw was conducted on 16 December 2014. The first legs were played on 21/22 February and 4 March, the second legs were on 4 and 18 March 2015. On this stage the participants are the 8 winners from the third round.

=== First legs ===
| 21 February 2015 | **Cherno More Varna** | **1–0** | **Lokomotiv Gorna Oryahovitsa (II)** | Varna |
| 13:00 | Rasim 90+2' | Report | | Stadium: Ticha; Attendance: 1,340; Referee: Martin Aleksandrov (Sofia) |

| 21 February 2015 | **Levski Sofia** | **3–0** | **Haskovo** | Sofia |
| 17:00 | Domovchiyski 23' (pen.), 35'; Trifonov 90' (o.g.) | Report | | Stadium: Georgi Asparuhov; Attendance: 3,750; Referee: Stefan Apostolov (Blagoevgrad) |

| 22 February 2015 | **Lokomotiv Plovdiv** | **2–1** | **Lokomotiv Sofia** | Plovdiv |
| 12:30 | Trajanov 9'; Lasimant 60' | Report | Chehoudi 14' | Stadium: Lauta; Attendance: 2,170; Referee: Stanislav Todorov (Shumen) |

| 4 March 2015 | **Litex Lovech** | **0–0** | **Ludogorets Razgrad** | Lovech |
| 17:30 | | Report | | Stadium: Lovech; Attendance: 1,940; Referee: Stanislav Todorov (Shumen) |

=== Second legs ===
| 3 March 2015 | Haskovo | **1–1** (**1–4** agg.) | **Levski Sofia** | Haskovo |
| 14:00 | Malamov 81' | Report | Gikiewicz 42' | Stadium: Haskovo; Attendance: 1,440; Referee: Angel Bayaltsaliev (Sofia) |

| 4 March 2015 | Lokomotiv Sofia | **1–2** (**2–4** agg.) | **Lokomotiv Plovdiv** | Sofia |
| 14:00 | Trayanov 43' | Report | Lasimant 32'; Delev 54' | Stadium: Lokomotiv; Attendance: 720; Referee: Nikolay Yordanov (Sofia) |

| 5 March 2015 | Lokomotiv Gorna Oryahovitsa **(II)** | **0–5** (**0–6** agg.) | **Cherno More Varna** | Gorna Oryahovitsa |
| 14:00 | | Report | Burkhardt 2'; Kotev 23'; Coulibaly 26'; Bijev 38'; Sténio 45' | Stadium: Lokomotiv; Attendance: 2,190; Referee: Vladimir Valkov (Plovdiv) |

| 18 March 2015 | **Ludogorets Razgrad** | **5–0** (**5–0** agg.) | Litex Lovech | Razgrad |
| 17:30 | Dyakov 12'; Espinho 26'; Barthe 62'; Misidjan 85'; Abalo 90+3' | Report | | Stadium: Ludogorets Arena; Attendance: 1,920; Referee: Tasko Taskov (Sofia) |

== Semi-finals ==
The draw was conducted on 19 March 2015. The first legs will be played on 8 April, the second legs are on 29 April 2015. On this stage the participants will be the 4 winners from the Quarterfinals.

=== First legs ===
| 7 April 2015 | **Cherno More Varna** | **5–1** | **Lokomotiv Plovdiv** | Varna |
| 17:00 | Raykov 3'; Bijev 44'; Venkov 48'; Coureur 58'; Bacari 77' | Report | Bourabia 69' | Stadium: Ticha; Attendance: 1,600; Referee: Tasko Taskov (Sofia) |

| 8 April 2015 | **Ludogorets Razgrad** | **0–0** | **Levski Sofia** | Razgrad |
| 19:00 | | Report | | Stadium: Ludogorets Arena; Attendance: 5,250; Referee: Tsvetan Krastev (Varna) |

=== Second legs ===
| 28 April 2015 | Lokomotiv Plovdiv | **2–3** (**3–8** agg.) | **Cherno More Varna** | Plovdiv |
| 19:00 | Delev 39'; Coulibaly 67' (o.g.) | Report | Atanasov 4'; Coureur 89', 90+1' | Stadium: Lauta; Attendance: 380; Referee: Stefan Pavlov (Burgas) |

| 29 April 2015 | **Levski Sofia** | **1–0** (**1–0** agg.) | Ludogorets Razgrad | Sofia |
| 18:45 | Añete 90+1' | Report | | Stadium: Georgi Asparuhov; Attendance: 12,300; Referee: Ivaylo Stoyanov (Petrich) |

== Final ==
30 May 2015
20:00 EEST

| Levski Sofia | 1–2 (a.e.t.) | Cherno More Varna |
|---|---|---|
| Añete 72' | Report | Bacari 90+2'; Coureur 119' |

Lazur Stadium, Burgas
Attendance: 13,910
Referee: Ivaylo Stoyanov (Petrich)

== See also ==
- 2014–15 A Group
- 2014–15 B Group
- 2014–15 V AFG
