= 2015–16 A Group =

92nd season of season of top-tier football league in Bulgaria

A Group
- Season: 2015–16
- Dates: 17 July 2015 – 28 May 2016
- Champions: Ludogorets Razgrad (5th title)
- Relegated: Litex Lovech (expelled)
- Champions League: Ludogorets Razgrad
- Europa League: Levski Sofia; Beroe; Slavia Sofia
- Matches: 144
- Goals: 317 (2.2 per match)
- Top goalscorer: (Bulgaria) Martin Kamburov (18)
- Biggest home win: Montana 6–0 Botev Plovdiv
- Biggest away win: Slavia Sofia 0–5 Ludogorets
- Highest scoring: Beroe 5–2 Lokomotiv Plovdiv
- All statistics correct as of 28 May 2016.

The 2015–16 A Group was the 92nd season of the top division of the Bulgarian football league system, and 68th since a league format was adopted for the national competition of A Group as a top tier of the pyramid. The season has started on 17 July 2015 and ended in 28 May 2016. The league is contested by ten teams. Ludogorets Razgrad were the defending champions, and successfully defended the title after Levski Sofia's home loss against Lokomotiv Plovdiv in the 29th round. The title is Ludogorets' fifth consecutive and overall.

== Competition format ==
The league is contested by ten teams and will be played in a quadruple round robin format, with each team playing every other team four times over 36 rounds.

== Teams ==
A total of 12 teams were set to contest the league, including the best 10 sides from the previous season, plus two promoted clubs from the lower division B Group.

On 22 June 2015, the BFU announced the final list of participants for the 2015–16 season. CSKA Sofia and Lokomotiv Sofia were both denied a professional license for the following season due to outstanding debts and would have to compete in the V AFG or fold. The group was kept at 10 teams. Marek Dupnitsa and Haskovo, who finished in the bottom two places of the table at the end of previous season, also failed to receive professional license, and were relegated to V Group.

The relegated teams were replaced by Montana, the 2014–15 B Group champions and Pirin Blagoevgrad, the 2014–15 B Group runner-up. While Montana returns to the top division after two years, Pirin reaches again the highest class after 4 years.

=== Stadia and locations ===
Note: Table lists in alphabetical order.

Location of teams in 2015–16 A Group
Sofia 2015–16 A Group football clubs

Team	Location	Stadium	Capacity (seating)
Beroe	Stara Zagora	Beroe	12,128
Botev	Plovdiv	Botev 1912 Football Complex	4,000
Cherno More	Varna	Ticha	8,250
Levski	Sofia	Georgi Asparuhov	25,000
Litex	Lovech	Gradski	8,100
Lokomotiv	Plovdiv	Lokomotiv	10,000
Ludogorets	Razgrad	Ludogorets Arena	7,500
Montana	Montana	Ogosta	6,000
Pirin	Blagoevgrad	Hristo Botev	7,000
Slavia	Sofia	Slavia	25,556

=== Personnel and sponsoring ===
Note: Flags indicate national team as has been defined under FIFA eligibility rules. Players and Managers may hold more than one non-FIFA nationality.

Team	Manager	Captain	Kit manufacturer	Shirt sponsor
Beroe	(Bulgaria) Plamen Lipenski (caretaker)	(Bulgaria) Ivo Ivanov	Uhlsport	BEROE, Refan
Botev Plovdiv	(Bulgaria) Nikolay Kostov	(Bulgaria) Yordan Hristov	Uhlsport	efbet
Cherno More	(Bulgaria) Nikola Spasov	(Bulgaria) Mihail Venkov	Uhlsport	Armeets
Levski Sofia	(Serbia) Ljupko Petrović	(Bulgaria) Veselin Minev	Joma	Vivacom, efbet, Strabag
Litex Lovech	(Bulgaria) Lyuboslav Penev	(Bulgaria) Anton Nedyalkov	adidas	Prima
Lokomotiv Plovdiv	(Bulgaria) Ilian Iliev	(Bulgaria) Martin Kamburov	Uhlsport	efbet
Ludogorets Razgrad	(Bulgaria) Georgi Dermendzhiev	(Bulgaria) Svetoslav Dyakov	Macron	eCasino.bg, Vivacom
Montana	(Bulgaria) Emil Velev	(Bulgaria) Hristo Ivanov	Jako	Montana Municipality
Pirin Blagoevgrad	(Kosovo) Naci Şensoy	(Bulgaria) Yuliyan Popev	Joma	Lafka
Slavia Sofia	(Russia) Aleksandr Tarkhanov	(Bulgaria) Georgi Petkov	Joma	Asset Insurance, efbet

=== Managerial changes ===
Team	Outgoing manager	Manner of departure	Date of vacancy	Position in table	Incoming manager	Date of appointment
Pirin Blagoevgrad	(Bulgaria) Ivo Trenchev	End of caretaker tenure	31 May 2015	Pre-season	(Bulgaria) Nedelcho Matushev	6 June 2015
Ludogorets Razgrad	(Bulgaria) Georgi Dermendzhiev	Resigned	31 May 2015	Pre-season	(Portugal) Bruno Ribeiro	17 June 2015
Litex Lovech	(Bulgaria) Krasimir Balakov	Resigned	11 July 2015	Pre-season	(Serbia) Ljupko Petrović (interim)	12 July 2015
Botev Plovdiv	(Bulgaria) Petar Penchev	Sacked	25 July 2015	9th	(Slovenia) Ermin Šiljak	27 July 2015
Litex Lovech	(Serbia) Ljupko Petrović (interim)	Resigned	5 August 2015	1st	(Romania) Laurențiu Reghecampf	5 August 2015
Ludogorets Razgrad	(Portugal) Bruno Ribeiro	Sacked	2 September 2015	1st	(Bulgaria) Eduard Eranosyan	2 September 2015
Pirin Blagoevgrad	(Bulgaria) Nedelcho Matushev	Resigned	26 September 2015	10th	(Kosovo) Naci Şensoy	14 October 2015
Ludogorets Razgrad	(Bulgaria) Eduard Eranosyan	Resigned	6 November 2015	3rd	(Bulgaria) Georgi Dermendzhiev	6 November 2015
Montana	(Bulgaria) Ferario Spasov	Resigned	8 November 2015	9th	(Bulgaria) Emil Velev	11 November 2015
Botev Plovdiv	(Slovenia) Ermin Šiljak	Resigned	9 November 2015	8th	(Bulgaria) Nikolay Kostov	11 November 2015
Slavia Sofia	(Bulgaria) Ivan Kolev	Resigned	30 November 2015	6th	(Bulgaria) Vladimir Ivanov (caretaker)	30 November 2015
Litex Lovech	(Romania) Laurențiu Reghecampf	Signed by (Romania) Steaua București	3 December 2015	3rd	(Serbia) Ljupko Petrović (interim)	3 December 2015
Slavia Sofia	(Bulgaria) Vladimir Ivanov	End of caretaker tenure	18 December 2015	5th	(Russia) Aleksandr Tarkhanov	18 December 2015
Litex Lovech	(Serbia) Ljupko Petrović (interim)	End of contract	23 December 2015	10th	(Bulgaria) Lyuboslav Penev	22 January 2016
Lokomotiv Plovdiv	(Bulgaria) Hristo Kolev	Mutual agreement	26 February 2016	7th	(Bulgaria) Ilian Iliev	26 February 2016
Beroe	(Bulgaria) Petar Hubchev	Sacked	7 April 2016	4th	(Bulgaria) Plamen Lipenski (caretaker)	8 April 2016
Levski Sofia	(Bulgaria) Stoycho Stoev	Mutual agreement	13 May 2016	2nd	(Serbia) Ljupko Petrović	17 May 2016

== League table ==
Pos	Team	Pld	W	D	L	GF	GA	GD	Pts	Qualification or relegation
1	Ludogorets Razgrad (C)	32	21	7	4	55	21	+34	70	Qualification for the Champions League second qualifying round
2	Levski Sofia	32	16	8	8	36	18	+18	56	Qualification for the Europa League second qualifying round
3	Beroe	32	14	11	7	37	27	+10	53	Qualification for the Europa League first qualifying round
4	Slavia Sofia	32	14	7	11	36	29	+7	49 (Note: Slavia Sofia ahead of Lokomotiv Plovdiv on head-to-head record; Slavia Sofia–Lokomotiv Plovdiv 3–0, Lokomotiv Plovdiv–Slavia Sofia 2–0, Slavia Sofia–Lokomotiv Plovdiv 3–0, Lokomotiv Plovdiv–Slavia Sofia 3–1.)	Qualification for the Europa League first qualifying round
5	Lokomotiv Plovdiv	32	15	4	13	40	45	−5	49	
6	Cherno More	32	10	8	14	36	45	−9	38	
7	Botev Plovdiv	32	8	9	15	27	44	−17	33	
8	Pirin Blagoevgrad	32	5	11	16	27	45	−18	26	
9	Montana (O)	32	4	9	19	23	43	−20	21	Qualification for the relegation playoff
10	Litex Lovech (D, R, R, R)	0	0 (8)	0 (9)	0 (3)	0 (29)	0 (19)	—	0	Expelled and relegated to the Second League (Note: On 16 December 2015, Litex Lovech were expelled from the league after their players left the field in protest over referee decisions in a match against Levski Sofia on 12 December 2015. On 20 January 2016 it was announced that Litex Lovech would be relegated to B Group All results from played matches involving Litex Lovech were annulled on 22 January 2016.)

Source: Bulgarian Football Association, Soccerway
Rules for classification: 1) Points; 2) Head-to-head points; 3) Head-to-head goal difference; 4) Head-to-head goals scored; 5) Head-to-head away goals scored (only if two teams); 6) Goal difference; 7) Goals scored; 8) Fairplay ranking; 9) Draw.
(C) Champions; (D) Disqualified; (O) Play-off winners; (R) Relegated

== Results ==
Matches 1–18
Home \ Away	BSZ	BOT	CHM	LEV	LIT	LPL	LUD	MON	PIR	SLA
Beroe		0–0	1–1	1–0		2–0	0–0	0–0	1–0	1–2
Botev Plovdiv	1–3		2–1	1–1		1–1	0–1	1–0	1–0	0–1
Cherno More	0–3	1–2		0–1		2–1	2–3	1–0	1–0	1–0
Levski Sofia	2–0	1–0	1–0			1–0	1–1	2–0	0–0	2–0
Litex Lovech										
Lokomotiv Plovdiv	1–2	2–1	1–3	1–0			2–0	1–0	2–1	2–0
Ludogorets Razgrad	5–0	2–1	1–1	2–0		1–0		2–0	0–0	1–1
Montana	1–0	6–0	0–4	0–2		2–0	1–1		1–1	1–2
Pirin Blagoevgrad	0–1	0–1	1–1	1–0		3–0	0–3	0–0		0–3
Slavia Sofia	0–0	2–0	0–1	0–1		3–0	0–1	1–0	0–0	

Source: bulgarian-football.com
Legend: Blue = home team win; Yellow = draw; Red = away team win.

Matches 19–36
Home \ Away	BSZ	BOT	CHM	LEV	LIT	LPL	LUD	MON	PIR	SLA
Beroe		1–1	0–0	2–1		5–2	0–2	2–1	3–1	1–1
Botev Plovdiv	0–1		3–1	0–0		1–0	2–1	2–2	2–2	0–1
Cherno More	1–0	3–0		0–2		1–1	0–2	1–1	1–1	3–2
Levski Sofia	1–0	3–0	5–1			2–3	0–0	0–0	3–1	0–1
Litex Lovech										
Lokomotiv Plovdiv	1–1	2–1	2–1	1–1			2–1	2–0	4–2	3–1
Ludogorets Razgrad	0–2	1–0	2–1	2–1		2–0		2–1	4–1	3–1
Montana	1–3	1–1	3–2	0–1		0–1	0–1		0–1	0–3
Pirin Blagoevgrad	1–1	2–2	4–0	0–1		1–2	1–3	0–0		0–3
Slavia Sofia	0–0	1–0	0–0	0–0		3–0	0–5	3–1	1–2	

Source: bulgarian-football.com
Legend: Blue = home team win; Yellow = draw; Red = away team win.

== Relegation playoff ==
4 June 2016
19:00 EEST

Montana	2–1	Pomorie
S. Georgiev 54'; Iliev 86'	Report	Bozhinov 73' (pen.)

Trace Arena, Stara Zagora
Attendance: 1,500
Referee: Nikola Popov (Sofia)

== Positions by round ==
Team ╲ Round	1	2	3	4	5	6	7	8	9	10	11	12	13	14	15	16	17	18	19	20	21	22	23	24	25	26	27	28	29	30	31	32	33	34	35	36
Beroe	7	4	2	2	4	4	2	3	5	6	4	4	4	4	3	4	4	4	3	4	2	3	4	3	3	4	4	4	3	3	3	3	3	3	3	3
Botev Plovdiv	3	9	8	7	8	7	6	8	8	9	8	9	8	8	8	8	8	8	8	7	6	6	6	6	5	5	5	7	6	7	7	7	7	7	7	7
Cherno More	4	7	6	8	7	6	7	6	6	5	6	5	6	6	6	6	5	5	6	5	5	5	5	5	6	6	6	6	7	6	6	6	6	6	6	6
Levski Sofia	5	6	7	6	5	5	5	4	3	3	1	1	1	1	1	1	1	2	2	2	3	2	2	2	2	2	2	2	2	2	2	2	2	2	2	2
Litex Lovech	2	3	1	1	1	2	4	1	1	1	3	2	3	2	2	2	2	3	4	10	10	10	10	10	10	10	10	10	10	10	10	10	10	10	10	10
Lokomotiv Plovdiv	10	10	9	9	9	9	9	9	9	8	9	7	7	7	7	7	7	7	7	6	7	7	7	7	7	7	7	5	5	5	5	5	5	5	5	5
Ludogorets Razgrad	9	5	4	4	3	1	1	2	2	2	2	3	2	3	4	3	3	1	1	1	1	1	1	1	1	1	1	1	1	1	1	1	1	1	1	1
Montana	8	2	5	5	6	8	8	7	7	7	7	8	9	9	9	9	9	10	10	9	9	9	9	9	9	9	9	9	9	9	9	9	9	9	9	9
Pirin Blagoevgrad	6	8	10	10	10	10	10	10	10	10	10	10	10	10	10	10	10	9	9	8	8	8	8	8	8	8	8	8	8	8	8	8	8	8	8	8
Slavia Sofia	1	1	3	3	2	3	3	5	4	4	5	6	5	5	5	5	6	6	5	3	4	4	3	4	4	3	3	3	4	4	4	4	4	4	4	4

Updated to match(es) played on 28 May 2016. Source: en.bulgarian-football.com

== Season statistics ==
Round	Goal of the week	Club
1	(Colombia) Danilo Aspirilla vs Ludogorets	Litex
2	(Cape Verde) Sténio vs Ludogorets	Cherno More
3	(Bulgaria) Georgi Bozhilov vs Pirin Blagievgrad	Beroe
4	(Bulgaria) Aleksandar Kolev vs Pirin Blagievgrad	Botev Plovdiv
5	(Bulgaria) Atanas Zehirov vs Cherno More	Beroe
6	(Bulgaria) Aleksandar Vasilev vs Pirin Blagievgrad	Ludogorets
7	(Bulgaria) Bozhidar Vasev vs Cherno More	Botev Plovdiv
8	(Portugal) Arsénio Nunes vs Botev Plovdiv	Litex
9	(Bulgaria) Ivan Minchev vs Slavia	Montana
10	(Bulgaria) Georgi Kostadinov vs Botev Plovdiv	Levski Sofia
11	(Slovakia) Roman Procházka vs Litex	Levski Sofia
12	(Romania) Claudiu Keșerü vs Levski Sofia	Ludogorets
13	(Bulgaria) Atanas Zehirov vs Slavia	Beroe
14	(Serbia) Nemanja Milisavljević vs Cherno More	Beroe
15	(Bulgaria) Atanas Zehirov vs Botev Plovdiv	Beroe
16	(France) Igor Djoman vs Litex	Beroe
17	(Slovakia) Roman Procházka vs Slavia	Levski Sofia
18	(Bulgaria) Spas Delev vs Levski Sofia	Beroe
19	(Bulgaria) Strahil Popov vs Ludogorets	Litex
20	(Bulgaria) Georgi Dinkov vs Lokomotiv Plovdiv	Beroe
21	(Serbia) Nemanja Milisavljević vs Pirin Blagoevgrad	Beroe
22	(Spain) Miguel Bedoya vs Cherno More	Levski Sofia
23	(Russia) Serder Serderov vs Botev Plovdiv	Slavia
24	(Bulgaria) Georgi Andonov vs Botev Plovdiv	Beroe
25	(Bulgaria) Ventsislav Hristov vs Pirin Blagoevgrad	Levski Sofia
26	(Bulgaria) Marcelinho vs Beroe	Ludogorets
27	(Bulgaria) Martin Kamburov vs Pirin Blagoevgrad	Lokomotiv Plovdiv
28	(Slovakia) Roman Procházka vs Botev Plovdiv	Levski Sofia
29	(Serbia) Nemanja Milisavljević vs Lokomotiv Plovdiv	Beroe
30	(Bulgaria) Stefan Velev vs Botev Plovdiv	Lokomotiv Plovdiv
31	(Bulgaria) Ventsislav Hristov vs Cherno More	Levski Sofia
32	(Bulgaria) Emil Gargorov vs Ludogorets	Lokomotiv Plovdiv
33	(Bulgaria) Ventsislav Hristov vs Lokomotiv Plovdiv	Levski Sofia
34	(Bulgaria) Georgi Iliev vs Botev Plovdiv	Cherno More
35	(Bulgaria) Martin Kamburov vs Cherno More	Lokomotiv Plovdiv
36	(Bulgaria) Veselin Marchev vs Pirin Blagoevgrad	Lokomotiv Plovdiv

=== Top scorers ===
Rank	Scorer	Club	Goals
1	(Bulgaria) Martin Kamburov	Lokomotiv Plovdiv	18
2	(Romania) Claudiu Keșerü	Ludogorets Razgrad	15
3	(Martinique) Mathias Coureur	Cherno More	11
4	(Bulgaria) Martin Toshev	Pirin Blagoevgrad	10
5	(Brazil) Wanderson	Ludogorets Razgrad	9
6	(Bulgaria) Ventsislav Hristov	Levski Sofia	8
7	(Bulgaria) Marcelinho	Ludogorets Razgrad	7
7	(Bulgaria) Ivaylo Dimitrov	Slavia Sofia	7
7	(Bulgaria) Lachezar Baltanov	Botev Plovdiv	7
7	(Brazil) Jonathan Cafu	Ludogorets Razgrad	7
7	(Bulgaria) Borislav Baldzhiyski^{1}	Slavia Sofia	7
12	(Bulgaria) Anton Karachanakov	Slavia Sofia	6
12	(Slovakia) Roman Procházka	Levski Sofia	6
12	(Bulgaria) Ivan Minchev	Montana	6
12	(Bulgaria) Ismail Isa	Beroe Stara Zagora	6
12	(Spain) Miguel Bedoya	Levski Sofia	6

Note

^{1} Including 2 goals for Montana.

_{Updated on 28 May 2016}

==== Hat-tricks ====
Player	For	Against	Result	Date
(Bulgaria) Ivan Minchev	Montana	Botev Plovdiv	6–0	25 July 2015
(Bulgaria) Martin Kamburov	Lokomotiv Plovdiv	Pirin Blagoevgrad	4–2	1 April 2016
(Bulgaria) Ventsislav Hristov	Levski Sofia	Cherno More	5–1	28 April 2016

_{Updated on 28 April 2016}

==== Clean sheets ====
- Levski Sofia – 13
- Ludogorets – 12
- Slavia Sofia – 12
- Beroe – 11

== Transfers ==
- List of Bulgarian football transfers summer 2015
- List of Bulgarian football transfers winter 2015–16

== Attendances ==
#	Club	Average	Highest
1	Levski	3,558	12,500
2	Ludogorets	3,000	7,000
3	Beroe	2,491	5,200
4	Pirin	2,438	4,100
5	Botev	2,194	3,500
6	Lokomotiv Plovdiv	1,959	6,700
7	Cherno More	1,619	4,300
8	Montana	1,491	3,600
9	Lovech	1,334	5,800
10	Slavia Sofia	595	3,600
