= Zlatko Bonev =

Bulgarian retired footballer

Personal information
- Full name: Zlatko Ivaylov Bonev
- Date of birth: 9 June 1994 (age 32)
- Place of birth: Bulgaria
- Height: 1.78 m (5 ft 10 in)
- Position: Defensive midfielder

Youth career
- Lokomotiv Sofia
- Pirin Razlog

Senior career*
| Years | Team | Apps | (Gls) |
| 2013–2014 | Pirin Razlog | 6 | (0) |
| 2014 | → Vidima-Rakovski (loan) | 11 | (0) |
| 2014–2015 | Marek Dupnitsa | 15 | (2) |
| 2015 | Ludogorets Razgrad II | 4 | (0) |
| 2015 | Ludogorets Razgrad | 0 | (0) |
| 2016 | Lokomotiv Mezdra | 8 | (1) |
| 2016 | Lokomotiv Sofia | 4 | (1) |
| Total | | 48 | (4) |
- * Club domestic league appearances and goals as of 13 December 2016

Zlatko Ivaylov Bonev (Bulgarian: Златко Ивайлов Бонев; born 8 April 1994) is a Bulgarian retired footballer, who plays as a midfielder.

== Career ==
=== Ludogorets Razgrad ===
Bonev joined the reserve team of Ludogorets for their first season in B group. After two matches he was called up to the 1st team. On 23 September 2015 he made his debut for Ludogorets first team in a match against Lokomotiv 1929 Mezdra for the Bulgarian Cup, won by Ludogorets by 5:0, but at the end of the year he was released from the team.

=== Lokomotiv 2012 Mezdra ===
On 19 February 2016 it was announced that Bonev had joined the B Group team Lokomotiv 2012 Mezdra.

== Club statistics ==
As of 8 December 2015

| Club | Season | Division | League | | Cup | | Europe | | Total | |
| Club | Season | Division | Apps | Goals | Apps | Goals | Apps | Goals | Apps | Goals |
|---|---|---|---|---|---|---|---|---|---|---|
| Pirin Razlog | 2012–13 | B Group | 6 | 0 | 1 | 0 | – | | 7 | 0 |
| Vidima-Rakovski (loan) | 2013–14 | North-West V Group | 11 | 0 | – | | – | | 11 | 0 |
| Marek Dupnitsa | 2014–15 | A Group | 15 | 2 | 1 | 0 | – | | 16 | 2 |
| Ludogorets Razgrad II | 2015–16 | B Group | 4 | 0 | – | | – | | 4 | 0 |
| Ludogorets Razgrad | 2015–16 | A Group | 0 | 0 | 1 | 0 | 0 | 0 | 1 | 0 |
| Career Total | | | 36 | 2 | 3 | 0 | 0 | 0 | 39 | 2 |
