= 2014–15 A Group =

91st season of top-tier football league in Bulgaria

A Group
- Season: 2014–15
- Dates: 19 July 2014 – 31 May 2015
- Champions: Ludogorets Razgrad (4th title)
- Relegated: Marek; Haskovo; CSKA Sofia (administratively); Lokomotiv Sofia (administratively)
- Champions League: Ludogorets Razgrad
- Europa League: Beroe; Litex Lovech; Cherno More (via Bulgarian Cup)
- Matches: 132
- Goals: 336 (2.55 per match)
- Top goalscorer: (Spain) Añete (14 goals)
- Biggest home win: Levski Sofia 8–0 Haskovo (27 February 2015)
- Biggest away win: Haskovo 0–5 Levski Sofia (4 May 2015)
- Highest scoring: Levski 8-0 Haskovo (27 February 2015)
- Longest winning run: 5 games CSKA Sofia
- Longest unbeaten run: 14 games CSKA Sofia
- Longest winless run: 15 games Haskovo
- Longest losing run: 11 games Haskovo

The 2014–15 A Group was the 91st season of the top division of the Bulgarian football league system, and 67th since a league format was adopted for the national competition of A Group as a top tier of the pyramid.

The competition was divided in two phases - Regular season, with every team playing against every other team twice, and Playoffs, with teams divided into Championship group (top six) and Relegation group (bottom six) to determine the champions and the relegated teams, respectively.

Ludogorets Razgrad entered the season as three-time defending champions, and succeeded to retain the title for a 4th consecutive and overall time 2 rounds before the end of the season, after their home win over Lokomotiv Sofia.

Beroe Stara Zagora finished second, while Lokomotiv Sofia claimed the third place.

Marek Dupnitsa and Haskovo survived only one season in A Group and were relegated. This season was controversial, because both CSKA Sofia and Lokomotiv Sofia were relegated to the third tier of Bulgarian football, due to financial problems, which prevented them from obtaining a professional license for the next season. This was the first time that CSKA was relegated from the top flight since 1948, which meant rivals Levski remained the only club to have never been relegated. Lokomotiv on the other hand, was relegated for the first time since 1971.

== Competition format ==
The championship is divided in two phases.

In the first phase, the Regular season, every team must play two times against each of the other eleven teams on home-away basis for a subtotal of 22 matches.

In the second phase, the Play-offs, the teams are divided in two groups - Championship group (first six) and Relegation group (bottom six). In those two parallel played groups every team has to play two times, again on home-away basis, only against the remaining five teams in the group for a subtotal of 10 matches.

Thus, the season has a total of 32 fixtures.

At the end of the season, the champion earns a place in the 2015/16 UEFA Champions League qualifying rounds, while the next two or three clubs in the final standings in the league table (depending on the winner of the 2014–15 Bulgarian Cup) earn the right to play in 2015/16 UEFA Europa League qualifying rounds. The last two teams in the table (from 11th to 12th place) are directly relegated to B Group for the next season while two clubs from the lower division are promoted.

== Teams ==
A total of 12 teams are contesting the league, including the best 10 sides from the previous season, plus two promoted clubs from the lower division B Group.

As finishing in the bottom four places of the table at the end of season 2013–14, Chernomorets Burgas, Neftochimic, Pirin (Gotse Delchev) and Lyubimets 2007 were relegated to B Group and only two teams were promoted from B Group with the objective of decreasing the number of teams from 14 to 12 for the current season. Chernomorets ended a seven year stint in the top tier, while the other three teams were relegated after a single season in the elite.

The relegated teams were replaced by Marek Dupnitsa, the 2013–14 B Group champions and Haskovo, the 2013–14 B Group runner-up. While Marek returns to the top division after six years, Haskovo reaches again the highest class after 21 years.

=== Stadia and locations ===
Note: Table lists in alphabetical order.

Location of teams in 2014–15 A Group
Sofia 2014–15 A Group football clubs

| Team | Location | Stadium | Capacity (seating) |
|---|---|---|---|
| Beroe Stara Zagora | Stara Zagora | Stadion Beroe | 12,128 |
| Botev Plovdiv | Plovdiv | Botev 1912 Football Complex | 4,000 |
| Cherno More Varna | Varna | Stadion Ticha | 8,250 |
| CSKA Sofia | Sofia | Stadion Balgarska Armia | 22,015 |
| Haskovo | Haskovo | Stadion Haskovo | 12,500 |
| Levski Sofia | Sofia | Stadion Georgi Asparuhov | 19,000 |
| Litex Lovech | Lovech | Stadion Lovech | 8,100 |
| Lokomotiv Plovdiv | Plovdiv | Stadion Lokomotiv | 10,000 |
| Lokomotiv Sofia | Sofia | Lokomotiv Stadium | 22,000 |
| Ludogorets | Razgrad | Ludogorets Arena | 6,500 |
| Marek Dupnitsa | Dupnitsa | Stadion Bonchuk | 16,050 |
| Slavia Sofia | Sofia | Stadion Slavia | 15,992 |

=== Personnel and sponsoring ===
Note: Flags indicate national team as has been defined under FIFA eligibility rules. Players and Managers may hold more than one non-FIFA nationality.

| Team | Manager | Captain | Kit manufacturer | Shirt sponsor |
|---|---|---|---|---|
| Beroe Stara Zagora | (Bulgaria) Petar Hubchev | (Bulgaria) Ivo Ivanov | Joma | BEROE |
| Botev Plovdiv | (Bulgaria) Petar Penchev | (Bulgaria) Ivan Tsvetkov | Uhlsport | Vivacom |
| Cherno More Varna | (Bulgaria) Nikola Spasov | (Bulgaria) Kiril Kotev | Tommy | Armeets |
| CSKA Sofia | (Bulgaria) Luboslav Penev | (Bulgaria) Valentin Iliev | Legea | Efbet |
| Haskovo | (Bulgaria) Stamen Belchev | (Bulgaria) Ivan Skerlev | Flair | — |
| Levski Sofia | (Bulgaria) Stoycho Stoev | (Bulgaria) Vladimir Gadzhev | Joma | Efbet |
| Litex Lovech | (Bulgaria) Krasimir Balakov | (Bulgaria) Strahil Popov | adidas | Prima, Efbet |
| Lokomotiv Plovdiv | (Bulgaria) Hristo Kolev | (Bulgaria) Stanislav Malamov | Joma | ProfiLink |
| Lokomotiv Sofia | (Bulgaria) Dimitar Vasev | (Bulgaria) Aleksandar Branekov | Joma | Casa Boyana, Efbet |
| Ludogorets Razgrad | (Bulgaria) Georgi Dermendzhiev | (Bulgaria) Svetoslav Dyakov | Macron | eCasino.bg |
| Marek Dupnitsa | (Bulgaria) Tencho Tenev | (Bulgaria) Milen Lahchev | Jumper | Actavis |
| Slavia Sofia | (Bulgaria) Ivan Kolev | (Bulgaria) Georgi Petkov | Joma | Asset Insurance, Efbet |

=== Managerial changes ===
| Team | Outgoing manager | Manner of departure | Date of vacancy | Position in table | Incoming manager | Date of appointment |
|---|---|---|---|---|---|---|
| Cherno More | (Bulgaria) Georgi Ivanov | Resignation | 18 May 2014 | Pre-season | (Bulgaria) Aleksandar Stankov | 2 June 2014 |
| Levski Sofia | (Bulgaria) Elin Topuzakov | | 18 May 2014 | Pre-season | (Spain) Pepe Murcia | 5 June 2014 |
| Marek Dupnitsa | (Bulgaria) Ivaylo Pargov | | 18 May 2014 | Pre-season | (Bulgaria) Anton Velkov | 5 June 2014 |
| Lokomotiv Plovdiv | (Bulgaria) Aleksandar Stankov | Mutual consent | 19 May 2014 | Pre-season | (Bulgaria) Emil Velev | 12 June 2014 |
| Litex Lovech | (Serbia) Miodrag Ješić | End of contract | 19 May 2014 | Pre-season | (Bulgaria) Krasimir Balakov | 27 May 2014 |
| Botev Plovdiv | (Bulgaria) Stanimir Stoilov | Mutual consent | 4 June 2014 | Pre-season | (Bulgaria) Lyuboslav Penev | 6 June 2014 |
| Botev Plovdiv | (Bulgaria) Lyuboslav Penev | Mutual consent | 7 July 2014 | Pre-season | (Bulgaria) Velislav Vutsov | 14 July 2014 |
| Lokomotiv Plovdiv | (Bulgaria) Emil Velev | Mutual consent | 8 July 2014 | Pre-season | (Bulgaria) Nedelcho Matushev | 9 July 2014 |
| Ludogorets Razgrad | (Bulgaria) Stoycho Stoev | Sacked | 31 July 2014 | 10th | (Bulgaria) Georgi Dermendzhiev | 1 August 2014 |
| Levski Sofia | (Spain) Pepe Murcia | Sacked | 4 August 2014 | 6th | (Bulgaria) Georgi Ivanov | 4 August 2014 |
| Cherno More | (Bulgaria) Aleksandar Stankov | Sacked | 18 August 2014 | 12th | (Bulgaria) Nikola Spasov | 18 August 2014 |
| Slavia Sofia | (Bulgaria) Milen Radukanov | Resigned | 31 August 2014 | 11th | (Bulgaria) Ivan Kolev | 1 September 2014 |
| Haskovo | (Bulgaria) Dimcho Nenov | Resigned | 20 September 2014 | 12th | (Bulgaria) Emil Velev | 6 October 2014 |
| Lokomotiv Plovdiv | (Bulgaria) Nedelcho Matushev | Resigned | 29 September 2014 | 11th | (Bulgaria) Hristo Kolev | 1 October 2014 |
| Marek Dupnitsa | (Bulgaria) Anton Velkov | Resigned | 5 October 2014 | 9th | (Bulgaria) Tencho Tenev | 10 October 2014 |
| Botev Plovdiv | (Bulgaria) Velislav Vutsov | Sacked | 3 December 2014 | 7th | (Bulgaria) Petar Penchev | 4 December 2014 |
| Levski Sofia | (Bulgaria) Georgi Ivanov | Resigned | 6 December 2014 | 6th | (Bulgaria) Stoycho Stoev | 22 December 2014 |
| Haskovo | (Bulgaria) Emil Velev | Resigned | 18 March 2015 | 12th | (Bulgaria) Stamen Belchev | 27 March 2015 |
| CSKA Sofia | (Bulgaria) Stoycho Mladenov | Resigned | 20 March 2015 | 2nd | (Bulgaria) Galin Ivanov | 24 March 2015 |
| CSKA Sofia | (Bulgaria) Galin Ivanov | Early end of caretaker spell (majority shareholders' decision) | 27 April 2015 | 4th | (Bulgaria) Luboslav Penev | 28 April 2015 |

== First phase ==
The first 22 Rounds comprise the first phase of the season, also called the Regular season. In the first phase, every team plays each other team twice on a home-away basis till all the teams have played two matches against each other. The table standings at the end of the Regular season determine the group in which each team is going to play in the Play-offs.

=== League table ===
| Pos | Team | Pld | W | D | L | GF | GA | GD | Pts | Qualification |
|---|---|---|---|---|---|---|---|---|---|---|
| 1 | Ludogorets Razgrad | 22 | 14 | 5 | 3 | 46 | 14 | +32 | 47 | Qualification for championship group |
| 2 | CSKA Sofia | 22 | 13 | 5 | 4 | 39 | 15 | +24 | 44 | Qualification for championship group |
| 3 | Lokomotiv Sofia | 22 | 12 | 3 | 7 | 29 | 24 | +5 | 39 (Note: Lokomotiv Sofia ahead of Litex Lovech on head-to-head away goals scored; Lokomotiv Sofia–Litex Lovech 2–0, Litex Lovech–Lokomotiv Sofia 4–2.) | Qualification for championship group |
| 4 | Litex Lovech | 22 | 12 | 3 | 7 | 37 | 24 | +13 | 39 | Qualification for championship group |
| 5 | Beroe Stara Zagora | 22 | 11 | 5 | 6 | 34 | 21 | +13 | 38 | Qualification for championship group |
| 6 | Botev Plovdiv | 22 | 11 | 3 | 8 | 32 | 26 | +6 | 36 | Qualification for championship group |
| 7 | Levski Sofia | 22 | 10 | 4 | 8 | 36 | 25 | +11 | 34 | Qualification for relegation group |
| 8 | Cherno More Varna | 22 | 9 | 4 | 9 | 26 | 24 | +2 | 31 | Qualification for relegation group |
| 9 | Slavia Sofia | 22 | 6 | 5 | 11 | 24 | 30 | −6 | 23 | Qualification for relegation group |
| 10 | Lokomotiv Plovdiv | 22 | 5 | 5 | 12 | 13 | 36 | −23 | 20 | Qualification for relegation group |
| 11 | Marek Dupnitsa | 22 | 3 | 5 | 14 | 8 | 45 | −37 | 14 | Qualification for relegation group |
| 12 | Haskovo | 22 | 2 | 1 | 19 | 12 | 52 | −40 | 7 | Qualification for relegation group |

Source: bulgarian-football.com
Rules for classification: 1st points; 2nd head-to-head points; 3rd head-to-head goal difference; 4th head-to-head goals scored; 5th head-to-head away goals scored; 6th season goal difference; 7th season goals scored; 8th "sportsmanship" (R & Y cards); 9th draw

=== Results ===
Each team played against every other team for a total of 22 matches.

| Home \ Away | BSZ | BOT | CHM | CSK | HAS | LEV | LIT | LPL | LSO | LUD | MAR | SLA |
|---|---|---|---|---|---|---|---|---|---|---|---|---|
| Beroe | | 1–1 | 1–1 | 1–2 | 3–0 | 2–1 | 2–0 | 3–0 | 0–0 | 0–4 | 4–0 | 1–1 |
| Botev Plovdiv | 3–1 | | 2–1 | 2–0 | 2–0 | 0–3 | 3–3 | 2–0 | 1–0 | 1–2 | 3–0 | 2–0 |
| Cherno More | 4–0 | 2–1 | | 1–1 | 1–0 | 1–0 | 0–3 | 3–0 | 0–1 | 0–0 | 0–1 | 2–0 |
| CSKA Sofia | 0–1 | 1–0 | 3–1 | | 4–0 | 2–0 | 2–0 | 2–0 | 3–0 | 1–1 | 5–0 | 0–0 |
| Haskovo | 1–0 | 1–2 | 0–1 | 2–4 | | 1–4 | 1–4 | 1–2 | 0–0 | 1–0 | 0–1 | 1–5 |
| Levski Sofia | 0–1 | 2–1 | 1–0 | 0–3 | 8–0 | | 2–2 | 1–1 | 1–0 | 3–2 | 4–0 | 2–0 |
| Litex Lovech | 2–1 | 1–2 | 3–0 | 0–1 | 2–0 | 3–0 | | 1–0 | 4–2 | 1–0 | 3–0 | 2–0 |
| Lokomotiv Plovdiv | 0–3 | 0–2 | 1–1 | 0–3 | 1–0 | 1–1 | 2–0 | | 0–4 | 1–4 | 1–0 | 1–1 |
| Lokomotiv Sofia | 0–3 | 3–1 | 2–1 | 2–0 | 2–1 | 0–1 | 2–0 | 2–0 | | 2–2 | 2–0 | 1–0 |
| Ludogorets Razgrad | 1–1 | 1–0 | 2–0 | 2–0 | 3–1 | 1–0 | 4–1 | 2–0 | 5–1 | | 3–0 | 0–0 |
| Marek | 0–3 | 1–1 | 1–3 | 0–0 | 2–1 | 1–1 | 0–0 | 0–0 | 0–1 | 0–4 | | 0–2 |
| Slavia Sofia | 0–2 | 3–0 | 1–3 | 2–2 | 1–0 | 3–1 | 0–2 | 0–2 | 1–2 | 0–3 | 4–1 | |

Source: bulgarian-football.com
Legend: Blue = home team win; Yellow = draw; Red = away team win.

=== Round by round ===
| Round | 1 | 2 | 3 | 4 | 5 | 6 | 7 | 8 | 9 | 10 | 11 | 12 | 13 | 14 | 15 | 16 | 17 | 18 | 19 | 20 | 21 | 22 |
|---|---|---|---|---|---|---|---|---|---|---|---|---|---|---|---|---|---|---|---|---|---|---|
| Beroe | D | D | L | W | W | W | D | W | W | L | W | L | L | W | W | D | L | L | W | W | W | D |
| Botev Plovdiv | W | D | W | D | L | W | W | L | D | W | L | L | W | L | W | L | L | W | L | W | W | W |
| Cherno More | D | D | L | L | L | W | L | D | W | L | W | W | L | W | W | L | D | W | L | W | L | W |
| CSKA Sofia | W | W | D | W | L | W | W | D | W | W | W | W | W | D | W | D | D | W | W | L | L | L |
| Haskovo | W | L | L | L | D | L | L | L | L | L | L | L | L | L | L | L | W | L | L | L | L | L |
| Levski Sofia | D | L | W | L | W | L | W | W | W | W | D | D | L | W | L | W | D | L | L | W | L | W |
| Litex Lovech | L | L | W | D | W | W | W | W | L | W | L | L | W | L | L | W | D | W | W | W | D | W |
| Lokomotiv Plovdiv | D | D | W | L | D | L | L | L | L | L | W | D | W | W | L | W | D | L | L | L | L | L |
| Lokomotiv Sofia | L | W | L | W | D | D | W | W | L | W | L | W | L | L | W | W | L | W | W | W | W | D |
| Ludogorets | L | D | W | W | W | D | D | W | W | L | D | W | W | W | W | D | W | W | W | L | W | W |
| Marek Dupnitsa | L | W | L | W | D | L | L | L | D | L | D | L | W | L | L | L | D | L | L | L | D | L |
| Slavia Sofia | W | D | D | L | L | L | L | L | L | W | D | W | L | D | L | D | W | L | W | L | W | L |

Source: sportal.bg
W = Win; D = Draw; L = Loss

== Second phase ==
After the first 22 Rounds comprising the Regular season, the teams are divided into two groups of six determined by their standings in the table at the end of the Regular season. The second phase is also referred to as the Play-offs. The teams in each group of the Play-offs again play on a home-away basis but only with the teams in their respective group. Hence, the total number of games each team has to play in this phase is 10 (twice with each of the other five teams in the group).

=== Championship group ===
The top six teams at the end of the Regular season play in the Championship group to determine the champion for the season. Additionally, the teams in this group compete for the Bulgarian spots in UEFA's 2015–16 editions of Champions League and Europa League.

At the end of the Play-offs, the team placed first in the group can compete in the qualifying rounds of 2015–16 UEFA Champions League. The second and the third placed teams earn the right to compete in the qualifying rounds of 2015–16 UEFA Europa League. If the winner of the 2014–15 Bulgarian Cup is one of those top three teams, the fourth placed team in the group also earns a right to participate in the qualifying rounds of the Europa League.

| Pos | Team | Pld | W | D | L | GF | GA | GD | Pts | Qualification or relegation |
|---|---|---|---|---|---|---|---|---|---|---|
| 1 | Ludogorets Razgrad (C) | 32 | 18 | 9 | 5 | 63 | 24 | +39 | 63 | Qualification for Champions League second qualifying round |
| 2 | Beroe | 32 | 15 | 10 | 7 | 46 | 30 | +16 | 55 (Note: Beroe ahead of Lokomotiv Sofia on head-to-head points; Beroe: 7 pts, Lokomotiv Sofia: 4 pts.) | Qualification for Europa League first qualifying round |
| 3 | Lokomotiv Sofia (R) | 32 | 16 | 7 | 9 | 39 | 31 | +8 | 55 | Relegation to 2015–16 V Group (Note: Lokomotiv Sofia did not receive a license for European competitions and Litex Lovech took their place.) |
| 4 | Litex Lovech | 32 | 16 | 6 | 10 | 49 | 36 | +13 | 54 | Qualification for Europa League first qualifying round |
| 5 | CSKA Sofia (D, R) | 32 | 14 | 10 | 8 | 45 | 27 | +18 | 52 | Relegation to 2015–16 V Group |
| 6 | Botev Plovdiv | 32 | 12 | 6 | 14 | 38 | 39 | −1 | 42 | |

Source: bulgarian-football.com
Rules for classification: 1st points; 2nd head-to-head points; 3rd head-to-head goal difference; 4th head-to-head goals scored; 5th head-to-head away goals scored; 6th season goal difference; 7th season goals scored; 8th "sportsmanship" (R & Y cards); 9th draw
(C) Champions; (D) Disqualified; (R) Relegated
Notes:

Results
| Home \ Away | BSZ | BOT | CSK | LIT | LSO | LUD |
|---|---|---|---|---|---|---|
| Beroe | | 2–1 | 0–0 | 3–1 | 1–4 | 2–0 |
| Botev Plovdiv | 1–1 | | 3–2 | 0–1 | 0–2 | 1–3 |
| CSKA Sofia | 0–0 | 0–0 | | 3–1 | 0–1 | 0–0 |
| Litex Lovech | 1–1 | 1–0 | 2–0 | | 0–0 | 4–2 |
| Lokomotiv Sofia | 0–1 | 1–0 | 1–1 | 0–0 | | 0–0 |
| Ludogorets Razgrad | 1–1 | 0–0 | 4–0 | 3–1 | 4–1 | |

Source: A PFG
Legend: Blue = home team win; Yellow = draw; Red = away team win.

=== Relegation group ===
The bottom six teams at the end of the Regular season play in the Relegation group to determine which two teams are relegated to B PFG for next season.

At the end of the Play-offs the bottom two teams of this group will be directly relegated.

| Pos | Team | Pld | W | D | L | GF | GA | GD | Pts | Qualification or relegation |
|---|---|---|---|---|---|---|---|---|---|---|
| 7 | Levski Sofia | 32 | 17 | 5 | 10 | 66 | 33 | +33 | 56 | |
| 8 | Cherno More | 32 | 15 | 5 | 12 | 42 | 36 | +6 | 50 | Qualification for Europa League second qualifying round (Note: Cherno More Varna qualified for the 2015–16 UEFA Europa League second qualifying round by winning the 2014–15 Bulgarian Cup.) |
| 9 | Slavia Sofia | 32 | 12 | 7 | 13 | 40 | 38 | +2 | 43 | |
| 10 | Lokomotiv Plovdiv | 32 | 9 | 5 | 18 | 28 | 52 | −24 | 32 | |
| 11 | Marek (R) | 32 | 5 | 5 | 22 | 14 | 71 | −57 | 20 | Relegation to 2015-16 V Group |
| 12 | Haskovo (R) | 32 | 4 | 3 | 25 | 18 | 71 | −53 | 15 | Relegation to 2015-16 V Group |

Source: bulgarian-football.com, UEFA.com (in English)
Rules for classification: 1st points; 2nd head-to-head points; 3rd head-to-head goal difference; 4th head-to-head goals scored; 5th head-to-head away goals scored; 6th season goal difference; 7th season goals scored; 8th "sportsmanship" (R & Y cards); 9th draw
(R) Relegated
Notes:

Results
| Home \ Away | CHM | HAS | LEV | LPL | MAR | SLA |
|---|---|---|---|---|---|---|
| Cherno More | | 2–0 | 0–2 | 1–2 | 1–0 | 1–1 |
| Haskovo | 1–3 | | 0–5 | 2–0 | 1–0 | 0–1 |
| Levski Sofia | 5–2 | 1–1 | | 5–0 | 6–0 | 2–3 |
| Lokomotiv Plovdiv | 0–1 | 4–0 | 0–1 | | 4–0 | 1–2 |
| Marek | 0–2 | 3–1 | 1–3 | 1–4 | | 1–0 |
| Slavia Sofia | 1–3 | 0–0 | 1–0 | 3–0 | 4–0 | |

Source: A PFG
Legend: Blue = home team win; Yellow = draw; Red = away team win.

== Season statistics ==
=== Top scorers ===
| Rank | Scorer | Club | Goals |
|---|---|---|---|
| 1 | (Spain) Añete | Levski Sofia | 14 |
| 2 | (Bulgaria) Martin Kamburov | Lokomotiv Plovdiv | 13 |
| 3 | (Colombia) Danilo Asprilla | Litex Lovech | 10 |
| 3 | (Romania) Sergiu Buș | CSKA Sofia | 10 |
| 3 | (Bulgaria) Radoslav Vasilev | Slavia Sofia | 10 |
| 3 | (Bulgaria) Valeri Domovchiyski | Levski Sofia | 10 |
| 3 | (Brazil) Juninho Quixadá | Ludogorets Razgrad | 10 |
| 3 | (Netherlands) Virgil Misidjan | Ludogorets Razgrad | 10 |
| 9 | (Colombia) Wilmar Jordán | Litex Lovech | 9 |
| 9 | (Tunisia) Lamjed Chehoudi | Lokomotiv Sofia | 9 |

Updated on 26 May 2015

==== Hat-tricks ====
| Player | For | Against | Result | Date |
|---|---|---|---|---|
| (Bulgaria) Ventsislav Hristov | Beroe Stara Zagora | Marek Dupnitsa | 4–0 | 13 September 2014 |
| (France) Jérémy Manzorro | Slavia Sofia | Levski Sofia | 3–1 | 13 December 2014 |
| (Spain) Añete | Levski Sofia | Lokomotiv Plovdiv | 5–0 | 17 April 2015 |
| (Bulgaria) Martin Kamburov | Lokomotiv Plovdiv | Marek Dupnitsa | 4–1 | 17 May 2015 |
| (United States) Bjørn Johnsen | Litex Lovech | Ludogorets Razgrad | 4–2 | 23 May 2015 |
| (Bulgaria) Bozhidar Kraev | Levski Sofia | Marek Dupnitsa | 6–0 | 26 May 2015 |

Updated on 26 May 2015

== Awards ==
=== Weekly awards ===
==== Player of the Round ====
| Round | Player of the Round | |
| Round | Player | Club |
|---|---|---|
| Round 1 | (Bulgaria) Doncho Atanasov | FC Haskovo |
| Round 2 | (Bulgaria) Anton Karachanakov | CSKA Sofia |
| Round 3 | (Brazil) Michel Platini | Slavia Sofia |
| Round 4 | (Democratic Republic of the Congo) Junior Mapuku | Beroe Stara Zagora |
| Round 5 | (Bulgaria) Vladimir Gadzhev | Levski Sofia |
| Round 6 | | |
| Round 7 | (Romania) Sergiu Buș | CSKA Sofia |
| Round 8 | (Bulgaria) Ventsislav Hristov | Beroe Stara Zagora |
| Round 9 | | |
| Round 10 | (Spain) Miguel Bedoya | Levski Sofia |
| Round 11 | (Portugal) Toni Silva | CSKA Sofia |
| Round 12 | (Bulgaria) Martin Kamburov | Lokomotiv Plovdiv |
| Round 13 | (Romania) Sergiu Buș | CSKA Sofia |
| Round 14 | (Brazil) Elias | Beroe Stara Zagora |
| Round 15 | (Bulgaria) Anton Karachanakov | CSKA Sofia |
| Round 16 | (Bulgaria) Anton Karachanakov | CSKA Sofia |
| Round 17 | (Bulgaria) Radoslav Vasilev | Slavia Sofia |
| Round 18 | | |
| Round 19 | | |
| Round 20 | | |
| Round 21 | | |
| Round 22 | | |
| Round 23 | | |
| Round 24 | | |
| Round 25 | | |
| Round 26 | | |
| Round 27 | | |
| Round 28 | | |
| Round 29 | | |
| Round 30 | | |
| Round 31 | | |
| Round 32 | | |

=== Monthly awards ===
==== Player of the Month ====
| Month | Player of the Month | |
| Month | Player | Club |
|---|---|---|
| July | (Bulgaria) Anton Karachanakov | CSKA Sofia |
| August | | |
| September | (Romania) Sergiu Buș | CSKA Sofia |
| October | (Romania) Sergiu Buș | CSKA Sofia |
| November | | |
| December | | |
| January | | |
| February | | |
| March | | |
| April | (Spain) Añete | Levski Sofia |
| May | | |

== Transfers ==
- List of Bulgarian football transfers summer 2014
- List of Bulgarian football transfers winter 2014–15

== Attendances ==
| # | Club | Average | Highest |
|---|---|---|---|
| 1 | Beroe | 4,069 | 8,700 |
| 2 | CSKA Sofia | 3,881 | 13,900 |
| 3 | Ludogorets | 3,422 | 6,500 |
| 4 | Botev | 2,169 | 3,500 |
| 5 | Lokomotiv Plovdiv | 1,988 | 5,600 |
| 6 | Haskovo | 1,819 | 6,000 |
| 7 | Cherno More | 1,711 | 4,700 |
| 8 | Levski | 1,628 | 8,900 |
| 9 | Lovech | 1,264 | 4,200 |
| 10 | Marek | 1,049 | 2,600 |
| 11 | Lokomotiv Sofia | 914 | 5,800 |
| 12 | Slavia Sofia | 496 | 3,600 |
