= Michael Tawiah =

Ghanaian professional footballer (born 1990)

Personal information
- Full name: Michael Tawiah
- Date of birth: 1 December 1990 (age 35)
- Place of birth: Accra, Ghana
- Height: 1.70 m (5 ft 7 in)
- Position: Midfielder

Youth career
- Ambah FC
- 2008–2009: Tema

Senior career*
Years	Team	Apps	(Gls)
2009	Lokomotiv Mezdra	10	(1)
2010–2011	Levski Sofia	3	(0)
2011	→ Kaliakra Kavarna (loan)	9	(2)
2011	Chernomorets Burgas	0	(0)
2012–2014	Lyubimets 2007	54	(5)
2014	Haskovo	7	(0)
2015	Borac Čačak	2	(0)
2016	Lokomotiv Mezdra	9	(0)
2016	Pomorie	12	(1)
2017	Vonds Ichihara	14	(4)
2018–2019	Vereya	8	(0)

International career
2009	Ghana U20	1	(0)
- * Club domestic league appearances and goals as of 16 December 2018

Michael Tawiah (born 1 December 1990) is a Ghanaian professional footballer who plays as a midfielder.

== Career ==
Born in Accra, Tawiah starter playing at the age of 12 at Ambah FC and then he played with Tema. Then he continued his career in Bulgaria with Lokomotiv Mezdra, Levski Sofia and Kaliakra Kavarna.

In July 2011, Tawiah joined Chernomorets Burgas after his contract with Levski Sofia was mutually terminated. In September 2011, he was released due to health problems. After that Tawiah played in Bulgarian clubs PFC Lyubimets and PFC Haskovo.

On 29 January 2015, Tawiah signed with Serbian Superliga club Borac Čačak.

On 30 January 2017, Tawiah was released by Pomorie. In March 2017, he joined Japanese club Vonds Ichihara.

On 25 July 2023 he was arrested for drug distribution in Sunny Beach.
