= Strahil Popov =

Bulgarian footballer

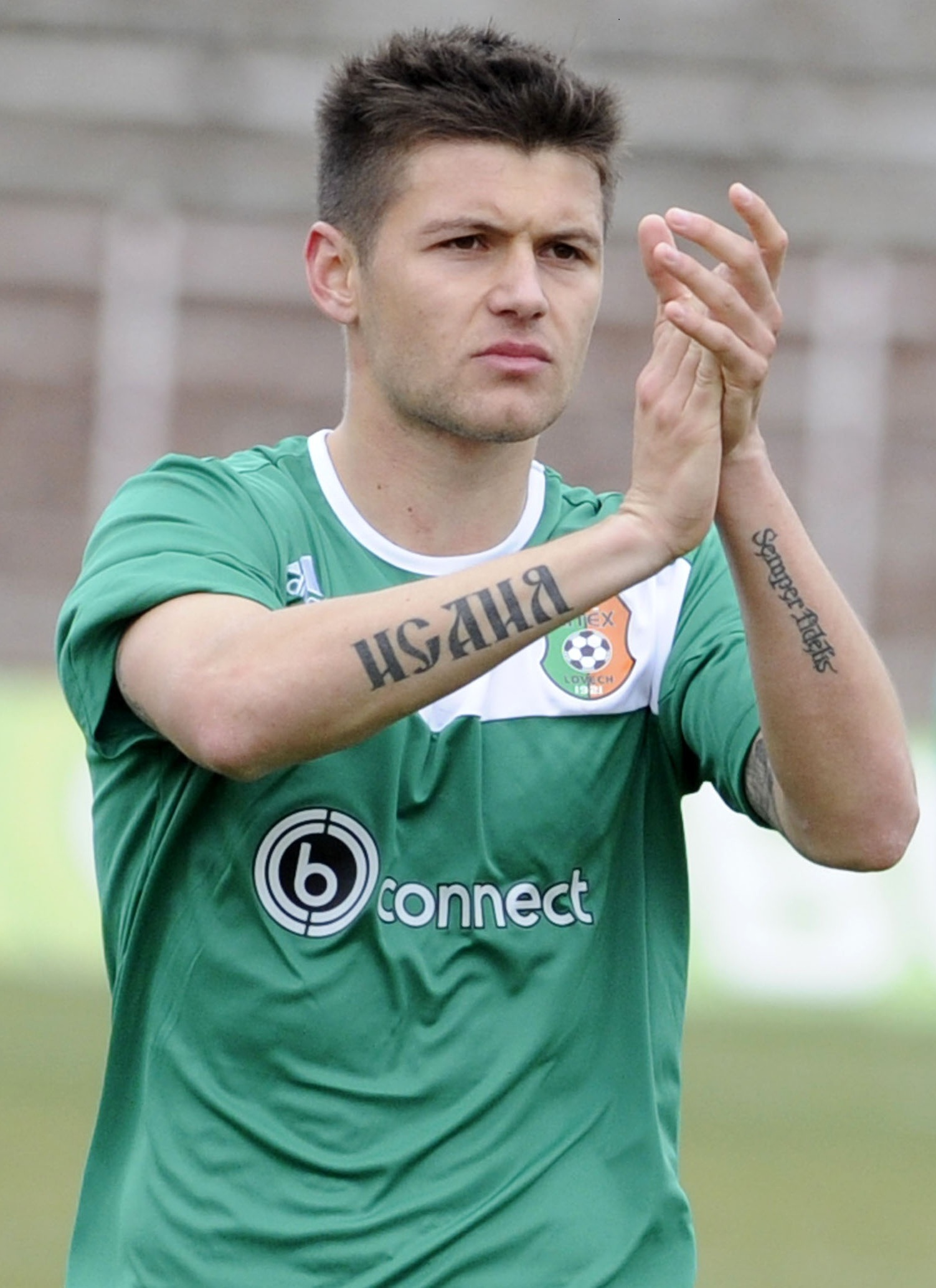

Personal information
- Full name: Strahil Venkov Popov
- Date of birth: 31 August 1990 (age 36)
- Place of birth: Blagoevgrad, Bulgaria
- Height: 1.85 m (6 ft 1 in)
- Position: Right-back

Youth career
- Pirin Blagoevgrad
- Pirin 2001

Senior career*
Years	Team	Apps	(Gls)
2008–2015	Litex Lovech	138	(6)
2009	→ Lokomotiv Mezdra (loan)	14	(0)
2010	→ Montana (loan)	2	(0)
2016–2020	Kasımpaşa	125	(1)
2020–2021	Hatayspor	57	(0)
2022	Eyüpspor	16	(0)
2022–2024	Ümraniyespor	46	(2)
Total		398	(9)

International career
2008	Bulgaria U19	3	(0)
2009–2012	Bulgaria U21	3	(0)
2014–2021	Bulgaria	35	(0)
- * Club domestic league appearances and goals

Strahil Popov (Bulgarian: Страхил Попов; born 31 August 1990) is a Bulgarian former professional footballer who played as a right-back.

Popov began his professional career at Litex Lovech in 2008. After loan spells at Lokomotiv Mezdra and Montana he became a regular in their team, playing 159 total games and scoring 6 goals for Litex. He signed for Kasımpaşa in January 2016.

Popov earned 35 caps for Bulgaria between 2014 and 2021.

== Club career ==
Born in Blagoevgrad, Popov began his career playing for Pirin Blagoevgrad before departing for Pirin 2001.

=== Litex Lovech ===
In 2008, Popov joined Litex Lovech.

==== Lokomotiv Mezdra (loan) ====
On 9 July 2009, Popov joined Lokomotiv Mezdra on loan until December 2009. He made his team début on 10 July, scoring goal in a 2–1 friendly loss against Sivasspor.

==== Montana (loan) ====
On 18 January 2010, Popov was loaned out to Montana for the rest of the season. He made his competitive debut on 20 March in a 0–0 home league draw against Litex, coming on as a second-half substitute, and participated in only one more game to the end of the season.

=== Return to Litex ===
Popov returned to Litex at the end of the 2009–10 season. He played only three league games during a following campaign and became a regular first team player in the 2011–12 season. On 21 March 2012, Popov was sent off for the first time in his professional career in a 1–1 away draw against Beroe Stara Zagora.

On 21 July 2013, Popov scored his first goal for Litex, with a header, netting the third in a 4–1 home win over Neftochimic Burgas. He then scored the winning goal in Litex's 2–1 away win against Slavia Sofia on 7 December.

On 3 August 2014, Popov was announced as Litex's new club captain. Six days later, he added his third goal for Litex against Botev Plovdiv in a 3–3 away draw.

=== Kasımpaşa ===
On 5 January 2016, he moved to the Turkish Süper Lig team Kasımpaşa for a reported fee of €750,000. He was given the number 90 jersey.

On 27 October 2017, he scored his first league goal in a match against Göztepe.

== International career ==
After first being called up for a friendly match against Belarus in March 2014, but remaining an unused substitute, Popov made his debut for the national side on 23 May 2014, in the 1–1 draw with Canada. He played as a starter on 10 October 2015, in the 0–3 loss against Croatia in a Euro 2016 qualifier, remaining on the pitch for the full 90 minutes.

On 13 October 2018, he provided two decisive assists in a 2–1 home win against Cyprus, in a match for the 2018–19 UEFA Nations League. He became second top assistant with four assists in all over group in the competition.

== Career statistics ==
=== Club ===
As of 25 December 2019

Appearances and goals by club, season and competition
Club	Season	League			National cup (Note: Includes Bulgarian Cup, Turkish Cup.)		Europe		Other		Total	
Club	Season	Division	Apps	Goals	Apps	Goals	Apps	Goals	Apps	Goals	Apps	Goals
Litex Lovech	2008–09	A Group	3	0	0	0	0	0	–		3	0
Litex Lovech	2010–11	A Group	3	0	0	0	0	0	–		3	0
Litex Lovech	2011–12	A Group	18	0	2	0	0	0	1 (Note: Appearance in Bulgarian Supercup)	0	21	0
Litex Lovech	2012–13	A Group	27	0	3	0	–		–		30	0
Litex Lovech	2013–14	A Group	37	2	3	0	–		–		40	2
Litex Lovech	2014–15	A Group	31	3	4	0	4	0	–		39	3
Litex Lovech	2015–16	A Group	19	1	2	0	2	0	–		23	1
Litex Lovech	Total		138	6	14	0	6	0	1	0	159	6
Lokomotiv Mezdra (loan)	2009–10	A Group	14	0	0	0	–		–		14	0
Montana (loan)	2009–10	A Group	2	0	0	0	–		–		2	0
Kasımpaşa	2015–16	Süper Lig	13	0	0	0	–		–		13	0
Kasımpaşa	2016–17	Süper Lig	33	0	7	1	–		–		40	1
Kasımpaşa	2017–18	Süper Lig	32	1	0	0	–		–		32	1
Kasımpaşa	2018–19	Süper Lig	33	0	3	0	–		–		36	0
Kasımpaşa	2019–20	Süper Lig	14	0	0	0	–		–		14	0
Kasımpaşa	Total		125	1	10	1	0	0	0	0	135	2
Career total			280	7	25	1	6	0	1	0	312	8

=== International ===
As of 22 November 2018

Team	Year	Tournament		Friendly		Total	
Team	Year	Apps	Goals	Apps	Goals	Apps	Goals
Bulgaria
Bulgaria	2014	0	0	1	0	1	0
Bulgaria	2015	1	0	0	0	1	0
Bulgaria	2016	4	0	4	0	8	0
Bulgaria	2017	6	0	0	0	6	0
Bulgaria	2018	4	0	2	0	6	0
Total		15	0	7	0	22	0
Career total		21	0	8	0	29	0
