= OFC Lokomotiv Mezdra =

Bulgarian football club

Lokomotiv 2012 Mezdra
- Full name: Football Club Lokomotiv 2012 Mezdra
- Nickname: The irons from Mezdra
- Founded: 2012; 14 years ago
- Dissolved: 2016; 10 years ago
- Ground: Lokomotiv Stadium, Mezdra
- Capacity: 5 000
- 2015–16: B Group, 16th
Home colours	Away colours

Lokomotiv 2012 Mezdra (Bulgarian: Локомотив 2012 Мездра) was a Bulgarian football club from the city of Mezdra.

== History ==
=== Foundation ===
The team was founded in 2012 after dissolving of the original club PFC Lokomotiv Mezdra.

== Honours ==
- V Group:
  - Winners (1): 2013–14
- Cup of Bulgarian Amateur Football League:
  - Winners (1): 2013

== Last squad ==
As of 16 February 2016 Note: Flags indicate national team as defined under FIFA eligibility rules; some limited exceptions apply. Players may hold more than one non-FIFA nationality.

No.	Pos.	Nation	Player
1	GK	BUL	Yordan Krastev
2	DF	BUL	Martin Mitov (on loan from Litex II)
3	DF	BUL	Emil Petrov (on loan from Litex II)
5	MF	BUL	Nikola Yanachkov
6	DF	BUL	Georgi Georgiev
8	DF	BUL	Evgeni Tuntev
9	FW	BUL	Vladislav Zlatinov (captain)
10	FW	BUL	Georgi Mirchev
11	MF	BUL	Antonio Hadzhiivanov
13	DF	BUL	Galin Minkov (on loan from Litex II)
14	MF	BUL	Zlatko Bonev
15	MF	BUL	Petar Zlatinov

No.	Pos.	Nation	Player
16	MF	BUL	Nikolay Ganchev
17	FW	BUL	Georgi Kaloyanov
18	DF	BUL	Stoyan Georgiev
19	MF	BUL	Manol Chapov
20	FW	CGO	Arsène Luboya
21	MF	BUL	Ivaylo Boyadzhiev
22	DF	BUL	Emil Kolev
23	DF	BUL	Lyubomir Hristov
33	GK	BUL	Ivaylo Krusharski
44	MF	BUL	Denis Tsolev
88	MF	GHA	Michael Tawiah
92	MF	MLI	Abdoulaye Coulibaly

For recent transfers, see Transfers summer 2015 and Transfers winter 2015–16.

== Past seasons ==
Season	League	Place	W	D	L	GF	GA	Pts	Bulgarian Cup
2012–13	A RFG (IV)	3	18	3	6	84	44	57	not qualified
2013–14	V Group (III)	1	23	5	2	91	24	74	not qualified
2014–15	B Group (II)	9	12	5	13	43	41	41	First round
2015–16	B Group	16	5	5	20	20	28	20	First round
Green marks a season followed by promotion, red a season followed by relegation.

== Managers ==
Dates	Name	Honours
2012–2015	(Bulgaria) Ivan Redovski	1 V Group title 1 Amateur Cup title
2015	(Bulgaria) Predrag Pažin	
2015	(Bulgaria) Rumil Zhotev (interim)	
2016	(Bulgaria) Anatoli Tonov	
