= Stoyan Georgiev =

Bulgarian footballer

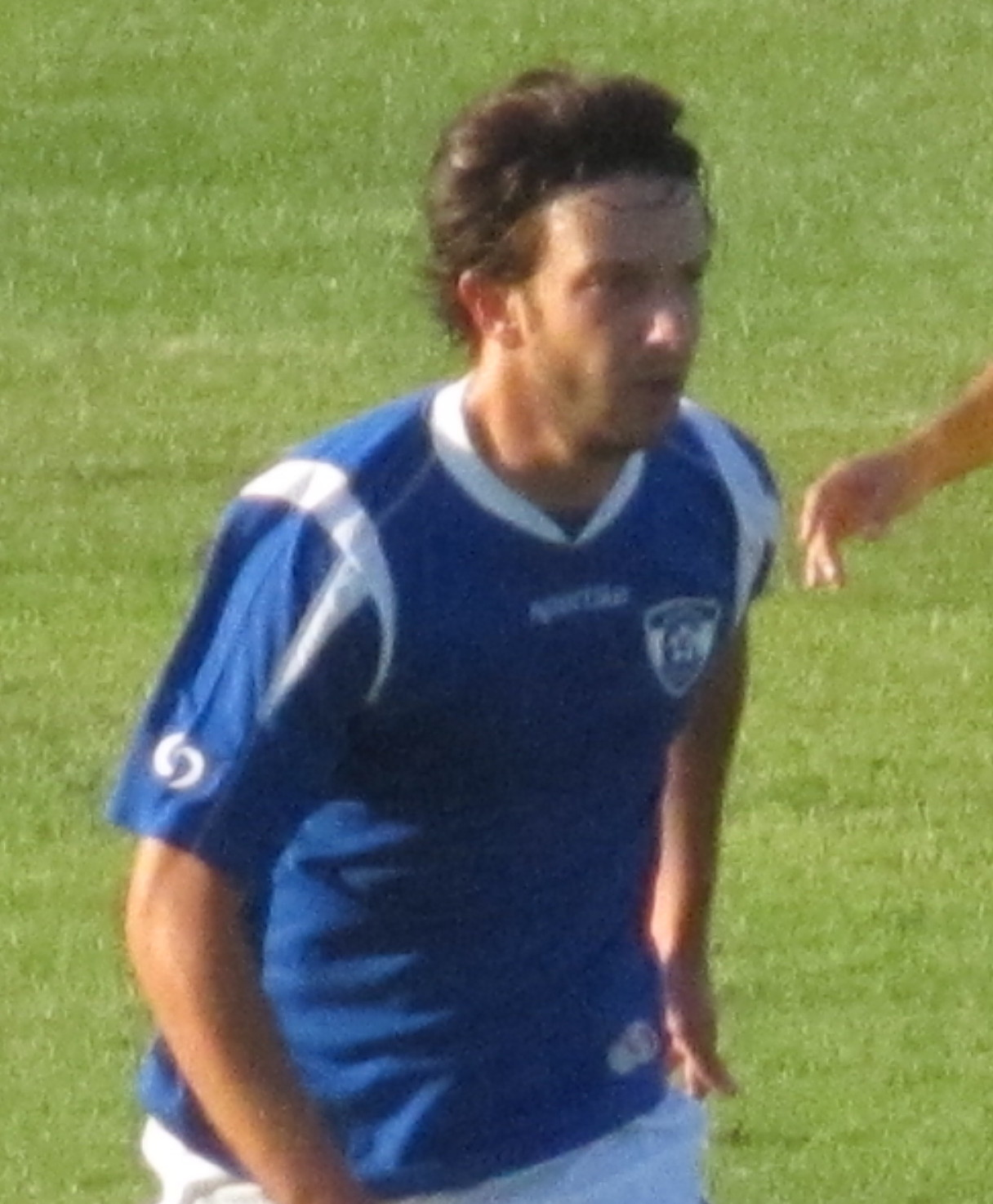

Personal information
- Full name: Stoyan Ivanov Georgiev
- Date of birth: 18 September 1986 (age 40)
- Place of birth: Sofia, Bulgaria
- Height: 1.86 m (6 ft 1 in)
- Position: Defender

Team information
- Current team: Balkan Botevgrad

Youth career
- Slavia Sofia

Senior career*
Years	Team	Apps	(Gls)
2004–2009	Slavia Sofia	10	(0)
2007–2009	→ Spartak Varna (loan)	51	(2)
2010	Spartak Varna	2	(0)
2010	Dunav Ruse	14	(0)
2011	Sliven 2000	27	(1)
2012	Spartak Varna	19	(2)
2013–2014	Dunav Ruse	37	(3)
2014–2016	Lokomotiv 2012 Mezdra	33	(0)
2016	Oborishte	11	(0)
2017–	Balkan Botevgrad	0	(0)
- * Club domestic league appearances and goals as of 3 February 2017

Stoyan Georgiev (Bulgarian: Стоян Георгиев; born 18 September 1986, in Sofia) is a Bulgarian footballer who plays as a defender for Balkan Botevgrad.

== Career ==
Georgiev was born in Sofia and started to play football in the local team Slavia. In 2005, he signed his first professional contract with the club, but over the course of two years played in only 7 matches. In January 2008 he was loaned to Spartak Varna for six months. In June of the same year Georgiev was loaned in Varna again for one season.

In February 2017, Georgiev joined Balkan Botevgrad.
