= Ivan Redovski =

Bulgarian footballer

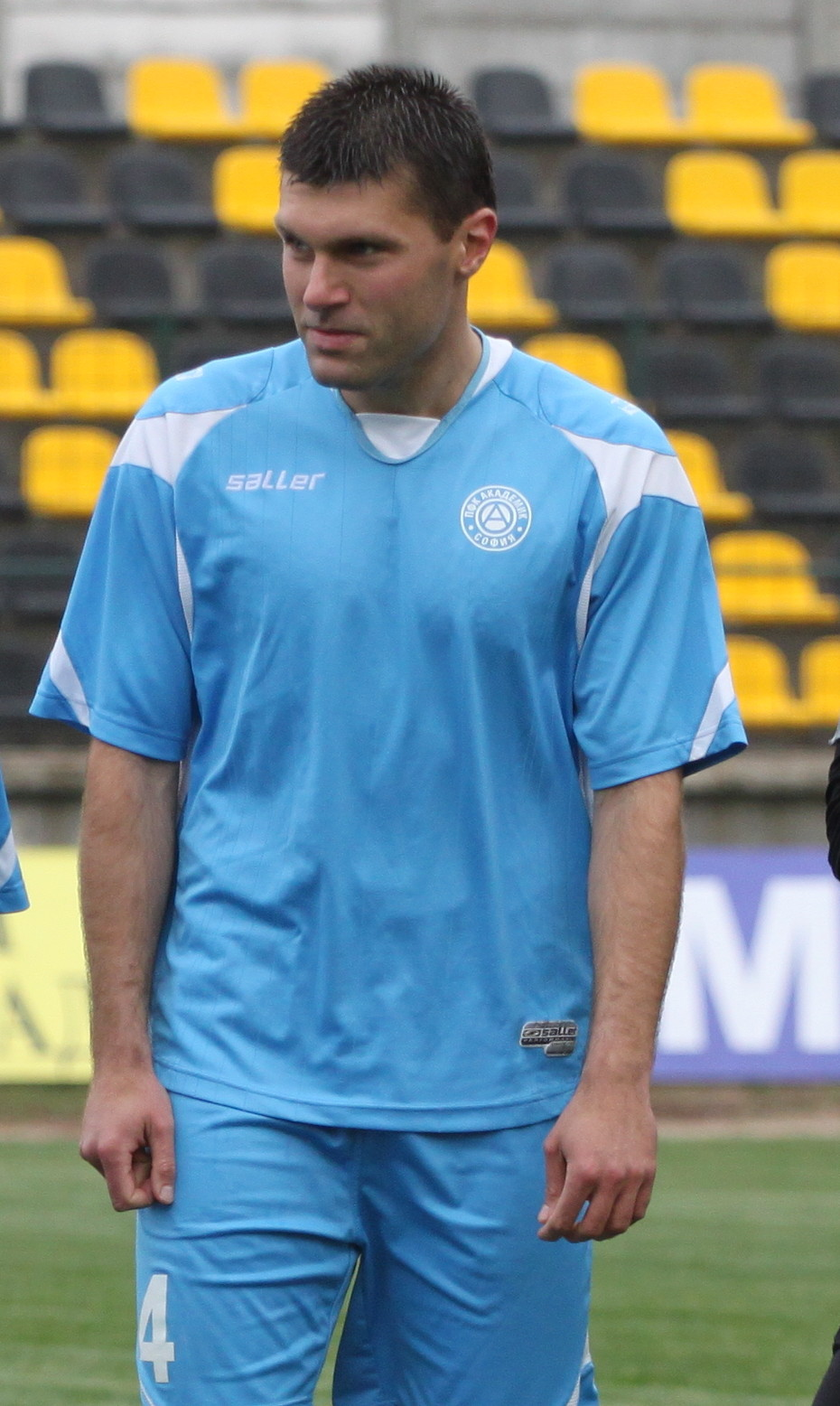

Personal information
- Full name: Ivan Vasilev Redovski
- Date of birth: 10 September 1981 (age 45)
- Place of birth: Botevgrad, Bulgaria
- Height: 1.92 m (6 ft 4 in)
- Position: Forward

Team information
- Current team: Balkan Botevgrad (manager)

Senior career*
Years	Team	Apps	(Gls)
1996–1998	Balkan Botevgrad	41	(14)
1998–2000	Slavia Sofia	4	(1)
2000–2001	Botev Vratsa	20	(11)
2001	Svetkavitsa Targovishte	7	(1)
2002–2003	Vidima-Rakovski	19	(5)
2003–2004	Balkan Botevgrad	27	(12)
2004–2005	Rodopa Smolyan	27	(8)
2005–2006	Spartak Pleven	22	(6)
2006–2008	Marek Dupnitsa	50	(9)
2008–2010	Balkan Botevgrad	49	(23)
2010–2011	Akademik Sofia	23	(4)
2011–2014	Lokomotiv 2012 Mezdra	57	(52)
Total		346	(146)

Managerial career
- 2012–2014: Lokomotiv 2012 Mezdra (playing coach)
- 2014–2015: Lokomotiv 2012 Mezdra
- 2015–: Balkan Botevgrad
- * Club domestic league appearances and goals

Ivan Vasilev Redovski (Bulgarian: Иван Редовски; born 10 September 1981) is a Bulgarian footballer who currently plays as a forward.
