= Nedelcho Matushev =

Bulgarian footballer and manager

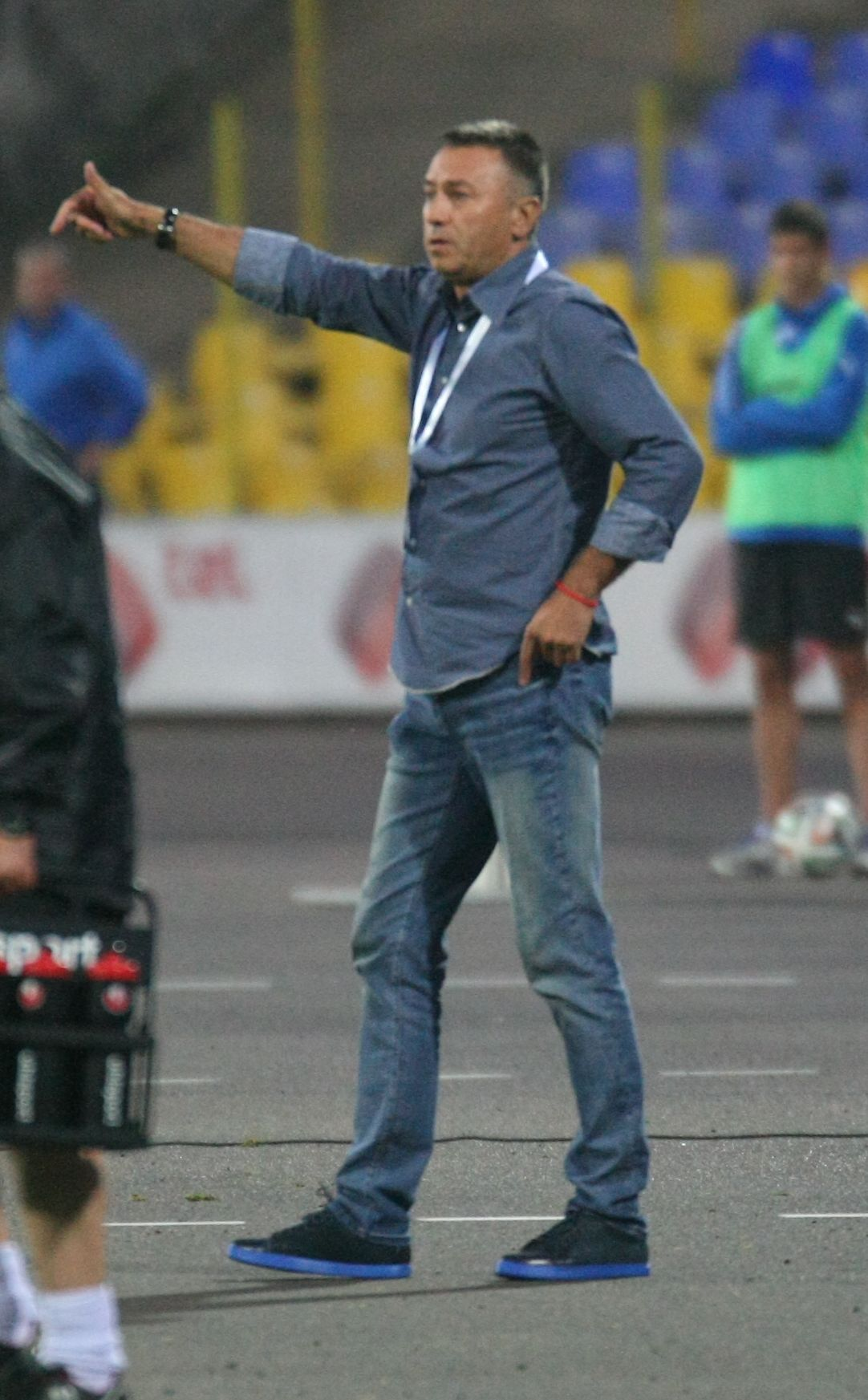

Personal information
- Full name: Nedelcho Stoyanov Matushev
- Date of birth: 14 February 1962 (age 64)
- Place of birth: Kardzhali, Bulgaria
- Position: Defender

Senior career*
Years	Team	Apps	(Gls)
1980–1982	Slavia Sofia		
1982–1988	Neftochimic Burgas		
1988–1989	Spartak Plovdiv		
1989–1990	Neftochimic Burgas		
1990–1991	Rozova Dolina		
1991–1994	Neftochimic Burgas		

Managerial career
- 1995–1996: Neftochimic Burgas Reserves
- 1996–1998: Chernomorets Burgas (assistant)
- 1998–2000: Neftochimic Burgas Reserves U16 & U17
- 2000–2001: Nesebar
- 2001–2003: Neftochimic Burgas
- 2003–2006: Bulgaria U19
- 2006–2007: Bulgaria U21 and Spartak Varna
- 2008: Banants
- 2010–2011: Lokomotiv Plovdiv
- 2011–2012: Chernomorets Pomorie
- 2012–2013: Karpaty Lviv (assistant)
- 2014: Lokomotiv Plovdiv
- 2014–2015: Chernomorets Burgas
- 2015: Pirin Blagoevgrad
- 2017: Chernomorets Burgas (sports director)
- 2017–2018: Stal Kamianske (assistant)
- 2019: Spartak Varna
- 2019–2020: Bulgaria (assistant)
- * Club domestic league appearances and goals

Nedelcho Stoyanov Matushev (Bulgarian: Неделчо Стоянов Матушев; born 14 February 1962) is a Bulgarian football manager and former footballer. He played as a central defender in his career.

Matushev was formerly manager of Neftochimic Burgas, Chernomorets Burgas, Nesebar, Spartak Varna and Bulgaria U-21 and Under-19.

== Biography ==
He is former footballer of Slavia, Neftochimic Burgas, where he spent most of his career, Spartak Plovdiv and Rozova Dolina. As a player plays a central defender position and is characterized by intransigence on the ground, solid game with a head, excellent inclusions in pieces before the opponent's goal.

Matushev is a head coach who tries to use the newest and most modern football theory and practice. He is not afraid to have young players and to work individually with them. Nedelcho likes to work with a strong midfield and to impose (himself on?) the game and to attack on both sides with the wingers and the full backs. He developed a few players who became part of the Bulgarian national team such as Blagoy Georgiev, Vladimir Gadzhev, Georgi Chilikov, Stoyko Sakaliev, Ivelin Popov (Kuban Krasnodar), Nikolay Dimitrov (Kasimpaşa), Valeri Domovchiyski (Hertha BSC), and Vladislav Stoyanov (Sheriff). He worked with them in the U21 and U19 national teams. In August 2012 Matushev moved to Ukraine and started to work at most popular club in the northwestern part of this country - Karpaty Lviv. He was part of the staff of Nikolay Kostov and worked as a first team-coach. Karpaty Lviv started to play much better and more aggressively, but at the end of the season all staff members decided to leave because of internal club problems. In October 2019, Matushev joined Georgi Dermendzhiev's coaching staff, becoming assistant manager of Bulgaria.

== Playing career ==
Matushev start to play professional football in Slavia for two years and after this moved to Bourgas and is now considered one of the true legends in this club Neftochimic, where he was famous for his strong playing style. With this team, he got to the final of Cup of Federarion, but Neftochimic lost.

== Managerial career ==
Achievements: As coach:

2008: Final of the Armenian's Cup

2008: 2nd place in the Armenian L1 Championship

2008: Participation to the 1st round of UEFA Cup

2006: 2nd place in LG Cup (U23) in Vietnam with Bulgarian National Team U21

2005: Winner of Portuguese's "Teju Cup" (U 23) with Bulgarian National U21

2000: Final of Bulgarian's Cup U16

1996: Winner of the L2 Championship

Practice's Education:

2003: 2 weeks trial at Sparta Prague (L1, Czech Republic)

2002: 2 weeks trial at Real Sociedad (L1, Spain)

Education:

Matushev holds the UEFA Pro License and a Football master's degree from National Sports Academy.
