= Georgi Dermendzhiev =

Bulgarian football manager (born 1955)

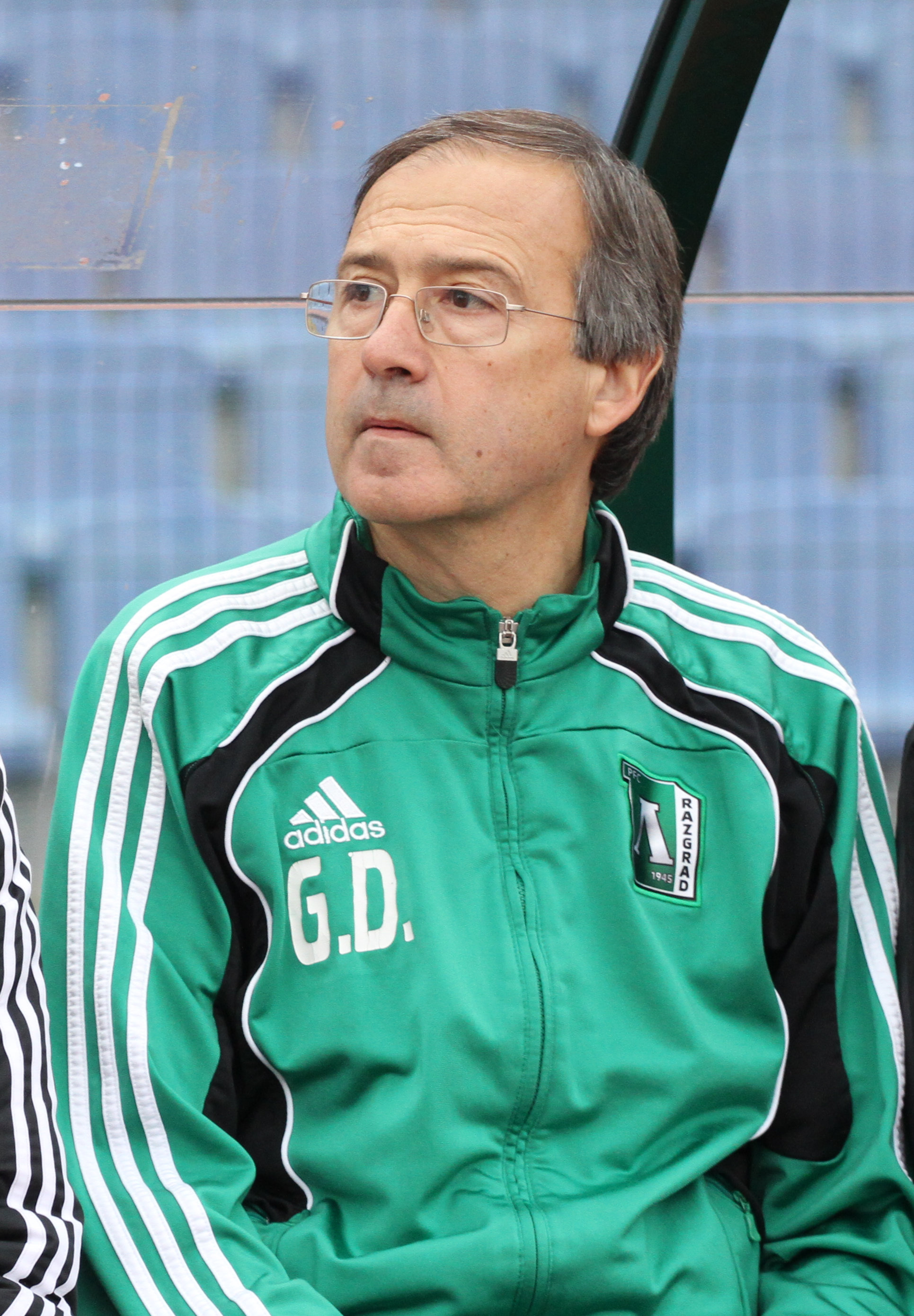
- Dermendzhiev in 2012

Personal information
- Full name: Georgi Nikolov Dermendzhiev
- Date of birth: 4 January 1955 (age 71)
- Place of birth: Plovdiv, Bulgaria
- Position: Defender

Senior career*
Years	Team	Apps	(Gls)
1976–1981	Slavia Sofia	66	(0)
1981–1988	Yantra Gabrovo	153	(5)
1988–1990	Spartak Plovdiv	?	(?)
Total		219	(5)

Managerial career
- 1998–1999: Spartak Plovdiv
- 1999–2008: Litex Lovech (assistant)
- 2008: Botev Plovdiv (assistant)
- 2008–2009: Sliven (assistant)
- 2010–2011: Sliven
- 2011–2014: Ludogorets Razgrad (assistant)
- 2014–2015: Ludogorets Razgrad
- 2015–2017: Ludogorets Razgrad
- 2018: Ordabasy
- 2019: Levski Sofia
- 2019–2020: Bulgaria
- 2023–2024: Ludogorets Razgrad
- * Club domestic league appearances and goals

Georgi Nikolov Dermendziev (Bulgarian: Георги Николов Дерменджиев; born 4 January 1955) is a Bulgarian professional football manager and former player who played as a defender.

== Coaching career ==
After managing Spartak Plovdiv as a head coach for one season, he became an assistant at Litex Lovech under Ferario Spasov. He remained in this role for several years, followed by short spells at Botev Plovdiv and Sliven. He later briefly managed the latter during the 2010-11 A Group, but was unable to help them avoid relegation.

=== Ludogorets Razgrad ===
On July 31, 2014, Dermendzhiev replaced Stoycho Stoev as head coach at Ludogorets following the latter's disappointing 0-0 home draw against Partizan Belgrade in a Champions League qualifying match.

On 27 August 2014, Dermendzhiev became the second Bulgarian manager (after Stanimir Stoilov in 2006) to qualify a team from his country to the group stage of the Champions League. On 22 October 2014 he became the first Bulgarian coach to achieve a win in the Champions League's group phase when Ludogorets beat Basel.

He resigned from the team on 31 May 2015, but after Ludogorets was unsuccessfully led by his successors Bruno Ribeiro and Eduard Eranosyan, he was appointed again as manager on 6 November.

In the 2016–17 Champions League Ludogorets won the qualifiers against Mladost Podgorica and Red Star Belgrade, and the play-off against Viktoria Plzeň, respectively, thus becoming the first Bulgarian team to qualify twice for the group stage of the tournament, both times with Georgi Dermendzhiev as a coach.

Dermendzhiev resigned on 9 August 2017 after the team failed to win the 2017 Bulgarian Supercup.

=== Ordabasy ===
On 9 January 2018 Dermendzhiev signed a deal with the Kazakhstan Premier League team Ordabasy. He left the position in June 2018.

=== Levski Sofia ===
On 22 January 2019, Dermendzhiev returned to Bulgaria, being appointed as head coach of Levski Sofia. He was released from his duties on 29 April 2019.

=== Bulgaria ===
In October 2019, Dermendzhiev was appointed as head coach of the national team to manage the side during the remaining Euro 2020 qualifiers. In April 2020, his contract was extended for an additional six months, with the option for a further one year and a half. In December 2020, the Football Union announced that Dermendzhiev will not continue in his position as manager after the national team failed to qualify for Euro 2020 via the playoff route and was relegated from League B to League C in the Nations League. Dermendzhiev had previously faced strong criticism by Minister of Youth and Sports Krasen Kralev due to the perceived failure to integrate more U-21 players into the senior team and the results attained, including the team's tendency to concede last-minute goals.

=== Ludogorets Razgrad ===
In October 2023, Dermendzhiev was appointed manager of Ludogorets Razgrad for the third time. He successfully led the team to a 13th consecutive league title. In August 2024, Dermendzhiev stepped down as head coach following the club's elimination from the Champions League by Azerbaijani team Qarabagh.

== Managerial statistics ==
As of 13 August 2024

Team	From	To	Record							
Team	From	To	G	W	D	L	Win %	GF	GA	GD
(Bulgaria) Ludogorets Razgrad	31 July 2014	31 May 2015	47	24	12	11	51.06	92	50	+42
(Bulgaria) Ludogorets Razgrad	6 November 2015	10 August 2017	84	53	17	14	63.10	184	74	+110
(Kazakhstan) Ordabasy	9 January 2018	22 January 2019	35	14	8	13	40.00	45	45	0
(Bulgaria) Levski Sofia	22 January 2019	29 April 2019	11	5	3	3	45.45	14	11	+3
Bulgaria	22 October 2019	1 December 2020	11	2	2	7	18.18	7	12	-5
(Bulgaria) Ludogorets Razgrad	23 October 2023	13 August 2024	44	32	3	9	72.73	101	36	+65
Total			222	125	43	54	56.31	430	218	+212

== Career honours ==
=== Player ===
Slavia Sofia

Bulgarian Cup:

- Winners (1): 1979–80

=== Head coach ===
Ludogorets Razgrad

Bulgarian A Group:

- Champions (4): 2014–15, 2015–16, 2016–17, 2023–24

Bulgarian Supercup:

- Winners (2): 2014, 2023

Bulgarian Manager of the Year:

- Winner (1): 2014
