= Aleksandar Manolov =

Bulgarian footballer

Personal information
- Full name: Aleksandar Dimitrov Manolov
- Date of birth: 3 March 1990 (age 36)
- Place of birth: Sofia, Bulgaria
- Height: 1.83 m (6 ft 0 in)
- Position: Attacking midfielder

Senior career*
Years	Team	Apps	(Gls)
2010–2015	Lokomotiv Sofia	36	(1)
2013–2014	→ Marek (loan)	19	(4)
2015	→ Marek (loan)	12	(1)
2015–2016	Septemvri Sofia	35	(12)
2017	Lokomotiv Sofia	11	(1)
2017–2018	Montana	18	(2)
2018–2019	Minyor Pernik	13	(3)
2019	Germanea Sapareva Banya	13	(1)
2019–2020	Slivnishki Geroy Slivnitsa		
2020–2022	FC Drenovets		
- * Club domestic league appearances and goals as of 20:00, 24 September 2024 (UTC)

Aleksandar Dimitrov Manolov (Bulgarian: Александър Димитров Манолов; born 3 March 1990) is a Bulgarian footballer who plays as a midfielder.

== Career ==
In June 2017, Manolov joined Montana. He left the club at the end of the season when his contract expired.

On 6 July 2018, Manolov signed with Minyor Pernik.
