= Atanas Dimitrov =

Bulgarian football midfielder

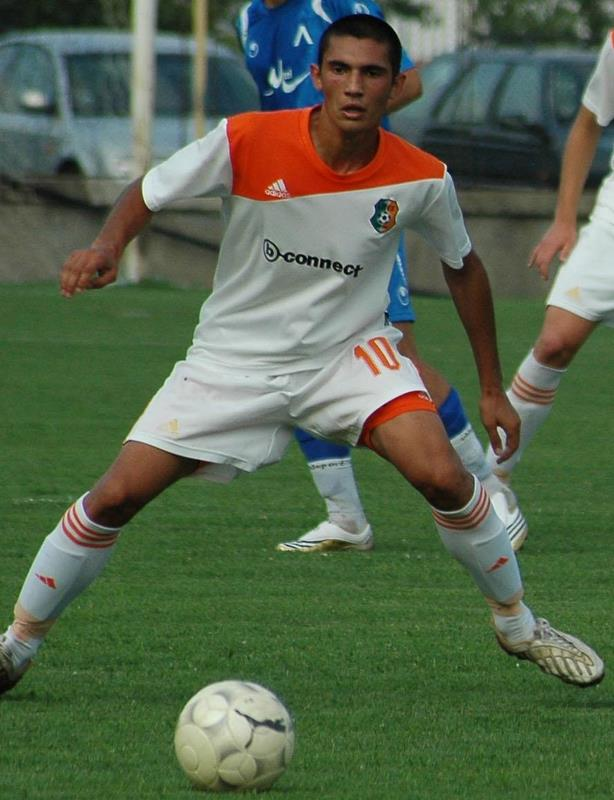

Personal information
- Full name: Atanas Nikolaev Dimitrov
- Date of birth: 17 April 1992 (age 34)
- Place of birth: Petrich, Bulgaria
- Height: 1.84 m (6 ft 1/2 in)
- Position: Midfielder

Team information
- Current team: Pirin Gotse Delchev

Youth career
- Litex Lovech

Senior career*
Years	Team	Apps	(Gls)
2011–2013	Litex Lovech	0	(0)
2011	→ Botev Vratsa (loan)	1	(0)
2012–2013	→ Chavdar Etropole (loan)	35	(2)
2013–2014	Bansko	19	(2)
2014–2016	Lokomotiv GO	38	(1)
2016–2017	Belasitsa Petrich		
2017–2018	Botev Vratsa	23	(2)
2018–2020	Vihren Sandanski	48	(5)
2020–2026	Belasitsa Petrich	?	(4)
2026–	Pirin Gotse Delchev		
- * Club domestic league appearances and goals as of 5 March 2026

Atanas Nikolaev Dimitrov (Bulgarian: Атанас Николаев Димитров; born 17 April 1992) is a Bulgarian football midfielder who currently plays for Pirin Gotse Delchev.

Dimitrov's father Nikolay Dimitrov is former football player, who spent 9 seasons of his career at Litex Lovech, before retiring at the age of 35 in 2005.

== Career ==
Dimitrov began his football career with Litex Lovech. On 14 June 2011, he signed his first professional contract with Litex. One months later, Dimitrov signed for Botev Vratsa on a season-long loan deal.

On 18 August 2016, following a short period out of football, Dimitrov joined Third League club Belasitsa Petrich where his father was appointed as manager. On 19 June 2017, he moved to Botev Vratsa. In June 2018, Dimitrov joined Bansko.
