= Lamjed Chehoudi =

Tunisian footballer

Personal information
- Date of birth: 8 May 1986 (age 40)
- Place of birth: Dubai, United Arab Emirates
- Height: 1.84 m (6 ft 0 in)
- Positions: Winger; second striker

Senior career*
Years	Team	Apps	(Gls)
2004–2006	Racing Club Genève		
2006–2007	Al-Muharraq		
2007–2008	Al-Najma		
2008–2009	Dubai CSC		
2009	Al-Sailiya		
2010	CA Bizertin	12	(7)
2010–2012	Étoile du Sahel	41	(12)
2012–2013	Espérance de Tunis	6	(0)
2014	Stade Tunisien	13	(1)
2014–2015	Lokomotiv Sofia	23	(9)
2015–2017	Elazığspor	34	(2)
2017	Al-Fateh	5	(1)

International career
2011	Tunisia	6	(2)
- * Club domestic league appearances and goals as of 15 April 2017 (UTC)

Lamjed Chehoudi (born 8 May 1986 in Dubai) is an Emirati-born Tunisian footballer who plays as a forward.

== Career statistics ==
As of 1 June 2015

Club statistics
Season	Club	League	League		Cup		Other		Total	
Season	Club	League	App	Goals	App	Goals	App	Goals	App	Goals
2009–10	CA Bizertin	Tunisian Ligue 1	12	7	0	0	-		12	7
2010–11	Étoile du Sahel	Tunisian Ligue 1	22	6	0	0	-		22	6
2011–12	Étoile du Sahel	Tunisian Ligue 1	19	6	0	0	4	1	23	7
2012–13	Espérance de Tunis	Tunisian Ligue 1	6	0	0	0	1	0	7	0
2013–14	Stade Tunisien	Tunisian Ligue 1	13	1	0	0	-		13	1
2014–15	Lokomotiv Sofia	A Group	23	9	3	2	-		26	11

=== International goals ===
Scores and results list Tunisia's goal tally first.

No	Date	Venue	Opponent	Score	Result	Competition
1.	29 May 2011	Stade Olympique de Sousse, Sousse, Tunisia	Central African Republic	2–0	3–0	Friendly
2.	22 August 2011	Amman International Stadium, Amman, Jordan	Jordan	2–1	3–3	Friendly
