= Georgi Georgiev (footballer, born 1981) =

Bulgarian footballer (born 1981)

Personal information
- Full name: Georgi Krasimirov Georgiev
- Date of birth: 25 February 1981 (age 45)
- Place of birth: Teteven, Bulgaria
- Height: 1.83 m (6 ft 0 in)
- Position: Defender

Team information
- Current team: Lokomotiv Mezdra
- Number: 6

Youth career
- Pirin Blagoevgrad

Senior career*
Years	Team	Apps	(Gls)
2002–2010	Pirin Blagoevgrad	147	(8)
2011	Ludogorets Razgrad	6	(0)
2011	Svetkavitsa	6	(1)
2012	Bdin Vidin	8	(2)
2012–2013	Dunav Ruse	?	(?)
2013–2014	Pirin Blagoevgrad	42	(4)
2015	Oborishte	13	(0)
2015	Botev Vratsa	14	(3)
2016–	Lokomotiv Mezdra	12	(0)
- * Club domestic league appearances and goals as of 1 June 2016

Georgi Krasimirov Georgiev (Bulgarian: Георги Красимиров Георгиев; born 25 February 1981) is a Bulgarian footballer who plays as a defender for Lokomotiv Mezdra.
