= Radoslav Rashkov =

Bulgarian footballer

Personal information
- Date of birth: 18 April 1987 (age 39)
- Place of birth: Bulgaria
- Height: 1.87 m (6 ft 2 in)
- Position: Goalkeeper

Team information
- Current team: Pavlikeni

Senior career*
Years	Team	Apps	(Gls)
2007–2009	Etar 1924	1	(0)
2009–2010	Svetkavitsa	14	(0)
2011–2012	Etar 1924	3	(0)
2013–2014	Lyubimets 2007	32	(0)
2014–2016	Lokomotiv GO	22	(0)
2016–	Pavlikeni	0	(0)
- * Club domestic league appearances and goals as of 3 August 2016

Radoslav Rashkov (Bulgarian: Радослав Рашков; born 18 April 1987) is a Bulgarian footballer, who currently plays as a goalkeeper for Pavlikeni.
