= Aleksandar Goranov =

Bulgarian footballer

Personal information
- Full name: Aleksandar Rosenov Goranov
- Date of birth: 7 May 1988 (age 38)
- Place of birth: Bulgaria
- Position: Defender

Team information
- Current team: Botev Ihtiman
- Number: 4

Senior career*
Years	Team	Apps	(Gls)
2007–2009	Marek Dupnitsa	28	(0)
2009	Hebar Pazardzhik		
2009–2010	Rilski Sportist	22	(0)
2010	Kom-Minyor	14	(0)
2011	Chavdar Byala Slatina	16	(0)
2011–2012	Nesebar	20	(0)
2012–2013	Marek Dupnitsa	13	(0)
2013–2014	Akademik Svishtov	14	(0)
2014	Lokomotiv GO	11	(1)
2015	Lokomotiv Plovdiv	6	(0)
2015–2016	Sozopol	12	(0)
2016–2019	Lokomotiv Sofia	68	(5)
2019–	Botev Ihtiman	7	(1)
- * Club domestic league appearances and goals as of 1 August 2020

Aleksandar Goranov (Bulgarian: Александър Горанов; born 7 May 1988) is a Bulgarian footballer, currently playing as a defender for Botev Ihtiman.

== Career ==
=== Botev Ihtiman ===
In October 2019 it was confirmed, that Goranov had joined OFC Botev Ihtiman.
