= Stadion Lokomotiv (Gorna Oryahovitsa) =

Sports venue in Bulgaria

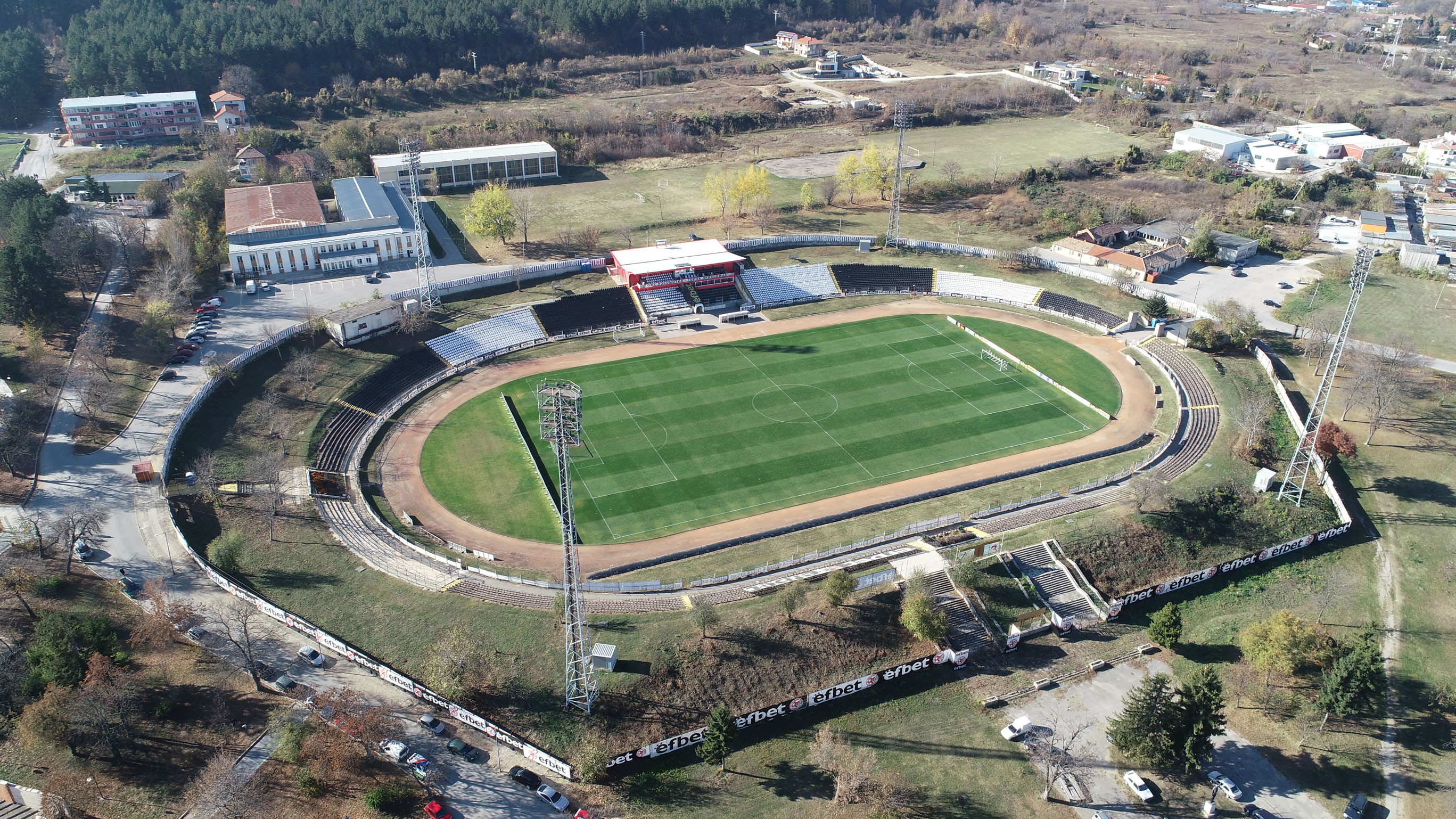
- Interactive map of Stadion Lokomotiv
- Full name: Lokomotiv Stadium
- Location: Gorna Oryahovitsa, Bulgaria
- Coordinates: 43°7′24.6″N 25°40′49.5″E
- Owner: Gorna Oryahovitsa Municipality
- Operator: FC Lokomotiv Gorna Oryahovitsa
- Capacity: 10,500
- Surface: Grass
- Field size: 105 X 68

Construction
- Groundbreaking: 1953
- Opened: August 14, 1956
- Renovated: November 14, 1978, 2016

Tenant
- FC Lokomotiv Gorna Oryahovitsa (1956-present)

Stadion Lokomotiv (Bulgarian: Стадион „Локомотив“) is a multi-purpose stadium in Gorna Oryahovitsa, Bulgaria. Predominantly used for football matches, the stadium has been the home ground of FC Lokomotiv Gorna Oryahovitsa since its opening on 14 August 1956.

The stadium has a seating capacity of 10,500 spectators. In 2016, following Lokomotiv Gorna Oryahovitsa's promotion to the Bulgarian First League, the venue underwent major renovations to comply with league licensing criteria, which included stand repairs, pitch upgrades, and the installation of floodlights.

== 2016 renovations ==
In 2016, following Lokomotiv GO's promotion to the top flight, the stadium underwent major renovations to meet the licensing criteria of the Bulgarian Football Union. As a result, part of the stands were rebuilt, the floodlight system of the stadium was restored and the grass surface was improved. The stadium was opened in December 2016 for Lokomotiv GO's domestic league match against CSKA Sofia, attracting an attendance of 9,000 spectators.

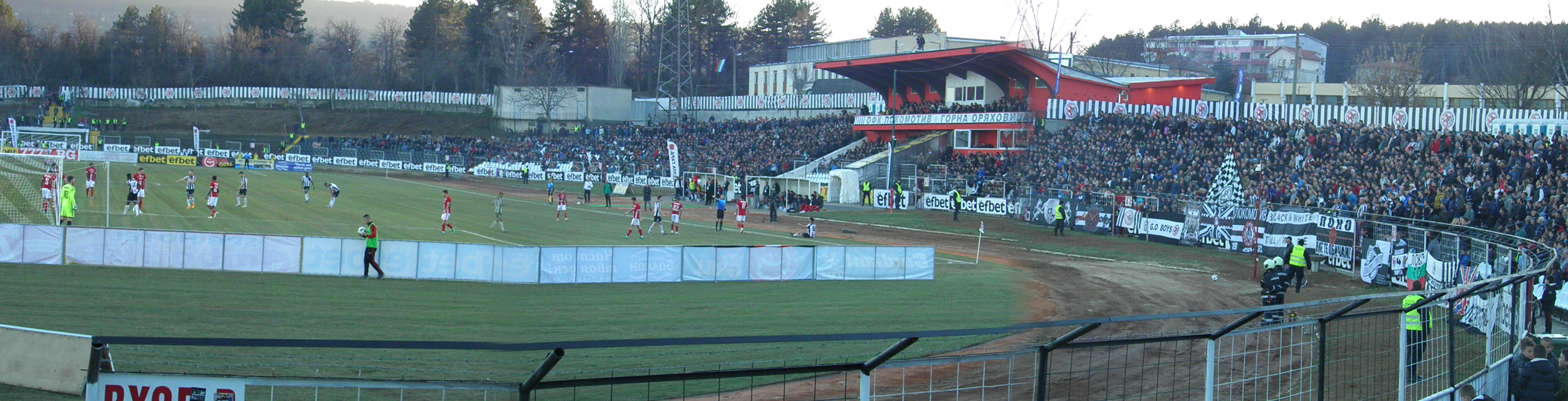
Stadium Gorna Oryahovitsa

== Records ==
The record attendance of the stadium is 19,500 and was achieved at a game between Lokomotiv GO and Levski Sofia.
