= Iliya Karapetrov =

Bulgarian footballer

Personal information
- Full name: Iliya Stoyanov Karapetrov
- Date of birth: 29 April 1992 (age 34)
- Place of birth: Gotse Delchev, Bulgaria
- Height: 1.77 m (5 ft 10 in)
- Position: Midfielder

Senior career*
Years	Team	Apps	(Gls)
2010–2014	Pirin Gotse Delchev	26	(0)
2014–2015	Lokomotiv GO	23	(4)
2015–2016	Pirin Blagoevgrad	16	(1)
2016	Etar	7	(1)
2017	Botev Vratsa	26	(3)
2018	Oborishte	11	(0)
2018	Lokomotiv GO	10	(0)
2019–2020	Bansko	30	(4)
2020–2021	Septemvri Simitli	19	(2)
2021–2022	Pirin Gotse Delchev	36	(6)
2022	Belasitsa Petrich	10	(0)
- * Club domestic league appearances and goals as of 1 January 2023

Iliya Stoyanov Karapetrov (Bulgarian: Илия Стоянов Карапетров; born 29 April 1992) is a Bulgarian footballer who plays as a midfielder.
