= Petar Penchev =

Bulgarian footballer and manager

Personal information
- Full name: Petar Nikolov Penchev
- Date of birth: 12 August 1969 (age 57)
- Place of birth: Plovdiv, Bulgaria
- Position: Defender

Team information
- Current team: Botev Plovdiv U19 (manager)

Youth career
- 1981–1988: Botev Plovdiv

Senior career*
Years	Team	Apps	(Gls)
1989–1995	Spartak Plovdiv	?	(?)
1995–1996	Levski Sofia	23	(0)
1996–2000	Botev Plovdiv	104	(5)
2000–2001	Hebar Pazardzhik	24	(5)
2001–2003	Chernomorets Burgas	?	(?)

Managerial career
- 2012–2013: Chavdar Etropole
- 2013–2014: Bulgaria U17
- 2014–2015: Botev Plovdiv U19
- 2015: Botev Plovdiv
- 2016–2018: Ludogorets Razgrad U19
- 2018–2020: Botev Plovdiv U19
- 2020: Botev Plovdiv
- 2020–: Botev Plovdiv U19
- * Club domestic league appearances and goals

Petar Nikolov Penchev (Bulgarian: Петър Николов Пенчев; born 12 August 1969) is a Bulgarian professional football manager and former player in a defender role, who is the current manager of Botev Plovdiv U19.

== Playing career ==
In the 90s Petar Penchev played for Botev Plovdiv, Spartak Plovdiv, and Levski Sofia. Throughout his career he played in more than 200 official games.

Petar Penchev spent 6 seasons in Spartak Plovdiv. He was a key player for Spartak Plovdiv in season 1994-95 when the team finished on 6th place in A Grupa.

In the summer of 1995 Petar Penchev was transferred to Levski Sofia. He played in 34 games and scored one goal. Penchev participated in 4 games in the European tournaments in the autumn of 1995.

In 1996 Penchev returned to Botev Plovdiv and remained in the team until 2000. He is well known among Botev Plovdiv supporters for his spectacular goal in the 80th minute during the dramatic 4-3 win against Levski Sofia on 6 December 1996.

Penchev also spent a season playing for PFC Hebar Pazardzhik when the team finished on 9th place of A Grupa. At the end of his careers as a professional player he represented Chernomorets Burgas for a couple years.

After his retirement Petar Penchev continues to play for the veterans of Botev Plovdiv. He was part of the team that won the championship in 2013.

== Managing career ==
=== Early career ===
In the spring 2009 Petar Penchev was hired as a manager of Botev Plovdiv and saved the team from relegation. During his first spell as a manager the first team achieved 5 wins and 6 losses.

He worked for 5 years with the youth formations of Botev Plovdiv before joining PFC Chavdar Etropole in 2011. He was manager of the Bulgaria national football team U-17 for a while and after that returned to Botev Plovdiv as a youth coach.

=== Return to Botev Plovdiv ===
On 4 December 2014 Petar Penchev was hired again for Botev Plovdiv manager until the end of the year. Three days later, on 7 December, he made his second debut as Botev Plovdiv manager with the 2-0 home win over PFC Haskovo. A week later his team played well but was defeated with 1-0 by the defending champions Ludogorets Razgrad.

On 15 December it was announced that Petar Penchev's contract has been extended and he will remain manager of Botev Plovdiv until the end of the season. At the end of the month it was officially confirmed that Kostadin Vidolov will be assistant manager.

Botev Plovdiv had an excellent start of 2015. Under Penchev's guidelines the team achieved a 3-0 home victory against Marek Dupnitsa and 0-2 away win in the derby game versus the local rivals Lokomotiv Plovdiv. Five days later, on 15 March, under Penchev's guidelines Botev Plovdiv achieved an important 2-0 win over CSKA Sofia which qualified the team in top 6 playoffs in A Grupa.

Botev Plovdiv visited Razgrad in the first round of the playoffs and the match against the defending champions Ludogorets ended in a 0-0 draw. Under Penchev's guidelines Botev Plovdiv lost 0-1 from Litex Lovech in the next round and made a 0-0 away draw with CSKA Sofia in the third round of the playoffs. In the 4th round of the playoffs Botev Plovdiv made another draw, this time 1-1 with Beroe Stara Zagora.

Unexpectedly, on 2 May, Penchev did not include the captain Ivan Tsvetkov in the squad for the game against Ludogorets Razgrad although he was not injured. After a private discussion between the manager of team and the player Tsvetkov returned in the starting lineup for the next game.

On 16 May, Botev Plovdiv achieved first win in the playoffs over CSKA Sofia with 3-2. In the next round, on 23 May, the team of Botev Plovdiv was defeated with 1-2 in the away game with Beroe Stara Zagora. Lazar Marin scored goals in both games because of Penchev's decision to allow him to play more attacking role.

Botev Plovdiv finished season 2014-15 on 6th place in A Grupa.

Botev Plovdiv started season 2015-16 under Penchev's guidelines with a 1-1 draw with Levski Sofia. A week later, on 25 July, Botev Plovdiv was defeated with the shocking result 6-0 by PFC Montana. Immediately after the game Penchev was released and it was announced that the goalkeeper Mihail Ivanov will no longer play for Botev Plovdiv.
