= Hristo Kolev =

Bulgarian footballer and manager

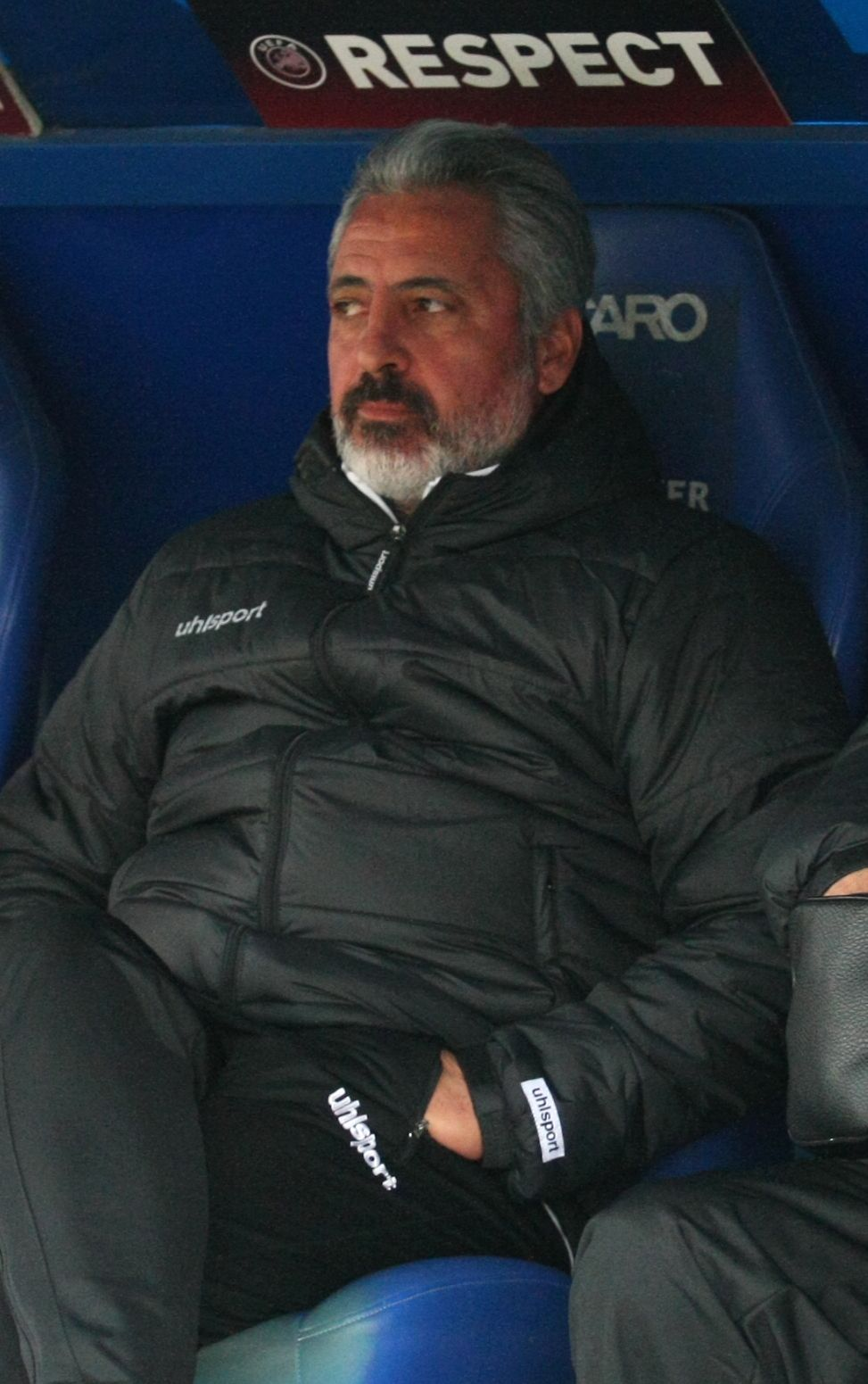

Personal information
- Date of birth: 21 September 1964 (age 62)
- Place of birth: Asenovgrad, Bulgaria
- Height: 1.76 m (5 ft 9 1/2 in)
- Position: Midfielder

Youth career
- 1975–1982: Lokomotiv Plovdiv

Senior career*
Years	Team	Apps	(Gls)
1982–1988	Lokomotiv Plovdiv	111	(47)
1988–1990	Panathinaikos	35	(11)
1990–1992	Athinaikos	36	(9)
1992–1996	Edessaikos	123	(29)
1997–1998	Lokomotiv Plovdiv	24	(5)
Total		329	(101)

International career
1985–1990	Bulgaria	20	(8)

Managerial career
- 2012–2014: Lokomotiv Plovdiv (assistant)
- 2014–2016: Lokomotiv Plovdiv
- 2016: Lokomotiv Plovdiv (assistant)
- 2016: Lokomotiv Plovdiv
- 2016–2017: Lokomotiv Plovdiv (assistant)
- 2022: Lokomotiv Plovdiv
- 2022–2024: Lokomotiv Plovdiv (assistant)
- 2024: Spartak Varna (assistant)
- 2024–2025: CSKA Sofia (assistant)
- * Club domestic league appearances and goals

Hristo Kolev (Bulgarian: Христо Колев; born 21 September 1964) is a Bulgarian football manager and former player.

Nicknamed The Father, Kolev played as a midfielder. A skillful free-kick taker, he scored numerous goals from different positions, in a career which spanned almost 15 years.

== Football career ==
Born in Asenovgrad, Kolev played as a youth for Lokomotiv Plovdiv, then represented professionally Lokomotiv Plovdiv (1981–88, 1997–98), Panathinaikos (1988–90), Athinaikos (1991–92) and Edessaikos (1992–96).

For the Bulgaria national team, he amassed 20 appearances, netting 8 goals. He played all four matches at the 1986 FIFA World Cup in Mexico.

== Honours ==
Lokomotiv Plovdiv

- Cup of the Soviet Army: 1982–83

Panathinaikos

- Alpha Ethniki: 1989–90
- Greek Cup: 1988–89
- Greek Super Cup: 1988

Edessaikos

- Balkans Cup: 1992–93
