= 2022–23 Al-Tai FC season =

Al-Tai
2022–23 season
- President: Turki Al-Dhabaan
- Manager: Pepa (until 22 January); Mirel Rădoi (from 22 January until 18 May); José Pedro Barreto (from 18 May)
- Stadium: Prince Abdul Aziz bin Musa'ed Stadium
- Pro League: 9th
- King Cup: Round of 16 (knocked out by Al-Fateh)
- Top goalscorer: League: Guy Mbenza; Amir Sayoud (10 goals each); All: Guy Mbenza; Amir Sayoud (10 goals each)
- Highest home attendance: 9,632 (vs. Al-Hilal, 15 October 2022)
- Lowest home attendance: 5,584 (vs. Al-Batin, 31 December 2022)
- Average home league attendance: 7,288
- All statistics correct as of 31 May 2023.

The 2022–23 season was Al-Tai's 24th non-consecutive season in the Pro League and their 62nd season in existence. The club participated in the Pro League and the King Cup.

The season covers the period from 1 July 2022 to 30 June 2023.

== Players ==
=== Squad information ===
As of 1 February 2023

Note: Flags indicate national team as defined under FIFA eligibility rules; some limited exceptions apply. Players may hold more than one non-FIFA nationality.

No.	Pos.	Nation	Player
1	GK	BRA	Victor Braga
2	DF	SWE	Mohamed Youla
3	DF	KSA	Abdulaziz Majrashi
4	DF	KSA	Abdulkarim Al-Sultan
5	DF	VEN	Adrián Martínez
6	MF	KSA	Abdulaziz Al-Harabi
7	MF	KSA	Mukhtar Ali (on loan from Al-Nassr)
8	MF	BRA	Dener
9	FW	CGO	Guy Mbenza
10	MF	ALG	Amir Sayoud
11	MF	ZIM	Knowledge Musona
12	DF	KSA	Hussain Qassem
13	MF	KSA	Salem Al-Toiawy
15	MF	KSA	Abdulwahab Jaafer
18	MF	KSA	Mohammed Al-Qunaian
19	DF	KSA	Hassan Al-Jubairi

No.	Pos.	Nation	Player
21	DF	KSA	Ibrahim Al-Ali
22	GK	KSA	Bader Al-Enezi
23	DF	KSA	Nawaf Al-Qumairi
24	MF	KSA	Khalil Al-Absi (on loan from Al-Nassr)
26	MF	KSA	Jamal Bajandouh
27	MF	KSA	Abdullah Al-Jouei (on loan from Al-Shabab)
30	MF	GNB	Alfa Semedo
31	MF	KSA	Abdullah Nahar
32	FW	KSA	Fahad Al-Johani
34	DF	KSA	Yazan Al-Buhairan
40	DF	CMR	Collins Fai
44	GK	KSA	Moataz Al-Baqaawi
45	DF	KSA	Abdulmohsen Fallatah
75	MF	KSA	Mohammed Harzan
77	GK	KSA	Turki Al-Shammari
99	FW	KSA	Hazaa Al-Hazaa

=== Out on loan ===
Note: Flags indicate national team as defined under FIFA eligibility rules; some limited exceptions apply. Players may hold more than one non-FIFA nationality.

No.	Pos.	Nation	Player
20	FW	KSA	Adeeb Al-Haizan (at Al-Orobah until 30 June 2023)
80	MF	KSA	Abdullah Hajaj (at Al-Shoulla until 30 June 2023)
87	DF	KSA	Mohammed Marzouq (at Wej until 30 June 2023)

No.	Pos.	Nation	Player
—	MF	KSA	Talal Al-Showaiqi (at Al-Orobah until 30 June 2023)
—	FW	SUI	Cephas Malele (at CFR Cluj until 30 June 2023)

== Transfers and loans ==
=== Transfers in ===
Entry date	Position	No.	Player	From club	Fee	Ref.
30 June 2022	DF	2	(Saudi Arabia) Nasser Al-Hulayel	(Saudi Arabia) Al-Khaleej	End of loan	
30 June 2022	DF	–	(Saudi Arabia) Majid Shami	(Saudi Arabia) Al-Rayyan	End of loan	
30 June 2022	MF	17	(Saudi Arabia) Khaled Eid	(Saudi Arabia) Hajer	End of loan	
30 June 2022	MF	29	(Saudi Arabia) Faisal Al-Musallamani	(Saudi Arabia) Al-Lewaa	End of loan	
30 June 2022	MF	85	(Saudi Arabia) Omar Al-Aidaa	(Saudi Arabia) Al-Lewaa	End of loan	
6 July 2022	GK	1	(Brazil) Victor Braga	(Portugal) Arouca	Free	
6 July 2022	DF	45	(Saudi Arabia) Abdulmohsen Fallatah	(Saudi Arabia) Al-Ittihad	Free	
13 July 2022	GK	44	(Saudi Arabia) Moataz Al-Baqaawi	(Saudi Arabia) Al-Taawoun	Free	
14 July 2022	MF	18	(Saudi Arabia) Mohammed Al-Qunaian	(Saudi Arabia) Al-Khaleej	Free	
16 July 2022	FW	9	(Republic of the Congo) Guy Mbenza	(Belgium) Antwerp	$700,000	
27 July 2022	DF	2	(Sweden) Mohamed Youla	(Sweden) GAIS	Free	
27 July 2022	DF	23	(Saudi Arabia) Nawaf Al-Qumairi	(Saudi Arabia) Al-Shabab	Free	
27 July 2022	MF	26	(Saudi Arabia) Jamal Bajandouh	(Saudi Arabia) Al-Shabab	Free	
28 July 2022	DF	12	(Saudi Arabia) Hussain Qassem	(Saudi Arabia) Al-Faisaly	Undisclosed	
10 August 2022	MF	30	(Guinea-Bissau) Alfa Semedo	(Portugal) Vitória	$800,000	
29 August 2022	DF	5	(Venezuela) Adrián Martínez	(Bolivia) Always Ready	Free	
31 August 2022	FW	99	(Saudi Arabia) Hazaa Al-Hazaa	(Saudi Arabia) Al-Ettifaq	$532,000	

=== Loans in ===
Start date	End date	Position	No.	Player	From club	Fee	Ref.
27 July 2022	End of season	FW	24	(Saudi Arabia) Khalil Al-Absi	(Saudi Arabia) Al-Nassr	None	
29 August 2022	End of season	MF	7	(Saudi Arabia) Mukhtar Ali	(Saudi Arabia) Al-Nassr	None	
30 August 2022	End of season	MF	27	(Saudi Arabia) Abdullah Al-Jouei	(Saudi Arabia) Al-Shabab	None	

=== Transfers out ===
Exit date	Position	No.	Player	To club	Fee	Ref.
30 June 2022	GK	1	(Saudi Arabia) Nawaf Al-Aqidi	(Saudi Arabia) Al-Nassr	End of loan	
30 June 2022	DF	23	(Saudi Arabia) Abdullah Hassoun	(Saudi Arabia) Al-Ahli	End of loan	
30 June 2022	DF	55	(Saudi Arabia) Rayane Hamidou	(Saudi Arabia) Al-Ahli	End of loan	
30 June 2022	MF	16	(Saudi Arabia) Mohammed Attiyah	(Saudi Arabia) Al-Shabab	End of loan	
30 June 2022	MF	18	(Saudi Arabia) Abdulkareem Al-Qahtani	(Saudi Arabia) Al-Wehda	End of loan	
30 June 2022	MF	26	(Saudi Arabia) Jamal Bajandouh	(Saudi Arabia) Al-Shabab	End of loan	
30 June 2022	MF	42	(Saudi Arabia) Hamed Fallatah	(Saudi Arabia) Al-Faisaly	End of loan	
30 June 2022	MF	79	(Saudi Arabia) Mukhtar Ali	(Saudi Arabia) Al-Nassr	End of loan	
30 June 2022	FW	30	(Argentina) Tobías Figueroa	(Chile) Deportes Antofagasta	End of loan	
30 June 2022	FW	70	(Saudi Arabia) Mohammed Al-Thani	(Saudi Arabia) Ohod	End of loan	
30 June 2022	FW	99	(Saudi Arabia) Mohammed Maran	(Saudi Arabia) Al-Nassr	End of loan	
18 July 2022	DF	13	(Saudi Arabia) Ibrahim Al-Zubaidi	(Saudi Arabia) Al-Ahli	Free	
20 July 2022	MF	7	(Saudi Arabia) Mohammed Al-Aqel	(Saudi Arabia) Al-Riyadh	Free	
29 July 2022	DF	44	(Brazil) Marcelo	(United Arab Emirates) Dibba Al Fujairah	Free	
12 August 2022	MF	17	(Saudi Arabia) Khaled Eid	(Saudi Arabia) Al-Riyadh	Free	
1 September 2022	MF	29	(Saudi Arabia) Faisal Al-Musallamani		Released	
1 September 2022	MF	85	(Saudi Arabia) Omar Al-Aidaa		Released	
16 September 2022	DF	2	(Saudi Arabia) Nasser Al-Hulayel	(Saudi Arabia) Al-Ain	Free	
30 March 2023	FW	9	(Switzerland) Cephas Malele	(China) Shanghai Shenhua	Free	

=== Loans out ===
Start date	End date	Position	No.	Player	To club	Fee	Ref.
4 August 2022	30 March 2023	FW	9	(Switzerland) Cephas Malele	(Romania) CFR Cluj	None	
1 September 2022	End of season	MF	–	(Saudi Arabia) Talal Al-Showaiqi	(Saudi Arabia) Al-Orobah	None	
1 September 2022	End of season	FW	20	(Saudi Arabia) Adeeb Al-Haizan	(Saudi Arabia) Al-Orobah	None	
3 September 2022	1 January 2023	DF	87	(Saudi Arabia) Mohammed Marzouq	(Saudi Arabia) Al-Shoulla	None	
3 September 2022	End of season	MF	80	(Saudi Arabia) Abdullah Hajaj	(Saudi Arabia) Al-Shoulla	None	
25 January 2023	End of season	DF	87	(Saudi Arabia) Mohammed Marzouq	(Saudi Arabia) Wej	None	

== Pre-season ==
29 July 2022 Friendly	Al-Tai (Saudi Arabia)	1–1	(Turkey) Altay	Afyonkarahisar, Turkey
TRT	Jaafer	Report

5 August 2022 Friendly	Al-Tai (Saudi Arabia)	0–0	(Turkey) Bursaspor	Afyonkarahisar, Turkey
19:00 TRT		Report		Stadium: Afyon Kocatepe Stadium

21 August 2022 Friendly	Al-Tai (Saudi Arabia)	1–0	(Saudi Arabia) Al-Rayyan	Ha'il, Saudi Arabia
20:00 AST	Mbenza 50'	Report		Stadium: Al-Tai Club Stadium

== Competitions ==
=== Overview ===
Competition	Record							
Competition	G	W	D	L	GF	GA	GD	Win %
Pro League	30	10	4	16	41	49	−8	33.33
King Cup	1	0	1	0	2	2	+0	0.00
Total	31	10	5	16	43	51	−8	32.26

Updated to match played 31 May 2023
Source: Competitions

=== Pro League ===
==== League table ====
Pos	Team	Pld	W	D	L	GF	GA	GD	Pts	Qualification or relegation
7	Al-Ettifaq	30	10	7	13	28	36	−8	37	
8	Damac	30	9	9	12	33	43	−10	36	
9	Al-Tai	30	10	4	16	41	49	−8	34 (Note: Al-Tai finished ahead of Al-Raed on head-to-head points: Al-Tai: 4 pts, Al-Raed: 1 pts (Al-Raed 0–2 Al-Tai, Al-Tai 2–2 Al-Raed).)	
10	Al-Raed	30	9	7	14	41	49	−8	34	
11	Al-Fayha (Note: Al-Fayha qualified for the AFC Champions League group stage as the 2021–22 King Cup winners.)	30	8	9	13	31	43	−12	33 (Note: Al-Fayha finished ahead of Abha on head-to-head points: Al-Fayha: 4 pts, Abha: 1 pts (Abha 1–1 Al-Fayha, Al-Fayha 2–0 Abha).)	Qualified for the AFC Champions League group stage

Updated to match(es) played on 31 May 2023. Source: SPL
Rules for classification: 1) Points; 2) Head-to-head points; 3) Head-to-head goal difference; 4) Total goal difference; 5) Total goals scored; 6) Fair-play points (Note: Head-to-head record is used only after all the matches between the teams in question have been played).

==== Results summary ====
Overall								Home						Away					
Pld	W	D	L	GF	GA	GD	Pts	W	D	L	GF	GA	GD	W	D	L	GF	GA	GD
30	10	4	16	41	49	−8	34	7	1	7	22	19	+3	3	3	9	19	30	−11

Last updated: 31 May 2023.
Source: spl.com.sa

==== Results by round ====
Round	1	2	3	4	5	6	7	8	9	10	11	12	13	14	15	16	17	18	19	20	21	22	23	24	25	26	27	28	29	30
Ground	A	H	A	H	A	H	A	H	A	A	H	A	H	A	H	H	A	H	A	H	A	H	A	H	H	A	H	A	H	A
Result	W	W	L	W	L	W	W	L	L	L	W	L	L	L	L	W	D	L	W	L	D	D	D	W	W	L	L	L	L	L
Position	5	5	7	5	8	6	4	7	7	9	7	7	9	9	10	9	8	8	7	8	8	8	8	7	7	7	7	8	8	9

Updated to match(es) played on 31 May 2023. Source: spl.com.sa
A = Away; H = Home; W = Win; D = Draw; L = Loss

==== Matches ====
All times are local, AST (UTC+3).

Win Draw Loss Postponed

26 August 2022 1	Al-Ettifaq	1–2	Al-Tai	Dammam
18:45	Al-Kuwaykibi 22'; Al-Mowalad (yellow card) 26'	Report	Mbenza 6'; Al-Jubairi (yellow card) 26'; Fai (yellow card) 56'; Al-Qunaian 65'	Stadium: Prince Mohamed bin Fahd Stadium; Attendance: 3,878; Referee: Sami Al-Jires

2 September 2022 2	Al-Tai	1–0	Al-Adalah	Ha'il
19:00	Harzan 15', (yellow card) 61'; Semedo (yellow card) 43'	Report	Al-Burayh (yellow card) 30'; Al-Habib (yellow card) 58'; Al-Abdeli (yellow card) 61'; Edson (yellow card) 83'	Stadium: Prince Abdul Aziz bin Musa'ed Stadium; Attendance: 6,724; Referee: Abdullah Al-Kharboush

8 September 2022 3	Al-Shabab	4–0	Al-Tai	Riyadh
21:00	Al=Sqoor (yellow card) 15'; Guanca 27', 70' (pen.); Mina (yellow card) 50'; Boupendza 62' (pen.); Carlos 82'	Report	Semedo (yellow card) 9'; Al-Jubairi (yellow card) 61'	Stadium: Prince Faisal bin Fahd Stadium; Attendance: 9,379; Referee: Sami Al-Jires

14 September 2022 4	Al-Tai	1–0	Al-Fateh	Ha'il
18:55	Dener 47'; Fai (yellow card) 79'; Al-Qumairi (yellow card) 87'	Report	Petros (yellow card) 83'	Stadium: Prince Abdul Aziz bin Musa'ed Stadium; Attendance: 7,962; Referee: Abdullah Al-Harbi

1 October 2022 5	Damac	2–0	Al-Tai	Abha
18:30	Al-Ammar 53'; Zeghba 78'	Report	Musona (yellow card) 31'; Qassem (yellow card) 88'	Stadium: Prince Sultan bin Abdul Aziz Stadium; Attendance: 1,608; Referee: Shukri Al-Hanfoush

6 October 2022 6	Al-Tai	3–0	Al-Khaleej	Ha'il
18:30	Musona 18' (pen.), 53', 61'; Al-Harabi (yellow card) 45+1'; Ali (yellow card) 72'	Report		Stadium: Prince Abdul Aziz bin Musa'ed Stadium; Attendance: 7,455; Referee: Mohammed Al-Harbi

10 October 2022 7	Al-Raed	0–2	Al-Tai	Buraidah
18:15	Al-Fahad (yellow card) 57'; Khamis (yellow card) 90+5'	Report	Mbenza 18'; Qassem (yellow card) 27'; Sayoud 36'; Al-Harabi (red card) 45'	Stadium: King Abdullah Sport City Stadium; Attendance: 3,810; Referee: Abdullah Al-Shehri

15 October 2022 8	Al-Tai	2–3	Al-Hilal	Ha'il
18:30	Fai (yellow card) 35'; Musona (yellow card) 52'; Mbenza 57'; Sayoud 64', (yellow card) 74'	Report	Ighalo 39'; Michael 50', (yellow card) 90+2'; Al-Bulaihi 90'	Stadium: Prince Abdul Aziz bin Musa'ed Stadium; Attendance: 9,632; Referee: Mohammed Al-Hoaish

16 December 2022 9	Abha	2–1	Al-Tai	Abha
15:30	Amr (yellow card) 48'; Bguir 81'; Matić (yellow card) 90+2'; Al-Amri 90+5', (yellow card) 90+13'	Report	Musona (yellow card) 23'; Semedo (yellow card) 57'; Sayoud 75', (red card) 90+12'; Al-Qumairi (yellow card) 85'; Al-Harabi (yellow card) 89'	Stadium: Prince Sultan bin Abdul Aziz Stadium; Attendance: 600; Referee: Khaled Al-Teris

26 December 2022 10	Al-Fayha	2–1	Al-Tai	Al Majma'ah
18:00	Paulinho 3'; Nwakaeme 21'; Al-Khalaf (yellow card) 26'; Abousaban (yellow card) 43'	Report	Qassem (yellow card) 30'; Dener 45+2'	Stadium: Al Majma'ah Sports City; Attendance: 2,079; Referee: Ahmed Al-Rumaikhani

31 December 2022 11	Al-Tai	4–0	Al-Batin	Ha'il
15:30	Dener 4'; Semedo 52'; Mbenza 56'; Sayoud 66'	Report		Stadium: Prince Abdul Aziz bin Musa'ed Stadium; Attendance: 5,584; Referee: Shukri Al-Hanfoush

6 January 2023 12	Al-Nassr	2–0	Al-Tai	Riyadh
18:00	Talisca 42', 47'	Report	Al-Qumairi (yellow card) 22'; Al-Sultan (yellow card) 38'; Dener (yellow card) 49'	Stadium: Mrsool Park; Attendance: 11,721; Referee: Abdullah Al-Harbi

12 January 2023 13	Al-Tai	1–3	Al-Taawoun	Ha'il
15:30	Mbenza 4'; Fai (yellow card) 45+5'	Report	Kadesh 26'; Kaku (yellow card) 28', (goal) 90+7'; Medrán 59'	Stadium: Prince Abdul Aziz bin Musa'ed Stadium; Attendance: 6,141; Referee: Mamdouh Al Shahdan

21 January 2023 14	Al-Wehda	1–0	Al-Tai	Mecca
18:00	Rodrigues 65'; Al-Ghamdi (yellow card) 78'	Report	Martínez (yellow card) 73'; Semedo (yellow card) 90+3'; Braga (yellow card) 90+5'	Stadium: King Abdul Aziz Stadium; Attendance: 2,112; Referee: Raed Al-Zahrani

27 January 2023 18	Al-Tai	1–2	Al-Shabab	Ha'il
18:00	Sayoud 9'; Al-Sultan (yellow card) 33'; Ali (yellow card) 43'; Martínez (yellow card) 64'	Report	Carlos 18', 38'; Al-Qahtani (yellow card) 90+4'	Stadium: Prince Abdul Aziz bin Musa'ed Stadium; Attendance: 8,680; Referee: Sultan Al-Harbi

4 February 2023 15	Al-Tai	0–1	Al-Ittihad	Ha'il
16:00	Martínez (yellow card) 49'; Fai (yellow card) 68'; Al-Sultan (yellow card) 90+3'	Report	Henrique (yellow card) 59'; Bamsaud (yellow card) 61'; Coronado 90+5'	Stadium: Prince Abdul Aziz bin Musa'ed Stadium; Attendance: 8,957; Referee: Srđan Jovanović (Serbia)

10 February 2023 16	Al-Tai	2–0	Al-Ettifaq	Ha'il
16:00	Ali 20'; Sayoud 63'; Al-Johani (yellow card) 76'	Report		Stadium: Prince Abdul Aziz bin Musa'ed Stadium; Attendance: 6,027; Referee: Abdulsamad Bakri

16 February 2023 17	Al-Adalah	2–2	Al-Tai	Al-Hasa
18:00	Al-Hamdhi (yellow card) 37'; Lenis (yellow card) 45+3'; Gonzáles 59'; Antonsson 68'	Report	Musona 63'; Ali 65', (yellow card) 90+10'	Stadium: Prince Abdullah bin Jalawi Stadium; Attendance: 9,879; Referee: Mohammed Al-Beredi

2 March 2023 19	Al-Fateh	2–3	Al-Tai	Al-Hasa
16:00	Al-Buraikan 7', 70'; Al-Fuhaid (yellow card) 55'	Report	Musona 17', 90+2'; Mbenza 29'; Semedo (yellow card) 45+1'	Stadium: Prince Abdullah bin Jalawi Stadium; Attendance: 12,271; Referee: Sultan Okairy

11 March 2023 20	Al-Tai	1–3	Damac	Ha'il
16:00	Ali (yellow card) 11'; Al-Jubairi (yellow card) 24'; Harzan 33'; Fai (yellow card) 75'	Report	Munshi (yellow card) 29'; Al-Nakhli (yellow card) 45+2'; A. Al-Shahrani 46'; Makin 64'; Al-Jubairi 74' (o.g.); Bedrane (yellow card) 89'; Nono (yellow card) 90+3'	Stadium: Prince Abdul Aziz bin Musa'ed Stadium; Attendance: 5,890; Referee: Khaled Al-Ahmari

16 March 2023 21	Al-Khaleej	2–2	Al-Tai	Dammam
16:00	Cikalleshi 13'; Al-Abdan 45+3'; Martins (yellow card) 81'; Friedrich (yellow card) 90+1'	Report	Fai (yellow card) 24'; Al-Johani 79'; Al-Harabi (yellow card) 89'; Friedrich 90+3'	Stadium: Prince Mohamed bin Fahd Stadium; Attendance: 1,788; Referee: Mamdouh Al Shahdan

5 April 2023 22	Al-Tai	2–2	Al-Raed	Ha'il
22:00	Mbenza 24', 32', (yellow card) 36'; Sayoud (yellow card) 90+4'	Report	Mitriță 8'; Fouzair 28'	Stadium: Prince Abdul Aziz bin Musa'ed Stadium; Attendance: 7,246; Referee: Shukri Al-Hanfoush

10 April 2023 23	Al-Hilal	2–2	Al-Tai	Riyadh
22:00	Al-Shehri 57'; Michael 72'	Report	Mbenza 25'; Sayoud 35'; Braga (yellow card) 61'; Al-Qumairi (yellow card) 71'; Qassem (yellow card) 89'; Majrashi (yellow card) 90+5'	Stadium: Prince Faisal bin Fahd Stadium; Attendance: 6,081; Referee: Georgi Kabakov (Bulgaria)

27 April 2023 24	Al-Tai	1–0	Abha	Ha'il
19:00	Sayoud 25'; Majrashi (yellow card) 45+1'; Semedo (yellow card) 69'; Musona (yellow card) 84'	Report	Al-Jumayah (yellow card) 15'	Stadium: Prince Abdul Aziz bin Musa'ed Stadium; Attendance: 5,879; Referee: Mohammed Al-Daqqash

2 May 2023 25	Al-Tai	2–1	Al-Fayha	Ha'il
21:30	Sayoud 6'; Semedo 38'	Report	Semedo 19' (o.g.)	Stadium: Prince Abdul Aziz bin Musa'ed Stadium; Attendance: 7,649; Referee: Abdulrahman Al-Sultan

10 May 2023 26	Al-Batin	4–3	Al-Tai	Hafar al-Batin
19:00	Bukia (yellow card) 26'; Al-Hurayji (yellow card) 30'; López 45+3', 90+11' (pen.), (yellow card) 78'; Y. Al-Shammari 52'; Fawaz (yellow card) 86'; Roa 87'	Report	Sayoud 14'; Mbenza 18'; Musona 28' (pen.); Qassem (yellow card) 65'; Al-Jouei (yellow card) 73'; Dener (yellow card) 78'	Stadium: Al-Batin Club Stadium; Attendance: 3,217; Referee: Mohammed Al-Hoaish

16 May 2023 27	Al-Tai	0–2	Al-Nassr	Ha'il
21:30	Fai (yellow card) 76'	Report	Al-Khaibari (yellow card) 18'; Ronaldo (yellow card) 48', (goal) 52' (pen.); Talisca 80'	Stadium: Prince Abdul Aziz bin Musa'ed Stadium; Attendance: 9,632; Referee: Abdullah Al-Kharboush

22 May 2023 28	Al-Taawoun	2–1	Al-Tai	Buraidah
21:30	Medrán (yellow card) 15'; El Mahdioui (yellow card) 19'; Al-Rashidi 28'; Tawamba 72'; Al-Nabit (yellow card) 90+1'; Balobaid (yellow card) 90+5'	Report	Harzan 55'; Qassem (yellow card) 65'	Stadium: Al-Taawoun Club Stadium; Attendance: 5,193; Referee: Mohammed Al-Beredi

27 May 2023 29	Al-Tai	1–2	Al-Wehda	Ha'il
21:00	Musona 11'	Report	Al-Hafith 34', (yellow card) 90+4'; Noor 78'	Stadium: Prince Abdul Aziz bin Musa'ed Stadium; Attendance: 5,859; Referee: Shukri Al-Hanfoush

31 May 2023 30	Al-Ittihad	2–0	Al-Tai	Jeddah
21:00	Al-Olayan (yellow card) 45'; Henrique (yellow card) 50'; Bamsaud (yellow card) 57'; Hamdallah 73' (pen.); Costa 90+6'	Report	Qassem (yellow card) 90+8'	Stadium: King Abdullah Sports City; Attendance: 59,892; Referee: Abdullah Al-Shehri

=== King Cup ===
All times are local, AST (UTC+3).

22 December 2022 Round of 16	Al-Fateh	2–2 (a.e.t.) (7–6 p)	Al-Tai	Al-Hasa
18:00	Batna 12'; Boushal (yellow card) 67'; Buhimed (yellow card) 90+10'; Al Salis 112'	Report	Martínez (yellow card) 9'; Dener (yellow card) 61'; Musona 65'; Qassem (yellow card) 77'; Majrashi (yellow card) 90+12'; Al-Jubairi (yellow card) 105+4'; Al Salis 119' (o.g.)	Stadium: Prince Abdullah bin Jalawi Stadium; Attendance: 608; Referee: Abdullah Al-Harbi
	Penalties
	Saâdane (penalty scored); Buhimed (penalty scored); Al-Buraikan (penalty scored); Valera (penalty scored); Al Salis (penalty scored); Vélez (penalty scored); Boushal (penalty scored)		(penalty scored) Dener; (penalty scored) Mbenza; (penalty scored) Semedo; (penalty scored) Al-Harabi; (penalty scored) Al-Jubairi; (penalty scored) Martínez; (penalty missed) Harzan

== Statistics ==
=== Appearances ===
Last updated on 31 May 2023.

No.	Pos	Nat	Player	Total		Pro League		King Cup	
No.	Pos	Nat	Player	Apps	Goals	Apps	Goals	Apps	Goals
Goalkeepers
1	GK	(Brazil) BRA	Victor Braga	31	0	30	0	1	0
44	GK	(Saudi Arabia) KSA	Moataz Al-Baqaawi	0	0	0	0	0	0
Defenders
3	DF	(Saudi Arabia) KSA	Abdulaziz Majrashi	14	0	5+8	0	0+1	0
4	DF	(Saudi Arabia) KSA	Abdulkarim Al-Sultan	24	0	24	0	0	0
5	DF	(Venezuela) VEN	Adrián Martínez	9	0	8	0	1	0
12	DF	(Saudi Arabia) KSA	Hussain Qassem	25	0	23+1	0	1	0
13	DF	(Saudi Arabia) KSA	Salem Al-Toiawy	6	0	0+6	0	0	0
19	DF	(Saudi Arabia) KSA	Hassan Al-Jubairi	16	0	14+1	0	0+1	0
21	DF	(Saudi Arabia) KSA	Ibrahim Al Ali	0	0	0	0	0	0
23	DF	(Saudi Arabia) KSA	Nawaf Al-Qumairi	22	0	10+11	0	1	0
40	DF	(Cameroon) CMR	Collins Fai	25	0	25	0	0	0
45	DF	(Saudi Arabia) KSA	Abdulmohsen Fallatah	4	0	2+1	0	1	0
Midfielders
6	MF	(Saudi Arabia) KSA	Abdulaziz Al-Harabi	9	0	4+4	0	0+1	0
7	MF	(Saudi Arabia) KSA	Mukhtar Ali	28	2	22+5	2	1	0
8	MF	(Brazil) BRA	Dener	25	3	22+2	3	1	0
10	MF	(Algeria) ALG	Amir Sayoud	27	10	26+1	10	0	0
11	MF	(Zimbabwe) ZIM	Knowledge Musona	30	9	29	8	1	1
15	MF	(Saudi Arabia) KSA	Abdulwahab Jaafer	4	0	0+4	0	0	0
18	MF	(Saudi Arabia) KSA	Mohammed Al-Qunaian	7	1	1+6	1	0	0
24	MF	(Saudi Arabia) KSA	Khalil Al-Absi	22	0	8+13	0	0+1	0
26	MF	(Saudi Arabia) KSA	Jamal Bajandouh	8	0	1+7	0	0	0
27	MF	(Saudi Arabia) KSA	Abdullah Al-Jouei	12	0	1+10	0	1	0
30	MF	(Guinea-Bissau) GNB	Alfa Semedo	29	2	28	2	1	0
31	MF	(Saudi Arabia) KSA	Abdullah Nahar	0	0	0	0	0	0
75	MF	(Saudi Arabia) KSA	Mohammed Harzan	23	3	17+5	3	0+1	0
Forwards
9	FW	(Republic of the Congo) CGO	Guy Mbenza	30	10	28+1	10	1	0
32	FW	(Saudi Arabia) KSA	Fahad Al-Johani	21	1	2+18	1	0+1	0
37	FW	(Saudi Arabia) KSA	Nawaf Jaber	0	0	0	0	0	0
99	FW	(Saudi Arabia) KSA	Hazaa Al-Hazaa	7	0	0+7	0	0	0

=== Goalscorers ===
Rank	No.	Pos	Nat	Name	Pro League	King Cup	Total
1	9	FW	(Republic of the Congo)	Guy Mbenza	10	0	10
1	10	MF	(Algeria)	Amir Sayoud	10	0	10
3	11	MF	(Zimbabwe)	Knowledge Musona	8	1	9
4	8	MF	(Brazil)	Dener	3	0	3
4	75	MF	(Saudi Arabia)	Mohammed Harzan	3	0	3
6	7	MF	(Saudi Arabia)	Mukhtar Ali	2	0	2
6	30	MF	(Guinea-Bissau)	Alfa Semedo	2	0	2
8	18	MF	(Saudi Arabia)	Mohammed Al-Qunaian	1	0	1
8	32	FW	(Saudi Arabia)	Fahad Al-Johani	1	0	1
Own goal					1	1	2
Total					41	2	43

Last Updated: 27 May 2023

=== Assists ===
Rank	No.	Pos	Nat	Name	Pro League	King Cup	Total
1	11	MF	(Zimbabwe)	Knowledge Musona	9	0	9
2	10	MF	(Algeria)	Amir Sayoud	6	0	6
3	40	DF	(Cameroon)	Collins Fai	5	0	5
4	9	FW	(Republic of the Congo)	Guy Mbenza	4	0	4
5	23	DF	(Saudi Arabia)	Nawaf Al-Qumairi	3	0	3
6	12	DF	(Saudi Arabia)	Hussain Qassem	2	0	2
7	30	MF	(Guinea-Bissau)	Alfa Semedo	0	1	1
7	32	FW	(Saudi Arabia)	Fahad Al-Johani	1	0	1
Total					30	1	31

Last Updated: 22 May 2023

=== Clean sheets ===
Rank	No.	Pos	Nat	Name	Pro League	King Cup	Total
1	1	GK	(Brazil)	Victor Braga	7	0	7
Total					7	0	7

Last Updated: 27 April 2023
