= 2022–23 Saudi Pro League =

Saudi Pro League
- Season: 2022–2023
- Dates: 25 August 2022 – 31 May 2023
- Champions: Al-Ittihad (9th title)
- Relegated: Al-Adalah; Al-Batin
- AFC Champions League: Al-Ittihad; Al-Hilal; Al-Fayha; Al-Nassr
- FIFA Club World Cup: Al-Ittihad
- Matches: 240
- Goals: 648 (2.7 per match)
- Top goalscorer: Abderrazak Hamdallah (21 goals)
- Biggest home win: Al-Ittihad 5–0 Al-Adalah (10 February 2023); Al-Raed 5–0 Damac (15 May 2023)
- Biggest away win: Al-Batin 0–5 Al-Fateh (8 September 2022); Al-Adalah 0–5 Al-Nassr (5 April 2023)
- Highest scoring: Al-Raed 2–4 Al-Fayha (14 January 2023); Al-Batin 2–4 Al-Shabab (9 February 2023); Al-Wehda 3–3 Al-Hilal (2 March 2023); Al-Fateh 1–5 Al-Ittihad (18 March 2023); Al-Fateh 2–4 Al-Adalah (15 May 2023)
- Longest winning run: Al-Ittihad; Al-Shabab; Al-Taawoun (6 matches)
- Longest unbeaten run: Al-Nassr (17 matches)
- Longest winless run: Al-Batin (17 matches)
- Longest losing run: Al-Khaleej (6 matches)
- Highest attendance: 59,892; Al-Ittihad 2–0 Al-Tai (31 May 2023)
- Lowest attendance: 284; Al-Wehda 0–1 Al-Fayha (31 May 2023)
- Total attendance: 2,241,254
- Average attendance: 9,339

The 2022–23 Saudi Pro League (known as the Roshn Saudi League for sponsorship reasons) was the 48th edition of the top-tier Saudi football league, established in 1974, and the 15th edition since it was rebranded as the Saudi Pro League in 2008, Fixtures for the first half of the 2022–23 season were announced on 4 August 2022.

Al-Hilal were the three-time defending champions after winning their recording extending 18th title last season. Al-Adalah, Al-Khaleej, and Al-Wehda join as the three promoted clubs from the 2021–22 Yelo League. They replaced Al-Ahli, Al-Faisaly, and Al-Hazem who were relegated to the 2022–23 Yelo League. The winner will play in the 2023 FIFA Club World Cup in Saudi Arabia as the host club.

On 27 May, Al-Ittihad secured their ninth league title, with one game to spare, following a 3–0 away win against Al-Fayha. Al-Batin were the first team to be relegated following a 1–0 defeat away to Al-Ittihad on 23 May. Al-Adalah were the second and final club to be relegated following a 2–0 home defeat to Al-Ettifaq on the final matchday.

== Overview ==
=== Changes ===
On 14 April 2022, the Saudi FF announced that the number of teams in the Pro League 2023–24 season would be increased from 16 to 18 teams. To prepare for this change, only 2 teams would be relegated to the First Division League and 4 teams would be promoted to the Pro League.

=== Name sponsorship ===
On 23 August 2022, the Saudi Pro League (SPL) announced that they had signed a sponsorship deal with real estate company Roshn. As part of the sponsorship deal, the Saudi Pro League would be known as the Roshn Saudi League (RSL) for the next 5 seasons.

== Teams ==
Locations of teams in the 2022–23 Saudi Professional League

16 teams are competing in the league – the top 13 teams from the previous season and the 3 teams promoted from the FD League.

Teams who were promoted to the Pro League

All 3 teams were promoted on the final day of the season. Al-Khaleej were promoted and crowned champions following a 0–0 away draw with Najran. Al-Khaleej return to the top flight for the first time since getting relegated in the 2016–17 season. Al-Khaleej will play in their 8th season in the top flight.

Al-Adalah were promoted following a 0–0 draw away to Jeddah. Al-Adalah return to the top flight after an absence of two seasons. Al-Adalah will play in their 2nd season in the top flight.

Al-Wehda were promoted following a 3–0 away win against Al-Diriyah. Al-Wehda will play in the top flight of Saudi football after a season's absence. Al-Wehda will play in their 38th season in the top flight.

Teams who were relegated to the FD League

Al-Hazem were the first team to be relegated following a 5–2 defeat away to Al-Ettifaq on 21 May. Al-Hazem were relegated after just one year in the top flight. This was their second relegation in three years.

Both Al-Ahli and Al-Faisaly were relegated following on the final day of the season. Al-Ahli were relegated for the first time in their history following a 0–0 away draw with Al-Shabab. They have previously competed in every edition of the Saudi Pro League since its inception in 1976–77. This is the first edition of the Pro League in which Al-Ahli will not be featured.

Al-Faisaly were relegated following a 2–1 away defeat to Al-Hilal. Al-Faisaly were relegated after 12 consecutive seasons in the top flight.

=== Stadiums ===
Note: Table lists in alphabetical order.

Team	Location	Stadium	Capacity
Abha	Abha	Prince Sultan bin Abdul Aziz Stadium	20,000
Al-Adalah	Al-Hasa (Al-Hulaylah)	Prince Abdullah bin Jalawi Stadium	26,000
Al-Batin	Hafar al-Batin	Al-Batin Club Stadium	6,000
Al-Ettifaq	Dammam	Prince Mohamed bin Fahd Stadium	35,000
Al-Fateh	Al-Hasa (Hofuf)	Prince Abdullah bin Jalawi Stadium	26,000
Al-Fayha	Al Majma'ah	Al Majma'ah Sports City	7,000
Al-Hilal	Riyadh	King Fahd International Stadium; Prince Faisal bin Fahd Stadium	62,685; 22,500
Al-Ittihad	Jeddah	King Abdullah Sports City	62,345
Al-Khaleej	Saihat	Prince Mohamed bin Fahd Stadium (Dammam)	35,000
Al-Nassr	Riyadh	Al-Awwal Park	25,000
Al-Raed	Buraidah	King Abdullah Sport City Stadium	25,000
Al-Shabab	Riyadh	Prince Faisal bin Fahd Stadium	22,500
Al-Taawoun	Buraidah	King Abdullah Sport City Stadium; Al-Taawoun Club Stadium	25,000; 5,961
Al-Tai	Ha'il	Prince Abdul Aziz bin Musa'ed Stadium	12,000
Al-Wehda	Mecca	King Abdul Aziz Stadium	38,000
Damac	Khamis Mushait	Prince Sultan bin Abdul Aziz Stadium (Abha); Damac Club Stadium	20,000; 4,500

=== Personnel and kits ===
Team	Manager	Captain	Kit manufacturer	Shirt sponsor
Abha	(Netherlands) Roel Coumans	(Saudi Arabia) Abdullah Al-Zori	Offside	Hayat National Hospital, Tameeni, Yelo, Mezaj Maghribi^{1}
Al-Adalah	(Slovakia) Martin Ševela	(Saudi Arabia) Abdullah Al-Yousef	–	Tameeni, Yelo, Alnadeg^{1}
Al-Batin	(Croatia) Zdravko Logarušić	(Uruguay) Martín Campaña	Zeus	Tameeni, Almaali Hospital^{2}
Al-Ettifaq	(Spain) Antonio Cazorla (caretaker)	(Saudi Arabia) Mohammed Al-Kuwaykibi	Offside	Alomar Furniture, Kammelna, Sky Ways, Tameeni, Saudi German Hospital^{1}, Shgardi^{2}, Tarmeem^{3}
Al-Fateh	(Greece) Georgios Donis	(Saudi Arabia) Mohammed Al-Fuhaid	Offside	Al-Jabr Finance, Fuschia, Tameeni, Al Kifah Holding^{1}, Almoosa Hospital^{1}
Al-Fayha	(Serbia) Vuk Rašović	(Saudi Arabia) Sami Al-Khaibari	Offside	Al-Romaih Investment, Tameeni, Afaq Al Arabya^{1}
Al-Hilal	(Argentina) Emiliano Díaz	(Saudi Arabia) Salman Al-Faraj	Puma	BLU Store, Jahez, Tawuniya^{1}, Floward^{2}, Shawarmer^{2}
Al-Ittihad	(Portugal) Nuno Espírito Santo	(Brazil) Marcelo Grohe	Nike	Darco, SAL, Emkan^{1}, Tameeni^{2}, Yelo^{2}, Oud Al-Amoudi^{3}
Al-Khaleej	(Portugal) Pedro Emanuel	(Saudi Arabia) Abdullah Al-Harbi	Laser	Tameeni, Yelo, Locate^{1}
Al-Nassr	(Portugal) Luís Castro (interim)	(Portugal) Cristiano Ronaldo	Nike	KAFD, Noug, Aroya Cruises^{2}
Al-Raed	(Romania) Marius Șumudică	(Saudi Arabia) Sultan Al-Farhan	Challenge	Alomar Furniture, Azom, Alsaif Gallery^{1}, Shawarma King^{1}, Tahaluf Capital^{1}, B-Care^{2}, Qaid^{2}
Al-Shabab	(Spain) Vicente Moreno	(Argentina) Éver Banega	Offside	Almozaini, Half Million, Mekyal^{1}, Azom^{2}, Bandar Real Estate^{2}
Al-Taawoun	(Brazil) Péricles Chamusca	(Brazil) Naldo	Skillano	Mu4hela Cafe, Tameeni, Alnadeg^{1}, Hayat National Hospital^{1}, Alsaif Gallery^{2}
Al-Tai	(Portugal) José Pedro Barreto	(Saudi Arabia) Abdulaziz Al-Harabi	RightAway Sport	Mashar, Tameeni, Abar^{1}, Qaid^{2}
Al-Wehda	(Chile) José Luis Sierra	(Saudi Arabia) Waleed Bakshween	Erreà	FG Sports, Tameeni, Yelo, Al Tazaj^{1}, Vveyon^{1}, Qaid^{2}
Damac	(Romania) Cosmin Contra	(Algeria) Farouk Chafaï	Skillano	Bin Thaliba^{1}, Mustasharak Hospital^{1}, Qaid^{2}, Lateen^{2}

- ^{1} On the back of the strip.
- ^{2} On the right sleeve of the strip.
- ^{3} On the shorts.

=== Managerial changes ===
Team	Outgoing manager	Manner of departure	Date of vacancy	Position in table	Incoming manager	Date of appointment
Al-Khaleej	(Saudi Arabia) Khaled Al-Marzouq	End of caretaker period	1 June 2022	Pre-season	(Portugal) Pedro Emanuel	3 July 2022
Al-Wehda	(Tunisia) Habib Ben Romdhane	End of contract	1 June 2022	Pre-season	(Bosnia and Herzegovina) Bruno Akrapović	14 June 2022
Abha	(Slovakia) Martin Ševela	End of contract	28 June 2022	Pre-season	(Belgium) Sven Vandenbroeck	16 July 2022
Al-Ittihad	(Romania) Cosmin Contra	End of contract	28 June 2022	Pre-season	(Portugal) Nuno Espírito Santo	4 July 2022
Al-Nassr	(Argentina) Miguel Ángel Russo	End of contract	28 June 2022	Pre-season	(France) Rudi Garcia	28 June 2022
Al-Raed	(Saudi Arabia) Yousef Al-Ghadeer	End of contract	28 June 2022	Pre-season	(Romania) Marius Șumudică	30 June 2022
Al-Shabab	(Romania) Marius Șumudică	End of contract	28 June 2022	Pre-season	(Spain) Vicente Moreno	28 July 2022
Al-Tai	(Chile) José Luis Sierra	End of contract	28 June 2022	Pre-season	(Portugal) Pepa	19 July 2022
Al-Taawoun	(Saudi Arabia) Mohammed Al-Abdali	End of caretaker period	28 June 2022	Pre-season	(Brazil) Péricles Chamusca	29 June 2022
Abha	(Belgium) Sven Vandenbroeck	Sacked	8 October 2022	14th	(Netherlands) Roel Coumans	30 October 2022
Al-Wehda	(Bosnia and Herzegovina) Bruno Akrapović	Mutual consent	20 October 2022	12th	(Chile) José Luis Sierra	20 October 2022
Al-Adalah	(Tunisia) Yousef Al Mannai	Sacked	22 October 2022	13th	(Slovakia) Martin Ševela	23 October 2022
Al-Tai	(Portugal) Pepa	Sacked	22 January 2023	9th	(Romania) Mirel Rădoi	22 January 2023
Al-Batin	(Croatia) Alen Horvat	Sacked	19 February 2023	16th	(Croatia) Zdravko Logarušić	19 February 2023
Al-Ettifaq	(France) Patrice Carteron	Mutual consent	26 February 2023	12th	(Spain) Antonio Cazorla (caretaker)	26 February 2023
Damac	(Croatia) Krešimir Režić	Sacked	6 March 2023	9th	(Romania) Cosmin Contra	6 March 2023
Al-Nassr	(France) Rudi Garcia	Mutual consent	13 April 2023	2nd	(Croatia) Dinko Jeličić (caretaker)	13 April 2023
Al-Hilal	(Argentina) Ramón Díaz	Resigned	14 May 2023	4th	(Argentina) Emiliano Díaz (caretaker)	14 May 2023
Al-Tai	(Romania) Mirel Rădoi	Sacked	18 May 2023	7th	(Portugal) José Pedro Barreto (caretaker)	18 May 2023

=== Foreign players ===
The number of foreign players was increased from 7 to 8. Clubs can register a total of eight foreign players over the course of the season, but only seven could be named in the matchday squad.

- Players name in **bold** indicates the player is registered during the mid-season transfer window.
- Players in italics were out of the squad or left the club within the season, after the pre-season transfer window, or in the mid-season transfer window, and at least had one appearance.

Club	Player 1	Player 2	Player 3	Player 4	Player 5	Player 6	Player 7	Player 8	Former Players
Abha	(Algeria) Tayeb Meziani	(Cameroon) Devis Epassy	(Ecuador) Felipe Caicedo	(Iraq) Saad Natiq	(Morocco) Amine Atouchi	(Netherlands) **Dries Saddiki**	(Serbia) Uroš Matić	(Tunisia) Saad Bguir	(Republic of the Congo) Prestige Mboungou (Mozambique) Luís Miquissone
Al-Adalah	(Brazil) Edson	(Colombia) Reinaldo Lenis	(Montenegro) Milan Mijatović	(Peru) Christofer Gonzáles	(Portugal) **Pedro Eugénio**	(Slovakia) **Boris Godál**	(Slovenia) **David Tijanić**	(Sweden) **Marcus Antonsson**	(Argentina) Lautaro Palacios (Colombia) Anderson Plata (Guinea) Mikael Dyrestam (Switzerland) Martin Angha
Al-Batin	(Brazil) Maurício Antônio	(Colombia) **Sebastián Pedroza**	(Colombia) **Andrés Felipe Roa**	(Democratic Republic of the Congo) **André Bukia**	(France) **Thibault Peyre**	(Ghana) **Salifu Mudasiru**	(Uruguay) Martín Campaña	(Uruguay) **Renzo López**	
Al-Ettifaq	(Brazil) Paulo Victor	(Brazil) Vitinho	(Democratic Republic of the Congo) Marcel Tisserand	(France) Youssoufou Niakaté	(North Macedonia) Darko Velkovski	(Sweden) Robin Quaison	(Tunisia) Naïm Sliti	(Turkey) Berat Özdemir	
Al-Fateh	(Algeria) Sofiane Bendebka	(Brazil) Petros	(France) **Tristan Dingomé**	(Morocco) Mourad Batna	(Morocco) Marwane Saâdane	(Sweden) Jacob Rinne	(Spain) **Cristian Tello**	(Spain) Fran Vélez	(Peru) Alex Valera (Peru) Christian Cueva
Al-Fayha	(Brazil) Paulinho	(Brazil) Ricardo Ryller	(Spain) Víctor Ruiz	(Nigeria) Anthony Nwakaeme	(North Macedonia) Aleksandar Trajkovski	(Serbia) Milan Pavkov	(Serbia) Vladimir Stojković		(Greece) Panagiotis Tachtsidis
Al-Hilal	(Argentina) Luciano Vietto	(Brazil) Michael	(Colombia) Gustavo Cuéllar	(Mali) Moussa Marega	(Nigeria) Odion Ighalo	(Peru) André Carrillo	(South Korea) Jang Hyun-soo		(Brazil) Matheus Pereira
Al-Ittihad	(Angola) Hélder Costa	(Brazil) Igor Coronado	(Brazil) Marcelo Grohe	(Brazil) Bruno Henrique	(Brazil) Romarinho	(Egypt) Tarek Hamed	(Egypt) Ahmed Hegazi	(Morocco) Abderrazak Hamdallah	
Al-Khaleej	(Albania) Sokol Cikalleshi	(Brazil) Douglas Friedrich	(Brazil) Morato	(Brazil) Lucas Souza	(Gabon) André Biyogo Poko	(Nigeria) Izuchuckwu Anthony	(Portugal) **Pedro Amaral**	(Portugal) **Fábio Martins**	(Algeria) Djamel Benlamri (Colombia) Brayan Riascos
Al-Nassr	(Argentina) Pity Martínez	(Argentina) **Agustín Rossi**	(Brazil) Luiz Gustavo	(Brazil) Talisca	(Uzbekistan) Jaloliddin Masharipov	(Ivory Coast) Ghislain Konan	(Portugal) **Cristiano Ronaldo**	(Spain) Álvaro González	(Cameroon) Vincent Aboubakar (Colombia) David Ospina
Al-Raed	(Brazil) Pablo Santos	(Cape Verde) Júlio Tavares	(Croatia) Damjan Đoković	(Morocco) Karim El Berkaoui	(Morocco) Mohamed Fouzair	(Romania) Silviu Lung Jr.	(Romania) Alexandru Mitriță		(Brazil) René Santos
Al-Shabab	(Argentina) Éver Banega	(Argentina) Cristian Guanca	(Brazil) Carlos	(Brazil) Iago Santos	(Gabon) Aaron Boupendza	(Poland) Grzegorz Krychowiak	(South Korea) Kim Seung-gyu	(Spain) Santi Mina	
Al-Taawoun	(Brazil) Flávio	(Brazil) Mailson	(Brazil) Naldo	(Cameroon) Léandre Tawamba	(Netherlands) Aschraf El Mahdioui	(Paraguay) Kaku	(Spain) Álvaro Medrán		
Al-Tai	(Algeria) Amir Sayoud	(Brazil) Victor Braga	(Brazil) Dener	(Cameroon) Collins Fai	(Republic of the Congo) Guy Mbenza	(Guinea-Bissau) Alfa Semedo	(Venezuela) Adrián Martínez	(Zimbabwe) Knowledge Musona	
Al-Wehda	(Brazil) Anselmo	(Costa Rica) Óscar Duarte	(France) Jean-David Beauguel	(France) Karim Yoda	(Luxembourg) Gerson Rodrigues	(Morocco) Fayçal Fajr	(Morocco) Munir Mohamedi	(Spain) Alberto Botía	
Damac	(Algeria) Abdelkader Bedrane	(Algeria) Farouk Chafaï	(Algeria) Hillal Soudani	(Algeria) Moustapha Zeghba	(Brazil) Bruno Duarte	(Croatia) Domagoj Antolić	(Netherlands) Adam Maher	(Spain) Nono	

== League table ==
Pos	Team	Pld	W	D	L	GF	GA	GD	Pts	Qualification or relegation
1	Al-Ittihad (C, Q)	30	22	6	2	60	13	+47	72	Qualified for the AFC Champions League group stage and the 2023 FIFA Club World Cup
2	Al-Nassr	30	20	7	3	63	18	+45	67	Qualified for the AFC Champions League play-off round
3	Al-Hilal (Note: Al-Hilal qualified for the AFC Champions League group stage as the 2022–23 King Cup winners.)	30	17	8	5	54	29	+25	59	Qualified for the AFC Champions League group stage
4	Al-Shabab	30	17	5	8	57	33	+24	56	
5	Al-Taawoun	30	16	7	7	46	34	+12	55	
6	Al-Fateh	30	13	4	13	48	43	+5	43	
7	Al-Ettifaq	30	10	7	13	28	36	−8	37	
8	Damac	30	9	9	12	33	43	−10	36	
9	Al-Tai	30	10	4	16	41	49	−8	34 (Note: Al-Tai finished ahead of Al-Raed on head-to-head points: Al-Tai: 4 pts, Al-Raed: 1 pts (Al-Raed 0–2 Al-Tai, Al-Tai 2–2 Al-Raed).)	
10	Al-Raed	30	9	7	14	41	49	−8	34	
11	Al-Fayha (Note: Al-Fayha qualified for the AFC Champions League group stage as the 2021–22 King Cup winners.)	30	8	9	13	31	43	−12	33 (Note: Al-Fayha finished ahead of Abha on head-to-head points: Al-Fayha: 4 pts, Abha: 1 pts (Abha 1–1 Al-Fayha, Al-Fayha 2–0 Abha).)	Qualified for the AFC Champions League group stage
12	Abha	30	10	3	17	33	52	−19	33	
13	Al-Wehda	30	8	8	14	26	43	−17	32	
14	Al-Khaleej	30	9	4	17	30	44	−14	31	
15	Al-Adalah (R)	30	7	7	16	30	56	−26	28	Relegated to the First Division League
16	Al-Batin (R)	30	5	5	20	27	63	−36	20	Relegated to the First Division League

Updated to match(es) played on 31 May 2023. Source: SPL
Rules for classification: 1) Points; 2) Head-to-head points; 3) Head-to-head goal difference; 4) Total goal difference; 5) Total goals scored; 6) Fair-play points (Note: Head-to-head record is used only after all the matches between the teams in question have been played).
(C) Champions; (Q) Qualified for the phase indicated; (R) Relegated

=== Positions by round ===
The following table lists the positions of teams after each week of matches. In order to preserve the chronological evolution, any postponed matches are not included in the round at which they were originally scheduled but added to the full round they were played immediately afterward.

Team ╲ Round	1	2	3	4	5	6	7	8	9	10	11	12	13	14	15	16	17	18	19	20	21	22	23	24	25	26	27	28	29	30
Al-Ittihad	1	6	3	3	3	2	3	3	5	3	3	4	3	3	3	2	2	2	2	1	1	1	1	1	1	1	1	1	1	1
Al-Nassr	7	9	6	4	5	4	2	2	1	1	1	1	1	1	1	1	1	1	1	2	2	2	2	2	2	2	2	2	2	2
Al-Hilal	3	2	2	2	2	5	5	4	3	4	5	3	2	2	4	4	4	4	5	4	4	4	4	4	4	4	4	4	3	3
Al-Shabab	2	1	1	1	1	1	1	1	2	2	2	2	4	4	2	3	3	3	3	3	3	3	3	3	3	3	3	3	4	4
Al-Taawoun	4	3	4	6	4	3	6	5	4	5	4	5	5	5	5	5	5	5	4	5	5	5	6	6	5	5	5	5	5	5
Al-Fateh	13	7	9	11	9	9	9	8	9	8	9	10	7	8	6	6	6	6	6	6	6	6	5	5	6	6	6	6	6	6
Al-Ettifaq	10	11	8	9	10	10	8	10	10	10	10	8	10	10	9	10	11	12	10	10	11	12	12	8	9	8	8	10	10	7
Damac	8	4	5	7	6	7	7	6	6	6	6	6	8	6	8	7	7	7	9	7	7	7	7	9	8	9	11	7	7	8
Al-Tai	5	5	7	5	8	6	4	7	7	9	7	7	9	9	10	9	8	8	7	8	8	8	8	7	7	7	7	8	8	9
Al-Raed	9	8	10	8	7	8	10	11	11	11	11	11	11	11	12	12	10	10	12	9	9	9	10	11	11	11	10	9	9	10
Al-Fayha	11	14	13	13	14	15	15	15	13	13	12	13	12	13	11	11	12	11	8	11	10	10	11	12	12	12	12	12	13	11
Abha	6	10	12	10	13	14	12	9	8	7	8	9	6	7	7	8	9	9	11	12	12	11	9	10	10	10	9	11	11	12
Al-Wehda	12	12	11	12	12	12	11	12	12	12	13	12	13	12	13	13	14	13	13	13	13	13	13	13	13	13	13	13	12	13
Al-Khaleej	14	13	14	14	11	13	14	14	15	14	15	15	14	14	14	14	13	14	14	14	14	14	15	15	14	14	14	14	14	14
Al-Adalah	16	15	15	15	15	11	13	13	14	15	14	14	15	15	15	15	15	15	15	15	15	15	14	14	15	15	15	15	15	15
Al-Batin	15	16	16	16	16	16	16	16	16	16	16	16	16	16	16	16	16	16	16	16	16	16	16	16	16	16	16	16	16	16

Leader, 2023 FIFA Club World Cup and AFC Champions League group stage
AFC Champions League play-offs
Relegation to FD League

Updated to match(es) played on 31 May 2023. Source: spl.sa

== Results ==
Home \ Away	ABH	ADA	BAT	ETT	FAT	FAY	HIL	ITT	KHJ	NSR	RAE	SHB	TWN	TAI	WHD	DAM
Abha		1–0	3–2	2–1	2–2	1–1	0–3	1–2	2–0	0–3	2–1	0–4	1–1	2–1	1–2	2–1
Al-Adalah	0–2		1–1	0–2	2–1	2–1	2–0	0–3	2–0	0–5	0–3	0–1	2–1	2–2	1–2	0–2
Al-Batin	1–3	2–2		1–0	0–5	0–0	1–0	1–2	1–0	0–4	1–2	2–4	0–1	4–3	2–0	2–2
Al-Ettifaq	2–1	3–2	3–0		0–4	1–0	0–0	0–3	1–0	1–1	1–2	1–0	0–1	1–2	1–1	2–0
Al-Fateh	3–0	2–4	2–0	2–0		0–2	0–1	1–5	2–0	2–2	1–0	4–1	0–2	2–3	1–1	1–1
Al-Fayha	2–0	1–1	2–2	0–3	3–0		0–2	0–3	0–3	0–0	1–1	1–2	1–1	2–1	2–0	0–1
Al-Hilal	2–1	2–0	3–1	3–0	1–2	2–0		2–2	2–0	2–0	3–2	1–1	1–2	2–2	3–0	2–2
Al-Ittihad	4–0	5–0	1–0	0–0	3–1	3–0	0–1		2–0	1–0	0–0	2–1	3–0	2–0	1–0	3–0
Al-Khaleej	3–1	0–0	1–0	2–1	1–2	1–2	0–2	0–3		0–1	3–0	2–3	0–2	2–2	3–2	2–0
Al-Nassr	2–1	4–1	3–1	1–0	3–0	4–0	2–2	0–0	1–1		4–0	3–2	2–1	2–0	1–0	2–1
Al-Raed	3–1	2–1	3–1	1–2	0–3	2–4	1–1	0–1	0–0	1–4		2–2	2–3	0–2	1–0	5–0
Al-Shabab	2–0	1–2	3–0	3–0	1–0	3–2	3–0	1–1	4–0	0–0	1–0		0–3	4–0	0–1	2–1
Al-Taawoun	1–3	4–1	3–1	1–1	1–2	1–1	0–4	2–1	0–1	1–0	2–1	1–1		2–1	2–0	1–1
Al-Tai	1–0	1–0	4–0	2–0	1–0	2–1	2–3	0–1	3–0	0–2	2–2	1–2	1–3		1–2	1–3
Al-Wehda	1–0	0–0	2–0	1–1	0–2	0–1	3–3	1–2	1–4	0–4	2–2	2–1	1–1	1–0		0–2
Damac	1–0	2–2	1–0	0–0	3–1	1–1	0–1	1–1	2–1	0–3	1–2	1–4	1–2	2–0	0–0	

Updated to match(es) played on 31 May 2023. Source: goalzz.com
Legend: Blue = home team win; Yellow = draw; Red = away team win.
For upcoming matches, an "a" indicates there is an article about the rivalry between the two participants.

== Season statistics ==
As of 31 May 2023

=== Scoring ===
==== Top goalscorers ====
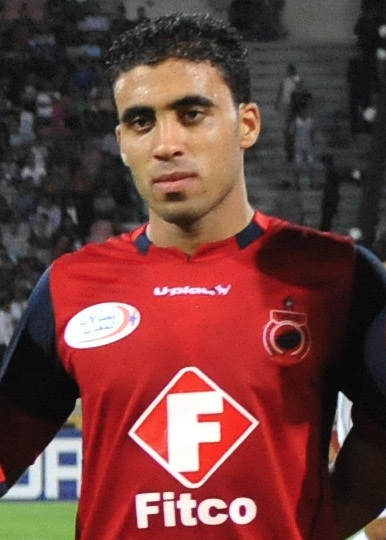
Al-Ittihad's Abderrazak Hamdallah was the season's top scorer, with 21 goals.

Rank	Player	Club	Goals
1	(Morocco) Abderrazak Hamdallah	Al-Ittihad	21
2	(Brazil) Talisca	Al-Nassr	20
3	(Nigeria) Odion Ighalo	Al-Hilal	19
4	(Saudi Arabia) Firas Al-Buraikan	Al-Fateh	17
5	(Portugal) Cristiano Ronaldo	Al-Nassr	14
6	(Argentina) Cristian Guanca	Al-Shabab	13
6	(Brazil) Romarinho	Al-Ittihad	13
8	(Brazil) Carlos	Al-Shabab	12
9	(Morocco) Mohamed Fouzair	Al-Raed	11
9	(Gabon) Aaron Boupendza	Al-Shabab	11

==== Hat-tricks ====
Player	For	Against	Result	Date	Ref.
(Zimbabwe) Knowledge Musona	Al-Tai	Al-Khaleej	3–0 (H)	6 October 2022	
(Brazil) Talisca	Al-Nassr	Al-Raed	4–1 (A)	16 December 2022	
(Portugal) Cristiano Ronaldo^{4}	Al-Nassr	Al-Wehda	4–0 (A)	9 February 2023	
(Portugal) Cristiano Ronaldo	Al-Nassr	Damac	3–0 (A)	25 February 2023	
(Morocco) Abderrazak Hamdallah	Al-Ittihad	Al-Fateh	5–1 (A)	18 March 2023	
(Morocco) Karim El Berkaoui	Al-Raed	Al-Batin	3–1 (H)	2 May 2023	
(Morocco) Mohamed Fouzair	Al-Raed	Damac	5–0 (H)	15 May 2023	
(Gabon) Aaron Boupendza^{4}	Al-Shabab	Damac	4–1 (A)	31 May 2023	

Note

(H) – Home; (A) – Away
^{4} Player scored 4 goals

=== Clean sheets ===
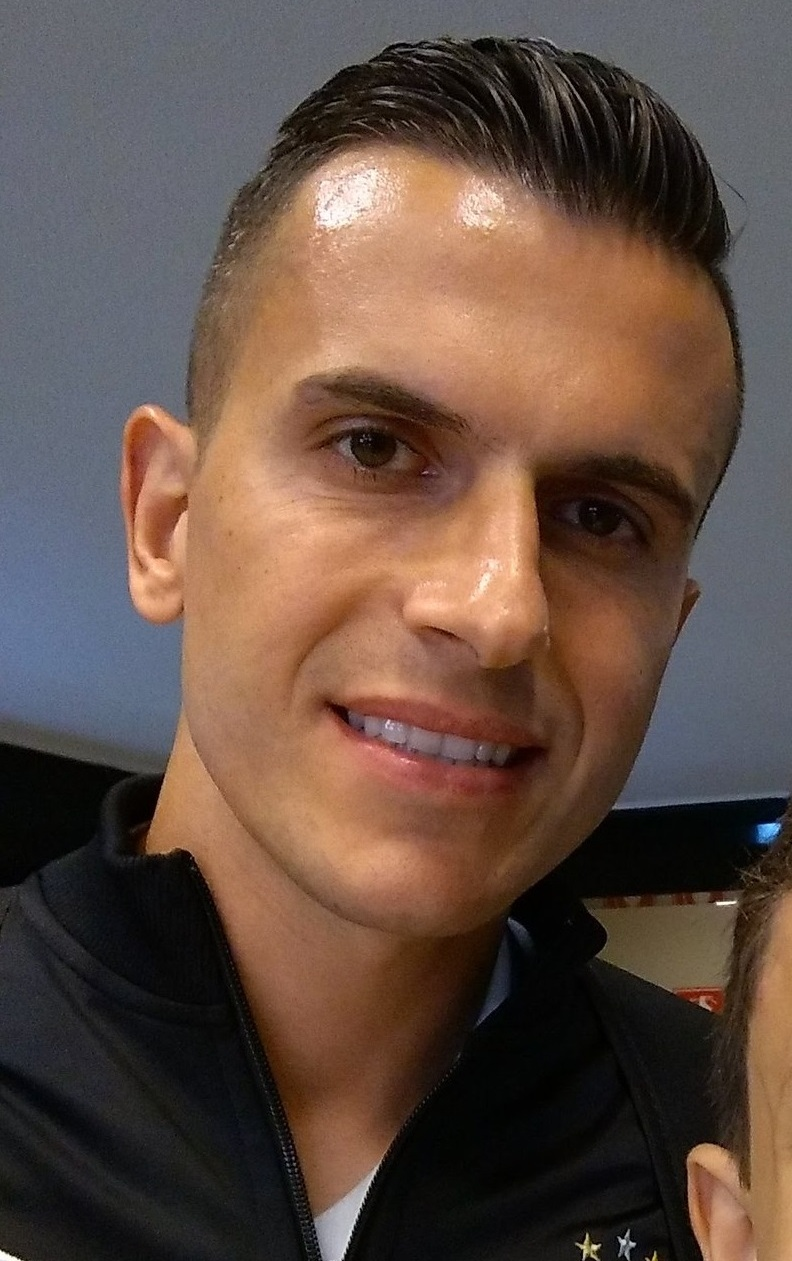
Al-Ittihad's Marcelo Grohe kept 19 clean sheets in the season, a record for a Saudi Professional League season.

Rank	Player	Club	Clean sheets
1	(Brazil) Marcelo Grohe	Al-Ittihad	19
2	(Saudi Arabia) Abdullah Al-Mayouf	Al-Hilal	12
3	(South Korea) Kim Seung-gyu	Al-Shabab	11
4	(Brazil) Paulo Victor	Al-Ettifaq	10
5	(Colombia) David Ospina	Al-Nassr	8
5	(Sweden) Jacob Rinne	Al-Fateh	8
5	(Algeria) Moustapha Zeghba	Damac	8
8	(Brazil) Victor Braga	Al-Tai	7
8	(Serbia) Vladimir Stojković	Al-Fayha	7
10	(Saudi Arabia) Nawaf Al-Aqidi	Al-Nassr	6
10	(Brazil) Mailson	Al-Taawoun	6

=== Discipline ===
==== Player ====
- Most yellow cards: 9
  - (Saudi Arabia) Bassam Al-Hurayji (Al-Batin)
- Most red cards: 2
  - (Saudi Arabia) Fahad Al-Harbi (Al-Adalah)
  - (Saudi Arabia) Sanousi Hawsawi (Al-Ettifaq)

==== Club ====
- Most yellow cards: 69
  - Al-Batin
- Most red cards: 5
  - Al-Adalah
  - Al-Taawoun

== Attendances ==
=== By round ===
2022–23 Professional League Attendance
Round	Total	GP.	Avg. Per Game
Round 1	68,851	8	8,606
Round 2	81,053	8	10,132
Round 3	61,568	8	7,696
Round 4	69,264	8	8,658
Round 5	46,341	8	5,793
Round 6	87,515	8	10,939
Round 7	53,182	8	6,648
Round 8	97,330	8	12,166
Round 9	31,208	8	3,901
Round 10	74,917	8	9,365
Round 11	63,815	8	7,977
Round 12	83,926	8	10,491
Round 13	39,356	8	4,920
Round 14	76,291	8	9,536
Round 15	58,047	8	7,256
Round 16	108,962	8	13,620
Round 17	73,027	8	9,128
Round 18	87,064	8	10,883
Round 19	95,271	8	11,909
Round 20	105,196	8	13,150
Round 21	54,975	8	6,872
Round 22	87,747	8	10,968
Round 23	50,441	8	6,305
Round 24	95,356	8	11,920
Round 25	56,457	8	7,057
Round 26	108,922	8	13,615
Round 27	49,987	8	6,248
Round 28	110,428	8	13,804
Round 29	58,492	8	7,312
Round 30	106,265	8	13,283
Total	2,241,254	240	9,339

=== By team ===
Pos	Team	Total	High	Low	Average	Change
1	Al-Ittihad	606,796	59,892	19,694	40,453	+21.5%
2	Al-Nassr	264,567	23,248	11,721	17,638	+110.5%
3	Al-Adalah	193,681	18,025	7,392	12,912	n/a †
4	Al-Fateh	161,785	17,631	2,929	10,786	+35.2%
5	Al-Hilal	143,110	24,674	3,714	9,541	−26.0%
6	Al-Taawoun	109,642	19,478	2,767	7,310	+40.2%
7	Al-Tai	109,317	9,632	5,584	7,288	+37.1%
8	Al-Wehda	100,673	28,678	284	6,712	n/a †
9	Al-Raed	89,607	19,942	1,423	5,974	−0.6%
10	Al-Khaleej	84,574	15,355	1,000	5,638	n/a †
11	Al-Ettifaq	83,421	17,183	1,225	5,561	−17.1%
12	Al-Shabab	68,867	9,379	767	4,591	−18.7%
13	Damac	62,082	13,434	311	4,139	−2.5%
14	Al-Fayha	57,905	6,291	2,068	3,860	−20.1%
15	Abha	53,953	13,422	386	3,597	+25.2%
16	Al-Batin	51,274	4,096	3,182	3,418	+13.4%
	League total	2,241,254	59,892	284	9,339	+11.8%

Updated to games played on 31 May 2023
Notes:
^{†} Teams played previous season in FD League.

== Awards ==
=== Monthly awards ===
Month	Manager of the Month		Player of the Month		Goalkeeper of the Month		Rising Star of the Month		Reference
Month	Manager	Club	Player	Club	Player	Club	Player	Club	Reference
August & September	(Spain) Vicente Moreno	Al-Shabab	(Argentina) Cristian Guanca	Al-Shabab	(Saudi Arabia) Abdullah Al-Mayouf	Al-Hilal	(Saudi Arabia) Nawaf Al-Qumairi	Al-Tai	
October	(Spain) Vicente Moreno	Al-Shabab	(Brazil) Luiz Gustavo	Al-Nassr	(Colombia) David Ospina	Al-Nassr	(Saudi Arabia) Firas Al-Buraikan	Al-Fateh	
December	(Serbia) Vuk Rašović	Al-Fayha	(Paraguay) Kaku	Al-Taawoun	(Algeria) Moustapha Zeghba	Damac	(Saudi Arabia) Nawaf Al-Sadi	Abha	
January	(Portugal) Pedro Emanuel	Al-Khaleej	(Saudi Arabia) Salem Al-Dawsari	Al-Hilal	(Brazil) Douglas Friedrich	Al-Khaleej	(Saudi Arabia) Moteb Al-Harbi	Al-Shabab	
February	(Spain) Vicente Moreno	Al-Shabab	(Portugal) Cristiano Ronaldo	Al-Nassr	(Brazil) Marcelo Grohe	Al-Ittihad	(Saudi Arabia) Nawaf Al-Sadi	Abha	
March	(Portugal) Nuno Espírito Santo	Al-Ittihad	(Brazil) Igor Coronado	Al-Ittihad	(Brazil) Marcelo Grohe	Al-Ittihad	(Saudi Arabia) Saad Al Mousa	Al-Ettifaq	
April	(Portugal) Nuno Espírito Santo	Al-Ittihad	(Morocco) Mourad Batna	Al-Fateh	(Saudi Arabia) Nawaf Al-Aqidi	Al-Nassr	(Saudi Arabia) Firas Al-Buraikan	Al-Fateh	
May	(Brazil) Péricles Chamusca	Al-Taawoun	(Brazil) Morato	Al-Khaleej	(Brazil) Marcelo Grohe	Al-Ittihad	(Saudi Arabia) Firas Al-Buraikan	Al-Fateh	

=== Annual awards ===
Annual awards
Award	Winner	Club
Golden Boot	(Morocco) Abderrazak Hamdallah	Al-Ittihad
Most Assists	(Paraguay) Kaku	Al-Taawoun
Most Clean Sheets	(Brazil) Marcelo Grohe	Al-Ittihad
Manager of the Season	(Portugal) Nuno Espírito Santo	Al-Ittihad

=== Team of the Season ===
Team of the Season
Goalkeeper	(Brazil) Marcelo Grohe (Al-Ittihad)			
Defenders	(Saudi Arabia) Madallah Al-Olayan (Al-Ittihad)	(Egypt) Ahmed Hegazi (Al-Ittihad)	(Saudi Arabia) Ahmed Sharahili (Al-Ittihad)	(Ivory Coast) Ghislain Konan (Al-Nassr)
Midfielders	(Brazil) Romarinho (Al-Ittihad)		(Brazil) Luiz Gustavo (Al-Nassr)	(Paraguay) Kaku (Al-Taawoun)
Forwards	(Morocco) Mourad Batna (Al-Fateh)		(Nigeria) Odion Ighalo (Al-Hilal)	(Saudi Arabia) Firas Al-Buraikan (Al-Fateh)
