= 2025–26 Al-Najma SC season =

Al-Najma
2025–26 season
- President: Ahmed Al-Tamimi
- Manager: Mário Silva
- Stadium: King Abdullah Sports City
- Pro League: Pre-season
- King Cup: Round of 32
- All statistics correct as of 1 July 2025.

The 2025–26 season is Al-Najma's 66th year in their existence and the first season back in the top flight of Saudi Arabian football after earning promotion in the previous season. The club will participate in the Pro League and the King's Cup.

This is Al-Najma's first season in the top flight of Saudi football since the 2002–03 season.

The season covers the period from 1 July 2025 to 30 June 2026.

== Players ==
=== Squad information ===
As of 1 July 2025

Note: Flags indicate national team as defined under FIFA eligibility rules; some limited exceptions apply. Players may hold more than one non-FIFA nationality.

No.	Pos.	Nation	Player
6	MF	KSA	Khaled Eid
9	FW	NED	Sylla Sow
10	MF	KSA	Faisal Al-Mutairi
14	MF	KSA	Abdullah Al-Saghir
17	MF	KSA	Mohammed Al-Fraidi
18	MF	KSA	Abdulaziz Al-Harabi
20	MF	KSA	Nawaf Al-Rashwodi
22	GK	KSA	Khaled Al-Muqaitib
26	MF	FRA	Bilel Aouacheria
33	DF	KSA	Riyadh Al-Asmari
34	GK	KSA	Azzam Al-Hussain
77	FW	KSA	Abdullah Khattab

No.	Pos.	Nation	Player
90	FW	KSA	Omar Al-Ruwaili
93	GK	BRA	Max Walef
—	DF	KSA	Nasser Al-Hulayel
—	DF	KSA	Abdullah Hawsawi
—	DF	KSA	Fahad Al-Abdulrazzaq
—	DF	KSA	Mohammed Al-Kunaydiri
—	MF	KSA	Abdulwahed Al-Nakhli
—	MF	KSA	Ammar Al-Najjar
—	MF	KSA	Mohammed Mansour
—	MF	SVN	David Tijanić
—	FW	HON	Romell Quioto

== Transfers and loans ==
=== Transfers in ===
Entry date	Position	No.	Player	From club	Fee	Ref.
3 August 2025	MF	17	(Saudi Arabia) Mohammed Mansour	(Saudi Arabia) Al-Arabi	Free	
3 August 2025	MF	43	(Slovenia) David Tijanić	(Turkey) Göztepe	Free	
3 August 2025	MF	55	(Saudi Arabia) Abdulwahed Al-Nakhli	(Saudi Arabia) Al-Jandal	Free	
3 August 2025	FW	9	(Honduras) Romell Quioto	(Saudi Arabia) Al-Arabi	Free	
4 August 2025	DF	4	(Saudi Arabia) Nasser Al-Haleel	(Saudi Arabia) Al-Jubail	Free	
4 August 2025	DF	12	(Saudi Arabia) Mohammed Al-Kunaydiri	(Saudi Arabia) Al-Tai	Free	
4 August 2025	DF	19	(Saudi Arabia) Fahad Al-Abdulrazzaq	(Saudi Arabia) Al-Taawoun	Free	
4 August 2025	DF	24	(Saudi Arabia) Abdullah Hawsawi	(Saudi Arabia) Al-Kholood	Free	
4 August 2025	MF	15	(Saudi Arabia) Ammar Al-Najjar	(Saudi Arabia) Jeddah	Free	
12 August 2025	GK	87	(Saudi Arabia) Waleed Al-Enezi	(Saudi Arabia) Al-Fateh	Free	
13 August 2025	DF	3	(Brazil) Samir	(Mexico) Tigres	$6,000,000	
17 August 2025	DF	5	(Morocco) Jawad El Yamiq	(Saudi Arabia) Al-Wehda	Free	
19 August 2025	MF	8	(Saudi Arabia) Abdulelah Al-Shammeri	(Saudi Arabia) Abha	Free	
20 August 2025	MF	20	(Honduras) Deiby Flores	(Canada) Toronto	Undisclosed	
27 August 2025	FW	98	(France) Bilal Boutobba	(Turkey) Hatayspor	$1,400,000	
10 September 2025	GK	1	(Brazil) Victor Braga	(Cyprus) AEL Limassol	$200,000	
10 September 2025	FW	7	(Brazil) Lázaro	(Spain) Almería	$5,850,000	

=== Loans in ===
Start date	End date	Position	No.	Player	From club	Fee	Ref.
29 August 2025	End of season	DF	50	(Saudi Arabia) Nawaf Hawsawi	(Saudi Arabia) Al-Riyadh	None	
29 August 2025	End of season	FW	14	(Iraq) Ali Jasim	(Italy) Como	None	
10 September 2025	End of season	FW	77	(Saudi Arabia) Hisham Al Dubais	(Saudi Arabia) Al-Shabab	None	
26 January 2026	End of season	DF	27	(Saudi Arabia) Khalid Al-Subaie	(Saudi Arabia) Al-Hazem	None	

=== Transfers out ===
Exit date	Position	No.	Player	To club	Fee	Ref.
30 June 2025	DF	47	(Saudi Arabia) Abdulrahman Al-Obaid	(Saudi Arabia) Al-Ittihad	End of loan	
30 June 2025	MF	15	(Saudi Arabia) Nasser Al-Bishi	(Saudi Arabia) Al-Riyadh	End of loan	
30 June 2025	MF	19	(Saudi Arabia) Sultan Al-Akouz	(Saudi Arabia) Al-Wehda	End of loan	
30 June 2025	MF	29	(Saudi Arabia) Fahad Al-Taleb	(Saudi Arabia) Al-Nassr	End of loan	
1 July 2025	DF	2	(Saudi Arabia) Osama Al-Bawardi	(Saudi Arabia) Al-Riyadh	Free	
1 July 2025	MF	11	(Saudi Arabia) Rayan Al-Mutairi	(Saudi Arabia) Al-Fayha	Free	
1 July 2025	MF	23	(Brazil) Léo Tilica	(United Arab Emirates) Dibba Al-Hisn	Free	
23 July 2025	MF	8	(Saudi Arabia) Ziyad Al-Qahtani	(Saudi Arabia) Al-Diriyah	Free	
2 August 2025	DF	3	(Saudi Arabia) Munif Doshy	(Saudi Arabia) Al-Faisaly	Free	
1 September 2025	DF	53	(Iraq) Ali Adnan	(Saudi Arabia) Al-Wehda	Free	
10 September 2025	DF	33	(Saudi Arabia) Riyadh Al-Asmari	(Saudi Arabia) Al-Jubail	Free	
10 September 2025	MF	20	(Saudi Arabia) Nawaf Al-Rashwodi	(Saudi Arabia) Al-Jubail	Free	
10 September 2025	FW	9	(Netherlands) Sylla Sow	(Saudi Arabia) Abha	Free	
11 September 2025	MF	50	(Saudi Arabia) Riyadh Al-Ibrahim	(Saudi Arabia) Al-Adalah	Free	
21 September 2025	FW	77	(Saudi Arabia) Abdullah Khattab	(Saudi Arabia) Al-Washm	Free	
21 January 2026	MF	10	(Saudi Arabia) Faisal Al-Mutairi	(Saudi Arabia) Al-Diriyah	Undisclosed	
21 January 2026	FW	9	(Honduras) Romell Quioto	(Saudi Arabia) Al-Faisaly	Free	

=== Loans out ===
Start date	End date	Position	No.	Player	To club	Fee	Ref.
9 September 2025	End of season	MF	17	(Saudi Arabia) Mohammed Al-Fraidi	(Saudi Arabia) Tuwaiq	None	
21 January 2026	End of season	MF	15	(Saudi Arabia) Ammar Al-Najjar	(Saudi Arabia) Al-Wehda	None	

== Pre-season ==
30 July 2025 Friendly	Al-Najma (Saudi Arabia)	2–0	(Qatar) Al-Markhiya	İzmit, Turkey
18:00 TRT	Al-Harabi; Sow	Report		Stadium: Sporterio Arena

6 August 2025 Friendly	Al-Najma (Saudi Arabia)	1–1	(Saudi Arabia) Al-Okhdood	Sapanca, Turkey
18:00 TRT	Sow 53'	Report	Petros 36'	Stadium: Sapanca Ataturk Stadyumu

11 August 2025 Friendly	Al-Najma (Saudi Arabia)	1–1	(Saudi Arabia) Al-Hazem	Derince, Turkey
17:30 TRT	Al-Nakhli			Stadium: Derince Suni Çim Stadı

15 August 2025 Friendly	Al-Najma (Saudi Arabia)	1–1	(Saudi Arabia) Al-Orobah	Sapanca, Turkey
17:00 TRT	Al-Haleel		Al-Shammari	Stadium: Sapanca Ataturk Stadyumu

21 August 2025 Friendly	Al-Najma (Saudi Arabia)	1–1	(Saudi Arabia) Al-Hazem	Ar Rass, Saudi Arabia
19:30 AST	Quioto			Stadium: Al-Hazem Club Stadium

== Competitions ==
=== Overview ===
Competition	Record							
Competition	Pld	W	D	L	GF	GA	GD	Win %
Pro League	18	0	5	13	18	37	−19	0.00
King's Cup	2	1	0	1	2	2	+0	50.00
Total	20	1	5	14	20	39	−19	5.00

Updated to match played 28 January 2026
Source: Competitions

=== Pro League ===
==== League table ====
Pos	Team	Pld	W	D	L	GF	GA	GD	Pts	Qualification or relegation
14	Al-Kholood	34	9	6	19	39	61	−22	33	
15	Al-Riyadh	34	7	9	18	35	63	−28	30	
16	Damac (R)	34	6	11	17	32	55	−23	29	Relegation to FD League
17	Al-Okhdood (R)	34	5	5	24	27	70	−43	20	Relegation to FD League
18	Al-Najma (R)	34	3	7	24	32	76	−44	16	Relegation to FD League

Source: SPL
Rules for classification: 1) Points; 2) Head-to-head points; 3) Head-to-head goal difference; 4) Total goal difference; 5) Total goals scored; 6) Fair-play points
(Note: Head-to-head record is used only after all the matches between the teams in question have been played).
(R) Relegated

==== Results summary ====
Overall								Home						Away					
Pld	W	D	L	GF	GA	GD	Pts	W	D	L	GF	GA	GD	W	D	L	GF	GA	GD
18	0	5	13	18	37	−19	5	0	3	6	11	19	−8	0	2	7	7	18	−11

Last updated: 28 January 2026.
Source: Saudi Pro League

==== Results by round ====
Round	1	2	3	4	5	6	7	8	9	11	12	13	14	15	16	17	18	19	20	21	22	23	10	24	25	26	27	28	29	30	31	32	33	34
Ground	A	A	H	H	A	H	A	H	A	A	A	H	H	A	H	A	H	H	A	A	H	A	H	H	A	H	A	H	H	A	A	H	A	H
Result	L	L	L	L	L	L	L	L	D	L	L	D	L	L	D	D	L	D																
Position	14	16	17	17	18	18	18	18	18	18	18	18	18	18	18	18	18	18																

Updated to match(es) played on 30 January 2026. Source: Saudi Pro League
A = Away; H = Home; W = Win; D = Draw; L = Loss

==== Matches ====
All times are local, AST (UTC+3).

Win Draw Loss Postponed

30 August 2025 1	Al-Qadsiah	3–1	Al-Najma	Dammam
21:00	Retegui 5', 90+5'; Quiñones 45'	Report	Jasim 54'; Al-Kunaydiri (yellow card) 88'; Flores (yellow card) 90'	Stadium: Prince Mohamed bin Fahd Stadium; Attendance: 3,692; Referee: Kirill Levnikov (Russia)

14 September 2025 2	Al-Riyadh	2–1	Al-Najma	Riyadh
18:35	Tozé 1'; Sylla 19'; Zidan (yellow card) 83'; Bayesh (yellow card) 86' (yellow-red card) 90+2'	Report	K. Al-Shammari (yellow card) 37'; Lázaro 51'; A. Al-Shammeri (yellow card) 55'; Al-Abdulrazzaq (yellow card) 72'	Stadium: Al-Shabab Club Stadium; Attendance: 1,151; Referee: Mohammed Al-Ismail

20 September 2025 3	Al-Najma	0–1	Al-Ittihad	Buraidah
18:40	Al-Shammeri (yellow card) 53'	Report	Mitaj (yellow card) 29'; Aouar (yellow card) 60'; Al-Mousa (yellow card) 73'; Bergwijn (yellow card) 86'; Kanté 90+6'	Stadium: King Abdullah Sports City; Attendance: 2,659; Referee: Mohammed Al-Hoaish

27 September 2025 4	Al-Najma	1–2	Al-Fayha	Buraidah
18:35	A. Al-Shammeri (yellow card) 43'; El Yamiq (yellow card) 71'; Samir 90+2'	Report	Al-Mutairi (yellow card) 45+5'; Semedo 75'; Bamsaud (yellow card) 81'; Ganvoula 88'	Stadium: King Abdullah Sports City; Attendance: 844; Referee: Ali Al-Qahtani

17 October 2025 5	Al-Kholood	5–1	Al-Najma	Buraidah
18:10	Sawaan 4'; Enrique 24' (pen.); N'Doram (yellow card) 43'; Maolida 45+1'; Bahebri 84'; Al-Aliwa 90'	Report	Jasim 11'; Samir (yellow card) 45+3' (yellow-red card) 67'; Al-Harabi (yellow card) 47'; Al-Tulayhi (yellow card) 56'; K. Al-Shammari (yellow card) 63'; Al-Najjar (yellow card) 90+2'	Stadium: King Abdullah Sports City; Attendance: 2,759; Referee: Shukri Al-Hanfoush

23 October 2025 6	Al-Najma	0–1	Al-Ahli	Buraidah
21:00	Jasim (yellow card) 38'; A. Hawsawi (yellow card) 85'; Flores (yellow card) 90'	Report	Hamed (yellow card) 30'; Al-Buraikan 34'; Millot (yellow card) 43'; Atangana (yellow card) 84'	Stadium: King Abdullah Sports City; Attendance: 2,473; Referee: Clément Turpin (France)

31 October 2025 7	Al-Okhdood	2–1	Al-Najma	Najran
16:40	Al-Rubaie 19', 80', (yellow card) 90+3'; Kramer (yellow card) 67'	Report	Petros 53' (o.g.); Lázaro (yellow card) 54'	Stadium: Prince Hathloul bin Abdulaziz Sports City; Attendance: 1,242; Referee: Ahmed Al-Rumaikhani

7 November 2025 8	Al-Najma	2–4	Al-Hilal	Buraidah
20:30	Lázaro 3', (red card) 58'; Neves 60' (o.g.); Braga (yellow card) 73'; El Yamiq (red card) 76'	Report	S. Al-Dawsari 10', 90'; Akçiçek (yellow card) 52'; Hernández (yellow card) 67', (goal) 71'; Neves 78'; César (yellow card) 90+6'	Stadium: King Abdullah Sports City; Attendance: 12,641; Referee: Alejandro Muñiz Ruiz (Spain)

22 November 2025 9	Damac	0–0	Al-Najma	Khamis Mushait
16:40	Méïté (yellow card) 53'; Al-Qahtani (yellow card) 60'; Harkass (yellow card) 71'; Alioui (yellow card) 90+2'; Al-Anazi (yellow card) 90+7'	Report	Flores (yellow card) 74'	Stadium: Damac Club Stadium; Attendance: 624; Referee: Fraih Al-Jaloud

25 December 2025 11	Neom	2–1	Al-Najma	Tabuk
20:30	Abdi (yellow card) 51'; Zézé 54'; Al-Dawsari 89'	Report	Al-Tulayhi (yellow card) 11'; Flores (yellow card) 77'; Boutobba 90+5' (pen.); K. Al-Shammari (yellow card) 90+6'	Stadium: King Khalid Sport City Stadium; Attendance: 965; Referee: Majed Al-Shamrani

29 December 2025 12	Al-Taawoun	1–0	Al-Najma	Buraidah
20:30	Al-Kuwaykibi (yellow card) 40'; Martínez (yellow card) 60', (goal) 85'; El Mahdioui (yellow card) 74'	Report		Stadium: Al-Taawoun Club Stadium; Attendance: 4,294; Referee: Ali Al-Qahtani

2 January 2026 13	Al-Najma	2–2	Al-Khaleej	Buraidah
16:30	Lázaro 50'; Samir 90+6'	Report	Al-Hafith (yellow card) 39'; Masouras 72'; King 74'; Hamzi (yellow card) 84'; Moris (yellow card) 85'; Kanabah (red card) 90+3'	Stadium: King Abdullah Sports City; Attendance: 370; Referee: Fraih Al-Jaloud

8 January 2026 14	Al-Najma	3–4	Al-Ettifaq	Buraidah
20:30	Al-Tulayhi 72'; Jasim 73'; Lázaro 87'	Report	Al-Haleel 27' (o.g.); Dembélé 39', (yellow card) 45+4'; Calvo 42', 59'; Al-Ghannam (yellow card) 78'	Stadium: King Abdullah Sports City; Attendance: 231; Referee: Abdullah Al-Kharboush

12 January 2026 15	Al-Hazem	3–2	Al-Najma	Ar Rass
18:10	Tunkar (yellow card) 42'; Boutouil (yellow card) 47'; Sayoud 58', 90+6', (yellow card) 81'; Al-Shammari 90+8', (yellow card) 90+8'	Report	Tijanić 8'; Al-Haleel (yellow card) 26'; Al-Tulayhi 43'	Stadium: Al-Hazem Club Stadium; Attendance: 1,024; Referee: Majed Al-Shamrani

16 January 2026 16	Al-Najma	1–1	Al-Fateh	Buraidah
16:40	Al-Haleel (yellow card) 21'; Jasim 75'	Report	Al-Anazi 12'	Stadium: King Abdullah Sports City; Attendance: 1,684; Referee: Ali Al-Qahtani

20 January 2026 17	Al-Shabab	0–0	Al-Najma	Riyadh
18:05		Report	Al-Haleel (yellow card) 43'; Boutobba (yellow card) 64'; A. Hawsawi (yellow card) 89'	Stadium: SHG Arena; Attendance: 2,802; Referee: Fraih Al-Jaloud

25 January 2026 18	Al-Najma	1–3	Al-Qadsiah	Buraidah
18:20	N. Hawsawi (yellow card) 11'; Al-Tulayhi 57'	Report	Flores 7' (o.g.); Quiñones 62'; Retegui 73'	Stadium: King Abdullah Sports City; Attendance: 3,107; Referee: Radu Petrescu (Romania)

28 January 2026 19	Al-Najma	1–1	Al-Riyadh	Buraidah
18:20	A. Hawsawi (yellow card) 38'; Tijanić 51'	Report	Haroun 20'	Stadium: King Abdullah Sports City; Attendance: 933; Referee: Sultan Al-Harbi

21 December 2025 10	Al-Najma	v	Al-Nassr	Buraidah
20:30				Stadium: King Abdullah Sports City

=== King's Cup ===
All times are local, AST (UTC+3).

23 September 2025 Round of 32	Al-Najma	2–1	Damac	Buraidah
18:35	K. Al-Shammari (yellow card) 23'; A. Al-Shammeri (yellow card) 56'; Lázaro 58'; Al-Kunaydiri (yellow card) 65'; Al Dubais (yellow card) 90+1'; Al-Harabi 90+3'	Report	Harkass (yellow card) 5'; Al-Anazi (yellow card) 22'; H. Al-Ghamdi 79'; Kaiki (yellow card) 81'	Stadium: King Abdullah Sports City; Referee: Mohammed Al-Dagash

27 October 2025 Round of 16	Al-Kholood	1–0 (a.e.t.)	Al-Najma	Buraidah
18:00	Buckley (yellow card) 32'; Enrique 99'; Al-Safri (yellow card) 109'; Cozzani (yellow card) 115'	Report	Al-Abdulrazzaq (yellow card) 45'; Al-Haleel (yellow card) 75'; Quioto (yellow card) 82'; Flores (yellow card) 82'	Stadium: King Abdullah Sports City; Referee: Mohammed Al-Ismail

== Statistics ==
=== Appearances ===
Last updated on 28 January 2026.

No.	Pos	Nat	Player	Total		Pro League		King's Cup	
No.	Pos	Nat	Player	Apps	Goals	Apps	Goals	Apps	Goals
Goalkeepers
1	GK	(Brazil) BRA	Victor Braga	18	0	16	0	2	0
22	GK	(Saudi Arabia) KSA	Khaled Al-Muqaitib	0	0	0	0	0	0
87	GK	(Saudi Arabia) KSA	Waleed Al-Enezi	2	0	2	0	0	0
Defenders
2	DF	(Brazil) BRA	Vitor Vargas	14	0	13	0	1	0
3	DF	(Brazil) BRA	Samir	16	2	15	2	1	0
4	DF	(Saudi Arabia) KSA	Nasser Al-Haleel	14	0	11+2	0	1	0
5	DF	(Morocco) MAR	Jawad El Yamiq	7	0	6	0	1	0
6	DF	(Saudi Arabia) KSA	Khaled Al-Shammari	14	0	10+3	0	1	0
12	DF	(Saudi Arabia) KSA	Mohammed Al-Kunaydiri	5	0	3+1	0	1	0
19	DF	(Saudi Arabia) KSA	Fahad Al-Abdulrazzaq	13	0	8+3	0	2	0
24	DF	(Saudi Arabia) KSA	Abdullah Hawsawi	13	0	11+1	0	0+1	0
27	DF	(Saudi Arabia) KSA	Khalid Al-Subaie	1	0	0+1	0	0	0
50	DF	(Saudi Arabia) KSA	Nawaf Hawsawi	7	0	3+4	0	0	0
Midfielders
8	MF	(Saudi Arabia) KSA	Abdulelah Al-Shammeri	19	0	12+5	0	2	0
17	MF	(Saudi Arabia) KSA	Mohammed Mansour	0	0	0	0	0	0
18	MF	(Saudi Arabia) KSA	Abdulaziz Al-Harabi	11	1	2+7	0	1+1	1
20	MF	(Honduras) HON	Deiby Flores	18	0	16	0	2	0
23	MF	(Saudi Arabia) KSA	Rakan Al-Tulayhi	19	3	9+9	3	1	0
43	MF	(Slovenia) SVN	David Tijanić	11	2	11	2	0	0
44	MF	(Croatia) CRO	Marin Prekodravac	2	0	0+1	0	0+1	0
55	MF	(Saudi Arabia) KSA	Abdulwahed Al-Nakhli	1	0	0+1	0	0	0
Forwards
7	FW	(Brazil) BRA	Lázaro	16	5	13+1	4	2	1
14	FW	(Iraq) IRQ	Ali Jasim	20	4	13+5	4	1+1	0
77	FW	(Saudi Arabia) KSA	Hisham Al Dubais	12	0	1+10	0	0+1	0
98	FW	(France) FRA	Bilal Boutobba	19	1	16+1	1	0+2	0
Players sent out on loan this season
15	MF	(Saudi Arabia) KSA	Ammar Al-Najjar	4	0	0+3	0	0+1	0
Player who made an appearance this season but have left the club
9	FW	(Honduras) HON	Romell Quioto	10	0	7+2	0	1	0
10	MF	(Saudi Arabia) KSA	Faisal Al-Mutairi	11	0	0+9	0	2	0

=== Goalscorers ===
Rank	No.	Pos	Nat	Name	Pro League	King's Cup	Total
1	7	FW	(Brazil)	Lázaro	4	1	5
2	14	FW	(Iraq)	Ali Jasim	4	0	4
3	23	MF	(Saudi Arabia)	Rakan Al-Tulayhi	3	0	3
4	3	DF	(Brazil)	Samir	2	0	2
4	43	MF	(Slovenia)	David Tijanić	2	0	2
6	18	MF	(Saudi Arabia)	Abdulaziz Al-Harabi	0	1	1
6	98	FW	(France)	Bilal Boutobba	1	0	1
Own goal					2	0	2
Total					18	2	20

Last Updated: 28 January 2026

=== Assists ===
Rank	No.	Pos	Nat	Name	Pro League	King's Cup	Total
1	23	MF	(Saudi Arabia)	Rakan Al-Tulayhi	3	0	3
2	3	DF	(Brazil)	Samir	1	0	1
2	8	MF	(Saudi Arabia)	Abdulelah Al-Shammeri	0	1	1
2	12	DF	(Saudi Arabia)	Mohammed Al-Kunaydiri	1	0	1
2	18	MF	(Saudi Arabia)	Abdulaziz Al-Harabi	1	0	1
2	43	MF	(Slovenia)	David Tijanić	1	0	1
2	98	FW	(France)	Bilal Boutobba	1	0	1
Total					8	1	9

Last Updated: 25 January 2026

=== Clean sheets ===
Rank	No.	Pos	Nat	Name	Pro League	King's Cup	Total
1	1	GK	(Brazil)	Victor Braga	1	0	1
1	87	GK	(Saudi Arabia)	Waleed Al-Enezi	1	0	1
Total					2	0	2

Last Updated: 20 January 2026
