= Mukhtar Ali =

Saudi Arabian footballer (born 1997)

Personal information
- Full name: Mukhtar Abdullah Ali
- Date of birth: 30 October 1997 (age 29)
- Place of birth: Jeddah, Saudi Arabia
- Position: Midfielder

Team information
- Current team: Al-Ittihad
- Number: 8

Youth career
- –2008: Leyton Orient
- 2008–2017: Chelsea

Senior career*
Years	Team	Apps	(Gls)
2017	Chelsea	0	(0)
2017	→ Vitesse (loan)	6	(0)
2017	→ Jong Vitesse (loan)	4	(0)
2017–2019	Vitesse	9	(1)
2019–2025	Al-Nassr	33	(0)
2022	→ Al-Tai (loan)	11	(2)
2022–2023	→ Al-Tai (loan)	27	(2)
2023–2024	→ Al-Fateh (loan)	27	(0)
2025–2026	Al-Ettifaq	35	(1)
2026–	Al-Ittihad	9	(0)

International career^{‡}
2012	England U16	2	(0)
2013–2014	England U17	4	(0)
2017–2021	Saudi Arabia U23	1	(0)
2017–	Saudi Arabia	19	(0)
- * Club domestic league appearances and goals as of 30 October 2026 ‡ National team caps and goals as of 17 November 2026

Mukhtar Abdullah Ali (Arabic: مختار عبد الله علي; born 30 October 1997) is a Saudi Arabian professional footballer who plays as a midfielder for Al-Ittihad and the Saudi Arabia national team.

== Club career ==
=== Chelsea ===
In 2008, Ali joined Chelsea at under-11 level from Leyton Orient and progressed through the club's academy system. He was part of the Chelsea youth side which recorded back to back triumphs in the FA Youth Cup in 2015 and 2016. With 42 appearances in all competitions he was the second-leading appearance maker in the academy and was also nominated for International Somali Sportsman of the Year.

=== Vitesse ===
On 29 January 2017, Ali joined Vitesse on loan for the remainder of the 2016–17 campaign. On 19 February 2017, Ali made his Vitesse debut in their 1–0 home defeat against Ajax, replacing Marvelous Nakamba in the 84th minute. On 4 February 2017, he played his first match for Jong Vitesse against SV Spakenburg. Ali went onto appear in five more league games during his loan spell.

On 17 July 2017, Vitesse permanently signed Ali on a three-year deal.

=== Al-Nassr ===
On 31 August 2019, Al-Nassr signed Mukhtar Ali on a one-year deal from Vitesse. On 29 January 2022, he renewed his contract with Al-Nassr until 2025 and was loaned out to Al-Tai. On 29 August 2022, Mukhtar Ali rejoined Al-Tai on a one-year loan. On 7 September 2023, Mukhtar Ali joined Al-Fateh on a one-year loan.

=== Al-Ettifaq ===
On 29 January 2025, Ali joined Al-Ettifaq on a four-and-a-half year deal.

== International career ==
Ali represented England at both under-16 and under-17 level and was also eligible to represent Somalia, the country of his parents. However, he pledged his allegiance to the Saudi Arabia national team, and made his senior debut on 7 October 2017 against Jamaica. This was possibly based on the player's assertion that he was instead born in Jeddah, Saudi Arabia.

== Career statistics ==
As of match played 27 May 2024.

Appearances and goals by club, season and competition
Club	Season	League			National cup (Note: Includes KNVB Cup, King Cup)		Continental		Other		Total	
Club	Season	Division	Apps	Goals	Apps	Goals	Apps	Goals	Apps	Goals	Apps	Goals
Vitesse (loan)	2016–17	Eredivisie	6	0	0	0	—		—		6	0
Vitesse	2017–18	Eredivisie	3	0	0	0	1 (Note: Appearance in UEFA Europa League)	0	2 (Note: Appearances in Eredivisie European play-offs)	0	6	0
Vitesse	2018–19	Eredivisie	6	1	1	0	0	0	—		7	1
Al-Nassr	2019–20	Saudi Pro League	20	0	1	0	8 (Note: Appearances in AFC Champions League)	1	—		29	1
Al-Nassr	2020–21	Saudi Pro League	5	0	1	0	2	0	—		8	0
Al-Nassr	2021–22	Saudi Pro League	0	0	0	0	1	0	—		1	0
Al-Nassr	2023–24	Saudi Pro League	3	0	0	0	1	0	0	0	4	0
Al-Nassr	Total		28	0	2	0	12	1	0	0	42	1
Al-Tai (loan)	2021–22	Saudi Pro League	11	2	0	0	—		—		11	2
Al-Tai (loan)	2022–23	Saudi Pro League	27	2	1	0	—		—		28	2
Al-Tai (loan)	Total		38	4	1	0	—		—		39	4
Al-Fateh (loan)	2023–24	Saudi Pro League	27	0	2	0	—		—		29	0
Career total			108	5	6	0	13	1	2	0	129	6

== Honours ==
=== Club ===
Chelsea Reserves

- FA Youth Cup: 2013–14, 2014–15, 2015–16
- UEFA Youth League: 2015–16

Vitesse

- KNVB Cup: 2016–17

Al-Nassr

- Saudi Super Cup: 2019, 2020
- Arab Club Champions Cup: 2023
