= Abdulelah Al-Shammeri =

Saudi Arabian footballer

Personal information
- Full name: Abdulelah Malwah Al-Shammeri
- Date of birth: 24 January 1999 (age 27)
- Place of birth: Riyadh, Saudi Arabia
- Height: 1.72 m (5 ft 8 in)
- Positions: Attacking midfielder; winger

Team information
- Current team: Al-Najma
- Number: 8

Youth career
- Al-Shabab

Senior career*
Years	Team	Apps	(Gls)
2018–2023	Al-Shabab	3	(0)
2020–2021	→ Al-Tai (loan)	33	(4)
2021–2022	→ Al-Hazem (loan)	16	(0)
2022–2023	→ Damac (loan)	21	(1)
2023–2025	Abha	48	(7)
2025–	Al-Najma	0	(0)

International career
2019–2020	Saudi Arabia U20		
2021–2022	Saudi Arabia U23		
- * Club domestic league appearances and goals as of 19 August 2023

Abdulelah Al-Shammeri (Arabic: عبدالإله الشمري, born 24 January 1999) is a Saudi Arabian professional footballer who plays as an attacking midfielder or winger for Saudi Pro League club Al-Najma.

He is the younger brother of Abdulmalek Al-Shammeri.

== Career ==
Al-Shammeri started his career at Al-Shabab and was first called up to the first team during the 2018–19 season. On 30 June 2019, Al-Shammeri was chosen in the Saudi program to develop football talents established by General Sports Authority in Saudi Arabia. On 13 October 2020, Al-Shammeri joined Al-Tai on loan for the 2020–21 season. He scored four times in 33 appearances as Al-Tai earned promotion to the Pro League. He returned to Al-Shabab following the conclusion of his loan and signed a three-year deal with the club on 21 July 2021. He made his debut for Al-Shabab on 12 August 2021 in the 2–1 defeat away to Abha. On 15 August 2021, Al-Shammeri joined Al-Hazem on loan. On 4 August 2022, Al-Shammeri joined Damac on a season-long loan. On 7 September 2023, Al-Shammeri joined Abha on a two-year deal. On 19 August 2025, Al-Shammeri joined Al-Najma on a free transfer.

== Career statistics ==
=== Club ===
As of match played 27 May 2025

Club	Season	League		King Cup		Asia		Other		Total	
Club	Season	Apps	Goals	Apps	Goals	Apps	Goals	Apps	Goals	Apps	Goals
Al-Shabab	2018–19	0	0	0	0	–		–		0	0
Al-Shabab	2019–20	0	0	0	0	–		0	0	0	0
Al-Shabab	2021–22	1	0	0	0	0	0	–		1	0
Al-Shabab	2023–24	2	0	0	0	–		3 (Note: Appearances in Arab Club Champions Cup)	0	5	0
Al-Shabab	Total	3	0	0	0	0	0	3	0	6	0
Al-Tai (loan)	2020–21	33	4	–		–		–		33	4
Al-Hazem (loan)	2021–22	16	0	0	0	–		–		16	0
Damac (loan)	2022–23	21	1	1	0	–		–		22	1
Abha	2023–24	21	0	3	0	–		–		24	0
Abha	2024–25	27	7	1	0	–		–		28	7
Abha	Total	48	7	4	0	0	0	0	0	52	7
Al-Najma	2025–26	0	0	0	0	–		–		0	0
Career total		121	12	5	0	0	0	3	0	129	12
