= Douglas Friedrich =

Brazilian footballer (born 1988)

Personal information
- Full name: Douglas Alan Schuck Friedrich
- Date of birth: 12 December 1988 (age 37)
- Place of birth: Candelária, Brazil
- Height: 1.94 m (6 ft 4 in)
- Position: Goalkeeper

Youth career
- 2007: ADAP/Galo Maringá

Senior career*
Years	Team	Apps	(Gls)
2007–2008	ADAP/Galo Maringá		
2009–2010	Sanat Naft		
2011–2015	Capivariano	47	(0)
2012	→ Ituano (loan)	3	(0)
2013–2014	→ Caxias (loan)	51	(0)
2015	→ Bragantino (loan)	33	(0)
2016–2017	Corinthians	0	(0)
2016	→ Grêmio (loan)	0	(0)
2017	→ Avaí (loan)	29	(0)
2018–2021	Bahia	110	(0)
2021	→ Juventude (loan)	17	(0)
2022	Avaí	11	(0)
2022–2023	Al-Khaleej	20	(0)
2023–2024	Avaí	1	(0)
2025–2026	Portimonense	2	(0)
- * Club domestic league appearances and goals as of 17 May 2026

Douglas Alan Schuck Friedrich (born 12 December 1988), known as Douglas Friedrich or simply Douglas, is a Brazilian professional footballer who plays as a goalkeeper.

== Career ==
=== Bahia ===
On 9 January 2018, Friedrich signed a contract until 2020 with Bahia as part of Juninho Capixaba's transfer to Corinthians.

=== Al-Khaleej ===
On 12 July 2022, Friedrich joined Saudi Arabian club Al-Khaleej.

=== Avaí ===
On 23 July 2023, Friedrich returned to Brazil and joined Avaí.

=== Portimonense ===
On 13 August 2025, Friedrich moved to Portimonense in Portugal on a one-season contract.

== Personal life ==
He is the older brother of Ricardo, also a goalkeeper.

== Career statistics ==
As of 7 February 2022.

Appearances and goals by club, season and competition
Club	Season	League			State League		Cup		Continental		Other		Total	
Club	Season	Division	Apps	Goals	Apps	Goals	Apps	Goals	Apps	Goals	Apps	Goals	Apps	Goals
Capivariano	2011	Paulista 2ª Divisão	—		33	0	—		—		—		33	0
Capivariano	2012	Paulista A3	—		0	0	—		—		—		0	0
Capivariano	2013	Paulista A2	—		0	0	—		—		—		0	0
Capivariano	2014	Paulista A2	—		0	0	—		—		—		0	0
Capivariano	2015	Paulista	—		14	0	3	0	—		—		17	0
Capivariano	Total		—		47	0	3	0	—		—		50	0
Ituano (loan)	2012	Paulista	—		3	0	—		—		17 (Note: Appearance(s) in Copa Paulista)	0	20	0
Caxias (loan)	2013	Série C	17	0	—		—		—		—		17	0
Caxias (loan)	2014	Série C	17	0	17	0	—		—		—		34	0
Caxias (loan)	Total		34	0	17	0	—		—		—		51	0
Bragantino (loan)	2015	Série B	33	0	—		—		—		—		33	0
Corinthians	2016	Série A	0	0	0	0	0	0	—		—		0	0
Grêmio (loan)	2016	Série A	0	0	0	0	0	0	0	0	—		0	0
Avaí (loan)	2017	Série A	28	0	1	0	0	0	—		1 (Note: Appearance(s) in Primeira Liga)	0	30	0
Bahia	2018	Série A	26	0	10	0	6	0	5 (Note: Appearance(s) in Copa Sudamericana)	0	7 (Note: Appearance(s) in Copa do Nordeste)	0	54	0
Bahia	2019	Série A	37	0	5	0	6	0	2	0	6	0	56	0
Bahia	2020	Série A	30	0	2	0	1	0	5	0	2	0	40	0
Bahia	2021	Série A	0	0	0	0	2	0	2	0	8	0	12	0
Bahia	Total		93	0	17	0	15	0	14	0	23	0	162	0
Juventude (loan)	2021	Série A	17	0	—		—		—		—		17	0
Avaí	2022	Série A	0	0	5	0	0	0	—		—		5	0
Career total			205	0	90	0	18	0	14	0	41	0	368	0

== Honours ==
Bahia

- Campeonato Baiano: 2018, 2019, 2020
- Copa do Nordeste: 2021

Individual

- Saudi Professional League Goalkeeper of the Month: January 2023
