= Nawaf Al-Qumairi =

Saudi Arabian footballer

Personal information
- Full name: Nawaf Al-Qumairi
- Date of birth: 10 June 2001 (age 25)
- Place of birth: Saudi Arabia
- Height: 1.71 m (5 ft 7 1/2 in)
- Position: Right-back

Team information
- Current team: Al-Tai
- Number: 23

Youth career
- Al-Shabab

Senior career*
Years	Team	Apps	(Gls)
2021–2022	Al-Shabab	0	(0)
2022–	Al-Tai	33	(0)
2024–2025	→ Al-Orobah (loan)	13	(0)

International career
2022–	Saudi Arabia U23		
Medal record
Men's football
Representing Saudi Arabia
Islamic Solidarity Games
Silver medal – second place	2021 Konya
- * Club domestic league appearances and goals as of 12 August 2023

Nawaf Al-Qumairi (Arabic: نَوَّاف الْقُمَيْرِيّ; born 10 June 2001) is a Saudi Arabian professional footballer who plays as a right-back for Al-Tai.

== Club career ==
Al-Qumairi started his career at the youth teams of Al-Shabab. On 9 November 2020, Al-Qumairi was chosen to be part of the scholarship program to develop football talents established by the General Sports Authority in Saudi Arabia. On 27 June 2022, Al-Qumairi joined Pro League side Al-Tai on a two-year contract. He made his debut on 26 August 2022 in the 2–1 win against Al-Ettifaq. In his first month at the club, Al-Qumairi made 4 appearances and assisted twice. For his impressive performances, Al-Qumairi was awarded the Young Player of the Month award. On 2 September 2024, Al-Qumairi joined Al-Orobah on a one-year loan.

== International career ==
Al-Qumairi earned his first call-up for the Saudi Arabia U23 national team during the 2021 Islamic Solidarity Games. He made 2 appearances throughout the competition as the Green Falcons finished in second place, earning a silver medal.

== Honours ==
Individual

- Saudi Professional League Rising Stars of the Month: August & September 2022
