= Emiliano Díaz =

Italian-born footballer (born 1983)

Personal information
- Full name: Emiliano Ramón Díaz
- Date of birth: 22 June 1983 (age 43)
- Place of birth: Naples, Italy
- Height: 5 ft 7 in (1.70 m)
- Position: Right midfielder

Youth career
- Monaco
- Yokohama F. Marinos
- 2001: Avellino
- 2001–2002: River Plate

Senior career*
Years	Team	Apps	(Gls)
2002–2003	River Plate	1	(0)
2003	Talleres	0	(0)
2004	Deportivo Colonia	4	(0)
2005	Oxford United	7	(0)
2005–2006	Defensores de Belgrano	2	(0)
2006–2007	Defensa y Justicia	1	(0)
2007	Platense	1	(0)
2007–2008	San Lorenzo	9	(0)
2008	Indios de Chihuahua		
2009–2010	All Boys	2	(0)
2011	Huracán de Tres Arroyos	1	(0)
Total		28	(0)

Managerial career
- 2011–2012: Independiente (assistant)
- 2012–2014: River Plate (assistant)
- 2014–2016: Paraguay (assistant)
- 2016–2018: Al-Hilal (assistant)
- 2018: Al-Ittihad (assistant)
- 2019: Pyramids (assistant)
- 2020: Libertad (assistant)
- 2020: Botafogo (assistant)
- 2020: Botafogo (interim)
- 2022–2023: Al Nasr (assistant)
- 2022–2023: Al-Hilal (assistant)
- 2023: Al-Hilal (interim)
- 2023–2024: Vasco da Gama (assistant)
- 2024–2025: Corinthians (assistant)
- * Club domestic league appearances and goals

Emiliano Ramón Díaz (born 22 June 1983) is a football coach and former player who played mainly as a right midfielder.

Born in Italy, Díaz holds Argentine citizenship. He is the son of Ramón Díaz, with whom he worked as an assistant in more than 10 teams.

== Playing career ==
Born in Naples when his father was representing Napoli, Díaz played for the youth sides of Monaco and Yokohama F. Marinos, and later also featured in two friendlies for Avellino, but never made an official appearance for the side. He then played for River Plate, making his first team – and Primera División – debut on 19 May 2002, coming on as a substitute for Eduardo Coudet in a 3–2 away win over Rosario Central, in a match which landmarked his father's departure from the club.

In 2003, after failing to play any further matches for River, Díaz joined Talleres de Córdoba, where he also did not appear. In 2004, he moved to Uruguayan side Deportivo Colonia, but soon reunited with his father after being signed up by Football League Two side Oxford United in January 2005.

Sometimes referred as "one of Oxford's worst ever players", Díaz played seven times for the club before departing when his father left on 4 May 2005. He later returned to his home country, playing rarely for Defensores de Belgrano and Primera B Nacional sides Defensa y Justicia and Platense.

In August 2007, Díaz and his brother were presented at San Lorenzo, months after his father's arrival at the club. After managing to feature in 10 matches, he moved to Mexico with Indios de Chihuahua, the reserve team of Indios de Ciudad Juárez, on 26 June 2008.

On 21 August 2009, Díaz was announced as an addition of All Boys. He retired in 2011, aged 29, after a short spell at Huracán de Tres Arroyos, and would later state that he "was not up" to clubs like River and San Lorenzo during his playing career.

== Coaching career ==
Shortly after retiring, Díaz joined his father's staff at Independiente, as his assistant. He continued to work in the same role at River Plate, the Paraguay national team, Al-Hilal, Al-Ittihad, Pyramids, Libertad and Botafogo; in the latter, he was an interim head coach during his father's entire spell, as he was recovering from a surgery. The duo departed the club on 27 November, with Emiliano coaching the side on three losses in as many matches.

Díaz would continue to work as an assistant of his father at Al Nasr and back at Al-Hilal, but remained at the latter after his father's resignation on 15 May 2023, being named interim manager. Late in that month, he also departed the side to return to Argentina.

Díaz then followed his father to Brazil, where he worked as an assistant at Vasco da Gama and Corinthians. After his departure from the latter, he stated a desire to take on a solo managerial career.

== Personal life ==
Díaz's father Ramón and younger brother Michael were also footballers. His father played as a forward and later went on to become a manager (with Emiliano working as his assistant), while his brother was a left-back but never played at professional level.

== Career statistics ==
Appearances and goals by club, season and competition
Club	Season	League			Cup		Continental		Other		Total	
Club	Season	Division	Apps	Goals	Apps	Goals	Apps	Goals	Apps	Goals	Apps	Goals
River Plate	2001–02	Argentine Primera División	1	0	—		—		—		1	0
River Plate	2002–03	Argentine Primera División	0	0	—		—		—		0	0
River Plate	Subtotal		1	0	—		—		—		1	0
Talleres	2003–04	Argentine Primera División	0	0	—		—		—		0	0
Deportivo Colonia	2004	Uruguayan Primera División	4	0	—		—		—		4	0
Oxford United	2004–05	Football League Two	7	0	—		—		—		7	0
Defensores de Belgrano	2005–06	Primera B Metropolitana	2	0	—		—		—		2	0
Defensa y Justicia	2006–07	Primera B Nacional	1	0	—		—		—		1	0
Platense	2006–07	Primera B Nacional	1	0	—		—		—		1	0
San Lorenzo	2007–08	Argentine Primera División	9	0	0	0	1 (Note: Appearance(s) in Copa Sudamericana)	0	—		10	0
All Boys	2009–10	Primera B Nacional	2	0	—		—		—		2	0
Huracán de Tres Arroyos	2010–11	Torneo Argentino A	1	0	1	0	—		—		2	0
Career total			28	0	1	0	1	0	0	0	30	0

== Managerial statistics ==
As of 20 April 2025

Managerial record by team and tenure
Team	Nat.	From	To	Record								Ref
Team	Nat.	From	To	G	W	D	L	GF	GA	GD	Win %	Ref
Botafogo (interim) (Note: Interim head coach as Ramón Díaz was recovering from a surgery)	(Brazil)	9 November 2020	27 November 2020	3	0	0	3	3	6	−3	0.00	
Al-Hilal (interim)	(Saudi Arabia)	13 May 2023	31 May 2023	5	3	1	1	9	6	+3	60.00	
Career total				8	3	1	4	12	12	+0	37.50	—
