= Abdulaziz Al-Harabi =

Saudi Arabian footballer

Personal information
- Full name: Abdulaziz Abdulrahman Abdulaziz Al-Harabi
- Date of birth: May 28, 1997 (age 29)
- Place of birth: Saudi Arabia
- Height: 1.76 m (5 ft 9 in)
- Position: Midfielder

Team information
- Current team: Al-Najma
- Number: 18

Youth career
- Al-Tai

Senior career*
Years	Team	Apps	(Gls)
2016–2024	Al-Tai	134	(12)
2024–	Al-Najma		
- * Club domestic league appearances and goals as of 12 August 2023

Abdulaziz Al-Harabi (Arabic: عبدالعزيز الحرابي; born 28 May 1997) is a Saudi Arabian professional footballer who plays as a midfielder for Al-Najma.

== Club career ==
Al-Harabi started his career at Al-Tai and made his first-team debut on 23 April 2016 in the final league match of the 2015–16 season against Al-Ettifaq. In the 2016–17 season, Al-Harabi made 8 appearances and made 0 appearances in the 2017–18 season. On 12 July 2019, Al-Harabi renewed his contract with Al-Tai. On 20 August 2019, he scored his first league goal for Al-Tai in the 2–1 win against Al-Bukiryah. During the 2020–21 season, Al-Harabi made 34 appearances and scored 3 goals and captained Al-Tai to promotion to the Pro League.

On 19 July 2024, Al-Harabi joined Al-Najma.

== Career statistics ==
=== Club ===
As of match played 31 May 2024

Club	Season	League			King Cup		Asia		Other		Total	
Club	Season	Division	Apps	Goals	Apps	Goals	Apps	Goals	Apps	Goals	Apps	Goals
Al-Tai	2015–16	First Division	1	0	0	0	—		0	0	1	0
Al-Tai	2016–17	First Division	8	0	0	0	—		1 (Note: Appearances in Crown Prince Cup)	0	9	0
Al-Tai	2017–18	MS League	0	0	0	0	—		—		0	0
Al-Tai	2018–19	MS League	19	0	0	0	—		—		19	0
Al-Tai	2019–20	MS League	31	6	2	0	—		—		33	6
Al-Tai	2020–21	MS League	34	3	—		—		—		34	3
Al-Tai	2021–22	Pro League	20	2	1	0	—		—		21	2
Al-Tai	2022–23	Pro League	7	0	1	0	—		—		8	0
Al-Tai	2023–24	Pro League	14	1	0	0	—		—		14	1
Al-Tai	Total		134	12	4	0	0	0	1	0	139	12
Career totals			134	12	4	0	0	0	1	0	139	12
