= Alfa Semedo =

Bissau-Guinean footballer (born 1997)

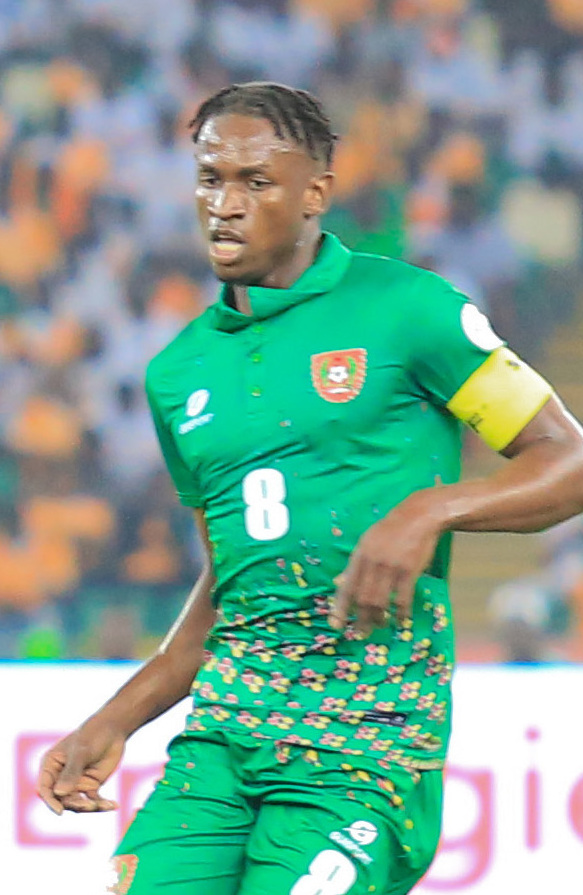
- Semedo in 2024

Personal information
- Full name: Alfa Semedo Esteves
- Date of birth: 30 August 1997 (age 29)
- Place of birth: Bissau, Guinea-Bissau
- Height: 1.89 m (6 ft 2 in)
- Position: Midfielder

Team information
- Current team: Al-Fayha
- Number: 30

Youth career
- 2014: Fidjus di Bideras
- 2014–2016: Benfica

Senior career*
Years	Team	Apps	(Gls)
2016–2017	→ Vilafranquense (loan)	29	(4)
2017–2018	Moreirense	28	(2)
2018–2021	Benfica	5	(1)
2019	→ Espanyol (loan)	3	(0)
2019–2020	→ Nottingham Forest (loan)	24	(2)
2020–2021	→ Reading (loan)	35	(2)
2021–2022	Vitória Guimarães	27	(0)
2022–2024	Al-Tai	60	(3)
2024–2025	Neom	32	(5)
2025–	Al-Fayha	23	(4)

International career^{‡}
2021–	Guinea-Bissau	38	(2)
- * Club domestic league appearances and goals as of 13 March 2026 ‡ National team caps and goals as of 29 September 2026

Alfa Semedo Esteves (born 30 August 1997) is a Bissau-Guinean professional footballer who plays as a midfielder for the Saudi Arabian club Al-Fayha and the Guinea-Bissau national team.

== Club career ==
Born in Bissau, Semedo started playing football at the local club Fidjus di Bideras. In 2014, aged 16, he moved to Portugal and joined the Benfica youth system. After playing two years for their juniors team, he was loaned out to Vilafranquense in Campeonato de Portugal for one season. On 8 July 2017, he signed a four-year contract with Moreirense in Primeira Liga, with whom he would make his professional debut in a Taça da Liga match against Desportivo das Aves on 30 July that year.

Following his return to Benfica in July 2018 for €2.5 million, Semedo debuted for the first team in a 3–2 home win over Vitória de Guimarães in Primeira Liga on 10 August. Later, on 2 October, he made his UEFA Champions League debut, scoring his first and winning goal for Benfica in a 3–2 away victory over AEK Athens in the UEFA Champions League group stage, thus ending the former's eight-match losing streak in the competition's group stage.

On 31 January 2019, Semedo was loaned out to La Liga side RCD Espanyol until June. On 8 July, he joined English club Nottingham Forest on a season-long loan, along with Benfica teammate Yuri Ribeiro (the latter on a permanent transfer). He scored his first goal for the club in a 1–0 away win over Swansea City on 14 September 2019.

Semedo joined Reading on a season-long loan for the 2020–21 season. He made his debut in a 1–0 victory over Wycombe Wanderers on 20 October 2020. He scored his first goal for Reading in a 2–1 win over Luton Town on 26 December 2020.

On 10 August 2022, Semedo joined Saudi Pro League club Al-Tai on a three-year deal.

On 19 July 2024, Semedo joined Saudi First Division League club Neom.

On 20 August 2025, Semedo joined Pro League side Al-Fayha on a three-year deal.

== International career ==
He made his debut for Guinea-Bissau national football team on 26 March 2021 in a 2021 Africa Cup of Nations qualifier against Eswatini and scored the team's second goal in a 3–1 win.

In December 2023, he was selected from the list of 25 Guinea-Bissau players selected by Baciro Candé to compete in the 2023 Africa Cup of Nations.

== Career statistics ==
=== Club ===
As of match played 22 April 2025

Appearances and goals by club, season and competition
Club	Season	League			National cup (Note: Includes Taça de Portugal, FA Cup, King's Cup)		League cup (Note: Includes Taça da Liga, EFL Cup)		Continental		Total	
Club	Season	Division	Apps	Goals	Apps	Goals	Apps	Goals	Apps	Goals	Apps	Goals
Benfica	2016–17	Primeira Liga	0	0	0	0	0	0	—		0	0
Vilafranquense (loan)	2016–17	Campeonato de Portugal	29	4	5	0	0	0	—		34	4
Moreirense	2017–18	Primeira Liga	28	2	3	0	3	1	—		34	3
Benfica	2018–19	Primeira Liga	5	0	2	0	3	0	5 (Note: Appearances in UEFA Champions League)	1	15	1
Benfica	2019–20	Primeira Liga	0	0	0	0	0	0	0	0	0	0
Benfica	Total		5	0	3	0	3	0	5	1	16	1
Espanyol (loan)	2018–19	La Liga	3	0	0	0	—		—		3	0
Nottingham Forest (loan)	2019–20	Championship	24	2	1	0	1	0	—		26	2
Reading (loan)	2020–21	Championship	35	2	1	0	0	0	—		36	2
Vitória de Guimarães	2021–22	Primeira Liga	26	0	2	0	3	0	—		31	0
Vitória de Guimarães	2022–23	Primeira Liga	1	0	—		—		3 (Note: Appearances in UEFA Europa Conference League)	0	4	0
Vitória de Guimarães	Total		27	0	2	0	3	0	3	0	35	0
Al-Tai	2022–23	Saudi Pro League	28	2	1	0	—		—		29	2
Al-Tai	2023–24	Saudi Pro League	32	1	1	0	—		—		33	1
Al-Tai	Total		60	3	2	0	—		—		62	3
Neom	2024–25	Saudi First Division League	32	5	0	0	—		—		32	5
Career total			243	18	15	0	10	1	8	1	258	20

=== International ===
As of match played 29 September 2026

Appearances and goals by national team and year
National team	Year	Apps	Goals
Guinea-Bissau	2021	8	1
Guinea-Bissau	2022	6	0
Guinea-Bissau	2023	6	0
Guinea-Bissau	2024	14	0
Guinea-Bissau	2025	2	0
Guinea-Bissau	2026	2	0
Total		38	2

Scores and results list Guinea-Bissau's goal tally first, score column indicates score after each Semedo goal.

List of international goals scored by Alfa Semedo
No.	Date	Venue	Opponent	Score	Result	Competition
1.	26 March 2021	Mavuso Sports Centre, Manzini, Eswatini	Eswatini	2–1	3–1	2021 Africa Cup of Nations qualification
2.	9 June 2022	Stade Adrar, Agadir, Morocco	São Tomé and Príncipe	1–1	5–1	2023 Africa Cup of Nations qualification

== Honours ==
Benfica

- Primeira Liga: 2018–19
