= Dener (footballer, born 1992) =

Brazilian footballer

Personal information
- Full name: Dener Gomes Clemente
- Date of birth: 13 March 1992 (age 34)
- Place of birth: São Paulo, Brazil
- Height: 1.85 m (6 ft 1 in)
- Position: Midfielder

Team information
- Current team: Volta Redonda
- Number: 8

Youth career
- 2002–2006: Portuguesa
- 2006–2012: São Paulo

Senior career*
Years	Team	Apps	(Gls)
2011–2014	São Paulo	1	(0)
2012	→ Paulista (loan)	13	(2)
2012–2013	→ Guarani (loan)	15	(1)
2014	→ América-RN (loan)	9	(3)
2015–2021	Portimonense	148	(21)
2021–2023	Al-Tai	51	(7)
2023–2024	Portimonense	26	(1)
2025	Remo	2	(1)
2025	→ Volta Redonda (loan)	3	(1)
2026–	Volta Redonda	19	(1)
- * Club domestic league appearances and goals as of 11 November 2026

Dener Gomes Clemente, known simply as Dener, (born 13 March 1992) is a Brazilian professional footballer who plays as a midfielder for Volta Redonda.

== Career statistics ==
As of 14 February 2018

Appearances and goals by club, season and competition
Club	Season	League			National cup		League cup		Other		Total	
Club	Season	Division	Apps	Goals	Apps	Goals	Apps	Goals	Apps	Goals	Apps	Goals
São Paulo	2011	Campeonato Brasileiro Série A	1	0	0	0	0	0	0	0	1	0
São Paulo	2012	Campeonato Brasileiro Série A	0	0	0	0	0	0	0	0	0	0
São Paulo	Total		1	0	0	0	0	0	0	0	1	0
Paulista (loan)	2012	Campeonato Paulista	13	2	1	0	0	0	0	0	14	2
Guarani (loan)	2012	Campeonato Brasileiro Série B	6	0	0	0	0	0	0	0	6	0
Guarani (loan)	2013	Campeonato Paulista	9	1	0	0	0	0	0	0	9	1
Guarani (loan)	Total		15	1	0	0	0	0	0	0	15	1
América RN (loan)	2014	Campeonato Potiguar	9	3	2	0	0	0	2 (Note: Appearances in Copa do Nordeste)	0	13	3
Portimonense	2014–15	Segunda Liga	13	3	0	0	0	0	0	0	13	3
Portimonense	2015–16	LigaPro	21	2	2	0	2	1	0	0	25	3
Portimonense	2016–17	LigaPro	2	0	0	0	0	0	0	0	2	0
Portimonense	2017–18	Primeira Liga	17	2	1	0	3	2	0	0	21	4
Portimonense	Total		53	7	3	0	5	3	0	0	61	10
Career total			91	13	7	0	5	3	2	0	105	16
