= Adrián Martínez (Venezuelan footballer) =

Venezuelan footballer (born 1993)

Personal information
- Full name: Luis Adrián Martínez Olivo
- Date of birth: 14 July 1993 (age 33)
- Place of birth: San Félix, Venezuela
- Height: 1.86 m (6 ft 1 in)
- Position: Centre-back

Team information
- Current team: Al-Hamriyah

Senior career*
Years	Team	Apps	(Gls)
2015	Mineros de Guayana B		
2016	LALA		
2017–2018	Metropolitanos	16	(0)
2018	Chicó de Guayana		
2018–2020	Metropolitanos	40	(2)
2020–2021	Mineros de Guayana	17	(2)
2021	Deportivo La Guaira	16	(1)
2022	Always Ready	12	(0)
2022–2023	Al-Tai	8	(0)
2024–2026	Universidad Central	63	(4)
2026–	Al-Hamriyah	0	(0)

International career^{‡}
2021–	Venezuela	7	(0)
- * Club domestic league appearances and goals as of 30 December 2025 ‡ National team caps and goals as of 09:14, 6 January 2023 (UTC)

Luis Adrián Martínez Olivo, known as Adrián Martínez (born 14 July 1993) is a Venezuelan footballer who plays as a centre back for Al-Hamriyah.

== Club career ==
In 2022 Martínez received notoriety for a bad tackle adjudged as a foul on Argentinian playmaker Lionel Messi during a World Cup qualifier between Argentina and Venezuela. That same year he joined Saudi Arabian side Al-Tai FC on a free transfer from Bolivian side Club Always Ready. He made his debut for Al-Tai on 16 December, 2022 against Abha Club.

== International career ==
He made his debut for the full Venezuela national football team in the 2021 Copa América against Brazil.
