= Victor Braga =

Brazilian footballer

Personal information
- Full name: Victor Hugo Silva Braga
- Date of birth: 17 February 1992 (age 34)
- Place of birth: Salvador, Brazil
- Height: 1.93 m (6 ft 4 in)
- Position: Goalkeeper

Team information
- Current team: Académica de Coimbra
- Number: 12

Youth career
- 2009: Bahia
- 2010: Vitória
- 2010–2011: Marítimo

Senior career*
Years	Team	Apps	(Gls)
2012	Alcanenense		
2012	Uberaba		
2012	Gondomar		
2013	Alcanenense	10	(0)
2014–2015	União de Leiria	24	(0)
2015–2018	Moreirense	1	(0)
2016–2017	→ Famalicão (loan)	27	(0)
2017–2018	→ Freamunde (loan)	15	(0)
2018–2019	Espinho	35	(0)
2019–2022	Arouca	77	(0)
2022–2024	Al-Tai	50	(0)
2024–2025	AEL Limassol	32	(0)
2025–2026	Al-Najma	31	(0)
2026–	Académica de Coimbra	0	(0)
- * Club domestic league appearances and goals as of 11 September 2026

Victor Hugo Silva Braga (born 17 February 1992) is a Brazilian professional football player who plays for Liga Portugal 2 club Académica de Coimbra.

He was trained at Sport Clube Bahia, having gone to Portugal in his last year as a junior.

He played in virtually all Portuguese championships, having represented Arouca in the first division in the 2021–22 season.
