= 2023–24 Al-Tai FC season =

Al-Tai
2023–24 season
- President: Turki Al-Dhabaan
- Manager: Krešimir Režić (until 25 September); Laurențiu Reghecampf (from 25 September until 4 April); Leonardo Ramos (from 15 April)
- Stadium: Prince Abdul Aziz bin Musa'ed Stadium
- Pro League: 17th (relegated)
- King Cup: Round of 32 (knocked out by Al-Faisaly)
- Top goalscorer: League: Bernard Mensah (14); All: Bernard Mensah (14)
- Highest home attendance: 10,898 (vs. Al-Nassr, 29 September 2023)
- Lowest home attendance: 1,172 (vs. Abha, 1 September 2023)
- Average home league attendance: 6,147
- All statistics correct as of 27 May 2024.

The 2023–24 season was Al-Tai's 25th non-consecutive season in the Pro League and their 63rd season in existence. In addition to the Pro League, the club also competed in the King Cup.

The season covers the period from 1 July 2023 to 30 June 2024.

== Players ==
=== Squad information ===
As of 1 February 2024

Note: Flags indicate national team as defined under FIFA eligibility rules; some limited exceptions apply. Players may hold more than one non-FIFA nationality.

No.	Pos.	Nation	Player
1	GK	BRA	Victor Braga
3	DF	KSA	Abdulaziz Majrashi
4	DF	KSA	Abdulkarim Al-Sultan
5	DF	CHI	Enzo Roco
6	MF	KSA	Abdulaziz Al-Harabi
7	MF	KSA	Salman Al-Moasher
8	DF	KSA	Tareq Abdullah
9	FW	CRO	Marko Dugandžić
10	FW	SUR	Virgil Misidjan
11	FW	ROU	Andrei Cordea
12	DF	KSA	Hussain Qassem
13	MF	KSA	Salem Al-Toiawy
17	MF	KSA	Abdulrahman Al-Harthi
18	MF	KSA	Mohammed Al-Qunaian
22	GK	KSA	Bader Al-Enezi
23	DF	KSA	Nawaf Al-Qumairi

No.	Pos.	Nation	Player
26	MF	KSA	Jamal Bajandouh
27	DF	GER	Robert Bauer
30	MF	GBS	Alfa Semedo
40	MF	KSA	Mansour Al-Nakhli
43	MF	GHA	Bernard Mensah
44	GK	KSA	Moataz Al-Baqaawi
45	MF	KSA	Abdulfattah Asiri
50	DF	KSA	Abdulmohsen Fallatah
70	MF	KSA	Rakan Al-Shamlan
77	MF	KSA	Hassan Al-Omari
80	DF	KSA	Safwan Al-Johani
86	FW	KSA	Amer Khalil
88	DF	KSA	Ibrahim Al-Nakhli
90	FW	KSA	Adeeb Al-Haizan
99	FW	KSA	Hazaa Al-Hazaa

=== Out on loan ===
Note: Flags indicate national team as defined under FIFA eligibility rules; some limited exceptions apply. Players may hold more than one non-FIFA nationality.

No.	Pos.	Nation	Player
21	DF	KSA	Ibrahim Al Ali (at Al-Lewaa until 30 June 2024)
24	MF	KSA	Talal Al-Showaiqi (at Al-Lewaa until 30 June 2024)
31	MF	KSA	Abdullah Nahar (at Al-Lewaa until 30 June 2024)
55	DF	KSA	Yazan Al-Buhairan (at Al-Qala until 30 June 2024)

No.	Pos.	Nation	Player
87	DF	KSA	Mohammed Marzouq (at Al-Lewaa until 30 June 2024)
93	MF	KSA	Hatem Al-Mishhen (at Al-Lewaa until 30 June 2024)
—	GK	KSA	Fahad Al-Sader (at Al-Rayyan until 30 June 2024)

== Transfers and loans ==
=== Transfers in ===
Entry date	Position	No.	Player	From club	Fee	Ref.
30 June 2023	DF	87	(Saudi Arabia) Mohammed Marzouq	(Saudi Arabia) Wej	End of loan	
30 June 2023	MF	80	(Saudi Arabia) Abdullah Hajaj	(Saudi Arabia) Al-Shoulla	End of loan	
30 June 2023	MF	–	(Saudi Arabia) Talal Al-Showaiqi	(Saudi Arabia) Al-Orobah	End of loan	
30 June 2023	FW	90	(Saudi Arabia) Adeeb Al-Haizan	(Saudi Arabia) Al-Orobah	End of loan	
1 July 2023	DF	27	(Germany) Robert Bauer	(Belgium) Sint-Truidense	Free	
15 July 2023	DF	88	(Saudi Arabia) Ibrahim Al-Nakhli	(Saudi Arabia) Damac	Free	
15 July 2023	MF	17	(Saudi Arabia) Abdulrahman Al-Harthi	(Saudi Arabia) Al-Ain	Free	
15 July 2023	MF	43	(Ghana) Bernard Mensah	(Turkey) Kayserispor	Free	
15 July 2023	MF	45	(Saudi Arabia) Abdulfattah Asiri	(Finland) IFK Mariehamn	Free	
15 July 2023	MF	70	(Saudi Arabia) Rakan Al-Shamlan	(Saudi Arabia) Al-Batin	Free	
15 July 2023	FW	10	(Suriname) Virgil Misidjan	(Netherlands) Twente	Free	
18 July 2023	DF	8	(Saudi Arabia) Tareq Abdullah	(Saudi Arabia) Al-Taawoun	Free	
28 July 2023	DF	5	(Chile) Enzo Roco	(Spain) Elche	Free	
22 August 2023	FW	11	(Romania) Andrei Cordea	(Romania) FCSB	$1,432,000	
7 September 2023	FW	9	(Croatia) Marko Dugandžić	(Romania) Rapid București	$2,142,000	
11 September 2023	MF	7	(Saudi Arabia) Salman Al-Moasher	(Saudi Arabia) Al-Ahli	Free	
12 September 2023	MF	77	(Saudi Arabia) Hassan Al-Omari	(Saudi Arabia) Al-Taawoun	Free	

=== Transfers out ===
Exit date	Position	No.	Player	To club	Fee	Ref.
30 June 2023	MF	7	(Saudi Arabia) Mukhtar Ali	(Saudi Arabia) Al-Nassr	End of loan	
30 June 2023	MF	24	(Saudi Arabia) Khalil Al-Absi	(Saudi Arabia) Al-Nassr	End of loan	
30 June 2023	MF	27	(Saudi Arabia) Abdullah Al-Jouei	(Saudi Arabia) Al-Shabab	End of loan	
1 July 2023	MF	11	(Zimbabwe) Knowledge Musona	(Saudi Arabia) Al-Riyadh	Free	
8 July 2023	MF	10	(Algeria) Amir Sayoud	(Saudi Arabia) Al-Raed	Free	
11 July 2023	FW	32	(Saudi Arabia) Fahad Al-Johani	(Saudi Arabia) Damac	Free	
20 July 2023	MF	75	(Saudi Arabia) Mohammed Harzan	(Saudi Arabia) Ohod	Free	
29 July 2023	DF	19	(Saudi Arabia) Hassan Al-Jubairi	(Saudi Arabia) Al-Batin	Free	
31 July 2023	FW	9	(Republic of the Congo) Guy Mbenza	(Qatar) Muaither	Undisclosed	
1 August 2023	DF	66	(Saudi Arabia) Nawaf Al-Arifi	(Saudi Arabia) Jeddah	Free	
23 August 2023	MF	8	(Brazil) Dener	(Portugal) Portimonense	Free	
17 September 2023	MF	15	(Saudi Arabia) Abdulwahab Jaafer	(Saudi Arabia) Al-Safa	Free	
3 October 2023	MF	80	(Saudi Arabia) Abdullah Hajaj	(Saudi Arabia) Al-Qala	Free	
20 December 2023	DF	5	(Venezuela) Adrián Martínez	(Venezuela) Universidad Central	Free	
26 December 2023	DF	40	(Cameroon) Collins Fai	(Serbia) Radnički Niš	Free	

=== Loans out ===
Start date	End date	Position	No.	Player	To club	Fee	Ref.
13 July 2023	16 January 2024	MF	55	(Saudi Arabia) Yazan Al-Buhairan	(Saudi Arabia) Al-Qaisumah	None	
15 July 2023	End of season	DF	21	(Saudi Arabia) Ibrahim Al Ali	(Saudi Arabia) Al-Lewaa	None	
5 September 2023	End of season	MF	31	(Saudi Arabia) Abdullah Nahar	(Saudi Arabia) Al-Lewaa	None	
7 September 2023	End of season	MF	24	(Saudi Arabia) Talal Al-Showaiqi	(Saudi Arabia) Al-Lewaa	None	
7 September 2023	End of season	MF	93	(Saudi Arabia) Hatem Al-Mishhen	(Saudi Arabia) Al-Lewaa	None	
8 September 2023	End of season	DF	87	(Saudi Arabia) Mohammed Marzouq	(Saudi Arabia) Al-Lewaa	None	
8 September 2023	End of season	GK	–	(Saudi Arabia) Fahad Al-Sader	(Saudi Arabia) Al-Rayyan	None	
16 January 2024	End of season	DF	55	(Saudi Arabia) Yazan Al-Buhairan	(Saudi Arabia) Al-Qala	None	

== Pre-season ==
13 July 2023 Friendly	Al-Tai (Saudi Arabia)	1–3	(Slovenia) NŠ Mura	Murska Sobota, Slovenia
CEST	Al-Harthi 43'	Report	Jovićević 22'; Turudija 53'; Klepač 89' (pen.)	Stadium: Fazanerija City Stadium

19 July 2023 Friendly	Al-Tai (Saudi Arabia)	0–2	(Cyprus) AEK Larnaca	Söchau, Austria
CEST		Report	Faraj 45+1'; Gyurcsó 62'	Stadium: Krauterdorf Stadion

24 July 2023 Friendly	Al-Tai (Saudi Arabia)	0–1	(Bosnia and Herzegovina) NK Stupčanica	Stojnci, Slovenia
18:00 CEST		Report	Shuaib	Stadium: Stojnci Sports Park

27 July 2023 Friendly	Al-Tai (Saudi Arabia)	2–1	(United Arab Emirates) Ittihad Kalba	Gornja Radgona, Slovenia
CEST	Mensah; Al-Shamlan	Report	Parra	Stadium: Stadion Gornja Radgona

== Competitions ==
=== Overview ===
Competition	Record							
Competition	G	W	D	L	GF	GA	GD	Win %
Pro League	34	8	7	19	34	64	−30	23.53
King Cup	1	0	0	1	0	2	−2	0.00
Total	35	8	7	20	34	66	−32	22.86

Updated to match played 27 May 2024
Source: Competitions

=== Pro League ===
==== League table ====
Pos	Team	Pld	W	D	L	GF	GA	GD	Pts	Qualification or relegation
14	Al-Riyadh	34	8	11	15	33	57	−24	35	
15	Al-Okhdood	34	9	6	19	33	52	−19	33	
16	Abha (R)	34	9	5	20	38	87	−49	32	Relegation to Yelo League
17	Al-Tai (R)	34	8	7	19	34	64	−30	31	Relegation to Yelo League
18	Al-Hazem (R)	34	4	12	18	34	76	−42	24	Relegation to Yelo League

Source: SPL
Rules for classification: 1) Points; 2) Head-to-head points; 3) Head-to-head goal difference; 4) Total goal difference; 5) Total goals scored; 6) Fair-play points
(Note: Head-to-head record is used only after all the matches between the teams in question have been played).
(R) Relegated

==== Results summary ====
Overall								Home						Away					
Pld	W	D	L	GF	GA	GD	Pts	W	D	L	GF	GA	GD	W	D	L	GF	GA	GD
34	8	7	19	34	64	−30	31	6	4	7	22	29	−7	2	3	12	12	35	−23

Last updated: 27 May 2024.
Source: spl.com.sa

==== Results by round ====
Round	1	2	3	4	5	6	7	8	9	10	11	12	13	14	15	16	17	18	19	20	21	22	23	24	25	26	27	28	29	30	31	32	33	34
Ground	H	A	H	A	H	A	A	H	A	A	H	H	A	H	A	H	A	A	H	A	H	A	H	H	A	H	H	A	A	H	A	H	A	H
Result	W	L	L	L	W	D	L	L	L	L	W	D	L	W	W	L	L	L	L	D	L	L	W	D	L	L	D	W	L	D	D	W	L	L
Position	6	10	12	14	11	9	12	14	16	16	14	13	15	13	11	12	13	14	16	16	16	16	16	16	16	16	17	14	16	17	17	15	16	17

Updated to match(es) played on 27 May 2024. Source: spl.com.sa
A = Away; H = Home; W = Win; D = Draw; L = Loss

==== Matches ====
All times are local, AST (UTC+3).

Win Draw Loss Postponed

12 August 2023 1	Al-Tai	1–0	Damac	Ha'il
18:00	Al-Harabi 79'	Report	Hawsawi (yellow card) 25'; Munshi (yellow card) 28'; Abu Sharara (yellow card) 40'; Makin (yellow card) 82'; Bedrane (yellow card) 90+4'	Stadium: Prince Abdul Aziz bin Musa'ed Stadium; Attendance: 1,750; Referee: Abdullah Al-Harbi

19 August 2023 2	Al-Ittihad	2–0	Al-Tai	Jeddah
21:00	O. Hawsawi (yellow card) 34'; Hamdallah 54'; Coronado (yellow card) 75'; Al-Amri 90'	Report	Semedo (yellow card) 25'; Qassem (yellow card) 90+4'	Stadium: Prince Abdullah Al Faisal Stadium; Attendance: 21,460; Referee: César Arturo Ramos (Mexico)

24 August 2023 3	Al-Tai	0–3	Al-Wehda	Ha'il
18:00	Al-Shamlan (yellow card) 20'	Report	Fajr 34' (pen.); Al-Muwallad 62'; Al Hejji (yellow card) 75'; Ighalo 90+2'	Stadium: Prince Abdul Aziz bin Musa'ed Stadium; Attendance: 2,217; Referee: Mohammed Al-Beredi

29 August 2023 4	Al-Ahli	2–0	Al-Tai	Jeddah
21:00	Mahrez 39'; Kessié 59'; Al-Asmari (yellow card) 90+2'; Demiral (yellow card) 90+6'	Report	Semedo (red card) 35'; Abdullah (yellow card) 43'; Braga (yellow card) 60'	Stadium: Prince Abdullah Al Faisal Stadium; Attendance: 21,530; Referee: Fedayi San (Switzerland)

1 September 2023 5	Al-Tai	1–0	Abha	Ha'il
18:00	Al-Shamlan (yellow card) 53'; Al-Sultan (yellow card) 78'; Cordea 83'; Al-Harthi (yellow card) 90+6'	Report	Krychowiak (yellow card) 90+3'	Stadium: Prince Abdul Aziz bin Musa'ed Stadium; Attendance: 1,172; Referee: Faisal Al-Blwi

16 September 2023 6	Al-Hazem	1–1	Al-Tai	Ar Rass
18:00	Al-Sayyali (yellow card) 21'; Ricardo (yellow card) 25'; Tozé 45+4' (pen.); Al-Aazmi (yellow card) 59'; Viana (yellow card) 83'; M. Al-Shammari (yellow card) 90+4'	Report	Mensah 12' (pen.), (yellow card) 50'; Qassem (yellow card) 43'; Al-Nakhli (yellow card) 57'	Stadium: Al-Hazem Club Stadium; Attendance: 554; Referee: Mohammed Al-Daqqash

21 September 2023 7	Al-Ettifaq	4–3	Al-Tai	Dammam
18:00	Wijnaldum 2', 72'; Al-Shamrani (yellow card) 28'; Dembélé 41', 90+3'; H. Al-Ghamdi (yellow card) 84'; Al-Kuwaykibi (yellow card) 90+1'	Report	Mensah 10', 36', 54', (yellow card) 67'; Semedo (yellow card) 45+3'	Stadium: Prince Mohamed bin Fahd Stadium; Attendance: 4,865; Referee: Mamdouh Al Shahdan

29 September 2023 8	Al-Tai	1–2	Al-Nassr	Ha'il
18:00	Dugandžić (yellow card) 37'; Misidjan 79', (yellow card) 82'; Al-Harabi (yellow card) 86'; Roco (yellow card) 86'	Report	Talisca 32'; Al-Khaibari (yellow card) 59'; Ronaldo 87' (pen.); Mané (yellow card) 90+1'	Stadium: Prince Abdul Aziz bin Musa'ed Stadium; Attendance: 10,898; Referee: Matthew Conger (New Zealand)

5 October 2023 9	Al-Taawoun	3–0	Al-Tai	Buraidah
18:00	Barrow 11'; Pedro 13'; Medrán 57'	Report	Dugandžić (yellow card) 6'; Mensah (yellow card) 38'	Stadium: Al-Taawoun Club Stadium; Attendance: 3,244; Referee: Sami Al-Jires

21 October 2023 10	Al-Shabab	2–0	Al-Tai	Riyadh
21:00	Diallo 50'; Al-Qahtani (yellow card) 81', (goal) 90+5'	Report	Qassem (yellow card) 8'; Dugandžić (yellow card) 14'; Misidjan (yellow card) 38'	Stadium: Al-Shabab Club Stadium; Attendance: 11,974; Referee: Shukri Al-Hanfoush

27 October 2023 11	Al-Tai	3–2	Al-Riyadh	Ha'il
18:00	Dugandžić 28'; Al-Shamlan (yellow card) 37', (goal) 45+2'; Semedo 40'; Cordea (yellow card) 89'	Report	Al Abbas 8'; Kurdi (yellow card) 89'; Touré 90+2' (pen.)	Stadium: Prince Abdul Aziz bin Musa'ed Stadium; Attendance: 3,270; Referee: Abdulsamad Bakri

3 November 2023 12	Al-Tai	3–3	Al-Fayha	Ha'il
18:00	Roco 21'; Al-Shamlan 24'; Mensah 29'; Al-Nakhli (yellow card) 45'	Report	Nwakaeme 15'; Ryller (yellow card) 40'; Sakala (yellow card) 50', (goal) 70'; Onyekuru 67'; Al-Safri (yellow card) 87'; Al-Enezi (yellow card) 90+1'	Stadium: Prince Abdul Aziz bin Musa'ed Stadium; Attendance: 4,331; Referee: Faisal Al-Blwi

9 November 2023 13	Al-Khaleej	3–1	Al-Tai	Khobar
18:00	Narey (yellow card) 8' (yellow-red card) 45+12', (goal) 45+1' (pen.); Hamzi (yellow card) 45+3'; Rodrigues (yellow card) 52'; Martins 61'; Sherif 73'	Report	Bauer (yellow card) 2'; Al-Qumairi (red card) 27'; Mensah 29'; Braga (yellow card) 32'; Cordea (yellow card) 80'	Stadium: Prince Saud bin Jalawi Stadium; Attendance: 2,100; Referee: Abdulrahman Al-Sultan

24 November 2023 14	Al-Tai	4–3	Al-Raed	Ha'il
21:00	Asiri (yellow card) 25'; Mensah 45' (pen.), 90+9' (pen.); Cordea (yellow card) 82'; Al-Fahad 90+2' (o.g.); Misidjan 90+10'	Report	Tavares 12' (pen.); Sunbul 27'; Al-Beshe (yellow card) 30' (yellow-red card) 45+1'; Wohaishi (yellow card) 59'; El Berkaoui 72'	Stadium: Prince Abdul Aziz bin Musa'ed Stadium; Attendance: 4,112; Referee: Abdulsamad Bakri

2 December 2023 15	Al-Fateh	0–1	Al-Tai	Al-Hasa
18:00	Al-Najdi (yellow card) 46'; Ali (yellow card) 68'; Batna (yellow card) 84'; Denayer (yellow card) 85'	Report	Mensah (yellow card) 21', (goal) 87' (pen.); Al-Nakhli (yellow card) 35'; Bauer (yellow card) 66'; Al-Harabi (yellow card) 90+10'	Stadium: Al-Fateh Club Stadium; Attendance: 7,471; Referee: Faisal Al-Blwi

8 December 2023 16	Al-Tai	1–2	Al-Hilal	Ha'il
18:00	Roco (yellow card) 34'; Abdullah 45+5', (yellow card) 90+6'; Cordea (yellow card) 79'	Report	S. Al-Dawsari 20'; Mitrović 30' (pen.); Milinković-Savić (yellow card) 88'; N. Al-Dawsari (yellow card) 90+7'	Stadium: Prince Abdul Aziz bin Musa'ed Stadium; Attendance: 10,653; Referee: Alexis Herrera (Venezuela)

14 December 2023 17	Al-Okhdood	1–0	Al-Tai	Najran
18:00	Al-Muwallad (yellow card) 38'; Tănase 56'; Al-Rubaie (yellow card) 65'	Report		Stadium: Prince Hathloul bin Abdul Aziz Sports City; Attendance: 439; Referee: Mohammed Al-Harbi

21 December 2023 18	Damac	3–0	Al-Tai	Khamis Mushait
18:00	Chafaï 57'; Bedrane 85'; Ceesay (yellow card) 90+3'; Stanciu 90+11'	Report	Majrashi (yellow card) 55'; Dugandžić (yellow card) 63'; Mensah (yellow card) 74' (yellow-red card) 90+1'; Al-Toiawy (yellow card) 78'; Al-Moasher (yellow card) 88'	Stadium: Damac Club Stadium; Attendance: 2,707; Referee: Sultan Al-Okairy

7 February 2024 19	Al-Tai	0–3	Al-Ittihad	Ha'il
21:00	Bauer (yellow card) 15'; Roco (yellow card) 51'; Al-Omari (yellow card) 62'	Report	Hamdallah 8'; F. Al-Ghamdi 42'; Al-Farhan (yellow card) 45'; A. Al-Ghamdi (yellow card) 70'; Romarinho 87'	Stadium: Prince Abdul Aziz bin Musa'ed Stadium; Attendance: 4,814; Referee: Sergei Karasev (Russia)

16 February 2024 20	Al-Wehda	1–1	Al-Tai	Mecca
20:00	Al-Hejji (yellow card) 1'; El Yamiq 72'; Bakshween (yellow card) 77'	Report	Al-Johani (yellow card) 42'; Cordea 90+8'	Stadium: King Abdul Aziz Stadium; Attendance: 848; Referee: Khaled Al-Teris

24 February 2024 21	Al-Tai	1–4	Al-Ahli	Ha'il
17:00	Roco (yellow card) 18'; Mensah 43', (yellow card) 70'; Al-Moasher (yellow card) 45+2'; Braga (yellow card) 45+8'; Al-Nakhli (yellow card) 51'	Report	Firmino 45+8', 60'; Al-Majhad (yellow card) 53'; Mahrez 82'; Kessié 88'	Stadium: Prince Abdul Aziz bin Musa'ed Stadium; Attendance: 7,079; Referee: Mohammed Al-Hakim (Sweden)

1 March 2024 22	Abha	2–0	Al-Tai	Abha
17:00	Krychowiak 38', 49'; Sami (yellow card) 57'; Al-Jumayah (yellow card) 89'	Report	Bajandouh (yellow card) 21'; Al-Omari (yellow card) 29'; Al-Toiawy (yellow card) 63'	Stadium: Prince Sultan bin Abdul Aziz Stadium; Attendance: 689; Referee: Abdulsamad Bakri

8 March 2024 23	Al-Tai	1–0	Al-Hazem	Ha'il
17:00	Mensah 6'; Misidjan (yellow card) 74'; Al-Harthi (yellow card) 90+7'	Report	Al-Juwaid (yellow card) 78'; Ricardo (yellow card) 90+8'	Stadium: Prince Abdul Aziz bin Musa'ed Stadium; Attendance: 5,323; Referee: Sultan Al-Harbi

15 March 2024 24	Al-Tai	1–1	Al-Ettifaq	Ha'il
22:00	Misidjan 45+4'; Al-Shamlan (yellow card) 58'; Al-Nakhli (yellow card) 82'	Report	Toko Ekambi 18'; Fofana (yellow card) 40'; Hendry (yellow card) 54'; Al-Shamrani (yellow card) 75'; Gray (red card) 90+7'	Stadium: Prince Abdul Aziz bin Musa'ed Stadium; Attendance: 7,149; Referee: Khaled Al-Teris

30 March 2024 25	Al-Nassr	5–1	Al-Tai	Riyadh
22:00	Otávio 20'; Telles (yellow card) 43'; Ghareeb 45+7'; Brozović (yellow card) 62'; Ronaldo 64', 67', 87'; Lajami (yellow card) 73'; Al Fatil (yellow card) 90+3'	Report	Misidjan (yellow card) 14' (yellow-red card) 36', (goal) 22'	Stadium: Al-Awwal Park; Attendance: 12,427; Referee: Abdullah Al-Harbi

2 April 2024 26	Al-Tai	2–3	Al-Taawoun	Ha'il
22:00	Girotto 20' (o.g.); Dugandžić 30'; Al-Moasher (yellow card) 72'	Report	Al-Shammeri 45+2'; Pedro 73'; Al-Abdulrazzaq (yellow card) 77'; Al-Kuwaykibi 86'	Stadium: Prince Abdul Aziz bin Musa'ed Stadium; Attendance: 7,022; Referee: Abdullah Al-Kharboush

6 April 2024 27	Al-Tai	0–0	Al-Shabab	Ha'il
22:00	Al-Nakhli (yellow card) 75'; Bauer (yellow card) 90+2'	Report	Cuéllar (yellow card) 40'; Saïss (yellow card) 89'	Stadium: Prince Abdul Aziz bin Musa'ed Stadium; Attendance: 7,879; Referee: Sultan Al-Harbi

19 April 2024 28	Al-Riyadh	1–2	Al-Tai	Riyadh
18:00	Al-Nowaiqi (yellow card) 31'; Al-Khaibari (red card) 52'; Al-Harajin 59'	Report	Al-Toiawy (yellow card) 29'; Semedo (yellow card) 31'; Mensah (yellow card) 41', (goal) 45+1'; Al-Shamlan (yellow card) 90'; Roco (yellow card) 90+9'; Al-Shuwayyi 90+12' (o.g.); Al-Nakhli (yellow card) 90+14'	Stadium: Prince Faisal bin Fahd Stadium; Attendance: 1,631; Referee: Faisal Al-Blwi

25 April 2024 29	Al-Fayha	1–0	Al-Tai	Al Majma'ah
18:00	Al-Khaibari (yellow card) 8'; R. Kaabi (yellow card) 38'; Sabiri (yellow card) 45+4'; Mandash 47'	Report	Al-Shamlan (yellow card) 22'; Al-Nakhli (yellow card) 34'; Al-Johani (yellow card) 54'	Stadium: Al Majma'ah Sports City; Attendance: 572; Referee: Abdulsamad Bakri

4 May 2024 30	Al-Tai	0–0	Al-Khaleej	Ha'il
18:00	Al-Johani (yellow card) 88'; Roco (yellow card) 90+7'	Report	Jung Woo-young (yellow card) 37'	Stadium: Prince Abdul Aziz bin Musa'ed Stadium; Attendance: 7,423; Referee: Khaled Al-Teris

11 May 2024 31	Al-Raed	1–1	Al-Tai	Buraidah
18:00	Al-Fahad (yellow card) 5'; Fouzair (yellow card) 45+7', (goal) 51'; Al-Jayzani (yellow card) 89'	Report	Abdullah (yellow card) 21'; Al-Nakhli 29'; Bauer (yellow card) 65'; Al-Toiawy (yellow card) 90'	Stadium: Al-Raed Club Stadium; Attendance: 4,674; Referee: Majed Al-Shamrani

16 May 2024 32	Al-Tai	3–1	Al-Fateh	Ha'il
18:00	Bauer 12'; Mensah 83', 90+10'; Asiri (yellow card) 90+3'	Report	Djaniny 4'; Al-Zubaidi (yellow card) 45+6' (yellow-red card) 57'; Al-Harbi (yellow card) 90+7'	Stadium: Prince Abdul Aziz bin Musa'ed Stadium; Attendance: 8,897; Referee: Sultan Al-Harbi

23 May 2024 33	Al-Hilal	3–1	Al-Tai	Riyadh
21:00	S. Al-Dawsari 17'; Abdulhamid (yellow card) 22'; Michael 44', (yellow card) 45'; Malcom 60', (yellow card) 84'	Report	Cordea 64'	Stadium: Al-Shabab Club Stadium; Attendance: 9,315; Referee: Faisal Al-Blwi

27 May 2024 34	Al-Tai	0–2	Al-Okhdood	Ha'il
21:00	Semedo (yellow card) 29'; Abdullah (yellow card) 39'	Report	Asiri (yellow card) 10'; Al-Zabdani (yellow card) 20'; Godwin 42'; Al-Zubaidi (yellow card) 45+3'; Tawamba 50'; Al-Muwallad (yellow card) 68'	Stadium: Prince Abdul Aziz bin Musa'ed Stadium; Attendance: 10,501; Referee: Khaled Al-Teris

=== King Cup ===
All times are local, AST (UTC+3).

26 September 2023 Round of 32	Al-Faisaly	2–0	Al-Tai	Al Majma'ah
21:00	Barnawi (yellow card) 45+1'; Garita (yellow card) 51', (goal) 54'; Fallatah (yellow card) 52'; Morato (yellow card) 84'; Mikels 87'	Report	Bauer (yellow card) 23'; Al-Harthi (yellow card) 46'	Stadium: Al Majma'ah Sports City; Referee: Ahmed Al-Rumaikhani

== Statistics ==
=== Appearances ===
Last updated on 27 May 2024.

No.	Pos	Nat	Player	Total		Pro League		King Cup	
No.	Pos	Nat	Player	Apps	Goals	Apps	Goals	Apps	Goals
Goalkeepers
1	GK	(Brazil) BRA	Victor Braga	21	0	20	0	1	0
22	GK	(Saudi Arabia) KSA	Bader Al-Enezi	0	0	0	0	0	0
44	GK	(Saudi Arabia) KSA	Moataz Al-Baqaawi	14	0	14	0	0	0
Defenders
3	DF	(Saudi Arabia) KSA	Abdulaziz Majrashi	19	0	11+7	0	1	0
4	DF	(Saudi Arabia) KSA	Abdulkarim Al-Sultan	6	0	1+5	0	0	0
5	DF	(Chile) CHI	Enzo Roco	30	1	30	1	0	0
8	DF	(Saudi Arabia) KSA	Tareq Abdullah	21	1	17+3	1	1	0
12	DF	(Saudi Arabia) KSA	Hussain Qassem	12	0	11	0	1	0
13	DF	(Saudi Arabia) KSA	Salem Al-Toiawy	16	0	8+8	0	0	0
23	DF	(Saudi Arabia) KSA	Nawaf Al-Qumairi	11	0	5+6	0	0	0
27	DF	(Germany) GER	Robert Bauer	34	1	33	1	1	0
50	DF	(Saudi Arabia) KSA	Abdulmohsen Fallatah	0	0	0	0	0	0
80	DF	(Saudi Arabia) KSA	Safwan Al-Johani	14	0	12+2	0	0	0
88	DF	(Saudi Arabia) KSA	Ibrahim Al-Nakhli	33	1	29+3	1	1	0
Midfielders
6	MF	(Saudi Arabia) KSA	Abdulaziz Al-Harabi	14	1	2+12	1	0	0
7	MF	(Saudi Arabia) KSA	Salman Al-Moasher	18	0	10+8	0	0	0
17	MF	(Saudi Arabia) KSA	Abdulrahman Al-Harthi	22	0	4+17	0	0+1	0
18	MF	(Saudi Arabia) KSA	Mohammed Al-Qunaian	4	0	1+3	0	0	0
26	MF	(Saudi Arabia) KSA	Jamal Bajandouh	12	0	4+8	0	0	0
30	MF	(Guinea-Bissau) GBS	Alfa Semedo	33	1	32	1	1	0
40	MF	(Saudi Arabia) KSA	Mansour Al-Nakhli	0	0	0	0	0	0
43	MF	(Ghana) GHA	Bernard Mensah	31	14	30	14	1	0
45	MF	(Saudi Arabia) KSA	Abdulfattah Asiri	17	0	8+8	0	1	0
70	MF	(Saudi Arabia) KSA	Rakan Al-Shamlan	24	2	16+7	2	0+1	0
77	MF	(Saudi Arabia) KSA	Hassan Al-Omari	4	0	1+3	0	0	0
Forwards
9	FW	(Croatia) CRO	Marko Dugandžić	24	2	19+4	2	1	0
10	FW	(Suriname) SUR	Virgil Misidjan	30	4	25+4	4	1	0
11	FW	(Romania) ROU	Andrei Cordea	29	3	25+4	3	0	0
86	FW	(Saudi Arabia) KSA	Amer Abdulrahman	2	0	0+2	0	0	0
90	FW	(Saudi Arabia) KSA	Adeeb Al-Haizan	20	0	4+15	0	0+1	0
99	FW	(Saudi Arabia) KSA	Hazaa Al-Hazaa	9	0	2+7	0	0	0

=== Goalscorers ===
Rank	No.	Pos	Nat	Name	Pro League	King Cup	Total
1	43	MF	(Ghana)	Bernard Mensah	14	0	14
2	10	FW	(Suriname)	Virgil Misidjan	4	0	4
3	11	FW	(Romania)	Andrei Cordea	3	0	3
4	9	FW	(Croatia)	Marko Dugandžić	2	0	2
4	70	MF	(Saudi Arabia)	Rakan Al-Shamlan	2	0	2
6	5	DF	(Chile)	Enzo Roco	1	0	1
6	6	MF	(Saudi Arabia)	Abdulaziz Al-Harabi	1	0	1
6	8	DF	(Saudi Arabia)	Tareq Abdullah	1	0	1
6	27	DF	(Germany)	Robert Bauer	1	0	1
6	30	MF	(Guinea-Bissau)	Alfa Semedo	1	0	1
6	88	DF	(Saudi Arabia)	Ibrahim Al-Nakhli	1	0	1
Own goal					3	0	3
Total					34	0	34

Last Updated: 23 May 2024

=== Assists ===
Rank	No.	Pos	Nat	Name	Pro League	King Cup	Total
1	11	FW	(Romania)	Andrei Cordea	4	0	4
2	10	FW	(Suriname)	Virgil Misidjan	3	0	3
2	30	MF	(Guinea-Bissau)	Alfa Semedo	3	0	3
4	17	MF	(Saudi Arabia)	Abdulrahman Al-Harthi	2	0	2
4	27	DF	(Germany)	Robert Bauer	2	0	2
4	43	MF	(Ghana)	Bernard Mensah	2	0	2
7	7	MF	(Saudi Arabia)	Salman Al-Moasher	1	0	1
7	9	FW	(Croatia)	Marko Dugandžić	1	0	1
7	12	DF	(Saudi Arabia)	Hussain Qassem	1	0	1
7	70	MF	(Saudi Arabia)	Rakan Al-Shamlan	1	0	1
Total					20	0	20

Last Updated: 23 May 2024

=== Clean sheets ===
Rank	No.	Pos	Nat	Name	Pro League	King Cup	Total
1	1	GK	(Brazil)	Victor Braga	4	0	4
2	44	GK	(Saudi Arabia)	Moataz Al-Baqaawi	2	0	2
Total					6	0	6

Last Updated: 4 May 2024
