= 2021–22 Al-Tai FC season =

Al-Tai
2021–22 season
- President: Turki Al-Dhabaan
- Manager: Mohamed Kouki (until 28 August); Zoran Manojlović (from 30 August until 4 November); José Luis Sierra (from 7 November)
- Stadium: Prince Abdul Aziz bin Musa'ed Stadium
- Pro League: 6th
- King Cup: Round of 16 (knocked out by Al-Taawoun)
- Top goalscorer: League: Knowledge Musona (6 goals); All: Knowledge Musona (6 goals)
- Highest home attendance: 7,762 (vs. Al-Ahli, 21 October 2021)
- Lowest home attendance: 3,036 (vs. Al-Batin, 12 February 2022)
- Average home league attendance: 5,317
- All statistics correct as of 27 June 2022.

The 2021–22 season was Al-Tai's 61st year in existence and their first season back in the Pro League following their promotion from the MS League in the previous season. The club participated in the Pro League and the King Cup.

This was Al-Tai's first season in the top flight of Saudi football since the 2007–08 season.

The season covered the period from 1 July 2021 to 30 June 2022.

== Players ==
=== Squad information ===
As of 1 September 2022

Note: Flags indicate national team as defined under FIFA eligibility rules; some limited exceptions apply. Players may hold more than one non-FIFA nationality.

No.	Pos.	Nation	Player
1	GK	KSA	Nawaf Al-Aqidi (on loan from Al-Nassr)
3	DF	KSA	Abdulaziz Majrashi
4	DF	KSA	Abdulkarim Al-Sultan
6	MF	KSA	Abdulaziz Al-Harabi
7	MF	KSA	Mohammed Al-Aqel
8	MF	BRA	Dener
9	FW	SUI	Cephas Malele
10	MF	ALG	Amir Sayoud
11	MF	ZIM	Knowledge Musona
12	MF	KSA	Salem Al-Toiawy
13	DF	KSA	Ibrahim Al-Zubaidi
15	DF	KSA	Nawaf Al-Arifi
16	MF	KSA	Mohammed Attiyah (on loan from Al-Shabab)
18	MF	KSA	Abdulkareem Al-Qahtani (on loan from Al-Wehda)
19	DF	KSA	Hassan Al-Jubairi
20	FW	KSA	Adeeb Al-Haizan
21	DF	KSA	Ibrahim Al-Ali
22	GK	KSA	Bader Al-Enezi
23	DF	KSA	Abdullah Hassoun (on loan from Al-Ahli)

No.	Pos.	Nation	Player
24	MF	KSA	Talal Al-Showaiqi
26	MF	KSA	Jamal Bajandouh (on loan from Al-Shabab)
27	MF	KSA	Abdulwahab Jaafer
30	FW	ARG	Tobías Figueroa (on loan from Deportes Antofagasta)
32	FW	KSA	Fahad Al-Johani
34	DF	KSA	Yazan Al-Buhairan
40	DF	CMR	Collins Fai
42	MF	KSA	Hamed Fallatah (on loan from Al-Faisaly)
44	DF	BRA	Marcelo
47	MF	KSA	Hatem Al-Enezi
55	DF	MWI	Rayane Hamidou (on loan from Al-Ahli)
66	MF	KSA	Murad Al-Enezi
70	FW	KSA	Mohammed Al-Thani (on loan from Ohod)
75	MF	KSA	Mohammed Harzan
77	GK	KSA	Turki Al-Shammari
79	MF	KSA	Mukhtar Ali (on loan from Al-Nassr)
80	MF	KSA	Abdullah Hajaj
87	DF	KSA	Mohammed Marzouq
99	FW	KSA	Mohammed Maran (on loan from Al-Nassr)

=== Out on loan ===
Note: Flags indicate national team as defined under FIFA eligibility rules; some limited exceptions apply. Players may hold more than one non-FIFA nationality.

No.	Pos.	Nation	Player
2	DF	KSA	Nasser Al-Hulayel (at Al-Khaleej until 30 June 2022)
17	MF	KSA	Khaled Eid (at Hajer until 30 June 2022)
29	MF	KSA	Faisal Al-Musallamani (at Al-Lewaa until 30 June 2022)

No.	Pos.	Nation	Player
85	MF	KSA	Omar Al-Aidaa (at Al-Lewaa until 30 June 2022)
—	DF	KSA	Majid Shami (at Al-Rayyan until 30 June 2022)

== Transfers and loans ==
=== Transfers in ===
Entry date	Position	No.	Player	From club	Fee	Ref.
30 June 2021	MF	10	(Brazil) Jailson	(Saudi Arabia) Najran	End of loan	
1 July 2021	GK	71	(Bulgaria) Martin Lukov	(Bulgaria) Lokomotiv Plovdiv	$225,000	
1 July 2021	DF	3	(Saudi Arabia) Abdulaziz Majrashi	(Saudi Arabia) Al-Adalah	Free	
1 July 2021	DF	44	(Brazil) Marcelo	(Portugal) Paços Ferreira	Free	
1 July 2021	MF	11	(Zimbabwe) Knowledge Musona	(Belgium) Anderlecht	$350,000	
4 July 2021	DF	5	(Brazil) Lucão	(Switzerland) FC Luzern	Free	
11 July 2021	DF	15	(Saudi Arabia) Nawaf Al-Arifi	(Saudi Arabia) Al-Hilal	Free	
11 July 2021	DF	19	(Saudi Arabia) Hassan Al-Jubairi	(Saudi Arabia) Al-Faisaly	Undisclosed	
14 July 2021	MF	75	(Saudi Arabia) Mohammed Harzan	(Saudi Arabia) Damac	Free	
15 July 2021	MF	8	(Brazil) Dener	(Portugal) Portimonense	Free	
26 July 2021	DF	13	(Saudi Arabia) Ibrahim Al-Zubaidi	(Saudi Arabia) Al-Taawoun	Free	
4 August 2021	MF	10	(Algeria) Amir Sayoud	(Algeria) CR Belouizdad	$1,000,000	
13 August 2021	FW	9	(Switzerland) Cephas Malele	(Romania) Argeș Pitești	Free	
29 January 2022	DF	40	(Cameroon) Collins Fai	(Belgium) Standard Liège	$335,000	

=== Loans in ===
Start date	End date	Position	No.	Player	From club	Fee	Ref.
7 July 2021	21 January 2022	MF	14	(Saudi Arabia) Basil Al-Sayyali	(Saudi Arabia) Al-Nassr	$53,000	
11 July 2021	End of season	MF	70	(Saudi Arabia) Mohammed Al-Thani	(Saudi Arabia) Ohod	None	
23 July 2021	End of season	MF	42	(Saudi Arabia) Hamed Fallatah	(Saudi Arabia) Al-Faisaly	None	
6 August 2021	6 January 2022	DF	88	(Saudi Arabia) Osama Al-Khalaf	(Saudi Arabia) Al-Nassr	None	
1 August 2021	End of season	MF	16	(Saudi Arabia) Mohammed Attiyah	(Saudi Arabia) Al-Shabab	None	
31 August 2021	End of season	MF	18	(Saudi Arabia) Abdulkareem Al-Qahtani	(Saudi Arabia) Al-Wehda	None	
31 August 2021	End of season	FW	99	(Saudi Arabia) Mohammed Maran	(Saudi Arabia) Al-Nassr	None	
8 January 2022	End of season	MF	26	(Saudi Arabia) Jamal Bajandouh	(Saudi Arabia) Al-Shabab	None	
22 January 2022	End of season	FW	30	(Argentina) Tobías Figueroa	(Chile) Deportes Antofagasta	None	
29 January 2022	End of season	DF	55	(Malawi) Rayane Hamidou	(Saudi Arabia) Al-Ahli	None	
29 January 2022	End of season	MF	79	(Saudi Arabia) Mukhtar Ali	(Saudi Arabia) Al-Nassr	None	
30 January 2022	End of season	GK	1	(Saudi Arabia) Nawaf Al-Aqidi	(Saudi Arabia) Al-Nassr	None	
30 January 2022	End of season	DF	23	(Saudi Arabia) Abdullah Hassoun	(Saudi Arabia) Al-Ahli	None	

=== Transfers out ===
Exit date	Position	No.	Player	To club	Fee	Ref.
30 June 2021	DF	5	(Saudi Arabia) Mansour Al-Shammari	(Saudi Arabia) Al-Nassr	End of loan	
30 June 2021	DF	12	(Saudi Arabia) Mohammed Al-Shanqiti	(Saudi Arabia) Al-Nassr	End of loan	
30 June 2021	DF	19	(Saudi Arabia) Hassan Al-Jubairi	(Saudi Arabia) Al-Faisaly	End of loan	
30 June 2021	DF	40	(Saudi Arabia) Hassan Al-Shamrani	(Saudi Arabia) Damac	End of loan	
30 June 2021	MF	18	(Saudi Arabia) Abdulelah Al-Shammeri	(Saudi Arabia) Al-Shabab	End of loan	
30 June 2021	MF	21	(Saudi Arabia) Abdulelah Al-Barrih	(Saudi Arabia) Damac	End of loan	
30 June 2021	MF	26	(Ivory Coast) Ismail Kouakou	(Oman) Al-Mussanah	End of loan	
30 June 2021	FW	33	(Ivory Coast) Junior Magbi	(Morocco) Wydad AC	End of loan	
1 July 2021	GK	1	(Saudi Arabia) Mohammed Awaji		Released	
1 July 2021	MF	55	(Saudi Arabia) Moshari Al-Thamali		Released	
1 July 2021	MF	80	(Brazil) Daniel Amora		Released	
13 July 2021	MF	10	(Brazil) Jailson	(Brazil) Santa Cruz	Free	
28 July 2021	GK	30	(Saudi Arabia) Saad Al-Saleh	(Saudi Arabia) Al-Qadsiah	Free	
2 August 2021	DF	79	(Saudi Arabia) Rashed Al-Raheeb	(Saudi Arabia) Al-Bukiryah	Free	
6 August 2021	MF	25	(Tunisia) Zied Ounalli	(Saudi Arabia) Al-Bukiryah	Free	
11 September 2021	DF	13	(Saudi Arabia) Mohanna Waqes	(Saudi Arabia) Al-Qaisumah	Free	
13 September 2021	FW	99	(Saudi Arabia) Mukhtar Fallatah	(Saudi Arabia) Al-Jubail	Free	
27 October 2021	MF	14	(Saudi Arabia) Turki Khamis	(Saudi Arabia) Al-Qala	Free	
1 December 2021	MF	24	(Saudi Arabia) Ali Awaji	(Saudi Arabia) Al-Entesar	Free	
15 February 2022	DF	5	(Brazil) Lucão	(Greece) Lamia	Free	
28 February 2022	GK	71	(Bulgaria) Martin Lukov	(Greece) Arda	Free	

=== Loans out ===
Start date	End date	Position	No.	Player	To club	Fee	Ref.
10 August 2021	End of season	DF	2	(Saudi Arabia) Nasser Al-Hulayel	(Saudi Arabia) Al-Khaleej	None	
30 August 2021	End of season	MF	85	(Saudi Arabia) Omar Al-Aidaa	(Saudi Arabia) Al-Lewaa	None	
31 August 2021	End of season	MF	29	(Saudi Arabia) Faisal Al-Musallamani	(Saudi Arabia) Al-Lewaa	None	
2 September 2021	End of season	DF	–	(Saudi Arabia) Majid Shami	(Saudi Arabia) Al-Rayyan	None	
24 January 2022	End of season	MF	17	(Saudi Arabia) Khaled Eid	(Saudi Arabia) Hajer	None	

== Pre-season ==
29 July 2021 Friendly	Al-Tai (Saudi Arabia)	5–1	(Egypt) Abu Kibir	Ismailia, Egypt
18:10 EGY	Al-Thani; Musona, Al-Showaiqi; Al-Aqel	Report

1 August 2021 Friendly	Al-Tai (Saudi Arabia)	0–2	(Egypt) Ismaily	Ismailia, Egypt
19:00 EGY		Report	Ben Youssef; Shilongo	Stadium: Ismailia Stadium

5 August 2021 Friendly	Al-Tai (Saudi Arabia)	2–0	(Egypt) Damietta	Ismailia, Egypt
21:00 EGY	Al-Harabi; Al-Thani	Report

== Competitions ==
=== Overview ===
Competition	Record							
Competition	G	W	D	L	GF	GA	GD	Win %
Pro League	30	11	4	15	33	45	−12	36.67
King Cup	1	0	0	1	2	3	−1	0.00
Total	31	11	4	16	35	48	−13	35.48

Updated to match played 27 June 2022
Source: Competitions

=== Pro League ===
==== League table ====
Pos	Team	Pld	W	D	L	GF	GA	GD	Pts
4	Al-Shabab	30	15	10	5	52	36	+16	55
5	Damac	30	12	8	10	38	44	−6	44
6	Al-Tai	30	11	4	15	33	45	−12	37
7	Al-Raed	30	10	6	14	35	45	−10	36
8	Al-Fateh	30	9	8	13	45	41	+4	35 (Note: Head-to-head points: Al-Fateh 5, Abha 5, Al-Fayha 4. Head-to-head goal difference: Al-Fateh +1, Abha –1.)

Source: spl.com
Rules for classification: 1) Points; 2) Head-to-head points; 3) Head-to-head goal difference; 4) Total goal difference; 5) Total goals scored; 6) Fair-play points (Note: Head-to-head record is used only after all the matches between the teams in question have been played).

==== Results summary ====
Overall								Home						Away					
Pld	W	D	L	GF	GA	GD	Pts	W	D	L	GF	GA	GD	W	D	L	GF	GA	GD
30	11	4	15	33	45	−12	37	7	3	5	25	22	+3	4	1	10	8	23	−15

Last updated: 27 June 2022.
Source: spl.com.sa

==== Results by round ====
Round	1	2	3	4	5	6	7	8	9	10	11	12	13	14	15	16	17	18	19	20	21	22	23	24	25	26	27	28	29	30
Ground	A	A	H	H	A	H	A	H	H	A	A	H	A	H	A	H	H	A	A	H	A	H	A	A	H	H	A	H	A	H
Result	L	L	L	W	D	W	W	L	L	L	L	W	L	W	W	L	L	L	L	W	W	D	L	L	D	D	W	W	L	W
Position	15	16	16	16	16	14	11	12	15	15	16	16	16	10	8	9	11	11	13	10	10	10	10	11	12	12	9	8	9	6

Updated to match(es) played on 27 June 2022. Source: spl.com.sa
A = Away; H = Home; W = Win; D = Draw; L = Loss

==== Matches ====
All times are local, AST (UTC+3).

Win Draw Loss Postponed

14 August 2021 1	Al-Hilal	1–0	Al-Tai	Riyadh
20:55	Al-Bulaihi (yellow card) 40'; Al-Breik (yellow card) 66'; Al-Shehri 90+1'	Report	Majrashi (yellow card) 11'; Musona (yellow card) 64'	Stadium: King Fahd International Stadium; Attendance: 9,002; Referee: Saoud Al-Athbah (Qatar)

20 August 2021 2	Damac	1–0	Al-Tai	Abha
19:10	Vittor (yellow card) 25'; Caktaš 59'	Report	Marcelo (yellow card) 90+3'	Stadium: Prince Sultan bin Abdul Aziz Stadium; Attendance: 453; Referee: Khaled Salwi

27 August 2021 3	Al-Tai	1–3	Al-Fayha	Ha'il
19:15	Musona 45' (pen.); Marcelo (yellow card) 61'	Report	Lopes 37' (pen.); Bamsaud 40'; Stojković (yellow card) 43'; Nasser (yellow card) 59'; Al-Abdulmenem (yellow card) 84', (goal) 85'	Stadium: Prince Abdul Aziz bin Musa'ed Stadium; Attendance: 3,100; Referee: Mohammed Al-Beredi

16 September 2021 5	Al-Batin	0–0	Al-Tai	Hafar al-Batin
18:35	Sami (yellow card) 64'	Report	Marcelo (yellow card) 49'; Dener (yellow card) 56'; Sayoud (yellow card) 76'; Al-Jubairi (yellow card) 86'	Stadium: Al-Batin Club Stadium; Attendance: 2,014; Referee: Mohammed Al-Esmaiel

23 September 2021 6	Al-Tai	4–2	Al-Ettifaq	Ha'il
18:45	Al-Harabi 28'; Malele 34', 77'; Marcelo 66'	Report	Souza 21', 41'	Stadium: Prince Abdul Aziz bin Musa'ed Stadium; Attendance: 5,094; Referee: Sultan Al-Harbi

2 October 2021 7	Al-Taawoun	1–2	Al-Tai	Buraidah
18:30	Al-Nabit 59'; Manoel (yellow card) 63'; Al-Amri (yellow card) 90+5'	Report	Al-Aqel (yellow card) 29'; Musona 66', (yellow card) 90+6'; Sayoud 74'; Marcelo (yellow card) 79'; Al-Harabi (yellow card) 87'	Stadium: King Abdullah Sport City Stadium; Attendance: 2,402; Referee: Mohammed Al-Qarni

16 October 2021 8	Al-Tai	0–1	Abha	Ha'il
18:20	Al-Khalaf (yellow card) 37'; Majrashi (yellow card) 56'	Report	Al-Jumayah (yellow card) 9'; Sharahili 45+2', (yellow card) 84'; Al-Qaydhi (yellow card) 58'; Al Hamsal (yellow card) 90+2'	Stadium: Prince Abdul Aziz bin Musa'ed Stadium; Attendance: 4,717; Referee: Shukri Al-Hanfoush

21 October 2021 9	Al-Tai	1–2	Al-Ahli	Ha'il
20:00	Lucão 45+2'; Dener (yellow card) 50'; Al-Zubaidi (yellow card) 90+4'	Report	Al Somah 7', 52'; Dankler (yellow card) 56'; Al-Rubaie (yellow card) 85'	Stadium: Prince Abdul Aziz bin Musa'ed Stadium; Attendance: 7,762; Referee: Abdullah Al-Harbi

28 October 2021 10	Al-Shabab	3–0	Al-Tai	Riyadh
19:50	Carlos 3'; Ighalo 23'; Al-Qahtani 62'	Report	Fallatah (yellow card) 64'; Al-Khalaf (yellow card) 80'	Stadium: Prince Faisal bin Fahd Stadium; Attendance: 5,569; Referee: Ahmad Al-Rumaikhani

3 November 2021 11	Al-Raed	4–0	Al-Tai	Buraidah
18:00	René 26'; Eder 47', 58'; El Berkaoui 54'	Report	Al-Thani (yellow card) 84'	Stadium: King Abdullah Sport City Stadium; Attendance: 2,362; Referee: Khaled Salwi

20 November 2021 12	Al-Tai	1–0	Al-Fateh	Ha'il
15:20	Marcelo (yellow card) 37'; Al-Harabi (yellow card) 72'; Al-Qahtani (yellow card) 87'; Sayoud 90+4'; Al-Sulaiman (yellow card) 90+5'	Report	Al-Saeed (yellow card) 48'; Al-Yousef (yellow card) 79'; Wikheim (yellow card) 87'	Stadium: Prince Abdul Aziz bin Musa'ed Stadium; Attendance: Khaled Al-Teris; Referee: 4,790

27 November 2021 13	Al-Ittihad	1–0	Al-Tai	Jeddah
19:40	Romarinho 27'; Coronado (yellow card) 90+7'	Report	Al-Harabi (yellow card) 50'; Al-Qahtani (yellow card) 85'; Sayoud (yellow card) 90+1'	Stadium: King Abdullah Sports City; Attendance: 49,206; Referee: Ovidiu Hațegan (Romania)

10 December 2021 4	Al-Tai	2–1	Al-Nassr	Ha'il
15:25	Majrashi (yellow card) 24'; Malele 52'; Musona (yellow card) 69'; Al-Qahtani (yellow card) 84'; Dener 90+2'; Al-Johani (yellow card) 90+5'	Report	K. Al-Ghannam (yellow card) 38'; Aboubakar 45+3'	Stadium: Prince Abdul Aziz bin Musa'ed Stadium; Attendance: 7,697; Referee: Nawaf Shukralla (Bahrain)

26 December 2021 14	Al-Tai	3–1	Al-Faisaly	Ha'il
15:30	Al-Johani (yellow card) 33'; Musona 65', 90+6'; Al-Harabi 72', (yellow card) 80'; Majrashi (yellow card) 90'	Report	Tavares 9'; Ismael (yellow card) 54'; Al-Ahmed (yellow card) 90'; Barnawi (yellow card) 90+3'	Stadium: Prince Abdul Aziz bin Musa'ed Stadium; Attendance: 4,066; Referee: Faisal Al-Blwi

31 December 2021 15	Al-Hazem	0–1	Al-Tai	Ar Rass
15:30	Zidan (yellow card) 24'; Al-Juwaid (yellow card) 56'	Report	Al-Jubairi (yellow card) 70'; Dener (yellow card) 90'; Musona 90+5'	Stadium: Al-Hazem Club Stadium; Attendance: 1,984; Referee: Khaled Al-Teris

11 January 2022 16	Al-Tai	0–4	Al-Hilal	Ha'il
15:40	Al-Jubairi (yellow card) 31'	Report	Hyun-soo 2'; Marega 18', 71'; Al-Olayan 54'	Stadium: Prince Abdul Aziz bin Musa'ed Stadium; Attendance: 5,098; Referee: Abdullah Al-Shehri

15 January 2022 17	Al-Tai	1–2	Damac	Ha'il
15:40	Dener 8'; Al-Zubaidi (yellow card) 40'; Marcelo (yellow card) 69'	Report	Al-Enezi (yellow card) 38'; Hamzi 42', 80'; Munshi (yellow card) 63'	Stadium: Prince Abdul Aziz bin Musa'ed Stadium; Attendance: 3,519; Referee: Shukri Al-Hanfoush

22 January 2022 18	Al-Fayha	2–0	Al-Tai	Al Majma'ah
15:35	Al-Abdulmenem 9', (yellow card) 64'; Moutari (yellow card) 16', (goal) 49'; Mandash (yellow card) 36'	Report	Bajandouh (yellow card) 35'; Al-Johani (yellow card) 45'	Stadium: Al Majma'ah Sports City; Attendance: 3,299; Referee: Faisal Al-Blwi

6 February 2022 19	Al-Nassr	4–1	Al-Tai	Riyadh
18:20	Talisca 6', 26'; Lajami (yellow card) 16'; Martínez 19' (pen.); Rodríguez 79'	Report	Al-Zubaidi (yellow card) 48'; Fallatah (yellow card) 50'; Al-Jubairi 59'	Stadium: Mrsool Park; Attendance: 7,693; Referee: Artur Soares Dias (Portugal)

12 February 2022 20	Al-Tai	3–1	Al-Batin	Ha'il
16:00	Al-Jubairi (yellow card) 42'; Bajandouh 55'; Figueroa 72'; Malele 90+3'	Report	Al-Shamlan (yellow card) 48'; Antônio 69', (yellow card) 90+5'; Rayhi (yellow card) 90+2'	Stadium: Prince Abdul Aziz bin Musa'ed Stadium; Attendance: 3,036; Referee: Sultan Al-Harbi

19 February 2022 21	Al-Ettifaq	0–1	Al-Tai	Dammam
18:10	Al-Rubaie (yellow card) 86'	Report	Figueroa 10'; Sayoud (yellow card) 26'; Al-Aqel (yellow card) 83'	Stadium: Prince Mohamed bin Fahd Stadium; Attendance: 5,380; Referee: Majed Al-Shamrani

27 February 2022 22	Al-Tai	1–1	Al-Taawoun	Ha'il
16:10	Al-Jubairi 26'; Marcelo (yellow card) 33'; Malele (yellow card) 64'	Report	Balobaid (yellow card) 29'; Medrán (yellow card) 35'; Figueroa 67' (o.g.); Hazazi (red card) 74'	Stadium: Prince Abdul Aziz bin Musa'ed Stadium; Attendance: 4,868; Referee: Fábio Veríssimo (Portugal)

4 March 2022 23	Abha	1–0	Al-Tai	Abha
16:15	Matić 45+3'; Atouchi (yellow card) 56'	Report	Ali (yellow card) 28'; Al-Jubairi (yellow card) 30'; Al-Zubaidi (yellow card) 90+4'	Stadium: Prince Sultan bin Abdul Aziz Stadium; Attendance: 353; Referee: Khalid Al-Juhani

12 March 2022 24	Al-Ahli	3–1	Al-Tai	Jeddah
20:45	Kom 42'; Al Somah 48', 56' (pen.)	Report	Malele (yellow card) 12'; Sayoud 33'; Marcelo (yellow card) 55'	Stadium: Prince Abdullah Al-Faisal Stadium; Attendance: 17,582; Referee: Khaled Al-Teris

18 March 2022 25	Al-Tai	2–2	Al-Shabab	Ha'il
19:00	Ali (yellow card) 25'; Al-Sultan (yellow card) 32'; Dener 51'; Figueroa 78'	Report	Carlos 39', 69'; Paulinho (yellow card) 88'	Stadium: Prince Abdul Aziz bin Musa'ed Stadium; Attendance: 7,336; Referee: Mohammed Al-Harbi

7 May 2022 26	Al-Tai	2–2	Al-Raed	Ha'il
20:50	Ali (yellow card) 16'; Sayoud 34', (yellow card) 45'; Figueroa 45+3', (yellow card) 59'; Fai (yellow card) 90+2'	Report	Al-Zain 18'; R. Al-Ghamdi 75'	Stadium: Prince Abdul Aziz bin Musa'ed Stadium; Attendance: 5,993; Referee: Georgi Kabakov (Bulgaria)

22 May 2022 27	Al-Fateh	1–2	Al-Tai	Al-Hasa
19:00	Al-Daheem (yellow card) 28'; Batna (yellow card) 62'; Al-Khulaif 70'	Report	Al-Jubairi (yellow card) 16'; Ali 24'; Fai (yellow card) 30'; Bajandouh (yellow card) 64'; Dener 79'; Al-Sultan (yellow card) 90'; Al-Aqidi (yellow card) 90+2'	Stadium: Prince Abdullah bin Jalawi Stadium; Attendance: 11,408; Referee: Sultan Al-Harbi

29 May 2022 28	Al-Tai	1–0	Al-Ittihad	Ha'il
21:00	Sayoud 51'; Dener (yellow card) 60'; Al-Harabi (yellow card) 67'; Majrashi (yellow card) 70'; Malele (yellow card) 90'	Report		Stadium: Prince Abdul Aziz bin Musa'ed Stadium; Attendance: 7,696; Referee: Szymon Marciniak (Poland)

23 June 2022 29	Al-Faisaly	1–0	Al-Tai	Al Majma'ah
21:00	Tavares 24'; Boyle (yellow card) 45+3'; Rossi P. (yellow card) 62'; Al-Qumayzi (yellow card) 90+2'	Report	Bajandouh (yellow card) 15'; Fai (yellow card) 67'	Stadium: Al Majma'ah Sports City; Attendance: 6,394; Referee: Kevin Ortega (Peru)

27 June 2022 30	Al-Tai	3–0	Al-Hazem	Ha'il
21:00	Al-Zubaidi (yellow card) 27'; Figueroa 34'; Musona 76'; Ali 87'	Report	Abdullah S. (yellow card) 71'	Stadium: Prince Abdul Aziz bin Musa'ed Stadium; Attendance: 4,974; Referee: Abdullah Al-Harbi

=== King Cup ===
All times are local, AST (UTC+3).

21 December 2021 Round of 16	Al-Taawoun	3–2	Al-Tai	Buraidah
18:00	Tawamba 66', 90+2'; Kaku (yellow card) 69', (goal) 82'	Report	Dener 31'; Al-Johani 53'	Stadium: King Abdullah Sport City Stadium; Referee: Sultan Al-Okairy

== Statistics ==
=== Appearances ===
Last updated on 27 June 2022.

No.	Pos	Nat	Player	Total		Pro League		King Cup	
No.	Pos	Nat	Player	Apps	Goals	Apps	Goals	Apps	Goals
Goalkeepers
1	GK	(Saudi Arabia) KSA	Nawaf Al-Aqidi	7	0	7	0	0	0
22	GK	(Saudi Arabia) KSA	Bader Al-Enezi	6	0	5+1	0	0	0
77	GK	(Saudi Arabia) KSA	Turki Al-Shammari	0	0	0	0	0	0
Defenders
3	DF	(Saudi Arabia) KSA	Abdulaziz Majrashi	25	0	14+10	0	1	0
4	DF	(Saudi Arabia) KSA	Abdulkarim Al-Sultan	11	0	5+6	0	0	0
13	DF	(Saudi Arabia) KSA	Ibrahim Al-Zubaidi	20	0	17+3	0	0	0
15	DF	(Saudi Arabia) KSA	Nawaf Al-Arifi	0	0	0	0	0	0
19	DF	(Saudi Arabia) KSA	Hassan Al-Jubairi	27	2	25+1	2	1	0
23	DF	(Saudi Arabia) KSA	Abdullah Hassoun	6	0	3+3	0	0	0
40	DF	(Cameroon) CMR	Collins Fai	9	0	8+1	0	0	0
44	DF	(Brazil) BRA	Marcelo	27	1	26	1	1	0
55	DF	(Malawi) MWI	Rayane Hamidou	1	0	1	0	0	0
87	DF	(Saudi Arabia) KSA	Mohammed Marzouq	0	0	0	0	0	0
Midfielders
6	MF	(Saudi Arabia) KSA	Abdulaziz Al-Harabi	21	2	12+8	2	1	0
7	MF	(Saudi Arabia) KSA	Mohammed Al-Aqel	6	0	1+5	0	0	0
8	MF	(Brazil) BRA	Dener	28	5	26+1	4	1	1
10	MF	(Algeria) ALG	Amir Sayoud	21	5	20+1	5	0	0
11	MF	(Zimbabwe) ZIM	Knowledge Musona	25	6	24	6	1	0
12	MF	(Saudi Arabia) KSA	Salem Al-Toiawy	0	0	0	0	0	0
16	MF	(Saudi Arabia) KSA	Mohammed Attiyah	6	0	0+6	0	0	0
18	MF	(Saudi Arabia) KSA	Abdulkareem Al-Qahtani	11	0	2+8	0	1	0
26	MF	(Saudi Arabia) KSA	Jamal Bajandouh	13	1	10+3	1	0	0
27	MF	(Saudi Arabia) KSA	Abdulwahab Jaafer	4	0	1+3	0	0	0
42	MF	(Saudi Arabia) KSA	Hamed Fallatah	23	0	16+7	0	0	0
66	MF	(Saudi Arabia) KSA	Murad Al-Enezi	0	0	0	0	0	0
75	MF	(Saudi Arabia) KSA	Mohammed Harzan	11	0	9+2	0	0	0
79	MF	(Saudi Arabia) KSA	Mukhtar Ali	11	2	11	2	0	0
Forwards
9	FW	(Switzerland) SUI	Cephas Malele	27	4	17+9	4	1	0
20	FW	(Saudi Arabia) KSA	Adeeb Al-Haizan	2	0	0+2	0	0	0
30	FW	(Argentina) ARG	Tobías Figueroa	12	5	12	5	0	0
32	FW	(Saudi Arabia) KSA	Fahad Al-Johani	9	1	7+1	0	1	1
70	FW	(Saudi Arabia) KSA	Mohammed Al-Thani	9	0	4+5	0	0	0
99	FW	(Saudi Arabia) KSA	Mohammed Maran	15	0	2+12	0	0+1	0
Player who made an appearance this season but have left the club
5	DF	(Brazil) BRA	Lucão	19	1	18	1	1	0
14	MF	(Saudi Arabia) KSA	Basil Al-Sayyali	1	0	0+1	0	0	0
71	GK	(Bulgaria) BUL	Martin Lukov	19	0	18	0	1	0
88	DF	(Saudi Arabia) KSA	Osama Al-Khalaf	13	0	9+3	0	0+1	0

=== Goalscorers ===
Rank	No.	Pos	Nat	Name	Pro League	King Cup	Total
1	11	MF	(Zimbabwe)	Knowledge Musona	6	0	6
2	8	MF	(Brazil)	Dener	4	1	5
2	10	MF	(Algeria)	Amir Sayoud	5	0	5
2	30	FW	(Argentina)	Tobías Figueroa	5	0	5
5	9	FW	(Switzerland)	Cephas Malele	4	0	4
6	6	MF	(Saudi Arabia)	Abdulaziz Al-Harabi	2	0	2
6	19	DF	(Saudi Arabia)	Hassan Al-Jubairi	2	0	2
6	79	MF	(Saudi Arabia)	Mukhtar Ali	2	0	2
9	5	DF	(Brazil)	Lucão	1	0	1
9	26	MF	(Saudi Arabia)	Jamal Bajandouh	1	0	1
9	32	FW	(Saudi Arabia)	Fahad Al-Johani	0	1	1
9	44	DF	(Brazil)	Marcelo	1	0	1
Total					33	2	35

Last Updated: 27 June 2022

=== Assists ===
Rank	No.	Pos	Nat	Name	Pro League	King Cup	Total
1	11	MF	(Zimbabwe)	Knowledge Musona	8	0	8
2	9	FW	(Switzerland)	Cephas Malele	4	1	5
3	10	MF	(Algeria)	Amir Sayoud	3	0	3
4	13	DF	(Saudi Arabia)	Ibrahim Al-Zubaidi	2	0	2
4	75	MF	(Saudi Arabia)	Mohammed Harzan	2	0	2
6	8	MF	(Brazil)	Dener	1	0	1
6	18	MF	(Saudi Arabia)	Abdulkareem Al-Qahtani	1	0	1
6	19	DF	(Saudi Arabia)	Hassan Al-Jubairi	0	1	1
6	20	FW	(Saudi Arabia)	Adeeb Al-Haizan	1	0	1
6	30	FW	(Argentina)	Tobías Figueroa	1	0	1
6	40	DF	(Cameroon)	Collins Fai	1	0	1
6	79	MF	(Saudi Arabia)	Mukhtar Ali	1	0	1
6	88	DF	(Saudi Arabia)	Osama Al-Khalaf	1	0	1
6	99	FW	(Saudi Arabia)	Mohammed Maran	1	0	1
Total					27	2	29

Last Updated: 27 June 2022

=== Clean sheets ===
Rank	No.	Pos	Nat	Name	Pro League	King Cup	Total
1	1	GK	(Saudi Arabia)	Nawaf Al-Aqidi	3	0	3
1	71	GK	(Bulgaria)	Martin Lukov	3	0	3
Total					6	0	6

Last Updated: 27 June 2022
