= Rayan Hamed =

Saudi Arabian footballer

Personal information
- Full name: Rayan Mohammed Hamed
- Date of birth: 13 April 2002 (age 24)
- Place of birth: Jeddah, Saudi Arabia
- Height: 1.80 m (5 ft 11 in)
- Position: Defender

Team information
- Current team: Al-Ahli
- Number: 46

Youth career
- Al-Ahli

Senior career*
Years	Team	Apps	(Gls)
2021–	Al-Ahli	71	(3)
2022	→ Al-Tai (loan)	1	(0)

International career^{‡}
2022–	Saudi Arabia U23		
2024–	Saudi Arabia	5	(0)
Medal record
Men's football
Representing Saudi Arabia
Islamic Solidarity Games
Silver medal – second place	2021 Konya
- * Club domestic league appearances and goals as of 30 October 2026 ‡ National team caps and goals as of 31 March 2026

Rayan Mohammed Hamed (Arabic: رَيَّان مُحَمَّد حَامِد; born 13 April 2002) is a Saudi Arabian professional footballer who plays as a defender for Al-Ahli and the Saudi Arabia national team.

== Club career ==
Hamed started his career at Al-Ahli and was called up to the first team in July 2021. On 16 August 2021, Hamed signed his first professional contract with the club. He made his league debut for the club on 25 August 2021 when he started in the match against Damac. On 29 January 2022, Hamed joined Al-Tai on loan. On 9 February 2025, Hamed renewed his contract with Al-Ahli.

== International career ==
Hamed made his debut for the Saudi Arabia national team on 6 June 2024 in a World Cup qualifier against Pakistan at the Jinnah Sports Stadium. He played the full game as Saudi Arabia won 3–0.

== Career statistics ==
=== Club ===
As of match played 27 May 2024

Club	Season	League		King Cup		Asia		Other		Total	
Club	Season	Apps	Goals	Apps	Goals	Apps	Goals	Apps	Goals	Apps	Goals
Al-Ahli	2021–22	2	0	0	0	—		—		2	0
Al-Ahli	2022–23	16	0	—		—		—		16	0
Al-Ahli	2023–24	10	0	0	0	—		—		8	0
Al-Ahli	Total	28	0	0	0	0	0	0	0	28	0
Al-Tai (loan)	2021–22	1	0	0	0	—		—		1	0
Career totals		29	0	0	0	0	0	0	0	29	0

== Honours ==
=== Club ===
Al-Ahli

- Saudi First Division League: 2022–23
- Saudi Super Cup: 2025
- AFC Champions League Elite: 2024–25

=== International ===
Saudi Arabia U23

- WAFF U-23 Championship: 2022
