= Virgil Misidjan =

Surinamese footballer (born 1993)

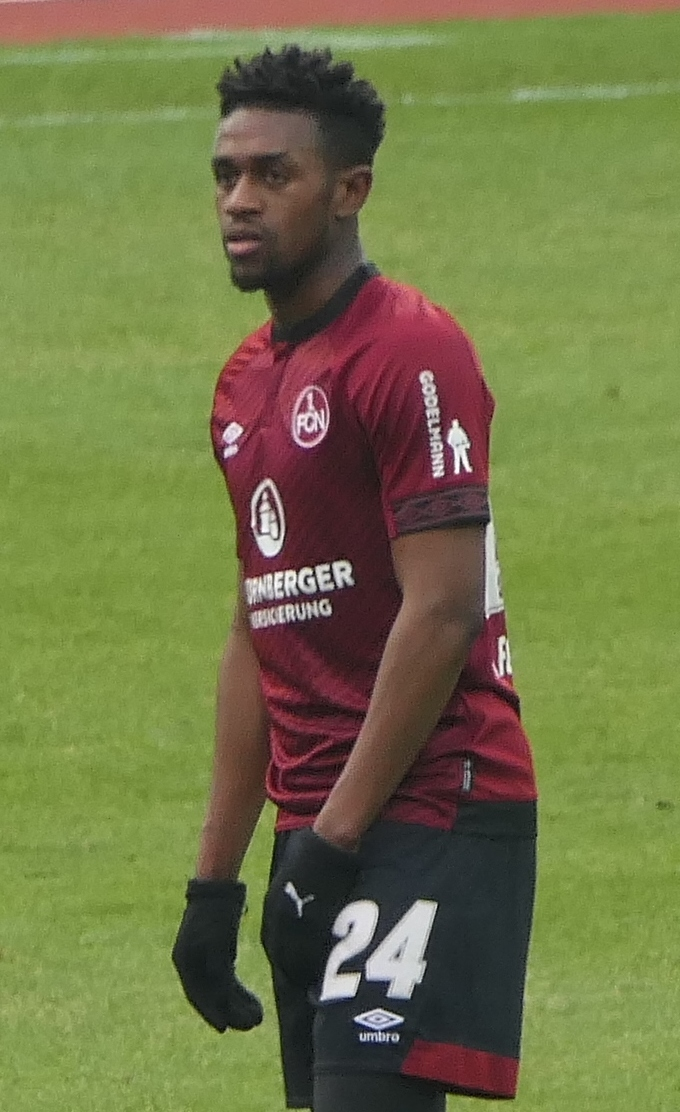
- Misidjan with 1. FC Nürnberg in 2019

Personal information
- Full name: Virgil Roy Misidjan
- Date of birth: 24 July 1993 (age 33)
- Place of birth: Goirle, Netherlands
- Height: 1.73 m (5 ft 8 in)
- Position: Left winger

Team information
- Current team: RKC Waalwijk
- Number: 93

Youth career
- –2011: Willem II

Senior career*
Years	Team	Apps	(Gls)
2011–2013	Willem II	54	(10)
2013–2018	Ludogorets Razgrad	132	(35)
2015–2018	Ludogorets Razgrad II	6	(1)
2018–2021	Nürnberg	26	(1)
2021	PEC Zwolle	15	(4)
2021–2023	Twente	58	(11)
2023–2024	Al-Tai	22	(4)
2024–2025	Ferencváros	3	(0)
2025–2026	NEC	17	(1)
2026–	RKC Waalwijk	2	(1)

International career^{‡}
2013	Netherlands U20	1	(0)
2024–	Suriname	13	(3)
- * Club domestic league appearances and goals as of 16:51, 25 September 2026 (UTC) ‡ National team caps and goals as of 19 November 2025

Virgil Roy Misidjan (born 24 July 1993), nicknamed Vura, is a professional footballer who plays as a left winger for Eerste Divisie club RKC Waalwijk. Born in the Netherlands, he plays for the Suriname national team.

== Club career ==
=== Early career ===
Born in Goirle to Afro-Surinamese parents, part of the suburban area of the city of Tilburg, Misidjan began his football career at Willem II.

=== Willem II ===
In early 2012, Misidjan returned to Willem II and helped the team gain promotion to the Eredivisie, finishing the season with 6 goals in 14 matches. He made his first team debut in a 1–0 away loss against Den Bosch on 29 January 2012, coming on as a substitute.

=== Ludogorets Razgrad ===
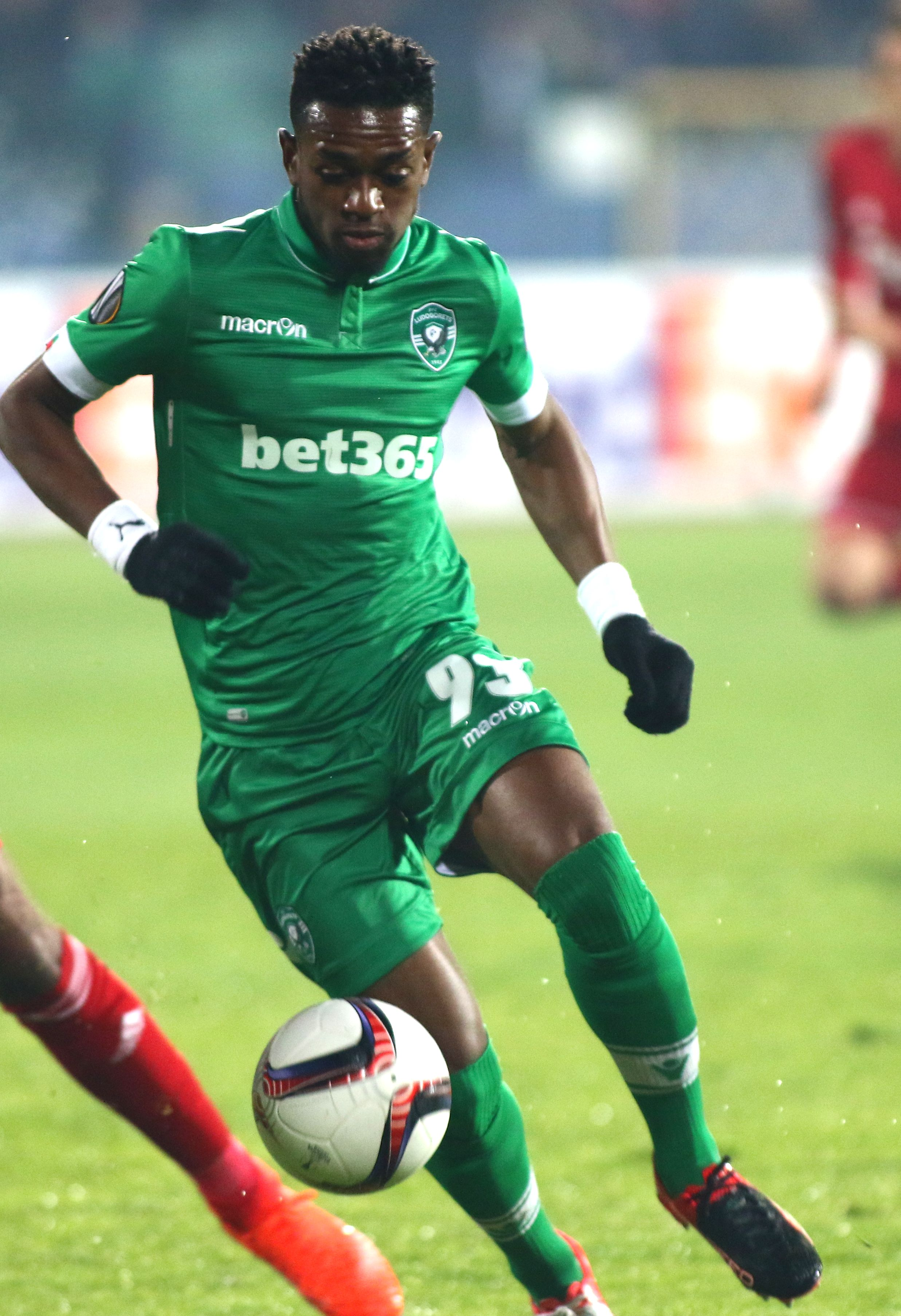

On 16 August 2013, Misidjan joined Bulgarian side Ludogorets Razgrad for a reported fee of €700,000. He was given the number 93 jersey. He made his debut on the following day, in a 1–0 away win over Lokomotiv Plovdiv, coming on as a second-half substitute. In the group phase of 2013–14 UEFA Europa League, Misidjan scored two goals in the matches against PSV Eindhoven. He also scored twice in the 2016–17 UEFA Champions League play-offs against Viktoria Plzeň, helping Ludogorets to qualify for the group phase. On 6 December 2016, he scored his maiden goal in the groups of the tournament, giving his side a 1–0 lead in a 2–2 draw in the away match against Paris Saint-Germain.

On 21 October 2017, he extended his contract with the team until 30 June 2020.

=== Nürnberg ===
On 31 August 2018, the last day of the 2018 summer transfer window, Misidjan joined 1. FC Nürnberg.

=== Zwolle ===
In January 2021, he returned to the Netherlands, signing a six-month contract with Zwolle.

=== Twente ===
In June 2021, he signed for Twente on a two-year deal.

=== Al-Tai ===
On 15 July 2023, Misidjan joined Saudi Pro League club Al-Tai on a free transfer.

=== Ferencváros ===
On 18 August 2024, Misidjan joined Hungarian Nemzeti Bajnokság club Ferencváros.

=== NEC ===
On 12 June 2025, Misidjan signed a one-year contract, with an option for an additional year, with Eredivisie club NEC. He made his competitive debut for the club on 9 August, the opening matchday of the season, coming on as a 71st-minute substitute for Başar Önal in a 5–0 victory over Excelsior. On 13 September, he scored his first goal for NEC—and his first as a starter—in a 5–3 defeat to PSV.

He made 17 league appearances for NEC in the 2025–26 season, and 20 in all competitions, scoring once and providing two assists; his contract expired at the end of the season and was not renewed.

=== RKC Waalwijk ===
Misidjan was without a club during the following summer, training with his former club Willem II to maintain his fitness and spending time on trial at FC Eindhoven, but was not offered a contract by either.

On 7 September 2026, after the transfer window had closed, Misidjan joined Eerste Divisie club RKC Waalwijk as a free agent, signing a contract until mid-2027 with an option for a further season. He made his debut four days later away to Jong Ajax, coming on as a substitute in the 62nd minute and scoring the opening goal with a deflected free kick in the 84th minute of a 2–0 win.

== International career ==
Misidjan received a call up for Netherlands U20 in 2013 and played in a friendly match against Serbia U21 on 22 March 2013, coming as a substitute at halftime in place of Guus Hupperts.

In 2014 Misidjan declined to play for Suriname. In December 2017 the ex Ludogorets manager Georgi Dermendzhiev hinted that Vura could potentially play for Bulgaria after August 2018.

In 2024 he got a new call-up to join the Surinamese National squad and this time he accepted.

== Personal life ==
Misidjan received a suspended 58-day prison sentence and was ordered to perform 240 hours of community service after he was convicted of assault for a January 2018 Roosendaal parking lot altercation with a 68-year-old man.

In an interview in 2017 Dynamo Kyiv midfielder Justin Lonwijk mentioned that he is the cousin of Misidjan.

== Career statistics ==
=== Club ===
As of 18 September 2026

Division	Apps	Goals	Apps	Goals	Apps	Goals	Apps	Goals	Apps	Goals	Apps	Goals
Willem II	2011–12	Eerste Divisie	18	6	0	0	—		—		18	6
Willem II	2012–13	Eredivisie	34	4	1	0	—		—		35	4
Willem II	2013–14	Eerste Divisie	2	0	—		—		—		2	0
Willem II	Total		54	10	1	0	—		—		55	10
Ludogorets Razgrad	2013–14	A PFG	28	9	5	1	11	2	—		44	12
Ludogorets Razgrad	2014–15	A PFG	28	10	6	1	11	0	1	1	46	12
Ludogorets Razgrad	2015–16	A PFG	17	2	0	0	2	0	1	0	20	2
Ludogorets Razgrad	2016–17	First League	27	1	6	4	11	3	0	0	44	8
Ludogorets Razgrad	2017–18	First League	26	12	2	0	10	1	1	0	39	13
Ludogorets Razgrad	2018–19	First League	6	1	—		6	1	1	0	13	2
Ludogorets Razgrad	Total		132	35	19	6	51	7	4	1	206	49
Nürnberg	2018–19	Bundesliga	23	1	2	0	—		—		25	1
Nürnberg	2019–20	2. Bundesliga	3	0	—		—		—		3	0
Nürnberg	Total		26	1	2	0	—		—		28	1
Zwolle	2020–21	Eredivisie	15	4	—		—		—		15	4
Twente	2021–22	Eredivisie	27	3	3	0	—		—		30	3
Twente	2022–23	Eredivisie	31	8	2	1	4	0	4	1	41	10
Twente	Total		58	11	5	1	4	0	4	1	71	13
Al-Tai	2023–24	Saudi Pro League	29	4	1	0	—		—		30	4
Ferencváros	2024–25	Nemzeti Bajnokság I	3	0	1	0	3	0	—		7	0
NEC	2025–26	Eredivisie	17	1	3	0	—		—		20	1
RKC Waalwijk	2026–27	Eerste Divisie	2	1	0	0	—		—		2	1
Career total			336	67	32	7	58	7	8	2	434	83

=== International ===
As of match played 18 November 2025

Appearances and goals by national team and year
National team	Year	Apps	Goals
Suriname	2024	9	2
Suriname	2025	4	1
Total		13	3

Scores and results list Suriname's goal tally first, score column indicates score after each Misidjan goal.

List of international goals scored by Virgil Misidjan
No.	Date	Venue	Cap	Opponent	Score	Result	Competition
1	5 September 2024	Synthetic Track and Field Facility, Leonora, Guyana	4	Guyana	3–1	3–1	2024–25 CONCACAF Nations League A
2	15 October 2024	Frank Essed Stadion, Paramaribo, Suriname	7	Guyana	3–1	5–1	2024-25 CONCACAF Nations League A
3.	10 October 2025	Frank Essed Stadion, Paramaribo, Suriname	10	Guatemala	1–1	1–1	2026 FIFA World Cup qualification

== Honours ==
RKC Waalwijk

- Eerste Divisie: 2010–11

Ludogorets

- Bulgarian A Group/First League: 2013–14; 2014–15, 2015–16, 2016–17, 2017–18
- Bulgarian Cup: 2013–14
- Bulgarian Supercup: 2014, 2018

Individual

- Eredivisie Team of the Month: October 2022
