= Robert Bauer (footballer) =

German footballer (born 1995)

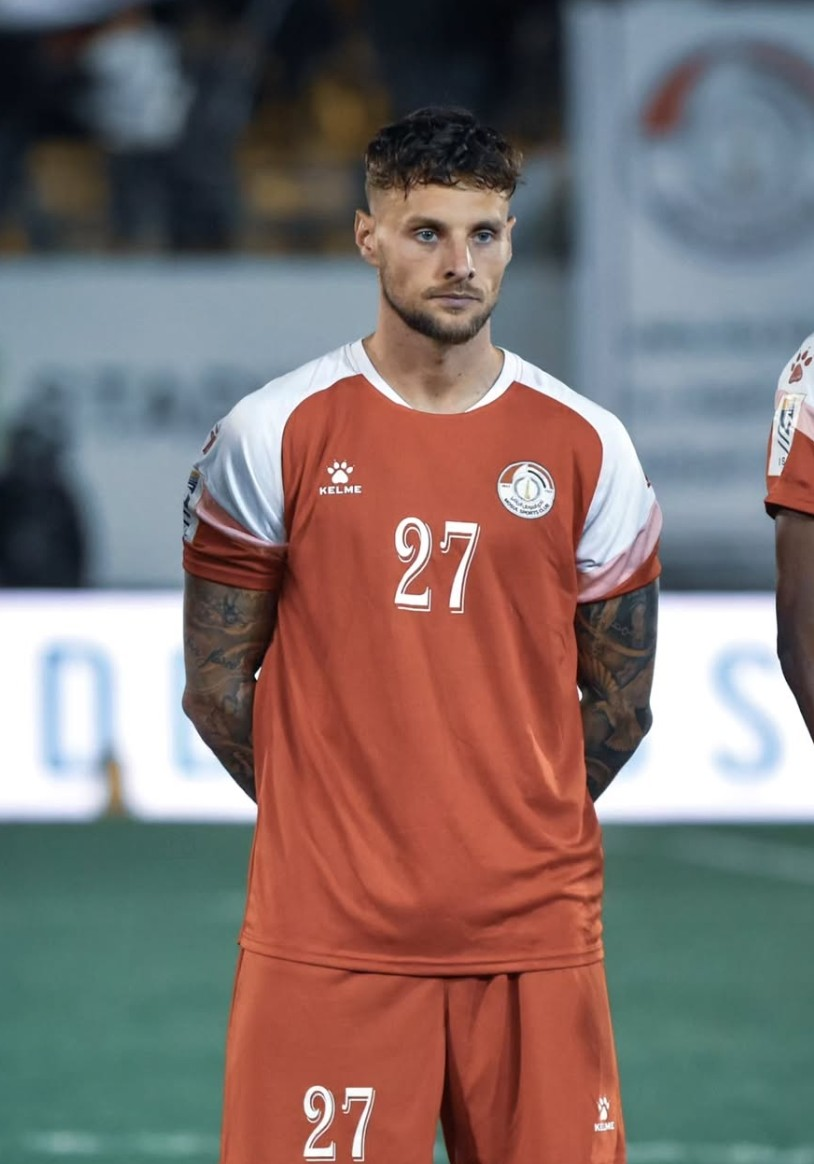
- Bauer playing for Mosul SC in 2026

Personal information
- Date of birth: 9 April 1995 (age 31)
- Place of birth: Pforzheim, Germany
- Height: 1.83 m (6 ft 0 in)
- Positions: Centre-back; full-back; defensive midfielder

Team information
- Current team: Mosul SC
- Number: 27

Youth career
- FSV Buckenberg
- –2014: Karlsruher SC

Senior career*
Years	Team	Apps	(Gls)
2014–2016	FC Ingolstadt	42	(1)
2014–2016	→ FC Ingolstadt II	6	(1)
2016–2019	Werder Bremen	43	(1)
2018–2019	→ 1. FC Nürnberg (loan)	22	(0)
2019–2021	Arsenal Tula	36	(2)
2021–2023	Sint-Truiden	46	(1)
2023–2024	Al-Tai	33	(1)
2024–2025	Neftchi Baku	15	(0)
2025	Buriram United	9	(0)
2026-	Mosul SC	6	(0)

International career^{‡}
2015–2016	Germany U20	6	(0)
2016	Germany Olympic	1	(0)
Medal record
Olympic Games
Silver medal – second place	2016 Rio de Janeiro	Team
- * Club domestic league appearances and goals as of 4 June 2025 ‡ National team caps and goals as of 10:22, 11 August 2016 (UTC)

Robert Bauer (German pronunciation: [ˈʁoːbɛʁt ˈbaʊɐ]; born 9 April 1995) is a German professional footballer who plays for Iraq Stars League club Al-Mosul SC. Bauer represented the Germany national under-20 football team at the 2015 FIFA U-20 World Cup in New Zealand and won a silver medal at the 2016 Summer Olympics with the Germany Olympic football team.

== Club career ==
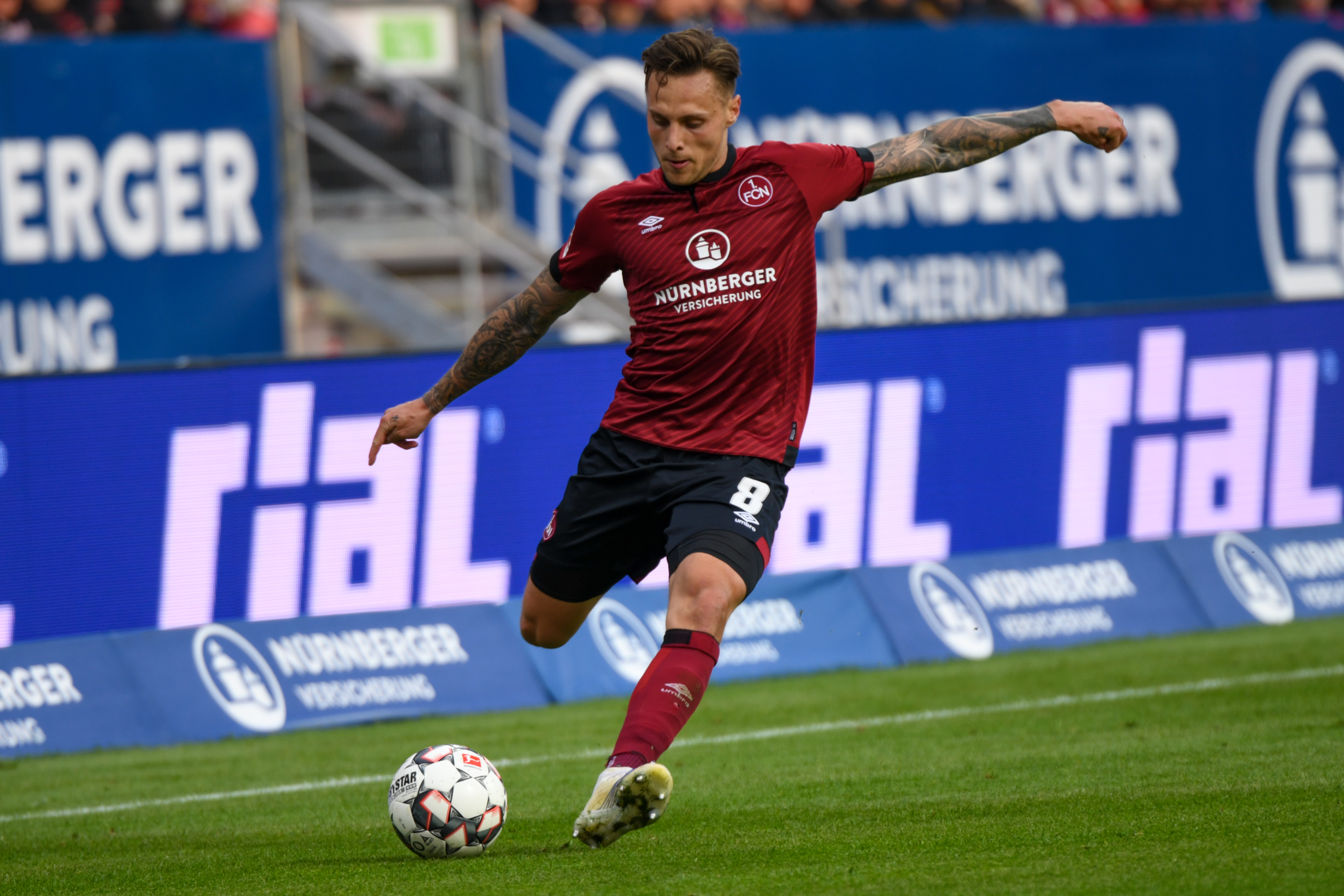
Bauer with Nürnberg in 2019

Bauer joined FC Ingolstadt in 2014 from Karlsruher SC. He made his 2. Bundesliga debut on 31 October 2014 against Fortuna Düsseldorf replacing Alfredo Morales at half-time in a 0–0 away draw. He scored his first Bundesliga goal from his first shot of the campaign against Darmstadt 98 on 22 November 2015.

In August 2016, Bauer signed for Werder Bremen for a reported fee of €3 million.

In July 2018, it was announced that Bauer was being loaned to 1. FC Nürnberg for the 2018–19 season.

In August 2019, he signed a long-term contract with Russian club FC Arsenal Tula.

In September 2021, he joined Sint-Truiden in Belgium.

In May 2023, Bauer joined Saudi Pro League club Al-Tai on a one-year contract.

In July 2024, Bauer joined Neftchi Baku. He spent one season at Neftchi Baku before leaving by mutual agreement.

In July 2025, Bauer moved to Thai League 1 champions Buriram United.

In February 2026, Bauer moved to Al-Mosul SC in the Iraq Stars League.

Throughout his career, Bauer has played in leagues across Europe and Asia, including the Bundesliga, Russian Premier League, Belgian Pro League, Saudi Pro League and Thai League 1.

== International career ==
Eligible to represent Germany or Kazakhstan, Bauer revealed that he had rejected an offer from the latter in February 2015 in hopes of representing Germany. The next month, he received his first call-up to the Germany U20 side and represented them at the FIFA U-20 World Cup in New Zealand that summer.

He was part of the squad for the 2016 Summer Olympics, where Germany won the silver medal.

== Personal life ==
Bauer announced in 2023 that he converted to Islam, saying that he came to Islam through his wife and her family.

== Career statistics ==
As of match played 24 May 2025

Appearances and goals by club, season and competition
Club	Season	League			National cup (Note: Includes DFB-Pokal, Russian Cup, Belgian Cup, King's Cup)		Continental		Total	
Club	Season	Division	Apps	Goals	Apps	Goals	Apps	Goals	Apps	Goals
FC Ingolstadt 04	2014–15	2. Bundesliga	18	0	1	0	—		19	0
FC Ingolstadt 04	2015–16	Bundesliga	24	1	0	0	—		24	1
FC Ingolstadt 04	Total		42	1	1	0	—		43	1
FC Ingolstadt 04 II	2014–15	Regionalliga	3	1	—		—		3	1
FC Ingolstadt 04 II	2015–16	Regionalliga	3	0	—		—		3	0
FC Ingolstadt 04 II	Total		6	1	—		—		6	1
Werder Bremen	2016–17	Bundesliga	27	1	0	0	—		27	1
Werder Bremen	2017–18	Bundesliga	16	0	3	0	—		19	0
Werder Bremen	Total		43	1	3	0	—		46	1
1. FC Nürnberg (loan)	2018–19	Bundesliga	22	0	2	0	—		24	0
Arsenal Tula	2019–20	Russian Premier League	14	1	2	0	—		16	1
Arsenal Tula	2020–21	Russian Premier League	22	1	3	1	—		25	2
Arsenal Tula	Total		36	2	5	1	0	0	41	3
Sint-Truiden	2021–22	Belgian Pro League	22	1	1	0	—		23	1
Sint-Truiden	2022–23	Belgian Pro League	24	0	2	0	—		26	0
Sint-Truiden	Total		46	1	3	0	—		49	1
Al-Tai	2023–24	Saudi Pro League	33	1	1	0	—		34	1
Neftchi Baku	2024–25	Azerbaijan Premier League	15	0	0	0	—		15	0
Buriram United	2025–26	Thai League 1	0	0	0	0	0	0	0	0
Career total			243	7	15	1	0	0	258	8

== Honours ==
Germany

- Summer Olympic Games: silver medal, 2016
