= 2026–27 CFR Cluj season =

CFR Cluj
2026–27 CFR Cluj season
- Manager: Antonio Folha
- Stadium: Dr. Constantin Rădulescu Stadium
- Superliga: Pre-season
- Cupa României: Pre-season
- UEFA Conference League: Pre-season
Home colours	Away colours	Third colours

The 2026–27 season is the 120th season in the history of CFR 1907 Cluj and their 19th consecutive season in Liga I. The club will also compete in the Cupa României and the UEFA Conference League.

== Transfers ==
=== In ===
Pos.	Player	Transferred from	Fee	Date	Source
DF	(Portugal) Marian Huja	(Poland) Pogoń Szczecin	Loan made permanent	1 July 2026	
MF	(Bosnia and Herzegovina) Igor Savić	(Bosnia and Herzegovina) Zrinjski Mostar		2 July 2026	

=== Out ===
Pos.	Player	Transferred from	Fee	Date	Source
FW	(Sweden) Alibek Aliev	(Romania) Universitatea Cluj	Free	1 July 2026	
DF	(Romania) Matei Ilie	(Turkey) Kasımpaşa	Undisclosed	1 July 2026	
FW	(Liberia) Mohammed Kamara	(Romania) Rapid București	Free	1 July 2026	
GK	(Romania) Mihai Popa	(Poland) Motor Lublin	Free	1 July 2026	

== Pre-season and friendlies ==
2 July 2026 Friendly	NK Aluminij (Slovenia)	v	(Romania) CFR Cluj
14:00

2 July 2026 Friendly	Neftçi PFK (Azerbaijan)	1–2	(Romania) CFR Cluj
18:00	83'	Report	58'; 79'

4 July 2026 Friendly	Olimpija Ljubljana (Slovenia)	1–1	(Romania) CFR Cluj
14:00	Kojić 27'	Report	Păun 25'

7 July 2026 Friendly	CFR Cluj (Romania)	1–1	(Armenia) Noah
17:00	76'		78'

9 July 2026 Friendly	CFR Cluj (Romania)	1–0	(Ukraine) Karpaty Lviv

14 July 2026 Friendly	CFR Cluj (Romania)	0–2	(Romania) Gloria Bistrița

== Competitions ==
=== Superliga ===
Pos	Team	Pld	W	D	L	GF	GA	GD	Pts	Qualification
11	Sepsi OSK Sfântu Gheorghe	5	1	3	1	2	2	0	6	Advances to Play-out
12	Voluntari	5	1	1	3	4	13	−9	4	Advances to Play-out
13	CFR Cluj	4	1	0	3	7	8	−1	3	Advances to Play-out
14	Botoșani	5	0	3	2	6	8	−2	3	Advances to Play-out
15	UTA Arad	5	0	2	3	3	9	−6	2	Advances to Play-out

Updated to match(es) played on 17 August 2026. Source: LPF (in Romanian)
Rules for classification: 1) Points; 2) Head-to-head points; 3) Head-to-head goal difference; 4) Head-to-head goals scored; 5) Goal difference; 6) Goals scored; 7) Play-off.

Pos	Team	Pld	W	D	L	GF	GA	GD	Pts	Qualification	1	2	3	4	5	6
1	1	0	0	0	0	0	0	0	0	Qualification to Champions League first qualifying round						
2	2	0	0	0	0	0	0	0	0	Qualification to Conference League second qualifying round						
3	3	0	0	0	0	0	0	0	0	Qualification to European competition play-offs						
4	4	0	0	0	0	0	0	0	0							
5	5	0	0	0	0	0	0	0	0							
6	6	0	0	0	0	0	0	0	0							

Source: LPF (in Romanian)
Rules for classification: 1) Points; 2) Points without rounding; 3) Points in the regular season; 4) Head-to-head points; 5) Head-to-head goal difference; 6) Head-to-head goals scored; 7) Goal difference; 8) Goals scored; 9) Play-off (only if needed to decide champion or teams for UEFA competitions). (Note: only criteria 7 and 8 are applied to establish the classification during the competition.

Pos	Team	Pld	W	D	L	GF	GA	GD	Pts	Qualification or relegation	7	8	9	10	11	12	13	14	15	16
7	7	0	0	0	0	0	0	0	0	Qualification to European competition play-offs										
8	8	0	0	0	0	0	0	0	0	Qualification to European competition play-offs										
9	9	0	0	0	0	0	0	0	0											
10	10	0	0	0	0	0	0	0	0											
11	11	0	0	0	0	0	0	0	0											
12	12	0	0	0	0	0	0	0	0											
13	13	0	0	0	0	0	0	0	0	Qualification to relegation play-offs										
14	14	0	0	0	0	0	0	0	0	Qualification to relegation play-offs										
15	15	0	0	0	0	0	0	0	0	Relegated to Liga II										
16	16	0	0	0	0	0	0	0	0	Relegated to Liga II										

Source: LPF (in Romanian)
Rules for classification: 1) Points; 2) Points without rounding; 3) Points in the regular season; 4) Head-to-head points; 5) Head-to-head goal difference; 6) Head-to-head goals scored; 7) Goal difference; 8) Goals scored; 9) Play-off (only if needed to decide champion or teams for UEFA competitions). (Note: only criteria 7 and 8 are applied to establish the classification during the competition.

==== Results summary ====
Overall								Home						Away					
Pld	W	D	L	GF	GA	GD	Pts	W	D	L	GF	GA	GD	W	D	L	GF	GA	GD
1	0	0	1	1	2	−1	0	0	0	0	0	0	0	0	0	1	1	2	−1

==== Results by round ====
Round	1	2	3	4	5	6	7	8	9	10	11	12	13	14	15	16	17	18	19	20	21	22	23	24	25	26	27	28	29	30
Ground	A	H	A	H	A	H	A	H	A	H	A	A	H	A	H	H	A	H	A	H	A	H	A	H	H	A	H	A	H	A
Result	L																													
Position	10																													

Updated to match(es) played on 18 July 2026. Source:
A = Away; H = Home; W = Win; D = Draw; L = Loss

=== Matches ===
18 July 2026 1	Oțelul Galați	2–1	CFR Cluj	Galați
18:30 UTC+3	João Santos 4'; Patrick Fernandes 86'	Report	Andrei Cordea 58'	Stadium: Oțelul; Attendance: 4,743; Referee: Florin Andrei

27 July 2026 2	CFR Cluj	v	FC Voluntari	Cluj-Napoca
18:30 UTC+3		Report		Stadium: Dr. Constantin Rădulescu

2 August 2026 3	Rapid București	v	CFR Cluj	Bucharest
21:30 UTC+3				Stadium: Rapid-Giulești

=== Cupa României ===
==== Group stage ====
2 September 2026 1	v

28 October 2026 2	v

2 December 2026 3	v

=== UEFA Conference League ===
==== Second qualifying round ====
The draw was held on 17 June 2026. CFR Cluj were drawn against the winners of the first qualifying round tie between FC Alashkert and Elimai Semei. Alashkert advanced 6–5 on penalties after the tie ended 3–3 on aggregate.

23 July 2026 First leg	Alashkert (Armenia)	1–1	(Romania) CFR Cluj	Yerevan, Armenia
18:00 UTC+4	Rafael Santana 35'	Report	Sfait 46'	Stadium: Yerevan Football Academy Stadium; Referee: Eldorjan Hamiti (Albania)

30 July 2026 Second leg	CFR Cluj (Romania)	v	(Armenia) Alashkert	Cluj-Napoca
21:30 UTC+3		Report		Stadium: Dr. Constantin Rădulescu; Referee: Vilhjálmur Þórarinsson (Iceland)
