= Andrei Cordea =

Romanian footballer (born 1999)

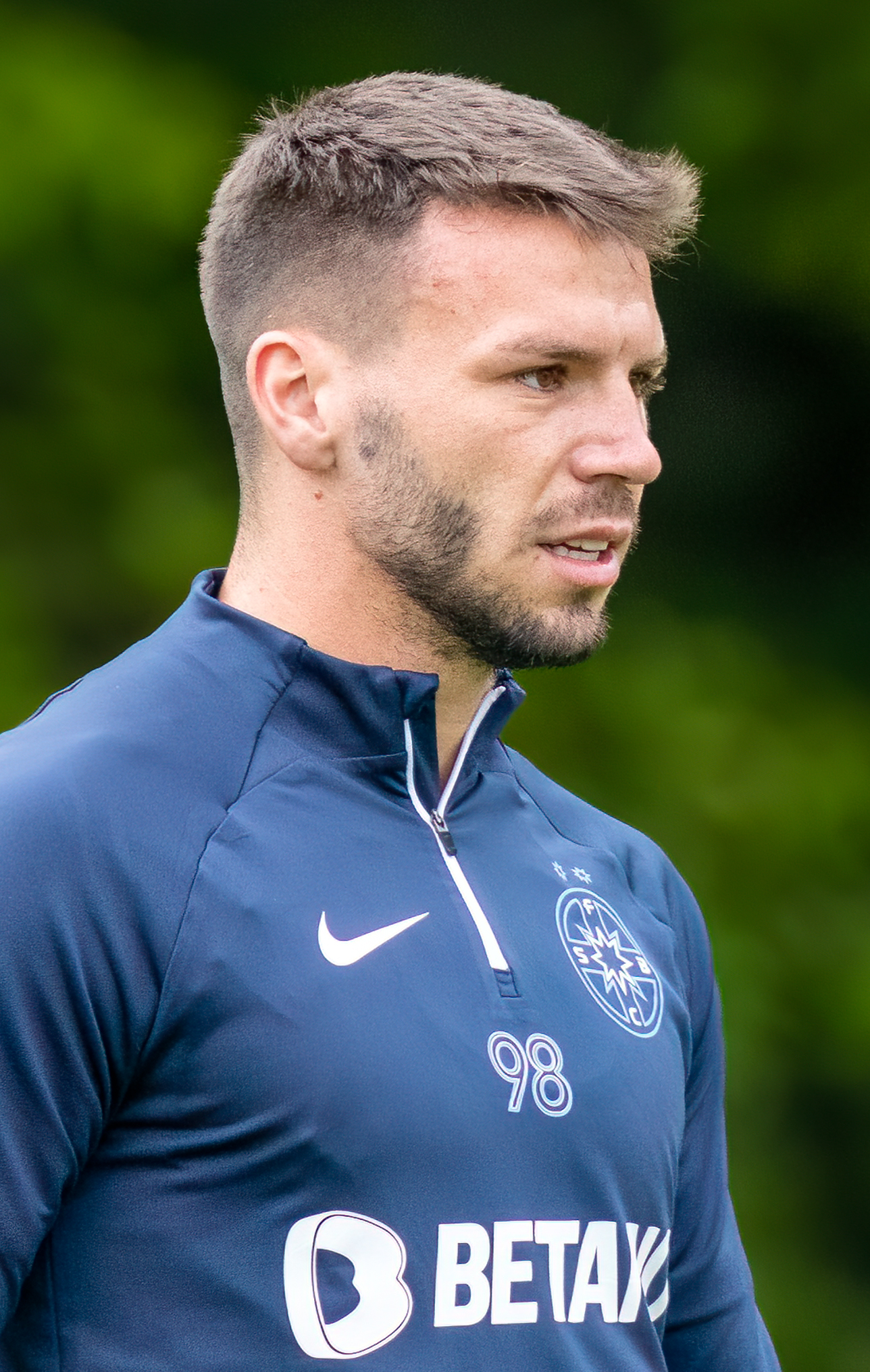
- Cordea with FCSB in 2023

Personal information
- Full name: Andrei Ioan Cordea
- Date of birth: 24 June 1999 (age 27)
- Place of birth: Aiud, Romania
- Height: 1.80 m (5 ft 11 in)
- Positions: Winger; attacking midfielder

Team information
- Current team: CFR Cluj
- Number: 11

Youth career
- 2009–2012: Metalul Aiud
- 2012–2017: Ardealul Cluj
- 2017–2018: Novara

Senior career*
Years	Team	Apps	(Gls)
2018–2020	Novara	1	(0)
2019–2020	→ Hermannstadt (loan)	18	(0)
2020–2021	Academica Clinceni	33	(3)
2021–2023	FCSB	79	(12)
2023–2025	Al-Tai	62	(17)
2025–	CFR Cluj	45	(19)

International career^{‡}
2016–2017	Romania U17	2	(0)
2017–2018	Romania U18	4	(1)
2018–2019	Romania U19	4	(0)
2021–	Romania	5	(0)
- * Club domestic league appearances and goals as of 25 October 2026 ‡ National team caps and goals as of 17 September 2023

Andrei Ioan Cordea (born 24 June 1999) is a Romanian professional footballer who plays as a winger or an attacking midfielder for Liga I club CFR Cluj.

== Club career ==
Cordea moved to FCSB from Academia Clinceni for an undisclosed transfer fee on 5 June 2021, signing a five-year deal with a €10 million buyout clause. On 15 July, he registered his debut in a goalless draw at Botoșani.

Cordea scored his first goal for the Roș-albaștrii seven days later, in a 1–0 UEFA Europa Conference League defeat of Shakter Karagandy. On the 25th, he netted his first Liga I goal against Universitatea Craiova.

On 12 September 2021, he scored in a 6–0 rout of Dinamo București, which registered the greatest goal difference ever in the Eternal derby.

On 22 August 2023, Cordea joined Saudi Pro League club Al-Tai on a two-year deal.

On 30 July 2025, Cordea returned to his native country by signing with CFR Cluj.

== International career ==
Following his good display at FCSB, Cordea received his first call-up to the Romania national team and made his debut on 5 September 2021, in a 2–0 defeat of Liechtenstein counting for the 2022 FIFA World Cup qualifiers.

== Career statistics ==
=== Club ===
As of match played 25 October 2026

Appearances and goals by club, season and competition
Club	Season	League			National cup (Note: Includes Coppa Italia Serie C, Cupa României, King's Cup)		Continental		Other		Total	
Club	Season	Division	Apps	Goals	Apps	Goals	Apps	Goals	Apps	Goals	Apps	Goals
Novara	2018–19	Serie C	1	0	1	0	—		—		2	0
Hermannstadt	2019–20	Liga I	18	0	1	0	—		—		19	0
Academica Clinceni	2020–21	Liga I	33	3	1	1	—		—		34	4
FCSB	2021–22	Liga I	38	5	1	0	2 (Note: Appearances in UEFA Europa Conference League)	1	—		41	6
FCSB	2022–23	Liga I	37	7	0	0	9	3	—		46	10
FCSB	2023–24	Liga I	4	0	0	0	4	0	—		8	0
FCSB	Total		79	12	1	0	15	4	—		95	16
Al-Tai	2023–24	Saudi Pro League	29	3	0	0	—		—		29	3
Al-Tai	2024–25	Saudi First Division League	33	14	2	0	—		1 (Note: Appearance in promotion play-offs)	0	36	14
Al-Tai	Total		62	17	2	0	—		1	0	65	17
CFR Cluj	2025–26	Liga I	32	13	2	1	4 (Note: Two appearances in UEFA Europa League, two appearances and one goal in UEFA Europa Conference League)	1	—		38	15
CFR Cluj	2026–27	Liga I	13	6	1	0	4	0	—		18	6
CFR Cluj	Total		45	19	3	1	8	1	—		56	21
Career total			238	51	9	2	23	5	1	0	271	58

=== International ===
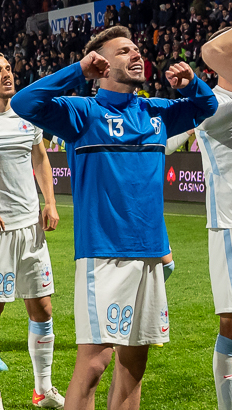
Cordea celebrating with FCSB after a win against CFR Cluj, April 2022.

As of match played 17 September 2023

Appearances and goals by national team and year
National team	Year	Apps	Goals
Romania
Romania	2021	2	0
Romania	2022	3	0
Total		5	0

== Honours ==
FCSB

- Liga I: 2023–24
