= Andres Sfait =

Romanian footballer

Personal information
- Full name: Andres Emil Sfait
- Date of birth: 9 December 2004 (age 21)
- Place of birth: Cluj-Napoca, Romania
- Height: 1.82 m (6 ft 0 in)
- Position: Winger

Team information
- Current team: CFR Cluj
- Number: 77

Youth career
- 2011–2014: Ardealul Cluj
- 2014: Grödig
- 2014–2016: Liefering
- 2016–2017: Red Bull Salzburg
- 2017: SV Kuchl
- 2017–2020: Grödig
- 2022–2024: Salernitana

Senior career*
Years	Team	Apps	(Gls)
2020–2021	Grödig II		
2021–2022	Grödig	32	(6)
2023–2025	Salernitana	4	(0)
2025–	CFR Cluj	39	(0)

International career^{‡}
2023–2025	Romania U20	8	(0)
- * Club domestic league appearances and goals as of 31 October 2026 ‡ National team caps and goals as of 21 March 2025

Andres Emil Sfait (born 9 December 2004) is a Romanian professional footballer who plays as a winger for Liga I club CFR Cluj.

== Career statistics ==
As of 31 October 2026

Appearances and goals by club, season and competition
Club	Season	League			National Cup (Note: Includes Austrian Cup, Coppa Italia, Cupa României)		Europe		Other		Total	
Club	Season	Division	Apps	Goals	Apps	Goals	Apps	Goals	Apps	Goals	Apps	Goals
Grödig	2021–22	Regionalliga Salzburg	26	6	1	0	—		—		27	6
Grödig	2022–23	Regionalliga Salzburg	6	0	0	0	—		—		6	0
Grödig	Total		32	6	1	0	—		—		33	6
Salernitana	2023–24	Serie A	2	0	2	0	—		—		4	0
Salernitana	2024–25	Serie B	2	0	1	0	—		—		3	0
Salernitana	Total		4	0	3	0	—		—		7	0
CFR Cluj	2024–25	Liga I	7	0	0	0	—		—		7	0
CFR Cluj	2025–26	Liga I	18	0	2	0	0	0	1 (Note: Appearance in Supercupa României)	0	21	0
CFR Cluj	2026–27	Liga I	14	0	2	1	4 (Note: Appearances in UEFA Conference League)	1	—		20	2
CFR Cluj	Total		39	0	4	1	4	1	1	0	48	2
Career total			75	6	8	1	4	1	1	0	88	8

== Honours ==
CFR Cluj

- Cupa României: 2024–25
- Supercupa României runner-up: 2025
