= Abdulrahman Al-Harthi =

Saudi Arabian footballer

Personal information
- Full name: Abdulrahman Mohammed Al-Harthi
- Date of birth: 6 September 1998 (age 28)
- Place of birth: Taif, Saudi Arabia
- Position: Winger

Team information
- Current team: Al-Tai
- Number: 10

Youth career
- Al-Ahli

Senior career*
Years	Team	Apps	(Gls)
2018–2019	Al-Ahli	0	(0)
2019–2020	Al-Khaleej	23	(1)
2020–2022	Al-Hazem	28	(4)
2022–2023	Al-Ain	27	(1)
2023–	Al-Tai		

International career
2014–2015	Saudi Arabia U17		
2016–2018	Saudi Arabia U20		
- * Club domestic league appearances and goals as of 31 May 2023

Abdulrahman Al-Harthi (Arabic: عبدالرحمن الحارثي, born 6 September 1998) is a Saudi Arabian professional footballer who plays as a winger for Al-Tai.

== Career ==
Al-Harthi started his career at Al-Ahli. He signed his first professional contract with the club on 17 September 2018. On 24 July 2019, Al-Harthi left Al-Ahli and joined Al-Khaleej. He spent one season at the club making 23 appearances and scoring once. On 1 October 2020, Al-Harthi joined Al-Hazem. In his first season at the club, Al-Harthi made 23 appearances and scored 4 goals as Al-Hazem were crowned champions of the MS League. On 12 September 2021, Al-Harthi made his Pro League debut starting against Al-Shabab. On 21 August 2022, Al-Harthi joined First Division side Al-Ain. On 15 July 2023, Al-Harthi joined Pro League side Al-Tai on a two-year deal.

== Honours ==
Al-Hazem

- MS League: 2020–21
