= Tobías Figueroa =

Argentine footballer

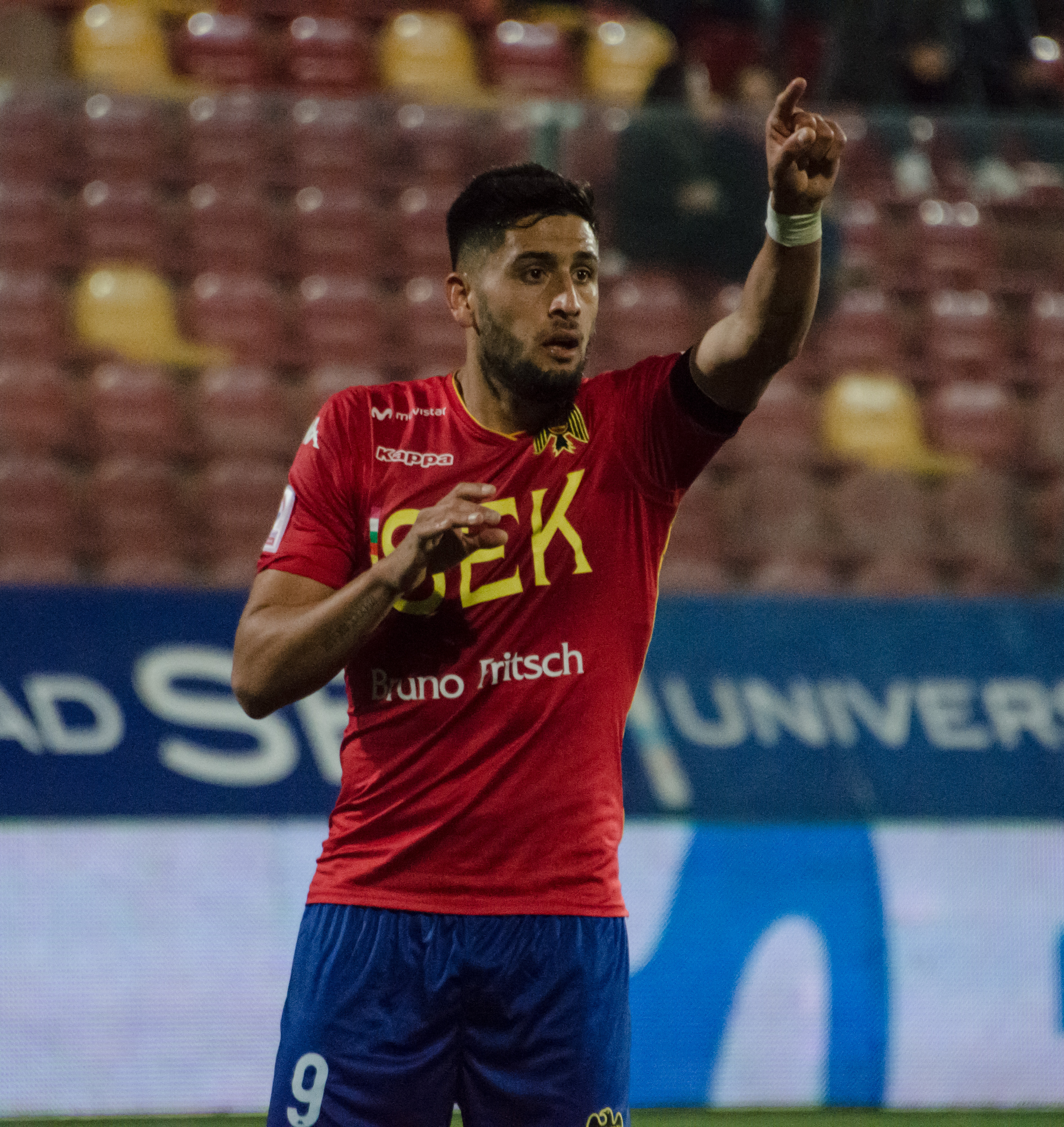
- Figueroa with Unión Española in 2018

Personal information
- Full name: Tobías Nahuel Figueroa
- Date of birth: 2 February 1992 (age 34)
- Place of birth: La Granja, Argentina
- Height: 1.91 m (6 ft 3 in)
- Position: Striker

Youth career
- Belgrano

Senior career*
Years	Team	Apps	(Gls)
2011–2019	Belgrano	16	(0)
2014	→ Almirante Brown (loan)	20	(3)
2014	→ Crucero del Norte (loan)	13	(1)
2015	→ Sarmiento de Junín (loan)	20	(3)
2016–2017	→ Guillermo Brown (loan)	59	(27)
2018	→ Unión Española (loan)	29	(14)
2019–2025	Deportes Antofagasta	105	(43)
2022	→ Al-Tai (loan)	12	(5)
2023	→ Curicó Unido (loan)	25	(1)
2024	→ Deportes Copiapó (loan)	24	(4)
- * Club domestic league appearances and goals as of 23 November 2025

Tobías Nahuel Figueroa (born 2 February 1992) is an Argentine professional footballer who plays as a striker.

== Career ==
Figueroa made his professional debut with Belgrano in the Argentine Primera División, he played the final few minutes in a 2–0 win against Atlético Tucumán on 2 May 2011. That was one of six appearances to come in his first four seasons. In January 2014, Figueroa joined Almirante Brown in Primera B Nacional. He made his debut against Banfield, before scoring his first career goal in his following match versus Villa San Carlos. In total, Figueroa scored three goals in twenty games in 2013–14 as they were relegated. Figueroa completed a loan move to fellow Primera B Nacional team Crucero del Norte in August 2014.

One goal in thirteen appearances followed as Crucero were promoted to the 2015 Argentine Primera División. 2015 saw him leave Belgrano on a temporary basis for a third occasion, this time by joining Primera División side Sarmiento. His first goal for Sarmiento came on 21 March, against former team Crucero del Norte. He returned to Belgrano in December after twenty matches and three goals for the Junín-based outfit. On 16 January 2016, Figueroa signed for Primera B Nacional club Guillermo Brown on a two-season loan. He went onto score twenty-seven goals in fifty-nine fixtures for the second tier side.

In January 2018, Figueroa left Argentine football to join Unión Española of the Chilean Primera División on loan. He scored on his debut by getting the winning goal in an away win at the Estadio Nacional Julio Martínez Prádanos versus Universidad de Chile on 4 February. He followed that with a hat-trick in a 4–4 draw with Curicó Unido on 26 February. His loan with Unión Española ended at the end of November, having scored fourteen times for them. Figueroa sealed a return to Chile with Deportes Antofagasta on 24 January 2019.

On 22 January 2022, Figueroa joined on loan to Saudi Arabian club Al-Tai. The next season, he was loaned to Curicó Unido. For the 2024 season, he was loaned again to Deportes Copiapó. Back to Deportes Antofagasta, he left them at the end of the 2025 season.

== Career statistics ==
As of 8 May 2019.

Club statistics
Club	Season	League			Cup		Continental		Other		Total	
Club	Season	Division	Apps	Goals	Apps	Goals	Apps	Goals	Apps	Goals	Apps	Goals
Belgrano	2010–11	Primera B Nacional	1	0	0	0	—		0	0	1	0
Belgrano	2011–12	Argentine Primera División	2	0	1	0	—		0	0	3	0
Belgrano	2012–13	Argentine Primera División	2	0	0	0	—		0	0	2	0
Belgrano	2013–14	Argentine Primera División	1	0	0	0	0	0	0	0	1	0
Belgrano	2014	Argentine Primera División	0	0	0	0	—		0	0	0	0
Belgrano	2015	Argentine Primera División	0	0	0	0	0	0	0	0	0	0
Belgrano	2016	Argentine Primera División	0	0	0	0	—		0	0	0	0
Belgrano	2016–17	Argentine Primera División	0	0	0	0	0	0	0	0	0	0
Belgrano	2017–18	Argentine Primera División	10	0	2	0	—		0	0	12	0
Belgrano	2018–19	Argentine Primera División	0	0	0	0	0	0	0	0	0	0
Belgrano	Total		16	0	3	0	0	0	0	0	19	0
Almirante Brown (loan)	2013–14	Primera B Nacional	20	3	0	0	—		0	0	20	3
Crucero del Norte (loan)	2014	Primera B Nacional	13	1	0	0	—		0	0	13	1
Sarmiento (loan)	2015	Argentine Primera División	20	3	1	0	—		0	0	21	3
Guillermo Brown (loan)	2016	Primera B Nacional	20	6	0	0	—		0	0	20	6
Guillermo Brown (loan)	2016–17	Primera B Nacional	39	21	0	0	—		0	0	39	21
Guillermo Brown (loan)	Total		59	27	0	0	—		0	0	59	27
Unión Española (loan)	2018	Chilean Primera División	29	14	3	0	2 (Note: Appearance(s) in the Copa Sudamericana)	0	0	0	34	14
Deportes Antofagasta	2019	Chilean Primera División	10	2	0	0	2	0	0	0	12	2
Career total			167	50	7	0	4	0	0	0	178	50
