= Hassan Al-Jubairi =

Saudi Arabian footballer

Personal information
- Full name: Hassan Eidha Ali Al-Jubairi
- Date of birth: March 6, 1991 (age 35)
- Place of birth: Saudi Arabia
- Positions: Centre-back; right-back

Team information
- Current team: Al-Safa
- Number: 19

Senior career*
Years	Team	Apps	(Gls)
2015–2020	Jeddah		
2020–2021	Al-Faisaly	0	(0)
2020–2021	→ Al-Tai (loan)	29	(2)
2021–2023	Al-Tai	41	(2)
2023–2024	Al-Batin	12	(0)
2024–	Al-Safa		
- * Club domestic league appearances and goals as of 14 August 2021

Hassan Al-Jubairi (Arabic: حسن الجبيري; born 6 March 1991) is a Saudi Arabian professional footballer who plays for Al-Safa as a centre-back or right-back.

== Club career ==
Al-Jubairi started his career playing at Awacs Jeddah in the Neighborhood Leagues. He joined Jeddah during the 2015–16 season. He spent five seasons at the club before leaving. On 27 July 2020, Al-Jubairi joined Pro League side Al-Faisaly on a three-year deal. On 25 October 2020, Al-Jubairi was loaned out to Al-Tai until the end of the 2020–21 season. He left Al-Faisaly without making a single appearance. On 1 May 2021, Al-Jubairi scored twice against Al-Diriyah to help Al-Tai come back from 2–0 down to win the match 3–2. His two goals proved to be vital as Al-Tai earned promotion to the Pro League after finishing one point ahead of rivals Al-Jabalain. On 11 July 2021, Al-Jubairi joined Al-Tai on a permanent deal. On 14 August 2021, he made his Pro League debut in a 1–0 loss against defending champions Al-Hilal. On 29 July 2023, Al-Jubairi joined Al-Batin.
