= Abdulkarim Al-Sultan =

Saudi Arabian footballer

Personal information
- Full name: Abdulkarim Saud Sultan Al Sulaiman
- Date of birth: June 24, 2000 (age 26)
- Place of birth: Saudi Arabia
- Height: 1.83 m (6 ft 0 in)
- Position: Centre-back

Team information
- Current team: Al-Tai
- Number: 4

Youth career
- Al-Tai

Senior career*
Years	Team	Apps	(Gls)
2020–	Al-Tai	45	(0)

International career
2022	Saudi Arabia U23		
- * Club domestic league appearances and goals as of 27 May 2024

Abdulkarim Al-Sultan (Arabic: عبدالكريم السلطان; born 24 June 2000) is a Saudi Arabian professional footballer who plays as a centre-back for Pro League side Al-Tai.

== Club career ==
Al-Sultan started his career at Al-Tai. He was promoted to the first team during the 2019–20 season after the season resumed following the COVID-19 pandemic. In the 2020–21 season, Al-Sultan was part of the squad that earned promotion to the Pro League for the first time since 2008. He made his Pro League debut on 27 November 2021 by starting the league match against Al-Ittihad.
