= Adeeb Al-Haizan =

Saudi Arabian footballer

Personal information
- Full name: Adeeb Mamdouh Samhan Al-Haizan
- Date of birth: May 3, 2001 (age 25)
- Place of birth: Saudi Arabia
- Height: 1.78 m (5 ft 10 in)
- Position: Forward

Team information
- Current team: Al-Ain
- Number: 7

Youth career
- –2019: Al-Qala
- 2020–2021: Al-Tai

Senior career*
Years	Team	Apps	(Gls)
2019–2020	Al-Qala		
2020–2024	Al-Tai	36	(1)
2022–2023	→ Al-Orobah (loan)	24	(3)
2024–2025	Wej		
2025	Al-Qala		
2025–	Al-Ain		
- * Club domestic league appearances and goals as of 27 May 2024

Adeeb Al-Haizan (Arabic: أديب الحيزان; born 3 May 2001) is a Saudi Arabian professional footballer who plays as a forward for Al-Ain.

== Club career ==
Al-Haizan started his career at Al-Qala before moving to Al-Tai in 2020. He made his first-team after the season resumed after COVID-19 pandemic during the 2019–20 season. He scored his first goal for the club on 16 December 2020 in the 2–0 win against Al-Shoulla. He made 9 appearances and scored once during the 2020–21 season as Al-Tai earned promotion to the Pro League for the first time since 2008. He made his Pro League debut on 31 December 2021 in the 0–1 win against Al-Hazem. On 1 September 2022, Al-Haizan joined Al-Orobah on loan. On 27 September 2024, Al-Haizan joined Wej. On 10 January 2025, Al-Haizan joined Al-Qala. On 2 October 2025, Al-Haizan joined Al-Ain.
