= Rakan Al-Shamlan =

Saudi Arabian association football player

Personal information
- Full name: Rakan Shamlan Al-Enezi
- Date of birth: 14 April 1998 (age 28)
- Place of birth: Saudi Arabia
- Height: 1.75 m (5 ft 9 in)
- Positions: Winger; midfielder

Team information
- Current team: Al-Tai
- Number: 70

Youth career
- 2013-2017: Al-Nassr

Senior career*
Years	Team	Apps	(Gls)
2017–2020	Al-Nassr	2	(0)
2019	→ Al-Shabab (loan)	0	(0)
2019–2020	→ Al-Wehda (loan)	8	(1)
2020–2023	Al-Batin	49	(4)
2023–	Al-Tai	10	(2)

International career^{‡}
- Saudi Arabia U-20
- Saudi Arabia U-23
- * Club domestic league appearances and goals as of 3 November 2023 ‡ National team caps and goals as of 10 January 2019

Rakan Al-Shamlan (Arabic: راكان الشملان; born 14 April 1998) is a Saudi Arabian professional footballer who plays as a winger or midfielder for Al-Tai.

== Career ==
On 8 October 2020, Al-Shamlan joined Al-Batin on a three-year deal.

On 15 July 2023, Al-Shamlan joined Al-Tai on a two-year deal.
