= Bader Al-Enezi =

Saudi Arabian footballer

Personal information
- Full name: Bader Nawaf Mohammed Al-Khumaali Al-Enezi
- Date of birth: July 31, 1999 (age 27)
- Place of birth: Saudi Arabia
- Height: 1.78 m (5 ft 10 in)
- Position: Goalkeeper

Team information
- Current team: Al-Bukiryah
- Number: 22

Youth career
- Al-Tai

Senior career*
| Years | Team | Apps | (Gls) |
| 2019–2024 | Al-Tai | 13 | (0) |
| 2024– | Al-Bukiryah | 0 | (0) |

International career
| 2017 | Saudi Arabia U20 | | |
| 2022 | Saudi Arabia U23 | | |
- * Club domestic league appearances and goals as of 31 May 2023

Bader Al-Enezi (Arabic: بدر العنزي; born 31 July 1999) is a Saudi Arabian professional footballer who plays as a goalkeeper for Al-Bukiryah.

== Club career ==
Al-Enezi started his career at Al-Tai. He signed his first professional contract with the club on 16 June 2019. He made his first-team debut on 20 September 2020 against Al-Taqadom in the final league match of the 2019–20 season. On 21 March 2021, Al-Enezi renewed his contract with Al-Tai for another two years. In the 2020–21 season, Al-Enezi started the final six league matches as Al-Tai earned promotion to the Pro League for the first time since 2008. He made his Pro League debut on 3 November coming off the bench in the league match against Al-Raed. On 12 August 2024, Al-Enezi joined Al-Bukiryah.
